= List of infantry divisions of the Soviet Union 1917–1957 =

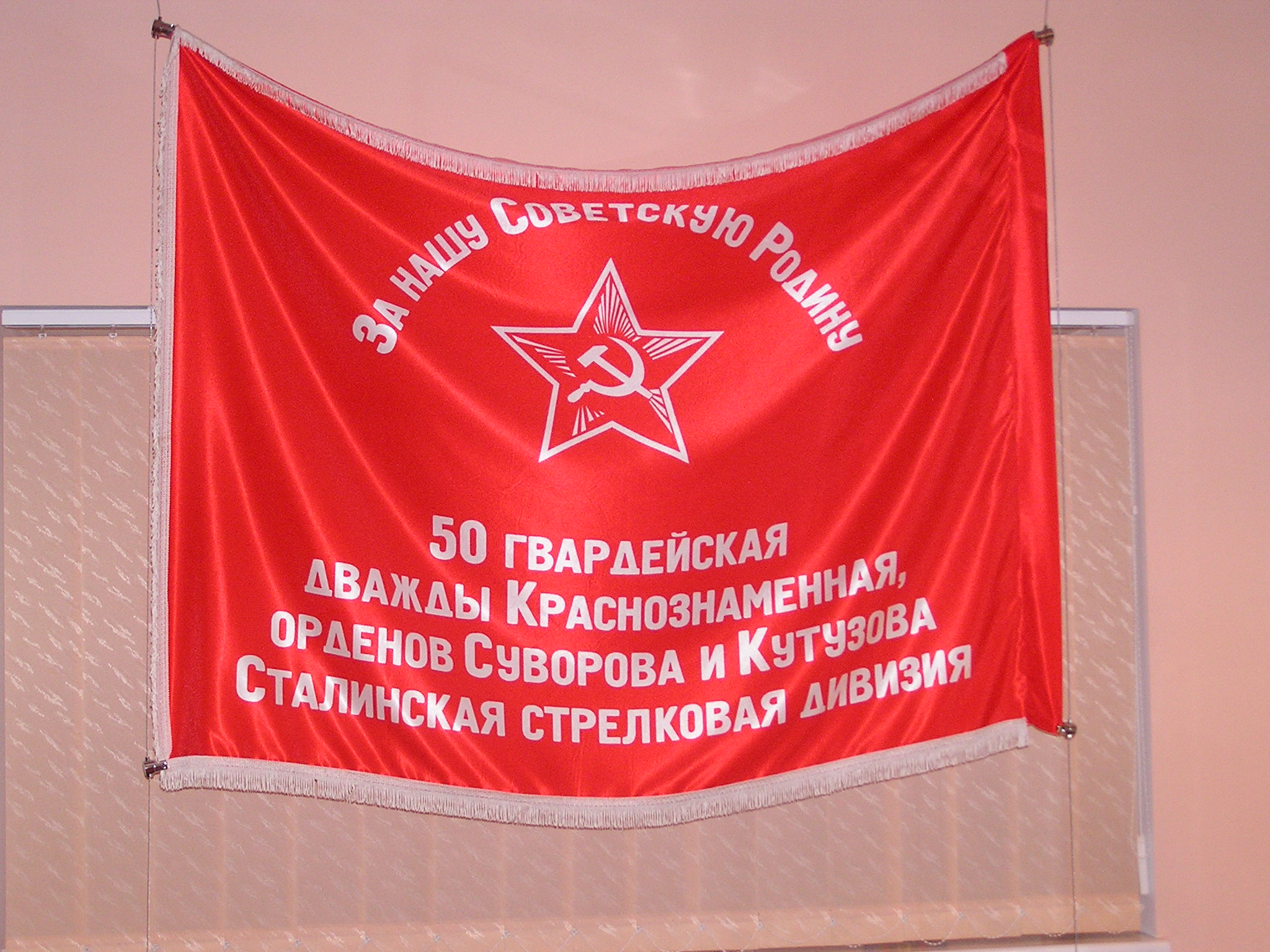
Divisional banner of the 50th Guards Rifle Division

This is a list of infantry divisions of the Soviet Union 1917–1957. It lists infantry divisions in the Soviet Union from the Russian Revolution to the reorganization of the Soviet Army in the aftermath of the Stalinist era. Mechanized Divisions were formed during 1945–46, and then all remaining Rifle Divisions were converted to Motor Rifle Divisions in 1957. During World War II more than 700 Rifle Divisions were raised.

== Divisions of the Russian Civil War ==
Many infantry (pekhotniye in Russian), literally 'movement', and rifle (strelkoviye in Russian), literally 'sharpshooter', divisions were inherited by the Workers-Peasants Army from the former Imperial Russian Army, but were renamed in the spirit of the Revolutionary times, often with names including words such as "Proletariat", "workers and peasants", or other titles that differentiated them from the past. They employed some of the 48,000 former Tsarist officers and 214,000 Tsarist NCOs along with over 10,000 administrative personnel. Initially the new 'Bolshevik' rifle divisions were composed of rifle brigades, and included:

- Division Headquarters (HQ)
- two or three infantry brigades of a brigade HQ and two infantry regiments
- artillery brigade of three regiments
- cavalry regiment
- a communications battalion
- a reconnaissance company
- independent tank battalion or company (from 1919 onward)
- a combat engineer battalion
- an air (balloon) detachment (otryad)
- an aviation group (aircraft)
- rear services companies/battalions, including:
  - Medical
  - Chemical defense
  - Ordnance
  - Transport

The division was to have an establishment of 26,972, with 14,220 combat troops, and depended on 10,048 horses to manoeuvre. Due to difficulties with recruiting volunteers into the armed forces early in the Russian Civil War, conscription was introduced on 29 May 1918, and all infantry divisions were renamed into rifle divisions on 11 October 1918.

The first six of the 11 formed divisions were those formed in the Petrograd, Moscow, Orel, Yaroslav, Privolzhsk and Ural okrugs. However, the divisions were initially only numbered, eventually 1st through to 47th by 1919. Five of these divisions were also named.

The Russian Civil War divisions were allocated to the various Fronts, including:

- Internal districts (reserve) – 1st to 11th divisions
- Northern Front – 18th and 19th divisions
- Eastern Front – 20th to 22nd, and 24th to 31st divisions
- Caspian-Caucasus Front – 32nd to 36th divisions
- Southern Front – 12th to 16th, 23rd, and 37th to 42nd divisions
- Western Front – 17th, 'Lithuanian', and 'Western' Rifle Divisions
- In Petrograd headquarters command – 1st and 2nd 'Latvian' divisions
- In reserve of the Kyiv headquarters command – 'Ukrainian' division

=== Other Civil War rifle divisions ===
- 1st Don Rifle Division — formed and disbanded in 1920 in the Penza-Saratov area of the Southern Front.
- 1st Communist Rifle division — formed in Tsaritsyn in 1918 and disbanded in 1919, its troops absorbed into the 4th Rifle Division as a brigade.
- 1st Red-Urals Rifle Division — formed in 1919 by the Eastern Front, and reformed as the Special Brigade of the 1st Revolutionary Army of Labour.
- 1st Novgorod Infantry Division — former Novgorod Infantry Division, was formed in April and disbanded in September 1918.
- 1st Orel Infantry Division — formed in the Orel area in April 1918 and disbanded by absorption into Novouzensk and Ural Infantry Divisions during Roslavl operations.
- 1st Ryazansk Infantry Division — formed in April 1918 from an armed detachment, and transferred to the Moscow okrug commissariat, but disbanded in September 1918 by transfer of its personnel into the 2nd Rifle Division.
- 1st Siberian Rifle Division — Formed on 22 October 1920 as the 28th Rifle Division VNUS for railway protection and defense in Siberia. Became 28th Rifle Division on 25 December 1920, then 1st Siberian Rifle Division on 19 February 1921. Disbanded on 13 June 1921 with units transferred to 26th Rifle Division and the 35th Rifle Division as replacements.
- 1st "Simbirsk" Rifle Division — formed in 1918, redesignated as the 24th Rifle Division in 1922.
- 1st Petrograd Infantry Division — Formed at Petrograd in May 1918. Elements of the division were sent to the Eastern Front
- 1st Rifle Division (1918–1920) — Formed at the lakes region around Petrograd. Fought around Olonets with the 6th and 7th Armies from November 1918 to 1920. Defended the Aleksandrovsk-Melitopol railroad line on the Southern Front in August 1920. Awarded the Order of the Red Banner in October 1920. Reorganized as a brigade of the 15th Inzensk Rifle Division in November 1920.
- 1st Vitebsk Rifle Division — Consolidated into the 17th Rifle Division on 23 October 1918.
- 2nd Rifle Division — Formed at Moscow, in September 1918. Fought at Ufa on the Eastern Front, April–July 1919. Fought against Yudenich with the 7th Army, October–December 1919. Fought in the Polish-Soviet War in the Western Front, May–August 1920, and against Stanisław Bułak-Bałachowicz's forces in October 1920.
- 2nd Smolensk Rifle Division — Consolidated into the 17th Rifle Division on 23 October 1918.
- 2nd Tula Rifle Division — Formed in August 1918 in Tula. Disbanded October 1918. Personnel and equipment transferred to the 8th Rifle Division.
- 5th Vitebsk Rifle Division (1918–1926) — Formed in 1918 as 2nd Penza Infantry Division in Penza. Renamed 5th Rifle Division in October 1918. It was awarded the honorific "Saratov" in 1920. The division received the honorific "Vitebsk" in 1921, which replaced the "Saratov" designation.
- 6th 'Orlovski' Rifle Division (1918–1927) — former Gatchina division, and 3rd Petrograd Infantry division; formed at Oryol area, which was to become part of the Moscow Military District.
- 16th Rifle Division — The division was formed in May 1918 in the Tambov region from Ukrainian detachments of the Red Guards.
- 17th Rifle Division — Formed on 23 October 1918 from the 1st Vitebsk Rifle Division and 2nd Smolensk Rifle Divisions by the Military council of Smolensk.
- 26th Rifle Division — Formed on 3 November 1918 on the Eastern Front, ended the Civil War on the Chinese border.
- 33rd Kuban Rifle Division — Formed on 20 March 1919 with the 12th Army as the 33rd Rifle Division. Became 33rd Kuban Rifle Division 2 December 1919, used to form the Kuban Cavalry Division on 4 September 1920.
- 33rd Rifle Division (10th Terek-Dagestan Army) — Formed on 8 December 1920 and then absorbed into the 14th Rifle Division on 9 May 1921.
- 44th Rifle Division — Formed on 22 September 1918 as the 1st Insurgent Division.
- 51st Rifle Division — Formed in July 1919 from the elements of the Special Northern Detachment, the Special Brigade, and the Vyzama Fortress Brigade.
- 57th Rifle Division — Formed in July 1919 from elements of the Group of Forces on the Poltava direction. Disbanded in November 1920 after the end of the Polish–Soviet War.
- Trans-Dnepr Rifle Division — Formed from partisan units of the Ukrainian Front in February 1919. Fought at Mariupol, Odesa, and Sevastopol, March–April 1919. Divided into the Crimean Red Army, 6th Ukrainian Rifle Division and 7th Insurgent Rifle Division, May 1919.
- 7th Insurgent Rifle Division — Formed from the 3rd Brigade of the Trans-Dnepr Rifle Division in May 1919. Fought in the Donbas in May 1919. Left the RKKA and became the core of the Revolutionary Insurrectionary Army of Ukraine (RIAU) in August 1919.

The structure of the divisions (N 220/34) had changed by the end of 1918 to increase the number of regiments in brigades to three, while eliminating the artillery brigade headquarters, leaving the nine artillery divizions (battalions) and one horse artillery battery to be allocated to rifle brigades. An armoured automobile detachment (otryad) was also added.

By 1921 the establishment of the rifle division had changed substantially in accordance with TO&E N 1400/246 for peace-time, with two brigades and only 15,876 personnel, and the reduction of artillery to two battalions and one battery, and the cavalry from four to three squadron regiment.

From 10 June 1922 the organization of rifle divisions war changed from brigade to regiment structure, with three regiments in each. The establishment of divisions stationed in the border areas was reduced to 8,705 personnel, and those in the interior regions to 6,725, including the reduction to a single cavalry squadron. The number of divisions was increased to 49.

== Divisions of the interwar years ==
Due to increasing economic difficulties in the post-war USSR, the armed forces were substantially reduced, and from 8 August 1923 transferred to the territorial system of organisation. All divisions were reduced to an establishment of 1,437 permanent cadre and 8,084 conscripted personnel. These new divisions were initially called militia-rifle divisions (Russian: милиционной-стрелковая дивизия), and later were renamed territorial-militia divisions (Russian: территориально-милиционная дивизия). However, despite reduction in number of service personnel, the number of territorial-militia divisions quadrupled by summer 1928.

The territorial principle of manning the Red Army was introduced in the mid-1920s. In each region able-bodied men were called up for a limited period of active duty in territorial unit, which comprised about half the Army's strength, each year, for five years. The first call-up period was for three months, with one month a year thereafter. A regular cadre provided a stable nucleus. By 1925 this system provided 46 of the 77 infantry divisions and one of the eleven cavalry divisions. The remainder consisted of regular officers and enlisted personnel serving two-year stints.

Most of the divisions that participated in the Russian Civil War were disbanded by 1927, however, Leon Trotsky initiated a formation of the new armed force with a professional cadre which was supported in its evolution even after his departure from Soviet Union. The reform in the rifle forces that begun in 1924 did create some notable changes, including commencement of adding names to the regular and newly formed territorial divisions, and creation of national divisions, notably one Belarusian, four Ukrainian, two Georgian, one Armenian, and one Azerbaijanian divisions. In 1928 1st and 3rd Turkestan, and in 1929 an Azerbaijanian divisions were reorganized as mountain-rifle divisions. Of the 70 rifle division, 41 were now territorial in their establishment.

During the 1930s the RKKA infantry forces were not only expanded, but also substantially reorganized, in part due to substantial input of military theorists into their doctrinal development, such as that of Mikhail Tukhachevsky whose 1934 report to the Defence Committee included 13 categories for divisional organization of the infantry. On 31 January 1935 the Committee decreed adoption of a single 13 thousand personnel peace-time establishment for a rifle division with the following organization:

- Division HQ
- three rifle regiments
- one artillery regiment
- one tank battalion (mixed)
- separate reconnaissance battalion (light tank company, cavalry squadron and SP artillery battery)
- communications battalion
- separate anti-aircraft machine-gun company
- sapper company
- aviation flight
- rear services/logistics and sustainment units

This structure more than double the number of combat personnel in the division from the 1929 establishment of 20.2% to 41.7%. In May 1937 the military commissars were added to the establishment of all RKKA military forces.

On 29 November 1937 four types of structures for rifle forces were established:

Far Eastern District divisions – 10,000 establishment
Cadre divisions – 7,000 (6950) establishment
Cadre mountain divisions – 4,000 establishment
Cadre territorial divisions – 6,000 (5,220) establishment. These divisions lacked the communications, reconnaissance and sapper battalions.

The territorial system was reorganized, with all remaining formations converted to 'cadre' divisions, in 1937 and 1938, with the cadre divisions retaining one territorial regiment until reorganisation that followed 1938 restructuring of all armed forces. Kamchatka and Sakhalin divisions were also added in the wake of the Soviet–Japanese Border Wars.

By 1938 there were plans to increase the number of rifle divisions in the RKKA (Red Army) from 98 to 173. These would include:

17 rifle divisions with 14 thousand personnel
1 rifle divisions with 12 thousand personnel (TO&E 04/400)
33 rifle divisions with 8,900 personnel (TO&E 04/100)
76 rifle divisions with 6 thousand personnel (TO&E 04/120)
33 rifle divisions with 3 thousand personnel
13 mountain-rifle divisions with 4 thousand personnel

The wartime strength of the new rifle division that was intended to include two artillery regiments was to have 18 thousand personnel, but none had been brought up to this strength by 1941.

== Divisions of the Second World War ==
Two events shaped the evolution of the RKKA rifle divisions during the initial period of the Second World War: the decision in 1938 to reorganise the Army, in part due to and following the repressions of the officer corps in 1937, and the 1939 campaign in Poland, and later war against Finland.

In the course of the Second World War the Soviet Union's Red Army raised over four hundred and fifty numbered rifle divisions (infantry). Usually the rifle divisions were controlled by the higher headquarters of the rifle corps. But scores of these formations were reformed several times; the total number of divisional formations formed may have been as high as 2,000, according to Craig Crofoot.

On 22 June 1941 the Red Army had 103 divisions in the western military districts, of which 70 were organised according to peace-time TO&E 04/100 with 10-thousand bayonet strength (actual number of rifles 7,818), but brought up to the 12-thousand strength (TO&E 04/400), with another six at the 11-thousand strength. Another 78 rifle divisions in the interior military districts were organised according to peace-time TO&E 04/120 6-thousand (5,864) bayonet strength (actual number of rifles 3,685). The wartime organisation of the RKKA rifle division was 14-thousand (14,483) with 10,420 rifles, but only 20 western border divisions had been brought up to this establishment when the war begun.

Zaloga notes that the Red Army formed at least 42 'national' divisions during the Second World War, including four Azeri, five Armenian, and eight Georgian rifle divisions and a large number of cavalry divisions in Central Asia, including five Uzbek cavalry divisions.

=== Note on Designations ===
During the war, many divisions were formed, destroyed or otherwise disbanded, and reformed several times: A notional example, using imaginary designations, runs:

"The 501st Rifle Division (1st formation), readiness category B organized to 1937 tables may have been disbanded at Vyazma in 1941, and a new 501st Division (2nd formation), readiness category A organized on 1942 tables formed in Rostov thousands of km away, then renamed 200th Guards Rifle Division in 1944, and a new 501st (3rd formation), readiness category A organized to 1944 tables division formed in Minsk".

== Rifle Divisions list ==
=== 1–10 ===
- 1st Moscow Proletarian Rifle Division — two formations, 1924 or 1926 (1st formation), and formed again in August 1939 (2nd formation). Became motorized again in January 1940. Division has a complicated history from that point, first becoming the 1st Guards Moscow Motor Rifle Division in September 1941 (see 'Motor Rifle Divisions' below), then the 1st Guards Rifle Division in January 1943 (see 'Guards Rifle Divisions' below), then becoming the 1st Guards Moscow MRD (again) in 1957.
- 1st Rifle Division — First and second formations were part of the organization that eventually became 1st Guards Rifle Division (see immediately above.) Third and fourth formations were formed mid-1942 and January 1944 respectively. Disbanded in the summer of 1945 with the Group of Soviet Forces in Germany.
- 2nd Rifle Division (1st formation) — With 50th Army of the 3rd Belorussian Front in May 1945. Disbanded 30 December 1945 in the Kiev Military District.
- 3rd Rifle Division — with 2nd Red Banner Army of the Far Eastern Front in May 1945. Disbanded 30 August 1946 in the Transbaikal Military District.
- 4th Rifle Division — with 69th Army of the 1st Belorussian Front in May 1945. Disbanded in the summer of 1945 with the Group of Soviet Forces in Germany. Reformed in 1955 from the 179th Rifle Division, then became the 4th Motor Rifle Division in 1957.
- 5th Vitebsk Rifle Division (1938–1940; 1st formation) – Western Military District, Baltic Special Military District. Took part in Soviet invasion of Eastern Poland 1939 with Third Army. Renamed the 44th Guards Rifle Division on 5 October 1942.
- 5th Oryol Rifle Division (2nd formation) — Reformed at Yefremov in October 1942. Fought at Oryol and in East Prussia. With 3rd Army of the 1st Belorussian Front May 1945. Disbanded June 1946 in the Minsk Military District.
- 6th Rifle Division — First formation in May 1918. Second formation in 1939, With the 28th Rifle Corps of the Fourth Army, on the Soviet Western Front, from June 1941. Fought at Ochkino, near Stalingrad, at Oryol and Yasy. With the 1st Guards Cavalry-Mechanized Group of the 2nd Ukrainian Front in May 1945. Disbanded in the fall of 1945 in the Transbaikal Military District.
- 7th Motor Rifle Division — First formed September 1918 at Vladimir in the Moscow Military District. Apparently formed up to four times in total (not in 1955–57, according to Feskov et al. 2013).
- 8th Rifle Division — formed in 1918, 1941, and 1941 again. With the 18th Army of the 4th Ukrainian Front in May 1945.
- 9th Mountain Rifle Division — formed May or September 1918, as the Kursk Infantry Division. Became 9th Motor Rifle Division around 1957.
- 10th Rifle Division — existed in 1920. Fought around Leningrad and the baltic states. Disbanded in the spring of 1946.

=== 11–20 ===
- 11th Rifle Division — Leningrad Military District, Baltic Special Military District. Established during the Civil War and fought in 1919. Used to form the 11th Mechanized Corps in 1932. Recreated at Kingisepp in 1936. Fought in northern Russia and the Baltic States. With the 42nd Army of the Kurland Group (Leningrad Front) in May 1945.
- 12th Amurskaya Rifle Division — Siberian Military District, Soviet Far East Front — with 2nd Red Banner Army, Far Eastern Front 5.45;
- 13th Rifle Division — North Caucasus Military District, Western Special Military District by 1941. Fought near Leningrad. Disbanded in the summer of 1945 with the Central Group of Forces.
- 14th Rifle Division — Formed at Moscow, Moscow Military District in 1922. September 1939 was in Leningrad Military District. Fought in the Winter War and later in the far north.
- 15th Mechanised Division- Kiev Special Military District, Odesa Military District. Established as 15th Rifle Division at Ulyanovsk in 1918. Became a motor rifle division in September 1939. Took part in Soviet occupation of Bessarabia and Northern Bukovina. Reorganized as rifle division in August 1941. Fought at Voronezh, Kursk, Ternopol, and in Belorussia, Pomerania, and near Stettin and Rostock. With the 65th Army of the 2nd Belorussian Front in May 1945.
- 16th Rifle Division — Leningrad Military District, Baltic Military District. Established at Novgorod October 1939. formed again near Malechna in December 1941, and briefly in 1955.
- 17th Rifle Division — Moscow Military District, Western Special Military District. Established at Gorki around 1920. Fought in the Winter War. Wiped out at Vyazma in October 1941. Recreated from 17th Moscow People's Militia Rifle Division around October 1941. Fought in Belorussia, East Prussia, and Kurland. With the 48th Army of the 3rd Belorussian Front in May 1945. Later became the 1st Rifle Brigade in 1946, then disbanded in 1947.
- 18th Rifle Division — established at Kazan in November 1939. Fought in Winter War with Finland, and at Battle of Moscow. Became 11th Guards Rifle Division January 1942. Recreated at Ryazan in Apr 1942. Fought at Kletskaya and Danzig. With the 19th Army of the 2nd Belorussian Front in May 1945. Disbanded in June 1946 with the Northern Group of Forces.
- 19th Rifle Division — formed 1922 as a territorial formation in the Moscow Military District, also in ОрВО. Fought at Battle of Moscow, Sichevka, Kharkov, in Ukraine, and at Bratislava. With the Seventh Guards Army of the 2nd Ukrainian Front in Czechoslovakia in May 1945.
- 20th Mountain Rifle Division — Transcaucasus Military District (former 3rd Caucasus) Formed as 20th Infantry Division 1919 (Ruwiki). Fought at Krasnodar, Novorossiysk, Krimskaya, and near Berlin. With the 28th Army (Soviet Union) of the 1st Ukrainian Front in May 1945.

=== 21–30 ===
- 21st Rifle Division — Siberian Military District, Soviet Far East Front. Established at Spassk before 1935. Fought in the Continuation War and in Hungary. With the 26th Army of the 3rd Ukrainian Front in May 1945.
- 22nd Rifle Division — North Caucasus Military District, Soviet Far East Front— (eventually became the 22nd Motor Rifle Division), formed reportedly in 1919.
- 23rd Rifle Division — established in the North Caucasus Military District before August 1932. On 17 May 1935 the division was part of the Kharkov Military District. On 1 July 1935 it was part of the 14th Rifle Corps. The division took part in the Invasion of Poland as part of the Ukrainian Front. On 2 October 1939 it was part of the 49th Rifle Corps, 12th Army. Became part of the 11th Army on 22 June 1941, wiped out in July 1941. Recreated at Dunaburg before December 1941, fought at Stalingrad and became the 71st Guards Rifle Division 1.3.43. Created again at Voroshilov in May 1943, fought at Kursk, Kiev, Zhitomir, and Riga. With the 61st Army of the 1st Belorussian Front in May 1945. Disbanded in the summer of 1945 with the Group of Soviet Forces in Germany.
- 24th Rifle Division — Formed in 1922, 1942 and 1945.
- 25th Rifle Division — fought in the Civil War. reestablished in 1925, 1942, and for a third time in 1943.
- 26th Rifle Division — established at Vorishilov in 1935. Fought near Tilsit in October 1944. With the 43rd Army of the 2nd Belorussian Front in May 1945.
- 27th Rifle Division — Created in 1920 and fought in the Russian Civil War. Created again at Vitebsk before June 1941. Fell in battle on the Svisloch river line on 25 June 1941. Disbanded on September 19, 1941. Recreated in August 1941 at Arkhangelsk. (Was renamed from Rebolsky Direction Division on September 24, 1941) Fought near Danzig in 1945. With 19th Army of the 2nd Belorussian Front May 1945. Disbanded in the summer of 1945 with the Northern Group of Forces.
- 28th Mountain Rifle Division— The history of the division dates from the 2nd Consolidated Rifle Division, which took part in the Civil War, and was then renamed the 28th Rifle Division. In the 1930s the 28th Rifle Division was renamed the 28th Highland Mountain Division, which became on 28 September 1936, the 28th Highland Mountain Division 'named for S. Ordzhonikidze' and then on 16 July 1940, the 28th Red Banner Mountain Division named for S. Ordzhonikidze. In the North Caucasus Military District in July 1941. Wiped out during Battle of Kiev, September 1941. Recreated at Archangelsk. Fought at Kiev, Velikiye Luki, and Targul Frumos. With 22nd Army of the RVGK 5.45.
- 29th Rifle Division — established at Omsk in 1920 as 4th Rifle Division, became 29th Rifle Division that year. As 29th Motorised Division, wiped out near Minsk in July 1941. Recreated July 1941, October 1941, and 1943 (after having become 72nd Guards Rifle Division. With 6th Guards Army of the Kurland Group (Leningrad Front) May 1945. 10th Rifle Brigade 1946, 63rd Mechanised Division 1953, 110th Motor Rifle Division 1957, then 29th Motor Rifle Division in 1964.
- 30th Rifle Division — established 1918. Became the 55th Guards Rifle Division in December 1942. Recreated at Rossosh in April 1943. Fought at Rostov, Kiev, Zhitomir, and in the Carpathians. With the 38th Army of the 4th Ukrainian Front in May 1945. Disbanded with the Northern Group of Forces in the summer of 1945. Reformed in 1955 from the 203rd Rifle Division, then became the 102nd Motor Rifle Division in 1957.

=== 31–40 ===
- 31st Rifle Division — Formed at Stalingrad in 1925. With 52nd Army of the 1st Ukrainian Front in May 1945. Disbanded July 1946.
- 32nd Rifle Division — raised in 1920 in the Saratov area. With the 4th Shock Army of the Kurland Group (Leningrad Front) in May 1945. Disbanded by summer of 1946, reformed 1955 from the 207th Rifle Division, then became the 32nd Motor Rifle Division in 1957.
- 33rd Rifle Division — The division was formed in June 1922 from a cadre of a rifle brigade in the Volga Military District as a territorial rifle division, and received the designation 'Samara'. With the 16th Rifle Corps of 11th Army on 22 June 1941. Fought vicinity Stalingrad and Berlin. With the 3rd Shock Army of the 1st Belorussian Front in May 1945. Disbanded in 1946, then reformed briefly in the Far East by redesignation of the 215th Rifle Division in 1955.
- 34th Rifle Division — established 1923. With Far East Military District during World War II, specifically with the 15th Army of the Far Eastern Front in May 1945. Fought in the invasion of Manchuria. Became the 11th Machine Gun Artillery Division in 1948, reformed in 1955 from the 216th Rifle Division, and then disbanded in 1956.
- 35th Rifle Division — established at Kazan in 1919. Served in the Far East Military District, and was a part of the 5th Rifle Corps in May 1945. Disbanded in the fall of 1945, reformed 1955 from the 255th Rifle Division, became 125th Motor Rifle Division 1957.
- 36th Rifle Division — established in 1919, became the 36th Motorized Division in 1937, then the 36th Motor Rifle Division in 1940. Became the 36th Rifle Division again in 1946, then disbanded in 1956.
- 37th Rifle Division — North Caucasus Military District. Established at Novocherkassk in 1922. Fought at Molodechno and Riga. With 22nd Army of the RVGK 5.45. Disbanded October 1945, reformed 1955 from 261st Rifle Division, became 127th Motor Rifle Division 1957.
- 38th Rifle Division — North Caucasus Military District. Established at Azov in 1920 as 2nd Don Rifle Division, became the 9th Don Rifle Division in 1922 and then the 38th Rifle Division in 1936, wiped out at Vyazma October 1941. Recreated at Alma Ata in January 1942 fought at Stalingrad and became the 73rd Guards Rifle Division in March 1943. Created again at Kutaisi in April 1943, fought on the Dnieper River and at Targul Frumos. With 2nd Ukrainian Front May 1945. Disbanded with the Southern Group of Forces in the summer of 1945.
- 39th Rifle Division — Soviet Far East Front. Established in 1922. Fought at Lake Khasan in August 1938. With the 1st Red Banner Army of the independent coastal group in the Far East May 1945. Fought in the invasion of Manchuria in August 1945. Became 129th Motor Rifle Division in 1957.
- 40th Rifle Division — Kiev Special Military District, Soviet Far East Front. 22 June 1941 with the 25th Army's 39th Rifle Corps along with the 32nd and 92nd Rifle Divisions. With the 25th Army of the independent coastal group in the Far East in May 1945. Fought in Manchurian campaign in 1945. Became the 40th Motor Rifle Division in 1957.

=== 41–50 ===
- 41st Rifle Division — Kharkov Military District, Kiev Special Military District; established at Kryvyi Rih in 1940. With 6th Rifle Corps, 6th Army of the Soviet Southwestern Front from 22 June 1941. Wiped out at Kiev September 1941. Recreated at Chapayevsk March 1942, wiped out at Izyum in May 1942. Recreated again in October 1942 at Verchovye from the 118th Rifle Brigade, fought at Kursk and in Poland. With the 69th Army of the 1st Belorussian Front in May 1945. Disbanded in the Group of Soviet Forces in Germany during the summer of 1945. Reformed in 1955 from the 264th Rifle Division, then became the 41st Motor Rifle Division 1957.
- 42nd Rifle Division — Leningrad Military District, Western Special Military District. Established at Terijok in February 1940. Fought in the Winter War. With the 28th Rifle Corps of 4th Army, Soviet Western Front in June 1941 and parts of the division defended the Brest Fortress until wiped out in July 1941. The remainder of the division fought at Smolensk and was surrounded and finally destroyed during the battle of Kiev in September 1942. Recreated at Volsk in January 1942. Fought at Lenino, Mogilev, Grodno, and Danzig. With 49th Army of the 2nd Belorussian Front, May 1945. Disbanded in the summer of 1945 with the Group of Soviet Forces in Germany.
- 43rd Rifle Division — formed 1924–25, fought at Siege of Leningrad With Leningrad Front, May 1945.
- 44th Mountain Rifle Division — Established in the Kiev Special Military District. Fought in the Civil War and destroyed during the Winter War. Reformed twice in 1940 and 1941. Reformed in 1955 and converted to motor rifle division in 1957.
- 45th Rifle Division — Began war in the Kiev Special Military District. With the 15th Rifle Corps of 5th Army on 22 June 1941. With 14th Army in northern Norway in May 1945.
- 46th Rifle Division — Initially established during the Civil War. Wiped out at Yelnaya in July 1941. Recreated at Ufa post-July 1941. Wiped out at Volkhov Pocket June 1942. Recreated from 1st NKVD Division at Vaskelevo. Fought at Lutsk and Danzig. With the 2nd Shock Army of the 2nd Belorussian Front in May 1945.
- 47th Mountain Rifle Division – Established at Kutaisi, Transcaucasian Military District before 1932. Georgian SSR national formation. Gained the Order of the Red Banner and the title on 'behalf of Comrade Stalin.' Fought at Poltava and wiped out at Izyum in May 1942. Recreated from the 21st Rifle Brigade in 1942, fought at Nevel and became regular rifle division in 1945. With the 22nd Army of the RVGK, in May 1945.
- 48th Rifle Division — Moscow Military District, Kalinin Military District, Baltic Military District. Established at Kalinin in 1939. Fought near Leningrad. With 22nd Army of the RVGK, May 1945.
- 49th Rifle Division — Leningrad Military District, Western Special Military District. Established at Kostroma in 1918. Fought in the Winter War. Mutinied 8 Jan 1940. Fought at Brest and destroyed at Minsk in 1941. Recreated Ivanovo November 1941. Fought at Stalingrad, Kursk, Roslavl, Mogilev, and near Berlin. With 33rd Army of the 1st Belorussian Front, May 1945. Disbanded in the summer of 1945 with the Group of Soviet Forces in Germany.
- 50th Rifle Division — Western Special Military District. Established at Polotsk before 1939, fought at Yelnya, Mozhaisk, Kursk, Targul Frumos, and in the Berlin Operation. With the 52nd Army of the 1st Ukrainian Front in May 1945.

=== 51–60 ===
- 51st Rifle Division — Fought with Blyukher during the Civil War. 1st formation at Odesa in the Odesa Military District before 1941. With 9th Army, Kiev Special Military District on the outbreak of war. Wiped out at Vyazma Oct 1941. 2nd formation from Eighth Moscow People's Militia Division subsequent to Oct 1941. Fought in Caucasus, Belorussia, and Kurland. With 50th Army of the 3rd Belorussian Front May 1945. Disbanded by May 1946.
- 52nd Rifle Division — Formed in 1935 in the Moscow Military District. Was in the invasion of Poland in 1939 and the Winter War with Finland. Renamed 10 Guards RD December 1941. Recreated Kolomna in January 1942, fought in Ukraine and Hungary. With 53rd Army of the 2nd Ukrainian Front 5.45.
- 53rd Rifle Division — formed at Saratov, Volga Military District, October 1939, fought at Yelnya, on the Dnieper River, at Uman and Targul Frumos. With 46th Army of the 2nd Ukrainian Front 5.45.
- 54th Mountain Rifle Division — formed in Leningrad Military District. With 7th Army (Soviet Union) on 22 June 1941. Fought near Leningrad. With 31st Army of the 1st Ukrainian Front 5.45. Disbanded in the summer of 1945 with the Central Group of Forces.
- 55th Rifle Division — Moscow Military District, Orel Military District, Western Special MD. Established at Kursk September 1938, fought at Velikiye Luki and wiped out at Kiev. Recreated at Kuybyshev December 1941. The division became the 1st Naval Infantry Division of the Baltic Fleet on 1 December 1944.
- 56th Rifle Division — established Pleskau before 1930. Fought vicinity Leningrad and Riga. With 42nd Army of the Kurland Group (Leningrad Front) May 1945.
- 57th Motor Rifle Division — Ural, Transbaikal MD- 'Ural-Khingan Red Banner' active by 1924 as a territorial division in the Ural MD. Fought at Khalkhin Gol 1938. With 17th Army of the Transbaikal Front 5.45. Fought with 6th Guards Tank Army in Manchuria August 1945. Rifle Division June 1946, became 55th Separate Rifle Regiment January 1947.
- 58th Mountain Rifle Division — Kiev Special Military District; established at Cherkassy 1932, fought in Uman Pocket, at Lenino, Korsun, and in Poland. With 3rd Guards Army of the 1st Ukrainian Front May 1945. See also Battle of Peregonovka (1919) and Kiev offensive (1920). Goff, 1998, has a note saying the 431st Rifle Division, formed 11 December 1941 in the Volga Military District, became the 58th Rifle Division ((First?) Formation), on 25 December 1941. Disbanded in the summer of 1945 with the Central Group of Forces.
- 59th Rifle Division — established in Primorye 1932 as 1st Kolkhoz Rifle Division, redesignated 59th Rifle Division 1936. With the 1st Red Banner Army in the Far East in May 1945. Fought in Manchurian campaign in August 1945. Disbanded on 30 August 1946.
- 60th Rifle Division — established at Ovruch before 1941. Disbanded Aug 1941. Recreated from 1st Moscow Militia Rifle Division in August 1941. Fought at Moscow, Kursk, and Warsaw. With 47th Army of the 1st Belorussian Front May 1945.

=== 61–70 ===
- 61st Rifle Division — established at Balschov before 1933. Fought in southern Russia, Ukraine, Belorussia, and in the Berlin Operation. With 28th Army of the 1st Ukrainian Front May 1945.
- 62nd Rifle Division — established Fastov in Sep 1939. With 15th Rifle Corps of 5th Army 22 June 1941. Disbanded Nov 1942. Recreated Apr 1943. Fought at Stalingrad and Kursk. With 31st Army of the 1st Ukrainian Front 5.45. Disbanded in the summer of 1945 with the Central Group of Forces.
- 63rd Mountain Rifle Division — established Tbilisi before 1941, originally as 2nd Georgian Infantry Division. The division was a Georgian national formation with honour titles including 'of the Order of the Red Star Frunze.' Became a rifle division in 1938, disbanded in June 1942 after being wiped out at Kerch. The 63rd Rifle Division was formed in June 1942 from the 8th Motor Rifle Division NKVD, became 52nd Guards Rifle Division November 1942. Recreated at Kaluga from the 45th and 86th Rifle Brigades in May 1943. Fought at Stalingrad, Kursk, and in the Belorussian Offensive. With 5th Army of the RVGK in May 1945.
- 64th Rifle Division — First formation established at Smolensk 1925. Became the 7th Guards Rifle Division in September 1941. Second formation recreated March 1942. Fought at Minsk and Stalingrad. With 3rd Shock Army of the 1st Belorussian Front May 1945. Disbanded in the summer of 1945 with the Group of Soviet Forces in Germany.
- 65th Rifle Division — established at Chita in February 1941. Fought near Leningrad and in the Petsamo-Kirkenes Offensive. Became the 102nd Guards Rifle Division in December 1944.
- 66th Rifle Division — formed on 14 May 1932. Fought in the Far East in 1945. Later became the 2nd Tank Division
- 67th Rifle Division — established in the Leningrad area in 1923. Fought in the Winter War. Re-formed in September 1941. With the 14th Army in Northern Norway in May 1945.
- 68th Mountain Rifle Division — Redesignated from the 3rd Turkestan Mountain Rifle Division in 1936. With the 4th Army of the Transcaucasus Front in May 1945. Disbanded in 1946.
- 69th Rifle Division — established at Blagoveshchensk in 1936 from the 3rd Kolkhoz Rifle Division. Reorganized as 69th Motorized Division in March 1941. Erroneously listed as fighting with 28th Army. It appears now that (citing Soviet documents) that 69th Motorized Division became 107th Tank Division on 17 July 1941. Recreated at Tashkent in December 1941. Fought at Kursk, Stettin, and in Operation Bagration. With 65th Army of the 2nd Belorussian Front May 1945.
- 70th Rifle Division — established in 1934 at Kuybishev; fought in the Winter War, at Leningrad and Novgorod. Renamed 45th Guards Rifle Division October 1942. Recreated at Kaluga from 47th and 146th Rifle Brigades in April 1943. Fought at Kursk and in Belorussia. Tatyana Baramzina gained the Hero of the Soviet Union while fighting with this division in July 1944; awarded posthumously. With 43rd Army of the 2nd Belorussian Front May 1945. Disbanded in the Northern Group of Forces in January 1947.

=== 71–80 ===
- 71st Rifle Division — established Kemerovo before June 1941. With 7th Army (Soviet Union) on 22 June 1941. Fought near Leningrad and Kursk, and in Vistula-Oder Operation. With 70th Army of the 2nd Belorussian Front May 1945. See ru:71-я стрелковая дивизия. Disbanded in the summer of 1945 with the Group of Soviet Forces in Germany.
- 72nd Rifle Division — established Leningrad before June 1941. Wiped out vicinity Tiraspol July 1941. Recreated near Leningrad Dec 1941 from 7th Naval Infantry Brigade. In Leningrad Military District postwar in 1945. With 21st Army of the 1st Ukrainian Front 5.45. Disbanded in the summer of 1945 with the Central Group of Forces.
- 73rd Rifle Division — established at Omsk in July 1940. Wiped out at Vyazma October 1941. Recreated February 1942 at Ordzhonikidze. Fought near Stalingrad, Kursk, and in the Belorussian and Berlin Operations. With 48th Army of the 3rd Belorussian Front May 1945.
- 74th Rifle Division — established at Krasnodar before June 1941. Fought vicinity of Kursk, Kiev, and Poznań. With the 26th Army of the 3rd Ukrainian Front in May 1945.
- 75th Mountain Rifle Division — established Lubny May 1939. On 15 May 1939 the 75th Rifle Division was transferred from the 14th Rifle Corps (Kharkov Military District) and arrived in the Leningrad Military District. Fought in Winter War. With the 4th Army, Western Front, from June 1941. Wiped out vicinity Kiev August 1941. Recreated in January 1942 from the 473rd Rifle Division (see below↓), which became the 75 Rifle Division (II Formation). With the 4th Army of the Transcaucasus Front in May 1945.
- 76th Rifle Division — formed at least twice, first time as an Armenian national formation which was converted into 51st Guards Rifle Division. With the 47th Army of the 1st Belorussian Front in May 1945. Disbanded in the summer of 1945 with the Group of Soviet Forces in Germany.
- 77th 'Simferopolskaya Red Banner, Order of Suvorov Division Sergo Ordzhonikidze' Mountain Rifle Division — established at Baku in 1930, originally as the Azerbaijan Infantry Division. Converted to a rifle division in June 1942. Azerbaijani national formation. Fought in the Caucasus and Crimea and vicinity Riga and Memel. With the 51st Army of the Kurland Group (Leningrad Front) May 1945. Later became the 126th Motor Rifle Division in 1957, and the 34th Motor Rifle Division in 1965.
- 78th Rifle Division — established at Khabarovsk in 1940. Became the 9th Guards Rifle Division in November 1941. Recreated at Samarkand March 1942. Fought near Targul Frumos, Iasi-Kishinev, and Debrecen. With 27th Army of the 3rd Ukrainian Front 5.45.
- 79th Mountain Rifle Division — formed in 1939 from the Sakhalin Rifle Division, became a regular division in 1940, with the 16th Army of the Far Eastern Front in May 1945. Occupied Sakhalin in August 1945. Became a Motor Rifle Division 1957.
- 80th Rifle Division — Formed in 1923 in Eastern Ukraine and destroyed at Uman in September 1941. Second formation in September 1941 from the 1st Guards Leningrad People's Militia Division. Fought at Leningrad, Operation Iskra, Leningrad — Novgorod Offensive, Baltic, Vistula-Oder, Lower Silesian, Upper Silesian and the Prague Offensive. Disbanded in the summer of 1945 with the Central Group of Forces.

=== 81–90 ===
- 81st Rifle Division — established at Lubny around 1936. As mechanised division, part of 4th Mechanised Corps, Southwestern Front, in June 1941. Fought at Voronezh and Kursk. With Soviet 1st Guards Army of the 4th Ukrainian Front in May 1945. Disbanded in the summer of 1945 with the Northern Group of Forces.
- 82nd Rifle Division — established Perm in 1932. Sent to Far East, returned for Moscow counter-attack in December 1941. Was a motorized division until March 1942. Became 3rd Guards Motorized Rifle Division in Mar 1942 which unit later became the 6th Guards Mechanized Corps (and finally 90th Guards Tank Division many years later). Recreated in July 1942. Fought in Poland in 1945. With 47th Army of the 1st Belorussian Front May 1945. Disbanded in the summer of 1945 with the Group of Soviet Forces in Germany.
- 83rd Mountain Rifle Division – Formed on 1 July 1935 established at Ashkabad as 83rd Turkestan mountain rifle division. Fought at Krasnodar and in Kuban. Became the 128th Guards Rifle Division in October 1943. Today it's the 128th Mechanized Brigade (Ukraine).
- 83rd Rifle Division — Formed at Loutti in January 1944 as a regular rifle division. Fought in the Petsamo-Kirkenes Offensive and Karelia. With 14th Army in northern Norway in May 1945.
- 84th Rifle Division — established at Tula before 1928. Fought near Stalingrad, Voronezh, Kursk, Kharkov, Iasi, Targul Frumos, and Budapest. With 57th Army of the 3rd Ukrainian Front 5.45. Disbanded with the Southern Group of Forces in the summer of 1945.
- 85th Rifle Division. With 42nd Army of the Kurland Group (Leningrad Front) May 1945.
- 86th Rifle Division — established at Laurovo February 1941. Fought near Leningrad, Tartu, and in East Prussia. With 2nd Shock Army of the 2nd Belorussian Front May 1945.
- 87th Rifle Division — established at Sverdlovsk in 1937. Apparently wiped out in the summer of 1941?. Recreated in November 1941 from 3rd Airborne Corps (Soviet Union); became 13th Guards Rifle Division (Soviet Union). Recreated at Citorol in May 1942. Fought at Stalingrad with less than 800 effectives. Fought in Ukraine, Crimea, and in Kurland. With the 51st Army of the Kurland Group (Leningrad Front) in May 1945.
- 88th Rifle Division — established at Archangelsk before September 1939. Fought in Winter War with Finland, and was in Archangelsk MD on 22 June 1941. Became 23rd Guards Rifle Division in Mar 1942. Recreated at Kisner in Apr 1942. Fought in Belorussia and East Prussia. With the 31st Army of the 1st Ukrainian Front in May 1945. Disbanded in the summer of 1945 with the Central Group of Forces.
- 89th Rifle Division — established at Kursk before June 1941. Wiped out at Vyazma October 1941. Recreated Yerevan Jan 1942. Armenian national formation. Fought in Ukraine, Crimea, and Pomerania. Postwar in Georgia. Disbanded as 12th Military Base in 2008.
- 90th Rifle Division — established at Leningrad in 1936. Fought at Leningrad and in Estonia and East Prussia. With 2nd Shock Army of the 2nd Belorussian Front May 1945.

=== 91–100 ===
- 91st Rifle Division — established at Achinsk in Sep 1939. Wiped out at Vyazma Oct 1941. Recreated Mahachkala in Apr 1942. Fought at Stalingrad and Kursk, and in Ukraine, Crimea, and Latvia. With 51st Army of the Kurland Group (Leningrad Front) May 1945.
- 92nd Rifle Division — established at Barabash before Apr 1937. 22 June 1941 with 39th Rifle Corps, 25th Army, Soviet Far East Front. Wiped out at Volkhov Jun 1942. Recreated from 20th NKVD Division at Tikhvin post-6.42. With 59th Army of the 1st Ukrainian Front 5.45. Disbanded in the summer of 1945 with the Central Group of Forces.
- 93rd Rifle Division — First formation established at Chita in 1936. Became 26th Guards Rifle Division in Apr 1942. Second formation formed at Dzerzhinsk Jul 1942. Fought in Ukraine and Yugoslavia. With 26th Army of the 3rd Ukrainian Front 5.45.
- 94th Rifle Division — established at Krasnoyarsk 1932. Spent war in Transbaikal region. With 36th Army of the Transbaikal Front 5.45.
- 95th Rifle Division — established at Kotovski in 1940, was with the 9th Army in June 1941. Wiped out at Sevastopol May 1942. Recreated at Tula from units of 13th NKVD Motorized Rifle Division in Sep 1942. Fought at Stalingrad. Became 75th Guards Rifle Division March 1943. Recreated Kaluga Apr 1943. Fought near Kursk and in Belorussia. With 33rd Army of the 1st Belorussian Front May 1945. Disbanded in the summer of 1945 with the Group of Soviet Forces in Germany.
- 96th Mountain Rifle Division — established Vinnitsa 1923. Converted to rifle division Oct 1941. Recreated Jul 1942. Fought at Stalingrad, in Belorussia, East Prussia, and near Berlin. With 48th Army of the 3rd Belorussian Front May 1945.
- 97th Rifle Division — established at Zhmerynka before 1940. The 377th OTB of the 97th Rifle Division arrived at the front he Winter War on 28 January 1940 with 31 T-26s (including 11 twin-turreted) and 6 KhT-26 flame-throwing tanks. With 6th Rifle Corps, 6th Army of the Southwestern Front from 22 June 1941. (See ru:97-я стрелковая дивизия (1-го формирования)) Wiped out at Kiev Sep 1941. Recreated Divisionnaya Jan 1942. Became 83rd Guards Rifle Division Apr 1943. Recreated Belev May 1943. Fought near Vitebsk, Vilnius, and in Hungary. With 5th Army of the RVGK 5.45.
- 98th Rifle Division — established at Ishevsk Feb 1941. Wiped out at Vyazma October 1941. Recreated Spassk October 1941. Fought in Stalingrad. Became 86th Guards Rifle Division Apr 1943. Recreated at Leningrad from 250th Rifle Brigade. Fought vicinity Leningrad. With the 59th Army of the 1st Ukrainian Front in May 1945. Disbanded in the summer of 1945 with the Central Group of Forces.
- 99th Rifle Division — Established at Uman in 1924. Took part in Soviet invasion of Poland (1939) with the Ukrainian Front. Recognized as one of the best divisions in the Army under Andrey Vlasov's command in 1940. Started Operation Barbarossa with 8th Rifle Corps, 26th Army, Southwestern Front. Wiped out at Izyum in May 1942. Recreated Balachov in August 1942. Fought at Stalingrad. Became 88th Guards Rifle Division Apr 1943. Recreated from 99th Rifle Brigade May 1943. Fought near Zhitomir and in Carpathia. With 46th Army of the 2nd Ukrainian Front in May 1945. Disbanded 1945–46.
- 100th Rifle Division — established at Berdichev November 1923. Fought in Winter War. Became the 1st Guards Rifle Division in September 1941. Recreated Vologda Mar 1942. Fought near Stalingrad, and in Ukraine and Belorussia. With 60th Army of the 4th Ukrainian Front May 1945. Disbanded in the summer of 1945 with the Northern Group of Forces.

=== 101–110 ===
- 101st Motorized Rifle Division — Fought at the Battle of Moscow 1941. On Sakhalin Island as the 101st Rifle Division May—August 1945, with the independent Sakhalin command.
- 102nd Rifle Division — (training camp on 1 June 1941, Kharkov Military District). Disbanded in October 1941. Recreated at Chimkent in January 1942. Again recreated from Far East NKVD Division at Khabarovsk June 1942, and joined 70th Army. Fought at Demyansk, Kursk, and in Belorussia. With 48th Army of the 3rd Belorussian Front May 1945.
- 103rd Rifle Division — fought in Winter War. Converted to a motorized division in March 1941. Wiped out at Vyazma in October 1941. Recreated at Samarkand in January 1942. Fought at Kharkov, wiped out at Izyum May 1942. Recreated ?; with 2nd Rifle Corps in Transbaikal Front in January 1945; still a part of the 2nd Rifle Corps on 9 August 1945, and was a part of the 36th Army, Transbaikal Front.
- 104th Rifle Division — established at Kandalaksha before December 1939, fought at Petsamo and on Kandalaksha axis. With 57th Army of the 3rd Ukrainian Front 5.45. Disbanded with the Southern Group of Forces in the summer of 1945.
- 105th Rifle Division — established at Ussuriysk 1936, stationed in the Far East. With the 25th Army of the independent coastal group in the Far East May 1945.
- 106th Rifle Division — established at Zolotonosha before June 1941, and with 9th Rifle Corps, Odesa Military District, in June 1941. Wiped out at Vyazma 10.41. Recreated October 1941 and destroyed at Kerch 11.41. Recreated at Krasnodar 12.41 and wiped out in the Caucasus 8.42. Created again at Chita from the Transbaikal NKVD Division November 1942, fought at Demyansk, Kursk, on the Dnieper River, and at Berlin. With 3rd Guards Army of the 1st Ukrainian Front 5.45.
- 107th Rifle Division — established at Moscow before 6.41, fought at Yelnaya and became 5th Guards Rifle Division in October 1941. Recreated at Tambov 3.42, fought in Ukraine and at Kraków. With 60th Army of the 4th Ukrainian Front 5.45. Disbanded in the summer of 1945 with the Northern Group of Forces.
- 108th Rifle Division — established at Vyazma in March 1941. Composed of the 407th, 444th, and 539th Rifle and 575th Artillery Regiments. Fought at Minsk, Smolensk, and Yartsevo in 1941. Later fought at Kursk and in Poland and Hungary. With 65th Army of the 2nd Belorussian Front May 1945. Disbanded June 1946 with the Northern Group of Forces.
- 109th Rifle Division — established as a motorized division July 1940 in the Transbaikal region. Wiped out at Smolensk August 1941. Recreated at Samarkand the same month. Wiped out at Sevastopol May 1942. Recreated at Leningrad August 1942. With the 8th Army of the Leningrad Front May 1945.
- 110th Rifle Division — Formed September 1939. with the 50th Army of the 3rd Belorussian Front May 1945.

=== 111–120 ===
- 111th Rifle Division formed at Vologda in 1940 and was in the Archangelsk Military District on 22 June 1941. fought at Ostrov and became the 24th Guards Rifle Division in March 1942. Recreated at Kalinin in June 1942, fought at Kursk and Iasi. With the 52nd Army of the 1st Ukrainian Front in May 1945.
- 112th Rifle Division — established at Vyazma prior to July 1941, and wiped out in October 1941. Recreated at Novosibirsk in April 1942, fought at Stalingrad, Kiev, Korosten, Zhitomir, Poland and Germany. With the 6th Army of the 1st Ukrainian Front in May 1945. Disbanded in the summer of 1945 with the Central Group of Forces.
- 113th Rifle Division — established at Rylsk in August 1939 and wiped out at Minsk July 1941. Recreated at Moscow from 5th Moscow People's Militia Division in July 1941, fought at Moscow, Vyazma, and Rogan. With 57th Army of the 3rd Ukrainian Front 5.45. Disbanded with the Southern Group of Forces in the summer of 1945.
- 114th Rifle Division — established in Transbaikal June 1941, fought on the Svir River, northern Finland and Norway. With the 14th Army in northern Norway in May 1945. Had small Norwegian attachments. Disbanded in 1946.
- 115th Rifle Division — established at Nalchik in 1940. Fought near Murmansk, Leningrad, and Novgorod. With the 43rd Army of the 2nd Belorussian Front in May 1945. Disbanded in the summer of 1945 with the Northern Group of Forces.
- 116th Rifle Division — established at Kremenchuk prior to June 1941 and wiped out at Kiev in September 1941. Recreated at Chita 12.41, fought at Stalingrad, Kharkiv, and Targul Frumos. With 52nd Army of the 1st Ukrainian Front 5.45.
- 117th Rifle Division — established at Kuibyshev in September 1939, wiped out at Kiev in September 1941. Recreated at Ivanovo 1.42, fought at Kerch, the Puławy Bridgehead, Poznań, and Berlin. With 69th Army of the 1st Belorussian Front 5.45. Disbanded in the summer of 1945 with the Group of Soviet Forces in Germany.
  - 118th Rifle Division — established at Kostroma in June 1941, fought at Pskov and wiped out at Vyazma October 1941. Recreated, became the 85th Guards Rifle Division 4.43. Created again at Novocherkassk 5.43 from the 52nd and 152nd Rifle Brigades, fought near Melitipol and in Poland. With 5th Guards Army of the 1st Ukrainian Front May 1945.
- 119th Rifle Division — established at Krasnoyarsk prior to July 1941 and became 17th Guards Rifle Division in March 1942. Recreated at Moscow the same month. fought at Stalingrad and became 54th Guards Rifle Division 12.42. Created again from 161st Rifle Brigade at Alexin 4.43, fought at Kursk. With 22nd Army of the Reserve of the Supreme High Command (RVGK) in May 1945.
- 120th Rifle Division — established at Ashkabad prior to August 1941, became 6th Guards Rifle Division 26.9.41. Recreated at Kilogriv 8.42, fought at Stalingrad, became 69th Guards Rifle Division 2.43. Created again from the 11th Rifle Brigade at Schlusselburg 4.43, fought at Narva. With 21st Army of the 1st Ukrainian Front in May 1945. Disbanded in the summer of 1945 with the Central Group of Forces.

=== 121–130 ===
- 121st Rifle Division — Formed at Mogilev in September 1939, fought at Rylsk and Kiev. With the 38th Army of the 4th Ukrainian Front in May 1945.
- 122nd Rifle Division — established at Rylsk 4.39, fought at Kandalaksha. With 57th Army of the 3rd Ukrainian Front 5.45. Disbanded with the Southern Group of Forces in the summer of 1945.
- 123rd Rifle Division — established at Vishny Volochek in 1939. Fought in Winter War with Finland, and subsequently in northern Russia. With the 67th Army of the Leningrad Front in May 1945.
- 124th Rifle Division — established at Kirovograd 9.39 and wiped out near Kiev 9.41. Recreated at Voronezh, fought at Stalingrad and became the 50th Guards Rifle Division 11.42. Created again Schlusselberg from the 56th, 102nd, and 138th Rifle Brigades 4.43, fought at Mga, Neman, and in Manchuria. With 39th Army of the RVGK 5.45.
- 125th Rifle Division — established at Kirov prior to 6.40, fought near Leningrad. With 21st Army of the 1st Ukrainian Front 5.45. Disbanded in the summer of 1945 with the Central Group of Forces.
- 126th Rifle Division — established at Moscow Dec 1940, and was with Eleventh Army in June 1941. Second division with same number established at Vorishilov Sep 1941. Original incarnation of division disbanded Dec 1941. Second incarnation of division fought at Stalingrad, Melitopol, and in Ukraine and Crimea. With 43rd Army of the 2nd Belorussian Front May 1945. The lineage and traditions of the second formation of the division were taken up by the 126th Motor Rifle Division, finally disbanded in 1996, and then the 126th Coastal Defence Brigade of the Coastal Troops of the Russian Navy, established in the Temporarily occupied and uncontrolled territories of Ukraine in 2014.
- 127th Rifle Division — (training camp on 10 June 1941, Kharkov Military District). Established at Kharkov July 1940, fought at Yelna and became the 2nd Guards Rifle Division on 18 September 1941. Recreated at Atkarsk Feb 1942, fought near Stalingrad, became 62nd Guards Rifle Division 1.43. Third formation created 5.43 from the 52nd and 98th Rifle Brigades. Fought in Ukraine and Poland. With 3rd Guards Army of the 1st Ukrainian Front 5.45. Disbanded in the summer of 1945 with the Central Group of Forces.
- 128th Mountain Rifle Division — originally formed 1920s as 1st Turkestan RD. Possibly with Eleventh Army in June 1941. Fought near Leningrad and at Kattowitz. With 21st Army of the 1st Ukrainian Front 5.45. Disbanded in the summer of 1945 with the Central Group of Forces.
- 129th Rifle Division — established at Moscow from 2nd Moscow Militia Division Jun 1941. Fought at Smolensk, Yartsevo, and Vyazma; wiped out at Vyazma Oct 1941. Recreated at Moscow Oct 1941. Fought in southern Russia, at Orel, and in Poland and the Baltic regions. With Third Army of the 1st Belorussian Front May 1945.
- 130th Rifle Division — established at Romny August 1939 and wiped out at Vyazma October 1941. Reactivated at Moscow on basis of 3rd Moscow Communist Rifle Division 22.1.42 and became 53rd Guards Rifle Division 12.42. Activated again from 152nd, 156th, and 159th Rifle Brigades at Matveyev Kurgan 1.43, fought at Taganrog, Brest, and Gumbinnen. With the 28th Army of the 1st Ukrainian Front in May 1945.

=== 131–140 ===
- 131st Rifle Division — established at Novograd Volynsky in November 1939. Wiped out at Kiev in September 1941. Recreated at Kirov in January 1942. With 62nd Army at Stalingrad. With 8th Army of the Leningrad Front May 1945.
- 132nd Rifle Division — established at Poltava prior to September 1939, fought at Bryansk, Voronezh, on the Dnieper River, in Poland, and at Berlin. With the 47th Army of the 1st Belorussian Front in May 1945.
- 133rd Rifle Division — established at Biysk prior to June 1941, became the 18th Guards Rifle Division in March 1942. Recreated at Kostroma June 1942, fought at Smolensk, Targul Frumos, and Iasi. With 40th Army of the 2nd Ukrainian Front 5.45. Disbanded in the summer of 1945 with the Central Group of Forces.
- 134th Rifle Division — established at Kramatorsk 6.41 and wiped out at Vyazma in October 1941. Recreated at Solnechnogorsk February 1942, fought near Kalinin, in the Puławy Bridgehead, and at Berlin. With 69th Army of the 1st Belorussian Front May 1945. Disbanded in the summer of 1945 with the Group of Soviet Forces in Germany.
- 135th Rifle Division — established in Kiev Military District 9.39, joined 40th Army when the Army was formed, but then wiped out during the Battle of Kiev in September 1941. Recreated at Kolomna in February 1942 from the 401st Rifle Division. Fought near Kalinin, Kiev, Targul Frumos, and Katowice. With the 6th Army (Soviet Union) of the 1st Ukrainian Front in May 1945. Disbanded in the summer of 1945 with the Central Group of Forces.
- 136th Rifle Division — First formation established at Leninakan prior to 1939. Became 15th Guards Rifle Division February 1942. Second formation recreated from the 8th Separate Rifle Brigade (Hanko Brigade) in Karelia Mar 1942. Fought at Leningrad; became 63rd Guards Rifle Division (30th Guards Rifle Corps) on 19 January 1943. Recreated at Leninakan in February 1943. Fought in Ukraine, at Targul Frumos and Gdynia, and in the Berlin Operation. With 70th Army of the 2nd Belorussian Front May 1945. Disbanded in the summer of 1945 with the Group of Soviet Forces in Germany.
- 137th Rifle Division — established at Gorki prior to February 1939. Fought on Central Front, at Kursk, and in Belorussia, the Carpathians, northern Poland, and Kurland. With 48th Army of the 3rd Belorussian Front May 1945.
- 138th Rifle Division — Formed in 1939 in Kalinin Oblast. Fought with 7th Army during the Winter War against Finland. At Leninakan in June 1941. With 51st Army on 1 February 1942. Wiped out at Kerch May 1942, and recreated same month. Fought at Stalingrad and became 70th Guards Rifle Division on 6 February 1943. Raised again at Kalinin 5.43 from the 6th Naval Rifle brigade and the 109th Motor Rifle Brigade. Fought in the Carpathians. With 18th Army of the 4th Ukrainian Front 5.45.
- 139th Rifle Division — Formed three times, in 1939 and twice in 1941. Disbanded in the summer of 1945 with the Group of Soviet Forces in Germany.
- 140th Rifle Division — established at Uman September 1939. Wiped out at Nikolayev August 1941. Recreated from the 13th Moscow People's Rifle Division at Moscow July 1941. Wiped out at Vyazma October 1941. Recreated at Kanasch January 1942. Inactivated August 1942. Recreated at Novorossiysk November 1942. Fought at Kursk, Zhitomir, Lvov, in Carpathia, and at Prague. With 38th Army of the 4th Ukrainian Front May 1945.

=== 141–150 ===
- 141st Rifle Division — established at Slavyansk September 1939. Wiped out at Nikolayev Aug 1941. Recreated at Kazan Jan 1942. Fought at Kharkiv, Voronezh, Kiev, Stanislav, and in the Carpathians. With 7th Guards Army of the 2nd Ukrainian Front May 1945. Disbanded in the summer of 1945 with the Central Group of Forces.
- 142nd Rifle Division — established at Hiitola prior to June 1941. Fought in the Continuation War and in East Prussia. With the 2nd Belorussian Front in May 1945. Disbanded in the summer of 1945 with the Northern Group of Forces.
- 143rd Rifle Division — established at Gomel prior to June 1941. Wiped out at Bryansk October 1941. Recreated at Korosten Dec 1943. Fought at Kovel, Praga, and Warsaw. With 47th Army of the 1st Belorussian Front May 1945.
- 144th Rifle Division — established at Ivanovo in the autumn of 1939. Fought at Moscow, Smolensk, in Belorussia, at Vilnius and stormed Kaunas 31 Jul 1944. Later fought in East Prussia (Königsberg) and in Manchuria. With Fifth Army of the Stavka RVGK Reserve May 1945.
- 145th Rifle Division — established at Belgorod prior to June 1941. Fought at Smolensk; wiped out at Roslavl August 1941. Recreated at Balachna Jan 1942. Fought at Chelm and Vitebsk, then in the Baltic lands and Poland.
- 146th Rifle Division — established at Bedichev July 1940. Wiped out at Kiev September 1941. Recreated at Kazan January 1942. With 3rd Shock Army of the 1st Belorussian Front May 1945.
- 147th Rifle Division — established at Lubny September 1939. Fought at Kiev and wiped out there Aug 1941. Goff, 1998, says reformed from 426th RD about 28 January 1942. Fought at Stalingrad, in Ukraine, and at Berlin. With 13th Army of the 1st Ukrainian Front May 1945.
- 148th Rifle Division — established at Engels prior to July 1941. Fought at Voronezh, Kursk, Chernigov, Shepetovka, Ternopol, and Lvov. With 60th Army of the 4th Ukrainian Front May 1945. Disbanded in the summer of 1945 with the Northern Group of Forces.
- 149th Rifle Division — established at Ostrogozhsk prior to June 1941. Fought at Smolensk and Yelnya; wiped out at Vyazma October 1941. Recreated at Ryazan around 27 Jan 1942 from the 427th Rifle Division. Fought at Lenino and Volyinskiy. With 3rd Guards Army of the 1st Ukrainian Front 5.45. Disbanded in the summer of 1945 with the Central Group of Forces.
- 150th Rifle Division — established at Vyazma September 1939. Wiped out at Izyum May 1942. Recreated at Turga Aug 1942. Fought at Schneidemühl, Königsberg, and Berlin. Stormed the Reichstag building in April 1945. With 3rd Shock Army of the 1st Belorussian Front May 1945.

=== 151–160 ===
- 151st Rifle Division — established at Udshary prior to Jun 1941. Wiped out at Kiev Sep 1941. Recreated at Udshary Oct 1941. Served on Turkish frontier. Fought at Zhmerinka and Stanislav, in the Carpathians and Hungary, and at Budapest. With 26th Army of the 3rd Ukrainian Front 5.45. Disbanded with the Southern Group of Forces in the summer of 1945.
- 152nd Rifle Division — established at Chita prior to 1939. Fought at Smolensk and Yartsevo; wiped out at Vyazma Oct 1941. Recreated in north Urals Jan 1942 (Goff, 1998, says reformed from 430th RD about 22 January 1942). Fought in Karelia, at Dnipropetrovsk, in East Prussia, and at Berlin. With 28th Army of the 1st Ukrainian Front 5.45.
- 153rd Rifle Division — became the 3rd Guards Rifle Division in September 1941; Re-activated in early 1942 as the 153rd Rifle Division; 31 December 1942 renamed the 57th Guards Rifle Division; with the 50th Army of the 3rd Belorussian Front in May 1945. 1957 renamed 57th Guards Motorized Rifle Division; attached to the Eighth Guards Army (1945–1990s).
- 154th Rifle Division — established at Ulyanovsk prior to Jun 1941. Fought in Bryansk Pocket and Kaluga. Became 47th Guards Rifle Division in Oct 1942. Recreated at Rzhev May 1943. With 2nd Guards Army of the 3rd Belorussian Front May 1945.
- 155th Rifle Division — established at Opotschka in 1939. Fought in the Winter War and wiped out at Bryansk 10.41. Recreated at Moscow from 4th Moscow Home Guard Rifle Division 1.42, fought at Kalinin, Kursk, in the Carpathians, and at Budapest. With 27th Army of the 3rd Ukrainian Front 5.45. Disbanded with the Southern Group of Forces in the summer of 1945.
- 156th Rifle Division — established at Staniza-Petrovska prior to Jun 1941. With 9th Rifle Corps of Odesa Military District in June 1941 and fought in Crimea. Disbanded Aug 1942. Recreated from 26th and 162nd Rifle Brigades at Kalinin Apr 1943. With 4th Shock Army of the Kurland Group (Leningrad Front) May 1945.
- 157th Rifle Division — established at Novocherkassk in 1939. Fought in Crimea and Stalingrad, became the 76th Guards Rifle Division in March 1943. Recreated from 148th Rifle Brigade at Kalinin March 1943, fought at Chernigov and Insterburg. With 5th Army of the RVGK 5.45.
- 158th Rifle Division — established at Yeysk in 1940. Wiped out at Smolensk Aug 1941. Recreated at Moscow from 5th Moscow Home Guard Rifle Division Jan 1942. Fought at Kalinin and Vitebsk. With 2nd Belorussian Front May 1945. Disbanded in the summer of 1945 with the Group of Soviet Forces in Germany.
- 159th Rifle Division — established at Belaya Tserkov 6.40, with 6th Rifle Corps, 6th Army of the Soviet Southwestern Front 22.6.41. Wiped out at Kiev 9.41 and recreated in the Urals the same month. Fought at Stalingrad and became the 61st Guards Rifle Division 1.43. Created again at Rzhev from the 20th Rifle and 49th Ski Brigades June 1943, fought at Vitebsk and Insterburg. With 5th Army of the RVGK 5.45. See also fr:159e division de fusiliers.
- 160th Rifle Division — established at Gorki from the 6th Moscow People's Militia Rifle Division Jun 1941. Second formation with same number while first still existed, formed Nov 1941. Fought at Kharkiv and Stalingrad. Became the 89th Guards Rifle Division Apr 1943. Created for third time at Gydnia March 1945. With 70th Army of the 2nd Belorussian Front May 1945. Disbanded in the summer of 1945 with the Group of Soviet Forces in Germany. Disbanded in 1955 in the Transcaucasus Military District by being renumbered 4th Rifle Division.

=== 161–170 ===
- 161st Rifle Division — formed in 1940, became the 4th Guards Rifle Division on 18 September 1941. Reformed for the second time in April (or June) 1942 from 13th Separate Rifle Brigade in Moscow MD. Fought at Kursk, in the Carpathians, and in Poland. With 1st Guards Army of the 4th Ukrainian Front May 1945. 24th Mechanised Division by 1955, 99th Motor Rifle Division 1957, then became 161st Motor Rifle Division in 1957. After 1990 became Ukrainian 161st Mechanised Brigade.
- 162nd Rifle Division — began assembly on 1 June 1941 in Kharkov Military District, established at Artemovsk prior to Jun 1941. Wiped out at Vyazma Oct 1941. Recreated at Verchniy Ufalev Jan 1942. Inactivated Jul 1942. Recreated at Tashkent from the Central Asia NKVD Division Oct 1942. Fought near Baranov, in Poland, and in the Berlin Operation. With 70th Army of the 2nd Belorussian Front May 1945. Disbanded in the summer of 1945 with the Group of Soviet Forces in Germany.
- 163rd Rifle Division — established at Vishny Volochev 7.30, was motorized by 9.39, later reverted to leg infantry. Fought at Suomussalmi (wiped out), Pskov, Demyansk, Kiev, Iasi, Budapest, and Vienna. With 27th Army of the 3rd Ukrainian Front 5.45.
- 164th Rifle Division — established at Orsha November 1939. Wiped out at Vyazma October 1941. Recreated at Lenino October 1943; with 4th Shock Army of the Kurland Group (Leningrad Front) May 1945. Became 16th Rifle Brigade 1946, became 73rd Mechanized Division October 1953, 121st Motor Rifle Division 1957.
- 165th Rifle Division — established at Ordzhonikidze prior to June 1941. Wiped out December 1941. Recreated at Kurgan December 1941. Fought at Gydnia in 1945. With 70th Army of the 2nd Belorussian Front May 1945. Disbanded in the summer of 1945 with the Group of Soviet Forces in Germany.
- 166th Rifle Division — established at Tomsk prior to June 1941. Wiped out Vyazma Oct 1941. Recreated Cherbarkul Jan 1942. Fought at Kursk and in Kurland. With 6th Guards Army of the Kurland Group (Leningrad Front) May 1945.
- 167th Rifle Division — established at Tula prior to 6.41 and wiped out at Rogachev 8.41. Recreated at Ssucho Lug 2.42, fought near Bryansk, at Kursk, in the Carpathians, and in Hungary. With 1st Guards Army of the 4th Ukrainian Front 5.45.
- 168th Rifle Division — established at Sortavala prior to 12.39, fought in Winter War. With 7th Army (Soviet Union) on 22 June 1941, fought near Leningrad and Stalingrad. With 22nd Army of the RVGK 5.45.
- 169th Rifle Division — established at Vinnitsa prior to 1940. Fought at Kiev, Uman, Stalingrad, Orel, and in East Prussia. With 3rd Army of the 1st Belorussian Front May 1945.
- 170th Rifle Division — established at Sterlitamak prior to Feb 1942. Recreated; fought at Demyansk, Staraya Russa, Kursk, Rechitsa, and in East Prussia and Kurland. With 48th Army of the 3rd Belorussian Front May 1945.

=== 171–180 ===
- 171st Rifle Division — established at Kamensk September 1939. Wiped out at Kiev in September 1941. Fought in battle for the Reichstag building in Berlin, Apr 1945.
- 172nd Rifle Division — established at Simferopol prior to 6.41 and wiped at Mogilev 7.41. Recreated from 3rd Crimean Rifle Division in 1941. Fought and destroyed at Sevastopol 7.42. Created again at Moscow 10.42, fought at Pavlograd, Kursk, and Kielce. With 13th Army of the 1st Ukrainian Front 5.45. Stayed with the 13th Army postwar in the Kiev Military District and became the 172nd MRD in 1965. Disbanded by becoming a weapons and equipment storage base in 1990 just before the collapse of the Soviet Union.
- 173rd Rifle Division — established at Gjassin in 1940 and wiped out at Uman August 1941. Recreated at Moscow from the 21st People's Militia Rifle Division 9.41. Fought at Tula and Stalingrad, became the 77th Guards Rifle Division 1.3.43. Created again at Staritsa from the 150th Rifle Brigade. Fought at Chernigov, Lenino, and Minsk. With 31st Army of the 1st Ukrainian Front 5.45. Disbanded in the summer of 1945 with the Central Group of Forces.
- 174th Rifle Division — established at Kurgan 8.40 and became 20th Guards Rifle Division 17.3.42. Created again at Starobelsk from the 130th Motorized Rifle Brigade in April 1942 and became 46th Guards Rifle Division 10.42. Recreated at Kaluga from the 28th Rifle Brigade 4.43, fought at Kursk, and in Belorussia and East Prussia. With 31st Army of the 1st Ukrainian Front 5.45. Disbanded in the summer of 1945 with the Central Group of Forces.
- 175th Rifle Division — established at Prokladny prior to 6.41, wiped out at Kiev 9.41. Recreated at Tyumen 3.42, fought near Stalingrad and inactivated there 9.42. Recreated again at Sverdlovsk after 10.42, fought at Demyansk and in Belorussia. With 47th Army of the 1st Belorussian Front May 1945.
- 176th Rifle Division — established at Krivoy Rog in April 1941, with 9th Army in June 1941. Fought at Novorossiysk and became 129th Guards Rifle Division 10.43. Created again at Maselkaya from the 65th and 80th Naval Rifle Brigades 3.44. With 31st Army of the 1st Ukrainian Front 5.45. Disbanded in the summer of 1945 with the Central Group of Forces.
- 177th Rifle Division — established at Leningrad prior to June 1941. Fought in northern areas of front. With 23rd Army of the Leningrad Front) May 1945.
- 178th Rifle Division — established at Omsk prior to Jun 1941. With 23rd Army of the Leningrad Front) May 1945.
- 179th Rifle Division — Established at Vilnius in 1940. With 29th Rifle Corps of Eleventh Army on 22 June 1941. Fought at Kalinin, Gomel, and Vitebsk; with 4th Shock Army of the Kurland Group (Leningrad Front) May 1945.
- 180th Rifle Division — formed 1940 in the Baltic Special MD; became 28th Guards Rifle Division 3 May 1942, recreated at Tscherepowez 6.42, fought at Kiev, Targul Frumos, and Budapest. With 53rd Army of the 2nd Ukrainian Front in May 1945. Briefly 14th Rifle Division in the mid-1950s, assigned directly to Odesa Military District headquarters. Then became 88th Motor Rifle Division 1957, but became 180th Kiev Red Banner Orders of Suvorov and Kutuzov Motor Rifle Division in 1965 and remained under that title until the 1990s, based at Belgorod-Dnestrovsky. After 1992 became Ukrainian 27th Mechanised Brigade.

=== 181–190 ===
- 181st Rifle Division — established at Gulbene in 1940, from elements of the Latvian Army. Wiped out at Staraya Russa in September 1941. Recreated at Stalingrad, wiped out at Kalach 8.42. Created again at Chelyabinsk from 10th NKVD Division 2.43, fought at Demyansk, Korosten, and in Poland and Germany. With 6th Army of the 1st Ukrainian Front 5.45. Disbanded in the summer of 1945 with the Central Group of Forces.
- 182nd Rifle Division — established at Dorpat prior to June 1941. Fought near Novgorod and Leningrad. With 43rd Army of the 2nd Belorussian Front May 1945. Disbanded in the summer of 1945 with the Northern Group of Forces.
- 183rd Rifle Division — established at Wenden (Cēsis, Latvia?) from elements of the Latvian Army prior to 6.41, fought at Rzhev, Kursk, Lvov, and in the Carpathians. With 38th Army of the 4th Ukrainian Front 5.45.
- 184th Rifle Division — With 29th Rifle Corps of 11th Army on 22.6.41. Part of 5th Army of the Reserve of the Supreme High Command, May 1945.
- 185th Rifle Division — established at Belgorod 9.39, fought at Ryabinki 12.41 and in Belorussia in 1944. With 47th Army of the 1st Belorussian Front May 1945.
- 186th Rifle Division — established at Ufa in 1928. Fought at Leningrad, in Karelia, at Gomel, and in Belorussia and Poland. (The 1st Polar Rifle Division (2 Rifle Regiments+Artillery Regiment) was formed on 12 September 1941. One regiment was called Communist and another was formed from amnestied prisoners who had been convicted for a small stretches. In October 1941 the 290th Rifle Regiment formed from man-of-war's men was joint to it. In Sept. 1941 renamed into 186th Rifle Division. On 26 June 1943 again renamed into 205th Rifle Division (2nd formation)). 186 RD was with 65th Army of the 2nd Belorussian Front May 1945. Disbanded June 1946 with the Northern Group of Forces.
- 187th Rifle Division — 6,000 men, began assembly on 10 June 1941, Kharkov MD; established Chernigov prior to 6.41 and wiped out at Kiev 9.41. Recreated, with the 1st Red Banner Army of the independent coastal group in the Far East 5.45.
- 188th Rifle Division — established at Kazan prior to 6.41, with 29th Rifle Corps of 11th Army on 22.6.41. Fought in central Russia and Ukraine. With 37th Army in Bulgaria 5.45. Gained honorifics Lower Dnieper Red Banner and eventually became the 46th Rocket Division of the Strategic Rocket Forces, which finally disbanded in Ukraine in the 1990s.
- 189th Rifle Division — established at Leningrad prior to June 1941. Fought at Tartu and in Kurland. With 67th Army of the Leningrad Front May 1945.
- 190th Rifle Division — established at Cherkassy prior to 6.41 and wiped out at Rzhev 10.41. With the 25th Army of the independent coastal group in the Far East 5.45.

=== 191–200 ===
- 191st Rifle Division — established at Leningrad prior to June 1941. Fought at Kingisepp, Oranienbaum, Tikhvin, Narva, and Tartu. With 49th Army of the 2nd Belorussian Front May 1945. Disbanded in the summer of 1945 with the Group of Soviet Forces in Germany.
- 192nd Rifle Division — established prewar and in 1940 in Western Ukraine. Began the Second World War with 13th Rifle Corps of 12th Army. Destroyed by early August 1942 in the Battle of Uman and formally disestablished in September 1942. Thereafter the 192 Rifle Division first formation) formed in the vicinity of Rostov-on-Don on 24 April 1942 on the basis of the 102nd independent Rifle Brigade. Division inactivated in August 1942. Thereafter the 192nd Rifle Division (2nd formation) was created (again) within the Western Front in March to May 1943, fought in Belorussia. With 39th Army of the Reserve of the Supreme High Command in May 1945. The division became the 1st Orsha-Khingan Red Banner Escort Department of the Internal Troops of the Soviet Union in 1945–46. It eventually became today's Central Orsha-Khingan Red Banner National Guard District.
- 193rd Rifle Division — established at Korosten May 1941. Wiped out at Kiev September 1941. Recreated at Sorotschinik May 1942. Fought at Stalingrad, and in Belorussia and Poland. With 105th Rifle Corps, 65th Army of the 2nd Belorussian Front May 1945.
- 194th Rifle Division — established prior to August 1941. Fought at Yelnaya, Moscow, Stalingrad, Kursk, in Belorussia, East Prussia, and Kurland. With the 48th Army of the 3rd Belorussian Front in May 1945. Became 194th RD c.1951 and then 18th Rifle Division c. 1955, while with 10th Rifle Corps, Kirov, Ural Military District, and then 43rd Mechanised Division 5 June 1956. Then 130th Motor Rifle Division 1957-59.
- 195th Rifle Division — established at Ovruch prior to 6.41 and wiped out at Kiev 9.41. Recreated in the Urals 3.42 from 423rd RD, fought at Stalingrad and in Ukraine. With 37th Army in Bulgaria 5.45. Disbanded July 1946 with 66th Rifle Corps in the Odesa Military District.
- 196th Rifle Division — established at Dnipropetrovsk Jul 1941. Wiped out at Kiev Sep 1941. Recreated at Kisner Jan 1942. Fought at Stalingrad with 62nd Army. Fought in East Prussia and Kurland. With 67th Army of the Leningrad Front May 1945.
- 197th Rifle Division — established at Kiev 4.41 and wiped out at Uman 8.41. Recreated at Krasnodar 3.42, fought at Stalingrad and became the 59th Guards Rifle Division 1.43. Again created at Kubyshev 2.43, fought at Bryansk and in Poland. With 3rd Guards Army of the 1st Ukrainian Front 5.45. Disbanded in the summer of 1945 with the Central Group of Forces.
- 198th Rifle Division — established as a motorized division at Leningrad June 1941. Inactivated Dec 1941 and recreated at Rybinsk post-1941. With the 10th Guards Army of the Kurland Group (Leningrad Front) May 1945.
- 199th Rifle Division — established at Novosibirsk May 1941. Fought at Lake Ilmen and Kharkov. Inactivated in September 1942. Recreated at Kalinin from the 126th and 128th Rifle Brigades in Feb 1943. Fought at Smolensk and in East Prussia. With the 49th Army of the 2nd Belorussian Front in May 1945. Disbanded in the summer of 1945 with the Group of Soviet Forces in Germany.
- 200th Rifle Division — established at Belokorovichi prior to Jun 1941. Wiped out at Kiev Sep 1941. Recreated at Busulusk February 1942 from 425th Rifle Division. Fought in Belorussia, at Gydnia, and at Berlin. With 49th Army of the 2nd Belorussian Front May 1945. Disbanded in the summer of 1945 with the Group of Soviet Forces in Germany.

=== 201–210 ===
- 201st Rifle Division — established Aug 1941 at Gorki. Became 43rd Guards Rifle Division Oct 1942. Recreated from 27th Rifle Brigade at Schlusselburg Nov 1943; with 1st Shock Army of the Kurland Group (Leningrad Front) May 1945.
- 202nd Rifle Division — established at Leningrad as motor rifle division by 1941. Reverted to leg infantry, fought at Sol'tsa, Kiev, and Korsun. With 27th Army of the 3rd Ukrainian Front 5.45. Disbanded with the Southern Group of Forces in the summer of 1945.
- 203rd Rifle Division — established at Vorishilovsk 2.41, fought at Stalingrad, Zaporizhia, and Budapest. With 53rd Army of the 2nd Ukrainian Front in May 1945.
- 204th Rifle Division — established at Volkovysk as motorized division in Apr 1941, and with 11th Mechanised Corps, 3rd Army in Jun 1941. Wiped out at Yelna Aug 1941. Recreated at Blagoveshensk Nov 1941. Fought at Stalingrad. Became 78th Guards Rifle Division. Recreated from 37th Rifle Brigade at Nelidovo Jul 1943. Fought at Kursk, in Belorussion Operation and in Kurland. With 51st Army of the Kurland Group (Leningrad Front) May 1945.
- 205th Rifle Division — established at Khabarovsk prior to Jun 1941. Apparently destroyed or disbanded. Recreated at Murmansk Oct 1941. Wiped out at Stalingrad Oct 1942. Recreated from 1st Polar Rifle Division and 186th Rifle Division Oct 1942. Fought at Danzig. With 19th Army of the 2nd Belorussian Front May 1945.
- 206th Rifle Division — established at Pavlograd prior to June 1941. Wiped out at Kiev September 1941. Recreated at Buguruslan January 1942. Fought at Stalingrad, Korsun, and Targul Frumos. Nearly wiped out during the Battle of the Korsun-Cherkassy Pocket as it attempted to halt the breakout of Group Stemmermann. With 27th Army of the 3rd Ukrainian Front May 1945.
- 207th Rifle Division — established at Ivanovo August 1942. Fought and destroyed at Stalingrad, August - October 1942. Recreated at Yelnya from 40th Rifle Brigade in the rear areas of the Soviet Western Front in June 1943. Fought in the Baltic countries and at Berlin. Consisting of 594th, 597th and 598th Rifle Regiments, cleared Kroll Opera House 30 April 1945 while fighting with 3rd Shock Army of the 1st Belorussian Front. From circa 1946 to 1965 numbered the 32nd Division; regained its original number as 207th Motor Rifle Division 1965. Served with Group of Soviet Forces in Germany until the fall of the Soviet Union (with 2nd Guards Tank Army for a long period).
- 208th Rifle Division — with 50th Army of the 3rd Belorussian Front May 1945.
- 209th Rifle Division — established at Ivye 4.41 as a motor rifle division. Wiped out at Minsk 7.41 and inactivated 9.41. Recreated 1944(?), part of 17th Army (Soviet Union) during the Soviet invasion of Manchuria, and with 36th Army of the Transbaikal Front 5.45.
- 210th Rifle Division — established March 1941 as a motorised division, fought at Rzhev 8.41. Reorganised as 4th Cavalry Division 1941. Reformed, With 36th Army of the Transbaikal Front 5.45.

=== 211–220 ===
- 211th Rifle Division — established at Zagorsk prior to 6.41 and wiped out at Vyazma 10.41. Recreated at Novossil 1.42 (Goff, 1998, says reformed from 429th RD about 16 Dec 1941), fought at Voronezh, Kursk, and Chenigov. With 1st Guards Army of the 4th Ukrainian Front 5.45.
- 212th Rifle Division — established at Cherkassy 6.41. In a report of 13 July 1941, the temporary commander of 15th Mechanised Corps said the division, 'with an almost full complement of Red Army soldiers, completely lacked vehicles for transporting personnel and could not even secure auto-transport for supply of ammunition, foodstuffs, and fuel and lubricants and also for the transportation of weapons.' Fought at Moscow, Kharkov, and Stalingrad. Inactivated at Stalingrad 11.42. Recreated at Ssuschinitschi from the 4th and 125th Rifle Brigades 6.43, fought at Kursk. With 61st Army of the 1st Belorussian Front 5.45. Disbanded in the summer of 1945 with the Group of Soviet Forces in Germany.
- 213th Rifle Division — established at Vinnitsa 3.41 and wiped out at Uman 8.41. Recreated at Katta Kurgan 1.42, fought at Kursk, Targul Frumos, and in the Vistula-Oder Operation. With 52nd Army of the 1st Ukrainian Front 5.45. Disbanded in the summer of 1945 with the Group of Soviet Forces in Germany.
- 214th Rifle Division — 6,000 establishment (commenced mobilisation at Luhansk on 10 June 1941, Kharkov MD); established at Vorishilovgrad 4.41 and wiped out at Vyazma 10.41. Recreated at Ufa 1.42, fought at Stalingrad, Voronezh, Kremenchug, Kirovograd, and the Puławy Bridgehead. With 52nd Army of the 1st Ukrainian Front 5.45.
- 215th Rifle Division — Formed May 1942 from 48th Rifle Brigade, fought at Smolensk and Vilnius. With 5th Army of the RVGK 5.45. Moved to the Far East and fought in the Soviet invasion of Manchuria.
- 216th Rifle Division — established at Staro Konstantinov in May 1941. Fought at Kharkiv and in Karelia, Crimea, and Kurland. With 50th Army of the 3rd Belorussian Front May 1945. 216 RD in Fourth Army (Soviet Union) until 1955. 1955 redesigned 34th Rifle Division, but then disbanded 7 July 1956.
- 217th Rifle Division — established at Voronezh Jun 1941. Fought at Yelnaya and wiped out in Bryansk Pocket. Recreated Pavlograd Oct 1941. Fought at Kaluga, near Kursk, and in Belorussia, East Prussia, and Kurland. With 48th Army of the 3rd Belorussian Front May 1945.
- 218th Rifle Division — established at Gusyatin prior to 6.41, inactivated 7.42. Recreated at Kiev 11.43, fought at Zhitomir. With 6th Army of the 1st Ukrainian Front 5.45. Disbanded in the summer of 1945 with the Central Group of Forces.
- 219th Rifle Division — established as motor rifle division at Kharkiv 4.41 and wiped out at Kiev 9.41. Recreated as rifle division at Kirssanov 5.42, fought near Stalingrad. With 22nd Army of the RVGK 5.45.
- 220th Rifle Division — established at Vyazma in 1941. Arrived from Orel Military District to join 19th Army, seemingly detached from 23rd Mechanised Corps in early July 1941. A report by 19th Army Chief of Staff, Major General Rubtsov, on 24 July 1941 said that the division was 'hardly formed as a motorised rifle division and had no tanks and vehicles and was understrength in artillery.' Fought at Yelnaya, Vyazma, Rzhev, Grodno, and Minsk. With 31st Army of the 1st Ukrainian Front 5.45. Disbanded in the summer of 1945 with the Central Group of Forces.

=== 221–230 ===
- 221st Rifle Division — established at Krasnoufimsk March 1942, fought at Stalingrad and inactivated 11.42. Recreated 6.43 from the 79th Rifle Brigade. Fought in East Prussia. With 39th Army of the RVGK 5.45.
- 222nd Rifle Division — established at Starodub April 1941. Fought at Yelnaya, Moscow, Mozhaisk, Smolensk, Lenino, Kalinin, and Mogilev. With 33rd Army of the 1st Belorussian Front May 1945. Disbanded in the summer of 1945 with the Group of Soviet Forces in Germany.
- 223rd 'Belgrade Red Banner Azerbaijan' Rifle Division— Azeri national formation. Established at Kuba 9.41, fought at Terek River, and in the Caucasus and Ukraine, and later in Yugoslavia. With 46th Army of the 2nd Ukrainian Front in May 1945.
- 224th Rifle Division — established at Suchum around December 1941. With 51st Army on 1 February 1942. Wiped out at Kerch May 1942. Recreated at Onenga Jun 1942. With 23rd Army of the Leningrad Front May 1945.
- 225th Rifle Division — established at Yerevan 10.41, fought at Novgorod and Kattowitz. With 21st Army of the 1st Ukrainian Front 5.45. Disbanded in the summer of 1945 with the Central Group of Forces.
- 226th Rifle Division — established at Orochevo 6.41, fought at Kharkov, inactivated 7.42. Recreated at Bugurusslan 9.42 and became 95th Guards Rifle Division 4.5.43. Created again at Lgov 7.43, fought at Kiev and Debica. With 38th Army of the 4th Ukrainian Front 5.45. Disbanded in the summer of 1945 with the Northern Group of Forces.
- 227th Rifle Division — (began assembly 1 June 1941, Kharkov Military District) established at Slavyansk April 1941, wiped out at Kharkiv in May 1942. Recreated from 19th Rifle and 84th Naval Rifle Brigades in the summer of 1942, fought at Kursk and in the Crimea. With 53rd Army of the 2nd Ukrainian Front May 1945. From autumn in 1945 it was deployed in Krasnoyarsk. In May 1946 it was disbanded by being reformed as 49th Separate Rifle Brigade. Lineage continued by 74th Mechanized Division 1950s, 74th MRD 1957, disbanded 1959.
- 228th Rifle Division — established at Zhitomir prior to June 1941 and wiped out at Kiev 9.41. Recreated at Kansk 11.41, fought at Stalingrad and in Ukraine. With 53rd Army of the 2nd Ukrainian Front 5.45. Disbanded in the summer of 1945 with the Central Group of Forces.
- 229th Rifle Division — established at Noginsk May 1941, fought at Stalingrad and wiped out at Kalach 8.42. Recreated at Volokolamsk 12.42, fought at Opole. With 1st Ukrainian Front 5.45. Disbanded in the summer of 1945 with the Central Group of Forces.
- 230th Rifle Division — established at Dnipropetrovsk July 1941. Fought in Uman Pocket Aug 1941. Inactivated Aug 1942. Recreated from 229th Rifle Brigade Jun 1943. Fought at Stalino and Berlin. With 5th Shock Army of the 1st Belorussian Front May 1945.

=== 231–240 ===
- 231st Rifle Division — established Kungur 1941, near Stalingrad 8.42 and inactivated 11.42. Recreated; with the 1st Red Banner Army of the independent coastal group in the Far East 5.45.
- 232nd Rifle Division — (began assembly 1 June 1941, Kharkov MD). Established at Chernigov prior to 6.41 and wiped out at Kiev 9.41. Recreated at Biysk 1.42, fought at Voronezh, Kiev, and Iasi. With 40th Army of the 2nd Ukrainian Front 5.45. Disbanded in the summer of 1945 with the Central Group of Forces.
- 233rd Rifle Division — established at Zvenigorod May 1941 and wiped out at Smolensk September 1941. Recreated at Naro Fominsk 8.42, fought at Stalingrad, Kremenchug, Iasi, and in Hungary. With 26th Army of the 3rd Ukrainian Front 5.45. Disbanded with the Southern Group of Forces in the summer of 1945.
- 234th Rifle Division — established at Kostroma from Yaroslavl Home Guard Division 6.41, fought on central part of front and in Warsaw. With 61st Army of the 1st Belorussian Front 5.45. Disbanded in the summer of 1945 with the Group of Soviet Forces in Germany.
- 235th Rifle Division — established at Nikopol in May 1941. Wiped out vicinity Luga Sep 1941. Recreated at Novosibirsk Mar 1942. Fought on central part of front, and at Vitebsk and Königsberg. With 43rd Army of the 2nd Belorussian Front May 1945.
- 236th Rifle Division — established at Kazakhstan Feb 1941, fought in the Crimea, the Caucasus, at Tuapse in the Kuban, and at Belgrade. With the 26th Army of the 3rd Ukrainian Front May 1945. Disbanded with the Southern Group of Forces in the summer of 1945.
- 237th Rifle Division — Established at Petrazadovsk April 1941, with Seventh Army (Soviet Union) on 22.6.41. Fought near Leningrad and destroyed there 9.41. Recreated at Stalinsk 2.42, fought on the Dnieper River, and in the Carpathians. With 1st Guards Army of the 4th Ukrainian Front 5.45. Disbanded in the summer of 1945 with the Northern Group of Forces.
- 238th Rifle Division — established in Kazakhstan (Turkestan Military District) in early June 1941. Formed from Poles and people of Polish ancestry. Fought near Moscow and became 30th Guards Rifle Division May 1942. Recreated at Arzamas in June 1942. Fought at Stalingrad, Karachev, and in Belorussia, Poland, and East Prussia. With 49th Army of the 2nd Belorussian Front May 1945. Disbanded in the summer of 1945 with the Group of Soviet Forces in Germany.
- 239th Rifle Division — established at Tambov prior to August 1941, fought at the Battle of Moscow and in the Carpathians. With 59th Army of the 1st Ukrainian Front 5.45. Disbanded in the summer of 1945 with the Central Group of Forces.
- 240th Rifle Division — established at Kupiansk prior to June 1941 and wiped out at Kiev 9.41. Recreated at Kupyansk 10.41, fought at Kursk, Kiev, Targul Frumos, and in the Carpathians. With 40th Army of the 2nd Ukrainian Front 5.45. Disbanded in the summer of 1945 with the Central Group of Forces.

=== 241–250 ===
- 241st Rifle Division — established at Vishniy Volocheck 10.41, fought at Kursk, Vinnitsa, and in the Carpathians. With 38th Army of the 4th Ukrainian Front 5.45. Disbanded with the Southern Group of Forces in the summer of 1945.
- 242nd Mountain Rifle Division — established at Moscow 7.41 and inactivated 10.41. Recreated at Grozny 3.42, fought at Mount Elbrus, in the Kuban and Taman Peninsula, at Kerch and Sevastopol. With 60th Army of the 4th Ukrainian Front 5.45.
- 243rd Rifle Division — established at Yaroslavl 7.41, fought at Smolensk, Zaporizhia, and in Ukraine. With 1st Guards Cavalry-Mechanized Group of the 2nd Ukrainian Front 5.45.
- 244th Rifle Division — established at Dimitrov 7.41 and wiped out at Vyazma 10.41. Recreated and merged with 469th Rifle Division at Stalingrad, fought at Zaporozhye. With 37th Army in Bulgaria 5.45.
- 245th Rifle Division — established at Vishniy Volocheck 7.41, fought at Kattowitz. With 59th Army of the 1st Ukrainian Front 5.45. Disbanded in the summer of 1945 with the Central Group of Forces.
- 246th Rifle Division — established at Rybinsk 7.41, fought at Kursk, in the Crimea, and at Kraków. With 60th Army of the 4th Ukrainian Front 5.45. Disbanded in the summer of 1945 with the Northern Group of Forces.
- 247th Rifle Division — established at Murom 7.41, fought at Kursk, the Puławy Bridgehead, and Berlin. With 69th Army of the 1st Belorussian Front 5.45. Disbanded in the summer of 1945 with the Group of Soviet Forces in Germany.
- 248th Rifle Division — established at Vyazma Jul 1941; wiped out there Oct 1941. Recreated at Astrakhan May 1942. Fought near Kharkiv May 1942 and wiped out at Izyum May 1942. Recreated at Astrakhan Jul 1942. Fought at Stalingrad, in Ukraine and Pomerania, and at Berlin. With 5th Shock Army of the 1st Belorussian Front May 1945.
- 249th Rifle Division — established in the Urals prior to 1941. Fought at Demyansk and Kalinin. Became the 16th Guards Rifle Division February 1942. Recreated at Chebarkul, March 1942, as an Estonian national formation. With 1st Shock Army of the Kurland Group (Leningrad Front) May 1945. Became 122nd Guards Rifle Division June 1945.
- 250th Rifle Division — established at Vladimir July 1941. Fought at Smolensk (1941), Kursk, Gomel, and in Belorussia. With the 3rd Army of the 1st Belorussian Front in May 1945.

=== 251–260 ===
- 251st Rifle Division — established at Kolomna July 1941. Fought at Smolensk, Moscow, Iasi, Targul Frumos, and in the Belorussian Operation and Kurland. With Soviet Second Guards Army of the 3rd Belorussian Front May 1945.
- 252nd Rifle Division — established at Serpukhov July 1941 and wiped out at Belyi 5.42. Recreated at Molotov 8.42, fought at Stalingrad, Kursk, Iasi, and Pressburg. With Seventh Guards Army of the 2nd Ukrainian Front 5.45.
- 253rd Rifle Division — established at Volochansk July 1941, fought at Rostov and Kharkiv before being wiped out at Izyum 5.42. Recreated at Chapyevsk 9.42, fought on the Dnieper River and Kalinkovichi. With 3rd Guards Army of the 1st Ukrainian Front 5.45. Disbanded in the summer of 1945 with the Central Group of Forces.
- 254th Rifle Division — established at Tula July 1941, fought at Staraya Russa, Demyansk, Kursk, Korsun, Iasi, and Czestochowa. With 52nd Army of the 1st Ukrainian Front 5.45.
- 255th Rifle Division — established at Pavlograd August 1941, fought in Uman Pocket, inactivated 7.42. Recreated ?, with 15th Army of the Far Eastern Front 5.45.
- 256th Rifle Division — established ?, fought at Smolensk, Moscow, and Kursk. With 22nd Army of the RVGK May 1945.
- 257th Rifle Division — established at Tula July 1941. Fought at Kerch and Velikiye Luki. Became 91st Guards Rifle Division Apr 1943. Recreated at Krimskaya from 9th Rifle, 60th Rifle, and 62nd Naval Rifle Brigades Jun 1943. With the 4th Shock Army of the Kurland Group (Leningrad Front) in May 1945.
- 258th Rifle Division — established at Orel July 1941, fought at Bryansk, Roslavl, and Tula. Became the 12th Guards Rifle Division 1.42. Recreated; with the 25th Army of the independent coastal group in the Far East 5.45.
- 259th Rifle Division — established at Serpukhov July 1941, fought at Leningrad and in Ukraine. With 37th Army in Bulgaria 5.45.
- 260th Rifle Division — established at Kalinin July 1941, fought at Bryansk and destroyed there 10.41. Recreated at Volokolamsk after 10.41. Fought at Moscow, Stalingrad, and in Belorussia and Poland. With 47th Army of the 1st Belorussian Front May 1945.

=== 261–270 ===
- 261st Rifle Division — established at Berdyansk July 1941, inactivated October 1942, subsequently recreated and with 45th Army of the Transcaucasus Front 5.45. After the war became 127th MRD and then, after the fall of the Soviet Union, the Russian 102nd Military Base in independent Armenia.
- 262nd Rifle Division — established at Vladimir July 1941, fought at Demidov, Tilsit, and in Manchuria. With 39th Army of the RVGK 5.45.
- 263rd Rifle Division — established at Vologda November 1941. Fought near Leningrad and in Ukraine and Crimea. With 43rd Army of the 2nd Belorussian Front May 1945.
- 264th Rifle Division — established at Poltava July 1941 and wiped out at Kiev September 1941. Recreated Svyatogorsk 5.42, became the 48th Guards Rifle Division 10.42. Recreated; with the 35th Army of the independent coastal group in the Far East 5.45.
- 265th Rifle Division — established at Leningrad, likely in 1941. Fought at Vyborg and Tortolovo. With 3rd Shock Army of the 1st Belorussian Front May 1945.
- 266th Rifle Division — established at Kaluga as a motor rifle division July 1941. Wiped out at Kiev Sep 1941. Recreated at Stalingrad Jan 1942. Fought at Kharkiv May 1942. Merged with 417th Rifle Division May 1942. Recreated at Kuibyshev Aug 1942. Fought at Stalingrad, in Ukraine, in the Lvov-Sandomir and Iasi-Kishinev operations, and at Berlin. With 5th Shock Army of the 1st Belorussian Front May 1945.
- 267th Rifle Division — established at Stary Oskol in August 1941. Wiped out at Volchov Jun 1942. Recreated at Serpukhov Sep 1942. Fought in Ukraine, Crimea, and vicinity Riga. With 51st Army of the Kurland Group (Leningrad Front) May 1945. Disbanded while stationed at Tula and Plavsk in the Moscow Military District in February–April 1946, as part of 1st Guards Rifle Corps, the divisional headquarters staff joining the arriving 75th Guards Rifle Division.
- 268th Rifle Division — established at Mozyr July 1941, fought at Leningrad and Mga. With 22nd Army of the RVGK 5.45.
- 269th Rifle Division — established at Kolomna July 1941. Fought at Moscow, Orel, Gomel, Rogachev, Białystok, and Ostrołeka. With the 3rd Army of the 1st Belorussian Front May 1945.
- 270th Rifle Division — established at Melitopol July 1941. Wiped out at Izyum May 1942. Recreated Voronezh Oct 1942. Fought at Stalingrad, Kharkiv, and Kursk; with 4th Shock Army of the Kurland Group (Leningrad Front) May 1945. Eventually became 270th Motor Rifle Division and today serves with the Russian Ground Forces in the Far East.

=== 271–280 ===
- 271st Rifle Division — established at Orel 7.41, fought at Moscow, Makhachkala, Kursk, in the Carpathians, and at Budapest. With 38th Army of the 4th Ukrainian Front in May 1945. Disbanded in the summer of 1945 with the Northern Group of Forces.
- 272nd Rifle Division — established at Tikhvin Jul 1941. Fought on Svir River and near Danzig. With 2nd Shock Army of the 2nd Belorussian Front May 1945.
- 273rd Rifle Division — established at Dnipropetrovsk 8.41 and wiped out there 9.41. Recreated at Podolsk 7.42, fought at Stalingrad and in Belorussia. With 6th Army of the 1st Ukrainian Front 5.45. Disbanded in the summer of 1945 with the Central Group of Forces.
- 274th Rifle Division — established at Zaporozhye 8.41, fought at the Puławy Bridgehead and Berlin. With 69th Army of the 1st Belorussian Front 5.45. Disbanded in the summer of 1945 with the Group of Soviet Forces in Germany.
- 275th Rifle Division — established at Novo-Moskovsk 8.41, fought at Digora, inactivated 12.42. Recreated in Far East 8.44, with 2nd Rifle Corps of the Transbaikal Front 5.45.
- 276th Rifle Division — established at Simferopol 3.41 and wiped out at Kerch 5.42. Recreated at Kutaisi 10.42, as Georgian national formation. Fought on the Terek River and in the Carpathians, and gained titles 'Temiryukskaya Red Banner.' With 38th Army of the 4th Ukrainian Front 5.45. Disbanded in the summer of 1945 with the Northern Group of Forces.
- 277th Rifle Division — established at Dimitriyev 8.41 and wiped out at Korep 9.41. Recreated at Frolov 1.42, fought at Stalingrad, Rosslavl, and Vilnius. With 5th Army of the RVGK 5.45.
- 278th Rifle Division — established at Livny 8.41 and wiped out at Bryansk 10.41. Recreated near Stalingrad 1.42, fought at Stalingrad and became the 60th Guards Rifle Division 1.43. Recreated ?, with 36th Army of the Transbaikal Front 5.45.
- 279th Rifle Division — established at Dzerzhinsk Jul 1941. Wiped out at Bryansk Oct 1941. Recreated at Balachina Aug 1942. Fought at Zaporozhye, in Ukraine, Crimea, and Kurland. With 51st Army of the Kurland Group (Leningrad Front) May 1945.
- 280th Rifle Division — established at Tula 7.41, wiped out at Bryansk 10.41, recreated at Voronezh 1.43, fought at Kursk and Korosten. With 13th Army of the 1st Ukrainian Front in May 1945.

=== 281–290 ===
- 281st Rifle Division — established in the Leningrad Military District July 1941. Fought at Kingisepp, Volkhov, and Danzig. With the 2nd Belorussian Front in May 1945. Disbanded in the summer of 1945 with the Northern Group of Forces.
- 282nd Rifle Division — established at Moscow July 1941, wiped out at Bryansk in October 1941. Recreated at Omsk 2.42, fought in Poland. With 21st Army of the 1st Ukrainian Front 5.45. Disbanded in the summer of 1945 with the Central Group of Forces.
- 283rd Rifle Division — established at Schtschigry September 1941. Fought at Gomel, Białystok, and in East Prussia. With 3rd Army of the 1st Belorussian Front May 1945.
- 284th Rifle Division — established at Romny July 1941 and wiped out at Kiev September 1941. Recreated at Tomsk March 1942, fought at Stalingrad and became the 79th Guards Rifle Division 3.43. Recreated ?, with 17th Army of the Transbaikal Front 5.45.
- 285th Rifle Division — established at Kostroma July 1941, fought at Volkhov and Kattowitz. With 21st Army of the 1st Ukrainian Front 5.45. Disbanded in the summer of 1945 with the Central Group of Forces.
- 286th Rifle Division — established at Cherepovets July 1941, fought near Leningrad and Kattowitz. With 59th Army of the 1st Ukrainian Front 5.45. Disbanded in the summer of 1945 with the Central Group of Forces.
- 287th Rifle Division — established at Yelez July 1941, wiped out at Bryansk October 1941. Recreated at Lipetsk December 1941, fought at Orel, Gomel, Zhitomir, Przemyṡl, in Silesia and the Berlin and Prague Operations. With 3rd Guards Army of the 1st Ukrainian Front 5.45. Disbanded in the summer of 1945 with the Central Group of Forces.
- 288th Rifle Division — established at Yaroslavl July 1941. Fought at Tikhvin, Tartu, and in Kurland. With 42nd Army of the Kurland Group (Leningrad Front) May 1945.
- 289th Rifle Division — established at Lubny July 1941 and wiped out at Kiev in September 1941. Recreated in October the same year and served near Leningrad. With 4th Rifle Corps of the Belorussian Military District in 5.45.
- 290th Rifle Division — established at Kaljasin Aug 1941. Fought at Bryansk, Moscow, Lenino, and Mogilev. With 3rd Army of the 1st Belorussian Front May 1945.

=== 291–300 ===
- 291st Rifle Division — established at Rybinsk 8.41, fought near Leningrad and in Poland. With 21st Army of the 1st Ukrainian Front 5.45. Disbanded in the summer of 1945 with the Central Group of Forces.
- 292nd Rifle Division — established Kransogvardeysk 7.41, fought at Volkhov and Stalingrad. Probably inactivated 11.42, recreated ?, and with 2nd Rifle Corps of the Transbaikal Front 5.45.
- 293rd Rifle Division — established at Sumy 7.41, joined 40th Army on its creation in late 1941, then fought at Kharkiv, Tula, and Stalingrad; became 66th Guards Rifle Division 1.43. Recreated ?, with Transbaikal Front 5.45.
- 294th Rifle Division — established at Lipetsk Sep 1941. Fought at Tikhvin, Korsun, and Targul Frumos. With 52nd Army of the 1st Ukrainian Front 5.45. Redesignated 24th Rifle Division (3rd formation) on July, 10th, 1945.
- 295th Rifle Division — established at Chuguyev Sep 1941. Fought at Kiev, in Caucasus Mountains, at Kherson, Nikolayev, and Berlin. With 5th Shock Army of the 1st Belorussian Front May 1945.
- 296th Rifle Division — existed by 8.41, inactivated near Stalingrad 8.42, recreated ? and with 12th Rifle Corps of the Transcaucasus Front 5.45. Georgian national formation.
- 297th Rifle Division — established at Lubny 7.41, fought at Khorol, Kirovograd, Iasi, and Budapest. With 46th Army of the 2nd Ukrainian Front 5.45.
- 298th Rifle Division — established in Moscow Military District 8.41 and wiped out at Bryansk October 1941. Recreated at Barnaul 1.42, fought at Stalingrad and became the 80th Guards Rifle Division 3.43. Recreated 7.43, with 36th Army of the Transbaikal Front 5.45.
- 299th Rifle Division — established at Belgorod 7.41 and wiped out at Bryansk 10.41. Recreated at Kovrov in 1942, fought at Stalingrad, Kharkiv, and Iasi. With 57th Army of the 3rd Ukrainian Front 5.45. Disbanded with the Southern Group of Forces in the summer of 1945.
- 300th Rifle Division — likely established in Kharkov Military District July 1941. Fought at Lake Ilmen, Kharkiv, and Stalingrad. Became 86th Guards Rifle Division Apr 1943. Recreated; with the 1st Red Banner Army of the independent coastal group in the Far East 5.45.

=== 301–310 ===
- 301st Rifle Division — established at Poltava August 1941. Wiped out at Kiev in September 1941. Recreated at Krasnoyarsk March 1942. Fought at Stalino, the Seelow Heights, and in Berlin. With 5th Shock Army of the 1st Belorussian Front May 1945.
- 302nd Mountain Rifle Division—established at Krasnodar 7.41. With the 51st Army on 1 February 1942. Fought at Feodosiya, Stalingrad, Ternopol, and Debica. With 60th Army of the 4th Ukrainian Front 5.45. Disbanded in the summer of 1945 with the Northern Group of Forces.
- 303rd Rifle Division — established at Voronezh 7.41 and wiped out at Kiev 9.41. Recreated at Typki 3.42, fought at Voronezh, Kursk, and Iasi. With 7th Guards Army of the 2nd Ukrainian Front 5.45.
- 304th Rifle Division — established at Solotnoscha 8.41, fought at Kharkiv and Stalingrad, became 67th Guards Rifle Division 1.43. Recreated from 43rd and 256th Rifle Brigades 6.43, fought at Temruk, Zhitomir, and in the Carpathians. With 60th Army of the 4th Ukrainian Front in May 1945. Disbanded in the summer of 1945 with the Northern Group of Forces.
- 305th Rifle Division — established at Dmitrov 7.41 and wiped out at Volkhov 6.42. Recreated at Voronezh 10.42, fought at Stalingrad, Kursk, and in the Carpathians. With the 38th Army of the 4th Ukrainian Front 5.45. Disbanded in the summer of 1945 with the Northern Group of Forces.
- 306th Rifle Division — established at Yuriev September 1941; with 1st Shock Army of the Kurland Group (Leningrad Front) May 1945.
- 307th Rifle Division — established at Ivanovo July 1941. Fought at Voronezh, Kursk, and in Poland. With 50th Army of the 3rd Belorussian Front May 1945.
- 308th Rifle Division — established at Omsk in May 1942 from the teaching staff of the "Omsk rifle school in the name of Frunze". Fought at Barrikady Factory in Stalingrad. Became the 120th Guards Rifle Division in Sep 1943. Recreated as a Latvian national formation as 308th Latvian Rifle Red Banner Division. With 42nd Army of the Kurland Group (Leningrad Front) May 1945.
- 309th Rifle Division — established at Kursk 7.41, wiped out at Vyazma 10.41. Recreated at Abakan in January 1942, then fought at Kharkiv, Kursk, the Kaniv Bridgehead, Stanislav, and in Poland and Germany. With 6th Army of the 1st Ukrainian Front 5.45. Disbanded in the summer of 1945 with the Central Group of Forces.
- 310th Rifle Division — established at Akmolinsk July 1941. Fought at Tikhvin, Volkhov, and Danzig. With 19th Army of the 2nd Belorussian Front May 1945. Disbanded in the summer of 1945 with the Northern Group of Forces.

=== 311–320 ===
- 311th Rifle Division — established at Kisov (Kirov oblast) July 1941, fought at Smolensk, Mga, and Volkhov. With the 61st Army of the 1st Belorussian Front 5.45. Disbanded in the summer of 1945 with the Group of Soviet Forces in Germany.
- 312th Rifle Division — established at Aktubinsk 7.41, wiped out at Maloyaroslavl 11.41. Recreated at Slavgorod 1.42, fought at Smolensk, the Puławy Bridgehead, Poznań, and Berlin. With 69th Army of the 1st Belorussian Front 5.45. Disbanded in the summer of 1945 with the Group of Soviet Forces in Germany.
- 313th Rifle Division — established in Turkestan June 1941. Fought at Leningrad and Danzig. With 19th Army of the 2nd Belorussian Front May 1945. Disbanded in the summer of 1945 with the Northern Group of Forces.
- 314th Rifle Division — established at Petropavlovsk 7.41, fought on Finnish front. With 59th Army of the 1st Ukrainian Front 5.45. Disbanded in the summer of 1945 with the Central Group of Forces.
- 315th Rifle Division — established at Barnaul 7.42, fought at Stalingrad, Melitopol, and in the Crimea. With Independent Coastal Army of the RVGK 5.45.
- 316th Rifle Division — established at Alma Ata July 1941. Became 8th Guards Rifle Division on 18 November 1941, following the actions of the panfilovtsy along the Volokolamsk Highway. Recreated at Vjasniki Jul 1942. Fought near Stalingrad; disbanded Nov 1942. Recreated at Krasnodar from 57th and 131st Rifle Brigades September 1943. Fought at Temruk. With 27th Army of the 3rd Ukrainian Front 5.45.
- 317th Rifle Division — established at Baku 8.41 and wiped out at Izyum May 1942. Recreated at Makhachkala 8.42, fought at Stalingrad, Kerch, and Uzhgorod. With 53rd Army of the 2nd Ukrainian Front 5.45.
- 318th Mountain Rifle Division—established at Rostov from the 78th Rifle Brigade 6.42, fought at Tuapse, Krasnodar, Kerch, and in the Carpathians. With 60th Army of the 4th Ukrainian Front 5.45.
- 319th Rifle Division — established at Makhachkala 8.42. Fought in Caucasus. Disbanded 2.43. Recreated 32nd and 33rd Rifle Brigades at Cholm 10.43. With 43rd Army of the 2nd Belorussian Front 5.45. Disbanded in the Northern Group of Forces during August and September 1946.
- 320th Rifle Division — established at Crimea 9.41, fought in Crimea and wiped out at Kerch 5.42. Recreated at Leninakan 9.42, fought at Stalingrad, in the Caucasus, and at Yenakiyevo. With 27th Army of the 3rd Ukrainian Front 5.45.

=== 321–330 ===
- 321st Rifle Division — established at Voronezh September 1941. Wiped out at Kerch Nov 1941. Recreated at Borzya April 1942. Fought at Stalingrad. Became 82nd Guards Rifle Division Mar 1943. Recreated from 137th Rifle Brigade Apr 1944. Fought at Danzig. With 2nd Shock Army of the 2nd Belorussian Front May 1945.
- 322nd Rifle Division — established at Gorki in July 1941, fought at the Battle of Moscow, Sukinichi, Voronezh, Kursk, Kiev, Zhitomir, and in southern Poland and Germany. Liberated Auschwitz on 27 Jan 1945. With 60th Army of the 4th Ukrainian Front May 1945. Disbanded in the summer of 1945 with the Northern Group of Forces.
- 323rd Rifle Division — established at Tambov August 1941. Fought at Mikhalov and Bryansk. With 33rd Army of the 1st Belorussian Front May 1945. Disbanded in the summer of 1945 with the Group of Soviet Forces in Germany.
- 324th Rifle Division — with 50th Army of the 3rd Belorussian Front May 1945.
- 325th Rifle Division — established at Morschansk October 1941. Fought at Battle of Moscow. Became 90th Guards Rifle Division Apr 1943. Recreated at Luknja from the 23rd and 54th Rifle Brigades, May 1943. Fought at Kursk. With 43rd Army of the 2nd Belorussian Front May 1945. Disbanded in the summer of 1945 with the Northern Group of Forces.
- 326th Rifle Division — established at Saransk August 1941. Fought at Battle of Moscow and Danzig. With 2nd Shock Army of the 2nd Belorussian Front May 1945.
- 327th Rifle Division — established at Voronezh November 1941. Fought at Battle of Moscow in December 1941. Became 64th Guards Rifle Division Jan 1943. Subsequently, recreated; with 8th Army of the Leningrad Front May 1945.
- 328th Rifle Division — established at Yaroslavl September 1941, fought at Moscow December 1941. Became 31st Guards Rifle Division March 1942; recreated Besslan July 1942. Fought near Tuapse and Krimskaya, in Belorussia and Poland, and at Berlin. With 47th Army of the 1st Belorussian Front May 1945. Disbanded in the summer of 1945 with the Group of Soviet Forces in Germany.
- 329th Rifle Division — established at Voronezh September 1941, fought at Mozhaisk January 1942. Apparently wiped out or inactivated, recreated at Lutsk April 1944. With 3rd Guards Army of the 1st Ukrainian Front May 1945. Disbanded in the summer of 1945 with the Central Group of Forces.
- 330th Rifle Division — established Tula August 1941, fought at Moscow, Kursk, and Danzig. With 49th Army of the 2nd Belorussian Front May 1945. Disbanded in the summer of 1945 with the Group of Soviet Forces in Germany.

=== 331–340 ===
- 331st Rifle Division — established at Tambov 10.41, fought at Battle of Moscow, Bryansk, Smolensk, in East Prussia and the Prague Operation. With 31st Army of the 1st Ukrainian Front 5.45. Disbanded in the summer of 1945 with the Central Group of Forces.
- 332nd Rifle Division named after Frunze—established at Ivanovo August 1941. One regiment participated on 7 November 1941 Red Square Parade. Fought in Lvov-Sandomir Operation and in Kurland. With 67th Army of the Leningrad Front) May 1945.
- 333rd Rifle Division — established at Kamychin 8.41, fought at Stalingrad and Zaporizhia. With 37th Army in Bulgaria 5.45.
- 334th Rifle Division — established at Kazan October 1941. Fought near Orel, Kursk, Vitebsk, and in Kurland. With 2nd Guards Army of the 3rd Belorussian Front May 1945.
- 335th Rifle Division — established at Stalingrad 9.41, fought near Stalingrad, inactivated 8.42. Recreated; with the 25th Army of the independent coastal group in the Far East 5.45.
- 336th Rifle Division — established at Gorki 11.41, fought at Battle of Moscow, Mozhaisk, Zhitomir, Ternopol, and Kattowitz. With 60th Army of the 4th Ukrainian Front 5.45. Disbanded in the summer of 1945 with the Northern Group of Forces.
- 337th Rifle Division — established at Astrakhan 9.41, fought in the Caucasus and Kuban, and at Korsun, Debrecen, and Budapest. With 27th Army of the 3rd Ukrainian Front 5.45.
- 338th Rifle Division — established at Penza 11.41, fought at Vyazma, Lenino, and in Belorussia. With 39th Army of the RVGK 5.45.
- 339th Rifle Division — established at Rostov August 1941. Fought at Taganrov, Rostov, Kerch, and Sevastopol. With 33rd Army of the 1st Belorussian Front May 1945. Disbanded in the summer of 1945 with the Group of Soviet Forces in Germany.
- 340th Rifle Division — established at Balaschov 9.41, fought at Battle of Moscow, Kharkiv, Korsun, and in the Carpathians. With 1st Guards Army of the 4th Ukrainian Front 5.45. Disbanded in the summer of 1945 with the Northern Group of Forces.

=== 341–350 ===
- 341st Rifle Division — established at Stalingrad 12.41, wiped out at Izyum 5.42. Recreated ?, with Belorussian Military District 5.45.
- 342nd Rifle Division — established at Saratov 11.41, fought near Orel and Bolkhov, became 121st Guards Rifle Division September 1943. On 22 November 1944 the 342nd Rifle Division (2nd formation) of 2nd Red Banner Army of the Far-Eastern Front was formed in the environs of Blagoveshchenk, Amur Oblast, on the basis of 258th independent Rifle Brigade and 259th independent Rifle Brigade. With 2nd Red Banner Army of the Far Eastern Front May 1945. Eventually became 33rd Motor Rifle Division.
- 343rd Rifle Division — established in August/September 1941, in Stavropol, fought at Kharkov and Stalingrad; became the 97th Guards Rifle Division in May 1942. For combat history see, for example: " World War II ". Soviet Encyclopaedia, 1985, p. 573 or I.A. Samchuk "Guards from Poltava " (Military Publishing, 1965). Recreated at Mogilev in Feb 1944. With 50th Army of the 3rd Belorussian Front in May 1945.
- 344th Rifle Division — established October 1941, vicinity Moscow, became (or remnants contributed to the formation of the) 58th Guards Rifle Division in Dec 1942. Later recreated and saw action at Memel in 1945. With 1st Shock Army of the Kurland Group (Leningrad Front) May 1945.
- 345th Rifle Division — established September 1941 at Makhachkala in the Caucasus. Destroyed near Sevastopol in July 1942. Recreated ?, with 2nd Red Banner Army of the Far Eastern Front 5.45.
- 346th Rifle Division — established August 1941 at Volsk. Fought at Stalingrad and in the Crimea. With 2nd Belorussian Front in May 1945. Disbanded in the summer of 1945 with the Group of Soviet Forces in Germany.
- 347th Rifle Division — established September 1941 at Krasnodar. Fought at Melitopol and in the Crimea. With 51st Army of the Kurland Group (Leningrad Front) May 1945.
- 348th Rifle Division — established October 1941 at Kubyshev. Fought at Klin, Kursk, and Białystok. With 3rd Army of the 1st Belorussian Front May 1945.
- 349th Rifle Division — established September 1941 at Astrakhan. Inactivated Oct 1942. Recreated ?, with 45th Army of the Transcaucasus Front 5.45. Georgian national formation.
- 350th Rifle Division — established at Atkarsk 8.41, fought at Orel, near Stalingrad, at Kharkiv, Zhitomir, the Baranov Bridgehead, and Berlin. With 1st Ukrainian Front 5.45.

=== 351–360 ===
- 351st Rifle Division — established at Stalingrad 9.41 and wiped out at Izyum 5.42. Recreated at Ordzhonikidze 8.42, fought at Krasny Oktybar and in Ukraine. With 1st Guards Army of the 4th Ukrainian Front 5.45. Disbanded in the summer of 1945 with the Northern Group of Forces.
- 352nd Rifle Division — established at Bugulma 8.41, fought at Moscow, Rzhev, and Grodno. With 31st Army of the 1st Ukrainian Front 5.45. Disbanded in the summer of 1945 with the Central Group of Forces.
- 353rd Rifle Division — established at Krasnodar 9.41, fought at Rostov, Tuapse, in the Kuban, at Krasnodar and Budapest. With 37th Army in Bulgaria 5.45.
- 354th Rifle Division — established at Kuibyshev October 1941. Fought near Moscow, at Kursk, in Belorussia and Poland. With 65th Army of the 2nd Belorussian Front May 1945.
- 355th Rifle Division — established Kirov 9.41, wiped out at Rzhev 7.42. Recreated in (Kirov oblast), fought in Finland 1944, with 2nd Red Banner Army of the Far Eastern Front 5.45.
- 356th Rifle Division — established at Kuibyshev 11.41, fought at Orel, Kursk, in Belorussia, and at Riga and Berlin. With 61st Army of the 1st Belorussian Front 5.45. Disbanded in the summer of 1945 with the Group of Soviet Forces in Germany.
- 357th Rifle Division — established at Sarapul October 1941. Fought at Rzhev and Velikiye Luki; with 1st Shock Army of the Kurland Group (Leningrad Front) May 1945. Became 61st Rifle Division 1955.
- 358th Rifle Division — established at Buguruslan 8.41, fought near Orel and in Finland. With 39th Army of the RVGK 5.45.
- 359th Rifle Division — established at Krasnodar 10.41, fought at Rzhev, Kalinin, Korsun, and in the Carpathians. With 6th Army of the 1st Ukrainian Front 5.45. Disbanded in the summer of 1945 with the Central Group of Forces.
- 360th Rifle Division — established at Chkalov September 1941. Fought at Nevel and in Belorussia and Kurland; with 1st Shock Army of the Kurland Group (Leningrad Front) May 1945.

=== 361–370 ===
- 361st Rifle Division — established at Ufa 10.41, fought at Torzhok, became the 21st Guards Rifle Division in March 1942. Recreated ?, with the 15th Army of the Far Eastern Front May 1945, was at Manchuria August 1945.
- 362nd Rifle Division — established at Arkhangelsk Sep 1941. Fought at Moscow and Rzhev. Became 22nd Guards Rifle Division Mar 1942. Recreated ?; with 33rd Army of the 1st Belorussian Front May 1945. Disbanded in the summer of 1945 with the Group of Soviet Forces in Germany.
- 363rd Rifle Division —12 September 1941 in the city of Kamyshlov of the Sverdlovsk region the 363rd Rifle Division under the command of Colonel K. Sviridov was formed. First, the division was sent to Tutaev in Yaroslavl Oblast to prevent possible circumvention of Moscow by German troops, and later, she participated in the battles of Moscow and Rzhev. For showing courage and fortitude, by Order of the People's Commissar of Defense on 17 March 1942 the division was awarded the honorary title of "Guards" and converted into the 22nd Guards Rifle Division. In July 1942, the division was moved to the Leningrad Front, where it was fighting in the Demianskiy bridgehead until November 1942. After reforming in camps southeast of the town Morshansk and (Tambov Region) as the 2nd Guards Mechanized Corps, the next destination is the Stalingrad area, where the unit as part of the 2nd Guards Army fought against the German (Operation Winter Storm) until February 1943. Recreated; with the 35th Army of the independent coastal group in the Far East 5.45.
- 364th Rifle Division — established at Omsk Sep 1941. Fought vicinity Leningrad and at the Puławy Bridgehead. With 3rd Shock Army of the 1st Belorussian Front May 1945.
- 365th Rifle Division — established at Sverdlovsk 10.41, fought at Moscow and wiped out at Rzhev 2.42. Recreated; with the 1st Red Banner Army of the independent coastal group in the Far East 5.45.
- 366th Rifle Division — established at Tomsk 9.41, fought in far north, became the 19th Guards Rifle Division 17.3.42. Recreated, with the 25th Army of the independent coastal group in the Far East 5.45.
- 367th Rifle Division — established at Shandansk 8.41, fought in northern Finland and Norway. With 14th Army in northern Norway 5.45.
- 368th Rifle Division — established in Siberia 9.41, served on Finnish front and in the Petsamo-Kirkenes Operation; with the Belorussian Military District 5.45.
- 369th Rifle Division — established at Kurgan Sep 1941. Fought at Kursk, in Belorussian Operation, and at Danzig. With 70th Army of the 2nd Belorussian Front May 1945. Disbanded in the summer of 1945 with the Group of Soviet Forces in Germany.
- 370th Rifle Division — established at Tomsk 9.41, fought at Demyansk, Staraya Russa, the Puławy Bridgehead, and Berlin. With 69th Army of the 1st Belorussian Front 5.45. Disbanded in the summer of 1945 with the Group of Soviet Forces in Germany.

=== 371–380 ===
- 371st Rifle Division — established at Sverdlovsk 10.41, fought at Klin, Kursk, and Vilnius. With 5th Army of the RVGK in May 1945.
- 372nd Rifle Division — established at Barnaul September 1941. Fought at Leningrad, Vyborg, and Danzig. With 2nd Shock Army of the 2nd Belorussian Front May 1945. Became 68th MRD and today is a division of the Military of Kazakhstan.
- 373rd Rifle Division — established at Cherbarkul 8.41, fought at Torzhok and Targul Frumos. With 52nd Army of the 1st Ukrainian Front in May 1945. Disbanded 1946 in the Carpathian Military District.
- 374th Rifle Division — established at Bologovo August 1941; with 1st Shock Army of the Kurland Group (Leningrad Front) May 1945. Disbanded summer 1946 in the Turkestan Military District.
- 375th Rifle Division — established at Kamyshlov 8.41, fought at Rzhev, Kursk, Korsun, and Pressburg. With 7th Guards Army of the 2nd Ukrainian Front in May 1945. Disbanded summer 1945 with the Central Group of Forces.
- 376th Rifle Division — established at Novosibirsk August 1941. Fought near Leningrad, Kursk, and Riga; with 1st Shock Army of the Kurland Group (Leningrad Front) May 1945.
- 377th Rifle Division — established at Cherbarkul in September 1941. Fought in Novgorod Luga Operation and in Kurland. With 67th Army of the Leningrad Front May 1945. Disbanded 1946 with 41st Guards Rifle Corps, 10th Guards Army, Leningrad Military District.
- 378th Rifle Division — established at Achinsk 9.41, fought in far north. Disbanded 3 March 1945.
- 379th Rifle Division — established in Ural Military District 8.41, fought at Rzhev, Klin, and Riga. At Riga 10.44. Disbanded 30.12.44.
- 380th Rifle Division — established at Slavgorod September 1941. Fought at Orel and Gydnia. With 49th Army of the 2nd Belorussian Front May 1945. Disbanded in the summer of 1945 with the Group of Soviet Forces in Germany.

=== 381–390 ===
- 381st Rifle Division — established at Zlatoust August 1941. Fought at Rzhev, Velikiye Luki, and Danzig. With 2nd Belorussian Front May 1945. Disbanded in the summer of 1945 with the Northern Group of Forces.
- 382nd Rifle Division — established at Kansk October 1941. Fought in Finland Aug 1944. With 67th Army of the Leningrad Front May 1945. Disbanded March 1946 with the 111th Rifle Corps in the Voronezh Military District.
- 383rd Rifle Division — established at Stalino September 1941. Fought at Tuapse, Nikolayev, Krimskaya, Taman, Kerch, and in East Prussia. With 33rd Army of the 1st Belorussian Front May 1945. Disbanded in the summer of 1945 with the Group of Soviet Forces in Germany.
- 384th Rifle Division — established at Omsk 8.41, fought near Archangelsk and in the Caucasus. Inactivated 12.42; recreated; with the 25th Army of the independent coastal group in the Far East 5.45. Disbanded 1946 with the 39th Rifle Corps of the 25th Army in the Primorsky Military District.
- 385th Rifle Division — established at Frunze September 1941. Fought at Battle of Moscow, Kursk, and in Poland. With 49th Army of the 2nd Belorussian Front May 1945. Disbanded in the summer of 1945 with the Group of Soviet Forces in Germany.
- 386th Rifle Division — established at Tiflis 9.41, wiped out at Sevastopol 5.42. Recreated; with the 25th Army of the independent coastal group in the Far East 5.45. Disbanded 1946 with the 88th Rifle Corps of the 25th Army in the Primorsky Military District.
- 387th Rifle Division — established at Akmolinsk 11.41, fought at Stalingrad, and in Ukraine and the Crimea. With 2nd Ukrainian Front 5.45. Disbanded with the Southern Group of Forces in the summer of 1945.
- 388th Rifle Division — established at Kutaisi 11.41, fought and destroyed at Sevastopol 5.42. Recreated ?, with 15th Army of the Far Eastern Front 5.45, and fought in the Manchurian Campaign in 1945. Disbanded 1946 in the Transbaikal-Amur Military District.
- 389th Rifle Division — established at Tashkent 8.41, fought in the Kuban, at Berdichev, on the Vistula, and in Czechoslovakia. With 3rd Guards Army of the 1st Ukrainian Front 5.45. Disbanded in the summer of 1945 with the Central Group of Forces.
- 390th Rifle Division — established at Makharadze (Georgian SSR), wiped out at Kerch 5.42. Recreated at Stalingrad 9.42, with 5th Rifle Corps of the Far Eastern Front 5.45. Disbanded late 1945 with the Transbaikal-Amur Military District.

=== 391–400 ===
- 391st Rifle Division — established at Alma Ata 9.41, fought at Riga in 1944. With 59th Army of the 1st Ukrainian Front 5.45. Disbanded in the summer of 1945 with the Central Group of Forces.
- 392nd Rifle Division — established at Gori 8.41 as Georgian national formation, fought on the Terek River. With the Transcaucasus Front 5.45. Disbanded 1946 with the 18th Army in the Transcaucasian Military District.
- 393rd Rifle Division — established at Svyatogorsk 9.41, wiped out at Izyum 5.42. Recreated; with the 25th Army of the independent coastal group in the Far East 5.45. Disbanded 1946 with the 88th Rifle Corps of the 25th Army in the Primorsky Military District.
- 394th Rifle Division — established at Tiflis 8.41, fought in the Caucasus, Ukraine, and in Romania. With 37th Army in Bulgaria 5.45. Disbanded late 1945 in the Odesa Military District with the 110th Rifle Corps of the 22nd Army.
- 395th Rifle Division — 6,000 troops establishment at Luhansk, completed its formation at Vorishilovgrad during September 1941, fought at Tuapse, in the Kuban, at Taman, Stanislav and in the Berlin Operation. With 13th Army of the 1st Ukrainian Front 5.45. Disbanded 1946 with the 13th Army's 24th Rifle Corps.
- 396th Rifle Division — established at Kussary 9.41, wiped out at Kerch 5.42. Recreated March 1945 with 2nd Red Banner Army of the Far Eastern Front 5.45. Became 77th Escort Division NKVD, guarding Japanese prisoners of war, on 5 September 1945.
- 397th Rifle Division — established at Atkarsk 1.42, fought at Kursk, Pinsk, and in Pomerania. With 61st Army of the 1st Belorussian Front 5.45. Disbanded summer of 1945 in the Group of Soviet Forces in Germany.
- 398th Rifle Division — established at Kirovobad 9.41, wiped out at Kerch 5.42.
- 399th Rifle Division — established at Chita March 1942. Fought at Stalingrad, the Battle of Kursk(with 42nd Rifle Corps of 48th Army), Berlin, and in East Prussia and Kurland. With 48th Army of the 3rd Belorussian Front May 1945.
- 400th Rifle Division — established at Yevlakh 10.41, destroyed at Kerch in May 1942 and disbanded.

=== 401–410 ===
- 401st Rifle Division — formed on 28 November 1941. First commander Colonel Alexander I. Romanenko. On 5 January 1942 renamed 135th Rifle Division. At this time it was at 70% of personnel, 48% artillery and mortars and 36% motor-transport in establishment. The artillery regiment only had two divizions (not 'divisions'; divizion is a Russian specialist military term for a battalion-sized artillery unit) with six 4-gun batteries. It took eight weeks to form. In some sources these divisions are called "lightened" (V.N. Shunkov, Red Army) and memoirs of a member of the 396th Rifle Regiment from archives of the 135th Rifle Division museum in Kolomna.
- 402nd Rifle Division — Azeri national formation. Established at Agdam 9.41, fought on the Terek River and in the Caucasus. Involved in capturing Mozdok from German forces in December 1942. However, as of 12 December, after the capture of Mozdok, only 4000 personnel, or less than half the full-time personnel, were left in the division. By decision of the Military Council of the 44th Army it was decided to use the personnel of the division to complete the formation of the 416th Rifle Division. The divisional headquarters were sent to Grozny to rebuild. Since then, the 402nd Rifle Division was in reserve of the Transcaucasian Front, effectively becoming the Azerbaijani national training division. With the Transcaucasus Front May 1945.
- 403rd Rifle Division — formed at Samarkand December 1941, became 78th Rifle Division (3rd formation) Mar 1942
- 404th Rifle Division — established at Sumgait 10.41 and wiped out at Kerch 5.42. Recreated in Transcaucasian Military District.
- 405th Rifle Division — established in Almaty, Kazakhstan January 1942; became 120th Rifle Division (II) 3.3.42.
- 406th Rifle Division — established at Kirovakan 9.41 as Georgian national formation, fought in the Caucasus. With 12th Rifle Corps of the Transcaucasus Front May 1945.
- 407th Rifle Division — established at Akhalkalaki in 1941. Soldat.ru forum information may however indicate that 407 RD was formed three times during World War II never seeing frontline service. First formation was in the Volga Military District, which was renamed as the 141 Rifle Division (II Formation); re-created in the Central Аsian MD (at Semipalatinsk) in April 1942, but without having finished formation, it is disbanded in May 1942. Third formation was at Kutaisi in the Transcaucasus MD in the summer of 1945 on the basis of 94th Rifle Brigade, but was then disbanded in February 1946. It was replaced by the 414th Rifle Division.
- 408th Rifle Division — established at Yerevan in March 1942 as an Armenian national formation, fought at Tuapse. May have become 408th Rifle Brigade 12.42.
- 409th Rifle Division — established at Stepanavan in 1941. Fought at Kirovograd, Iasi, Targul Frumos, and Bratislava. With 7th Guards Army of the 2nd Ukrainian Front May 1945. Disbanded in the summer of 1945 with the Central Group of Forces.
- 410th Rifle Division — became 2nd Rifle Division 4th formation in January 1942.

=== 411-420 ===
- 411th Rifle Division — established at Chuguyev, 9.41 and wiped out at Izyum in May 1942.
- 412th Rifle Division – established at Vologda in December 1941. Became 24th Rifle Division (II) on 1 January 1942.
- 413th Rifle Division — established at Svobodny July 1941. Fought at Tula, Kaluga, Moscow, and in Poland. With 65th Army of the 2nd Belorussian Front May 1945.
- 414th Rifle Division — first formed 15.12.41 in the Arkhangelsk region, Kotlas, it was renamed 07.01.42 as 28th Rifle Division (II Formation). Second Formation was as a Georgian national formation, established 28.02.42 in Dagestan АSSR, Buinaksk (or Makhachkala 3.42) fought at Kerch, in the Caucasus, on the Terek River, and at Novorossiysk. With Separate Coastal Army of the RVGK 5.45. By the end of the war the 414th had the name 414th Anapskaya Order of Red Banner (Motor?) Georgian Rifle Division.
- 415th Rifle Division — established at Vladivostok 7.41, fought at Moscow, Kursk, and in Ukraine and Belorussia. With 61st Army of the 1st Belorussian Front 5.45. Disbanded in the summer of 1945 with the Group of Soviet Forces in Germany.
- 416th Rifle Division — First formation formed in the Volga Military District Dec. 1941 and by late January 1942 redesignated 146th RD (II Formation). Second formation ('Taganrogskaya Red Banner, Order of Suvorov Division Azerbaijan') established at Sumgait Mar 1942, and was an Azeri national formation. Fought in Caucasus, at Taganrog, in Ukraine and the Iasi-Kishinev Operation, and at Berlin. With 5th Shock Army of the 1st Belorussian Front May 1945. Became 18th Mechanised Division 1945–6, 18th Motor Rifle in 1957, and the later the 21st Motor Rifle Division.
- 417th Rifle Division — established at Tbilisi in March 1942. Fought in Caucasus, Ukraine, Crimea, Riga, and Kurland. With 51st Army of the Kurland Group (Leningrad Front) May 1945. Became 78th Motor Rifle Division circa 1957.
- 418th Rifle Division — formed February 1942, Georgian division
- 419th Rifle Division — formed February 1942, Armenian division
- 420th Rifle Division — formed March 1942 in Spassk-Dalny, became 87th Rifle Division (II) July 1942

=== 421–440 ===
- 421st Rifle Division — established at Simferopol October 1941, fought at Sevastopol December 1941 and inactivated February 1942.
- 422nd Rifle Division — established December 1941 in the Volga Military District, and on 25 December 1941 redesignated 397th Rifle Division (II Formation). Reestablished at Bikin April 1942, fought at Stalingrad. Became 81st Guards Rifle Division March 1943.
- 423rd Rifle Division — established in the South Ural Military District (December?) 1941, and quickly redesignated 195th Rifle Division (II Formation).
- 424th Rifle Division — established in the South Ural Military District 16 December 1941, and by 9 January 1942 became the 196th Rifle Division (II Formation).
- 425th Rifle Division — established on 16 December 1941 in South Ural Military District, became 200th Rifle Division (II Formation) 14 January 1942.
- 426th Rifle Division — established on 11 December 1941 in the Moscow Military District, and renumbered as 147th Rifle Division (II Formation) on 28 January 1942.
- 427th Rifle Division — established on 2 January 1942 in the Moscow Military District, renumbered as 149th Rifle Division 27 January 1942.
- 428th Rifle Division — established on 16 December 1941 in South Ural Military District; redesignated 206th Rifle Division (II Formation) about 27 January 1942.
- 429th Rifle Division — established in the South Ural Military District about 12 December 1941; redesignated 211th Rifle Division (Second Formation) about four days later.
- 430th Rifle Division — established in Urals Military District about 16 December 1941; redesignated 152nd Rifle Division around 22 January 1942.
- 431st Rifle Division — established 11 December 41 in Volga Military District, became 58th Rifle Division ~ 25 December 1941.
- 432nd Rifle Division — established 3 January 1942 in Urals Military District, became 159th Rifle Division (Second Formation) about 27 January 1942.
- 433rd Rifle Division — established in South Ural Military District 16 December 1941, became 214th Rifle Division (Second Formation) about 25 December 1941.
- 434th Rifle Division — established in the Urals Military District 1 December 1941, became 162nd Rifle Division (Second Formation) 22 January 1942.
- 435th Rifle Division — established in the Urals Military District 22 December 1941, became 164th Rifle Division (Second Formation) 22 January 1942.
- 436th Rifle Division — established in the Urals Military District 16 December 1941, became 165th Rifle Division (Second Formation) 23 January 1942.
- 437th Rifle Division — established in the Urals Military District late 1941, became 166th Rifle Division (II) January 1942
- 438th Rifle Division — established in the Urals Military District December 1941, became 167th Rifle Division (II) January 1942
- 439th Rifle Division — established in the Urals Military District December 1941, became 170th Rifle Division (II) January 1942
- 440th Rifle Division — established in the Urals Military District December 1941, became 171st Rifle Division (II) 21 January 1942

=== 441–474 ===
- 441st Rifle Division — began forming in Bashkiria in early 1942, became 219th Rifle Division (Second Formation) soon after
- 442nd Rifle Division— began forming in Omsk? in late 1941/early 1942, became 282nd Rifle Division (Second Formation) in early 1942
- 443rd Rifle Division — began forming in Tomsk, Siberian Military District on 15 December 1941. In January 1942 it was redesignated as the 284th Rifle Division.
- 444th Rifle Division — began forming in Urals Military District in December 1941. On 23 January 1942 was redesignated as the 175th Rifle Division while still in the military district.
- 445th Rifle Division — began forming in late 1941 in Siberian Military District, became 112th Rifle Division (Second Formation) in Feb 1942
- 446th Rifle Division — became 298th Rifle Division (Second Formation) in 1942
- 447th Rifle Division — formed in Krasnoyarsk, Urals MD, became 301st Rifle Division (II) in 1942.
- 448th Rifle Division — formed in Kemerovo, Urals MD, became 303rd Rifle Division (II) in 1942
- 449th Rifle Division — began forming in Dec 1941 in Abakan, became 309th Rifle Division (2nd formation) July 1942
- 450th Rifle Division — became 312th Rifle Division (Second Formation) in 1942
- 451st Rifle Division — formed at Kansk, Urals MD, became 228th Rifle Division (II) April 1942
- 452nd Rifle Division — formed at Ishim, Urals MD Dec 1941, became 229th Rifle Division (II) 8 Jan 1942
- 453rd Rifle Division — formed at Biysk, Urals MD Dec 1941, became 232nd Rifle Division (II) 7 Jan 1942
- 454th Rifle Division — formed at Novosibirsk, became 235th Rifle Division (II) Jan 1942
- 455th Rifle Division — formed at Stalinsk Dec 1941, became 237th Rifle Division (II) Jan 1942
- 456th Rifle Division — formed at Ulan-Ude Dec 1941, became 97th Rifle Division (II) Jan 1942
- 457th Rifle Division — began forming in the Transbaikal Military District on 8 December 1941. On 13 January 1942 was redesignated as the 116th Rifle Division while still in the Transbaikal.
- 458th Rifle Division — was reformed as the 8th Rifle Division (IIIrd formation) on 23 April 1942.
- 459th Rifle Division — formed at Akmolinsk 15 Dec 1941, became 29th Rifle Division (III) on 22 Jan 1942
- 460th Rifle Division — formed at Almaty Dec 1941, became 38th Rifle Division (II) 1942
- 461st Rifle Division — formed at Tashkent and Chirchiq Dec 1941, became 69th Rifle Division (II) 7 January 1942
- 462nd Rifle Division — began forming in the Central Asian Military District in November 1941. On 1 February 1942 it was redesignated as the 102nd Rifle Division while still in the military district.
- 463rd Rifle Division — formed at Samarkand in Dec 1941, became 103rd Rifle Division (II) in Jan 1942
- 464th Rifle Division — formed at Makhachkala on 5 Dec 1941, became 91st Rifle Division (II) on 27 Jan 1942
- 465th Rifle Division — began forming in the North Caucasus Military District in December 1941. On 3 January 1942 was redesignated as the 242nd Rifle Division.
- 466th Rifle Division — became the 248th Rifle Division (II) January 1942
- 467th Rifle Division — began forming in Stalingrad, December 1941, renumbered as 266th Rifle Division (II) on 22 December 1941.
- 468th Rifle Division — began forming in the Stalingrad Military District in December 1941. On 25 December 1941 was redesignated as the 277th Rifle Division (Second Formation).
- 469th Rifle Division — began forming at Stalingrad in the North Caucasus Military District in December 1941. On 25 December 1941 it was redesignated as the 244th Rifle Division.
- 470th Rifle Division — Formed on 10 December 1941 in the North Caucasus Military District, became 73rd Rifle Division (II) 3 January 1942.
- 471st Rifle Division — Formed in December 1941 in Stalingrad MD, became 278th Rifle Division (II) 20 May 1942
- 472nd Rifle Division — Formed 14 December 1941, became 280th Rifle Division (II) 25 December 1941.
- 473rd Rifle Division — Established in Baku and Sumgait, in December 1941, renumbered as 75th Rifle Division (Second Formation) on 8 January 1942.
- 474th Rifle Division — Formed 14 December 1941, became 89th Rifle Division (II) 26 December 1941.

== Guards Rifle Divisions ==
=== 1 – 10 Guards Rifle Division ===
- 1st Guards Order of Lenin Rifle Division — 1st formation, created in Ukraine as 45th Rifle Division in 1923 from 44th Rifle Division in the name of Schors and 45th Red Banner Rifle Division. In 1924 renamed 100th Rifle Division. 18 September 1941 renamed 1st Guards Order of Lenin RD. On 22 October 1942 was used to form 1st Guards Mechanized Corps.
- 1st Guards Rifle Division — 2nd formation on 23 January 1943 by renaming 1st Guards Motor Rifle Division. Became a Motor Rifle Division (again) in 1957.
- 2nd Guards Rifle Taman Red Banner, Order of Suvorov (II) named for M.I. Kalinin Division — formed in 1940 in the Kharkiv region as 127th Rifle Division. Created as guard on 18 September 1941. Awarded Order of October Revolution in 1985. In the Russian Army as 2nd Guards Tamanskaya Motor Rifle Division). Fought at North Caucasus, Kuban, Crimea and Sevastopol (1942 and 1944), fighting near Riga and in East Prussia. With 2nd Guards Army of the 3rd Belorussian Front May 1945.
- 3rd Guards Rifle Volnovakhskaya Red Banner Order of Suvorov Division — Formed in Sverdlovsk oblast during 1940 as the 153rd Rifle Division. Renamed Guards 18 September 1941. Fought at Battle of Moscow, Stalingrad, and Kiev before fighting in Kurland. With 2nd Guards Army of the 3rd Belorussian Front May 1945.
- 4th Guards Apostolovo-Viena Red Banner Rifle Division — Created in 1940 in the region of Mogilev as 161st Rifle Division. Renamed guards on 18 September 1941, fought at Tikhvin, Stalingrad, on the Mius River, and in Hungary. With 4th Guards Army of the 3rd Ukrainian Front May 1945. Disbanded in the fall of 1946.
- 5th Guards Rifle Division (ex 107th Rifle Division 26 September 1941). Fought at Kaluga, Orel, Moscow, Bryansk, Gorodok, and in Belorussia, East Prussia, and Kurland. With 11th Guards Army of the 3rd Belorussian Front May 1945.
- 6th Guards Rifle Division (ex 120th Rifle Division 26.9.41), fought at Moscow, Orel, Tula, Kursk, Kiev, Rovno, and in Poland, Germany, and Czechoslovakia. With 13th Army of the 1st Ukrainian Front 5.45. Awarded Orders of Lenin, Red Banner and Suvorov. Honorific title 'Rivne'.
- 7th Guards Rifle Division (ex 64th Rifle Division October 1941). Fought in Belgorod-Kharkov Operation and in Kurland. With the 10th Guards Army of the Kurland Group (Leningrad Front) May 1945. Disbanded 1946.
- 8th Guards Rifle Division (ex 316th Rifle Division, renamed 18 November 1941).
- 9th Guards Rifle Division (ex 78th Rifle Division 18 November 1941). Fought at Vyazma and Krasnodar. With 6th Guards Army of the Kurland Group (Leningrad Front) May 1945. Disbanded 1946.
- 10th Guards Rifle Division (ex 52nd Rifle Division 25 December 1941). Fought near Murmansk, in the Petsamo-Kirkenes Operation, and in East Prussia. With 19th Army of the 2nd Belorussian Front May 1945.

=== 11 – 20 Guards Rifle Division ===
- 11th Guards Rifle Division (ex 18th Moscow People's Volunteer Division January 1942). Fought at Gorodok, Orsha, Kovno, in Belorussia, East Prussia and Kurland. With 11th Guards Army of the 3rd Belorussian Front May 1945. Disbanded June 1946.
- 12th Guards Rifle Division (ex 258th Rifle Division 1.42). Used to form 9th Guards Rifle Corps 4.42, second formation of division in 1942. Fought near Bolkov, on the Dnieper River, in Belorussia and Poland, and at Riga and Berlin. With 61st Army of the 1st Belorussian Front May 1945. Disbanded 1946–56.
- 13th Guards Rifle Division (ex 87th Rifle Division 19.1.42); with 5th Guards Army of the 1st Ukrainian Front 5.45.
- 14th Guards Rifle Division (ex 96th Mountain Rifle Division 24.1.42), fought at Izyum, Stalingrad, Kharkiv, Belgorod, Kryvyi Rih, Kirovograd, the Sandomir Bridgehead, Breslau, and near Prague. with 5th Guards Army of the 1st Ukrainian Front May 1945.
- 15th Guards Rifle Division (ex 136th Rifle Division 16.2.42), fought at Kharkiv, Stalngrad, Volchansk, Kursk, Kryvyi Rih, Odesa, and in Poland, the Berlin Operation, and near Prague. With 5th Guards Army of the 1st Ukrainian Front in May 1945. In late 1947 the 15th Guards Rifle Division was relocated from the Austrian city of Vladimir-Volyn and Lyuboml. In the postwar years the unit's soldiers helped civilians rebuild postwar economy, harvest, were involved in the construction of irrigation systems in the Kuban and the Crimea.
- 16th Guards Rifle Division (ex 249th Rifle Division Feb 1942). Fought at Orel, Königsberg, and in Kurland. With 11th Guards Army of the 3rd Belorussian Front May 1945.
- 17th Guards Rifle Division (ex 119th Rifle Division 3.42). Fought near Kalinin, at Gomel and Kaunas. With 39th Army of the Reserve of the Supreme High Command (RVGK) 5.45.
- 18th Guards Rifle Division (ex 133rd Rifle Division, renamed 1942) (now 18th Guards Motor Rifle Division). Fought near Orel, Danzig, and in Kurland. With 11th Guards Army of the 3rd Belorussian Front May 1945.
- 19th Guards Rifle Division (ex 366th Rifle Division 17.3.42). Fought at Leningrad, Smolensk, Kaunas, and Königsberg. With 39th Army of the RVGK in May 1945.
- 20th Guards Rifle Division (ex 174th Rifle Division 17.3.42). Fought at Stalingrad, Krivoi Rog, Odesa, Budapest, and Vienna. With 57th Army of the 3rd Ukrainian Front May 1945. After the fall of the Soviet Union became the Ukrainian 17th Guards Tank Brigade.

=== 21 – 30 Guards Rifle Division ===
- 21st Guards Rifle Division (ex 361st Rifle Division (March 1942). Fought at Velikiye Luki and Nevel. With 1st Shock Army of the Kurland Group (Leningrad Front) May 1945.
- 22nd Guards Rifle Division (ex 363rd Rifle Division September 1941). With the 10th Guards Army of the Kurland Group (Leningrad Front) May 1945.
- 23rd Guards Rifle Division (ex 88th Rifle Division March 1942). Fought in Karelia, and at Kiev, Ostrov, Schneidemühl, and Küstrin. With 3rd Shock Army of the 1st Belorussian Front May 1945.
- 24th Guards Rifle Division (ex 111th Rifle Division, 1942) (now 42nd Motor Rifle Division). Fought near Leningrad, and in Ukraine, Crimea, and Kurland. With 2nd Guards Army of the 3rd Belorussian Front May 1945.
- 25th Guards Rifle Division (formed from 2nd Guards Rifle Brigade 5.42). Fought at Kharkov, Kryvyi Rih, Targul Frumos, and Bratislava. With 7th Guards Army of the 2nd Ukrainian Front May 1945.
- 26th Guards Rifle Division (ex 93rd Rifle Division 20 April 1942). Fought at Bryansk, Orel, and in Belorussia, East Prussia, and Kurland. With 11th Guards Army of the 3rd Belorussian Front May 1945.
- 27th Guards Rifle Division (ex 3rd Guards Rifle Brigade 21 May 1942). Fought at Stalingrad, in the Don Basin, at Zaporizhia, Korsun, Odesa, the Sandomir Bridgehead, Poznań, Küstrin, and Berlin. With 8th Guards Army of the 1st Belorussian Front May 1945.
- 28th Guards Rifle Division (ex 180th Rifle Division, May 1942). Fought at Kharkiv and Iasi. With 37th Army in Bulgaria May 1945. Served with 14th Guards Army in 1980s. Now Ukrainian 28th Guards Mechanised Brigade.
- 29th Guards Rifle Division (formed from 32nd Rifle Division). Fought in Ukraine, at Riga, and in Kurland. With the 10th Guards Army of the Kurland Group (Leningrad Front) May 1945.
- 30th Guards Rifle Division (ex 238th Rifle Division May 1942). Fought at Kiev and Riga, and in Kurland. With the 10th Guards Army of the Kurland Group (Leningrad Front) May 1945.

=== 31 – 40 Guards Rifle Division ===
- 31st Guards Rifle Division (ex 328th Rifle Division 24 May 1942). Fought at Bryansk, Orel, Vitebsk, and in East Prussia. With the 11th Guards Army of the 3rd Belorussian Front May 1945.
- 32nd Guards Rifle Division (ex 2nd Airborne Corps May 1942). Fought at Krasnodar, in Kuban, and in Crimea prior to fighting in Kurland. With 2nd Guards Army of the 3rd Belorussian Front May 1945.
- 33rd Guards Rifle Division (ex 3rd Airborne Corps June 1942). Fought at Stalingrad, in the Crimea, at Sevastopol, Riga, Königsberg, and in Kurland. With 2nd Guards Army of the 3rd Belorussian Front May 1945.
- 34th Guards Rifle Division (ex 7th Airborne Corps) was formed on 5 December 1941 in the Volga Military District with the 14th, 15th, and 16th Airborne Brigades. The corps remained in the Moscow Military district training until 29 August 1942, when it was reformed and redesignated as the 34th Guards Rifle Division. Fought at Stalingrad, on the Mius River, and in Hungary. With the 4th Guards Army of the 3rd Ukrainian Front in May 1945.
- 35th Guards Rifle Division (ex 8th Airborne Corps August 1942 at Chaklovsk). Fought at Stalingrad, in the Don Basin, at Pavlograd, Kharkiv, Kryvyi Rih, Nikopol, Odesa, the Magnuszew Bridgehead, Küstrin, and Berlin. With 8th Guards Army of the 1st Belorussian Front in May 1945.
- 36th Guards Rifle Division (ex 9th Airborne Corps August 1942). Fought at Stalingrad, Kursk, Debrecen, and Vienna. With 26th Army of the 3rd Ukrainian Front in May 1945.
- 37th Guards Rifle Division (ex 1st Airborne Corps July 1942). Fought at Stalingrad, wiped out during battle for Tractor Works Oct 1942. Recreated by Dec 1942; fought at Orel, in Belorussia and East Prussia, and at Berlin. With 65th Army of the 2nd Belorussian Front May 1945.
- 38th Guards Rifle Division (ex 4th Airborne Corps July 1942). Fought at Stalingrad, Lozovaya, and Berlin. With 70th Army of the 2nd Belorussian Front May 1945.
- 39th Guards Rifle Division (ex 5th Airborne Corps August 1942). Fought at Stalingrad, Zaporizhia, Odesa, the Magnuszew Bridgehead, Poznań, Küstrin, and Berlin. With 8th Guards Army of the 1st Belorussian Front May 1945. 39th Guards MRD in 1957, disbanded 1992.
- 40th Guards Rifle Division – Formed on the basis of the 6th Airborne Corps in August 1942, fought at Stalingrad, on the Mius River, and at Odesa, Budapest, and Vienna. With 4th Guards Army of the 3rd Ukrainian Front 5.45. Eventual honours Енакиевско- Дунайская краснознаменная, ордена Суворова. Around 1955–7 became 17th Guards Motor Rifle Division in the Carpathian Military District.

=== 41 – 50 Guards Rifle Division ===
- 41st Guards Rifle Division (established on basis of the 10th Airborne Corps 6.42), fought at Stalingrad, Korsun, Kishinev, and Budapest. With 4th Guards Army of the 3rd Ukrainian Front 5.45.
- 42nd Guards Rifle Division (established with 1st Guards Rifle Brigade 7.42, fought at Stalingrad, Kursk, Kiev, Iasi, and Budapest. With 1st Guards Cavalry-Mechanized Group of the 2nd Ukrainian Front May 1945. Became 42nd Guards Tank Division 1957.
- 43rd Guards Rifle Division (ex 201st Rifle Division October 1942). Fought with Northwestern Front and in Kurland. With 42nd Army of the Kurland Group (Leningrad Front) May 1945.
- 44th Guards Rifle Division (ex 5th Rifle Division, October 1942). Fought at Stalingrad, Gomel, west of Warsaw, and Danzig. With 65th Army of the 2nd Belorussian Front May 1945.
- 45th Guards Rifle Division (ex 70th Rifle Division). Fought near Leningrad, in Estonia and Kurland. With 6th Guards Army of the Kurland Group (Leningrad Front) May 1945.
- 46th Guards Rifle Division (ex 170th Rifle Division). Fought at Velikiye Luki, 1942. With 6th Guards Army of the Kurland Group (Leningrad Front) May 1945.
- 47th Guards Rifle Division (ex 154th Rifle Division Oct 1942). Fought at Stalingrad, Smolensk, and at the Magnuszew Bridgehead. With Eighth Guards Army of the 1st Belorussian Front May 1945. Eventually became 47th Guards Tank Division in 1965 after a period as a mechanised division. Disbanded by amalgamation in the 1990s.
- 48th Guards Rifle Division (ex second formation of the 264th Rifle Division 10.42), fought at Kharkiv, Kryvyi Rih, and Gumbinnen. With 28th Army of the 1st Ukrainian Front 5.45.
- 49th Guards Rifle Division — established at Lev Tolstoi 11.42 and designated as Guards the same month. Fought at Stalingrad and Budapest. With 13th Guards Rifle Corps on 1 February 1943. With 46th Army of the 2nd Ukrainian Front 5.45.
- 50th Guards Rifle Division (ex second formation of the 124th Rifle Division 11.42), fought at Stalingrad, Zaporizhia, Nikopol, Gumbinnen, Königsberg, and near Berlin and Prague. With 28th Army of the 1st Ukrainian Front 5.45.

=== 51 – 60 Guards Rifle Division ===
- 51st Guards Rifle Division (ex 76th Rifle Division November 1942). Fought at Kursk, Kharkiv, Vitebsk, and in Kurland. With 67th Army of the Leningrad Front) May 1945. Disbanded at the end of the 1950s. Its honours and awards were taken over by the 29th Guards Rocket Division of the Strategic Rocket Forces.
- 52nd Guards Rifle Division (ex 63rd Rifle Division November 1942). Fought at Stalingrad, Kursk, vicinity Leningrad, Riga, in central Poland, at Berlin. With 3rd Shock Army of the 1st Belorussian Front May 1945.
- 53rd Guards Rifle Division (ex 130th Rifle Division December 1942). Fought on Dnieper River, at Targul Frumos, and in Kurland. With 51st Army of the Kurland Group (Leningrad Front) May 1945.
- 54th Guards Rifle Division (ex second formation of the 119th Rifle Division 16.12.42), fought at Stalingrad, Melitipol, Nikopol, Odesa, Gumbinnen, Königsberg, and near Berlin. With 28th Army of the 1st Ukrainian Front May 1945.
- 55th Guards Rifle Division (ex 30th Rifle Division 18.12.42).
- 56th Guards Rifle Division (ex 74th and 91st Brigades January 1943). Fought at Velikiye Luki, Smolensk, Shepetovka, and in Kurland. With the 10th Guards Army of the Kurland Group (Leningrad Front) May 1945.
- 57th Guards Rifle Division (ex 153rd Rifle Division (Second formation) 31 December 1942). Fought on the Don River, in Ukraine, on the Vistula River, and in the Berlin Offensive. With 8th Guards Army of the 1st Belorussian Front May 1945. Became 57th Guards Motor Rifle Division in 1957, at Naumburg, GDR, in 1980s, disbanded in 1992.
- 58th Guards Rifle Division (ex 1st Rifle Division, renamed 31 December 1942). First Soviet unit to encounter western Allied forces (the U.S. 69th Infantry Division) at Torgau, in Germany, splitting the Third Reich in two, on 25 April 1945. (Elbe Day) With 5th Guards Army of the 1st Ukrainian Front 5.45.
- 59th Guards Rifle Division (ex 197th Rifle Division 1.43). Fought at Zaporizhia, Debrecen, Budapest, and Vienna. With 46th Army of the 2nd Ukrainian Front May 1945; became 59th Guards Motor Rifle Division and part of the 14th Guards Army after the end of World War II.
- 60th Guards Rifle Division (ex second formation of the 278th Rifle Division January 1943). Fought at Pavlograd, Zaporizhia, in Ukraine, and at Berlin. With the 5th Shock Army of the 1st Belorussian Front May 1945.

=== 61 – 70 Guards Rifle Division ===
- 61st Guards Rifle Division (ex 159th Rifle Division 1.43). Fought at Zaporizhia, Kovel, and Berlin. With the 57th Army of the 3rd Ukrainian Front 5.45.
- 62nd Guards Rifle Division (ex second formation of the 127th Rifle Division 1.43), fought at Kharkov, Iasi, Budapest, and Vienna. With 4th Guards Army of the 3rd Ukrainian Front 5.45.
- 63rd Guards Rifle Division on 19 January 1943, the 136th Rifle Division was awarded "Guards" status and renumbered to become the 63 Guards Rifle Division. Fought in Estonia and Kurland. With the 6th Guards Army of the Kurland Group (Leningrad Front) May 1945.
- 64th Guards Rifle Division (ex 327th Rifle Division). Fought near Vyborg and Tallinn, and in Kurland. With 6th Guards Army of the Kurland Group (Leningrad Front) May 1945.
- 65th Guards Rifle Division (ex 75th and 78th Rifle Brigades April 1943). Fought at Riga and in Kurland. With the 10th Guards Army of the Kurland Group (Leningrad Front) May 1945.
- 66th Guards Rifle Division (ex 293rd Rifle Division 1.43), fought at Poltava, in the Carpathians, and at Budapest. With 4th Guards Army of the 3rd Ukrainian Front 5.45. One of its regiments was 145th Guards Rifle Regiment, which today is the Ukrainian Ground Forces' 300th Mechanized Regiment.
- 67th Guards Rifle Division (ex 304th Rifle Division Jan 1943). Fought at Belgorod, Kursk, Vitebsk, and in Kurland. With 67th Army of the Leningrad Front) May 1945.
- 68th Guards Rifle Division (ex 96th Rifle Division 2.43), fought at Voronezh and L'vov. With 26th Army of the 3rd Ukrainian Front 5.45.
- 69th Guards Rifle Division (ex 120th Rifle Division 2.43), fought at Voronezh, Iasi, and in Hungary. With 4th Guards Army of the 3rd Ukrainian Front May 1945. The 69th Guards RD first became the 37th Guards Rifle Brigade, and from 29 October 1953 – the 70th Guards Mechanised Division. Then became 45th Guards Tank Training Division, before being disbanded in 1960 in the Belorussian Military District.
- 70th Guards Rifle Division (ex 138th Rifle Division 6.2.43), fought at Kursk, Lvov, and Kraków. With 38th Army of the 4th Ukrainian Front 5.45.

=== 71 – 80 Guards Rifle Division ===
- 71st Guards Rifle Division (ex 23rd Rifle Division 1 March 1943). Fought at Kharkiv, Kursk, Vitebsk, Riga, Memel, and in Kurland. With 6th Guards Army of the Kurland Group (Leningrad Front) May 1945. See ru:71-я гвардейская дивизия.
- 72nd Guards Rifle Division (ex 29th Rifle Division in 1.3.43). Fought at Kursk, Targul Frumos, and Pressburg. With 7th Guards Army of the 2nd Ukrainian Front 5.45.
- 73rd Guards Rifle Division (ex second formation of the 38th Rifle Division 1.3.43). Fought at Kursk, Belgrade, and in Hungary. With 57th Army of the 3rd Ukrainian Front 5.45.
- 74th Guards Rifle Division (ex 45th Rifle Division 1 March 1943). Fought at Zaporizhia, Nikopol, and on the Vistula River. With 8th Guards Army of the 1st Belorussian Front May 1945. See ru:74-я гвардейская стрелковая дивизия.
- 75th Guards Rifle Division (ex 95th Rifle Division 1.3.43). Fought at Ponyri, Kiev, in Belorussia and Poland, and at Riga and Berlin. With 61st Army of the 1st Belorussian Front 5.45.
- 76th Guards Rifle Division (ex 157th Rifle Division 1 March 1943). Fought at Chernigov, Odesa, Brest, and Danzig. With the 70th Army of the 2nd Belorussian Front May 1945. After the war transferred to the Airborne Forces as the 76th Airborne Division.
- 77th Guards Rifle Division (ex second formation of 173rd Rifle Division 1.3.43). Fought at Orel, Chernigov, Kalinkovichi, Kovel, the Puławy Bridgehead, Küstrin, and Berlin. With 69th Army of the 1st Belorussian Front 5.45.
- 78th Guards Rifle Division (ex 204th Rifle Division 3.43), fought at Kursk, on the Dnieper River, at Zaporizhia, Iasi, Targul Frumos, and near Prague. with 5th Guards Army of the 1st Ukrainian Front 5.45.
- 79th Guards Rifle Division (ex 284th Rifle Division 1 Feb 1943). Fought at Zaporizhia, Nikopol, Odesa, the Magnuszew Bridgehead, near Küstrin, and Berlin. With 8th Guards Army of the 1st Belorussian Front May 1945. Became 20th Guards Mechanised Division by 1955, 27th Guards Tank Division 1957, 79th Guards Tank Division in 1965. With 8th Guards Army in East Germany for many years before disbandment in 1992.
- 80th Guards Rifle Division (ex second formation of 298th Rifle Division 3.43), fought at Uman, Iasi, and in Hungary. With 4th Guards Army of the 3rd Ukrainian Front 5.45.

=== 81 – 90 Guards Rifle Division ===
- 81st Guards Rifle Division (ex 422nd Rifle Division 3.43). Fought at Krasnograd, Iasi, and Pressburg. With 53rd Army of the 2nd Ukrainian Front 5.45. Later became 81st Guards Motor Rifle Division in the Far East Military District. Honorifics Красноградская краснознаменная, ордена Суворова.
- 82nd Guards Rifle Division (ex 321st Rifle Division Mar 1943). Fought at Zaporzhye, in Ukraine and the Lvov-Sandomir and Vistula-Oder Operations, and at Poznań and Müncheberg. With 8th Guards Army of the 1st Belorussian Front May 1945.
- 83rd Guards Rifle Division (ex 97th Rifle Division Apr 1943). Fought at Orel, Gorodok, Vitebsk, and in East Prussia and Kurland. With 11th Guards Army of the 3rd Belorussian Front May 1945. Disbanded in the summer of 1946 at Wehlau (Znamensk).
- 84th Guards Rifle Division (ex second establishment of the 110th Rifle Division, redesignated on 10 April 1943). Fought at Orel, Vitebsk, Memel, and in East Prussia and Kurland. With 11th Guards Army of the 3rd Belorussian Front May 1945. Disbanded 29 June 1946 at Gusev(?) or Kaliningrad.
- 85th Guards Rifle Division (ex second establishment of 118th Rifle Division April 1943). With the 10th Guards Army of the Kurland Group, Leningrad Front in May 1945.
- 86th Guards Rifle Division (ex 98th Rifle Division 4.43). Fought at Kherson, Odesa, and Budapest. With 46th Army of the 2nd Ukrainian Front 5.45.
- 87th Guards Rifle Division (ex 300th Rifle Division in April 1943). Fought in Ukraine and Crimea before fighting in Kurland. With 2nd Guards Army of the 3rd Belorussian Front May 1945.
- 88th Guards Rifle Division (ex 99th Rifle Division Apr 1943). Fought at Zaporizhia, in Ukraine, at Küstrin, and the Seelow Heights. With 8th Guards Army of the 1st Belorussian Front May 1945.
- 89th Guards Rifle Division (ex second formation of the 160th Rifle Division April 1943). Fought at Belgorod, Kharkiv, Iasi, Targul Frumos, Küstrin, and Berlin. With 5th Shock Army of the 1st Belorussian Front May 1945.
- 90th Guards Rifle Division (ex 325th Rifle Division April 1943). Fought at Kursk, Belgorod, and Vitebsk. With 2nd Belorussian Front May 1945.

=== 91 – 100 Guards Rifle Division ===
- 91st Guards Rifle Division (ex second formation of the 257th Rifle Division 18.4.43). Fought at Smolensk, Vitebsk, Königsberg, and in Manchuria. With 39th Army of the RVGK 5.45.
- 92nd Guards Rifle Division — Formed April 1943 from previous Guards Rifle Brigades. Fought at Stalingrad, Kursk, and Iasi. With 37th Army in Bulgaria May 1945. Became 34th Guards Mechanised Division postwar, 34th Guards Motor Rifle Division 1957, and 92nd Guards Motor Rifle Division 1965.
- 93rd Guards Rifle Division — established at Valuki 4.43 from 13th Guards and 92nd Rifle Brigades, fought at Kursk, Kharkiv, Budapest, and Prague. With 53rd Army of the 2nd Ukrainian Front 5.45.
- 94th Guards Rifle Division — established at Novy Oskol Apr 1943 from 14th Guards and 96th Rifle Brigades. Fought at Kursk, Belgorod, Kirovograd, Küstrin, and Berlin. With 5th Shock Army of the 1st Belorussian Front May 1945.
- 95th Guards Rifle Division (ex 226th Rifle Division 4.5.43), fought at Kursk, Belgorod, Poltava, Kremenchug, on the Dnieper River, at the Sandomir Bridgehead and Breslau, and in the Berlin and Prague Operations. with 5th Guards Army of the 1st Ukrainian Front May 1945.
- 96th Guards Rifle Division (ex second formation of the 258th Rifle Division 4.5.43), fought at Melitopol, Nikopol, in Belorussia, East Prussia, near Berlin, and in Czechoslovakia. With 28th Army of the 1st Ukrainian Front 5.45.
- 97th Guards Rifle Division (ex 343rd Rifle Division 5.43), Fought at Belgorod, Kirovograd, Poltava, in Poland, and near Prague. With 5th Guards Army of the 1st Ukrainian Front 5.45.
- 98th Guards Rifle Division (ex 13th Guards Airborne Division 1.44), fought on Svir River, and at Budapest and Vienna. With 9th Guards Army of the 3rd Ukrainian Front 5.45. Became 98th Guards Airborne Division after the war and still serving with the Airborne Troops.
- 99th Guards Rifle Division (ex 14th Guards Airborne Division 1.44), fought at the North Cape, Budapest, Vienna, and Prague. With 9th Guards Army of the 3rd Ukrainian Front 5.45. Active after war with Airborne Troops. See ru:99-я гвардейская стрелковая дивизия.
- 100th Guards Rifle Division (ex 15th Guards Airborne Division Jan 1944). Fought on Svir River, and at Budapest, Vienna, and Prague. With 9th Guards Army of the 3rd Ukrainian Front 5.45.

=== 101 – 110 Guards Rifle Division ===
- 101st Guards Rifle Division (ex 14th Rifle Division 29 October 1944). Fought in East Prussia, the Berlin Operation, and Kurland. With 2nd Shock Army of the 2nd Belorussian Front May 1945.
- 102nd Guards Rifle Division (ex 65th Rifle Division 29 December 1944). Fought near Grodno, and in East Prussia and Kurland. With 2nd Shock Army of the 2nd Belorussian Front May 1945.
- 103rd Guards Rifle Division (ex 13th Guards Airborne Division Dec 1944). Fought in Hungary and at Vienna. With 9th Guards Army of the 3rd Ukrainian Front 5.45. In accordance with a Resolution of the Council of Ministers on 3 June 1946, 103rd Guards Rifle Division was reorganised into the 103rd Guards Airborne Division of the Soviet Airborne Forces. After 1991 became part of the Armed Forces of Belarus.
- 104th Guards Rifle Division (ex 11th Guards Airborne Division December 1944). Fought in Hungary and at Vienna. With 9th Guards Army of the 3rd Ukrainian Front 5.45.
- 105th Guards Rifle Division (ex 12th Guards Airborne Division December 1944). Fought in Hungary and at Vienna. With 9th Guards Army of the 3rd Ukrainian Front 5.45.
- 106th Guards Rifle Division (ex 16th Guards Airborne Division December 1944). Fought at Belgrade, in Hungary and at Vienna. With 9th Guards Army of the 3rd Ukrainian Front 5.45.
- 107th Guards Rifle Division (formed on basis of 8th Guards Airborne Division 12.44), fought at Budapest and Vienna, and in Czechoslovakia. With 9th Guards Army of the 3rd Ukrainian Front 5.45. Redesignated 107th Guards Airborne Division on 7.6.46 at Chernigov, Chernigov Oblast. 107th Guards Airborne Division was disbanded, still at Chernigov, in 1959.
- 108th Guards Rifle Division (formed on basis of 10th Guards Rifle Brigade 7.43), fought at Budapest. With 27th Army of the 3rd Ukrainian Front 5.45.
- 109th Guards Rifle Division (ex 6th and 9th Guards Rifle Brigades 1943). Fought in Ukraine and Hungary. With 53rd Army of the 2nd Ukrainian Front 5.45.
- 110th Guards Rifle Division — established at Voronezh 7.43 from the 5th and 7th Guards Rifle Brigades, fought at Aleksandriya, Iasi, and in Czechoslovakia and Manchuria. With 53rd Army of the 2nd Ukrainian Front 5.45.

=== 111 – 120 Guards Rifle Division ===
- 111th Guards Rifle Division — (from 4th Guards Airborne Division, June 1945). Disbanded 1946.
- 112th Guards Rifle Division — (from 5th Guards Airborne Division, June 1945). Brigade 1946, upgraded to division 1953. Motor Rifle Division 1957, training division 1962. Eventually became Ukrainian 169th Training Centre.
- 113th Guards Rifle Division — (from 6th Guards Airborne Division, June 1945) Honorifics "Kremenchug-Znamianka (Znamenka) Red Banner, Order of Suvorov". Motor Rifle Division at Evpatoriya, Crimean Oblast, 17 May 1957. Assigned to the 45th Army Corps. Disbanded 1959.
- 114th Guards Rifle Division — (formed on basis of 14th Guards Airborne Division (39th Guards Airborne Corps) December 1944). Fought in Hungary, Austria, and Czechoslovakia. With the 9th Guards Army of the 3rd Ukrainian Front 5.45. Became 114th Guards Airborne Division 1946, disbanded 1956.
- 115th Guards Rifle Division — (from 7th Guards Airborne Division, June 1945) – Brigade postwar, upgraded to division a 1953. 22nd Guards Tank Division 1957. Disbanded in 1990.
- 116th Guards Rifle Division — (from 9th Guards Airborne Division) Initially formed in Kiev Military District (MD) as 1st Airborne Corps and converted to an airborne division at Liubertsy, Moscow Military District, 1942. After conversion to the 9th Guards Airborne Division (1942) the division was redesignated successively as the 116th Guards Rifle Division, 14th Guards Mechanized Division (with the 47th, 48th, and 49th Guards Mechanised Regiments), 14th Guards Motor Rifle Division and finally the 32nd Guards Tank Division. Fought at Kursk, Pokava, Kiemenchug, the battle for the Dnepr crossings, Kirovograd, the Sandomir bridgehead, and Prague. Postwar assignment to 3rd Guards Mechanised Army in the 1940s and 1950s. Withdrawn from Group of Soviet Forces, Germany (now designated Western Group of Forces) 20th Guards Army. Honorifics and Awards included Полтавская краснознаменная, орденов Суворова, Кутузова. "Poltava" (located in Kiev MD), Orders of Red Banner, Suvorov and Kutuzov.
- 117th Guards Rifle Division — (ex 8th Guards, 81st, and 107th Naval Rifle Brigades 10.43), fought at Kerch, Berdichev, Poland and in Eastern Germany. With 13th Army of the 1st Ukrainian Front 5.45.
- 118th Guards Rifle Division — (formed from 7th Rifle Division on 28.06.1945 under the provisions of NKO Order No. 0126). Brigade 1946, upgraded to a division 1950. Disbanded in 1956.
- 119th Guards Rifle Division — (ex 11th and 15th Guards Naval Rifle Brigades Oct 1943 at Cholm). With the 10th Guards Army of the Kurland Group (Leningrad Front) May 1945. Disbanded in the Baltic (Baltic or Special MDs) 1945–46.
- 120th Guards Rifle Division — (ex 308th Rifle Division Sep 1943). Originally formed as 308th Rifle Division in May 1942 in the Siberian Military District. Assigned to the 24th, 62nd, and after May 1943, to the 3rd Army. In 1942–43 fought in the Battle of Stalingrad, Orel, Briansk, and at Gomel – Rechitsa. In 1944–45 fought at Rogachev (during the Rogachev-Zhlobin Offensive operation), Białystok, Ostrołenka, in East Prussia, and at Berlin. With 3rd Army of the 1st Belorussian Front May 1945. Postwar it became the 'show' division of the Belorussian Military District. Now the Belarusian 120th Guards Mechanised Brigade.

=== 121 – 129 Guards Rifle Division ===
- 121st Guards Rifle Division — (ex 342nd Rifle Division September 1943). Fought at Gomel, Rogachev, on the San River, Kielce, and in the Berlin and Prague Operations. With 13th Army of the 1st Ukrainian Front 5.45. Disbanded 1946 in the Carpathian Military District.
- 122nd Guards Red Banner Rifle Division – (ex 249th Rifle Division 1945). Estonian national formation. Disbanded in 1946.
- 123rd Guards Rifle Division — erroneously mentioned in Poirier and Conner, but not in Feskov et al. 2013 or BSSA.
- 124th Guards Rifle Division — (from 1st Guards Airborne Division, November 1945) Reduced to brigade 1946, upgraded back to division 1953 and disbanded 1956.
- 125th Guards Rifle Division — (from 3rd Guards Airborne Division, November 1945) Honorifics "Uman Red Banner Orders of Suvorov and Kutuzov". Disbanded 1946.
- 126th Guards Rifle Division — (from 10th Guards Airborne Division, November 1945) Disbanded 1946.
- 127th Guards Rifle Division — erroneously mentioned in Poirier and Conner, but not in Feskov et al. 2013 or BSSA.
- 128th Guards Rifle Division — (ex 83rd Rifle Division Oct 1943). Fought in Caucasus, at Kerch and Sevastopol, in the Carpathians, and at Katowice. With 60th Army of the 4th Ukrainian Front 5.45. Motor Rifle Division 1956.
- 129th Guards Rifle Division — (from 176th Rifle Division Oct 1943). fought at Kerch, Zhitomir, Lvov, and at Uzhgorod. With 1st Guards Army of the 4th Ukrainian Front May 1945. Disbanded May 1946 in the Carpathian Military District.

== Motor Rifle Divisions ==
- Orders of Lenin, Order of the October Revolution Red Banner Separate Motor Rifle Division of special purpose Internal Troops, Ministry of Interior of the USSR in the name of F. 3. Dzerzhinskiy created June 1924, still active in Russian Interior Ministry in 2009.
- 1st Guards Motor Rifle Division formed 1941 – 1943, reformed in 1957.
- 2nd Guards Motor Rifle Division (ex 107th Motor Rifle Division February 1942). First formed at Kalininets Fought at Rzhev. Used to form 2nd Guards Mechanized Corps in October 1942.
- 3rd Guards Motor Rifle Division (ex 82nd Motor Rifle Division March 1942). Used to form 6th Guards Mechanized Corps in June 1943.

== People's Militia ==
=== Leningrad People's Militia Divisions ===
People's Militia divisions, listed in the order of creation, were hastily created in mid-1941 as the German advance neared Leningrad. In Russian, they were designated дивизия народного ополчения – Narodnoe Opolcheniye Division – or гвардейская дивизия народного ополчения – Guards Narodnoe Opolcheniye Division. On 23 September 1941 all the divisions of the Leningrad Narodnoe Opolcheniye Army divisions were used to form Red Army units mostly within the Leningrad Front.

- 1st (Kirov) People's Militia Division, named for the Kirovsky District (commander Kombrig V.A. Malinnikov) By 15 August, this division had joined the retreating 70th and 237th Rifle Divisions and engaged in the fighting on approaches to Novgorod. On 3 September its 3rd regiment was transferred to the command of the 291st Rifle Division, and replaced by the 76th Latvian Separate Rifle regiment on 14 September.
- 2nd (Moscow) People's Militia Division named for the Moskovsky District (commander (to July, Colonel N.S. Ugrumov)
- 3rd (Frunze) Division of People's Militia named for the Frunzensky District (Фрунзенский район) (commander (Colonel А.P. Netreba, from 16 August Z.N. Alekseyev) which from September was receiving volunteers from the Altai and Siberia.
- 1st Guards Division of People's Militia (18 July 1941) (commander Colonel I.M. Frolov) (deployed next to the 237th Rifle Division) formed in the Kuybishev District
- 2nd Guards People's Militia Division (18 July 1941) (commander Colonel Sholev, later Colonel V.A. Trubachev) formed in the Sverdlovsk District. Fought with 42nd Army. Redesignated as 85th Rifle Division in Sept 1941.
- 4th (Dzerzhinsky) Light Division of People's Militia (19 July 1941) named for the Dzerzhinsky District (commander Colonel P.I Radigin) (1st regiment detached on 22 July to the 191st Rifle Division in Narva. This was a "light" division initially formed in the Krasnogvardeysky District, with only 4,257 personnel, but almost entirely motorised, and admitting only volunteers with prior combat experience. The division was allowed a period of extended combat training.
- 3rd Guards People's Militia Division (24 July 1941) (commander Colonel V.P. Kotelnikov) which later fought with the 402nd Red Banner rifle regiment (commander Colonel Ya.S. Yermakov) of the 168th Rifle Division (commander Colonel A.L. Bondarev) formed in the Petrograd Military District. fought with the 42nd Army. Redesignated as 44th Rifle Division in Sept 1941.
- 4th Guards People's Militia Division (27 July 1941) formed in the Kalinin District was never fully formed and on 13 August transferred to Army reserve, its personnel used to complete units of other divisions. However, its three rifle regiments continued to participate in combat under command of other divisions, and the staff of the division was retained, and used to conduct induction training and formation, as well as command of replacement militia battalions.
- 5th (Kuybishevskaya) People's Militia Division (1 September 1941) (commander Colonel F.P. Utkin) formed early September 1941 from the former 4th division and on 10 September moved to Pulkovo.
- 6th Division of People's Militia – formed 1 September 1941
- 7th Division of People's Militia (commander Colonel I.S. Kuznetsov) raised on 17 September 1941 it was re-designated on 30 September as the 56th Rifle Division.

=== Moscow People's Militia Divisions ===
Although 25 Narodnoe Opolcheniye divisions were intended for formation, only 16 were formed due to demand for workers in building the fortifications for the defence of Moscow. By 7 July 1941 140,000 volunteers had been accepted into the Moscow People's Militia, and organised into 12 divisions (of establishment (shtat) 11,633) named according to the city rayons. However, on 20 September 1941 they were redesignated as regular rifle divisions (numbers in brackets):

- 1st Lenin Raion People's Militia Division (60th Rifle Division (2)) First division of Narodnoe Opolcheniye (Первая дивизия народного ополчения) in Russian.
- 2nd Stalin Raion People's Militia Division (2nd Rifle Division (2))
- 4th Kuybishev Raion People's Militia Division (110th Rifle Division (2))
- 5th Frunze Raion People's Militia Division (113th Rifle Division (2))
- 6th Dzerzhinsky rayon People's Militia Division
- 7th Bauman rayon People's Militia Division (29th Rifle Division (2))
- 8th Krasnpreensky rayon People's Militia Division (became 8th Rifle Division (2)) 9th Kirov rayon People's Militia Division (became 139th Rifle Division (2))
- 13th Rostokino rayon People's Militia Division (became 140th Rifle Division (2))
- 17th Moskvorets rayon People's Militia Division (became 17th Rifle Division (2))
- 18th Leningrad rayon People's Militia Division (became 18th Rifle Division (III Formation)) then 11th Guards Rifle Division
- 21st Kiev rayon People's Militia Division (became 173rd Rifle Division (2))

These divisions were allocated to the Mozhaisk Defence Line Front (commander General P.A. Artemyev) which consisted of the 32nd Army (General N.K. Klykov) in Vyazma, 33rd Army (Kombrig D.P. Onuprienko) in Spas-Demensk and 34th Army (General N.I. Pronin), and also included five NKVD divisions (one each in the 32nd and 34th Armies, and three in the 33rd Army).

In October 1941 four more divisions were formed

- 1st Communist People's Militia Division
- 2nd Communist People's Militia Division
- 3rd Moscow Communist Rifle Division
- 4th Communist People's Militia Division

=== Other People's Militia Divisions ===
- A Rostov-on-Don People's Militia Cavalry Division later became the 116th Cavalry Division, and later still the 12th Guards Cavalry Division. It was incorporated into a separate People's Militia rifle regiment raised at the same time. The division initially enlisted Don Cossack population of the region.
- The Stalingrad People's Militia corps included cavalry and infantry People's Militia Divisions, and a tank brigade donated and crewed by the local factory workers.
- Although 15,000 personnel joined the Sevastopol People's Militia, these were organised into a corps of four, later three brigades.
- Krasnodar Krai, Kirovsk Krai, Voronezh Krai, and Yaroslav Krai formed a People's Militia division each.

== See also ==
- List of Soviet divisions 1917–1945
- List of Soviet Army divisions 1989–1991
- List of Soviet armies
- Rifle corps (Soviet Union)
