= 414th Rifle Division =

- Active: 1941–1956
- Country: Soviet Union
- Branch: Red Army
- Type: Division
- Role: Infantry
- Engagements: Battle of the Caucasus; Kuban Bridgehead; Kerch–Eltigen Operation; Crimean Offensive
- Decorations: Order of the Red Banner
- Battle honours: Anapa

Commanders
- Notable commanders: Col. Grigory Ivanovich Sherstnev; Col. Ivan Fedorovich Ioskevich; Col. Nikolai Georgievich Selikhov; Col. Pyotr Ivanovich Metalnikov; Col. Georgy Gavrilovich Kurashvili; Maj. Gen. Valerian Sergeevich Dzabakhidze

The 414th Rifle Division was twice formed as an infantry division of the Red Army; very briefly in the winter of 1941/42, then from the spring of 1942 until after May 1945. It was officially considered a Georgian National division, having nearly all its personnel of that nationality in its second formation. After its second formation it remained in service in the Caucasus near the borders of Turkey and Iran in the 44th Army until the summer of 1942, when it was redeployed to help counter the German drive toward Grozny. As German Army Group A retreated from the Caucasus in January 1943 the division was reassigned to the 37th Army in North Caucasus Front, and during the fighting in the Taman Peninsula during the summer it served in both the 58th and 18th Armies, earning a battle honor in the process. It entered the Crimea during the Kerch–Eltigen Operation in November, and was awarded the Order of the Red Banner following the offensive that liberated that region in April and May 1944, fighting in the 11th Guards Rifle Corps of the Separate Coastal Army. After the Crimea was cleared the Coastal Army remained as a garrison and the 414th stayed there for the duration of the war. Postwar, it was relocated to Tbilisi, being renumbered as the 74th Rifle Division in 1955 and disbanded the following year.

== 1st Formation ==
The 414th Rifle Division began forming for the first time on December 15, 1941, in the area of Kotlas, in accordance with an order of the Arkhangelsk Military District. It was composed of conscripts from Arkhangelsk and Vologda Oblasts and personnel transferred from the 29th Reserve Rifle Brigade at Vologda. Colonel Grigory Ivanovich Sherstnev was assigned as commander on the day the division began forming. Sherstnev had gained considerable fame in August when he led a group of student officers from the Odessa Military School in successfully holding back an enemy attack at Pomoshchnaia Station in southern Ukraine. Having completed its formation by January 10, 1942, the 414th was renumbered as the second formation of the 28th Rifle Division late that month; Sherstnev continued in command of the latter.

== 2nd Formation ==
The 414th began forming again from February to April 18, 1942, at Makhachkala in the North Caucasus Military District. Its order of battle, based on the first wartime shtat (table of organization and equipment) for rifle divisions, was as follows:

- 1367th Rifle Regiment
- 1371st Rifle Regiment
- 1375th Rifle Regiment
- 1053rd Artillery Regiment
- 443rd Antitank Battalion
- 846th Mortar Battalion (to October 13, 1942)
- 235th Reconnaissance Company
- 347th Sapper Battalion
- 920th Signal Battalion (later 920th, 1442nd Signal Companies)
- 518th Medical/Sanitation Battalion
- 222nd Chemical Protection (Anti-gas) Company
- 568th Motor Transport Company
- 479th Field Bakery
- 580th Divisional Veterinary Hospital
- 1865th Field Postal Station
- 1184th Field Office of the State Bank

The division was again officially named as a Georgian unit and its personnel were noted in April as being 95 percent of that nationality It was first commanded by Col. Ivan Fedorovich Ioskevich who took up the post on April 18. It remained in the reserves of Transcaucasus Front until June, when it was assigned to the 44th Army in the same Front, which was on the border with Turkey, far from the fighting fronts.

== Battle of the Caucasus ==
In August, as the German Army Group A was advancing into the Caucasus region as part of Operation Blue, 44th Army was moved north and assigned to the Front's Northern Group of Forces. On August 16 1st Panzer Army began a drive on Mozdok with its XXXX Panzer Corps, aiming as well for the Terek River on the route to Grozny. 44th Army was committed to the Terek front from east of Mozdok to the Caspian Sea coast north of Makhachkala with three rifle divisions (414th, 416th and 223rd), four rifle brigades and scant armor support. Mozdok was taken from elements of the 9th Army on August 25 but reinforcements allowed that Army to hold along the south bank of the Terek. By the following day 1st Panzer Army had come to a virtual standstill. In the first days of September the Soviet defenses were reorganized and by now the 44th Army's front along the Terek ran from northwest of Grozny to Kizlyar facing the 3rd Panzer Division and elements of LII Army Corps screening the panzer army's left flank.

The LII Corps began its thrust across the Terek in the Mozdok sector at 0200 hours on September 2 as a start to a new offensive on Grozny and Ordzhonikidze, but it was not until late on 18th that the Corps' 111th Infantry Division, backed by the 3rd Panzer, managed break through the Soviet defenses at the western end of its bridgehead. The offensive was renewed on September 25 by the 13th Panzer Division but continued to move at a slow pace. On September 29, to secure the defense of the two cities and prepare to go over to the counteroffensive the STAVKA ordered a redeployment:

"The 414th and 347th Rifle Divisions, 11th Guards Rifle Corps, 84th and 131st Rifle Brigades, and 5th Guards Tank in the Nizhnye Achaluki, Psedakh and Zamanrul regions [south of Mozdok and the lower Terek River]."

The planning for the counterattack took place during October 23–25 and the 414th was intended to remain in reserve with the 11th Guards and 10th Guards Rifle Corps to reinforce success. In the event the 1st Panzer Army launched its own attack on October 25 and this planning fell into abeyance. The German offensive made steady gains but was halted on the western outskirts of Ordzhonikidze on November 5. As of November 1 the division was still being held in the reserves of the Northern Group of Forces.

=== Kuban Campaign ===
On November 9 Colonel Ioskevich handed his command of the division to Lt. Col. Ivan Pavlovich Babalashvili, but this officer in turn was replaced by Col. Nikolai Georgievich Selikhov on December 13. In January 1943 as the German forces retreated from the Caucasus the division was moved to the 37th Army on the new North Caucasus Front, but in February it was again reassigned, now to 58th Army in the same Front. On February 18 Col. Pyotr Ivanovich Metalnikov took over command from Colonel Selikhov. By this time the German 17th Army had completed its withdrawal to the "Goth's Head" position in the Kuban region. The fighting here would go on intermittently until the German forces completed their evacuation to the Crimea in October. While this was underway, on September 21 the division was awarded a battle honor:

"ANAPA"... 414th Rifle Division (Col. Kurashvili, Georgy Gavrilovich)... The troops who participated in the liberation of the Taman Peninsula, during which they captured Anapa and other settlements, by the order of the Supreme High Command of 21 September 1944, and a commendation in Moscow, are given a salute of 20 artillery salvoes from 224 guns."

The division was part of 18th Army at this time. Colonel Kurashvili had taken command from Colonel Metalnikov on June 20.

== Crimean Offensive ==
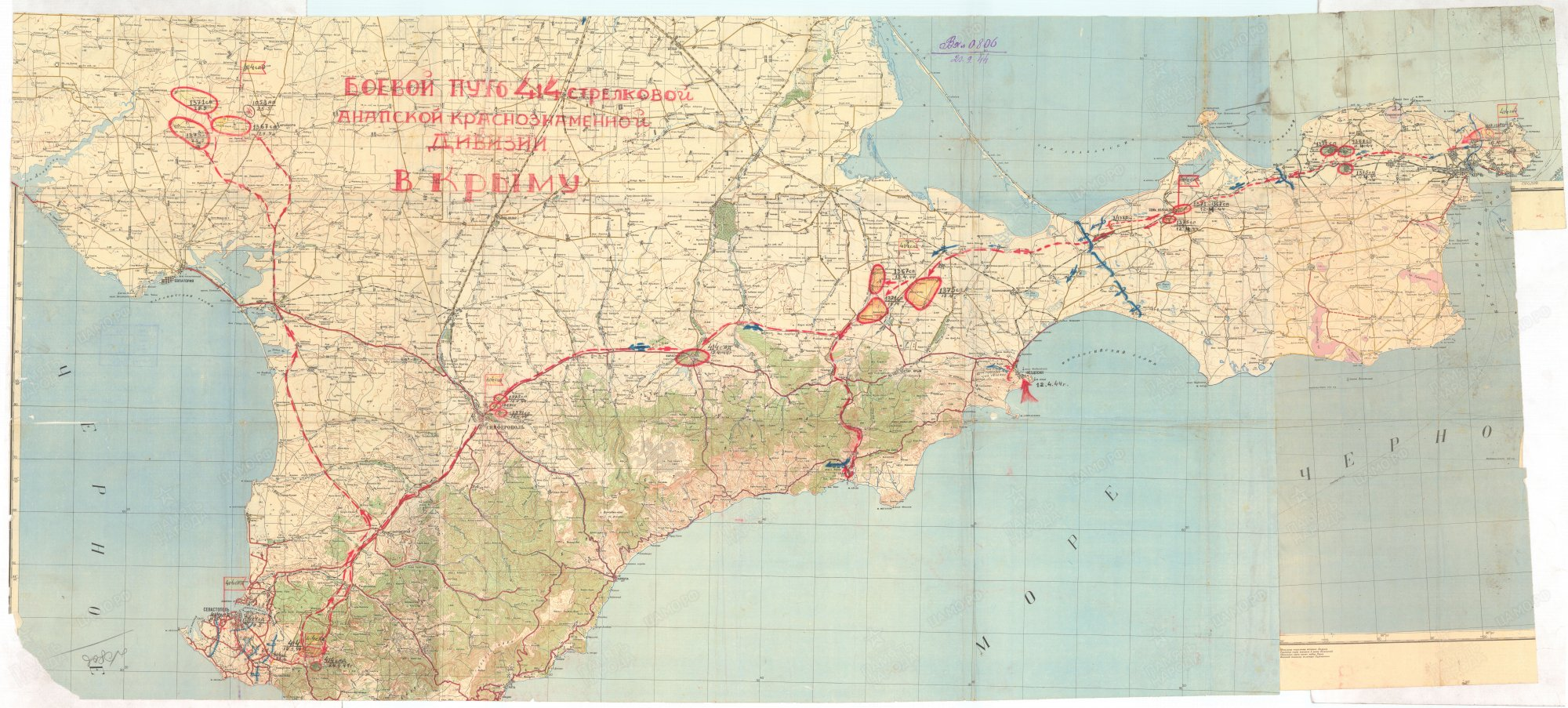
Combat path of the 414th in the Crimean Offensive

The amphibious assault across the Kerch Strait into eastern Crimea began on November 1, just days after the last German forces evacuated the Taman. Since there was relatively little shipping available the operation was run on a shoestring, and the 414th was not part of the initial landing forces. As of the beginning of December the division was in the 20th Rifle Corps of the Separate Coastal Army; it would remain in this Army for the duration of the war. Coastal Army crossed into the bridgehead gained by the 56th Army early that month, but its advance was halted just east of the town of Kerch, where it would remain until the main offensive began in April. On January 7, 1944, Col. Stepan Artemovich Beruchashvili took over the division from Colonel Kurashvili, but in a final change of command on February 22 Beruchashvili handed over to Maj. Gen. Valerian Sergeevich Dzabakhidze.

At the start of the Crimean offensive on April 8 the 414th was in 11th Guards Rifle Corps with the 2nd and 32nd Guards Rifle Divisions, the 83rd Naval Infantry Brigade and the 85th Tank Regiment. The main forces of 4th Ukrainian Front struck the German-Romanian positions on the Perekop Isthmus and across the Sivash and soon began gaining ground. On the Kerch peninsula the German V Army Corps began retreating on the night of April 9/10 with over 160 km to cover to reach relative safety around Sevastopol and with the Coastal Army hard on its heels. The German force reached positions on the Parpach Narrows on the 12th, but could not hold them and with the 2nd Guards Army heading for Simferopol in its rear the V Corps was ordered to Feodosia or Sudak from where it could be evacuated by sea; some 10,000 men were able to escape from the latter port. The German corps reached the eastern outskirts of Sevastopol on April 16, but had lost 70 percent of its artillery and heavy weapons and thousands of men in the retreat.

The Coastal Army launched a strong attack against V Corps' positions around Balaklava on April 19 but made little progress. On May 5 the 4th Ukrainian Front began its final assault. Late on May 8 Hitler finally authorized the evacuation of the remainder of 17th Army. The next morning Coastal Army continued attacking, backed by the 19th Tank Corps as the German forces abandoned Sevastopol and retreated to the Chersonese Peninsula, hoping for evacuation. On the morning of May 13 the final German/Romanian positions were overrun. On May 24 the 414th was recognized for its role in the liberation of Sevastopol with the award of the Order of the Red Banner. Following this the Coastal Army was retained in the Crimea as a garrison, and the division did not see any further fighting, remaining there in the Reserve of the Supreme High Command until the end of the war.

== Postwar ==
Stationed at Dzhankoy, the division became part of the Taurida Military District when the Separate Coastal Army headquarters was used to form the latter on July 9, 1945. It transferred to Tbilisi by September 1946, joining the 13th Rifle Corps of the reformed Transcaucasus Military District. Retaining its status as a Georgian national division for the remainder of its existence, the 414th transferred to the newly formed 22nd Rifle Corps when the 13th Corps became a mountain unit in 1949 and was renumbered as the 74th Rifle Division in 1955. The latter was disbanded in mid-1956, along with the remaining national divisions.
