= 156th Rifle Division =

156th Rifle Division (August 16, 1939 – August 10, 1942) 156th Rifle Division (May 18, 1943 – June 1946)
- Active: 1939–1946
- Country: Soviet Union
- Branch: Red Army
- Type: Infantry
- Size: Division
- Engagements: Crimean campaign Battle of the Kerch Peninsula; Case Blue; Smolensk operation Polotsk–Vitebsk Offensive; Vitebsk (Gorodok) Offensive; Operation Bagration; Baltic offensive Šiauliai offensive Operation Doppelkopf; Riga offensive (1944); Battle of Memel; Courland Pocket
- Decorations: Order of Kutuzov (2nd Formation)

Commanders
- Notable commanders: Maj. Gen. Platon Vasilevich Chernyaev; Col. Aleksandr Ivanovich Danilin; Col. Akhmet-Aln Melik-oglu Aliyev; Col. Yakov Yakovlevich Verbov; Col. Ivan Grigorevich Babak; Maj. Gen. Fyodor Ivanovich Gryzlov

The 156th Rifle Division was first formed as an infantry division of the Red Army in August 1939 in the Crimea, part of the Odessa Military District, based on the shtat (table of organization and equipment) that would become official the following month. It was still in the Crimea when the German invasion began in June 1941, as part of 9th Rifle Corps, which was subordinated to 51st Army in August. As one of two regular rifle divisions in the peninsula it was given responsibility for defending the well-fortified Isthmus of Perekop as Axis forces arrived from Ukraine in September. After several days of heavy fighting late that month against forces of the German 11th Army the 156th was forced to retreat from its positions along the Tatar Wall, falling back to the rear defense line near Ishun with the loss of most of one regiment. In late October the second stage of the offensive began, and within days 51st Army and the reinforcing Separate Coastal Army were in full retreat, during which the 156th had its commander and most of his staff taken prisoner. In November what remained was evacuated across the Kerch Strait. As the German summer offensive began into the Caucasus steppe in early July the depleted division was ordered north to defend along the Don River, but with manpower and equipment in short supply it was unable to regain its strength and it was officially disbanded on August 10.

A new 156th was formed in the Moscow Military District in May 1943, based on a pair of rifle brigades, one of which had no combat experience. As it formed it came under command of 68th Army in the Reserve of the Supreme High Command but the Army was assigned to Western Front in July, prior to the start of the summer offensive toward Smolensk. The division left Western Front in September for a brief rebuilding as it was railed north to become part of 1st Baltic Front in October. Assigned to 4th Shock Army it was involved in the battles to expand the breakthrough south of Nevel toward Haradok and eventually on Vitebsk. The complicated and frustrating fighting for the latter place continued through the winter without decisive success, and prior to the summer offensive the 156th was transferred to 43rd Army, north and west of the German-held salient. During Operation Bagration the division was initially in second echelon and took part in mopping up encircled German forces before advancing into the so-called "Baltic Gap" in Lithuania and Latvia. It won the Order of Kutuzov for its part in the fighting southeast of Riga before advancing on Memel in October and taking part in the isolation of that port. During 1945 it was back in 4th Shock Army and was part of the force containing the former Army Group North in the Courland Peninsula. It remained in service in Latvia until June 1946 when it was disbanded.

== 1st Formation ==
The 156th began forming on August 16, 1939, at Simferopol, based on a rifle regiment from the 30th Rifle Division. At the outbreak of war it was still in the Crimea, one of two rifle divisions stationed there. At this time its order of battle was as follows:

- 361st Rifle Regiment
- 417th Rifle Regiment
- 530th Rifle Regiment
- 434th Artillery Regiment
- 260th Antitank Battalion
- 174th Antiaircraft Battery (later 483rd Antiaircraft Battalion)
- 183rd Reconnaissance Battalion
- 265th Sapper Battalion
- 215th Signal Battalion
- 217th Medical/Sanitation Battalion
- 204th Chemical Defense (Anti-gas) Company
- 183rd Motor Transport Battalion
- 215th Field Bakery
- 137th Divisional Artillery Workshop
- 267th Footwear Workshop
- 450th Field Postal Station
- 238th Field Office of the State Bank

Kombrig Platon Vasilevich Chernyaev came from command of the 30th Division to take over the new division on the day it began forming. A veteran of World War I and the Russian Civil War, including service in the 1st Cavalry Army, he had briefly studied at the Frunze Academy in 1930-32 and had been acting commander of the 90th Rifle Division in 1937–38. His rank would be modernized to that of major general on June 5, 1940.

== Defense of Crimea ==
At the outset of the German invasion the 156th was part of 9th Rifle Corps, which also contained the 106th Rifle and 32nd Cavalry Divisions, for a strength of about 35,000 personnel, all under command of Lt. Gen. P. I. Batov. The Corps was tasked with defending the Crimea and preparing for amphibious operations elsewhere in the Black Sea. On August 20 the Corps was subordinated to 51st Army. Before the Axis forces arrived General Chernyaev left the division to take up duties in Separate Coastal Army and was replaced Col. Aleksandr Ivanovich Danilin on September 1. Chernyaev would be killed by artillery fire on June 22, 1942, in the Donbas. Danilin had been in command of the 85th Rifle Regiment, 29th Rifle Division, when he was arrested in July 1938 during the Great Purge. He remained under arrest until December 1939, and was reinstated in the Red Army in February 1940. Before taking command of the 156th he was serving as deputy commander of the 74th Rifle Division.

51st Army, with a strength of some 95,000, was placed under command of Col. Gen. F. I. Kuznetsov, who began preparing a defense of the Isthmus of Perekop in mid-August with most of his assigned forces, apart from 9th Corps, still en route. Roughly 30,000 civilians were drafted into building defenses alongside the Red Army troops on the Perekop and the Chonhar Peninsula. His deployment was badly affected by faulty intelligence from the STAVKA in General Staff Order No. 001033 of August 18 which stated in part:

According to information from the English military mission, the Germans are preparing sea [amphibious] operations against the Crimea in the most immediate future, while concentrating amphibious assault transports in Bulgarian and Romanian ports. The amphibious assault operation will be supported by airborne forces...

In fact, the Axis had no amphibious capability to speak of, and the German airborne force had been devastated on Crete in May, so it was odd that this information was given credence. It led Kuznetsov to deploy 40,000 troops to defend the coast against landings that were effectively impossible, while a further 25,000 were in the Crimean interior on anti-paratroop duty. Just 30,000 were left to defend the northern approaches, including Danilin's 7,000 at Perekop.

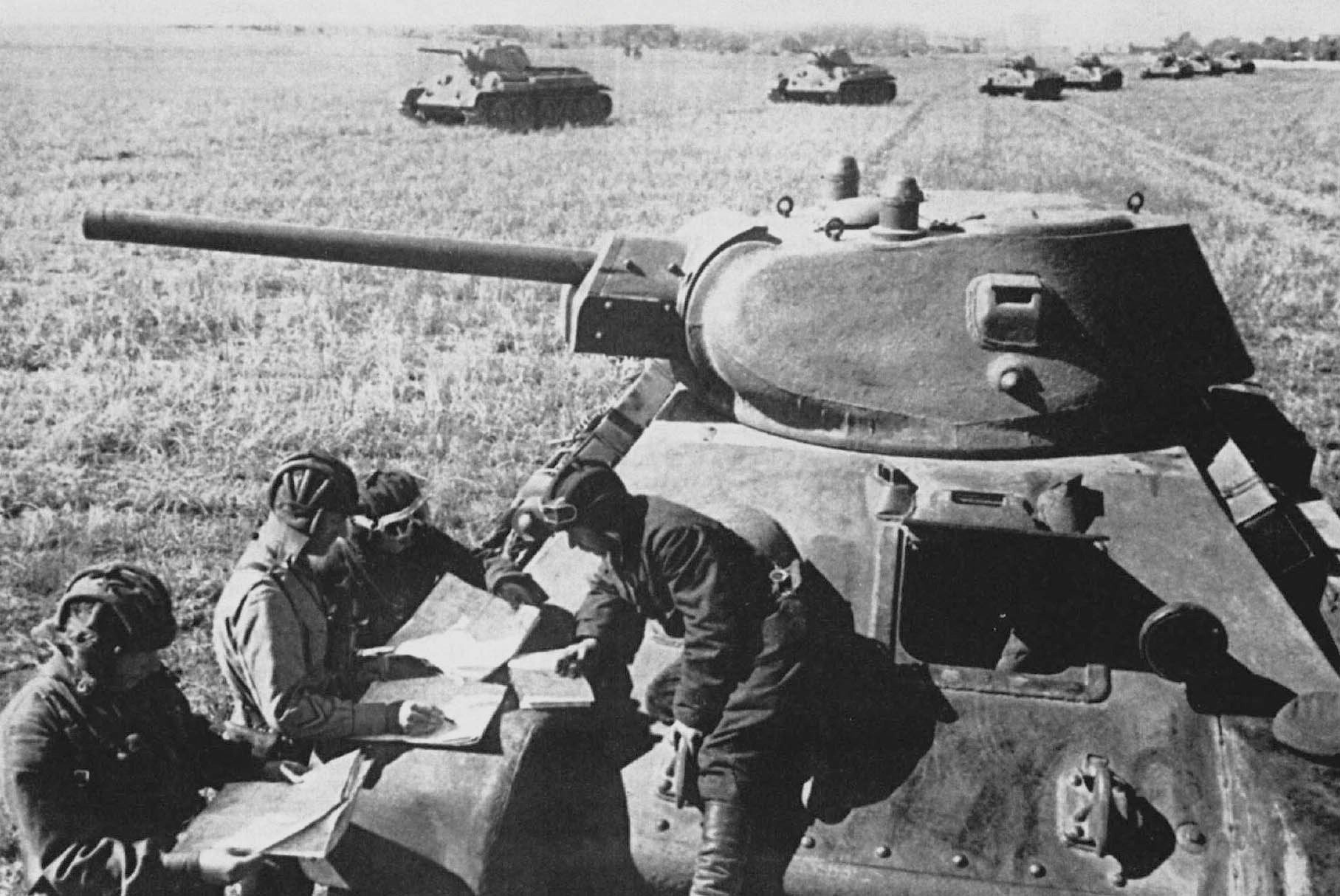
Maj. S. P. Baranov issues orders to officers of 5th Tank Regiment

The Army was not initially assigned any tanks, so Southern Front managed to scrape up ten T-34s and 56 T-37s from repair facilities to form the 5th Tank Regiment under command of Maj. S. P. Baranov, giving Kuznetsov a small mobile reserve. On August 30 the German 11th Army forced a crossing of the Dniepr River at Beryslav in the face of resistance from Southern Front's 9th Army. The attackers broke out on September 9–10, forcing a shattered 9th Army back toward Melitopol and opening the approaches to the Crimea. The 11th Army commander, Gen. E. Ritter von Schobert, directed his LIV Army Corps toward Perekop, without any clear idea of what that force would face; in fact German intelligence had not yet identified 51st Army. Schobert directed the Corps commander, Gen. E. Hansen, to form a forward detachment in an effort to take the Perekop by coup de main, just before Schobert was killed in an air crash on September 12. Gen. E. von Manstein was appointed by Hitler as his successor, but he would not arrive for five days.

On the day of Schobert's death the reconnaissance battalion of Leibstandarte SS Adolf Hitler, under command of Sturmbannführer K. Meyer, made a 35 km dash from Beryslav toward Perekop, followed by the 22nd Reconnaissance Battalion, and reached the village of Preobrazhenka, 8 km north of the ancient Tatar Wall, at around 0600 hours. Meyer's force consisted of motorcycle infantry, a few armored cars, and a battery of towed Pak 36 antitank guns, but no engineers and no other heavy weapons. As it entered the village his lead company took 76mm artillery fire from the armored train Voykovets as well as small arms fire from the 2nd Battalion of the 361st Rifle Regiment entrenched at the nearby Chervonyi Chaban Sovkhoz. Meyer could see that extensive fortifications continued to the south and as he retreated he reported back to Hansen that "coup against Perekop impossible."

=== Battle of Perekop ===
Manstein arrived at Mykolaiv on September 17 and found that Hansen had moved up his 46th and 73rd Infantry Divisions toward the Perekop but had not attempted to reduce the Soviet defenses. Furthermore, XXX Army Corps had sealed off the Chonhar Peninsula and the Arabat Spit with Leibstandarte but had also made no effort to push into the Crimea. The 156th had constructed three defensive lines across the Perekop, with the main line making use of the Tatar Wall. In the forward line two battalions of the 361st Regiment held strongpoints, each with an artillery battalion of the 434th Regiment in support. Behind this advanced position was a recently dug antitank ditch some 2m deep and four lines of tanglefoot-type barbed-wire obstacles. Within the main line of resistance concrete and timber/stone bunkers had been dug for 76mm regimental guns and 45mm antitank guns, plus several dug-in tanks. The Tatar Wall itself was fronted by the old moat, now 12m deep and 33m wide; the Wall sat on 5m-high earthen berm. The surrounding countryside was barren of trees and other vegetation, completely open to Soviet observation. Most concerning for the attackers, however, was the extensive employment of antipersonnel mines, including thousands of wooden PMDs which could not be found by conventional detectors, plus improvised devices including aerial bombs and naval mines. Remote-control buried flamethrowers were also in service. Overall, the German Army had not had to penetrate such a defence to date in the war.

Manstein was keen to avoid a frontal assault and set 11th Army's engineers to find some way to bypass these lines. One possibility was cross the shallow Syvash as had been done by the Red Army in 1920, but due to the tidal conditions and soft bottom at this time German engineers trying to wade across quickly sank to their hips. The use of Sturmbooten was also considered, but rejected. In addition, Kuznetsov was expecting this move and had ordered Danilin to deploy two battalions of the 530th Rifle Regiment on the Litovskii Peninsula where the 1920 crossing had occurred. On the Chonhar the railroad bridge had been destroyed and obstacles placed in the water below, while the Arabat was so long, narrow and exposed that it could only be crossed if unopposed.

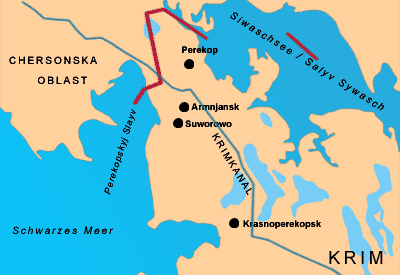
The Isthmus of Perekop. Note locations of Armiansk (Arminjansk) and Ishun (Krasnoperekopsk).

Facing the prospect of a frontal assault, Manstein took steps to add combat multipliers to his forces. Limited armor support was available from the StuG III Ausf B assault guns of Sturm Battalion 190. Heavy artillery was in short supply, mostly Czech-built pieces with very limited ammunition. LIV Corps had a total of about 152 guns, and its divisions had been brought up to full strength with infantry replacements. The artillery preparation began at 0500 hours on September 24 with over 2,500 rounds fired, as well as limited air support. At 0730 the assault groups of 46th and 73rd Infantry moved to attack the outer defenses of the 156th; each employed four or five battalions with engineers, 20mm antiaircraft guns, Panzerjägers, and StuGs in support. The 213th Infantry Regiment of 73rd Infantry struck the 2nd Battalion of the 361st, which was led by Cpt. E. K. Ivashin. The German engineers led the attack, breaching the obstacle belt and creating a bridgehead at the cost of heavy losses. Using the cover of smoke grenades two battalions closed in on the Sovkhoz strongpoint, leading to close combat with flamethrowers and demolition charges used to destroy bunkers. Gradually the 2nd Battalion was wiped out piece by piece, with the strongpoint overrun after being bombed by Ju 88s. The attack cost the German regiment 770 casualties, including four company commanders.

To the east the 1st Battalion of the 361st had held the 46th Infantry to minor gains and cost it 329 killed and wounded. Manstein had directed the 22nd Infantry Division and Leibstandarte to make diversionary actions at Chonhar and the Syvash, but Kuznetsov disregarded them. Correctly convinced that the true attack was being made at the Perekop he ordered the 106th Division to send its 442nd Rifle Regiment to replace the 156th's losses.

==== The Tatar Wall ====
The attack resumed at dawn on September 25, as the 46th and 73rd Divisions mopped up the advance battalions of the 361st Regiment, and continued to suffer heavy casualties from Soviet artillery and machine gun fire on the flat terrain. They were now nearing the main defense line at the Tatar Wall, and Danilin decided to preempt this with an attack by his reserve 530th Rifle Regiment and 5th Tank Regiment. Major Baranov decided to commit only his light tanks, holding back his T-34s, and lost eight of these light vehicles to Panzerjäger fire. The counterattack was a failure, and while German casualties for the day were 322, the 156th had now lost about a third of its infantry.

The assault on the Tatar Wall began on the morning of September 26 with a massive artillery preparation which expended most of the remaining large calibre ammunition, as well as dive bombing from Ju 87s. While the 46th and 73rd Infantry were both exhausted by two days of intense combat the 156th was also in poor shape. The main defense of the Wall fell on the 3rd Battalion of the 361st. Manstein provided reinforcements of engineers and artillery from Leibstandarte. Under cover of smoke and heavy weapons fire assault squads arrived at the ditch around 0900 hours and used boards to reach the top of the opposite side, which was covered with barbed wire. Riflemen of the 361st threw grenades from their trenches into the ditch, causing heavy casualties among the engineers; however, intense supporting fire kept their heads down and the assault troops gradually fought their way to the top. Despite spirited resistance, by 1030 the defense of the 3rd Battalion was collapsing, and soon broke completely west of Fort Perekop. German storm groups pushed through the gap, overran mortar and antitank positions, and reached as far as Armiansk where they began house-to-house fighting with remnants of the 156th which were dug in at a brick factory.

By 1100 hours the two German divisions were over the Wall in strength. Kuznetsov now committed Group Batov of three rifle regiments to counterattack, and despite a lack of artillery support, forced the 46th Infantry back to the Wall, while the 73rd was forced out of Armiansk. At this point General Hansen replied with a battlegroup of 50th Infantry Division, recently arrived from Odesa. Along with timely air support this tipped the fighting in German favor. By dusk all of Armiansk was back in their hands, and while the eastern part of the Wall was still held by elements of the 156th, Kuznetsov had no further reserves and little to prevent Hansen from advancing on the reserve line at Ishun.

The STAVKA had expected Kuznetsov to hold the Tatar Wall far longer, if not indefinitely, and ordered him to continue counterattacking. Group Batov retook most of Armiansk early on September 27, forcing the 73rd Infantry back to the brick factory where it held on the rest of the day. Meanwhile, German engineers, under costly artillery fire, were building a 16-tonne wooden bridge over the western part of the Tatar Ditch, allowing several StuGs to cross. These, in support of 50th Infantry and with Ju 87s overhead, retook most of Armiansk. Batov made a further effort at dawn the next day with Baranov's T-34s, some of which reached the Wall, while the riflemen again occupied the town. But Group Batov had now shot its bolt and late in the evening Armiansk changed hands yet again. Kuznetsov now pleaded for permission to pull back to Ishun, and while the STAVKA had grave, and justified, doubts about his leadership abilities it authorized the withdrawal, which was covered by Baranov's tankers over the next few days, with only one vehicle lost. While LIV Corps had taken considerable casualties, especially among its junior officers, and had a good deal of equipment destroyed, it claimed 10,019 prisoners taken, along with 32 tanks and 68 artillery pieces. As most of these were from the 156th, the division had been largely destroyed in the fighting.

==== Battle of Ishun ====
51st Army now gained a reprieve as Manstein was forced to react to a crisis west of Melitopol. The STAVKA was also forced to react to the situation in the Crimea by abandoning Odesa, which it had been successfully holding. Kuznetsov soon received the 157th Rifle Division at Sevastopol, and by mid-October the Separate Coastal Army had been delivered by the Black Sea Fleet almost intact. Kuznetsov would need these forces to hold at Ishun; his Army still had some 50,000 personnel, but after deducting forces covering Chonhar and the Syvash only 15,000-20,000 were available, many being militiamen of 1st and 2nd Crimean Divisions. German reconnaissance was learning that the position at Ishun was nearly as formidable as that at the Perekop. The small town had three large salt lakes and the Black Sea on its flanks, leaving just three potential routes to the south, the widest of which, along the rail line, spanned just 1,300m. The landscape was equally barren and flat, as well as being marshy. This sector was assigned to what remained of the 361st Regiment, a battalion of 172nd Rifle Division, and a pair of naval infantry battalions. The remainder of the 156th was positioned between Lake Staroe and Lake Krasnoe, anchored on a strongpoint built in and around a bromide factory. The 106th and 271st Rifle Divisions held between Lake Krasnoe and the Syvash, as Kuznetsov continued to fear a crossing operation on this flank. Baranov still had nine T-34s operational, but artillery support was much reduced, consisting mostly of older 76mm guns. The Voykovets would soon be joined by the Smyert fashizmu armored train.

11th Army was now tasked exclusively with the conquest of the Crimea, but was also reduced to just six divisions. Since maneuver was impossible, Manstein chose to mislead Kuznetsov by attacking on all three axes, beginning in the east with 22nd Infantry before shifting to the west with the 73rd; the 46th would conduct holding attacks in the center. Artillery was still in short supply, so air support would be more essential than before. The preparation began at 0600 hours on October 18 and lasted two hours. On the east flank two battalions of the 22nd waded through 460m of shallow water and took the 106th's 442nd Regiment by surprise, tearing apart Kuznetsov's right flank. However, the 397th Rifle Regiment, dug in on the Tumulus Assis burial mound, stopped two further battalions cold, with heavy losses, when they attempted a frontal attack over open ground. In the center the 156th's 417th Rifle Regiment lost some ground to the 46th Infantry in an indecisive battle, while the 73rd Infantry also made only modest gains on the left. Soviet artillery provided effective support, as did the armored trains.

The next day fortunes turned in German favor. A renewed attack on Tumulus Assis with StuG support gained a surprising success, and the 106th and 271st Divisions fell back to reserve positions. The 73rd Infantry won a greater success on the west flank when the German heavy guns managed to destroy the obstacles in front of the 361st Regiment. Two battalions attacked through this breach, backed by another battery of StuGs. The artillery suppressed the fire of the riflemen and they were quickly overrun, which led to the loss of the fortified village of Krasnoperekopsk and the isolation of the two naval infantry battalions and one battalion of the 172nd against the Black Sea coast. The resistance of the 156th, as well as 51st Army as a whole, began to collapse; 5th Tank Regiment in reserve in Ishun were suddenly under attack by Panzerjägers and lost two T-34s immobilized and captured before retreating to the south. Once they crossed the Chatyrlyk River the German infantry had advanced 8 km through the heart of the 51st Army's defense, losing only 150 casualties in the process.

Kuznetsov's force was effectively broken by evening, but the 157th Division was marching up from Sevastopol. On the morning of October 20 two of its regiments attacked Ishun with artillery support and Baranov's remaining T-34s. The 73rd Infantry was forced out of the town, but this brought the 157th out into the open where it was struck with artillery and air attacks, bringing it to a halt before the 73rd counterattacked and retook Ishun. Heavy rain ended the fighting and the two sides exchanged attacks over the next day with little result. Kuznetsov was relieved of command on October 22; oddly enough the STAVKA now placed Vice-Adm. G. I. Levchenko in charge of all land, air and naval forces in the Crimea. Levchenko sent in a large scale counterattack on the morning of October 24, using the evacuated units from Odesa and the remnants of 51st Army, now under Batov. While the 73rd was short on riflemen it still had plenty of machine guns and mortars, which caused heavy casualties to the attackers, and the effort failed. A further attack was mounted the next day but the losses were too great. Hansen sensed a weakness and committed the fresh 170th Infantry Division south of Ishun and the Soviet defense began to collapse. On October 26 Manstein reinforced success with the 132nd Infantry Division and by the end of the day most of 51st Army was retreating in disorder, although some units continued to hold on to strongpoints. 11th Army had won the battles for the Perekop, at the cost of over 12,000 casualties, but 51st and Coastal Armies had lost some 25 percent, including 16,000 prisoners taken at Ishun. The 51st had also lost roughly 200 artillery pieces.

Batov led his defeated Army toward Dzhankoi, hoping to link up with the 276th Rifle Division which had been guarding the south side of the Chonhar. Efforts to establish rearguards were mostly knocked aside before they could dig in, leading to more men being captured. 46th Infantry burst into Dzhankoi before a defense was organized and the retreat became a rout. South of the city Colonel Danilin with most of his staff were scooped up by a patrol of the 170th Infantry at 1100 hours on October 30. Danilin was interrogated by an intelligence officer of LIV Corps and apparently gave up information on the direction of the retreat and the command and control difficulties in the Soviet command structure. Subsequently, he and his staff disappeared into German captivity, and his fate is unknown. Officially he remained in command until November 26 when he was replaced by Col. Akhmet-Aln Melik-oglu Aliyev. This Azeri officer had been in command of the 2nd Crimean/321st Rifle Division. By this time the 156th, with a remaining strength of 2,733 personnel, had retreated to Kerch and been evacuated to the Taman Peninsula, where 51st Army came under command of Transcaucasus Front.

=== Battle of the Kerch Peninsula ===
At the start of 1942 the division was under direct command of the renamed Caucasus Front, as it struggled to rebuild; one rifle regiment (likely the 361st) was reformed from personnel of the 276th Division when it was temporarily disbanded. Meanwhile, in December the STAVKA had begun planning an operation to recross the Kerch Strait and land forces that would take back the Crimea while also reestablishing land communications with Separate Coastal Army, holed up in Sevastopol. This proved to be a surprising success, particularly the coup-de-main at Feodosia by 44th Army on December 29. By New Year's Day Caucasus Front's (soon renamed Crimean Front) 44th and 51st Armies had complete control of the Kerch Peninsula, although efforts to advance on Sevastopol were beaten back. As of April 1 the 156th was still under Front command in Taman, but during the month it was shipped back to the Crimea to form part of the Front reserves near Kerch.

In April, Manstein began planning a new operation to retake the Peninsula, to be called Trappenjagd ("Bustard Hunt"). This began on the morning of May 8 with an initial strike against the rebuilt 276th and the 63rd Mountain Rifle Division of 44th Army at the south end of the defense line at the Parpach Narrows. The two divisions were heavily hit by artillery fire and air attacks and were shattered within hours. By late on May 9 Manstein was able to commit the 200 tanks of 22nd Panzer Division and at noon the next day the entire 51st Army was cut off and trapped against the coast of the Sea of Azov. Soviet command and control broke down in another rout, now toward Kerch. As part of the Front reserve the 156th attempted to provide rearguards, but these were bypassed and on May 13 German forces were across the so-called "Turkish Rampart" in strength. Colonel Aliyev decided to withdraw, given the circumstances, and led the 361st Regiment in a rearguard action but was seriously wounded that evening near the village of Churubash Tatarsky and left on the field. He would live undercover for the next year and a half, eventually joining the partisans, but was arrested in December 1943 and soon sent to Germany where he was liberated in May 1945. He was reinstated to the Red Army after a counterintelligence check but died at Baku in 1953. He was replaced in command of the 156th on May 17 by Col. Yakov Yakovlevich Verbov. This officer had led the just-disbanded 400th Rifle Division through its brief career. The 156th had again been evacuated over the Kerch Strait, but with significant losses along with the rest of its Front.

== Case Blue ==
At the start of June the division was again rebuilding in 44th Army of North Caucasus Front. Later in the month it rejoined 51st Army in the same Front. As the German summer offensive developed on July 12 the STAVKA took the precaution of ordering the Front to concentrate three divisions from that Army (156th, 157th, and 91st), each with a regiment of Guards mortars in support, to form a covering force on the south bank of the Don River east of Rostov-na-Donu. At the same time it ordered the 64th Army to take up positions between Surovikino on the Chir River and Verkhnekurmoiarskaya on the Don. The next day Hitler redirected the 4th Panzer Army to take crossings over the Don from 120 km - 210 km east of Rostov. As of July 25 the 156th was still part of the force defending the 171 km-long sector opposite the XXXXVIII Panzer Corps, but by the beginning of August it had disappeared from the Red Army's order of battle, although it was not officially disbanded until August 10. Colonel Verbov went on to command four other rifle divisions before the end of the war and was promoted to the rank of major general on April 20, 1945.

== 2nd Formation ==
A new 156th Rifle Division began forming on May 18 near Kalinin in the Moscow Military District, based on the 26th Rifle Brigade and 163rd Rifle Brigade.

=== 26th Rifle Brigade ===
This unit had begun forming in the Moscow Military District in October 1941. Given its number it was likely a "student" brigade formed from a number of the many training and reserve units in the District. It was transferred to Western Front in early December and was soon assigned to 49th Army as it was advancing west from Serpukhov during the Moscow counteroffensive. This advance stalled in January 1942, so the brigade was moved north and reassigned to Kalinin Front where it joined the 2nd Guards Rifle Corps. (Guards rifle corps at this time generally comprised one Guards rifle division and several regular rifle brigades.) This Corps was in the Front reserves, and fought around Rzhev for the rest of the winter. In June the Corps was assigned to 3rd Shock Army at Velikiye Luki and spent the summer and fall on this relatively static front. When 3rd Shock began its offensive to take the city in late November the 26th Brigade served directly under Army command. Following this success the forces of the Front began reorganizing in the spring of 1943 for the upcoming summer offensive and the brigade was sent to the rear.

=== 163rd Rifle Brigade ===
A brigade of this number may have existed briefly in the Transcaucasus in the fall of 1942 as part of 47th Army, but this is only mentioned in one Soviet source. A much better documented 163rd began forming in January 1943 in the Volga Military District, but by now rifle brigades were no longer considered effective for front line service. Instead it was moved north in May where it was split up to provide resources for a number of reforming divisions, including the 156th.

Once formed the division's order of battle was very similar to that of its 1st formation:

- 361st Rifle Regiment
- 417th Rifle Regiment
- 530th Rifle Regiment
- 434th Artillery Regiment
- 260th Antitank Battalion
- 183rd Reconnaissance Company
- 265th Sapper Battalion
- 215th Signal Battalion (later 145th Signal Company)
- 217th Medical/Sanitation Battalion
- 204th Chemical Defense (Anti-gas) Platoon
- 183rd Motor Transport Company
- 274th Field Bakery
- 272nd Divisional Veterinary Hospital
- 1639th Field Postal Station
- 1629th Field Office of the State Bank

Col. Ivan Grigorevich Babak was appointed to command on the day the division began forming. His deputy commander was Col. Dmitrii Romanovich Nabatov, who had been in command of the 163rd Brigade. The division immediately came under command of Lt. Gen. E. P. Zhuravlev's 68th Army, and on July 12 this Army became part of the active forces when it joined Western Front. The 156th was under direct Army command.

== Battle of Smolensk ==
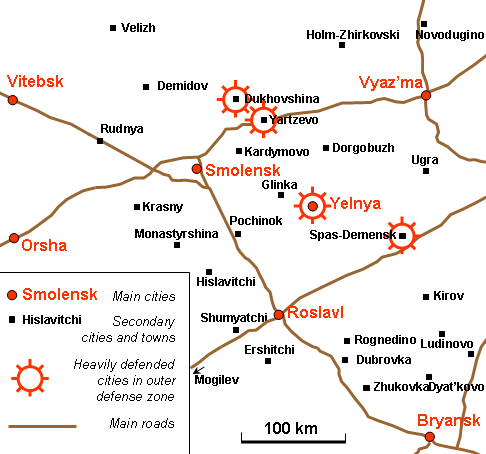
General layout of the Smolensk region during the offensive

Operation Suvorov began on August 7 with a preliminary bombardment at 0440 hours and a ground assault at 0630. The commander of Western Front, Col. Gen. V. D. Sokolovskii, committed his 5th, 10th Guards, and 33rd Armies in the initial assault, while 68th Army was in second echelon. The attack quickly encountered heavy opposition and stalled. By early afternoon, Sokolovskii became concerned about the inability of most of his units to advance and decided to commit 68th Army's 81st Rifle Corps to reinforce the push by 10th Guards Army against XII Army Corps. This was a premature and foolish decision on a number of levels, crowding an already stalled front with even more troops and vehicles.

On the morning of August 8, Sokolovskii resumed his offensive at 0730 hours, but now he had three armies tangled up on the main axis of advance. After a 30-minute artillery preparation the Soviets resumed their attacks across a 10 km-wide front. 81st Corps was inserted between the two engaged corps of 10th Guards, putting further pressure on the 268th Infantry Division. Reinforcements from 2nd Panzer Division were coming up from Yelnya in support. By August 11 it became clear that XII Corps was running out of infantry and so late in the day the German forces began falling back toward the Yelnya–Spas-Demensk railway. By now Western Front had expended nearly all its artillery ammunition and was not able to immediately exploit the withdrawal. Sokolovskii was authorized to temporarily suspend Suvorov on August 21.

=== Yelnya Offensive ===
Sokolovskii was given just one week to reorganize for the next push. In the new plan the 10th Guards, 21st, 33rd and 68th Armies would make the main effort, attacking XII Corps all along its front until it shattered, then push mobile groups through the gaps to seize Yelnya. It kicked off on August 28 with a 90-minute artillery preparation across a 25 km-wide front, but did not initially include 68th Army. A gap soon appeared in the German front in 33rd Army's sector, and the 5th Mechanized Corps was committed. On the second day this Corps achieved a breakthrough and Yelnya was liberated on August 30. By this time the attacking rifle divisions were reduced to 3,000 men or fewer. By September 1 the 156th had been reassigned to 72nd Rifle Corps, still in 68th Army, but on September 12, before the next phase of the offensive began, it was withdrawn to the Reserve of the Supreme High Command, and sent north. It rejoined the fighting front on October 9, now as part of 60th Rifle Corps of 4th Shock Army in what would soon be 1st Baltic Front.

== Battles for Vitebsk ==
60th Corps had been recently created by the Front commander, Army Gen. A. I. Yeryomenko, as a reserve force containing the 119th, 154th, and 156th Divisions. He had been tasked with advancing on Vitebsk from the northeast, alongside a supporting operation toward Nevel, with the 60th Corps available to exploit success in either direction. The attack on Nevel by 3rd and 4th Shock Armies began early on the morning of October 6 and immediately achieved a success which was surprising to both sides, with the town itself falling to a coup de main by nightfall after an advance of some 25 km.

=== Polotsk–Vitebsk Offensive ===
The Nevel offensive faltered in the face of enemy reserves and by October 10 halted just short of the Nevel–Haradok–Vitebsk railroad and highway, although local fighting continued until October 18. On November 2 a new offensive began in the direction of Vitebsk and Polotsk:

In an early morning fog on 2 November the Third and Fourth Shock Armies penetrated the Third Panzer Army left flank southwest of Nevel. They had paved the way during the five previous days with heavy attacks that drove a deep dent in the Third Panzer Army line. After the breakthrough, which opened a 10-mile-wide [16km] gap, Third Shock Army turned north behind Sixteenth Army's flank, and Fourth Shock Army turned southwest behind Third Panzer Army.
Army Group Center shifted a panzer division north from Ninth Army. With that division it was able to strengthen the Third Panzer Army flank below the breakthrough and deflect Fourth Shock Army southwestward away from the panzer army's rear.

4th Shock was led by 60th Corps (now with the 357th Rifle Division also under command) backed by the 143rd Tank Brigade. It struck the 87th Infantry Division and what remained of 2nd Luftwaffe Field Division (IX Army Corps) on a 10 km-wide frontage 16 km south of Nevel. 83rd Rifle Corps covered the 60th's left flank and Lt. Gen. A. P. Beloborodov's 2nd Guards Rifle Corps formed the Army's second echelon. After 60th Corps had penetrated the defenses some 10 km deep the 2nd Guards Corps was committed on November 6, with the 156th and 154th Divisions being transferred to that command. Beloborodov wrote in his memoirs:

On November 6, the headquarters and the corps administration were relocated to the mouth of the salient. At this time the corps included four rifle divisions — the 47th, 154th, 156th, and 381st — and the 236th Tank Brigade... The mission was to expand the gap to the south. The 154th and 156th divisions were already advancing along the Nevel road on Ezerishche, Bychikha and Gorodok, and the 381st and 47th divisions... were to attack these towns from the west, from within the salient, and cooperate with other units of the 4th Shock Army, advancing from the east, to encircle the enemy.

In addition the Front's 43rd and 39th Armies were also attacking Vitebsk from the east, along the road from Smolensk.

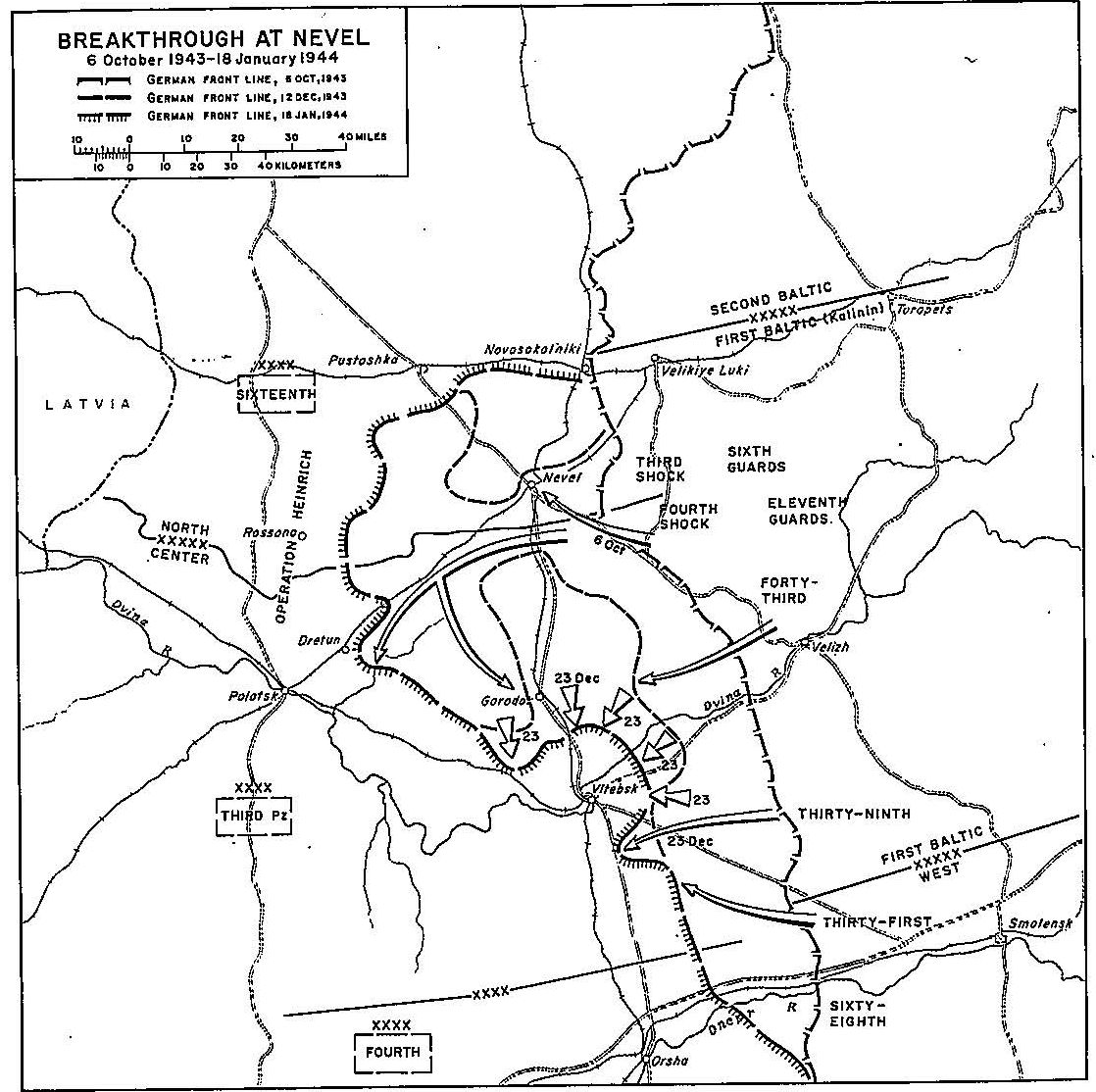
Battle of Nevel (October 1943 - January 1944). Note attacks of 4th Shock Army.

On November 8, the 20th Panzer and 87th Infantry Divisions attacked north into the breakthrough area and gained nearly 8 km by the end of the day, then paused, awaiting a similar attack from Army Group North to seal off the Nevel salient. Beloborodov later wrote:

On the morning of 8 November, we received an alarming report from 156th Rifle Division, which read, "The enemy are advancing and attacking 417th Rifle Regiment with up to 50 tanks and infantry." The subsequent hours passed, marked with ever increasing tension. The Fascists succeeded in penetrating the regiment's sector between Lakes Ezerishche and Ordovo. The enemy's tanks were moving along the road to the north toward Nevel'. By 1500 hours they had captured Blinki, Borok, and a number of other villages. I was forced to change 47th Rifle Division's combat mission. Its regiments counterattacked against the penetrating enemy directly from the march.

Overnight, the remaining rifle divisions of 2nd Guards Corps contained 20th Panzer along the road from Nevel to Haradok. 4th Shock now regrouped to send two groups deep into the German rear. One drove southwest toward Polotsk, while the second wheeled southward to take Haradok from the west; by November 11 the latter was just 22 km away from this key stronghold. At this point deteriorating weather put a halt to the advance, but 20th Panzer was also forced to abandon its push toward Nevel. The 156th was recognized for its successful defense against the initial German drive.

Shortly after midnight on November 12 the STAVKA ordered 4th Shock to "break the German grip on Gorodok and Vitebsk" with additional mobile forces. Among other moves, after concentrating near Lake Svino, the reinforced 2nd Guards Corps was to attack on the morning of November 15 to defeat the German grouping south of Ezerishche. Prior to this, however, 4th Shock received the headquarters of 22nd Guards Rifle Corps, which now contained the 156th, 154th, and 117th Rifle Divisions, and was tasked with defending the south flank of the Nevel salient's "mouth" against any further German counterattacks. The offensive was renewed on November 16, and while on the evening of the 18th a small mobile column broke into Haradok it was soon destroyed by 20th Panzer. This led to a week of fighting west of the city, which finally came to a halt in part due to spring-like thaw conditions.

=== Vitebsk (Gorodok) Offensive ===
Army Gen. I. K. Bagramyan, the new commander of 1st Baltic Front, was ordered to go over to the defense on December 8 for regrouping and refitting in preparation for a new offensive in about a week's time. This would involve a combined operation by 4th Shock on the west side and 11th Guards Army on the east to pinch off the long salient north of Haradok at Bychikha Station, then push south to seize Haradok and, ideally, Vitebsk as well. This attack began on December 13. 4th Shock was operating on a wide front and would make its main attack with the five divisions of 2nd Guards Corps, backed by 60th Corps, over 150 tanks and self-propelled guns, and 3rd Guards Cavalry Corps. 22nd Guards Corps remained on its sector on the west side of the tip of the salient southwest of Lake Ordovo; the 156th was on the Army's left flank, tying in with 11th Guards and facing the 87th Infantry.

11th Guards Army hit the tip of the salient from three directions. Within two days it had penetrated deeply and was on the verge of trapping two German divisions in separate encirclements. 4th Shock also struck, following a 90-minute artillery preparation, focusing on the 129th Infantry Division, with mixed results. 22nd Guards Corps, including part of the 156th, began heavy attacks against the 87th on December 14 and advanced some 1.5 km through heavily forested and swampy terrain, reaching the village of Skarinino. This put the 87th at risk of encirclement if 11th Guards maintained its advance. Gen. G.-H. Reinhardt, commander of 3rd Panzer Army, asked permission to withdraw from the salient, but this was refused. Despite the successes of the offensive in its first days, Bagramyan was impatient with 4th Shock, ordering it to "Develop the offensive resolutely day and night... cut the Nevel'-Vitebsk railroad in the Barkhi and Maleshenki sector at all costs." This urging was not actually necessary as early on December 15, despite counterattacks by 20th Panzer, the two Soviet armies had linked up, completely trapping the 87th and part of the 129th Infantry. The 156th had met elements of 11th Guards Army's 83rd Guards and 29th Rifle Divisions near Laptevka, which completed the encirclement of the 87th west of Surmino. Over the next 24 hours the encircled division struggled to escape the trap, with only limited success.

4th Shock and 11th Guards now turned to the tasks of reducing the pockets and turning to drive south on Haradok. Soviet sources claim a total of 20,000 German losses, while German sources admit just over 2,000. During December 17–18 an advance of 6–8 km was made against withdrawing German forces, which had pulled back in good order some 20 km to new defenses by the 19th. 4th Shock now regrouped south of Lake Kosho, 5–8 km northwest of Haradok, leaving that objective to 11th Guards. Bagramyan directed that this be complete by December 23, after which the Army was to strike southward to cut the Vitebsk–Polotsk highway and rail line and then isolate and destroy the German Vitebsk grouping in cooperation with 43rd and 39th Armies attacking from the east.

This regrouping concentrated the 83rd Rifle and 2nd Guards Rifle Corps on the Army's left (west) wing with most of the mobile forces. 22nd Guards Corps (now the 156th, 154th, and 51st Rifle Divisions) was deployed on a line that stretched to the west from Bandury, roughly in the Army's center. The STAVKA was confident that it had sufficient forces to achieve its objective of taking Vitebsk by January 1, 1944. When the offensive began on December 24 the 11th Guards made only minimal gains south of Haradok, but 83rd and 2nd Guards Corps broke through the defenses at the boundary of IX Army Corps and LIII Army Corps, penetrating up to 4 km and reaching the Sirotino–Vitebsk road to the east and west of Grabnitsa. The Army expanded this penetration the next day when the 156th and 154th Divisions reached the northern outskirts of Sirotino and the defenses of 252nd Infantry Division. At the same time the 2nd Guards Corps punched a hole in the defenses near Grabnitsa, forcing 3rd Panzer Army to attempt to fill the gap with the 5th Jäger Division, while also pulling most of LIII Corps back to new defenses.

December 26 saw the start of a fierce meeting engagement on and south of the Sirotino–Vitebsk road. 2nd Guards Corps was able to cut the rail line with tank and cavalry support before running into counterattacks from 5th Jäger, which over the next two days cleared the line. The 156th just to the west reached the village of Mazurino east of Sirotino. 5th Jäger and 6th Luftwaffe Field Division managed to retake about half of 4th Shock's salient south of the Sirotino–Vitebsk road by December 31, while 11th Guards Army failed to make any progress. Bagramyan persisted with his attacks into the first few days of 1944, particularly with 83rd, 2nd Guards, and 3rd Guards Cavalry Corps, without success. By January 5 the fighting sputtered to a halt.

Under orders from the STAVKA Bagramyan renewed the offensive on January 6 with 4th Shock and 11th Guards attacking from Mashkina southwest to Gorbachi on the Sirotino–Vitebsk road then northwest to Mazurino. Overall this sector formed a broad salient into 3rd Panzer's defenses west-northwest of Vitebsk. The commander of 4th Shock, Lt. Gen. P. F. Malyshev, again formed the 83rd and 2nd Guards Corps as his shock group to make the Army's main attack from the south tip of the salient southwest of Lake Zaronovskoe. 22nd Guards Corps was deployed in the area of Sirotino on the shock group's right flank and was to conduct local attacks against 252nd Infantry to prevent it from transferring reserves to the intended breakthrough sector. By this time all of the Army's divisions had 4,500-5,000 personnel and were significantly understrength. The attack began with a short but powerful artillery preparation but was met with determined resistance. The shock group gained roughly 1–2 km by January 14, and 22nd Guards Corps made no progress at all, with the 156th stuck south of Staraya Igumenshchina. However, the STAVKA insisted that Bagramyan persist in this effort, which he did until January 24 with no better result.

==== Vitebsk Offensive ====
The final attempt to encircle and destroy the German Vitebsk grouping began on February 2. 1st Baltic Front was to concentrate its forces on 4th Shock's left wing and 11th Guards' right wing, assisted by reinforcements from 43rd Army. Bagramyan wrote: "I have decided to employ 20 understrength rifle divisions, two tank corps, three tank brigades, and almost all of the front's artillery and aviation in a penetration operation." 22nd Guards Corps was not part of the shock group and was again to pin down the 5th Jäger and 252nd Infantry, joining the assault when feasible. The offensive began with an extensive artillery preparation and in two days of heavy fighting the shock group was able to gain 3.5 km on a 9 km-wide front. With the support of 5th Tank Corps this was deepened by 4 km over the next two days, before encountering 20th Panzer which stabilized the situation. By the end of February 5, the shock group had broken the forward defense of LIII Corps, but the deeper defense was firming up. The attacks ground on until the morning of February 15 when one last lunge reached the northern approaches to Litovshchina. By now 5th Tanks was down to 10-20 serviceable tanks and the rifle divisions were under 3,000 personnel each. The offensive was officially suspended the next day, and would not resume during the upcoming spring thaw. Later in the month the 22nd Guards Corps, now with just the 156th and 154th Divisions, was reassigned to 43rd Army, remaining in 1st Baltic Front. This Army would soon come under command of General Beloborodov.

== Operation Bagration ==
On March 16, Colonel Nabatov left his deputy command to take over the 154th, and on June 6, just before the start of the summer offensive, Colonel Babak was succeeded by Maj. Gen. Fyodor Ivanovich Gryzlov. This officer had previously led the 222nd Rifle Division. Later in the month 22nd Guards Corps left 43rd Army and the 156th returned to 60th Corps, which also contained the 235th and 334th Rifle Divisions.

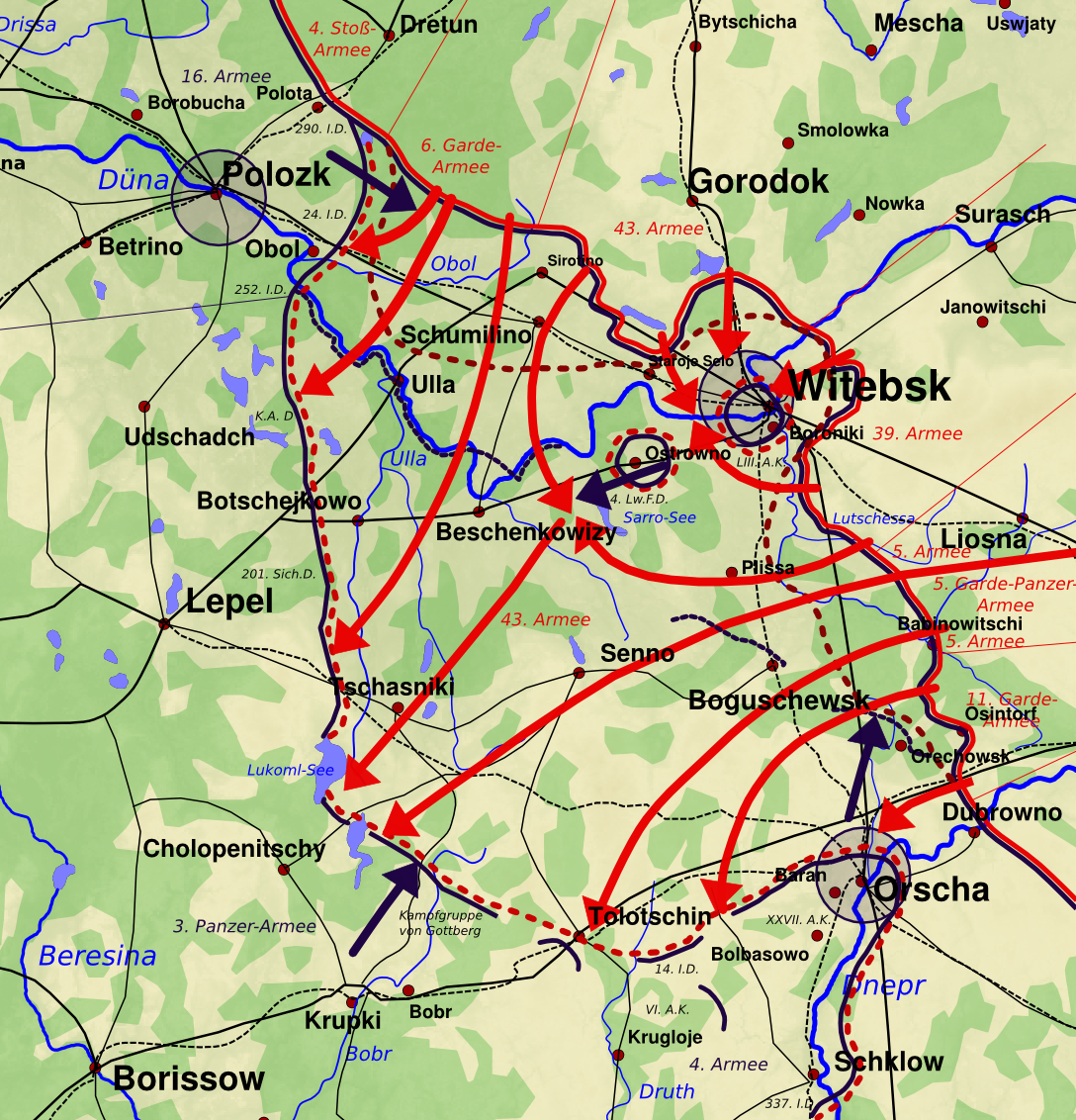
Vitebsk-Orsha Offensive. Note position of 43rd Army.

Beloborodov wrote in his memoirs:

The task of the 60th Rifle Corps of Major General A. S. Lyukhtikov, advancing to the left, was to reliably secure the flank of the strike group from the direction of Vitebsk. The corps, consisting of the 334th, 235th and 156th Rifle Divisions, the 39th Guards Tank Brigade, four artillery and mortar regiments and two battalions of the 5th Assault Engineer-Sapper Brigade, was to seize the Lazuki, Olkhoviki, Yazvino line by the end of the first day, and the advance detachment was to reach the Neporoty, Dutchino line. At the same time, part of the corps forces, deploying their front to the east, was to reach the Bogdanov, Murozhnitsa line and throw the enemy back to Vitebsk.

The 156th held a long sector of the front and was not part of the strike group, which consisted of 1st Rifle Corps and the remainder of 60th Corps. The division would shift aside at the last minute on the attack sector to allow the assault battalions to occupy the trenches.

=== Vitebsk-Polotsk Offensive ===
The offensive began on June 22. Following a very heavy artillery barrage and air attacks, 60th Corps passed through both the first and second German defense lines and reached the Obol River. By the evening of June 23, the 235th and 334th were pressing remnants of German Corps Detachment 'D' south towards the Dvina River west of Vitebsk, while the 156th remained in second echelon. On the following day several bridgeheads were taken and crossing operations began on both sides of Beshankovichy. One combat team was made up of 417th Rifle Regiment with 14 tanks, the 712th Tank Destroyer Regiment, 28th Guards Gun Artillery Brigade, plus several mortar units. Overnight on June 25/26 60th Corps met the 19th Guards Rifle Division of 39th Army at Gnezdilovichi, closing the ring, and through the day forces of both Armies cleared Vitebsk.

Leaving the liquidation of the Vitebsk pocket to other forces, by the end of June 26 the 6th Guards Army had advanced as far as the approaches to Polotsk, while Beloborodov's immediate objective was the town of Lyepyel. The Front's forces would have to overcome a vast stretch of lakes and creeks between those two places, which strengthened the German defense, which was also receiving fresh reserves on the Lyepyel axis. The next day the 1st Corps and the 43rd's mobile group continued the advance on this line. Meanwhile, from noon to 1600 hours an encircled group of some 2,500 troops attempted to find a way out to the west from a point some 8 km south of Beshankovichy. It had already broken through the 19th Guards Rifle Division before being intercepted in the Svetogory area by other forces of 39th Army, but managed to escape again with heavy losses before running into the headquarters of 60th Corps near Yakubovshchina. As the headquarters and the operational group of 43rd Army's headquarters resisted any breakthrough to Lyepyel elements of the 156th arrived. The Corps commander, Maj. Gen. A. S. Liukhtikov, made use of all men and materiel available to him and eventually the German group was defeated, with 200 killed and 500 officers and men taken prisoner. The few remnants were soon rounded up by forces of 5th Army. By July 1 the division had been reassigned to 92nd Rifle Corps as the exploitation phase continued. It would remain in this corps for most of the duration of the war.

During June 29–30 both the 60th and 92nd Corps overcame resistance along 43rd Army's front, including that of the recently committed 212th Infantry Division, and covered 28–36 km over those two days. The next day Beloborodov was directed to leave two divisions of 1st Corps on his left flank and advance with his remaining forces to the northwest to outflank Lake Sho from north and south and head in the direction of Glubokoe. Polotsk was cleared by 6th Guards Army on July 4, leaving the defenders falling back on the right bank of the Dvina. The previous day, 92nd Corps, in cooperation with units of 1st Tank Corps, had taken Glubokoe.

== Baltic Offensives ==
By July 8 the 43rd Army had advanced deeply into the so-called "Baltic Gap" that had developed between Army Group Center and Army Group and was approaching Švenčionys in Lithuania. By July 22 a favorable situation had come about for 1st Baltic and 3rd Belorussian Fronts to develop the ofensive toward Daugavpils, Panevėžys, and Šiauliai. The German grouping in and around Daugavpils was facing encirclement, and chose to attack the forces of 1st Baltic between there and Šiauliai, primarily 92nd and 1st Corps, in an effort to escape. The attackers included 11th SS Division Nordland, 58th and 225th Infantry Divisions, 393rd Assault Gun Brigade, and other units. Despite this, 51st Army was successful in taking Panevėžys the same day. Under the circumstances, with 43rd Army resisting successfully, on July 24 Bagramyan chose to continue advancing with his remaining forces in an effort to cut off not just the Daugavpils grouping, but all of Army Group North, from its communications with East Prussia.

The Front's situation improved further on July 25 as 4th Shock Army, now in 2nd Baltic Front, moved up to Daugavpils and prepared to take it by storm, and the counterattacks against 43rd Army had almost totally ended. 51st and 2nd Guards Armies advanced along the Panevėžys–Šiauliai axis without serious opposition and were threatening to reach the Gulf of Riga. Beloborodov was ordered to maintain his current positions while also preparing to move to the northwest. On July 27 the German Daugavpils grouping began a hurried retreat in the same direction, and the city fell to 4th Shock, but 43rd Army had little success when it attacked in the afternoon. The next day the 43rd and 51st Armies opened the Šiauliai–Riga operational axis, but their forces were scattered along a 206 km-wide frontage. The 43rd pushed ahead 20 km on July 28 before increasing resistance forced a halt. On the morning of July 31 the 3rd Guards Mechanized Corps took the town of Tukums and cut the remaining road from Germany to Army Group North. At this time the 156th was in the vicinity of Kupiškis.

On August 16 the two German Army Groups launched a major attack to reopen the supply lines, Operation Doppelkopf. At this time the 156th Was under command of 51st Army's 1st Guards Rifle Corps, and was located west of Bauska. once this ended on August 27 the division returned to 92nd Corps in 43rd Army. Beloborodov mentioned in his memoirs the effectiveness of reconnaissance of both the 156th and 235th Divisions along the Lielupe River in early September. On the night of September 12/13 one successful patrol was led by Sen. Lt. Ivan Kuzmich Zherebtsov, commander of the 183rd Reconnaissance Company, across the river near the village of Pazoli. Successfully outflanking a garrison of some 40 German officers and men the patrol got into its rear and then attacked toward the shore, destroying a bunker and taking six prisoners before returning without losses. For this exploit, and several others since January, on March 24, 1945, Zherebtsov was made a Hero of the Soviet Union. He would be discharged with the rank of captain in 1946 and worked in Moscow at a research institute until his retirement. He died there on December 24, 1995, at the age of 78.

Although the connection between the two Army Groups had been restored, the 1st and 2nd Baltic Fronts now set out to finally isolate Army Group North and take Riga. In mid-September the 156th was still in the Bauska area, some 66 km from Riga. By October 5 it had moved with its army to the vicinity of Radviliškis in Lithuania. Riga fell on October 13 and on October 22 the division would be awarded the Order of Kutuzov, 2nd Degree, for its role in the battles southeast of the city. Prior to this the 43rd Army had been redirected toward Šiauliai. On September 29 it was ordered to advance in the general direction of Memel, with six divisions in first echelon and six more in second.

=== Advance on Memel ===
Overnight on October 3/4 the 1st, 19th, and 92nd Rifle Corps were deployed on an attack frontage some 9 km wide while 90th Rifle Corps covered the Army's left flank frontage of 35 km. However, due to heavy rain and mist the offensive was delayed until 1100 hours on October 5. Kuršėnai was soon cleared as the resistance of the 551st Volksgrenadier Division collapsed. However, over the next two days the 92nd Corps was delayed at Lukniki, in part by the arrival of elements of Großdeutschland Division. However, by October 9 the Minija River had been forced by the Front's forces. Army Group North was again cut off by this time, and a German grouping of some 18 battalions and 40 tanks and self-propelled guns, under command of XXXX Panzer Corps, was falling back into the stout defenses of Memel. The first attack against these went in on October 11, but the Army did not have enough heavy artillery to make much impression as 92nd Corps made its way to the coast to cut the city off from the northeast. On October 13 the Army went over to the defense.

=== Courland Pocket ===
By the start of November the 156th had been assigned again to 1st Guards Corps in 51st Army, but later in the month it returned to 92nd Corps in 43rd Army. At the start of the new year the Corps was still in that Army, but during January, now with just the 156th and 179th Divisions under command, was transferred to 4th Shock Army, which would not take part in the winter offensive into East Prussia, but would instead remain containing Army Group Courland. In February, 4th Shock was transferred to 2nd Baltic Front. In March the Army became part of the Kurland Group of Forces in Leningrad Front. General Gryzlov was hospitalized due to illness on April 16, and was replaced by Col. Vasilii Ivanovich Kuleshov, who had been serving as chief of staff. This officer was in turn replaced on May 4 by Col. Nikolai Konstantinovich Filippov for the last few days before the German surrender.

== Postwar ==
Like the rest of the Kurland Group of Forces the personnel of the 156th spent several weeks rounding up and processing the surrendered German forces and then remained in Latvia under command of 92nd Corps into the summer of 1946. The division was disbanded there in June.
