= 347th Rifle Division =

347th Rifle Division (September 16, 1941 – 1946)
- Active: 1941–1946
- Country: Soviet Union
- Branch: Red Army
- Type: Division
- Role: Infantry
- Engagements: Battle of Rostov (1941); Battle of the Caucasus; Donbas Strategic Offensive (August 1943); Melitopol Offensive; Crimean Offensive; Baltic Offensive; Šiauliai Offensive; Riga Offensive (1944); Memel Offensive Operation; Kurland Pocket
- Decorations: Order of the Red Banner; Order of Suvorov
- Battle honours: Melitopol

Commanders
- Notable commanders: Maj. Gen. Nikolai Ivanovich Seliverstov; Maj. Gen. Aleksandr Kharitonovich Ukhimchuk

The 347th Rifle Division began forming in mid-September 1941, as a Red Army rifle division, in the North Caucasus Military District. It was soon assigned to the 58th Army while both it and its Army continued to form up before entering combat in November, as part of the offensive that first liberated Rostov-on-Don. During the German summer offensive in 1942 the division retreated back into the Caucasus, fighting to defend the routes to the oil fields at Baku, until the German forces began to retreat after their defeat at Stalingrad. During 1943 and early 1944 it continued to serve in the southern part of the front, taking part in the liberation of Crimea, before being transferred to the Baltic States region, serving in Latvia and Lithuania for the duration of the war, compiling a distinguished record of service along the way. In 1946 it was reformed as a rifle brigade, and its several successor formations remained part of the Red (later, Soviet) Army until 1959, when it was finally disbanded.

== Formation ==
The division officially formed on September 16, 1941, at Krasnodar in the North Caucasus Military District. Its order of battle was as follows:

- 1175th Rifle Regiment
- 1177th Rifle Regiment
- 1179th Rifle Regiment
- 907th Artillery Regiment

Col. Nikolai Ivanovich Seliverstov was assigned to command of the division on the day it began forming, and he continued in command until mid-September 1942; he returned to command on September 28 with the rank of Major General, and remained in that post until May 8, 1943.

About a month after forming, the division was assigned to 56th Army, which was also in the process of forming up near Krasnodar. In November it moved, with its Army, to join Southern Front and take part in the offensive that liberated Rostov-on-Don for the first time and drove 1st Panzer Army back to the Mius River. The 347th remained in 56th Army until April 1942, when it was assigned to the Front reserves. In July it retreated into the Caucasus region and by August 1 it was assigned to 37th Army in the North Caucasus Front.

=== Caucasus Campaign ===
When 1st Panzer Army began its offensive towards the Soviet oil-producing center at Mozdok on August 16, the division was in the reserves of Gen. I. I. Maslennikov's Northern Group of Forces in North Caucasus Front. In common with the other reserves of the Group, the division was woefully understrength in manpower and heavy weapons. While the German armor pushed through and seized Mozdok on August 25, the Soviet defenses were reorganized, and within days the advance came to a standstill. The 347th, along with most of the rest of Maslennikov's reserves, was concentrated in the depths along the Ordzhonikidze and Grozny axes.

In the first week of September the Panzer Army renewed its drive, but it proved a slow and grinding advance. which was finally halted on September 28. Maslennikov's forces were also badly depleted from heavy defensive fighting as well as numerous counterattacks. The following day, orders from the STAVKA directed the following concentration:

"The 414th and 347th Rifle Divisions, 11th Guards Rifle Corps, 84th and 131st Rifle Brigades, and 5th Guards Tank Brigade in the Nizhnye Achaluki, Psedakh, and Zamankul regions [south of Mozdok and the lower Terek River].

By late October the division had come under command of 9th Army, which was being readied for a spoiling attack to preempt a further German offensive, but the Germans struck first. In the event, although German armor reached the outskirts of Ordzhonikidze on November 3 and 4, they were soon forced to retreat.

=== Donbas and Crimean Offensives ===
From December the division was part of 44th Army, which was transferred from North Caucasus Front to Southern Front in February 1943. On May 9, Col. Aleksandr Kharitonovich Ukhimchuk took command of the division from General Seliverstov, and he would hold that command to the end of the war, being promoted to Major General on September 15. Seliverstov was re-assigned to command of the 33rd Guards Rifle Division, and was mortally wounded by enemy shellfire in the fighting along the Mius River in late July.

Just before Southern Front began its offensive into the Donbas in August the division was reassigned to the 28th Army in the same Front (renamed 4th Ukrainian Front on October 20), where it remained until November. During this operation towards the Dniepr in the late summer, the 907th Artillery Regiment had a non-standard organization; each of the three battalions had three batteries, one of 122mm howitzers and two of 76mm cannon (12 pieces total). However, while the 1st Battalion had truck-drawn howitzers and horse-drawn cannons, the 2nd Battalion was entirely horse-drawn, freeing up enough trucks to make the 3rd Battalion completely motorized. This allowed that battalion to advance with and support whichever other motorized elements of the division were formed as the forward detachment.

On October 23, the division was recognized for its role in the liberation of the Ukrainian city of Melitopol, and received its name as an honorific:

"MELITOPOL - ...347th Rifle Division (Major General Ukhimchuk, Aleksandr Kharitonovich)... By order of the Supreme High Command of 23 October 1943 and a commendation in Moscow, the troops who participated in the battles for the liberation of Melitopol are given a salute of 20 artillery salvoes from 224 guns."

As 28th Army approached the Crimea on October 30, the 347th was directed to attempt to pass through the Arabat Spit, one of the three traditional entryways to the peninsula. The German defenses were sparse, with just a battlegroup of German Air Force Jäger Regiment 10 guarding the village of Genischek. At the last moment a battalion of the 686th Grenadier Regiment, plus some antitank guns, were ferried across from the Chongar Peninsula to reinforce the Spit. In the late afternoon, elements of the division cleared Genischek, but were later halted by the German grenadiers. Given the narrow confines and nature of the terrain, the Arabat is only viable as an entryway if it is uncontested, and no further efforts were made on this route.

In November the division was reassigned to 51st Army in the same Front, in the 55th Rifle Corps at the beginning of February. Later that month the entire Corps was transferred to the 2nd Guards Army and the 347th participated in the Crimea Operation from March to May in this Army. In recognition of its role in the success of the Perekop and Sivash operations the 347th was awarded the Order of the Red Banner on April 24. Exactly one month later the division was further awarded the Order of Suvorov, 2nd Class, for its role in the liberation of Sevastopol.

== Baltic Offensives ==
Following the liberation of the Crimea in late May, 4th Ukrainian Front found itself in a strategic dead-end. In a major redeployment, 2nd Guards and 51st Armies were shifted to the Reserve of the Supreme High Command, and were then railed northwards in anticipation of the coming summer offensives. In late June the 347th returned to the front in 1st Guards Rifle Corps, back in 51st Army, where it would remain for the duration, now serving in 1st Baltic Front. Exploiting into the gap in the German front created by the destruction of Army Group Centre, by mid-July 51st Army had advanced past the eastern Lithuanian border near the city of Švenčionys. Over the next three weeks the division made a significant advance into northern Lithuania, reaching the vicinity of Linkuva by August 1. When Third Panzer Army launched Operation Doppelkopf on the 15th, the 347th was located on the Lielupe River in Latvia, northwest of Jelgava. By mid-September 51st Army had been shifted to the south, roughly along the Latvian/Lithuanian border, near Eleja. It was still in these positions in the first week of October at the start of the Memel Offensive Operation, which finally cut off Army Group North and created the Kurland Pocket.

== Postwar ==
The division remained in western Lithuania for the rest of the war. In February 1945, it was briefly reassigned to 2nd Baltic Front, before being moved, with its Army, to the Kurland Group of Leningrad Front for the last two months of the war. At this time it was in 10th Rifle Corps. The men and women of the division ended the war with the full title of 347th Rifle, Melitopol, Order of the Red Banner, Order of Suvorov Division (Russian: 347-я стрелковая Мелитопольская Краснознамённая ордена Суворова дивизия).

In August 1945, the 347th and the 10th Rifle Corps relocated to the Kazan Military District. The division was initially at Kirov but moved to Perm in the Ural Military District, where it was downsized into the 36th Separate Rifle Brigade in 1946. In October 1953, it became the 65th Mechanized Division. In the summer of 1956, the 65th moved back to Kirov. On 4 June 1957, it was converted into the 65th Motor Rifle Division at Kungur and disbanded on 10 January 1959.
