= Vasily Khomenko =

Soviet army commander (1899–1943)

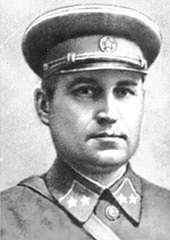
- Major General Khomenko
- Born: 30 March 1899; Russian Empire
- Died: 9 November 1943 (aged 44) Velyka Lepetykha, Reichskommissariat Ukraine
- Allegiance: Soviet Union
- Branch: Red Army
- Service years: 1918–1943
- Rank: Lieutenant general
- Commands: 30th Army; 24th Army; 58th Army; 44th Army
- Conflicts: Russian Civil War; Insurgency in Chechnya; World War II; Battle of Moscow

Vasily Afanasyevich Khomenko (30 March 1899 – 9 November 1943) was a Soviet army commander, and Lieutenant General.

== Biography ==
Vasily Afanasyevich Khomenko was born on March 30, 1899, in a Ukrainian family in the village of Petrovsky, now in the Borisoglebsky District, Voronezh Oblast.

He fought in the Red Army since 1918. In 1920 he graduated as military commissioner. During the Russian Civil War, he was platoon commander, military officer and commander of a regiment.

After the war he commanded a regiment in the fight against the Basmachis on the Turkestan front. Since 1924, he was commissioner of the fortified district around the fortress of Kushka. In 1928, he graduated from KUVNAS at the Military Academy of M.V. Frunze. Since 1935 he served in the border troops of the NKVD, as chief of the department of staff, then as chief of staff of the border and internal troops of the NKVD LVO. In November 1940, he headed the border troops of the NKVD of Moldova and the Ukrainian USSR. On June 12, 1941, he was deputy commander of the Kiev Special Military District troops.

=== World War II ===
After the outbreak of World War II, he became on July 12, 1941, the commander of the 30th Army, which at the end of July is included in the Western Front. Under his command, the army participated in the Battle of Smolensk, defensive battles in the Rzhevsky District and in the Kalinin defensive operation. In early December 1941, he was appointed deputy commander of the Moscow Defence Zone.

In August 1942 he briefly served as commander of the 24th Army, then appointed commander of the newly formed 58th Army as part of the Transcaucasian Front. In this position, he led the troops in the pacification of the area around Makhachkala. On November 21, 1942, he was appointed commander of the 44th Army. Under his leadership, the army participated in the Battles of the Caucasus, Rostov, Miusskaya, Donbass, Melitopol offensive operations and liberated the cities of Voroshilovsk (now Stavropol), Taganrog, Yudanov (now Mariupol) and Azov. At the end of October 1943, the army was withdrawn to the front reserve and occupied the defense of the line Zavadivka - Kakhovka - Dniprjany.

He was killed in action on 9 November 1943, when his vehicle mistakenly rode into enemy lines. Joseph Stalin mistakenly believed he had defected to Nazi Germany and disbanded his army. He was a recipient of the Order of the Red Banner, the Order of Kutuzov and the Order of the Red Star.

Preceded by New office	Commander of the 30th Army; July–November 1941	Succeeded by Dmitry Lelyushenko
Preceded by Vladimir Martsinkevich	Commander of the 24th Army; 7–23 August 1942	Succeeded by Dmitry Timofeyevich Kozlov
Preceded by Aleksei Zygin	Commander of the 58th Army; September–November 1942	Succeeded by Kondrat Melnik
Preceded by Kondrat Melnik	Commander of the 44th Army; November 1942 – 9 November 1943	Succeeded by none, army disbanded
