= 263rd Division =

263rd Division may refer to:

- 263rd Infantry Division, Wehrmacht, Germany
- 263rd Rifle Division, Soviet Union

== See also ==
- List of military divisions by number
