= 263rd Rifle Division =

- Active: July 1941 – 1946
- Country: Soviet Union
- Branch: Red Army
- Type: Rifle division
- Engagements: World War II; Continuation War; Donbas Strategic Offensive; Melitopol Offensive; Crimean Offensive; Siauliai Offensive; Riga Offensive; Battle of Königsberg
- Battle honours: Sivash

Commanders
- Notable commanders: Grigory Krivolapov; Pavel Volosatykh; Kornily Cherepanov

The 263rd Rifle Division (Russian: 263-я стрелковая дивизия) was an infantry division of the Red Army during World War II.

Formed in mid-1941, the division fought in the Continuation War against Finland in Karelia until the beginning of 1943, when it transferred to the Southwestern Front in Ukraine. After fighting in the Crimean Offensive in the spring of 1944, the division was transferred to the Baltics and advanced westward into East Prussia at the end of the war. Postwar, the division was withdrawn to Crimea, downsized into a separate rifle brigade, and disbanded.

== History ==
=== World War II ===
The 263rd Rifle Division began forming on 10 July 1941 at Vologda in the Arkhangelsk Military District. It included the 993rd, 995th, and 997th Rifle Regiments, as well as the 853rd Artillery Regiment. In December 1941, the division became part of the Karelian Front. It spent most of the next 14 months with 26th Army facing Finnish troops north of Lake Onega in the Continuation War. In January 1943, the division was withdrawn to the Reserve of the Supreme High Command (RVGK), and relocated south to the Southwestern Front. On 11 June, Colonel Pavel Volosatykh took command of the division, which fought in the Donbass Strategic Offensive during the summer of 1943 as part of the front's 6th Army, and on 23 September it was transferred to the RVGK.

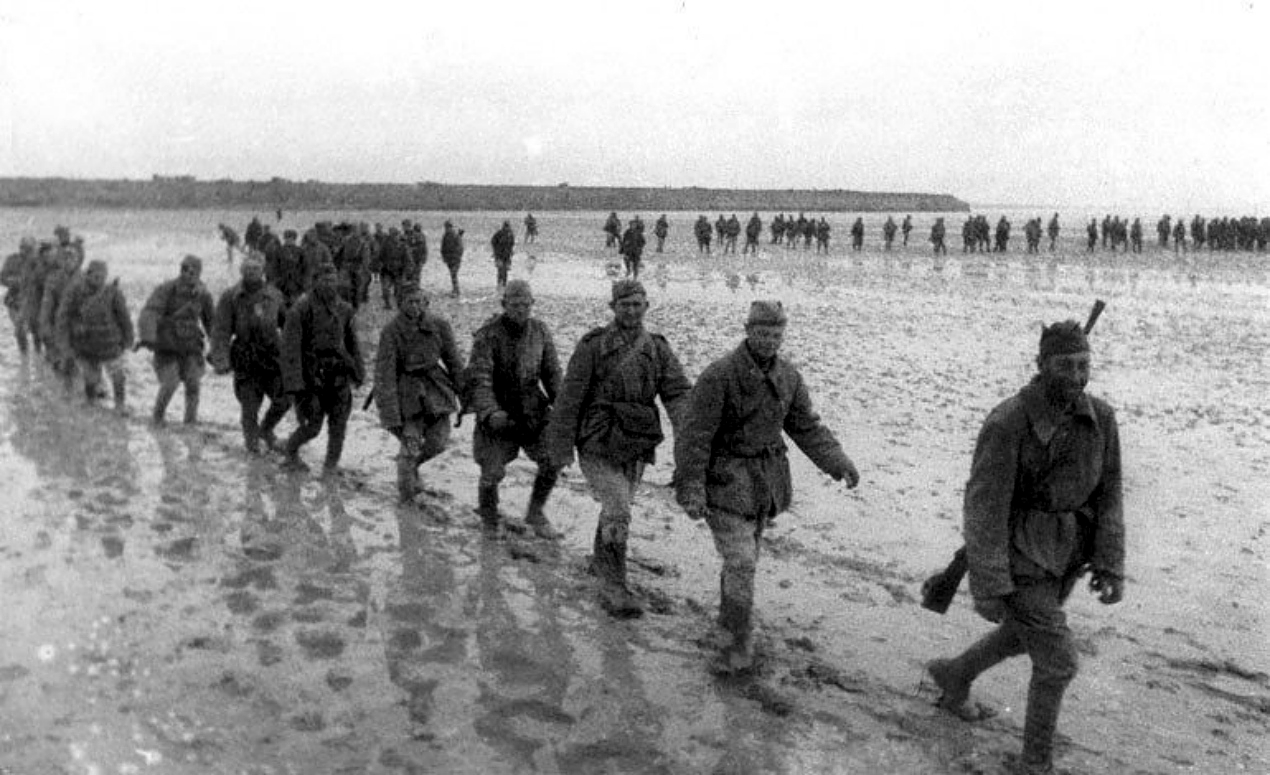
Soviet troops crossing the Sivash into Crimea

At the end of October, the 263rd became part of the 4th Ukrainian Front's 28th Army and fought in the Melitopol Offensive. On 5 November, the division moved across the Sivash, joining the 51st Army's 54th Rifle Corps in its Crimean bridgehead. It fought with the army in the Crimean Offensive in the spring of 1944, breaking through the German defensive lines on the southern coast of the Sivash and capturing Dzhankoy. On 16 April, its units captured Bakhchysarai and reached the approaches to Sevastopol. For its actions, the division was awarded the honorific "Sivash" on 24 April, and Volosatykh received the title Hero of the Soviet Union on 16 May. He was promoted to corps command on 18 April and was replaced by Major General Alexander Pykhtin. The division subsequently fought in the recapture of Sevastopol.

At the end of May it was assigned to the 2nd Guards Army when the entire front was transferred to the RVGK. The division moved north with the 2nd Guards Army and joined the 1st Baltic Front in July 1944 during the advance into southern Lithuania, the Siauliai Offensive. The division then fought in the Riga Offensive from September and the Memel Offensive in October. Between 5 and 12 October, it broke through strong fortified defenses on the Dubysa River and developed the breakthrough into a 120-kilometer advance in a week that brought it to the Neman River. In November, the 263rd was transferred to the 43rd Army. On 22 November, Pykhtin was sent to military academy courses and was replaced by Colonel Kornily Cherepanov.

In January 1945, the army became part of the 3rd Belorussian Front, fighting in the Insterburg–Königsberg Offensive, part of the East Prussian Offensive. Between 20 and 23 January, the division captured Tilsit, Heinrichswalde, and Labiau. The 263rd then fought in the Battle of Königsberg, taking in part in the capture of the city on 9 April. After the fall of the city, the 43rd Army and the division joined the 2nd Belorussian Front in East Prussia. At the end of the war the 263rd was still with the 43rd Army's 54th Rifle Corps near the German Baltic coast.

=== Postwar ===
The division remained with the 54th Rifle Corps in the Northern Group of Forces after the end of the war. Around late 1945 and early 1946, the 263rd was withdrawn to Feodosia in the Tauric Military District with the 54th Rifle Corps. It was downsized into the 19th Separate Rifle Brigade there and disbanded in March 1947.

== Commanders ==
The following officers commanded the division during World War II:

- Major General Lazar Fishman (10 July 1941–30 April 1942)
- Lieutenant Colonel Fyodor Krasavin (31 April–10 September 1942)
- Lieutenant Colonel Nikolay Pimenov (1–9 October 1942)
- Colonel Grigory Krivolapov (10 October 1942–10 June 1943)
- Colonel Pavel Volosatykh (11 June 1943–18 April 1944)
- Major General Alexander Pykhtin (19 April–22 November 1944)
- Colonel Kornily Cherepanov (23 November 1944–after 9 May 1945)
