= Georgy Sofronov =

Soviet general (1893-1973)

- Native name: Георгий Софронов
- Born: 19 April 1893; Serpukhov, Russian Empire
- Died: 17 March 1973 (aged 79) Moscow, Soviet Union
- Allegiance: Russian Empire; Soviet Union
- Branch: Imperial Russian Army; Soviet Red Army
- Service years: 1914–1917 (Russian Empire); 1918–1953 (Soviet Union)
- Rank: lieutenant general
- Commands: 17th Rifle Division; 12th Rifle Corps; 18th Rifle Corps; 16th Rifle Corps; Separate Coastal Army
- Conflicts: World War I; Russian Civil War; World War II; Siege of Odessa

Georgy Pavlovich Sofronov (Russian: Георгий Павлович Софронов; 19 April 1893 – 17 March 1973) was a Soviet general. He fought for the Imperial Russian Army during World War I and fought for the Workers and Peasants Red Army during the subsequent Civil War. He was made a Kombrig (brigade commander) in 1935 and a Komkor (corps commander) in 1937. During Operation Barbarossa, he defended the city of Odessa against the forces of Nazi Germany and Romania. He was a recipient of the Order of Lenin, the Order of the Red Banner, the Order of Kutuzov and the Order of Suvorov.

== Early life and education ==
He was one of seven children of Pavel Stepanovych Sofronov and Pelageya Ivanovna, who were illiterate. In his memoirs, he recalled that they had all lived in a single room, his mother sleeping on a wooden bed, his father on a chest of drawers, someone else on the stove, and the others on the floor. His father and his brother Andrew worked on the railway; the family had a cow, “some small domestic animals,” and a small potato patch.

Sofronov graduated from rural primary school. In 1904, his father was transferred to the Tarusskaya station of the Moscow-Kursk railway, and the family moved there. In 1906 Sofronov graduated from a small railway school in Serpukhov. In his youth he worked as a railway clerk, a maintenance worker, and then, beginning in 1912, an accountant in the Serpukhov municipal government.

He began to be active in Marxist circles in 1910, and in 1912 joined the Russian Social Democratic Labour Party (RSDLP), its Bolshevik faction.

In 1915, he graduated from the Third Moscow School of Ensigns. In 1918-20, he took two courses at the Military Academy of the Red Army, and after taking refresher courses there in 1924 was officially designated a graduate of the Academy. He took further courses there in 1935.

== Military career ==
=== World War I ===
In the autumn of 1914, he was drafted into the Russian Imperial Army, being placed first in the Moscow Reserve Regiment and then in the 56th Infantry Reserve Battalion. Beginning in February 1915 he fought on the Western front as part of the 2nd Siberian Rifle Regiment of the 1st Siberian Army Corps. After an interval of study, as noted above, at the Third Moscow School of Ensigns, which he attended from July to November 1915, he returned to active duty in early 1916. After serving as a junior officer in the 458th Suzhansky Infantry Regiment in the 6th Army on the Romanian front, he was made a platoon commander in the regiment’s training team. While in service, he sustained an injury and held the rank of ensign.

=== Revolution and Civil War ===
While on the Romanian front, Sofronov was an active participant in the revolutionary events of 1917, leading a Red Guard detachment to Odessa and taking part in the Bolshevik uprising in that city on January 15–18, 1918. It was as a result of that uprising that Soviet power was established in Odessa.

In January and February 1918, he was a member of the leadership of the 6th Army, participating in hostilities against Romanian troops in Bessarabia. In March 1918, he went to Moscow where he was active in the 4th Congress of Soviets. Beginning in April 1918, he served in the Red Army on the North-Ural-Siberian Front, acting, in turn, as head of the operations department at the Army’s headquarters on that front, head of the garrison at Yekaterinburg, and head of the operations department at the 3rd Army headquarters. He was among those who put down the rebellion in the Czechoslovak Corps and participated in the execution of the Russian Royal Family.

While pursuing further studies, beginning in 1918, at the Academy of the General Staff of the Red Army, he served as deputy chairman of the party bureau at the academy. In April 1919, after completing one course at the Academy, he returned to the Eastern Front, where he fought against the troops of Admiral A. V. Kolchak. He served in turn as chief of staff of the Vyatka fortified area, as its commandant, then as commander of the 256th Rifle Regiment. He distinguished himself during the capture of the city of Glazov and the crossing of the Kama River. In August 1919, he was transferred to the 7th Army, where he was chief of staff of the 2nd Rifle Brigade of the 2nd Rifle Division, then commander of that brigade. He participated in the defense of Petrograd under the command of General Nikolai Yudenich. In late 1919, he returned to the Academy for further education.

Beginning in the summer of 1920, he worked at the headquarters of the 1st Revolutionary Labor Army (Urals), then served in turn as deputy military commissar in Yekaterinburg, as commander of the CHON special brigade, and as chairman of the Army’s committee for combating desertion. Beginning in January 1921, he served as Assistant Chief of Staff of the Donetsk Labor Army and participated in hostilities against the Makhnovists and various gangs in the Donbas.

=== Interwar period ===
During the years between the wars, Sofronov served in a number of military roles. In autumn 1921 he was named the commandant of the Arkhangelsk fortified area, provincial military commissar of Arkhangelsk, and commander of the 52nd Separate Rifle Brigade. In July 1922 he became commander, and in December 1922 became military commissar, of the 17th Rifle Division, serving first in Ryazan and then in Nizhny Novgorod. He then served in turn as commander and military commissar of varus rifle corps, as Assistant Commander of the Volga Military District (1932–35), and as commander of the troops and a member of the military council of the Ural Military District (1937–38). Beginning in July 1938 he was at the disposal of the Office of the Command and the Command Staff of the Red Army; later he became chief of the Directorate of the Higher Military Educational Institutions of the Red Army and first deputy commander of the Baltic Special Military District. On June 6, 1940, he was promoted to the rank of lieutenant general.

=== World War II ===
When World War II began, most of the soldiers in the Baltic Special Military District were transformed into the North-Western Front under Sofronov’s command. On July 26, 1941, he took command of the Separate Coastal Army of the Southern Front, and led the stubborn Defense of Odessa.

In early October 1941, Sofronov had a severe heart attack after receiving news of the death of his only son in battle. On October 5 he was taken to hospital in Sevastopol, and then to Kislovodsk. His health problems would prevent him to return to a position as battlefield commander for the rest of the War. Beginning in April 1942, he was Assistant Commander of the Western Front. He was hospitalized again from May to September 1944, then spent the rest of the war as Assistant Commander of the 3rd Byelorussian Front, although his health was poor.

=== After the war ===
From 1945-46 he was Deputy Commander of the Baranovichi Military District; from May to October 1946 he was senior lecturer at the Voroshilov Higher Military Academy, and thereafter served as head of the Department of the Airborne Forces at that institution. In 1953, he went into the reserves, and during his later years lived in Moscow. He is buried at the Donskoy Cemetery in Moscow.

== Honors and awards ==
He received the Order of Lenin, five Orders of the Red Banner, the Order of Kutuzov 1st degree (04/19/1945), the Order of Suvorov, 2nd class (09/28/1943), as well as various medals.
