= Taurida Military District =

- Active: 9 July 1945 – 4 April 1956
- Country: Soviet Union
- Type: Military district
- Headquarters: Simferopol

Commanders
- Notable commanders: Markian Popov; Ivan Lyudnikov

The Taurida Military District was a military district of the Soviet Union. It was formed from the headquarters of the Separate Coastal Army and the 22nd Army in the summer of 1945. The military district controlled troops on the territory of the Crimean, Kherson and Zaporizhia Oblasts. It was disbanded in 1956, being replaced by the Odessa Military District.

== History ==
The Taurida Military District was formed on 9 July 1945 from the headquarters of the Separate Coastal Army and the 22nd Army in Simferopol. It controlled troops on the territory of the Crimean Oblast, Kherson Oblast and Zaporizhia Oblast, transferred from the Odessa and Kharkov Military Districts. Separate Coastal Army commander Lieutenant General Kondrat Melnik took command of the district. In its early years, the district was tasked with demobilizing combat troops, reducing units to peacetime strength, rebuilding military bases, demining, and helping to rebuild the local economy.

The 112th Rifle Corps, relocated from Estonia, was initially part of the district with headquarters at Kherson. After its 44th Rifle Division at Melitopol transferred to Pavlohrad in the Kiev Military District, the corps was left with only the 123rd Rifle Division at Kherson. The corps headquarters and the 123rd Rifle Division were disbanded in April 1946. The Separate Coastal Army's 315th and 414th Rifle Divisions at Kerch and Dzhankoy, respectively, were also part of the district. The 414th soon transferred to Tbilisi. During the winter and spring of 1946, the 53rd Rifle Corps arrived from Poland and established its headquarters at Simferopol. It included the 126th, 235th and 263rd Rifle Divisions, based at Simferopol, Yevpatoriya and Feodosia, respectively. The corps headquarters and the 235th Rifle Division disbanded in July 1946. At the same time the 25th Guards Rifle Corps, formerly of the 7th Guards Army, arrived with headquarters at Zaporizhia from Czechoslovakia. Its 4th Guards Rifle Division was based at Melitopol and disbanded in summer 1946. The 25th Guards Rifle Division was based at Zaporizhia and soon moved to Lubny, being replaced by the 188th Rifle Division from the Southern Group of Forces. The 113th Guards Rifle Division was based at Yevpatoriya. In the fall of 1946 the corps headquarters disbanded.

In 1946, the district was reorganized. The 126th Rifle Division became the 28th Mechanized Division and four divisions became brigades, the rest being disbanded or transferred. By the spring of 1947, the district included the 28th Mechanized Division, the 7th Separate Rifle Brigade (former 315th Rifle Division), 19th Separate Rifle Brigade (former 263rd Rifle Division), 43rd Separate Guards Rifle Brigade (former 113th Guards Rifle Division) and 52nd Separate Rifle Brigade (former 188th Rifle Division). The 19th Separate Rifle Brigade was disbanded soon after. Following the end of the demobilizations of military units, the district began regular combat training for defense against an amphibious invasion and cooperation with the Black Sea Fleet. Between 1950 and 1953 the divisions became brigades again. In 1955, the 188th was redesignated as the 20th and the 315th as the 52nd.

By a directive of 19 April 1956 its territory was assigned to the Odessa Military District and the district was disbanded in a process completed by 1 July. Its headquarters was reformed as the 45th Rifle Corps on 4 April.

== Commanders ==
The military district was commanded by the following officers:

- Lieutenant General Kondrat Melnik (9 July 1945 – 3 June 1946)
- Colonel General Markian Popov (4 June 1946 – 1 July 1954)
- Lieutenant General Sergey Fomenko (2 July – 1 September 1954)
- Colonel General Ivan Lyudnikov (2 September 1954 – 4 April 1956)
