= 400th Rifle Division =

400th Rifle Division (August 1941 – June 14, 1942)
- Active: 1941 - 1942
- Country: Soviet Union
- Branch: Red Army
- Type: Division
- Role: Infantry
- Engagements: Battle of the Kerch Peninsula

Commanders
- Notable commanders: Col. Ilya Vasilevich Korchagin; Col. Yakov Yakovlevich Verbov

The 400th Rifle Division was raised in 1941 as an infantry division of the Red Army, and fought the German invasion - Operation Barbarossa - in 1941–42. The division followed a very similar combat path to that of the 398th Rifle Division through its existence. It was first formed in August in the Transcaucasus Military District. In January, 1942 it was moved to the Crimea where it joined the 47th Army in Crimean Front. On May 8, now in the 51st Army, it came under attack by the German 11th Army as part of Operation Trappenjagd and within weeks it was destroyed in the Kerch peninsula, being officially disbanded on June 14 after one of the briefest careers of any Soviet division. The 400th was never reformed.

== Formation ==
The 400th began forming in August 1941 at Yevlakh, Azerbaijan, in the Transcaucasus Military District. Its order of battle, based on the first wartime shtat (table of organization and equipment) for rifle divisions, was as follows:

- 829th Rifle Regiment
- 832nd Rifle Regiment
- 834th Rifle Regiment
- 959th Artillery Regiment
- 181st Antitank Battalion
- 187th Antiaircraft Battery (later 683rd Antiaircraft Battalion)
- 681st Mortar Battalion
- 458th Reconnaissance Company
- 677th Sapper Battalion
- 847th Signal Battalion
- 481st Medical/Sanitation Battalion
- 474th Chemical Protection (Anti-gas) Company
- 511th Motor Transport Company
- 246th Field Bakery
- 821st Divisional Veterinary Hospital
- 1454th Field Postal Station
- 726th Field Office of the State Bank

The division was without a commanding officer until December 21 when Col. Ilya Vasilevich Korchagin was assigned to the position, but after less than a month he was replaced by Col. Yakov Yakovlevich Verbov, who would remain in command for the rest of the division's existence. It was assigned to 44th Army in Transcaucasus Front by the start of October. In November it was transferred to 51st Army, still in the same Front. A strength return for the division in early January, 1942 shows that, almost six months after beginning to form, it had nearly a full complement in personnel, rifles and horses, and had the required number of 122mm howitzers and radios, but was seriously deficient in machine guns, antiaircraft machine guns, medium and heavy mortars (although over strength in light mortars), trucks and tractors, and had no sub-machine guns, antitank guns or antiaircraft guns at all. There is no direct information on whether or not these shortages were made up while the division was in the Crimea.

== Battle of the Kerch Peninsula ==
In late January the 400th crossed into Crimea via the ice road that had been built across the Kerch Strait, and was assigned to 47th Army which was subordinated to the new Crimean Front on January 28. This Army was a second echelon holding formation at the time, indicating that the 400th was not yet considered ready for combat. By April 1 it had returned to 51st Army, which had done most of the fighting in the four offensives conducted by the Front between February 27 and April 11 and had suffered casualties accordingly.

Before the fourth offensive ended the commander of German 11th Army, General Erich von Manstein, began planning an operation to destroy all three armies of Crimean Front in one stroke. Operation Trappenjagd would initially target the 44th Army, which was defending a sector about 6 km (3.7 mi) long with five rifle divisions and two tank brigades. Although defenses in depth had been prepared, almost all the rifle units were deployed within 3 km (1.9 mi) of the front line. When the attack began on May 8 German airstrikes quickly achieved air superiority and a 10-minute artillery preparation on the first-line divisions of the Army began at 0415 hours. Meanwhile, a flotilla of assault boats landed a German force 1,500m behind the anti-tank ditch across the Parpach Narrows to disrupt the second echelon defenses. Overnight the ditch was bridged, and late on the 9th Manstein was able to commit the 22nd Panzer Division which by the middle of the next day reached the Sea of Azov, cutting off the 51st Army as well as the remnants of the 44th. The 400th was caught up in this mayhem and while some of its men were among the approximately 50,000 evacuated from Crimea to the Taman Peninsula, most were killed or captured and the division was officially disbanded just a few weeks later on June 14.
