= Kondrat Melnik =

Soviet Army lieutenant general

Kondrat Semyonovich Melnik
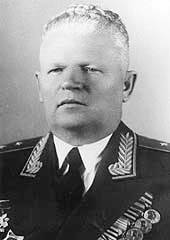
- Born: 25 March [O.S. 13 March] 1900; Ivankov, Radomyslsky Uyezd, Kiev Governorate, Russian Empire
- Died: 3 May 1971 (aged 71); Moscow
- Military career
- Allegiance: Russian SFSR; Soviet Union
- Branch: Red Army
- Service years: 1919–1961
- Rank: General-leytenant
- Commands: 30th Cavalry Division; 53rd Cavalry Division (became 4th Guards Cavalry Division); 15th Cavalry Corps; 44th Army; 58th Army; 56th Army; Separate Coastal Army; Taurida Military District
- Conflicts: Russian Civil War; Polish–Soviet War; Battle of Lake Khasan; World War II
- Awards: Order of Lenin; Order of the Red Banner (3); Order of Suvorov, 1st class

Kondrat Semyonovich Melnik (25 March 1900 – 3 May 1971) was a Soviet Army general-leytenant who rose to army command during World War II.

== Early life and Russian Civil War ==
A Ukrainian, Kondrat Semyonovich Melnik was born on 25 March 1900 in the town of Ivankov, Ivankovsky volost, Radomysl Uyezd, Kiev Governorate. During the Russian Civil War, Melnik joined the Red Army in March 1919 and was sent to the 20th Soviet Regiment as a Red Army man. As part of the 12th Army, the regiment fought on the Southwestern Front. From January to May 1920 he was on sick leave, then served in the 2nd Separate Cavalry Squadron as a Red Army man, platoon commander, assistant commander and commander of a squadron. With this unit he fought in the Polish-Soviet War in 1920, and against the Ukrainian nationalist detachments of Marusa, Orlik, Zelyony, Bogatyrenko and others.

== Interwar period ==
After the end of the war, Melnik served in the 8th Red Cossack Cavalry Regiment of the 2nd Cavalry Division from October 1921, serving as assistant commander and commander of a squadron. From February 1923 he commanded a squadron of the 5th Litinsk Red Cossack Regiment, from May 1924 was squadron commander and acting assistant commander for personnel of the 6th Lubny Cavalry Regiment (later renamed the 8th Cavalry Regiment of the 2nd Cavalry Division). From October 1925 to September 1926 he studied at the Cavalry Command Personnel Improvement Courses, returning to the 8th Red Cossack Cavalry Regiment upon graduation. He continued to serve with the unit as chief of the regimental school, acting regimental chief of staff, acting assistant regimental commander for supply, again as chief of the regimental school, and as acting commander and chief of staff of the regiment.

From August 1929 he was chief of staff of the 7th Cavalry Regiment of the 2nd Cavalry Division. From June 1930 he studied at the Frunze Military Academy, and on graduation in May 1933 was appointed chief of staff of the 4th Separate Cavalry Brigade. In April 1935 the brigade was expanded into the 16th Separate Cavalry Division, and Melnik continued as its chief of staff. In July 1937 he became commander of the 30th Cavalry Division of the Leningrad Military District, and from December of that year served as military commandant of Leningrad. In July 1938 he was appointed deputy chief of staff of the Far Eastern Front, in this position he took part in the Battle of Lake Khasan. From September 1939 to July 1939 Melnik was chief of staff of the 2nd Separate Red Banner Army. Then he was sent to the Frunze Military Academy, where he served as a senior instructor in the staff service and cavalry tactics departments.

== World War II ==
At the beginning of the war in July 1941, then-Kombrig Melnik was appointed commander of the 53rd Separate Cavalry Division, which as part of the 29th and 16th Armies of the Western Front took part in the Battle of Smolensk and the Battle of Moscow. In September the division, operating as part of the cavalry group of Lev Dovator, conducted a two-week raid into the German rear, then fought in intense defensive battles near Moscow. The division was reorganized as the elite 4th Guards Cavalry Division in October. In January and February 1942 Melnik temporarily commanded the 2nd Guards Cavalry Corps, and in March took command of the 15th Cavalry Corps of the Transcaucasus Front, stationed in Iran.

In October 1942 then-Major General Melnik was appointed commander of the 44th Army of the Northern Group of Forces of the Transcaucasus Front. He led the army in sustained fighting from the mouth of the Terek to Gudermes. Melnik was transferred to command the front's 58th Army in November. During December he led the army in defensive battles on the line of Mozdok and Verkhny Kurp, simultaneously defending the Makhachkala area with one rifle division. In January 1943 the army took part in the Northern Group of Forces’ drive on Stavropol and liberated Mozdok and Malgobek. Continuing the offensive in the general direction of Prokhladny and Mineralnye Vody, the army reached the Sea of Azov coast in early February, where it went on the defensive. In February and March Melnik led the army in the Krasnodar offensive, conducting the main attack of the front from the north. From April, the army defended the coast of the Sea of Azov from Margartovka to Achuyev. On 28 April Melnik was promoted to lieutenant general. In October the army headquarters was used to form that of the Volga Military District, and Melnik appointed commander of the 56th Army.

As part of the North Caucasus Front, the army took part in the Novorossiysk–Taman offensive, ending the Battle of the Caucasus. Melnik's command performance evaluation read:

Commanding the forces of the army, Melnik showed himself to be thoroughly prepared to be a general. In battle he was courageous and decisive, urgently carrying out orders and instructions. He displays correct initiative in his operations. In operational and tactical terms he is well prepared. He excellently organizes the coordination of different branches. He possesses brilliant organizational skills and command qualities.

From November 1943 he served as deputy commander, and then from April 1944 as commander of the Separate Coastal Army. Under his command, the army successfully operated in the fighting in the North Caucasus and in the liberation of Crimea. Afterwards, the army defended the Crimean coast until the end of the war.

== Postwar ==
After the war, Melnik commanded the Taurida Military District from July 1945, and from July 1946 was district deputy commander, and in February 1947 became chief of staff and first deputy commander of the district. From December 1951 he was at the disposal of the 10th Directorate of the General Staff, and from March 1952 was head military advisor to the Romanian Army, and military attache at the Soviet embassy in Romania. In October 1953 he was replaced and in April 1954 sent to DOSAAF, where he served as deputy chairman of the DOSAAF Central Committee. In March 1958 he was placed at the disposal of the Ministry of Defense and in June appointed chief of the Main Paramilitary Training Directorate, responsible for reserve training. In April 1961 he retired. Melnik died on 3 May 1971 in Moscow.

== Decorations ==
Melnik was a recipient of the following decorations:

- Order of Lenin
- Order of the Red Banner (3)
- Order of Suvorov 1st class
- Order of Kutuzov, 2nd class
- Order of the Patriotic War, 1st class
- Medals
