= North Caucasus Front =

- Active: May 20, 1942 - September 1, 1942; January 24, 1943 - November 20, 1943
- Country: Soviet Union
- Branch: Red Army
- Type: Army Group Command
- Size: Several Armies
- Engagements: World War II; Battle of the Caucasus; Kerch–Eltigen Operation

Commanders
- Notable commanders: Semyon Budyonny; Ivan Maslennikov; Ivan Yefimovich Petrov

The North Caucasus Front, also translated as North Caucasian Front, was a major formation of the Red Army during the Second World War.

The North Caucasus Front describes either of two distinct organizations during the war.

== First Creation ==
The first formation was created on May 20, 1942 and was commanded by Marshal Semyon M. Budenny throughout its existence.

The Front incorporated forces from the (disbanded) Crimean Front and received additional forces from the (disbanded) Southern Front on July 28, 1942. The Front was composed of

- 44th Soviet Army (Andrei Khryashchev and Ivan Yefimovich Petrov),
- 47th Soviet Army (Grigory Kotov),
- 51st Soviet Army (Nikolai Kirichenko and Trofim Kolomiets).

The 1st Rifle Corps reappeared in the Soviet OOB on 1 June 1942, directly subordinated to the North Caucasus Front, and was made up of four rifle brigades. The North Caucasus Front at different times also included the 9th, 12th, 18th, 24th, 37th, 56th Army, 4th and 5th Air Army.

The Front also had operational control over

- the Sevastopol Defence Region,
- the Separate Coastal Army (Ivan Yefimovich Petrov),
- the Black Sea Fleet,
- the Azov Flotilla.

The task of the North Caucasus Front was to keep the Sevastopol defensive area and to defend the border of the Don River and the coasts of the Black and Azov Seas.

The isolated city of Sebastopol fell on July 4, 1942. From July 25 to August 5, 1942, the front troops fought heavy defensive battles in the lower reaches of the Don, and then in the Stavropol and Krasnodar area's. In August–September 1942, the front troops conducted the Armavir-Maikop and Novorossiysk operations, but were unable to prevent the enemy from breaking in the Caucasus along the Black Sea.

On September 1, 1942 the Front was reorganized as the Black Sea Group of Forces and assigned to the Transcaucasian Front during the German occupation of the Krasnodar Krai.

== Second Creation ==
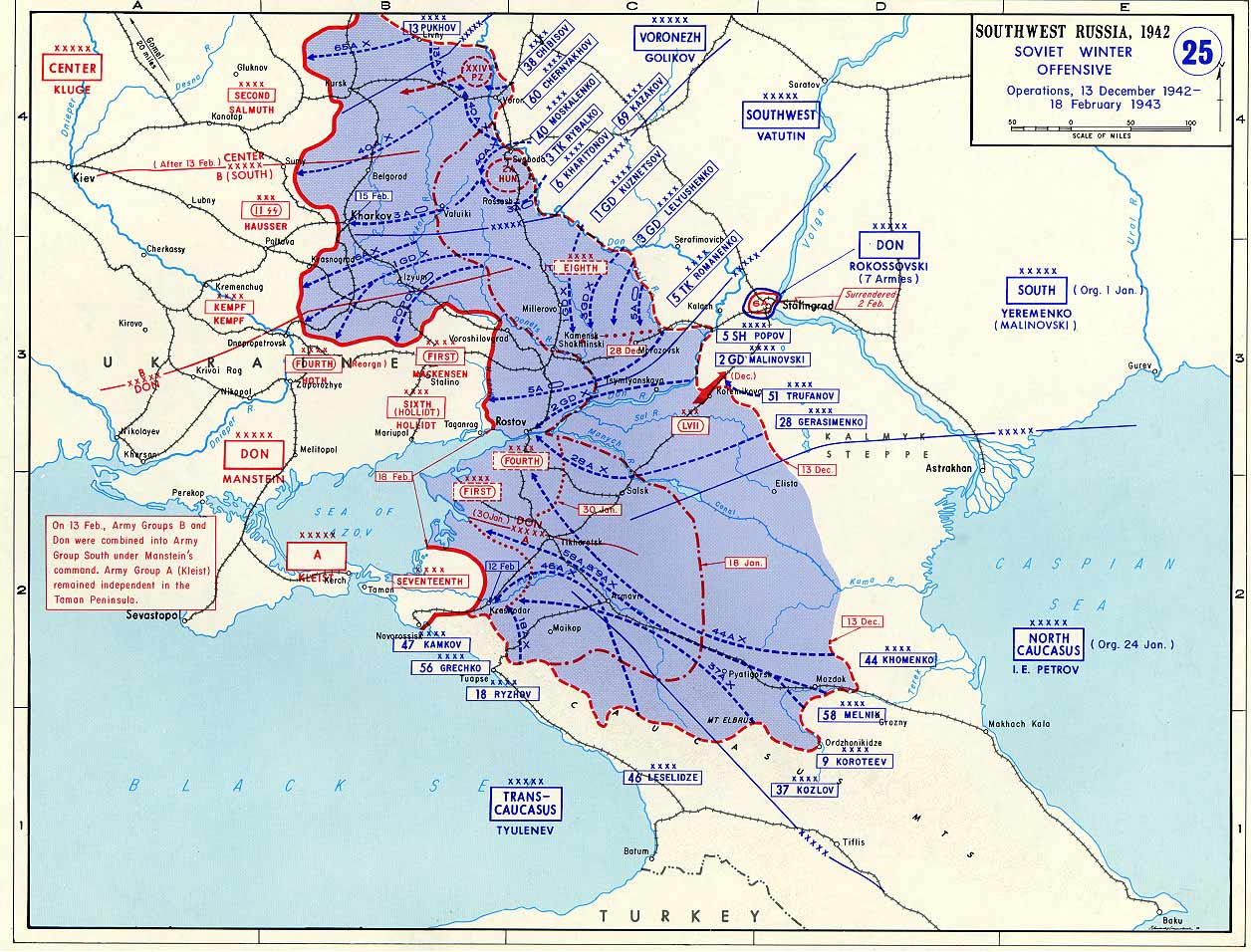
The front from December 1942 to February 1943

.

The second formation of this Front was created on January 24, 1943 from the Northern Group of Forces in the Transcaucasian Front (located in the eastern Caucasus), and reintegrated the Black Sea Group of Forces on February 5, 1943. Lieutenant General Ivan Maslennikov, who was promoted to Colonel General in January 1943, initially took command. He handed over to Lieutenant General Ivan E. Petrov (Russian: Иван Ефремович Петров), in May 1943, and Petrov was then promoted to Colonel General in August.

During the long series of engagements known as the Battle of the Caucasus, the North Caucasian Front included the

- Black Sea Group of Forces consisting of the
  - 46th Army (Konstantin Leselidze),
  - 18th Army (Alexander Ryzhov),
  - 47th Army (Fyodor Kamkov),
  - 56th Army (Andrei Grechko),
  - 5th Air Army (Sergei Goryunov),
  - 13th Separate Rifle Corps
  - 16th Separate Rifle Corps.
- The Northern Group of Forces commanded the
  - 37th Army (Pyotr Kozlov,
  - 9th Army (Konstantin Koroteev),
  - 58th Army (Kondrat Melnik),
  - 44th Army (Vasily Khomenko),
  - 4th Air Army (Nikolai Naumenko),
  - 10th Separate Rifle Corps.

Additionally it commanded the Black Sea Fleet and the Baku Army of PVO.

The fighting remained reasonably static from February until September 1943 when the Germans ordered fresh withdrawals from the Kuban bridgehead, which effectively ended the period of fighting in the Caucasus. The Front was reorganized into the Separate Coastal Army on November 20, 1943 during the Kerch-Eltigen Operation, the Soviet amphibious crossing of the Sea of Azov.

== Sources ==
- Kursk Order of Battle
