= Separate Coastal Army =

- Приморская армия
- Active: August 10, 1941 – July 7, 1942 (1st Formation); November 15, 1943 – August 1945 (2nd Formation)
- Country: Soviet Union
- Branch: Red Army
- Type: Combined Arms Army
- Role: Field Army
- Size: Varies
- Engagements: World War II; Siege of Odessa; Siege of Sevastopol; Kerch–Eltigen operation; Crimean offensive

Commanders
- Notable commanders: Andrey Yeryomenko; Ivan Petrov; Nikandr Chibisov

The Separate Coastal Army (Russian: Приморская армия), also translated to English as Independent Coastal Army, was an army-level unit in the Red Army that fought in World War II. It was established on July 18, 1941, by the order of the Southern Front from the forces of 9th Army’s Coastal Group and was stood up on July 20, 1941.

== 1st formation ==
=== Odessa ===
At the beginning of the war the Soviet 9th Army was engaged in heavy fighting along the southern front of the Axis invasion of Southern Russia, retreating towards Odessa. On August 5, 1941 Stavka ordered the Coastal Army to defend the city of Odessa as long as possible. The army established a defense on the approaches to the city and engaged the Fourth Romanian Army, who was advancing towards the city, beginning August 10, 1941.

On August 1, 1941, the Coastal Army comprised the 14th Rifle Corps, consisting of two Rifle Divisions, and miscellaneous units. On August 20, 1941 STAVKA reassigned the Army from the Southern Front to STAVKA’s direct subordination.

In early September 1941, the commander of the Coastal Army asked Moscow to allocate a regular rifle division number to the ad-hoc Odessa Rifle Division. James F. Goff wrote that "..The Commissariat of Defense ordered it to be numbered 421st, because all lower numbers had already been assigned."

The Axis forces assigned 17 infantry divisions and 7 brigades to assault the city. By September 21, 1941, Soviet forces had stopped the German offensive 8–15 km from the city. For the next two months the Coastal Army, reinforced by the 157th Rifle Division and other forces, pinned down 20 Axis divisions. Finally, because of the threat of the German Army Group South breaking through into the Donbas and Crimea, it was decided to evacuate the Odessa Defense Region, including the Coastal Army, into the Crimea. The Black Sea Fleet accomplished this task on the night of October 14–15, 1941.

Order of Battle as of 19 November 1941

- 25th Rifle Division
- 95th Rifle Division
- 1st Odessa Cavalry Division (seemingly an irregular formation)
- 82nd Fortified Region
- 265th Corps Artillery Regiment
- 26th, 175th and 504th AA Battalions
- 69th Fighter Aviation Regiment

=== Sevastopol ===
After evacuating Odessa in October 1941 the Army was assigned to defend the Crimea. In the second half of October the Germany 11th Army and Romanian Army broke through into the plains of Crimea. The Separate Coastal Army retreated towards Sevastopol ahead of the Axis forces.

On November 4, the Crimean defense forces formed the Sevastopol Defense District. On November 19, the Coastal Army joined the Sevastopol defenses. When the army joined the Defense District the army was composed of the following units.

Order of Battle as of 19 November 1941

- 25th Rifle Division
- 95th Rifle Division
- 172nd Rifle Division
- 421st Rifle Division
- 2nd Cavalry Division
- 40th Cavalry Division
- 42nd Cavalry Division
- 7th Naval Rifle Brigade
- 8th Naval Rifle Brigade
- 81st Separate Tank Battalion
- Several other miscellaneous units

On October 20, the Army and the Sevastopol Defense District are reassigned to the Transcaucasus Front, on December 30, to the Caucasian Front, on January 28, 1942 to the Crimean Front, on April 26, under the direct supervision of the Commander in Chief of the Southwest Direction. On May 20, the Coastal Army is listed as being under the command of the North Caucasian Front.

For eight months the Coastal Army along with the other forces of the Sevastopol Defense District held off numerous attacks by German and Romanian forces, causing large casualties and contributing to the difficulty in the Axis attempt to capture the Caucasus. On June 30, Axis forces succeeded in breaking through the Sevastopol defenses, which resulted in a crisis for the Soviet forces. On July 1, 1942 the STAVKA ordered the evacuation of the Crimea to the Caucasus. On July 7, after elements of the army evacuate to the Caucasus, the Coastal Army disbands, and its formations and units transferred to other armies.

Order of Battle as of 1 May 1942

- 25th Rifle Division
- 95th Rifle Division
- 109th Rifle Division
- 172nd Rifle Division
- 345th Rifle Division
- 388th Rifle Division
- 40th Cavalry Division
- 7th Naval Rifle Brigade
- 8th Naval Rifle Brigade
- 79th Naval Rifle Brigade

Order of Battle as of 1 July 1942

- 25th Rifle Division
- 51st Rifle Division
- 150th Rifle Division
- 388th Rifle Division
- 256th Corps Artillery Regiment
- 69th Fighter Regiment (VVS)
- Other miscellaneous units

=== Commanders ===
- Major-General Nikandr Chibisov (July 1941)
- Lieutenant General Georgy Sofronov (July - October 1941)
- Major-General Ivan Petrov (October 1941 - July 1942)

Members of the Military Council:

- Divisional Commissioner Fedor Nedor Voronin (July–August 1941)
- Brigadier Commissioner M. Kuznetsov (August 1941 - July 1942)

Chief of Staff:

- Major-General Gaberial Danilovich Shishenin (July–August 1941)
- Colonel Nikolai Ivanovich Krylov (August 1941-July 1942)

== 2nd formation ==
=== Assault on Kerch and Consolidation of Forces ===
On November 15, 1943 the Stavka ordered the Coastal army reformed, from command elements of the North Caucasian Front, assigned troops from the 56th Army, and to be the assault army in Kerch–Eltigen Operation to establish a bridgehead on the Crimean peninsula. By November 20, the 11th Guards Rifle Corps and 16th Rifle Corps were located in the Kerch bridgehead with the remaining troops of the army were located on the Taman Peninsula. Even before the army was able to expand the Kerch springboard it received orders to prepare an offensive to liberate Crimea.

From late November 1943 until January 1944 the army conducted three separate operations (including the landing at Cape Tarkhan), resulting in the expansion of their bridgehead and improving its operational positions. From February to early April 1944, they held on to their occupied position, improved the engineering of them and conducted training for offensive operations.

Order of Battle January 1, 1944

- 11th Guards Rifle Corps
  - 2nd Guards Rifle Division
  - 32nd Guards Rifle Division
  - 55th Guards Rifle Division
- 16th Rifle Corps
  - 227th Rifle Division
  - 339th Rifle Division
  - 383rd Rifle Division
- 89th Rifle Division
- 128th Guards Mountain Rifle Division
- 414th Rifle Division

=== Recapture of Crimea ===
In April and May 1944 the Coastal Army participated in Crimean Offensive. In the beginning of the offensive the army defeated the rearguard of the enemy north of Kerch. On April 11, together with the ships and aircraft of the Black Sea Fleet and with the support of the 4th Air Army, liberated Kerch. The next day the army captured the Ak-Monay position – the last fortified line of defense of the German army on the Kerch Peninsula. On April 13, the army liberated the city of Feodosia and with the assistance of Crimean partisan – Stary Krym and Karasubazar (Bilohirsk). Continuing to pursue the enemy, they liberated Sudak (April 15) with the assistance of forces of the 4th Ukrainian Front, and with the assistance of partisans – Alushta and Yalta (April 16). By the end of April 16, the army had reached the fortified positions of the Germans at Sevastopol.

Reassigned on April 18, to the 4th Ukrainian Front the army spent from then until May 7, preparing its troops to storm the enemy fortifications at Sevastopol. On May 7, the Coastal Army in conjunction with the 2nd Guards and 51st Armies, and supported by the Black Sea Fleet began the assault on the defenses of Sevastopol. The main forces of the coastal army assaulted in the direction of Cape Chersonese, where the enemy had concentrated the remnant of the German division and all available artillery. By noon on May 12, the army in conjunction with the 19th Tank Corps cleared Chersonese of enemy forces.

Order of Battle January 1, 1944

- 11th Guards Rifle Corps
  - 2nd Guards Rifle Division
  - 32nd Guards Rifle Division
  - 414th Rifle Division
- 16th Rifle Corps
  - 339th Rifle Division
  - 383rd Rifle Division
- 20th Rifle Corps
  - 55th Guards Rifle Division
  - 89th Rifle Division
  - 227th Rifle Division

On May 20, 1944 the Coastal Army transferred from the 4th Ukrainian Front and to the direct subordination of STAVKA. The army remained in the Crimea for the remainder of the war with the mission of defending the coast of Crimea.

In late July 1945 the headquarters of the Coastal and the 22nd Armies were used to form the Tauric Military District.

=== Commanders ===
- Army General Ivan Petrov (November 1943–February 1944)
- Army General Andrey Yeryomenko (February–April 1944)
- Lieutenant General Kondrat Melnik (April 1944–after May 1945)

Members of the Military Council:

- Colonel Evdokim Ye Maltsev (November–December 1943)
- Major General Peter M. Solomko (December 1943–after May 1945)

Chief of Staff:

- Lieutenant-General Ivan Andrevich Laskin (November - December 1943)
- Major General Serafim Evgenievich Christmas (December 1943 - January 1944)
- Major General Pavel Mikhailovich Kotov-Lightly (January - May 1944)
- Lt. Gen. Stephan Ivanovich Lubarsky (May - November 1944)
- Maj. Gen. Semen Semenovich Epanechnikov (November 1944 - until the end of the war)
