= 56th Army (Soviet Union) =

- 56-я армия
- Active: October 1941 – November 1943
- Country: Soviet Union
- Allegiance: Red Army
- Branch: Infantry
- Type: Combined arms
- Size: Field army

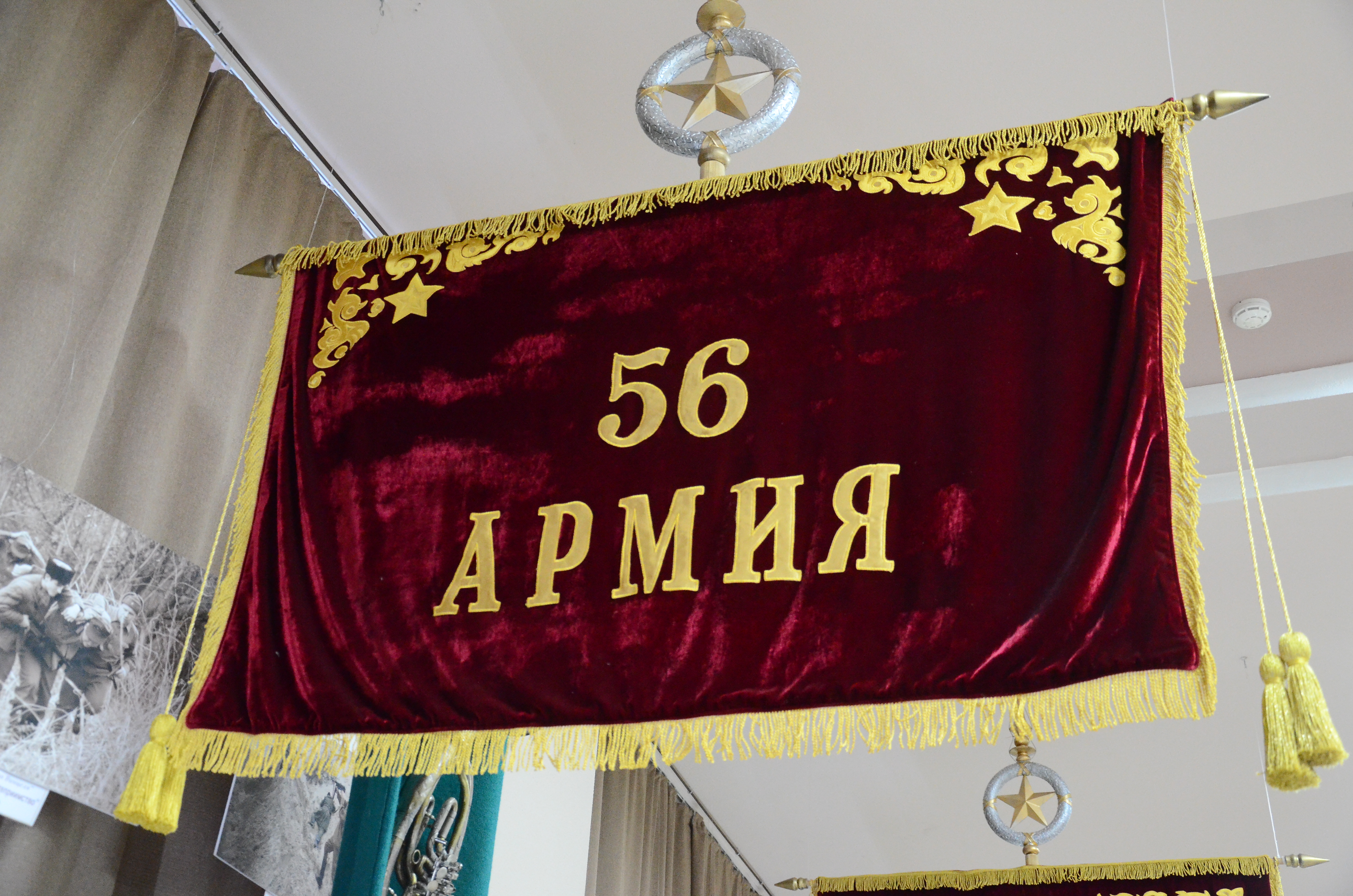
Krasnodar. Park of Culture and Recreation named after the 30th Anniversary of Victory

The 56th Army (Russian: 56-я армия) was a field army of the Soviet Union's Red Army that was created in 1941, and then disbanded to create the second formation of the Separate Coastal Army in 1943. The 56th Army was employed by the Soviets in the struggle against Germany during World War II.

== History ==
The 56th Army was formed in October 1941 and subordinated to the North Caucasus Military District. Subordinated to the Southern Front (Soviet Union) in December 1941, the 56th Army was made up of the following units, as well as five regiments of artillery and a rocket-launcher regiment:

- 31st Rifle Division
- 106th Rifle Division
- 343rd Rifle Division
- 347th Rifle Division
- 353rd Rifle Division
- 11th Rifle Brigade
- 13th Rifle Brigade
- 16th Rifle Brigade
- 78th Rifle Brigade
- 33rd NKVD Motorized Rifle Regiment
- 62nd Cavalry Division
- 64th Cavalry Division
- 70th Cavalry Division
- "NO" Cavalry Division
- 54th Tank Brigade
- 8th Tank Battalion

In January 1942 the army comprised the 31st, 106th, 343rd, and 347th Rifle Divisions, the 13th and 16th Rifle Brigades, the Rostov Separate Rifle Regiment of the People's Militia, and the 62nd, 64th, 70th Cavalry Divisions.

Among prominent actions, the 56th Army successfully fought during the Battle of Rostov in late 1941 and spearheaded the amphibious landings in Crimea in late 1943. The 56th Army was disbanded in November 1943 to create the second formation of the Separate Coastal Army.

== Commanders ==
- Lieutenant General Fyodor Remezov (October 1941–December 1941)
- Major General Viktor Tsyganov (December 1941–July 1942)
- Major General Alexander Ryzhov (July 1942–January 1943)
- Major General (promoted to Lieutenant General April 1943) Andrei Grechko (January–October 1943)
- Lieutenant General Kondrat Melnik (October–November 1943)
