= 44th Army (Soviet Union) =

- 44-я армия
- Active: 1941–1943
- Country: Soviet Union
- Branch: Red Army
- Size: Field army
- Engagements: World War II: Anglo-Soviet Invasion of Iran; Battle of the Kerch Peninsula; Battle of the Caucasus; Donbass Strategic Offensive (August 1943)

Commanders
- Notable commanders: Stepan Chernyak; Ivan Yefimovich Petrov

The 44th Army (Russian: 44-я армия) of the Soviet Union's Red Army was an army-level command active during World War II. Initially part of the Transcaucasian Front, its main actions included the Anglo-Soviet invasion of Iran and the Kerch amphibious landings (both in 1941), before being transferred to the Southern Front on 6 February 1943. There it took part in the Rostov, Donbas and Melitopol offensives. The army was disbanded in November 1943 and its units were transferred to other armies.

== History ==
=== Formation and Invasion of Iran ===
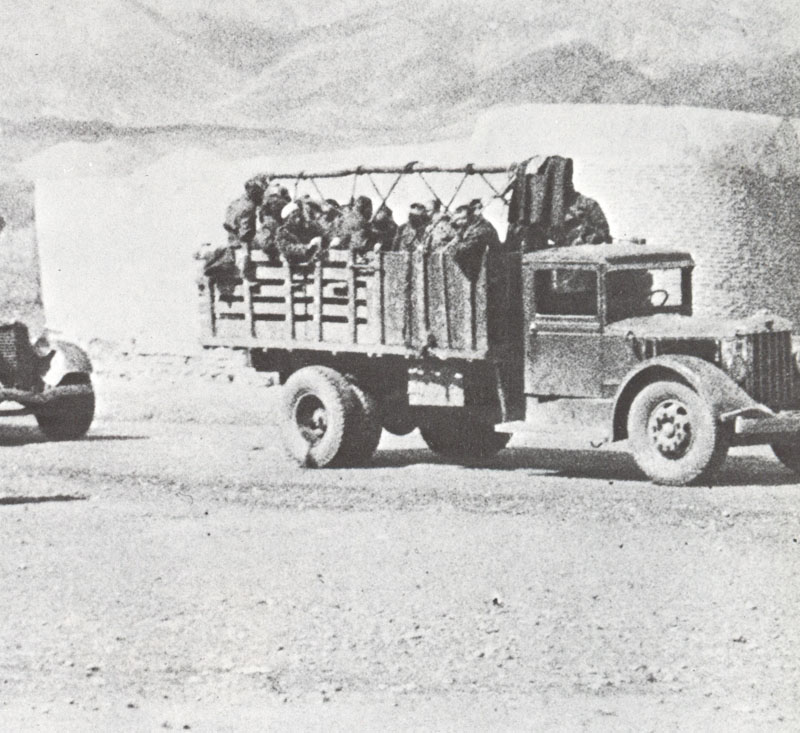
Soviet troops crossing the Iranian border, 25 August 1941

The 44th Army was formed on 1 August 1941 from the 40th Rifle Corps, ostensibly to guard the Soviet-Iranian border in the Transcaucasian Military District. It was composed of the 20th and 77th Mountain Rifle Divisions, as well as the 17th Cavalry Division and other smaller units. Former 40th Rifle Corps commander Major General Alexander Khadeyev became the army's commander. On 23 August, it became part of the Transcaucasian Front. On 25 August, the army began its fighting in the Anglo-Soviet invasion of Iran by crossing the border and moving into Gilan Province. It captured Bandar Pahlavi and Rasht by the next day. By 1 September, the 220th Separate Antiaircraft Artillery Battalion, 36th and 265th Fighter Aviation Regiments and the 205th Separate Sapper Battalion had joined the army.

=== Battle of the Kerch Peninsula ===
In October 1941, the army was relocated from Iran to Makhachkala. In late November, it transferred to the Black Sea coast at Anapa. From 25 December, it fought in the Battle of the Kerch Peninsula under command of Major General Aleksei Pervushin. Along with the 51st Army and units of the Black Sea Fleet, the army helped capture the Kerch Peninsula. It was landed at Feodosiya after the Black Sea Fleet captured the port on 29 December. On 30 December, the army transferred to the Caucasian Front. On 15 January 1942, Pervushin was seriously wounded when an airstrike hit his command post. Major General Ivan Dashichev became acting commander, leading the army during its retreat from advancing German troops. The army suffered heavy losses from the German counterattacks and Dashichev was replaced in command by Major General Serafim Rozhdestvensky on 21 January. He was arrested soon after for "negligence in command" and would eventually serve 10 years in the gulag. The army moved to control of the Crimean Front on 28 January 1942. Rozhdestvensky was replaced in command on 11 February by Lieutenant General Stepan Chernyak. The army launched several unsuccessful attacks during February and April.

On 8 May, German troops launched Operation Trappenjagd (Bustard Hunt). Troops of the XXX Army Corps broke through the front lines of the 44th Army. A German landing behind the main line of resistance unhinged the 44th Army's second echelon. The army's line soon collapsed, and the German troops captured 4,514 prisoners by the end of the day.The army retreated into Kerch and was evacuated to the Taman Peninsula. The army suffered heavy losses during the battle.

=== Battle of the Caucasus ===
On 20 May, the 44th Army became part of the North Caucasian Front and was concentrated in Tikhoretsk. It moved to Makhachkala soon after. On 29 May, Chernyak was relieved of command because of the defeat in Crimea. He was replaced by Major General Andrei Khryashchev. On 16 June, the army was composed of the 138th, 156th, 157th, 236th and 302nd Rifle Divisions, among other units. It was transferred to the Transcaucasian Front. Until August, the army held a defensive line from Gudermes to the mouth of the Terek River. During this time, Khryashcev was replaced in command by Major General Ivan Yefimovich Petrov. On 9 August, the army became part of the front's Northern Group of Forces. During the fall of 1942, it fought in defensive battles in the Caucasus. On 10 October, Petrov was promoted to command the front's Black Sea Group of Forces and was replaced by Major General Kondrat Melnik. In November, Melnik was transferred to command the 58th Army and was replaced by Lieutenant General Vasily Khomenko. In December, the army pushed German troops back to positions north of Mozdok during a series of counterattacks.

=== 1943 ===
During January 1943, the army attacked towards Stavropol during the North Caucasian Strategic Offensive. It captured Stavropol on 21 January. On 24 January, it became part of the reformation of the North Caucasian Front. The army transferred to the Southern Front on 6 February. It continued the advance and captured Azov on 7 February. By 18 February, the army reached the line of Ryasnyi on the left bank of the Sambek River, east of Taganrog. The army held the line until the beginning of the Donbass Strategic Offensive in August. During the offensive, the army helped capture Taganrog on 30 August. Along with units of the Black Sea Fleet, the 44th Army captured Mariupol on 10 September. From 26 September, it fought in the Melitopol Offensive. At the end of October, the army was placed in reserve and regrouped northeast of Kakhovka. The army was soon placed in the line, relieving elements of the 5th Shock Army. It defended the line of Zavadovka, Kakhovka and Britsantsy. Lieutenant General Khomenko and army artillery commander Major General Bobkov mistakenly drove their vehicles into German lines on 9 November and were killed. Stalin feared that the generals had defected to the enemy and disbanded the army. Its units were transferred to other armies.

== Commanders ==
- Major General Alexander Khadeyev (July - December 1941),
- Major General Aleksei Pervushin (December 1941 - January 15, 1942) (wounded in action)
- Major-General Ivan Dashichev (January 16–21, 1942) (arrested due to heavy losses during the withdrawal of the 44th Army),
- Colonel Serafim Rozhdestvensky (January 21 - February 11, 1942),
- Lieutenant General Stepan Chernyak (February 8 - May 29, 1942),
- Major General Andrei Khryashchev (June - July 1942),
- Major General Ivan Yefimovich Petrov (August - October 1942),
- Major General Kondrat Melnik (October 1942),
- Major General Grigory Kotov (October–November 1942),
- Lieutenant-General Vasily Khomenko (November 21, 1942 - November 9, 1943); killed in action.
