= Melitopol offensive =

1943 Soviet offensive on the Eastern Front of WW2

- Part of the Eastern Front
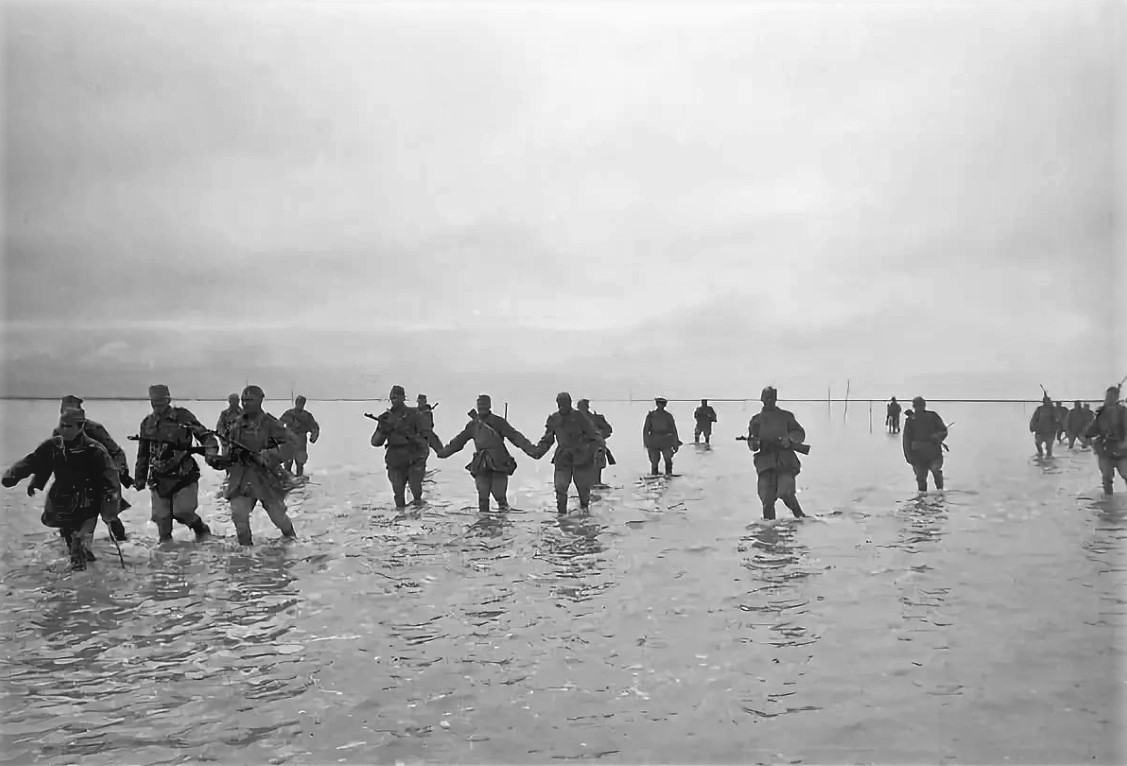
- Soldiers of the 4th Ukrainian Front cross the Sivash Bay into the Crimea
Date	26 September 1943 – 5 November 1943
Location	Ukrainian SSR, Soviet Union
Result	Soviet victory

Belligerents
Soviet Union	Germany; Slovakia

Commanders and leaders
(Soviet Union) Fyodor Tolbukhin	(Nazi Germany) Paul Ludwig Ewald von Kleist

Casualties and losses
43,000 killed, seriously wounded, missing or captured 155,000 wounded	(Nazi Germany) 4,077 killed 16,681 wounded 3,591 missing Unknown captured (Note: 6th Army only between 20 September and 10 November) (Slovak Republic (1939–1945)) Unknown killed Unknown wounded 2,600 captured

The Melitopol offensive was a successful Soviet offensive operation from September 26 to November 5, 1943, during the Second World War, as part of the second stage of the Battle of the Dnieper. It resulted in the liberation of Melitopol and the entire northern coast of the Sea of Azov.

== The operation ==
After the Donbas strategic offensive (August 1943), the troops of the Southern Front (from October 20, 1943 - the 4th Ukrainian Front) had driven back the German 6th Army of Army Group A, behind a pre-prepared line on the Molochna River. This was a 2-3 deep defensive line, part of the Panther–Wotan line, with a developed system of trenches, long-range firing structures, numerous anti-tank and anti-personnel barriers. The main center of defense was the city of Melitopol.

The goal of the Melitopol operation was to break through this line and to access the lower reaches of the Dnieper, cutting off a large German force in the Crimea from the main German Army.

During the offensive, which began on September 26, it was planned to deliver two blows - the main blow with the main forces north of Melitopol (4 armies, 2 tank and 2 cavalry corps) - and a secondary one, by the forces of the 28th Army, from the area south of Melitopol, bypassing the city from the south west.

The offensive was launched with virtually no operational pause at the request of the Headquarters, in order to prevent the enemy from settling on the defensive line. Without proper preparation and reconnaissance, and because of the fatigue of the troops and the depletion of materiel, the Soviet offensive stalled after 5 days with heavy losses, and an advance of only 2–10 km.

From September 30 to October 9, the offensive was temporarily stopped. After a thorough analysis of the situation and finding that Karl-Adolf Hollidt, commander of the German 6th Army was transferring significant forces from his southern flank to the northern, Fyodor Tolbukhin regrouped the main forces in the opposite direction and delivered a massive blow to the weakened enemy grouping. The transfer of troops of the 51st Army, tank and cavalry corps to the zone of the 28th Army made it possible to achieve the greatest success in the southern direction, and two weeks after the resumption of the operation, on October 23, Melitopol was liberated by the 51st Army in cooperation with the troops of the 28th Army. At the same time, the troops advancing north of the city also broke through the defenses and cut the Zaporizhzhia-Melitopol railway line.

A mobile cavalry-mechanized group "Storm" was formed to advance through the gap south of Melitopol, as part of the 4th Guards Kuban Cavalry Corps and 19th Tank Corps, supported by aviation. On October 24, all German troops were forced to begin a general retreat. Pursuing the enemy, on October 30, Soviet troops liberated Henichesk and reached the coast of the Sivash Bay. On November 1, having overcome the Turkish Wall, they gained a foothold in the Perekop Isthmus.

By the night of November 5, the troops reached the lower reaches of the Dnieper and captured a bridgehead on the southern bank of the Sivash Bay.
The advancing troops, however, failed to dislodge the enemy from the last bridgehead he occupied on the left bank of the Dnieper south of Nikopol.

== Results ==
As a result of the operation, the troops of the front had advanced 50–320 km to the west and south-west, liberated almost the entire Northern Taurida and cut off the Crimean group of German troops from land, creating conditions for the upcoming liberation of Crimea and the south of Right-Bank Ukraine.

18 most distinguished units and formations received the honorary titles of Melitopol. For the liberation of the city of Melitopol, 87 soldiers received the title of Hero of the Soviet Union, of which 12 soldiers were born in Melitopol.

== Sources ==
- the article in the Russian Wikipedia, Мелитопольская операция.
