= List of Soviet armies =

An army, besides the generalized meanings of ‘a country's armed forces’ or its ‘land forces’, is a type of formation in militaries of various countries, including the Soviet Union. This article serves a central point of reference for Soviet armies without individual articles, and explains some of the differences between Soviet armies and their U.S. and British counterparts.

During the Russian Civil War, most Soviet armies consisted of independent rifle and cavalry divisions, and corps were rare.

During World War II, Soviet armies included the all-arms (общевойсковые), tank (танковые), air (воздушные), and air-defence (противо-воздушной обороны (ПВО)) armies which included a number of corps, divisions, brigades, regiments and battalions belonging largely to the appropriate branch of the armed forces or of the arm of service, such as the rifle corps. In the emergency of June 1941 it was found that inexperienced commanders had difficulty controlling armies with more than two or three subordinate corps, so several armies were disbanded, to be reformed later in the war. Thus Soviet High Command's (Stavka's) Circular 01, of July 15, 1941, directed several changes to Red Army force structure, including the elimination of rifle corps headquarters and subordination of rifle divisions directly to rifle army headquarters. Following the Second World War, an army was reorganised with four or five divisions, often equivalent to a corps in the militaries of other countries. During a war, an Army of the Soviet military was typically subordinated to a front. In peacetime, an army was usually subordinated to a military district.

== History ==
There were large variations in structure and size. For example, in the October 1944 Battle of Debrecen, the 27th Army was a massive organization with nine rifle divisions, an artillery division, and four attached Romanian infantry divisions. The 40th Army, by comparison, had only five rifle divisions. Both armies were part of the Second Ukrainian Front.

Special titles given to Soviet armies included red banner army, following the award of the Order of the Red Banner and shock army. The famous image of the flag over the Reichstag was of men from the 3rd Shock Army's 150th Rifle Division. In accordance with prewar planning that saw shock armies as special penetration formations, the 1st Shock Army was formed in November–December 1941 to spearhead the December counteroffensive north of Moscow. A total of five shock armies were formed by the winter campaigns of 1942–43, the 2nd (former 26th Army), 3rd, and 4th (the former 27th Army). During the Stalingrad counteroffensive the 5th Shock Army was the last such formation formed. The 2nd Shock Army was reformed three times, most famously after being encircled in the Lyuban operation south of Leningrad, after which its commander, General Andrey Vlasov, went over to the German side.

Armies which distinguished themselves in combat during the Great Patriotic War of 1941–45 often became Guards armies. These included the 8th Guards Army.

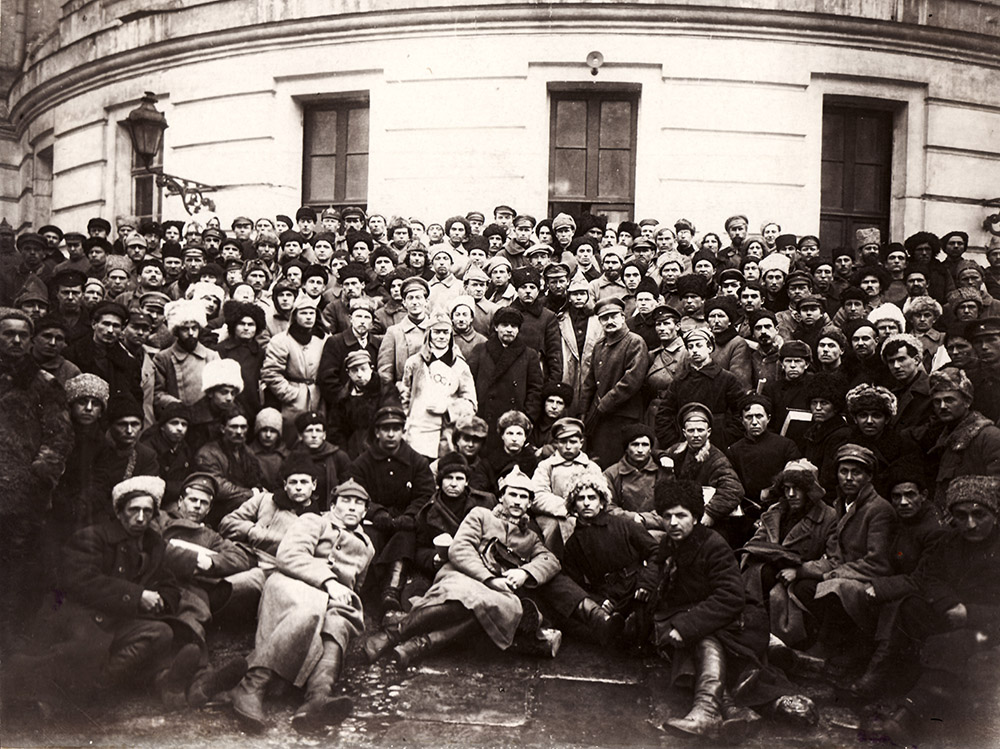
Vladimir Lenin, Leon Trotsky and soldiers of the Red Army in Petrograd

As World War II went on, the complement of supporting units attached to a Soviet army became larger and more complex. By 1945, a Soviet army typically had attached mortar, antitank, anti-aircraft, howitzer, gun–howitzer, rocket launcher, independent tank, self-propelled gun, armored train, flamethrower, and engineer-sapper units. (Note: The 47th Army in January 1945 had nine rifle divisions, a Guards gun-artillery brigade, a rocket launcher regiment, five anti-aircraft regiments, an independent tank regiment, four regiments of self-propelled guns, an armoured train unit, a DUKW truck battalion, an engineer-sapper brigade, and two flamethrower units.) In particular, the ratio of artillery pieces to riflemen increased as the war went on, reflecting the Soviet need for increased firepower as manpower reserves began to decline after staggering infantry losses.

1963 CIA/DIA assessments were already describing combined arms armies as four motor rifle divisions and a tank division, and tank armies as including four tank divisions, in terms of a 'representative wartime organisation used for planning and instructional purposes'. (p. 16/105)

From the Soviet Air Force, air armies were attached to fronts. They were made up of two to three aviation corps. The 16th Air Army was one of the longest serving, and was active until 2009 in the Moscow Military District.

== List of Soviet armies in the Civil War ==
=== Regular armies ===
Army	Notes
1st Army	1st Formation fought in Ukraine, Spring 1918. 2nd Formation fought on the eastern front.
2nd Army	1st Formation fought in Ukraine, Spring 1918. 2nd Formation fought on the eastern front.
3rd Army	1st Formation fought in Ukraine, Spring 1918. 2nd Formation fought on the eastern front. 3rd Formation fought on the western front, 1920.
4th Army	1st Formation fought in Ukraine, Spring 1918. 2nd Formation fought on the eastern front. 3rd Formation fought on the western front, 1920. 4th Formation fought on the southern front, 1920.
5th Army	1st Formation fought in Ukraine, Spring 1918. 2nd Formation fought on the eastern front.
6th Army	1st Formation fought on the Northern Front, south of Archangelsk. 2nd Formation fought on the Southern Front, during the defeat of Wrangel.
7th Army	Defended Petrograd in the Western Front.
8th Army	Fought on the Southern Front.
9th Army	Fought in the Southern, Southeastern, and Caucasian Fronts.
10th Army	Fought in the Southern, Southeastern, and Caucasian Fronts.
11th Army	Formed from the Red Army of the Northern Caucasus and fought in the Southern, Southeastern, and Caucasian Fronts.
12th Army	1st Formation was formed from the Red Army of the Northern Caucasus. 2nd Formation was formed from the 1st & 3rd Ukrainian Red Armies and fought in the Western, Southern, and Southwestern Fronts.
13th Army	First formed from Group Kozhevnikov during Russian Civil War and fought in the Southern, Southwestern, and again Southern Fronts.
14th Army	First formed during the Russian Civil War from the Latvian Red Army and fought on the Western Front.
15th Army	First formed during Russian Civil War from the 2nd Ukrainian Red Army and the Crimean Red Army and fought in the Southern and Southwestern Fronts.
16th Army	First formed during the Russian Civil War from the Lithuanian-Belorussian Red Army and fought on the Western Front.
Red Army of the Northern Caucasus	In the Caucasus, 1918.
Ukrainian Red Army	later divided into 1st-3rd Ukrainian Red Armies.
1st Ukrainian Red Army	Fought west of Kiev/Kyiv, 1919.
2nd Ukrainian Red Army	Fought east of Yekaterinoslav/Katerynoslav, 1919.
3rd Ukrainian Red Army	Fought near Odessa/Odesa, 1919.
Crimean Red Army	In the Crimea, 1919.
Latvian Red Army	In Latvia, 1919.
Lithuanian-Belorussian Red Army	In Lithuania and Belarus, 1919.

=== Cavalry armies ===
Army	Notes
1st Cavalry Army	Formed from the 1st Cavalry Corps. Fought on Southern and South-Western Fronts.
2nd Cavalry Army	

== List of Soviet armies from 1930 ==
=== Combined arms armies ===
There were 79 Combined Arms army headquarters created during the Second World War, with 16 permanently disbanded during the war, and over 20 converted to other army, Front or military district headquarters. After World War II, Soviet armies were known as combined arms armies (obshchevoyskovyye armiyi), sometimes translated during the early Cold War as all-arms armies.

Army	Date formed	Date disbanded	Notes
1st Red Banner Army	July 1938	14 April 1953	Formed in Red Banner Far East MD in July 1938 as 1st Coastal (or Maritime) Army, redesignated finally as 1st Red Banner Army in July 1940. Served with Soviet Far East Front.
2nd Red Banner Army	July 1938	15 December 1945	Served with Soviet Far East Front
3rd Army	1939	July 1945	Destroyed June–July 1941 while serving with Soviet Western Front. Reformed twice, survived the entire war and reorganized as HQ Minsk Military District July 1945.
4th Army	August 1939	1992	Started war as part of Soviet Western Front. HQ 4th Army on 23 July 1941 became HQ, Central Front. Reformed from HQ 34th Army January 1944.
5th Army	1939	Still active	HQ officially disbanded 25 September 1941. Reformed October within the Soviet Far East Front, took part in many operations, including the invasion of Manchuria in the Far East. Still active within the Russian Ground Forces.
6th Army	August 1939	Still active	Part of the Soviet Southwestern Front on the outbreak of war. 10 August 1941 headquarters disbanded. Reformed twice in 1941 and twice again in 1942. Reformed December 1944 and became HQ Voronezh Military District July 1945. Reformed 1952 and disbanded 1997-98. Reformed 2010.
7th Army	1939	1944/5	18 December 1944 headquarters redesignated HQ 9th Guards Army (Other information indicates that 9 Guards Army was formed from HQ Separate Airborne Army in January 1945) Stationed in Austria as part of the Central Group of Forces briefly after the war, in 1946 it comprised three rifle corps totalling nine divisions.
8th Army	October 1939	1945	Formed from the Novgorod army group of the Leningrad Military District in October 1939. Part of Baltic Military District since summer 1940. Survived entire war and disbanded in September 1945 (July?), becoming HQ Western Siberian Military District at Novosibirsk.
9th Army	June 1941	October 1943	Army HQ was formed from the Odessa Military District. In the summer of 1940 it took part in the Soviet occupation of Bessarabia and Northern Bukovina. Started the war in the Odessa Military District, which became Southern Front. HQ disbanded 29 October 1943.
10th Army	1939	1944	Formed in September 1939 in the Moscow Military District and deployed to the Western Special MD. Took part in 1939 invasion of Poland. On June 22, 1941 part of Soviet Western Front. Destroyed by German forces. HQ officially disbanded 5 July 1941. Reformed three times in 1941.
11th Army	1939	December 1943	Part of North-Western Front on outbreak of war. HQ disbanded 18 December 1943.
12th Army	1939	November 1943	Formerly the Southern Cavalry-Mechanized Army Group of the Kiev Special MD. Since the autumn of 1939 at some points the Army was 'known' as the '1st Horse Army', recalling the Civil War glories of that formation. It started the war within Soviet Southwestern Front. HQ disbanded 10 August 1941 after the Army was caught in an encirclement south of Kiev along with the 6th and 18th Armies. Reformed twice in 1941 and reformed again by conversion of previous 5th Tank Army in mid April 1943.
13th Army	April 1941	Circa 1991?	Started World War II with Soviet Western Front. Survived not only entire war, but also entire Cold War up to dissolution of USSR. Still serving with Ukrainian Ground Forces as 13th Army Corps.
14th Army	1939	1953	In World War II, formerly the Murmanskaya Operative Group of the Leningrad Military District. It was upgraded to Army status in October 1939. After the end of Winter War, it remained in the Kola peninsula, coming under the command of the Belomorsky Military District and having two rifle corps. Carried out 1944 Petsamo-Kirkenes Operation under Karelian Front, probably including 45th Rifle Division. 31 July 1945 HQ disbanded and personnel used to fill out HQ, Belomorsky Military District. The Army was re-established in 1948 with 126th Light Mountain Rifle Corps and 1222nd Artillery Regiment. According to some data, there were plans for its use in Chukotka and, in the case of war, landing in Alaska. It was disbanded in 1953 after Stalin's death.
15th Army	1918-19	1993	In World War II, the headquarters was formed in July, 1940 within the Soviet Far East Front on the basis of HQ 20th Rifle Corps. After the end of the war and the completion of the invasion of Manchuria, 15th Army was immediately relocated to Kamchatka and the Kuriles. Its composition after the crushing defeat of Japan was changed substantially. It comprised 2 rifle corps (8 divisions) and two fortified regions.
16th Army	14 July 1941	October 1945	Before Operation Barbarossa, HQ 16th Army was formed in July, 1940 in the Transbaikal Military District (uniting the forces deployed in Dauriya (Даурии). In June, 1941 it was relocated (with six Trans-Baikalian divisions) to Ukraine and subordinated to the Kiev Special MD. HQ disbanded 8 August 1941 after encirclement just west of Smolensk as part of the Western Front. Reformed three times in 1941; under Bagramyan's leadership, the 16th Army performed so well during the February 1943 Bryansk offensive that the Army was redesignated the 11th Guards Army. Later briefly formed in the Far East in 1945.
17th Army	June 1940	October 1945	Formed from the 1st Army Group of the Transbaikal Military District (Lenskii 2001). During the invasion of Manchuria 17th Army included 209th Rifle Division, 278th Rifle Division, 284th Rifle Division, the 70th and 82nd Separate Tank Battalions, and other artillery and tank destroyer units. It ended its existence four months after the end of the war with Japan.
18th Army	25 June 1941	June 1946	The Army HQ was formed from Headquarters Kharkov Military District, and taking six divisions under command, it joined the Southern Front. The Army HQ was destroyed in the Battle of Uman. Reformed, took part in 1943 Kerch-Eltigen Operation. It became after the war a Mountain Army in the territory of the Carpathian Military District and North Bukovina, where it was disbanded in May 1946. Some of its elements were used to form HQ 8 Mechanised Army.
19th Army	2 July 1941	June 1945	The Army HQ was formed from HQ North Caucasus Military District; under instruction from the General Staff it was moved to Cherkassy in Ukraine with five North-Caucasian divisions as the "operative group of the NCMD staff". It was then included in the Main Command reserve. The Army HQ formally disbanded 20 October 1941, after having been wiped out in the Vyazma Pocket, along with various formations under its command, including the 89th Rifle Division, first formation. Reformed three times in 1941, and after the war remained in Poland until 1947, having two Guards Rifle Corps containing six divisions.
20th Army	June 1941	20 October 1941	HQ 20 Army, formed from the Orel MD staff, was moved to Smolensk by 25 June 1941 and brought into the Main Command reserve. The Army HQ was disbanded having been encircled and destroyed in the Vyazma Pocket. Reformed November 1941 for the Battle of Moscow, comprising 331st and 350th Rifle Divisions, and three separate brigades. Fought as part of the Western Front. In 1942-43 it operated on the Rzhev-Sychevka bridgehead, and took part in the Rzhev-Vyazma offensive operation. In 1944 it became part of the Stavka Reserve and was then reassigned to Kalinin Front and Leningrad Front. It was disbanded in April 1944 by being dispersed within the formations of 3rd Baltic Front.
21st Army	2 July 1941	30 July 1945	Formed from HQ Volga Military District, the Army HQ had moved up to Chernigov by 25 June 1941, joining the Main command reserve. HQ awarded 'Guards' status and renumbered to HQ 6th Guards Army on 16 April 1943.
22nd Army	June 1941	2010	Formed from HQ Ural MD, on General Staff instructions the 22nd Army joined the Main command reserve in June 1941. After disbandment HQ personnel were used to form HQ, Tavricheskii Military District in the Crimea. 109th Rifle Corps arrived with the Army HQ. Reformed in 1990s and disbanded 2010 with the Russian Ground Forces.
23rd Army	May 1941	April 1948	Survived the entire war within the Leningrad Military District. Began war in the Northern Front consisting of 19th and 50th Rifle Corps and 10th Mechanised Corps. It was disbanded in April 1948.
24th Army	15 July 1941	1943	The army headquarters, formed from Headquarters Siberian Military District; under General Staff instructions of 25 June 1941 arrived on 28 Jun 1941 at Vyazma, accepting on arrival in this area six Siberian rifle divisions of the high command reserve. Involved in the Yelnya Offensive, August–September 1941. HQ disbanded 10 October 1941, having been destroyed in the Vyazma Pocket. Reformed from 9 December 1941 to 4 January 1942, then redesignated as 1st Reserve Army (II). Reformed again on 20 May 1942, then redesignated as HQ 58th Army (III) on August 28, 1942; Soon afterwards reformed again from 9th Reserve Army and ended up in the Stalingrad area. Then redesignated 4th Guards Army on 16 April 1943 (Glantz, 2005, p. 511), or May 1943 (Perechen)
25th Army	January 1941	1957	Formed in the Soviet Far East Front on the basis of HQ 43rd Rifle Corps (in Primorski Krai). In June 1941 comprised 39th Rifle Corps with 32nd Rifle Division, 40th, and 92nd Rifle Divisions, plus 105th Rifle Division as Army troops. Immediately after the end of the war with Japan it included two rifle corps (6 divisions) and 8 fortified regions, but they were all reorganised in 1946 into machine-gun artillery divisions. Took part in Soviet move into northern Korea immediately after World War II had ended, and was headquartered at Pyongyang for a period. It was situated within what may have been the Maritime Province Military District up to 1955, covering boundary with Korea and China, when it was disbanded.
26th Army	July 1940	1947	HQ formed in July, 1940 in the Kiev Special Military District. The Army HQ was officially disbanded 25 September 1941 after Battle of Kiev (1941). Reformed three times in 1941, on 12 October from 1st Guards Special Rifle Corps and at another point after being redesignated HQ 2nd Shock Army; finally disbanded in Romania in 1947.
27th Army	May 1941	1946	HQ formed in May 1941 in the Baltic Special Military District according to Sovnarkom Decision 23.04.41 No.1113-460ββ. Redesignated HQ, 4th Shock Army on 25 December 1941. Reformed, 27th Army was involved in the Battle of Kiev (1943) and the Battle of Romania (1944).
28th Army	June 1941	1993	The Army headquarters was formed in June 1941 from Headquarters Archangelsk Military District, and was sent south, arriving in high command reserve in the Kirov- Bryansk region by the end of the month.
29th Army	June 1941	1988	Formed from 30th Rifle Corps (I Formation), Joined Soviet Reserve Front on formation. Disbanded 1943, reformed 1970 in Transbaikal and disbanded 1988.
30th Army	13 July 1941	April 1943	Comprised the 119th, 242nd, 243rd and 251st Rifle Divisions, 51st Tank Division, 43rd Corps Artillery Regiment, 533rd and 758th Anti-tank Regiments on formation. Joined Soviet Western Front. Took part in Klin-Solnechegorsk offensive operation, 1941. Redesignated 10th Guards Army 16 April 1943.
31st Army	By 10 July 1941	30 July 1945	Comprised the 244th, 246th, 247th and 249th Rifle Divisions initially (Glantz, Stumbling Colossus). Disbanded summer 1945, became HQ Lvov Military District (1945–46).
32nd Army	June–July 1941	1991	Joined Reserve Front when formed and then eventually Karelian Front. Second Formation established at Semipalatinsk in 1969 on the basis of the 1st Army Corps(?) almost simultaneously with the creation of the Central Asian Military District as a result of the tensions with China. The Army HQ remained in place until 24 September 1981 when it was redesignated 1st Army Corps, and then seven years later 32nd Army was apparently reformed on 27 February 1988. On June 4, 1991, 32nd Army was redesignated 40th Army.
33rd Army	30 July 1941	30 July 1945	On formation joined Reserve Front. Became HQ Smolensk Military District.
34th Army	30 July 1941	15 January 1944	On formation joined Reserve Front. Initially comprised 245th, 257th, 259th, 262nd Rifle Divisions and 25th and 54th Cavalry Divisions. Disbanded to reform HQ 4th Army January 1944.
35th Army	June–July 1941	Still active	Joined Soviet Far East Front on formation. Within Far East Front comprised 35th, 66th, 78th Rifle Divisions and 109th Fortified Region.
36th Army	July 1941	Still active	Formed in the Transbaikal Military District on the basis of 12th Rifle Corps, comprising four rifle divisions. In August 1945, reinforced significantly, took part in the Khingan-Mukden offensive operation, part of the Soviet invasion of Manchuria, as part of the Transbaikal Front.
37th Army	10 August 1941	1946	Encircled along with the 5th, 21st, and 26th Armies during the Battle of Kiev (1941). Served in southern areas of the Russo-German War. Occupied Bulgaria in 1944 and remained there until the end of the war. Renamed 10th Mechanized Army in 1946.
38th Army	4 August 1941	1992	Erickson says Mikhail Kirponos ordered this Army to form to hold the Cherkassy bridgehead, on the basis of 8th Mechanised Corps, keeping General Ryabyshev as commander. Spent much of the Cold War serving as part of the Carpathian Military District. After the fall of the Soviet Union the Army became part of the Ukrainian Ground Forces and was later redesignated the 38th Army Corps. The Army Corps, formerly headquartered at Ivano-Frankovsk, was disbanded in May 2003, and many of its formations reassigned.
39th Army	November 1941	1992	Formed in Archangelsk MD, postwar served in China and disbanded in 1956. Reformed in Mongolia 1970, disbanded 1992.
40th Army	August 1941	1992	Notably served in Afghanistan, 1979 onwards, disbanded after withdrawal from Afghanistan 1989, reformed 1991 from 32nd Army and disbanded 1992.
41st Army	May 1942	Still active	Formed in the Kalinin Front in May 1942 but disbanded in April 1943, its headquarters forming the Reserve Front. Reformed circa 2001? in Siberian Military District.
42nd Army	5 August 1941	Summer 1946	Formed under Lt Gen F.S. Ivanov, consisting of the 291st Rifle Division and the 2nd and 3rd Leningrad Militia Divisions. Ended its existence on the Baltic coast in 1946.
43rd Army	31 July 1941	Summer 1946	Formed from 33rd Rifle Corps (I Formation).
44th Army	1 December 1941	9 Nov. 1943	Formed in Transcaucasus Military District.
45th Army	Between June–August 1941	1945	Formed Transcaucasus Military District. For almost the entire war it was situated in Iran and ended its existence after return to the USSR. Disbanded fall 1945.
46th Army	23 Nov. 1941	Summer 1945	Formed in the Transcaucasus Military District.
47th Army	25 Dec. 1941	1947	Formed Transcaucasus Military District. It was stationed in Halle, Germany until it was disbanded.
48th Army	7 August 1941	September 1945	Formed from Novgorod Operational Group, ended fighting in East Prussia. In July 1945 убыла из Германии в Поволжье/Povolzhe, где на базе ее управления был развернут Казанский округ/Kazan Military District. С ней прибыли 17-я и 194-я СД, а 73-я СД убыла на Северный Кавказ.
49th Army	7 August 1941	July 1945	Initial composition included one mountain and three regular rifle divisions, plus a territorial division. Assigned initially to the Reserve Front, then to the Western Front for the defence of Moscow. In 1943 it took part in the Rzhev-Vyazma (Battles of Rzhev?) and Smolensk offensive operations. In 1944–45, as part of the 2nd Belorussian Front, it took part in the Belorussian Operation. During the Mogilev Offensive, east of Mogilev itself, General Robert Martinek's XXXIX Panzer Corps (made up of the 31st, 12th, 337th and 110th Infantry Divisions) attempted to hold its lines in the face of a ferocious assault by Grishin's 49th Army during which the latter suffered heavy casualties. After Belorussia, East Prussian Offensive, East Pomeranian Offensive, and the Battle of Berlin. The end of the war found the army on the Elbe River in the vicinity of Ludwigslust where it encountered Second Army (United Kingdom). HQ returned in July 1945 from Germany to the Gor'kiy region, where it was reformed as the Gor'kiy Military District. Reformed Stavropol 2010?
50th Army	August 1941	July 1945	Joined Bryansk Front. Took part in Battle of Königsberg in April 1945 where it included the 69th Rifle Corps. Disbanded when it was reorganised as the headquarters of the Eastern Siberian Military District in Irkutsk.
51st Army	August 1941	October 11, 1993	Raised in Crimea. Involved in Battle of the Crimea (1944). Moved during June 1945 from the Baltic States to the Urals with almost all its forces. Headquarters moved without its troops to Sakhalin in the Far East Military District in 1953. Disbanded by being redesignated 68th Army Corps.
52nd Army	25 August 1941	12 June 1946	Took part in Iassy-Kishinev Operation, 1944 and Vistula-Oder Operation. Moved to western Ukraine postwar and renamed 8th Tank Army.
53rd Army	1941	October 1945	First formed for the Anglo-Soviet invasion of Iran and disbanded December 1941. Reformed May 1942 from elements of 34th Army. Transferred to the Far East for the Soviet invasion of Manchuria. Disbanded October 1945.
54th Army	5 September 1941	31 December 1944	Formed from 44th Rifle Corps (I Formation). Fought in the Leningrad–Novgorod Offensive.
55th Army	1 September 1941	25 December 1943	Formed under Leningrad Front, from units in the Slutsk-Kolpino area. Initially comprised 168th, 70th, 90th, 237th Rifle Division and 4th Leningrad Militia Division. Involved in the Battle of Krasny Bor (1943). Combined with 67th Army.
56th Army	17 October 1941	November 1943	Took part in 1943 Kerch-Eltigen Operation in the Black Sea. Disbanded November 1943 with troops used to reform the Separate Coastal Army.
57th Army	10 December 1941	1947	Reformed twice in 1942 having been destroyed. Reformed again in March 1943 from remnants of 3rd Tank Army. On the completion of the war was relocated from Austria to Romania, where it became part of the Southern Group of Forces. It was disbanded together with the Southern Group of Forces in 1947.
58th Army	Nov. 1941	In existence	Formed in the Siberian Military District in November 1941, but then the Army was redesignated the 3rd Tank Army in May 1942. Reestablished within the Kalinin Front in June 1942 but then redesignated the 39th Army in August. It was reformed in the Transcaucasian Front from the 24th Army on August 28, 1942. The Army HQ was reorganised as Headquarters Volga Military District in October 1943. The HQ was reformed in 1995 in the North Caucasus Military District.
59th Army	18 December 1941	July 1945	Took part in Battle of the Bay of Viipuri July 1944. Became headquarters of the Stavropol Military District.
60th Army	5 December 1941	July 1945	Fought at Battle of Kursk. This army's 322nd Rifle Division liberated Auschwitz in January 1945. Became headquarters of the Kuban Military District.
61st Army	9 December 1941	July 1945	It arrived in the North Caucasus from Germany during June 1945 and became the headquarters of the Donskoy Military District.
62nd Army	July 1942	1943	Activated in October 1941 as the 7th Reserve Army, the Army was redesignated the 62nd Army at Stalingrad in July 1942. It included the 13th Guards Rifle Division. It was among the victors of Stalingrad and thus redesignated the Eighth Guards Army.
63rd Army	12 July 1942	February 1944	Formed from 5th Reserve Army. Fought at Battle of Stalingrad and the Operation Uranus for which was reflagged as the 1st Guards Army on 4 November 1942. Second formation was formed from 2nd Reserve Army. From May was part of the Bryansk Front, from 10 October with the Central Front (from 20 October 1943 Belorussian Front).
64th Army	12 July 1942	16 April 1943	Formed from 1st Reserve Army. Involved in Battle of Stalingrad, became 7th Guards Army Apr 43.
65th Army	October 1942	April 1946	4th Tank Army was converted into 65th Army in late October 1942. Involved in the Battle of Stalingrad. Re-converted back into 7th Tank Army in 1946.
66th Army	Aug. 1942	April 1943	Formed from 8th Reserve Army. Became 5th Guards Army. Involved in Battle of Stalingrad.
67th Army	10 October 1942	August 1945	End of the war was guarding the coast of the Baltic States from Tallinn to the south.
68th Army	1 February 1943	5 November 1943	Formed from HQ 57th Army.
69th Army	5 February 1943	July 1945	Formed by the elevation of 18th Guards Rifle Corps to Army status. Commanded by Lt Gen M.I. Kazakov, on the eve of Operation Star in February 1943 the Army comprised the 161st, 180th, 219th and 270th Rifle Divisions, plus smaller formations. The Army was moved without troops from Germany to Transcaucasia in June 1945, where its HQ was reorganised as the HQ of the Baku Military District.
70th Army	February 1943	July 1945	Formed from NKVD border guard troops. On February 5, 1943 this army was designated as the 70th Army with Far-Eastern, Transbaikal, Siberian, Central-Asian, Ural and Stalingrad divisions renamed respectively: 102nd, 106th, 140th, 162nd, 175th and 181st Rifle divisions, a total of 69236 personnel. The 70th Army was formed in Zlatoust and transferred to Konstantin Rokossovsky’s Central Front (Soviet Union), which was preparing a local offensive, and suffered its first defeat. In June 1945 it arrived, possibly just an HQ without any troops, from Germany, in the South Urals, where its HQ was reorganised as the headquarters of the South Urals Military District.
Separate Coastal Army	1941	July 1945	Served in Crimea during 1941 onwards, disbanded, reformed from North Caucasus Front on 20 November 1943 during the Kerch-Eltigen Operation, and served until 1945. Became Tauric Military District Headquarters.

=== Guards armies ===
Army	Date formed	Date disbanded	Notes
1st Guards Army	first formed August 1942	1991–92	Formed first from 2nd Reserve Army. Reformed three times. After the war ended the Army was moved together with a number of its components to Central Asia, where its headquarters during July 1945 became HQ Turkestan Military District. The 306th and 376th Rifle Divisions became mountain-rifle divisions. Active until around 1991–92 or afterwards with the Ukrainian Ground Forces.
2nd Guards Army	October 1942	1945	After the war the Army returned to the Moscow Military District with two guard corps (six divisions). According to Feskov et al., the Army HQ existed only on paper, after the reductions of the 1950s, although it is possible an operations group of several officers was present.
3rd Guards Army	December 1942	1945	All formations of this army (except 76th Rifle Corps with the 287th and 389th Rifle Divisions) were disbanded in the summer of 1945, and the Army HQ was reorganised as part of the Volga Military District.
4th Guards Army	16 April 1943	1947	Redesignation of 24th Army
5th Guards Army	16 April 1943	1947	Redesignation of 66th Army, April 1943. The Army arrived from Austria to the territory of the West Ukraine in 1946–1947, where it was disbanded, in contrast to some its divisions, including of those remaining in Austria (13th Guards MD and 95th Rifle Div). Up to its disbandment it had three guard rifle corps (nine divisions).
6th Guards Army	16 April 1943	1947	Redesignation of 21st Army, early 1943. Disbanded in 1947 while in the Baltic Military District.
7th Guards Army	16 April 1943	1992	Redesignation of 64th Army,
8th Guards Army	16 April 1943	1992	Redesignation of 62nd Army after Battle of Stalingrad.
9th Guards Army	January 1945	1946	David Glantz writes that Sep Airborne Army was formed in October 1944. Thereafter, 9 Gds Army was formed on the basis of 7th Army staff and Sep Airborne Army in December 1944, with 37th, 38th and 39th Guards RDs joining in Hungary in Feb. 1945. Then took part in the Vienna Offensive and Prague Offensive. In the Moscow area in 1946 redesignated HQ Airborne Forces.
10th Guards Army	April 1943	1948	Redesignation of 30th Army, 16 April 1943. In October 1945 the Army was in the Estonian SSR, forming part of the Leningrad Military District and having four Guards Rifle Corps. 7th Guards Rifle Corps (Haapsalu, Estonian SSR); 15th Guards Rifle Corps (Rakvere, Estonian SSR); 19th Guards Rifle Corps (Valga, Estonian SSR); and 41st Guards Rifle Corps. In 6.46 the 15th and 41st Guards Rifle Corps were disbanded. In April 1947, the 7th Guards Rifle Corps was disbanded, followed by the 19th Guards Rifle Corps two months later - divisions were now directly attached to the army. On 30 March 1948 renamed 4th Guards Rifle Corps. Prior to the beginning of the 1950s it was still in Estonia, including within its structure the 1st Machine-Gun Artillery Division (formerly of naval infantry(?)), and several guards divisions - 36th Guards Mechanised Division, which was to become the 8th Guards Motor Rifle Division (confirmed by Holm 2015 as still part of 4 Gv AK), 7, 8, 118, 122nd RD (some of them became brigades).
11th Guards Army	April 1943	1997	Formed from 16th Army on 16 April 1943. Took part in the Orel Offensive (Operation Kutuzov), Briyansk, Gorodok, Operation Bagration, the Gumbinnen Operation and East Prussian Offensive. Ended the war in the Baltic Military District. Disbanded 1997 in the Kaliningrad Special Region (KOR), to form the Ground and Coastal Defence Forces of the Baltic Fleet.
14th Guards Army	1956	1995	Created in the Odessa Military District on the basis of the 10th Budapest Guards Rifle Corps. It included a corps HQ and four motor rifle divisions: 28th, 59th, 86th Guards, 48th, and 180th. Following the end of the Cold War it became entangled in the Transnistria War.
18th Guards Army	1957	1979	Formed postwar, served in Group of Soviet Forces Germany, but withdrawn from Germany in 1979 and later disbanded.
20th Guards Army	1960	Still exists	Formed postwar, served in GSFG; withdrawn in the 1990s to Moscow Military District and now headquartered at Voronezh.

=== Shock armies ===
Army	Date formed	Date disbanded	Notes
1st Shock Army	25/11/1941	1945	Formed from the 19th Army (2nd formation). After the war ended the Army was moved together with a number of its components to Central Asia, where its headquarters during July 1945 became HQ Turkestan Military District. The 306th and 376th Rifle Divisions became mountain-rifle divisions.
2nd Shock Army	25/12/1941	1946	Formed from the 26th Army. Destroyed twice in 1942. Until January 1946 it remained in the northeast of Germany (with HQ at Schwerin), after which in full strength it was returned to the USSR, where its HQ was reorganised as HQ Arkhangel'sk Military District.
3rd Shock Army	25/12/1941	1992	Formed from the 60th Army (1st formation). Traced its history from the 3rd Shock Army of the Second World War. The Shock (Assault) Army was different in composition to other Combined Arms Armies between the 1960s and the 1980s. Title was actually 3rd Red Banner Army, rather than Shock, during Cold War. In the early 1990s the Army included the 7th, 10th, 12th, and 47th Guard Tank Divisions.
4th Shock Army	25/12/1941	1945	Formed from the 27th Army (1st formation) From the Baltic States in the summer of 1945 was directed to North Kazakhstan, where its HQ formed HQ Steppe District. Its 19th Rifle Corps may have been reassigned to combat Ukrainian insurgents in the Kharkov region.
5th Shock Army	9/12/1942	1945-6	Formed from the 10th Reserve Army. Redesignated as HQ South-Eastern Front October 1942, with its forces transferred to 24th Army, reestablished from 63rd Army in November 1942, renamed 3rd Guards Army in December 1942, and that same month reformed from 4th Reserve Army. Part of Group of Soviet Forces in Germany for a time after the end of the war.

=== Tank and mechanised armies ===
Normally made up of two or three tank and mechanised corps. Guards tank armies were made up of a number of Guards tank and mechanised corps.

Army	Date formed	Date disbanded	Notes
1st Guards Tank Army	July 1942	?	Formed from the 38th Army, subsequently badly defeated and disbanded. Reorganised in January–February 1943. Became Guards unit in April 1944.
2nd Tank Army	January–February 1943	?	First activated on the basis of HQ 3rd Reserve Army in Soviet Central Front. Reorganised in Feb-March 1943, but stayed in Central Front. Key formations included 11th and 16th Tank Corps, 11th Guards Tank Brigade, and 60th, 112th, and 194th Rifle Divisions. Awarded Guards title and became 2nd Guards Red Banner Tank Army in November 1944. Postwar, the Army was in the Group of Soviet Forces in Germany for many years.
3rd Guards Tank Army	May 1942	1964	Formed from 58th Army. Encircled and almost totally destroyed in March 1943, redesignated 57th Army in April 1943. Reformed May 1943 and redesignated 3rd Guards Tank Army on May 14, 1945. Known as 3rd Guards Red Banner Mechanized Army in 1946 and headquartered in Luckenwalde, Germany. Redesignated 18th Guards Army in 1957.
4th Tank Army	July 1942	1960	Ceased to exist from December 1942 until July 1943. Achieved Guards status by an order of the NKO dated March, 17th, 1945(Krasnaya Zvezda). From 1946 to 1957 the Army was named 4th Guards Mechanized Army. Renamed 20th Guards Army 1960. After the fall of the Soviet Union 20th Guards Army was withdrawn to Voronezh.
5th Tank Army	June 1942	April 1943	Fought on the Briansk, Voronezh and Southwestern Fronts. Spearheaded the northern pincer of encirclement of German 6th Army during operation Uranus before being converted to 12th Army in April 1943.
5th Guards Tank Army	January - February 1943	1992	'Red Banner' The Army was stationed for the entire postwar period in Belorussia and for almost all those years it included the 8th Guards, 29th and also the 193rd (formerly the 193rd Rifle Division) Tank Divisions.
6th Guards Tank Army	January 1944	1993	'Red Banner' Was in Mongolia for 15 years after the war. The friendship with China of those days and the Nikita Khrushchev military reductions changed the fate of 6th Guards Tank Army, and in 1959 it was relocated to Dnepropetrovsk. Toward the end of the 1980s it retained three Guards Tank Divisions - the 17th, 42nd (the former 42nd Rifle Division) and the 75th (formerly the 75th Rifle Division).
7th Tank Army	1946	1993	'Red Banner' Created in Poland from HQ, 65th Army and in 1947 was brought out into Belorussia. In 1993 the army was redesignated as the 7th Army Corps as part of the Belorussian Army.
8th Order of the Red Star Tank Army	1946	1993	Created in the Carpathian Military District, when elements of the 52nd and 18th Armies were reorganised as the 8th Mechanised Army. Parts of the Army participated in the suppression of the Hungarian Revolution of 1956. The 8th Mechanised Army was redesignated the 8th Tank Army in 1957.
9th Mechanised Army	1946	1947	Formed from 57th Army. Based in Romania and disbanded July 1947.
10th Mechanised Army	1946	1947	Active in SE Europe briefly, formed from 37th Army
Special Mechanized Army	1947	1957	Formed from Southern Group of Forces. Became 1st Separate Army 1957.

=== Reserve armies ===
The Stavka formed ten reserve armies in mid-1942 to bolster the Reserve of the Supreme High Command (RVGK).

Army	Date formed	Date disbanded	Notes
1st Reserve Army	26 April 1942	10 July 1942	Became 64th Army (see above).
2nd Reserve Army	June 1942	?	HQ became basis for 1st Guards Army
3rd Reserve Army	June 1942	?	Bryansk Front. Became 60th Army. HQ became basis for 2nd Tank Army
4th Reserve Army	July 1942	?	Became 38th Army, see above
5th Reserve Army	June 1942	?	Became 63rd Army, see above
6th Reserve Army	June 1942	?	Became 6th Army, see above
7th Reserve Army	June 1942	?	Became 62nd Army for Stalingrad Front
8th Reserve Army	June 1942	?	Became 66th Army, see above
9th Reserve Army	July 1942	?	Became 24th Army, see above
10th Reserve Army	July 1942	?	Became 5th Shock Army, October 1942 had 6th Rifle Division (II Formation) join it

=== People's Militia Army ===
The Leningrad People's Militia Army (Armiya Leningradskogo Narodnogo Opolcheniya) was born mostly from the 168 battalions of "fighters" previously raised to deal with expected saboteurs and parachutists. It reported directly to the commander of the Northern Front. The initial intention was to create an army with seven divisions.

== Operational groups ==
- The Novgorod Army Operational Group was first established on 13 August 1939 by the order No. 0129 of the Chairman of the People's Commissariat for Defence, Marshal of the Soviet Union K.E. Voroshilov. The Group was created for operations in Estonia and Latvia. It became the 8th Army in October 1939 (or 14 September 1939) It had the task of providing security of the Northwestern borders of the USSR. Was reestablished on July 31, 1941, troops from the east and the management of the defense sector (from 23 July 1941) Luga Operational Group. It was part of the 'operational army' from 31 July 1941 to 6 August 1941 when it was redesignated as the 48th Army. Reformed as an operational group of the Volkhov Front under the command of Major General Korovnikov formed on August 16, 1941, bringing together units to the east of Novgorod, including remnants of the 28th Tank Division. Active 16 August 1941 to 15 May 1942. See ru:Новгородская армейская оперативная группа.
- Luga Operational Group (ru:Лужская оперативная группа)
- Neva Operational Group (ru:Невская оперативная группа)
- other operational groups

== See also ==
- Air Army (Soviet Union)
- List of armies of the Soviet Union 1991

== Bibliography ==
- Kursk order of battle.
- John Erickson, The Road to Stalingrad, Weidenfeld & Nicolson, London, 1975
- Feskov et al., The Soviet Army during the Years of the Cold War 1945–91, Tomsk 2004
- Feskov, V.I.; Golikov, V.I.; Kalashnikov, K.A.; Slugin, S.A. (2013). Вооруженные силы СССР после Второй Мировой войны: от Красной Армии к Советской [The Armed Forces of the USSR after World War II: From the Red Army to the Soviet: Part 1 Land Forces] (in Russian). Tomsk: Scientific and Technical Literature Publishing. ISBN 9785895035306. - revised version of 2004 work with many errors corrected.
- David Glantz, Colossus Reborn: The Red Army at War 1941–43, University Press of Kansas, Lawrence, 2005,
- David Glantz, When Titans Clashed, University Press of Kansas, Lawrence, 1995
- Krivosheev, G. F., Soviet Casualties and Combat Losses in the Twentieth Century, Greenhill Books, London, 1997
- Aberjona Press, Slaughterhouse: The Handbook of the Eastern Front, Bedford, PA, 2005 (especially for army HQ raising/disbandment dates)
- http://samsv.narod.ru/Arm/arm.html - (Russian)
