= 392nd Rifle Division =

392nd Rifle Division (August 19, 1941 – 1946)
- Active: 1941 - 1946
- Country: USSR
- Branch: Red Army
- Type: Division
- Role: Infantry
- Engagements: Battle of the Caucasus

Commanders
- Notable commanders: Lt. Col. Mikhail Vasilevich Evstigneev; Col. Isidor Andreevich Silagadze; Maj. Gen. Georgii Ivanovich Kuparadze; Maj. Gen. Ivan Pavlovich Babalashvili

The 392nd Rifle Division was an infantry division of the Red Army, and fought against the German Operation Barbarossa 1941-45. It was formed in August in the Transcaucasus Military District as a Georgian National division. It saw its first action in August, 1942, in the 37th Army and in the course of the final push by the 1st Panzer Army in October it was overrun and nearly destroyed, although it was never actually disbanded. In December what remained was moved to the 45th Army on the border with Turkey where it stayed for the duration of the war.

== Formation ==
The 392nd began forming on August 19, 1941 at Gori, Georgia, in the Transcaucasus Military District, Its order of battle, based on the first wartime shtat (table of organization and equipment) for rifle divisions, was as follows:

- 790th Rifle Regiment
- 802nd Rifle Regiment
- 805th Rifle Regiment
- 955th Artillery Regiment
- 162nd Antitank Battalion
- 183rd Antiaircraft Battery (later 679th Antiaircraft Battalion)
- 677th Mortar Battalion
- 454th Reconnaissance Company
- 673rd Sapper Battalion
- 843rd Signal Battalion (later 344th Signal Company)
- 477th Medical/Sanitation Battalion
- 470th Chemical Protection (Anti-gas) Company
- 507th Motor Transport Company
- 242nd Field Bakery
- 817th Divisional Veterinary Hospital
- 1450th Field Postal Station
- 722nd Field Office of the State Bank

Lt. Col. Mikhail Vasilevich Evstigneev was assigned to command of the division on the day it formed, and he would remain in command until March 3, 1942. Shortly after it began forming its personnel were noted as being mostly Georgian. (In January, 1944 it would be recorded as being 90 percent Georgian.) It spent almost a year in the rear before seeing combat. For most of 1941 it was under command of the 47th Army near the southern borders of the USSR, and for the first half of 1942 it was part of the 46th Army. On March 4 Col. Isidor Andreevich Silagadze took over the division's command.

== Battle of the Caucasus ==
As of July 7, when German Army Group A began its part of Operation Blue, the division was in 46th Army in Transcaucasus Front, where it remained as late as August 1. Over the next two weeks, as the German advance continued into the Caucasus region the division was transferred to the 37th Army and the Front organized a viable defense as reported on August 13:

"While only the 9th and 10th Rifle Brigades had initially defended along the lower course of the Terek River on 1 August, then by 12 August 10th and 9th Rifle Brigades, 389th Rifle Division, 11th Guards Rifle Corps, 151st Rifle Division and 392nd Rifle Division were already defending here."

The Army had pulled back to the Baksan River before the German XXXX Panzer Corps began its drive on Mozdok on August 16. The Army continued to hold this line into early September, now with the 2nd Guards Rifle, 275th, 295th and 392nd Rifle and the 11th NKVD Rifle Divisions. The 37th's mission at this time was to prevent the III Panzer Corps' 23rd Panzer and Romanian 2nd Mountain Divisions from advancing south towards Nalchik.

Meanwhile, having seized Mozdok on August 25, the XXXX Panzer Corps and LII Army Corps crossed the Terek on September 2 with the immediate objective of Malgobek 22km to the southwest and the eventual goal of reaching Ordzhonikidze. This assault would proceed at a relative snail's pace due to terrain and heavy Soviet resistance. On September 23 - 24 the 23rd Panzer advanced southward and captured two towns on the Terek, badly damaging the 295th and 11th NKVD Divisions on the right wing of 37th Army in the process. However, in late September the push on Ordzhonikidze stalled. On October 9 Colonel Silagadze handed his command to Col. Georgy Ivanovich Kuparadze, who would be promoted to major general on November 10. The German offensive was renewed on October 25 in the directions of both Nalchik and Ordzhonikidze, targeting the 37th Army which was the weakest of those in the Northern Caucasus Group and had no armor whatsoever. III Panzer Corps began with a powerful artillery preparation and heavy air strikes which, among other things, hit the Army headquarters, killing many staff officers and destroying its communication system. At 1000 hours the Romanian 2nd Mountain Division attacked at the boundary of the 392nd and 295th Divisions and soon gained 8km, or about half the distance to Nalchik, as the Soviet divisions reeled back to the south and east.

III Panzer Corps continued its rapid advance on October 27 - 28. 2nd Romanian captured Nalchik on the 28th, while also pressing the remnants of the 2nd Guards and 392nd back into the foothills of the Caucasus Mountains. Despite the division's woes, on November 5 the German drive on Ordzhonikidze was stopped on the city's outskirts. It was listed for 1 October and 1 November 1943 in 12th Rifle Corps in the Front reserve, but moved near the end of December, now in 45th Army along the Turkish border.

=== Further service ===
The division would remain on this quiet sector for the duration of the war. On December 7 General Kuparadze was replaced by Lt. Col. Stepan Artimevich Beruchashvili; Kuparadze would serve as commander of the 12th Rifle Corps for the duration and into the postwar. Beruchashvili was replaced by Col. Ilya Omanovich Rasmadze on January 6, 1943, but on March 11 was replaced by Col. Ivan Pavlovich Babalashvili, who would lead the division until the end of the war, being promoted to the rank of major general on April 20, 1945.
