= 12th Rifle Corps =

- Active: November 1922 – January 1923; January 1923 – February 1924; November 1930 – July 1941; November 1942 – May 1992 (12th Army Corps from 1957)
- Country: Soviet Union
- Branch: Red Army (Soviet Army from 1946)
- Type: Infantry

Commanders
- Notable commanders: Jan Lufi

The 12th Rifle Corps (Russian: 12-й стрелковый корпус) was an infantry corps of the Red Army during the interwar period and World War II, formed four times.

The corps headquarters was briefly active between late 1922 and early 1923 as part of the Separate Caucasus Army, and again between early 1923 and early 1924 in Western Siberia. Reformed in 1930 and stationed in the Volga Military District, the corps headquarters moved to the Transbaikal in 1939. There, it was used to form the 36th Army in July 1941.

The corps was again reformed in late 1942 as part of the Transcaucasian Front, spending the war guarding the Soviet–Turkish border. From 1946 it was stationed in the North Caucasus Military District, and briefly became a mountain rifle corps between 1949 and 1954. The last formation of the 12th Rifle Corps became the 12th Army Corps in 1957, and was expanded into the 49th Army in 1992.

== Prewar formations ==
The corps was formed as part of the Separate Caucasus Army with headquarters at Yerevan by an order of 16 November 1922, and included the 3rd Caucasian and Armenian Rifle Divisions. It was disbanded by orders of the army of 15 January and 1 February 1923.

The 12th Rifle Corps was again formed as part of the Western Siberian Military District by an order of 30 January 1923 with headquarters at Novonikolayevsk. It included the 26th and 35th Rifle Divisions and fought in the suppression of the Yakut revolt between January and December. Kasyan Chaykovsky commanded it between January and September. The corps was disbanded by an order of the district of 14 February 1924.

The 12th Rifle Corps was formed for a third time as part of the Volga Military District by an order of 28 November 1930, headquartered at Saratov at the former headquarters building of the 16th Rifle Corps. Its formation was completed by 22 January 1931, when the corps headquarters issued its first order; the corps initially included the 31st (Stalingrad) and 32nd (Saratov) Rifle Divisions. Georgy Sofronov began the formation of the corps, but was transferred to another unit in December 1930; the formation of the corps was completed by Semyon Turovsky, who commanded it from 9 January 1931. The corps commander also oversaw the XII Corps District, formed to facilitate wartime mobilization in Lower Volga Krai, which controlled the local military commissariats.

Major unit headquarters locations, 1931–1932

The corps began forming the 53rd (Pugachyov) and 61st (Balashov) Territorial Rifle Divisions during September 1931, along with the Saratov-based 12th Artillery Regiment, 12th Separate Communications Battalion, and 12th Separate Sapper Battalion, and the corps artillery range at Tatishchevo. These units comprised locals residing closest to their bases, and were fully formed by 31 December. Turovsky transferred on 11 February 1932, being replaced by Ivan Tkachev. The corps training center opened in May, ultimately graduating four classes of reserve officers and holding five territorial training camps. During 1933, the 53rd and 61st Divisions were reorganized as experimental territorial brigades, but in September of that year pilot exercises with the latter revealed that they were inadequate for speedy mobilization, and the brigades became divisions again.

The 32nd Division was transferred to the Special Red Banner Far Eastern Army during March 1934, leaving the corps with three divisions. The Saratov-based 22nd Aviation Detachment joined the corps on 1 October of that year. Corps units repaired track and restored telegraph communications damaged by a November 1935 landslide at a station of the Ryazan-Ural Railway. During the mid-1930s, Tkachev was succeeded in command by Mikhail Yefremov, Stepan Kalinin, and Vladimir Kolpakchi. By 1935, it included the 31st (Stalingrad) and 53rd (Engels) Territorial Rifle Divisions, in addition to the 12th Corps Artillery Regiment at Saratov. The corps headquarters was transferred to the Transbaikal Military District in September 1939 due to rising tensions with Japan and located at Borzya. Among its units was the 109th Rifle Division, which became a motorized division in early 1940 and transferred to the 5th Mechanized Corps in midyear.

It was commanded by Major General Daniil Petrov from 18 January 1941. By 22 June it included the 65th and 94th Rifle Divisions and was directly controlled by the district headquarters. During a reorganization of the forces stationed in the Transbaikal Military District, the corps was disbanded on 27 July. The units of the corps were used to form the 36th Army.

== Second wartime formation and postwar ==
The corps headquarters was formed by an order of 13 October 1942, and by 1 November was assigned the 77th, 261st, 349th, and 351st Rifle Divisions, directly controlled by the headquarters of the Transcaucasian Front. In November the 406th Rifle Division joined the corps while the 77th transferred to the 58th Army. Major General Georgy Kuparadze, who led it for the rest of the war, took command on 6 December. The corps guarded the Soviet–Turkish border for the remainder of the war. Corps support units included the 132nd Separate Communications Battalion, 126th Field Office of the State Bank, and the 2329th Field Postal Station. The corps joined the 45th Army in December with the 392nd and 406th Rifle Divisions. The 261st and 349th Rifle Divisions transferred to the corps from direct army subordination during January.

Major unit headquarters locations, mid-1943

From April, the corps was directly subordinated to the headquarters of the Transcaucasian Front, where it would remain for the rest of the war, with the 392nd and 406th Rifle Divisions, leaving the 261st and 349th with the 45th Army. By April, the corps was headquartered at Kutaisi with the 392nd at Batumi and the 406th at Akhalkalaki. The 51st (Batumi) and 151st (Akhalkalaki) Fortified Regions were operationally subordinated to the corps. It was 83% Georgian, 9% Russian, 4% Ukrainian, and 4% other nationalities by September. The 296th Rifle Division at Kutaisi (operationally subordinated to the corps from its formation in July 1943) transferred to the corps from the 13th Rifle Corps during January 1944, and remained with the corps for the rest of the war. The 392nd transferred to the 13th Rifle Corps during August, leaving the corps with the 296th and 406th Rifle Divisions for the rest of the war.

In 1946, its headquarters was transferred to Ordzhonikidze in the North Caucasus Military District, where it included the 3rd Guards and 11th Separate Rifle Brigades. Between 28 July 1949 and September 1954, it was a mountain rifle corps with the 24th Guards and 19th Mountain Rifle Divisions, formed from the 3rd Guards and 11th Brigades, respectively. When it reverted to the 12th Rifle Corps, the two divisions became rifle divisions again. The corps became the 12th Army Corps on 25 June 1957, with the 24th Guards becoming the 42nd Guards Motor Rifle Division and the 19th the 92nd Motor Rifle Division.

During the early 1960s, the 42nd Guards became a training unit and was subordinated to the North Caucasus Military District, and by the end of the decade the corps headquarters relocated to Krasnodar, replacing that of the 29th Army Corps. At Krasnodar, the corps controlled the 9th Motor Rifle Division at Maykop and two mobilization motor rifle divisions – the 62nd (co–located with the 9th) and the 156th at Novorossiysk. After the dissolution of the Soviet Union, the corps became part of the Russian Ground Forces and was expanded into the 49th Army in May 1992.

=== Formations at the end of the 1980s ===
- Corps Directorate [Headquarters], 411th separate security and support company (Krasnodar)
- 9th Motorized Rifle Division of the Krasnodar Red Banner Order of Kutuzov and the Red Star Division named after the Supreme Soviet of the Georgian SSR (Maikop), Commander Dorofeev, Alexander Anatolyevich
- 113th Motor Rifle Division of the cadre (Hot Key)
- The 156th Motor Rifle Division of the cadre. The division in 1987 was reorganized into the 880th Territorial Training Centre (TTC). In 1989, the 880th TTC was reorganized into the 5383rd BKhVT. (Novorossiysk)
- 99th Rocket Brigade (Krasnodar)
- 291st Artillery Order of the Suvorov Brigade (Maikop), Commander Markaryan, Pyotr Oganezovich.
- 214th Engineer-Sapper Proskurovskaya Red Banner, orders of Bohdan Khmelnitsky and the Red Star Brigade
- material support team (Krasnodar)
- 943rd Reactive Artillery Regiment (Maikop)
- 1128th anti-tank artillery regiment (Maikop)
- 162nd Engineer Regiment (Krasnodar)
- 573rd Separate Reconnaissance Artillery Battalion (Maikop)
- 64th separate communications battalion (Krasnodar)
- 170th separate air defense radio engineering battalion (Krasnodar)
- 444th Separate Electronic Warfare Battalion (Krasnodar)
- 5157th repair and restoration base (Slavyansk-on-Kuban)

=== Commanders ===
The following officers are known to have commanded the second wartime formation of the 12th Rifle Corps and the 12th Army Corps:

- Major General Georgy Kuparadze (December 1942 – June 1946)
- Lieutenant General Ivan Fedyunkin (30 December 1948 – 28 July 1949)
- Lieutenant General Mikhail Panchenko (28 July 1949 – 15 December 1950)
- Major General Alexander Shchagin (11 January 1951 – 18 May 1953)
- Lieutenant General Sergey Vladimirovich Sokolov (18 May 1953 – 16 May 1954)
- Major General Viktor Glebov (17 June 1954 – 11 June 1956)
- Lieutenant General Nikolay Lyashchenko (12 June 1956 – February 1958)
- Major General Gennady Obaturov (February 1958 – June 1960)
- Lieutenant General Fyodor Rykalov (27 June 1966 – 3 February 1970)
- Lieutenant General Ivan Kravchenko (4 February 1970 – 15 May 1973)
- Major General Lev Zaytsev (1979 – 1982)
- Lieutenant General Igor Puzanov (1990 – May 1992)
