= 406th Rifle Division =

406th Rifle Division (August, 1941 – June, 1946)
- Active: 1941 - 1946
- Country: Soviet Union
- Branch: Red Army
- Type: Division
- Role: Infantry
- Engagements: Battle of the Caucasus

Commanders
- Notable commanders: Col. Pyotr Yakovlevich Plekhov; Col. Georgii Ivanovich Kuparadze; Maj. Gen. Valerian Sergeevich Dzabakhidze; Col. Pyotr Iosifovich Chkhobadze

The 406th Rifle Division was raised in 1941 as an infantry division of the Red Army, and served throughout the Second World War in that role, but saw relatively little combat. It was raised as a Georgian National division in the Transcaucasus Military District, where it remained until the forces of German Army Group A began its drive on the oil fields there as part of Operation Blue. In August 1942 it joined the Northern Group in the Transcaucasus Front, in the 46th Army, defending the high passes through the High Caucasus Mountains west of Mount Elbrus. Once the German threat receded, the 406th returned to guard duties along the borders with Turkey and Iran for the duration of the war.

== Formation ==
The 406th began forming in August 1941 within the Georgian SSR, in the Transcaucasus Military District. Its order of battle, based on the first wartime shtat (table of organization and equipment) for rifle divisions, was as follows:

- 660th Rifle Regiment
- 662nd Rifle Regiment
- 668th Rifle Regiment
- 962nd Artillery Regiment
- 192nd Antitank Battalion
- 190th Antiaircraft Battery (later, 686th Antiaircraft Battalion)
- 683rd Mortar Battalion
- 461st Reconnaissance Company
- 680th Sapper Battalion
- 850th Signal Battalion (later, 850th Signal Company)
- 484th Medical/Sanitation Battalion
- 477th Chemical Protection (Anti-gas) Company
- 337th Motor Transport Company (later, 342nd)
- 249th Field Bakery
- 824th Divisional Veterinary Hospital (later, 406th)
- 1458th Field Postal Station
- 729th Field Office of the State Bank

Col. Pyotr Yakovlevich Plekhov was appointed to command of the division on September 1. At this time, it was noted as having most of its personnel of Georgian nationality. Later that month, it was assigned to the 45th Army in Transcaucasus Front, where it would remain for the rest of the year. In January 1942 it was reassigned to the 46th Army, back in the Transcaucasus Military District. On February 9 Colonel Plekhov handed his command to Col. Georgii Ivanovich Kuparadze.

== Battle of the Caucasus ==
When German Army Group A began its part of the summer offensive on July 7, the 406th was back in Transcaucasus Front with 46th Army. Rostov fell to the German forces on July 23, opening a path to the Caucasus region and the oil fields at Maikop, Baku and elsewhere. As of August 1 the division remained in the same Front and Army. By August 16 the German/Romanian XXXXIX Mountain Corps had regrouped for a thrust into the passes of the High Caucasus in an effort to take the Soviet ports on the Black Sea. The 46th Army had been tasked to defend a front of 275 km with two mountain rifle divisions, four regular rifle divisions, including the 406th, one rifle brigade and one cavalry division. They were only backed by a single tank battalion and the 7th NKVD Rifle Division in reserve. 46th Army's command left many of the passes undefended, believing them to be impassable for military forces. The division remained in second echelon at this time.

In September, 46th Army was reassigned to the Black Sea Group of Forces, still in Transcaucasus Front. It was tasked with defending the approaches to Sukhumi when the German 17th Army launched its Operation Attika on September 23 with its main drive on Tuapse. At this time, the 46th was still facing the XXXXIX Mountain Corps. By early November both sides were played out due to difficult terrain, attrition, and the onset of winter. That same month, the 406th was moved to the 12th Rifle Corps in the Front reserves, which was assigned to 45th Army in December.

=== Further service ===
From this point on the 406th was in the reserves of Transcaucasus Front, in the 12th Corps, which became a separate corps in that Front in April 1943 and was under the command of the now-Maj. Gen. Kuparadze. It remained there, along the southern borders with Iran and Turkey, until the end of the war in Europe in May 1945. On November 17 Colonel Dzabakhidze was promoted to the rank of major general, and on February 15, 1944, he handed his command to Col. Pyotr Iosifovich Chkhobadze who would remain in this post for the duration. The division was disbanded in June 1946, about the time the headquarters of 12th Corps was moved to Ordzhonikidze.
