= Yakov Kreizer =

Soviet field commander

Yakov Grigorevich Kreizer
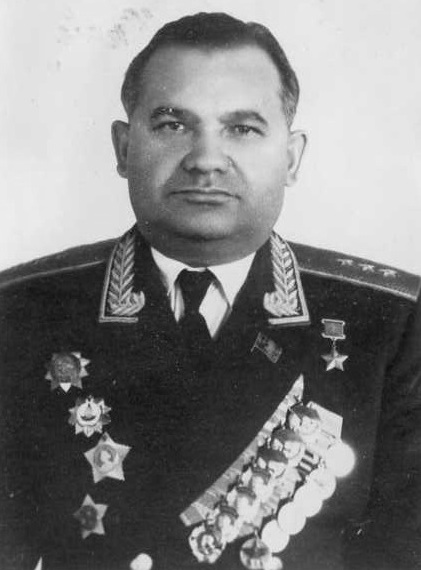
- Born: 4 November 1905; Voronezh, Russian Empire
- Died: 29 November 1969 (aged 64); Moscow, Soviet Union
- Military career
- Allegiance: Soviet Union
- Branch: Red Army
- Service years: 1921–1969
- Rank: Army General
- Commands: 172nd Rifle Division; 1st Moscow Motorized Rifle Division; 3rd Army; 2nd Guards Army; 51st Army; 45th Army; 7th Guards Army; 38th Army; South Ural Military District; Transbaikal Military District; Ural Military District; Far East Military District
- Conflicts: World War II
- Awards: Hero of the Soviet Union

Yakov Grigorevich Kreizer (Russian: Я́ков Григо́рьевич Кре́йзер; 4 November 1905, Voronezh – 29 November 1969, Moscow) was a Soviet field commander.

== Before the war ==
Kreizer's Jewish parents were granted permission to live outside the Jewish pale of settlement because his grandfather was a cantonist soldier in the Russian imperial army. Kreizer enlisted in the Red Army in 1921, volunteered to the school for infantry officers in Voronezh (1923) and rose to Colonel and commander of 172nd Rifle Division (1939–1940). His rapid promotion, like that of other senior Soviet officers of his generation, was made possible because Stalin's great purge had decimated the Red Army officers of the Civil War generation. During these years Kreizer continued his military education: in 1931 he graduated from the Higher Officer Training School "Vystrel" and in 1941 from the elite Frunze Military Academy. In March 1941 Kreizer was appointed commander of 1st Moscow Motorized Rifle Division.

== Battles in Belorussia ==
At the start of World War II the Red Army was notorious for its poor battlefield quality because a large number of its newly appointed commanders lacked initiative and skill. Kreizer was among a few senior officers who prepared his troops adequately for the requirements of the modern mobile war. In July 1941 Kreizer became the first Red Army General to outfight the Wehrmacht in a large-scale engagement. Kreizer's division took position along the Minsk-Moscow highway and faced the main brunt of German Army Group Center in its drive to Moscow, spearheaded by Heinz Guderian. Guderian, who in that time was widely considered the world's best commander of armoured forces, had at his disposal forces that were far superior to those of Kreizer in manpower, in number of tanks and in air support. In the battle of Borisov Kreizer stalled the advance of Guderian's elite panzer corps for two days, killed more than one thousand German troops, and destroyed several dozen tanks and twelve warplanes. When German numerical superiority made further defense of Borisov impossible, Kreizer skilfully conducted a fighting retreat along the highway to Orsha. In the subsequent battle of Orsha Kreizer stalled Guderian's panzers for twelve days. His resistance gave the Red Army enough time to bring up reserves to take up defensive positions along the river Dnieper. The battlefield skills and valor of Kreizer's troops and his ability to prevent Wehrmacht domination of the unfolding battle, in spite of German superiority in numbers and materiel, delivered a blow to the myth of German invincibility. The action of Kreizer and his men inspired Soviet confidence in the Red Army's capacity to defeat the Germans. At 35 years old Kreizer was promoted to Major-General; from being a divisional commander, he was promoted to commander of the 3rd Army, without ever having served at the corps level. On 21 July 1941 Stalin awarded Kreizer the distinction of Hero of the Soviet Union. Kreizer was the first General to receive this award during World War II; his division was among the first military formations to be awarded the title of Guards, the highest honorific title in the Soviet army.

== From Smolensk to the Baltics ==
Kreizer commanded the Soviet Third Army in the Battle of Smolensk, which effectively brought about the strategic end to the German Blitzkrieg, as well as in the momentous Battle of Moscow. In October 1942 Stavka entrusted Kreizer with the formation of the powerful Soviet Second Guards Army, trained for decisive action in the Battle of Stalingrad. During the battle in the winter 1942-1943 Kreizer was a deputy commander of that army under the more experienced Rodion Malinovsky and contributed to defeating Manstein's attempt to save the German 6th Army, surrounded in Stalingrad. For victory over Manstein, Kreizer was promoted to Lieutenant General. In February 1943, after Malinovsky was appointed the Front Commander, Kreizer resumed command of the Second Guards Army. From August 1943 until the end of the war he commanded the 51st Army. Kreizer played one of the key roles in defeating the Wehrmacht in Ukraine, Crimea, Belorussia, the Baltics and was one of the few commanders of Field Armies to be promoted to Colonel General. He was twice wounded during the war.

== After the war ==
After the war, Kreizer's advancement was stalled. For ten years he remained commander of an Army (45th Army (1945–1946), 7th Guards Army (1946–1948) and 38th Army (1949–1955)) and Colonel-General while less distinguished Generals were getting higher promotions. In 1953, during the Doctors Plot, Kreizer refused to sign a letter in favor of the campaign.

The change came with a consolidation of power by Nikita Khrushchev who knew Kreizer from the battle of Stalingrad and had a high opinion of him. Under Khrushchev, Kreizer commanded several Military Districts, the highest Soviet territorial units, each consisting of several armies: South Ural Military District (1955–1958); Transbaikal Military District (1958–1960) and Ural Military District (1960–1961).

With the worsening of Soviet relations with China, resulting from the Sino-Soviet split, the Soviet government became apprehensive of Chinese militancy. To strengthen the security of the Soviet borders and as a warning signal to the Chinese, the Kremlin appointed Kreizer to Commander-in-Chief of the Soviet armies in the Far East (Far East Military District) (1961–1963). Following this promotion in 1962 Kreizer received the rank of General of the Army, equivalent to British and German Field Marshal and General of the Army (United States). He was the only Jewish officer who achieved such high rank in the Soviet post-Great Purge military.

To confirm his status in the Soviet Party-state hierarchy, Kreizer was selected with a few others from the top Soviet military to the Supreme Soviet of the USSR (1962–1966). It appears that the Kremlin foresaw Kreizer for future higher promotion, but he became ill and in 1963 moved to the less demanding command of the Vystrel course. He served there until May 1969 when he joined the senior Group of General Inspectors of the Ministry of Defense, an honorific office for the most outstanding military commanders on their virtual retirement. He died half a year later.

== Awards ==
- "Gold Star" Medal Hero of the Soviet Union, No. 561
- Five Orders of Lenin
- Order of the Red Banner, four times
- Order of Suvorov, 1st and 2nd classes
- Order of Kutuzov, 1st class
- Order of Bogdan Khmelnitsky, 1st class
- Medal "For the Defence of Moscow"
- Medal "For the Defence of Stalingrad"
- Medal "For the Victory over Germany in the Great Patriotic War 1941–1945"
- Jubilee Medal "Twenty Years of Victory in the Great Patriotic War 1941-1945"
- Jubilee Medal "XX Years of the Workers' and Peasants' Red Army"
- Jubilee Medal "30 Years of the Soviet Army and Navy"
- Jubilee Medal "40 Years of the Armed Forces of the USSR"
- Jubilee Medal "50 Years of the Armed Forces of the USSR"
