= 109th Motorized Division =

1940–1941 Soviet military formation

109th Motorized Division (January, 1940 – July 19, 1941)
- Active: 1940–1941
- Country: Soviet Union
- Branch: Red Army
- Type: Division
- Role: Mechanized Infantry
- Engagements: Operation Barbarossa; Battle of Kiev

Commanders
- Notable commanders: Col. Nikolai Pavlovich Krasnoretskii

The 109th Motorized Division was formed from the 109th Rifle Division in January, 1940, in the Transbaikal Military District. It was one of the first Red Army mechanized divisions formed and also one of the first to be fully equipped with motor vehicles and tanks. Shortly before the German invasion, in late May, 1941, it began moving west by rail, arriving in western Ukraine on June 18. The division went into action on June 26, but by early July had lost most of its tanks and trucks. It was soon pulled back into the reserves of Southwestern Front and converted into the 304th Rifle Division.

== Formation ==
The 109th Rifle Division had first formed on April 15, 1939, at Tatarsk in the Siberian Military District, part of the 12th Rifle Corps. Col. Nikolai Pavlovich Krasnoretskii was appointed to command on June 1, and he would hold that post through the division's existence. In January, 1940, the division began re-forming as a motorized division, in accordance with a People's Commissariat of Defense order of December 7, 1939. After conversion, its order of battle was revised to the following:

- 381st Motor Rifle Regiment
- 602nd Motor Rifle Regiment (from 82nd Motor Rifle Division)
- 16th Tank Regiment (four tank battalions, each 52 BT tanks)
- 404th Artillery Regiment
- 256th Antitank Battalion
- 234th Antiaircraft Battalion
- 173rd Reconnaissance Battalion
- 229th Light Engineer Battalion
- 279th Signal Battalion
- 54th Artillery Park Battalion
- 281st Medical/Sanitation Battalion
- 234th Auto Transport Battalion
- 194th Repair and Recovery Battalion
- 31st Regulation Company
- 193rd Motorized Field Bakery
- 483rd Field Postal Station
- 167th Field Office of the State Bank

The 16th Tank Regiment was formed between January 29 and February 18, 1940 from the tank battalions of the 93rd, 94th, 109th, and the 152nd Rifle Division. The reorganization was completed on May 17, by which time the tank battalion of the 65th Motorized Division, whose conversion was cancelled, was added to complete the organization of the 16th Tank Regiment. By July, the division was at full strength with 275 light tanks when it was assigned to 5th Mechanized Corps. It was previously part of the 12th Rifle Corps. It was stationed at Chita until late May, 1941, when it began moving westward via the Trans-Siberian Railway.

== Combat history ==
On June 18, advance elements of the division had reached Berdichev and Proskurov in western Ukraine and began de-training. Most of 5th Corps' other elements had been diverted to the Western Front once the invasion began, so the 109th was the only division under the Corps' command when it first went into combat at Ostrog on June 26. Due to this splitting the division fought as part of the improvised "Group Lukin" (named after the commander of 16th Army), and after July 2 under command of 5th Army, in 5th Mechanized Corps, facing 13th Panzer Division north of Ostrog. The fighting over the next ten days, with little in the way of artillery or air support, cost the division almost all its tanks and motorization. On July 6, the 109th was equipped with 113 BT tanks, 11 BA armored cars, 285 trucks and cars, and 9 tractors. It had 2,705 officers and men on strength. On July 12 what remained was withdrawn into the reserves of Southwestern Front, and over the course of several days was converted into the 304th Rifle Division.
