= Fyodor Remezov =

Soviet general (1896–1990)

Fyodor Nikitich Remezov
- Native name: Фёдор Никитич Ремезов
- Born: 7 June 1896; Kasli, Yekaterinburgsky Uyezd, Perm Governorate, Russian Empire
- Died: 6 June 1990 (aged 93) Leningrad, Soviet Union
- Allegiance: Soviet Union
- Branch: Red Army; Soviet Army
- Service years: 1918–1959
- Rank: Lieutenant general
- Commands: Zhitomir Army Group; Transbaikal Military District; Oryol Military District; 20th Army; 13th Army; North Caucasus Military District; 56th Army; South Ural Military District; 45th Army
- Conflicts: Russian Civil War; World War II
- Awards: Order of Lenin (2)

Fyodor Nikitich Remezov (Russian: Фёдор Никитич Ремезов; 7 June [O.S. 26 May] 1896 – 6 June 1990) was a Soviet Army general during World War II who commanded several armies and military districts.

Remezov joined the Red Army in 1918 and fought in the Russian Civil War as a junior commander. After the war, he graduated from the Frunze Military Academy and went on to command the 45th Rifle Division in 1937. Remezov commanded several military districts between 1938 and 1940. After Operation Barbarossa began on 22 June 1941, Remezov briefly commanded 20th Army and subsequently took command of the 13th Army in Belarus on 8 July after its previous commander was mortally wounded. While leading a counterattack four days later, Remezov was severely wounded.

After recovering in September, he took command of the North Caucasus Military District and then the new 56th Army in October 1941 which he led in the Battle of Rostov in November 1941. This was his last front-line command; in January 1942 Remezov was transferred to command the South Ural Military District. In April of that year he took command of the 45th Army, which he led for the remainder of the war in rear-security duties. Postwar, he became head of the faculty of the Frunze Military Academy, deputy head of the Dzerzhinsky Military Academy, and assistant commander for military educational institutions of the Moscow Military District, before retiring in 1959.

== Early life and Russian Civil War ==
Remezov was born on 7 June 1896 in Kasli, Perm Governorate. He joined the Red Army in 1918. In 1919, he graduated from the Vyatka Infantry Command Courses. Remezov graduated from the Komintern Higher Tactical Infantry School for Red Army officers in 1921. He fought on the Russian Civil War's Eastern Front against the White Army of Kolchak, commanding a company and a battalion. Remezov transferred to command a separate battalion in the 9th Army's 33rd Kuban Rifle Division on the Southern Front, fighting against the White Army of Wrangel. He later fought in the suppression of an uprising in Vitebsk Governorate.

== Interwar ==
After the end of the war, Remezov became assistant chief of a rifle division's Operations staff department, and later a senior assistant chief. He subsequently became chief of staff of a rifle regiment. In 1930, he became head of a staff department in the Volga Military District and in April 1931 commander of a rifle regiment. In July 1937, he was appointed commander of the 45th Rifle Division. In July 1938, Remezov was promoted to command the new Zhitomir Army Group, and in July 1939, he became commander of the Transbaikal Military District. Remezov took command of the Oryol Military District in July 1940.

== World War II ==
After the German invasion of the Soviet Union, between late June and early July, Remezov temporarily commanded the new 20th Army, formed in the Oryol Military District. On 8 July, he took command of the 13th Army after its previous commander, Pyotr Filatov, was mortally wounded. The 13th Army fought in defensive battles on the Western Front against German troops from the 3rd Panzer Group in the Minsk Fortified Area. Under attack from superior forces, the army was forced to withdraw to the Berezina River around Borisov, and then to the Dnieper, where the army defended the line from Kopys to Novy Bykhov. From 10 July, the army fought in the Battle of Smolensk. On 12 July, he was severely wounded while personally leading a counterattack against the advancing XXIV Army Corps, and was replaced by Vasily Gerasimenko. After recovering, Remezov took command of the North Caucasus Military District on 4 September, leading it until 18 October. During this time, several cavalry divisions were formed in the district.

He was transferred to command the 56th Army (initially a separate army) in late October. The army was tasked with defending Rostov-on-Don from the north and northwest. When the German troops broke through, the army's troops were forced to retreat across the Don River. On 23 November, the army became part of the Transcaucasian Front. During the subsequent Rostov Offensive, the 9th and 56th Armies recaptured Rostov. At the end of November the army was transferred to the Southern Front. In mid-December, the army advanced to the Mius River north of Taganrog, where it switched to the defensive and fought in positional battles. In January 1942, Remezov was transferred to command the South Ural Military District. During his tenure in command of the district, he organized new and reserve units to be transferred to the active army on the frontlines, and new training units and schools were created. From April 1942 to the end of the war, Remezov led the 45th Army of the Transcaucasian Front, which covered the Turkish border and protected communications in Iran. On 22 February 1943, he was awarded the Order of Lenin.

== Postwar ==
After the end of the war, the 45th Army was withdrawn from Iran and disbanded. In 1945, Remezov became head of the faculty of the Frunze Military Academy. In January 1953, he became deputy head of the Dzerzhinsky Military Academy, and in May became assistant commander of the Moscow Military District for military educational institutions. After retiring in 1959, Remezov lived in Leningrad. On 6 April 1985, he was awarded the Order of the Patriotic War 1st class on the 40th anniversary of the end of World War II. Remezov died on 6 June 1990.
