= 1st Mountain Cavalry Division (Soviet Union) =

- Active: July 1941 – 1946
- Country: Soviet Union
- Branch: Soviet Army
- Type: Cavalry
- Role: Cavalry Support and Attack
- Size: Division
- Part of: Transcaucasus Military District; 45th Army; 47th Army

The 1st Mountain Cavalry Division was a division-sized unit of the Red Army that existed during the Great Patriotic War and during the Allied Invasion of Iran.

== History ==
The 1st Mountain Cavalry Division was formed originally as the "1st Mountain Cavalry Division" in July 1941 and immediately assigned to the 45th Army on the Iranian Border, under the command of Colonel Aleksandr Dmitriyevich Alekseyev. In August of the same year the division was assigned to the 47th Army and in October as part of the Soviet Occupation Forces in Persia (Transcaucasian Front). In December it was re-designated to the "1st Cavalry Division" and was assigned to the 15th Cavalry Corps. Colonel Aleksi Inauri commanded the division from August 1942 to February 1946. The division continued to serve as part of the Soviet occupation forces in Iran until the end of the war. Following the Soviet withdrawal from Iran in spring 1946, the division was disbanded in September of that year with the 15th Cavalry Corps as part of the 4th Army in the Transcaucasian Military District.

== Structure ==
The division included the following units:

- Headquarters
  - 6th Cavalry Regiment
  - 9th Cavalry Regiment
  - 12th Cavalry Regiment
