= 402nd Rifle Division =

402nd Rifle Division (August 15, 1941 – December, 1945)
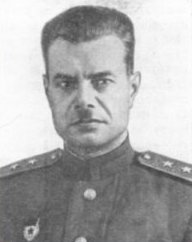
- Postwar photo of Maj. Gen. M. T. Karakoz after promotion to lieutenant general
- Active: 1941 - 1945
- Country: Soviet Union
- Branch: Red Army
- Type: Division
- Role: Infantry
- Engagements: Battle of the Caucasus

Commanders
- Notable commanders: Col. Timofei Ivanovich Volkovich; Col. Ali Nagi Huseynov; Maj. Gen. Mark Trofimovich Karakoz; Maj. Gen. Tarlan Abdullah oglu Aliyarbayov

The 402nd Rifle Division was raised in 1941 as an infantry division of the Red Army, and served throughout the Second World War in that role. It was raised as an Azerbaijani National division in the Transcaucasus Military District and first formed part of the occupation force following the Anglo-Soviet invasion of Iran. It returned to the USSR in April, 1942, remaining in the Caucasus region until the forces of German Army Group A began its drive on the oil fields there as part of Operation Blue. In October it joined the Northern Group in the Transcaucasus Front, in the 44th Army, defending the direct route to Baku. The division took part in the counteroffensive that threw the German forces out of the Caucasus, but took heavy losses in the process. Once the German threat receded the 402nd returned to guard duties along the border with Turkey and served as a training establishment for Azeri recruits for the duration of the war.

== Formation ==
The 402nd began forming on August 15, 1941 at Aghdam, Azerbaijan, in the Transcaucasus Military District. Its order of battle, based on the first wartime shtat (table of organization and equipment) for rifle divisions, was as follows:

- 833rd Rifle Regiment
- 839th Rifle Regiment
- 840th Rifle Regiment
- 960th Artillery Regiment
- 184th Antitank Battalion (formed twice)
- 188th Antiaircraft Battery (until December 11, 1942)
- 672nd Mortar Battalion (until November 30, 1942)
- 459th Reconnaissance Company
- 678th Sapper Battalion
- 848th Signal Battalion (later, 694th Signal Company)
- 482nd Medical/Sanitation Battalion
- 475th Chemical Protection (Anti-gas) Company
- 512th Motor Transport Company
- 247th Field Bakery
- 822nd Divisional Veterinary Hospital
- 1456th Field Postal Station
- 304th Field Office of the State Bank (later, 727th)

Col. Timofei Ivanovich Volkovich was appointed to command of the division on the day it started forming. As of September it was noted as having 90 percent of its personnel of Azerbaijani nationality. (As of January, 1944 it would be 50 percent Azeri.) It was initially assigned to the 47th Army near the Iranian border. In October the division moved into northern Iran as part of the Soviet occupation force there after the invasion of that country had been completed. On February 23, 1942 Colonel Volkovich was replaced in command by Col. Ali Nagi Guseynov.

== Battle of the Caucasus ==
The 402nd returned to the Soviet Union in April but remained far from the fighting fronts. As part of the German summer offensive, Operation Blue, Rostov fell to Army Group A on July 23, opening a path to the Caucasus region and the oil fields at Maikop, Baku and elsewhere. As of August 1 the division was assigned to 45th Army in Transcaucasus Front. It was still there on September 29 when Lt. Gen. I. I. Maslennikov, commander of the Front's Northern Group of Forces, received an order from the STAVKA which stated, in part:

"7. To secure the defenses along the Makhachkala axis: a) [Occupy] the southern bank of the Terek River from its mouth to Nogai-Mirzy with 389th, 223rd and 402nd Rifle Divisions and 3rd and 5th Rifle Brigades, while transferring 402nd Rifle Division from Nakhichevan to the Gudermes region..."

This brought the division under the command of the 44th Army. As of October 25 the Army was continuing to hold along the Terek as Army Group A began what became its final effort to break through to Grozny and, ultimately, Baku. This offensive initially targeted the 37th Army and later the 9th Army and by the time it was halted on the outskirts of Ordzhonikidze on November 5 the 44th Army had hardly been affected and, in fact, posed a threat to the overextended III Panzer Corps.

On November 30 the division, in cooperation with the 414th and 416th Rifle Divisions and the 5th Guards Cavalry Corps, launched an offensive in the direction of Sheftovo and Mozdok. Over the next 11 days the 402nd advanced in bitter fighting and liberated a number of villages without armor and only weak artillery support. During this period the division advanced 34 km and destroyed or captured 108 armored vehicles, nine trucks and seven bunkers. The German superiority in armor led to several instances in which elements of the division, such as the 3rd Battalion of the 833rd Regiment, were encircled after gaining prominent heights and had break out or be relieved. However, in the area of Naydenovskaya Grove and the "Precast Building", several encircled units were unable to escape and after heavy fighting their personnel were killed or captured. The commander of the 839th Regiment, Major Bayramov, also perished in one of these battles. Beginning on December 6 the 833rd Regiment, under command of Major A. Abbasov, was engaged in defensive fighting on the approaches to Mozdok, fending off as many as 13 German counterattacks led by tanks before the German forces retreated. In recognition of this stand 75 officers and men of the Regiment were awarded orders or medals, with Abbasov winning the Order of the Red Banner. On December 9 the division was assigned a battalion of 15 tanks to continue the offensive. The next day Col. Dmitrii Mikhailovich Suzranov took over command from Colonel Guseynov. With armor support the advance continued another 12 km over the following days, but as of December 12 the division had been reduced to about 4,000 personnel, less than half its starting strength. 44th Army ordered that the remaining men be used to replenish the 416th Division, while the divisional headquarters was directed to Grozny to rebuild.

=== Further service ===
From this point on the 402nd was in the reserves of Transcaucasus Front, in effect becoming the Azeri national training division for those (such as the 416th) serving at the front. It remained there, far from the fighting front until the end of the war in Europe in May, 1945. On December 20 Colonel Suzranov handed his command to Col. Mark Trofimovich Karakoz, who would be promoted to major general on October 16, 1943. He in turn handed his command to Maj. Gen. Tarban Abdulla-Ogly Alyarbekov on April 25, 1944, who was later replaced on March 14, 1945 by Col. Gadzhi-Baba-Mamed-Ogly Zeinalov, who would remain in this post for the duration. Postwar, the division was disbanded as part of the Baku Military District in late 1945.
