= Steppe Front =

Front of the Red Army during WWII

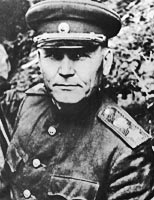
Colonel General Ivan Konev commanded the Steppe Front

The Steppe Front (Russian: Степной фронт) was a front of the Red Army during the Second World War which existed from July to October 1943.

== History ==
On 9 July 1943, Stavka designated a new Reserve Front in the Voronezh region, that had been effective since 30 April. It consisted of the command component of the 2nd Reserve Army (augmented by several officer and NCO courses), the 27th, 52nd, 53rd, 46th, 47th, 4th Guards Tank, 5th Air Army and eight mobile corps (Tank, Guards Tank, and Mechanised). Most of these armies had been reassigned from the Northwestern Front, North Caucasus Front, or the Reserve of the Supreme High Command (Stavka reserve, or the RVGK). On 13 April 1943 the Front was renamed the Steppe Military District, to be effective 15 April.

The Steppe Military District was redesignated the Steppe Front on July 9, 1943. It incorporated forces from the Soviet rear areas to the West of Kursk salient along the line Tula-Yelets-Stary Oskol-Rossosh (Тула-Елец-Старый Оскол-Россошь). It included units pulled out of the battles of Stalingrad and Leningrad and others.

Under the command of Colonel General Ivan Konev from July to October 1943, it took part in the Battle of Kursk.

On October 20, 1943, the Steppe Front was renamed the 2nd Ukrainian Front, remaining under Konev's command.

== See also ==
- Combat composition of the Soviet Army
