= 20th Army (Soviet Union) =

- 20-я армия
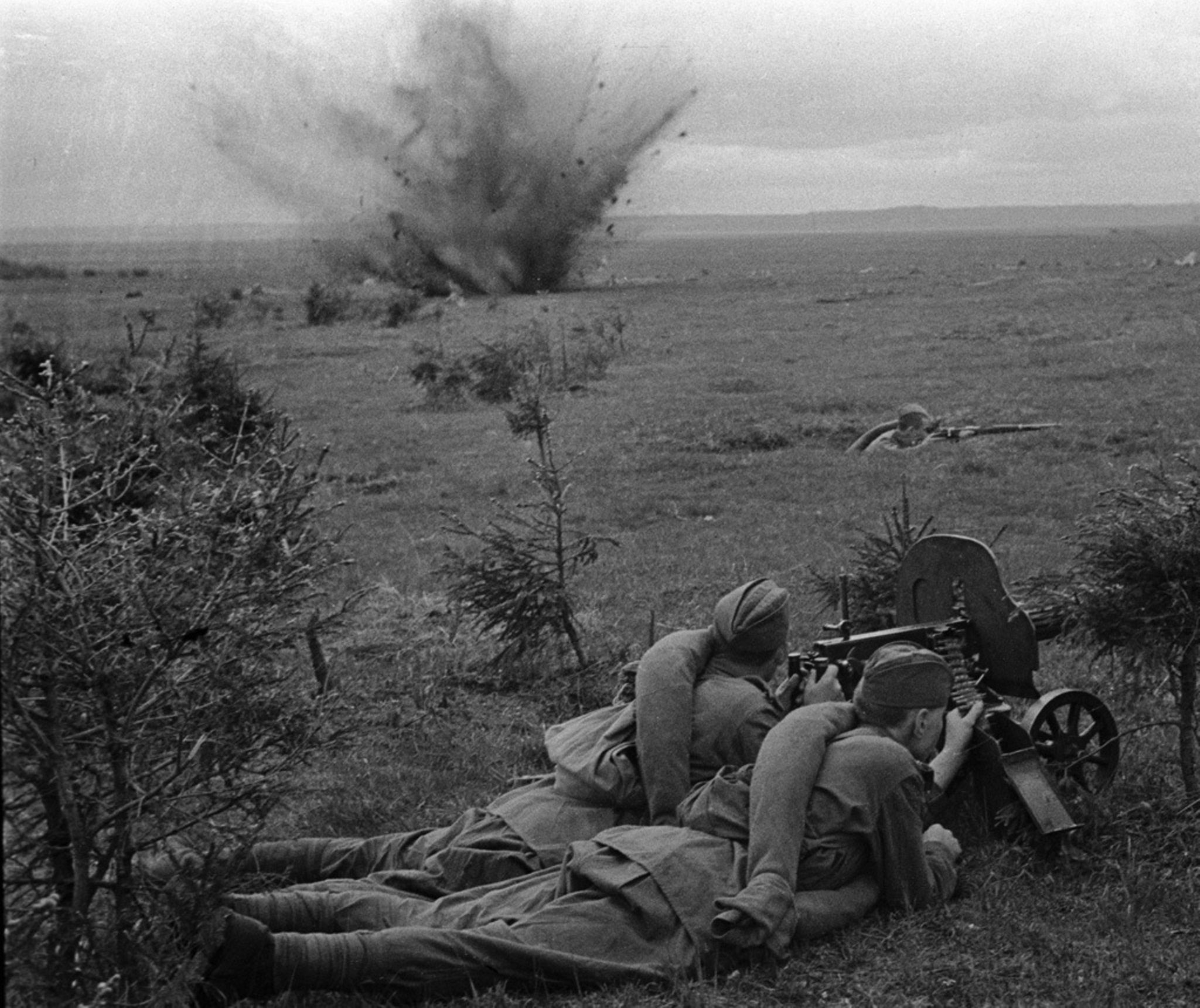
- 20th Army soldiers fighting south of Dorogobuzh, 1 September 1941
- Active: 1941–1944
- Country: Soviet Union
- Branch: Red Army
- Type: Combined arms
- Size: Field army
- Engagements: World War II: Battle of Smolensk; Battle of Moscow; Battles of Rzhev

Commanders
- Notable commanders: Pavel Kurochkin; Andrei Vlasov; Nikolai Berzarin; Mikhail Khozin; Max Reyter; Anton Lopatin; Nikolai Gusev

The 20th Army (Russian: 20-я армия) was a field army of the Red Army that fought on the Eastern Front during World War II.

== First formation ==
The Army was first formed in the Orel Military District in June 1941. On 22 June 1941 the Army was part of the Reserve of the Supreme High Command and was located west of Moscow.

On 27 June 1941 it was proposed to Joseph Stalin that the Soviet armies (13th Army, 19th Army, 20th, 21st Army, and 22nd Army) would defend the line going through the Daugava-Polotsk-Vitebsk-Orsha-Mogilev-Mazyr as part of the Reserve Front.

Committed as part of Western Front in defensive battles in Belarus, Smolensk, and Vyazma. By 5 August 1941 the army, in David Glantz's words, had been 'reduced to a skeleton.' The strength of the 289th Rifle Division had fallen to 285 men, 17 machine guns, and one anti-tank gun, the 73rd Rifle Division to 100 men and 4 to 5 machine guns per regiment, 144th Rifle Division to 440 men, and 153rd Rifle Division to 750 men. The Army HQ was disbanded having been encircled and destroyed in the Vyazma Pocket.

=== Order of Battle 22 June 1941 ===
Source: Combat composition of the Soviet Army (BSSA) via tashv.nm.ru and Leo Niehorster

- 61st Rifle Corps
  - 110th Rifle Division
  - 144th Rifle Division
  - 172nd Rifle Division
- 69th Rifle Corps
  - 73rd Rifle Division
  - 229th Rifle Division
  - 233rd Rifle Division
- 18th Rifle Division
- 301st Howitzer Artillery Regiment (RGK)
- 537th High Power Howitzer Artillery Regiment (RGK)
- 438th Corps Artillery Regiment
- 7th Mechanised Corps
  - 14th Tank Division
  - 18th Tank Division
  - 1st Moscow Motor Rifle Division
  - 9th Motorcycle Regiment
- 60th Pontoon Bridge Battalion

=== Commanders ===
- Lieutenant General Fyodor Remezov (Jun–Jul 1941)
- Lieutenant General Pavel Kurochkin (Jul–Aug 1941)
- Lieutenant General Mikhail Fedorovich Lukin (Aug–Sep 1941)
- Lieutenant General Filipp Yershakov (Sep 1941 – Oct 1941) (POW)

== Second formation ==
Reestablished in November 1941 from Operational Group Liziukov. Reformed November 1941 for the Battle of Moscow, including 331st and 350th Rifle Divisions, and the 28th, 35th, and 64th separate rifle brigades. Fought as part of the Western Front. In 1942-43 it operated on the Rzhev-Sychevka bridgehead (including 42nd Guards Rifle Division from November 1942), and took part in the Rzhev-Vyazma offensive operation. In 1944 it became part of the Stavka Reserve and was then reassigned to Kalinin Front and Leningrad Front. It was disbanded in April 1944 by being dispersed within the formations of 3rd Baltic Front.

The army was in strategic reserve from July 1943 to April 1944. In April 1944 the headquarters was disbanded and used to form the 3rd Baltic Front.

=== Commanders ===
- Lieutenant General Andrey Vlasov (Nov 1941 – Mar 1942)
- Lieutenant General Max Reyter (Mar–Sep 1942)
- Major General Nikolay Kiryukhin (Oct–Dec 1942)
- Lieutenant General Mikhail Khozin (Dec 1942 – Jan 1943)
- Lieutenant General Nikolai Berzarin (Jan–Mar 1943)
- Major General Arkady Yermakov (Mar–Aug 1943)
- Lieutenant General Nikolai Berzarin (Aug–Sep 1943)
- Major General Arkady Yermakov (Sep 1943)
- Lieutenant General Anton Lopatin (Sep–Oct 1943)
- Lieutenant General Nikolai Gusev (Nov 1943 – Apr 1944)
