= Orel Military District =

- Active: 1918–1922; 1938–1941; 1943–1945
- Country: RSFSR; Soviet Union
- Type: Military district
- Headquarters: Orel
- Engagements: World War II

Commanders
- Notable commanders: Mikhail Yefremov; Fyodor Remezov; Pavel Kurochkin

The Orel Military District (Russian: Орловский военный округ (ОрВО), romanized: Orlovskiy voyennyy okrug (OrVO)) was a military district of the Russian Soviet Federative Socialist Republic and the Soviet Union. Established in 1918 during the Russian Civil War, the district was disbanded after the end of the war in 1922. It was reestablished during the pre-World War II Soviet buildup in 1938. At the beginning of Operation Typhoon, the German attack on Moscow in October 1941, the district headquarters in the city of Orel was surprised by the German attack and hastily forced to flee the city. After most of the district's territory was occupied, it was disbanded. The district was reformed in 1943 after the area was recaptured and disbanded with the end of World War II in 1945.

== First formation ==
Boundaries of the district in 1919, showing the addition of Tambov Governorate

The Orel Military District was first formed along with other rear area military districts during the Russian Civil War on 31 March 1918, with headquarters at Orel. The district included Voronezh Governorate, Kursk Governorate, Orel Governorate, and Chernigov Governorate. On 8 June 1919, it was subordinated to the Southern Front. On 29 June, Tambov Governorate was added to the district. It was tasked with forming new units and formations for the Red Army and organizing the vsevobuch, a system of universal military training. In the summer and fall of 1919, the district's troops were involved in battles against White commander Konstantin Mamontov's raid into the Soviet rear. The district was transferred to the control of the Southwestern Front on 10 January 1920, and returned to the Southern Front a month later. Between January and July 1921, troops of the district participated in the suppression of the Tambov Rebellion, an anti-Soviet peasant revolt. During the war, the district called up 300,000 men and formed four rifle divisions, a cavalry division, and other smaller units, while training 67,000 men under vsevobuch. After the end of the war, the district was disbanded on 9 March 1922, and its territory was ceded to the Moscow Military District and the Western Military District.

== Second formation ==
On 28 July 1938, the district was reformed from the headquarters of the 10th Rifle Corps, as part of a pre-World War II buildup of the Soviet Armed Forces. It included Voronezh Oblast, Kursk Oblast, and Orel Oblast. Tambov Oblast was added to the district in October 1939. The district was tasked with maintaining the military and mobilization readiness of the troops, their rearmament with new equipment, and pre-conscription training of youths for military service. After the German invasion of the Soviet Union on 22 June 1941, the 20th Army was formed in the district under the command of district commander Fyodor Remezov. Lieutenant General Pavel Kurochkin replaced Remezov, and was himself replaced by Lieutenant General Alexander Tyurin in July. The district also mobilized those eligible for military service, formed new units and formations, sent march battalions to the front, and expanded the network of hospitals and other rear services. 17 rifle divisions, five brigades, and eight reserve brigades were formed in the district after 22 June.

On 2 October, German troops began Operation Typhoon, an offensive which aimed to capture Moscow. German tank troops quickly broke through Soviet lines and advanced deep into the Soviet rear. The 4th Panzer Division reached Orel on 3 October, surprising the military district's headquarters, which hastily left the city. Tyurin, district chief of staff P.E. Glinsky, and district commissar N.E. Yefimov were held responsible for the abandonment of Orel, with Tyurin sentenced to seven years of imprisonment, and Glinsky and Yefimov to five years. However, all three were later pardoned, demoted, and sent back to the front. The district headquarters was subsequently relocated to Yelets, Tambov, and Orenburg. With most of its territory under German occupation, the district was disbanded on 8 December and its remaining territory transferred to the Volga Military District. The headquarters of the Orel Military District was used to form the headquarters of the South Ural Military District in Orenburg on 26 November.

== Third formation ==
The district was reformed on 21 August 1943, under the command of then-Major General Matvei Popov. It included troops in Kursk and Orel Oblasts, transferred from the Moscow Military District, and Voronezh Oblast, transferred from the Volga Military District. Despite its name, the district's third formation was headquartered in Voronezh. On 30 October, Tambov Oblast became part of the district after being transferred from the Volga Military District. In October, the district temporarily oversaw recently recaptured Gomel and Polesia Voblasts in eastern Belarus. From July 1944, the district included newly reestablished Bryansk Oblast. The district was tasked with restoring military commissariats in its territory, creating lines of communication with the front, forming march battalions for movement to the front, forming new units, and clearing mines from the territory of the district. Postwar, it became the Voronezh Military District on 9 July 1945.

== Commanders ==
The district's first formation was commanded by the following officers:

- A. Ya. Semashko (May 1918–January 1919)
- A.D. Makarov (January 1919)
- Pyotr Shcherbakov (January 1919–January 1920)
- O.A. Skudre (January 1920–March 1921)
- Alexander Alexandrov (March–July 1921)
- O.A. Skudre (July 1921–March 1922)

The district's second formation was commanded by the following officers:

- Komkor (promoted to Komandarm 2nd rank December 1939, converted to Lieutenant General June 1940) Mikhail Yefremov (July 1938–July 1940)
- Lieutenant General Fyodor Remezov (July 1940–19 June 1941)
- Lieutenant General Pavel Kurochkin (19 June–July 1941)
- Lieutenant General Alexander Tyurin (July–October 1941)

The district's third formation was commanded by the following officer:

- Major General (promoted to Lieutenant General January 1944) Matvei Popov (August 1943–July 1945)
