= South Ural Military District =

- Active: 1 Dec 1941 – 15 Jan 1958
- Country: Soviet Union
- Type: Military district
- Headquarters: Chkalov
- Engagements: Great Patriotic War

Commanders
- Notable commanders: see list

The South Ural Military District (Russian: Южно-Уральский военный округ, ЮжУрВО; tr. Yuzhno-Uralsky Voyenny Okrug, YuzhUrVO) was a military administrative division of the Soviet Armed Forces that existed from 1 December 1941 to 15 January 1958.

== History ==
According to the directive No. 0444 of People's Commissar of Defense of the USSR Josef Stalin on November 26, 1941, established the South Ural Military District in Bashkir, Headquarters of the Military District was in Chkalov, appointed Lieutenant General Vladimir Nikolaevich Kurdyumov as commander. The management of YuzhUrVO was formed on the basis of Headquarters Orel Military District. The district included the territory of Chkalov Oblast, Bashkir ASSR and West Kazakh (Uralsk Oblast, Guryev Oblast, and Akhtyubinsk Oblast).

The 193rd Rifle Division was reformed at Sorochinsk, within the District's boundaries, from December 1941 to 3 January 1942.

During the Khrushchev reduction of 1958, the South Ural Military District was disbanded, and its territory was assigned to the Volga and the Turkestan Military District.

== Commanders ==
- Vladimir Nikolaevich Kurdyumov, Lieutenant-General (November 1941 - January 1942)
- Fedor Nikititch Remezov, Lieutenant-General (January - April 1942)
- Matvei Timofeevich Popov, Major-General (April 1942 - August 1943)
- Nikolai Ivanovich Dementyev, Major-General (August - September 1943)
- Max Reyter, Colonel-General (September 1943 - July 1945)
- Georgiy Zakharov, General of the Army (July 1945 - April 1946)
- Semyon Timoshenko, Marshal of the Soviet Union (April 1946 - March 1949)
- Pavel Alekseevich Belov, Colonel-General (March 1949 - May 1955)
- Yakov Kreizer, Colonel-General (May 1955 - January 1958)
