= 23rd Rifle Corps =

- Allegiance: Soviet Union
- Branch: Soviet Red Army
- Engagements: Soviet invasion of Poland

Commanders
- Notable commanders: Pavel Kurochkin

The 23rd Rifle Corps was a corps of the Soviet Red Army. It was part of the 4th Army. It took part in the Soviet invasion of Poland in 1939.

== History ==
On 22 June 1941 it was part of the Transcaucasian Military District comprising the 136th and 138th Rifle Divisions.

The 45th Army was formed in late July 1941 in the Transcaucasian Military District from the Staff of 23rd Rifle Corps.

At the end of the war the corps joined the new Central Group of Forces in Austria and Czechoslovakia. In accordance with an order of the Central Group of Forces, the 252nd Rifle Division was transported by rail to the Soviet Union via Kaposvár, Budapest, Sighet, Rostov, and Mineralnye Vody, with the rest of the 23rd Rifle Corps from 20 December 1945. By February 15, 1946 the 252nd Rifle Division had fully arrived in the Stavropol Military District (merged into the North Caucasus Military District shortly afterwards). The 295th Rifle Division (Second Formation) was relocated after the end of the war from the GSFG in Germany to Stavropol in the North Caucasus Military District with the 23rd Rifle Corps, where it became the 30th Separate Rifle Brigade in 1946. In October 1953, the brigade was upgraded into the 295th Rifle Division.

The 23rd Rifle Corps was reformed in accordance with a General Staff directive of 4 March 1955 and a Ministry of Defense order of 13 June, by renumbering the 79th Rifle Corps in the Group of Soviet Forces in Germany. Its headquarters was disbanded on 4 July 1956, with its divisions directly subordinated to the 3rd Army headquarters.

== Units ==
- 52nd Rifle Division
- Dnieper Flotilla
