= 36th Bomber Aviation Division =

36th Fighter-Bomber Aviation Division (1984–1988) 36th Bomber Aviation Division (1988–1992)
- Active: 1984–1992
- Country: Soviet Union
- Branch: Soviet Air Force
- Type: Aviation division
- Garrison/HQ: Bolshoye Shiraki

The 36th Bomber Aviation Division was an aviation division of the Soviet Air Force during the 1980s and early 1990s. It was originally formed in 1984 as a fighter-bomber aviation division. The division became a bomber aviation division four years later and was based in Bolshoye Shiraki in the Georgian Soviet Socialist Republic.

== History ==
In August 1984, the 36th Fighter-Bomber Aviation Division was activated in Bolshoye Shiraki, part of Transcaucasian Military District Aviation. It included the 34th, 168th Guards and 976th Fighter-Bomber Aviation Regiments. In 1988, the division became the 36th Bomber Aviation Division and was subordinated to the 34th Air Army. Its regiments were converted into bomber aviation regiments. The 143rd Bomber Aviation Regiment became part of the division in 1989. In 1992, the division was disbanded.
