= Pavel Kurochkin =

Soviet general (1900–1989)

- Павел Алексеевич Курочкин
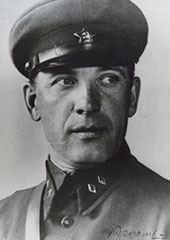
- Born: 19 November 1900; Gornevo, Smolensk Governorate, Russian Empire
- Died: 28 December 1989 (aged 89); Moscow, Russian SFSR, Soviet Union
- Military career
- Allegiance: Soviet Union
- Service years: 1918–1970
- Rank: Army General
- Commands: 23rd Rifle Corps; 17th Army; 20th Army; 43rd Army; 11th Army; 34th Army; North-Western Front; 2nd Belorussian Front; 60th Army; Kuban Military District
- Conflicts: Russian Civil War; World War II; Battle of Smolensk; Toropets-Kholm Operation; Korsun-Cherkassy Pocket; Lvov-Sandomierz Offensive
- Awards: Hero of the Soviet Union
- Other work: Chairman of the Supreme Military Council of the Warsaw Pact; Deputy to the Supreme Soviet

Pavel Alekseyevich Kurochkin (Russian: Павел Алексеевич Курочкин; 19 November 1900 [O.S. 6 November] – 28 December 1989) was a Soviet army commander.

== Military career ==
Pavel Kurochkin was born in the village of Gornevo, Smolensk Governorate. He joined the Red Army in 1918. Kurochkin completed cavalry courses in Petrograd in 1920, the year when he also joined the Russian Communist Party (Bolsheviks). He graduated from the Red Army High Cavalry school in 1923, the Frunze Military Academy in 1932 and the General Staff Academy in 1940.

=== Russian Civil War ===
During the Civil War, Kurochkin saw action against General Pyotr Krasnov near Gatchina, the British-American intervention in the north and General Nikolai Yudenich in 1919. He commanded a cavalry regiment in the Polish-Soviet war and was involved in the suppression of the Tambov Rebellion in 1921.

=== Inter-war period ===
In 1935 he was promoted to chief commander of a cavalry division. After the Soviet-Finnish war broke out, he took over as the commanding officer of 23rd Rifle Corps. From 1940 to 1941, he served as commander-in-chief of the 1st Army Group in Mongolia, commanding officer of the 17th Army in Mongolia, commander-in-chief of the Transbaikal Military District and commander-in-chief of the Orel Military District.

=== World War II ===
In July 1941 he was given command of the 20th Army which participated in the unsuccessful defense of Smolensk.

He briefly held the command of the 43rd Army in August 1941 until his promotion to commander-in-chief of the North-Western Front. He held that post until October 1942, when he was moved to command the Soviet 11th Army and then the 34th Army. He was again placed in command of the North-Western Front from July to November 1943. It was during this time that Kurochkin commanded the Toropets-Kholm Operation.

From December 1943 until February 1944, he was the first deputy commander-in-chief of the First Ukrainian Front under Marshal Konev and was remembered for his planning of the bloody Korsun–Shevchenkovsky Offensive.

From February to April 1944, he commanded the units of the Second Belorussian Front. His last assignment of the war would be commanding the 60th Army from April 1944 through May 1945 which took part in the Lvov-Sandomierz operation and fought in Central Europe.

For all his merits and achievements, Kurochkin was awarded with the highest Soviet honor, Hero of the Soviet Union.

==== Auschwitz-Birkenau Death Camp Discovery ====
Kurochkin was commander of the 60th Army, within the 1st Ukrainian Front, commanded by Ivan Konev. It was this formation that initially advanced into southern Poland during the larger Vistula-Oder offensive in early 1945. On January 27, 1945, the 322nd Rifle Division of Kurochkin's army entered the Auschwitz-Birkenau death camp near Brzezinka. They are credited with being the first Allied army to enter and liberate a concentration camp complex and discover the scale of the Holocaust. Kurochkin's situation reports were concise and professional, while acknowledging the scale of the atrocity.

=== Post-war career ===
Immediately after the war, Kurochkin briefly headed the Kuban Military District until his appointment in 1946 as first deputy commander-in-chief of the Soviet Military Administration in Germany. After his tour in East Germany ended in 1947, he took over as an assistant commander-in-chief of the Far Eastern Military District.

From 1951 to 1968, Kurochkin served in military academies, first at the Military Academy of the General Staff and later as the Commandant of the Frunze Military Academy. In 1968, he became the chairman of the Supreme Command of the United Military Forces of the Warsaw Pact. Kurochkin finished his military career as a general inspector of the Ministry of Defense. He went on to become a deputy of the Supreme Soviet of the USSR and was awarded with the Order of Lenin in 1980. Kurochkin died in Moscow in 1989.

== Honours and awards ==
- Hero of the Soviet Union
- Five Orders of Lenin
- Order of the October Revolution
- Four Orders of the Red Banner
- Order of Suvorov 1st class
- Two Orders of Kutuzov 1st class
- Order of the Patriotic War 1st class
- Order of the Badge of Honour
- Order for Service to the Homeland in the Armed Forces of the USSR 3rd class
- Jubilee Medal "In Commemoration of the 100th Anniversary since the Birth of Vladimir Il'ich Lenin"
- Medal "For the Victory over Germany in the Great Patriotic War 1941–1945"
- Jubilee Medal "Twenty Years of Victory in the Great Patriotic War 1941-1945"
- Jubilee Medal "Thirty Years of Victory in the Great Patriotic War 1941-1945"
- Jubilee Medal "Forty Years of Victory in the Great Patriotic War 1941-1945"
- Medal "For the Liberation of Prague"
- Medal "Veteran of the Armed Forces of the USSR"
- Jubilee Medal "XX Years of the Workers' and Peasants' Red Army"
- Jubilee Medal "30 Years of the Soviet Army and Navy"
- Jubilee Medal "40 Years of the Armed Forces of the USSR"
- Jubilee Medal "50 Years of the Armed Forces of the USSR"
- Jubilee Medal "60 Years of the Armed Forces of the USSR"
- Jubilee Medal "70 Years of the Armed Forces of the USSR"
