= 47th Army =

- 47-я армия
- Active: 1941–1946
- Country: Soviet Union
- Branch: Red Army
- Size: Field army
- Part of: Transcaucasian Front Caucasian Front; Crimean Front; North Caucasian Front; Steppe Front; 1st Ukrainian Front; 2nd Belorussian Front; 1st Belorussian Front Group of Soviet Forces in Germany
- Engagements: World War II: Belgorod-Kharkov Offensive Operation; Vistula-Oder Offensive; East Pomeranian Offensive; Berlin Offensive

Commanders
- Notable commanders: Andrei Grechko

The 47th Army (Russian: 47-я армия) was a field army of the Red Army during World War II, active from 1941 to 1946.

== History ==
The 47th Army was formed in late July 1941 in the Transcaucasian Military District as part of the Soviet Union's border defenses with Iran. On 1 August 1941 the army's composition was reported as including the 236th Rifle Division, 63rd and 76th Mountain Rifle Divisions, the 116th Howitzer Artillery Regiment (an RVGK asset), the 456th Corps Artillery Regiment, the 6th and 54th Tank Divisions, and engineering forces which included the 61st motorized engineer battalion, 75th independent engineer battalion, and the 6th and 54th pontoon bridge battalions.

47th Army route of march, 1941–1945
Source: When Titans Clashed (Glantz)

Soviet units began their part of the Anglo-Soviet invasion of Iran on 25 August 1941. The 47th Army broke through the border and moved from the Azerbaijan SSR into Iranian Azerbaijan. They moved towards Tabriz and Lake Urmia. They captured the Iranian city of Jolfa. An Iranian reconnaissance aircraft discovered the forces south of Jolfa moving towards Marand. It was possible for the Iranian 3rd Division under General Matboodi to move motorized infantry towards Shibli in order to halt the breakthrough, but due to being taken by surprise, he failed to make the proper counterattack. He also failed to destroy the bridges and highways with explosives, allowing the Soviets to rapidly move through the region. Five Iranian bombers were intercepted trying to attack the Soviet positions around Jolfa.

On 1 October 1941 the army was reported to include the 20th and 63rd Mountain Rifle Divisions, the 402nd Rifle Division, the 324th Mountain Rifle Regiment of the 77th Mountain Rifle Division, the 1st Mountain Cavalry Division (though listed as 1 кд not гкд in BSSA), and the 17th, 23rd and 24th Cavalry Divisions (кд).

By January 1942, the army was assigned to the Crimean Front, and fought in the Kerch Peninsula in Crimea, the Taman Peninsula and Caucasus region of southern Russia, in the Belgorod-Kharkov Offensive, and to the east of the Dnieper River in Ukraine until early 1944.

On 1 June 1942, the army's infantry comprised 32nd and 33rd Guards Rifle Division, 77th Mountain Rifle Division, and 103rd Rifle Brigade. Artillery assigned included 547th Cannon Artillery Regiment, 18th Guards Mortar Regiment, and additionally 40th Tank Brigade was part of the army. In March 1944, the 47th Army was subordinated to the 2nd Belorussian Front, and then moved to the 1st Belorussian Front in mid-April 1944 and fought as part of this force until the end of World War II in Europe. As part of the 1st BRF, the 47th Army fought in the Vistula-Oder Offensive, East Pomeranian Offensive, and the Berlin Offensive.

Key actions that the 47th Army took part in were the liberation of Kovel on July 6, 1944, forcing the Germans out of the Praga suburb of Warsaw on September 14, 1944, and achieving a junction with troops of the 1st Ukrainian Front on April 25, 1945, that completed the encirclement of Berlin.

The 47th Army in January 1945 had nine rifle divisions (77th Rifle Corps with 185th, 234th, 328th Rifle Divisions), 125th Rifle Corps (60th, 76th, 175th Rifle Divisions), 129th Rifle Corps (132nd, 143rd, 260th Rifle Divisions), 30th Guards Gun-artillery Brigade, 31st Anti-Aircraft Artillery Division with four anti-aircraft artillery regiments (1376th, 1380th, 1386th, and 1392nd) plus a separate anti-aircraft artillery regiment (1488th), 163rd Anti-Tank Artillery Regiment, 460th Mortar Regiment, 75th rocket launcher regiment, 70th Guards Independent Tank Regiment, four regiments of self-propelled guns, an armoured train unit, a DUKW truck battalion, an engineer-sapper brigade, and two flamethrower units.

The 47th Army was inactivated on February 5, 1946, in Halle, Germany, after taking part in the occupation of eastern Germany.

== Commanders ==
The following officers commanded the army during World War II.

- Major General Vasily Novikov (July – October 1941)
- Major General Konstantin Baranov (October 1941 – February 1942)
- Lieutenant General Stepan Chernyak (February 1942)
- Major General Konstantin Kolganov (February – May 1942)
- Major General Grigory Kotov (May – September 1942)
- Major General Andrei Grechko (September – October 1942)
- Lieutenant General Fyodor Kamkov (October 1942 – January 1943)
- Lieutenant General Konstantin Leselidze (January – March 1943)
- Major General Alexander Ryzhov (March – July 1943)
- Major General Pyotr Kozlov (July – August 1943)
- Lieutenant General Pavel Korzun (August – September 1943)
- Lieutenant General Filipp Zhmachenko (September – October 1943)
- Lieutenant General Vitaly Polenov (October 1943 – May 1944)
- Lieutenant General Nikolai Gusev (May – November 1944)
- Major General (promoted to Lieutenant General January 1945) Frants Perkhorovich (November 1944 – February 1946)
