= Tatarsk =

Tatarsk (Russian: Тата́рск) is the name of several urban and rural inhabited localities (towns, settlements, and villages) in Russia.

Urban localities

- Tatarsk, Novosibirsk Oblast, a town in Novosibirsk Oblast

Rural localities

- Tatarsk, Krasnoyarsk Krai, a settlement in Turukhansky District of Krasnoyarsk Krai
- Tatarsk, Smolensk Oblast, a village in Tatarskoye Rural Settlement of Monastyrshchinsky District of Smolensk Oblast
