= 45th Army (Soviet Union) =

- 45-я армия
- Active: 1941–1945
- Country: Soviet Union
- Branch: Red Army
- Size: Field army
- Garrison/HQ: Tbilisi

Commanders
- Notable commanders: Vasily Novikov; Fyodor Remezov

The 45th Army (Russian: 45-я армия) was a field army of the Red Army in World War II. Formed in late July 1941, the army spent most of the war guarding the Turkish border and disbanded in fall 1945.

== History ==
The 45th Army was formed in late July 1941 in the Transcaucasian Military District from the 23rd Rifle Corps. It included the 138th Mountain Rifle Division, 31st and 136th Rifle Divisions, 1st Mountain Cavalry Division, 55th Fortified Area and other units. The army's first commander was Konstantin Baranov. On 23 August, the army became part of the Transcaucasian Front. On 30 December 1941, it was subordinated to the Caucasian Front. The army guarded the Turkish border and covered Lend-Lease supply routes going through Iran. In October 1941 Andrei Alexandrovich Kharitonov became temporary commander of the army. Between December 1941 and April 1942 the army was led by Vasily Novikov. In April, Fyodor Remezov became the army's commander. He would command 45th Army for the rest of its existence.

The army was headquartered at Tbilisi. In July or August 1944, the 133rd Rifle Brigade became part of the army. The 116th Fortified Area joined the army in December 1944 or January 1945. Postwar, it became part of the Tbilisi Military District. In fall 1945, the army included the 261st Rifle Division at Leninakan, the 349th Rifle Division at Akhaltsikhe, and the 402nd Rifle Division at Batumi. The army also included five fortified areas: the 51st at Batumi, the 55th at Leninakan, the 69th at Echmiadzin, the 78th at Akhaltsikhe, and the 116th at Akhalkalaki. The army was disbanded in fall 1945.

Both its 12th and 13th Rifle Corps and a number of divisions (261st, 296th, 349th, 392nd, 402nd, 406th Rifle Divisions) existed for a long time, and some until the collapse of the Soviet Union. However, 349th Rifle Division was disbanded by 1946.

== Commanders ==
- Major General Konstantin Baranov (July - October 1941)
- Colonel Andrei A. Kharitonov (October - December 1941)
- Major General Vasily Novikov (December 1941 - April 1942)
- Lieutenant-General Fyodor Remezov (April 1942 - until the end of the war)
