= Transcaucasus Front =

Russian front during World War II

- Active: 23 August – 30 December 1941; 15 May 1942 – 25 August 1945
- Country: Soviet Union
- Branch: Red Army
- Type: Front
- Size: Several armies
- Engagements: World War II; Anglo-Soviet invasion of Iran; Battle of the Caucasus

Commanders
- Notable commanders: Dmitry Kozlov; Ivan Tyulenev

The Transcaucasus Front (Russian: Закавказский Фронт), also translated as Transcaucasian Front, was a front of the Soviet Red Army—a military formation comparable to an army group, not a geographic military front—during the Second World War.

The Transcaucasus Front describes two distinct organizations during the war.

== First creation ==
The first version was created on 23 August 1941 from the Transcaucasus Military District, which was originally formed in 1922. The boundary of the Front extended along the Soviet border with Turkey and along the Black Sea coast from Batumi to Tuapse.
It was commanded by Lieutenant-General Dmitry Kozlov from August 1941 to December 1941.

On 22 June 1941, when the German invasion started, the Transcaucasus Military District included the 3rd, 24th, and 40th Rifle Corps, the 28th Mechanised Corps, two cavalry divisions (the 17th Mountain and the 24th) and three separate rifle divisions (the 63rd, 76th, and 77th). Also part of the District were three fortified regions and District troops, which included artillery and NKVD frontier units.

The initial Front organization incorporated the four Soviet armies stationed in the district in June 1941:

- the 45th and 46th on the border with Turkey and
- the 44th and 47th on the border with Iran.

On 25 August 1941 troops from the Front entered Iran according to the Soviet-Iran Treaty of Friendship of 21 February 1921, which eliminated the direct threat to the Baku oil fields.

=== Order of Battle, Invasion of Iran, 1941 ===
Soviet OOB for 25 August 1941:

44th Army (Major General Alexander Khadeyev)

- 20th Mountain Rifle Division
- 77th Mountain Rifle Division
- 17th Cavalry Division
- 24th Tank Regiment

47th Army (Major General Vasily Novikov)

- 63rd Mountain Rifle Division
- 76th Mountain Rifle Division
- 236th Rifle Division
- 6th Tank Division
- 54th Tank Division
- 13th Motorcycle Regiment

53rd Army (Major General Sergei Trofimenko) (invaded Iran from Turkmenistan, Central Asian Military District, on 27 August)

- 58th Rifle Corps
- 83rd Mountain Rifle Division
- 4th Cavalry Corps

As part of the Central Asian Military District (not the TCF), 53rd Army was described by the Combat composition of the Soviet Army as including 58th Rifle Corps (68th and 83rd Mountain Rifle Divisions, 389th Rifle Division), 4th Cavalry Corps (18th, 20th, 39th Cavalry Divisions), 44th Cavalry Division, and 72nd Independent Mountain Rifle Regiment (огсп) on 1 October 1941.

On 1 November 1941 the front was listed in the Combat composition of the Soviet Army as including the 44th (five divisions), 45th (four divisions and 55th Fortified Region), 46th Army (9, 20th Mountain Rifle Division; 224, 388, 390th Rifle Divisions, 51st Fortified Region), and 47th Armies (five divisions), and forces of frontal subordination including the 61, 151, 223, 396th Rifle Divisions, and forces in Iran consisting of the 402nd Rifle Division, the 1st Mountain Cavalry Division, and the 23rd Cavalry Division.

In November 1941, the 51st Army joined the front after being evacuated from the Crimea.

The Transcaucasus Front was renamed the Caucasian Front on 30 December 1941.

== Second creation ==
The second version of this front was again created from the Transcaucasus Military District on 15 May 1942, and continued in existence until its reorganization as the Tbilisi Military District on 25 August 1945 after the end of the war.

It was commanded by General Ivan V. Tyulenev (May 1942 - August 1945), and included the 4th and 58th Armies at various periods.
