= 20th Rifle Division =

- Active: I Formation: 1919–1921 II Formation: 1944–1946 III Formation: 1955–1957
- Country: Soviet Union
- Branch: Red Army (1st and 2nd formations); Soviet Army (3rd formation)
- Type: Infantry
- Size: Division
- Engagements: Russian Civil War: Eastern Front of the Russian Civil War; Red Army invasion of Azerbaijan; Red Army invasion of Georgia; World War II: Operation Bagration; Gumbinnen Operation; East Prussian Offensive; Battle of Berlin; Prague Offensive
- Decorations: Order of the Red Banner (1st, 2nd and 3rd formations); Order of Suvorov (2nd formation)
- Battle honours: Baranovichi (2nd formation); Lower Dnieper (3rd formation)

Commanders
- Notable commanders: Adam Turchinsky Mikhail Movsesov

The 20th Rifle Division was an infantry division of the Soviet Red Army, formed three times. The first formation of the division lasted from 1919 to 1921 and fought during the Russian Civil War before its downsizing into a brigade. The brigade became the 3rd Caucasian Rifle Division, the 3rd Caucasian Mountain Rifle Division, and the 20th Mountain Rifle Division during the interwar years. In 1944 the 20th became the 20th Rifle Division again. It was disbanded after the end of the war. The division briefly reformed between 1955 and 1957 from the 188th Rifle Division and was converted into a motor rifle division.

== First Formation ==
The division was first formed as the Penza Infantry Division, which was formed by Order No. 9 of the 1st Army of the Eastern Front on 6 July 1918. Until 15 September 1918 it was known as the 1st Penza Infantry Division. By order of the Field Staff of the RVSR 1477 N / A on 16 March 1919, it was named the 20th Rifle Division. By an order of the Separate Caucasus Army on 13 October 1921, the division was disbanded and its headquarters used to form that of the 6th Separate Caucasian Rifle Brigade. The brigade was soon renumbered as the 3rd Separate Caucasian Rifle Brigade on 29 November of that year, and on 26 June 1922 became the 3rd Caucasian Rifle Division of the Separate Caucasus Army.

The division was renamed the 3rd Caucasian Mountain Rifle Division on 1 October 1931 and it was redesignated as the 20th Caucasian Mountain Rifle Division on 21 May 1936 to standardize its name.

It was awarded an Honorary Revolutionary Red Banner of the Central Executive Committee (1924), Order of the Red Banner. Was part of the 1st Army of the Eastern Front (July 1918 - October. 1919), 10th Army (Oct. 1919-Feb. 1920, March - April. 1920), under the operational control of the 1st Cavalry Army (Feb. - March 1920), 11th Army (May 1921 - Separate Caucasus Army, from August 1923 - Red Banner Caucasus Army) (April 1920 - May 1935), in the Transcaucasian Military District (May 1935).

== Second Formation ==
Formed during World War II on 21 April 1944 from the 20th Mountain Rifle Division. Fought at Krasnodar, Novorossiysk, Crimea, and near Berlin. With 28th Army of the 1st Ukrainian Front May 1945.

The division inherited the 20th Mountain Rifle Division's Order of the Red Banner, was awarded another Order of the Red Banner during the war, and received the honorific "Baranovichi". It was also awarded the Order of Suvorov 2nd class. Thus its final title was the 20th Baranovichi twice Red Banner Order of Suvorov Rifle Division. After the end of the war the division transferred to Lida with the 28th Army. It was disbanded before 1 July 1946.

== Third Formation ==
After the war, the 20th Rifle Division was reformed in 1955 from the 188th Rifle Division. It was disbanded on 17 April 1957 by being redesignated the 93rd Motor Rifle Division. (Feskov et al./Armies of the Bear) The division was based at Zaporizhia, Zaporizhia Oblast, under 25th Army Corps. The 93rd Motor Rifle Division was disbanded in 1959.

It should not be confused with the 93rd Guards Motor Rifle Division.
