= Transcaucasian Military District =

Soviet military area

- Location of the Transcaucasian Military District (red) in the Soviet Union, 1991
- Active: 1935 – September 1992 or December 1992
- Country: Soviet Union
- Type: Military district
- Part of: Soviet Armed Forces
- Headquarters: Tbilisi
- Engagements: World War II

Commanders
- Notable commanders: Fyodor Tolbukhin; Konstantin Rokossovsky; Igor Rodionov

The Transcaucasian Military District, a military district of the Soviet Armed Forces, traces its history to May 1921 and the incorporation of Armenia, Azerbaijan, and Georgia into the Soviet Union. It was disbanded by being redesignated as a Group of Forces in the early 1990s, after the Soviet Union collapsed. The military district formed as a basis of the modern day armed forces of Armenia, Azerbaijan, and Georgia as well as unrecognized polities of Abkhazia and South Ossetia.

== History ==
The Transcaucasian Military District was originally formed from the Red Army's Separate Caucasian Army, which became the Red Banner Caucasian Army in August 1923. On 17 May 1935, the Red Banner Caucasus Army was redesignated the Transcaucasian Military District. The Georgian, Armenian, and Azerbaijani national formations, plus units from the 11th Soviet Red Army, all joined the new district about this time.

In July 1936 the District's formations and units received designations according to the countrywide numbering scheme and became: the 9th (formerly 1st Caucasus) Mountain Rifle Division, named for the Central Executive Committee of the Georgian SSR; the 20th (formerly 3rd Caucasus) Mountain Rifle Division; the 47th (former 1st) Georgian Mountain Rifle Division, named for Joseph Stalin; the 63rd (former 2nd) Georgian Mountain Rifle Division, named for Mikhail Frunze; the 76th Armenian Mountain Rifle Division, named after Comrade Voroshilov, and the 77th Аzerbaijani Mountain Rifle Division, named for Grigoriy Ordzhonikidze.

On 22 June 1941 the District consisted of the 3rd (4th, 20th, and 47th Rifle Divisions), 23rd Rifle Corps (136th and 138th Rifle Divisions) and 40th Rifle Corps (9th and 31st Rifle Division), the 28th Mechanised Corps, which included the 6th and 54th Tank Divisions and the 236th Motorised Division, five unattached divisions – the 63rd, 76th, and 77th Rifle, the 17th Mountain Cavalry Division and the 24th Cavalry Division, and three fortified regions.

On 1 August 1941 the 46th Army was formed from the 3rd Rifle Corps headquarters. 45th Army was formed from the 23rd Rifle Corps. 45th and 46th Armies guarded the Turkish border. The 44th Army was formed from the 40th Rifle Corps and the 47th Army formed from the 27th Mechanized Corps. Both armies were deployed on the Iranian border. On 23 August, the military district became the Transcaucasus Front. District headquarters was subordinated to the front's military council and directed the formation of new units. It was disbanded on 14 September 1941.

On 28 January 1942, the military district was reformed when the Caucasian Front was divided into the Transcaucasian Military District and the Crimean Front. The district was commanded by Ivan Tyulenev and included the 45th and 46th Armies, as well as 4 rifle divisions and a rifle brigade. On 28 April 1942, the district became the second formation of the Transcaucasian Front.

On 9 July 1945, the Tbilisi and Baku Military Districts were formed from the Transcaucasian Front. Tbilisi Military District Headquarters was in Tbilisi and was formed from the Transcaucasian Front headquarters. The district controlled forces in the Georgian and Armenian SSRs. The district was commanded by Colonel General Sergei Trofimenko, former 27th Army commander. The headquarters of the Baku Military District was formed from 69th Army headquarters and was located in Baku. The district controlled forces in the Azerbaijan SSR and Dagestan ASSR. It was commanded by Colonel general Vladimir Kolpakchi, former 69th Army commander. In October 1945, Army General Ivan Maslennikov took command. On 15 November 1945, control of forces in the Nakhichevan ASSR was transferred from the Tbilisi Military District to the Baku Military District. Lieutenant General Mikhail Ozimin became Tbilisi Military District commander in April 1946. In May 1946, both districts became part of the Transcaucasus Military District (ZakVO), commanded by Maslennikov.

Sometime in the first half of 1946, a new air army, the 7th, was established in the Baku Military District. The air army was given the designation 7th Air Army, taking up a previous designation of a formation which was becoming the 3rd Air Army of the Long Range Aviation in the Far East. Initially it included the 8th Guards Fighter Aviation Division; 309th Fighter Aviation Division; 236th and 259th Fighter Aviation Divisions; the 3rd Guards Fighter Aviation Corps with the 13th and 14th Guards Fighter Aviation Divisions; the 188th Bomber Aviation Division; and the 199th Assault Aviation Division, disbanded April 1946. In February 1949 the 7th Air Army was redesignated the 62nd Air Army. As of 2 January 1950 the 7th Air Army became part of the Baku Air Defence Region, and quickly thereafter became the 42nd Fighter Air Army of the Air Defence Forces.

On 1 May 1955 Soviet forces opposite Eastern Turkey included 13th Mountain Rifle Corps in Georgia (two mountain, one rifle divisions); 7th Guards Combined Arms Army in Armenia with 19th Mountain Rifle Corps (two mountain divisions) and 22nd Rifle Corps with 26th Mechanised Division and two rifle divisions. Further away was 4th Combined Arms Army in Azerbaijan, with five more divisions, of which two were mechanised.

In 1979 Scott and Scott reported the District' headquarters address as Tbilisi-4, Ulitsa Dzneladze, Dom 46. The District became part of the Southern Direction, headquartered in Baku and including the North Caucasus and Turkestan Military Districts, in the late 1970s and early 1980s.

== Commanders ==
=== Commanders of the Transcaucasian Military District (1935–1941) ===
- Komandarm 2nd rank Mikhail Lewandowski (May 1935 – June 1937)
- Komkor Nikolay Kuibyshev (June 1937 – February 1938)
- Marshal of the Soviet Union Alexander Yegorov (February 1938)
- Komkor (Komandarm 2nd Rank February 1939, Army General June 1940) Ivan Tyulenev (February 1938 – August 1940)
- Lieutenant General Mikhail Yefremov (August 1940 – January 1941)
- Lieutenant General Dmitry Kozlov (January–August 1941)
- Lieutenant General Vladimir Lvov (August–September 1941)

=== Commanders of the Transcaucasian Military District (1946–1992) ===
- Maslennikov, Ivan (1946–1947), Army General;
- Tolbukhin, Fyodor Ivanovich (1947–1949), Marshal of the Soviet Union;
- Antonov, Alexei Innokentevich (1950–1954), Army General;
- Fedyuninsky, Ivan (1954–1957), Colonel General on 8 August 1955 – Army General;
- Rokossowski, Konstantin (1957), Marshal of the Soviet Union;
- Galitski, Kuzma N. (1958–1961), Army General;
- Stuchenko, Andrei Trofimovich (1961–1968), Colonel General, on 13 April 1964 – Army General;
- Kurkotkin, Semyon Konstantinovich (1968–1971), Colonel General;
- Melnikov, Pavel Vasilyevich (October 1971 – 1978), Colonel General (ru:Мельников, Павел Васильевич);
- Koulishev Oleg Fyodorovich (1978 – August 1983), Colonel General;
- Arkhipov, Vladimir Mikhailovich (August 1983 – July 1985), Colonel General;
- Kochetov, Konstantin Alekseevich (July 1985 – May 1988), Colonel General, on 29 April 1988 – Army General;
- Rodionov, Igor (May 1988 – August 1989), Colonel General;
- Patrikeev Valery Anisimovich (August 1989 – 26 September 1992), Colonel General;
- Reut, Fyodor (September–December 1992)

=== Commanders of the Group of Russian Forces of the Transcaucasus ===
- Reut, Fyodor (1993–1997), Colonel General
- Andreyev, Vladimir (1997–2000), Colonel General
- Zolotov, Nikolay (August 2000–), General Lieutenant

== Forces in the late 1980s ==
In 1988, dispositions within the District were as follows:

- 171st Guards District Training Centre, Tbilisi - disbanded June 1992
- 7th Guards Army, HQ Yerevan, Armenian SSR - disbanded 14 August 1992
  - 15th Motor Rifle Division, Kirovakan - disbanded June 1992. The equipment was partly handed over to Armenia - traditions, honors and awards were transferred to the 5209th Weapons and Equipment Storage Base (Nizhneudinsk, Transbaikal Military District).
  - 127th Motor Rifle Division, Leninakan (now Russian 102nd Military Base)
  - 164th Motor Rifle Division, Yerevan - disbanded June 1992.
  - 7th Fortified Area, Leninakan
  - 9th Fortified Area, Echmiadzin
- 4th Army, HQ Baku, Azerbaijan SSR
  - 23rd Guards Motor Rifle Division, Kirovabad
    - 366th Guards Motor Rifle Regiment, Stepanakert
    - 368th Guards Motor Rifle Regiment, Kirovabad
    - 370th Guards Motor Rifle Regiment, Kirovabad
    - 131st Guards Tank Regiment, Kirovabad
    - 1071st Artillery Regiment, Kirovabad
    - 1057th Anti-Aircraft Missile Regiment, Kirovabad
  - 60th Motor Rifle Division, Lenkoran
  - 75th Motor Rifle Division, Nakhichevan
  - 295th Motor Rifle Division, Baku - disbanded June 1992.
- 31st Army Corps, HQ Kutaisi, Georgian SSR
  - 10th Guards Motor Rifle Division, Akhaltsikhe, Georgian SSR
  - 145th Motor Rifle Division, Batumi, Adjara
  - 147th Motor Rifle Division, Akhalkalaki, Georgian SSR
  - 152nd Motor Rifle Division (mobilisation) Kutaisi, Georgian SSR
  - 6th Fortified Area (Akhaltsikhe, Georgian SSR)
  - 8th Fortified Area (Batumi (Erge), Adzharskaya ASSR)
- 21st Air Assault Brigade, Kutaisi, Georgian SSR
  - 325th Separate Helicopter Regiment – (Tsulukidze now Khoni) Mi-8Т, Mi-6
- 793rd Separate Helicopter Regiment – Telavi Mi-8Т, Mi-6

In addition, the 104th Guards Airborne Division of the Soviet Airborne Forces was stationed at Kirovabad, directly subordinated to VDV Headquarters. The division was withdrawn to Ulyanovsk and this process was in progress by spring 1993.

The 75th Motor Rifle Division was reassigned to the KGB Border Guards in January 1990. On September 23, 1991, on the basis of the directive of the General Staff of August 28, 1991 No. 314/3/042Sh, it was returned to the Ministry of Defence.

In February 1992, Russian president Boris Yeltsin sent General Boris Gromov, First Deputy Commander-in-Chief of the Ground Forces, and Admiral Vladimir Chernavin, Commander-in-Chief of the Navy, to negotiate military issues with Azerbaijan. As a result, Azerbaijan received a helicopter squadron, the Baku Combined Arms Command School, and a large part of the Rear Services (combat service support) units of the Fourth Army.

=== 34th Air Army ===
The Soviet Air Forces' presence in the district consisted of the 34th Air Army. It was established in Tbilisi as the 11th Air Army in 1946, redesignated as the 34th Air Army in 1949, redesignated the Air Forces of the Transcaucasian Military District (VVS ZKVO) in 1980, and then given the name 34th Air Army again in 1988. It was made up of the 36th Bomber Aviation Division, 283rd Fighter Aviation Division and six independent aviation regiments, totaling twelve aviation regiments. The formation's Military Unit Number was 21052.

Army composition:

- 80th Separate Assault Aviation Regiment – Sitalchay Military Airbase, Sukhoi Su-25 "Frogfoot" - seized by Azeri troops in August 1992
- 313th Separate Reconnaissance Aviation Regiment Berlin Order of the Red Banner, Order of Kutuzov' Vaziani Su-17R (former 93rd Separate Observation and Reconnaissance Aviation Regiment)
- 882nd Separate Reconnaissance Regiment – Dollyar Su-24МR, MiG-25RB
- 36th Bomber Aviation Division – Bolshoye Shiraki
  - 34th Bomber Aviation Regiment 'Tashkent Red Banner, Order of Kutuzov' Kirovabad Su-24 (Russian: 34 бап)
  - 143rd Bomber Aviation Regiment – Kopitnari Su-24М
  - 168th Separate Guards Bomber Regiment – Shiraki Su-24M
  - 976th Bomber Aviation Regiment Insterburg Orders of Suvorov and Kutuzov Kyurdamir Air Base Su-24, Su-17 (former 976th Fighter Aviation Regiment)
- 283rd Kamyshin Red Banner Fighter Aviation Division (Vaziani; 283 инад) (Military Unit Number 06941)
  - 176th Fighter Aviation Regiment 'Berlin Red Banner' Miha Tskhakaya (Tskhakaia) MiG-29 (в/ч 42080)
  - 841st Guards Fighter Aviation Regiment 'Baranovichsk Red Banner, Order of Suvorov' Meria (Makharadze) Su-17 (30 гв. иап 1945)
  - 982nd Fighter Aviation Regiment – Vaziani (Rustavi) MiG-23MLD (982 FAR 1945) (в/ч 40501)

The Soviet Air Defence Forces had the 19th Army of Air Defence Forces located in the District.

== Russian Transcaucasus Group of Forces ==
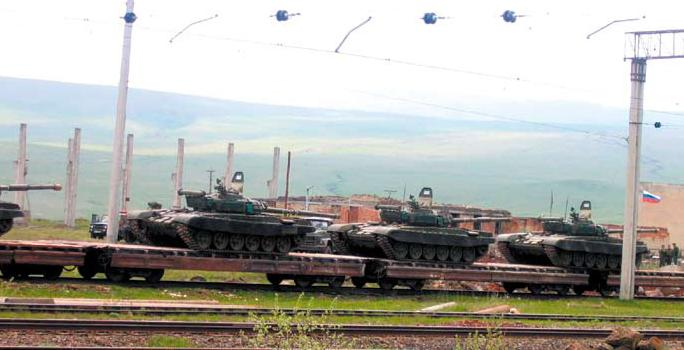
Russian troops leaving Georgia in 2007

By Ukaz No. 260 of the president of the Russian Federation of 19 March 1992 the Soviet Transcaucasian Military District and the Caspian Flotilla were transferred to the jurisdiction of the Russian Federation.

On 26 September 1992 the district was disbanded. Another, earlier report said on 1 January 1993, the District became the Group of Russian Forces in the Transcaucasus (Russian Группа российских войск в Закавказье – ГРВЗ; GRVZ). After many of the divisions listed above had disbanded or become part of the former republics' armed forces, in the mid 1990s the GRVZ's dispositions were:

- Headquarters, Tbilisi
- 12th Military Base, Batumi, Adjara AR, Georgia
- 62nd Military Base, Akhalkalaki, Samtskhe-Javakheti, Georgia. Former 147th Motor Rifle Division. In October 1999, the base had: – personnel – 1,964 servicemen – equipment – 41 MBT, 114 AIFV/APC (BMP and BTR); 46 various military vehicles; 61 artillery systems; and 2 pontoon-bridging vehicles. The base includes the 409th and 412th motor-rifle regiments; the 817th artillery regiment; the 889th communication battalion; and the 65th artillery detachment.
- 102nd Military Base, Gyumri, Armenia
- 137th Military Base, Vaziani Military Base, Georgia (former 171st Guards District Training Centre) In October 1999, it was reported to have the 405th Motor Rifle Regiment with 773 servicemen; 31 MBT; 70 AIFV/APC; 16 artillery systems; and one pontoon-bridging vehicle; the 566th communication battalion – 193 servicemen; 5 mobile radio stations P-145BM; and the 311th Separate Helicopter Squadron – 161 servicemen, 5 Mi-24 attack helicopters and 5 Mi-8MT transport helicopters. The 405th MRR had been absorbed from the 10th Guards Motor Rifle Division formerly headquartered in Kutaisi.
- 142nd Tank Repair Factory, Tbilisi. In October 1999, it was reported to have 20 servicemen; and equipment including 28 MBT (T-72), 103 AIFV/APC and two self-propelled howitzers 2C3 "Acatsia".
- Khelvachauri-based (Adjaria) military depot. In October 1999, it had 56 servicemen. 29 AIFV – 5 BMP-1 and 24 BMP-2 – were stored there.
- Other smaller formations and units, including an independent helicopter squadron

General Major Aleksander Studenikin, former deputy commander of the Moscow Military District's 20th Army, commanded the Group in 2004 with General (Major?) Andrei Popov as his deputy.

The Russian presence at Vaziani was withdrawn in the late 1990s and an agreement over the withdrawal of the 12th and 62nd Bases by 2007–08 was made in 2005. The Akhalkalaki 62nd base was officially transferred on schedule to Georgia on 27 June 2007. The 12th Military Base in Batumi was transferred earlier than scheduled; scheduled for February 2008, it was transferred on 13 November 2007. The 'Zvezda' command post (probably the former District war headquarters) in the town of Mtskheta, just north of Tbilisi, was handed over by early September 2005. Due to the espionage conflict between Russia and Georgia, the Transcaucasus Group of Forces headquarters in Tbilisi was closed down ahead of schedule. Defence Minister Sergey Ivanov said that 387 servicemen and 484 civilians would leave early. Lenta.ru referred to Rian.ru.

Even after the GRVZ was totally withdrawn, Russian troops continue to remain in peacekeeping roles in Abkhazia and South Ossetia, de jure parts of Georgia. There are about 1,600 men on the Abkhazian-Georgian boundary (serving alongside UNOMIG) and a battalion in South Ossetia. According to the Russian authorities, the Gudauta military base is also now used by the peacekeeping forces, but no international monitoring has ever been allowed there.

== See also ==
- ru:Раздел Вооружённых сил СССР - division of the Armed Forces of the USSR, with reference to the situation in the Transcaucasus
