= Boevoi sostav Sovetskoi armii =

Boevoi sostav Sovetskoi armii ("Combat composition of the Soviet army") is an official Second World War Soviet Army order of battle published in five parts from 1963 through 1990 by the Voroshilov Academy of the General Staff and Voenizdat.

Entries detailing the order of battle are arranged by month from June 1941 through May 1945 and for August 1945. The monthly entries are divided into four sections. These divide the forces into those actually engaged in combat operations, strategic air defense forces, Reserve of the Supreme High Command (Stavka reserve forces (RVGK)), and forces assigned to other fronts, theaters, and military districts.

For each of the four sections, the order of battle is sorted into categories as rifle, artillery, tank, aviation, and engineer units. Totals for types of units are provided by organization (front or military district), and by month.

== English-language bibliographical listings ==
David Glantz's Colossus Reborn lists the work in primary-source material as:

- Boevoi sostav Sovetskoi armii, chast' 1 (iiun'-dekabr' 1941 goda) [The combat composition of the Soviet Army, part 1 (June–December 1941)]. Moscow: Voroshilov Academy of the General Staff, 1963. Classified secret.
- Boevoi sostav Sovetskoi armii, chast' 2 (ianvar'-dekabr' 1942 goda) [The combat composition of the Soviet Army, part 2 (January–December 1941[sic])]. (Note: The description should read "part 2 (January–December 1942)".) Moscow: Voenizdat, 1966. Classified secret.
- Boevoi sostav Sovetskoi armii, chast' 3 (ianvar'-dekabr' 1943 goda) [The combat composition of the Soviet Army, part 3 (January–December 1943)]. Moscow: Voenizdat, 1972. Classified secret.
- Boevoi sostav Sovetskoi armii, chast' 4 (ianvar'-dekabr' 1944 goda) [The combat composition of the Soviet Army, part 4 (January–December 1944)]. Moscow: Voenizdat, 1988. Classified secret.

The fifth and final part was published in 1990 by Voenizdat. The former secret classification of the publication is no longer

== Sources ==
- David Glantz. 2005. Colossus Reborn. Lawrence: University Press of Kansas. ISBN 0-7006-1353-6.
