= 34th Motor Rifle Division =

Motor rifle division of the Soviet military

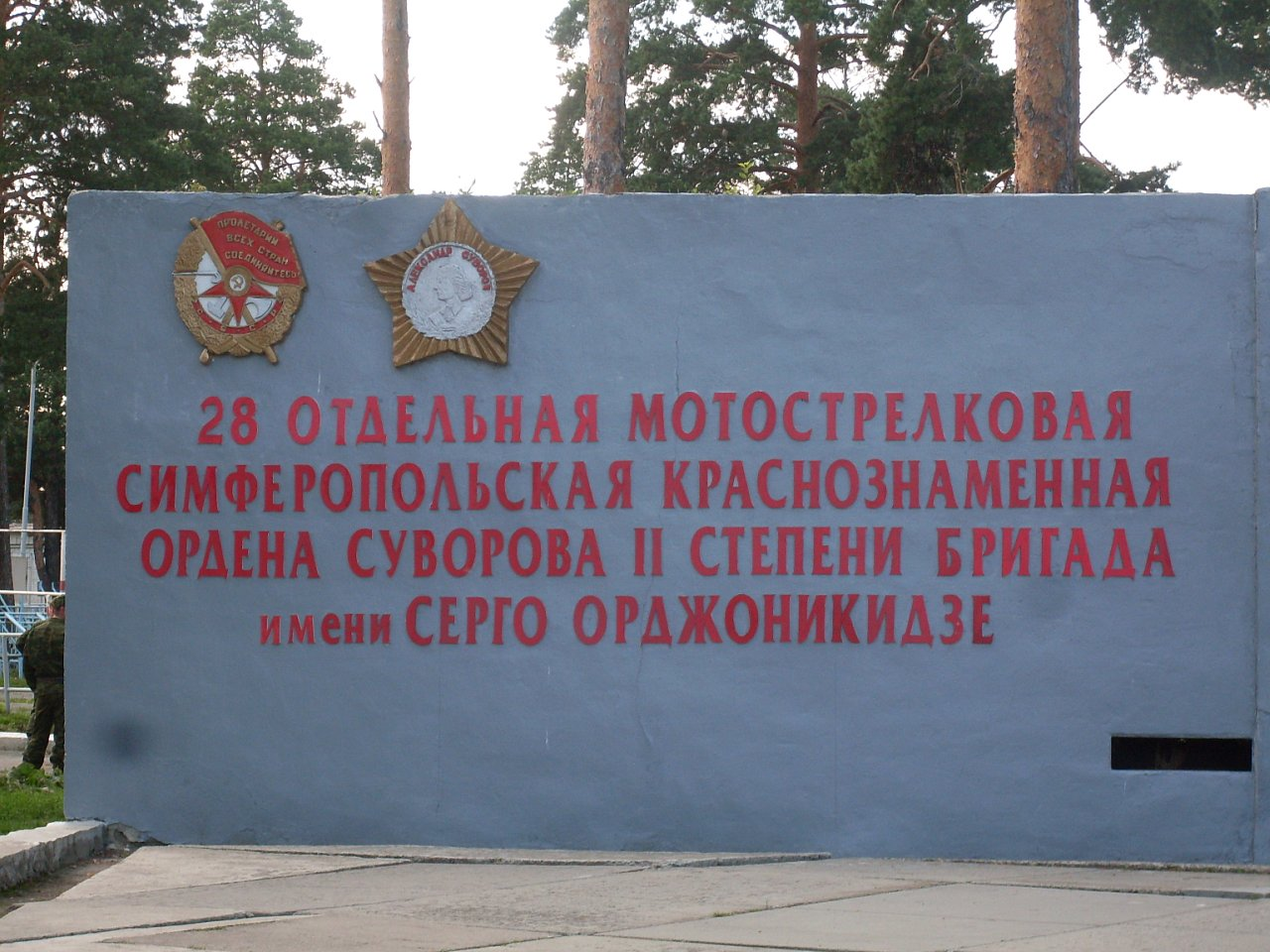
Memorial wall to the division's successor at 32nd military townlet, Yekaterinburg

The 34th Simferopol Red Banner Order of Suvorov Motor Rifle Division named after S. Ordzhonikidze (Military Unit Number 45463) was a unit of the Soviet Ground Forces and later the Russian Ground Forces. It was converted from the 126th Motor Rifle Division (First Formation) in 1965 and disbanded in 2009.

== History ==
It was formed by the order of the troops of the 11th Army of the Caucasian Front No. 193 of 11 May 1920 and the People's Navy Commissariat of the Azerbaijan SSR No. 48 of 16 May 1920. It was ordered to form as the "1st Consolidated Azerbaijan Workers' and Peasants Soviet Rifle Division". By a Prikaz of the NKO, No. 072 of 21 May 1936, the division became the 77th Azerbaijani Mountain Rifle Red Banner Division named for Sergei Ordzhonikidze. On 16 July 1940 it lost the Azerbaijani designation when the Red Army abolished national divisions. It was converted to the 77th Rifle Division in June 1942. It fought in Caucasus and Crimea and in the vicinity of Riga and Memel. With 51st Army of the Kurland Group (Leningrad Front) May 1945.

After a number of reorganizations (1957 onwards as 126 MRD), it became the 34th Motor Rifle Division in 1965. It spent the Cold War based at Sverdlovsk, Sverdlovsk Oblast, in the Urals Military District. The division's structure in 1989-90 included the 341st Tank Regt, 105th, 276th, and 324th MRRs, and the 239th Artillery Regiment.

During the First Chechen War, soldiers from the 15th Guards Tank Division were detached to serve in Chechnya with the 276th and 324th Motor Rifle Regiments of the 34th Motor Rifle Division. As the 34th was a low-readiness division with few personnel (the 324th had only four personnel permanently assigned), both regiments had to draw on personnel from the entire Ural Military District before deploying to Chechnya.

Sergey Surovikin became the divisional commander after 2002. It then became the 28th Motor Rifle Brigade in the city, now named Yekaterinburg, in 2009. On 30 May 2016, the brigade was transferred to Klintsy, Bryansk Oblast and reorganized into the 488th Motor Rifle Regiment of the 144th Motor Rifle Division.

== Notes ==
=== Bibliography ===
- Michael Holm, 34th Motor Rifle Division
- Feskov, V.I.; Golikov, V.I.; Kalashnikov, K.A.; Slugin, S.A. (2013). Вооруженные силы СССР после Второй Мировой войны: от Красной Армии к Советской [The Armed Forces of the USSR after World War II: From the Red Army to the Soviet: Part 1 Land Forces] (in Russian). Tomsk: Scientific and Technical Literature Publishing. ISBN 9785895035306.
- Efim Sandler, Battle for Grozny, Volume 1: Prelude and the Way to the City: First Chechen War 1994 (Helion Europe @ War No. 31), 2023. ISBN 9781804512142
