= North Caucasus Military District =

- Северо-Кавказский военный округ
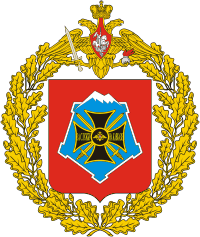
- North Caucasus Military District Coat of Arms
- Founded: 4 May 1918
- Country: Soviet Union (1918–1991) (Russia) Russian Federation (1991 – 1 September 2010)
- Branch: Russian Ground Forces
- Type: Military district
- Part of: Ministry of Defence
- Headquarters: Rostov-on-Don
- Decorations: Order of the Red Banner

Commanders
- Notable commanders: Anatoly Kvashnin; Jan Lufi

The North Caucasus Military District was a military district of the Russian Armed Forces from 1992–2010. Before 1992 it had been part of the Soviet Armed Forces since 1918. In 2010 it became the Southern Military District and lately also included the Black Sea Fleet and Caspian Flotilla.

It comprised the Republic of Adygeya, the Republic of Dagestan, the Republic of Ingushetia, the Kabardino-Balkar Republic, the Republic of Kalmykia, the Karachay–Cherkess Republic, the Republic of North Osetia-Alaniya, the Chechen Republic, Krasnodar Krai, Stavropol Krai, and Astrakhan, Volgograd, and Rostov oblasts. It has the same borders as the Southern Federal District. Its last commander was Lieutenant General Alexander Galkin, appointed from January 2010.

== History ==
Boundaries of the North Caucasus Military District (in red) on 1 January 1989

The District was originally established on 4 May 1918, and reorganized as a field formation during the Russian Civil War. The First Cavalry Army was formed in the District in November 1919.

On 4 May 1921, the field headquarters of the 1st Cavalry Army was used to form the headquarters of the North Caucasus Military District (2nd formation). However, troops remained subordinated to the 1st Cavalry Army staff until its dissolution on 11 October 1923. District headquarters ended up at Rostov. Kliment Voroshilov was made district commander. During the 1920s and 1930s, the District became home to many training establishments, which were to multiply greatly during the Second World War.

In June 1941 the district's first line troops comprised the 64th Rifle Corps commanded by Major General A.D. Kuleshov with the 165th and 175th Rifle Divisions, the 26th Mechanised Corps with the 52nd and 56th Tank Divisions and the 103rd Mechanised Division, the 28th Mountain Rifle Division, and the 157th Rifle Division. The 19th Army was formed in the District in May–June 1941 under former district commander Ivan Konev and was engaged against the Germans from the beginning of Operation Barbarossa. 50th and 53rd Cavalry Divisions were also formed here, joining the Soviet Western Front.

Later the District saw battles around Rostov in November 1941 where the Germans suffered defeat, and the Battle of Stalingrad, which has been described as the most ferocious battle to date. Following the conclusion of the Battle of the Caucasus, the North Caucasian Front and the headquarters of the 56th Army were disbanded in accordance with a Supreme Command directive of the 20 November 1943. The Independent Coastal Army was formed, for the second time, on their base.

The 68th, 76th, 77th, 78th, 79th, 80th, 81st, 82nd and 83rd Naval Rifle Brigades were formed in the district after a November–December 1941 People's Commissariat for Defence resolution.

Immediately following the war, to demobilize the force, on 9 July 1945 the territory was split into three military districts: Don, Stavropol, and the Kuban.

- The Stavropol Military District consisted of Stavropol Krai, Grozny Oblast, Kabardino-Balkar ASSR, and the North Ossetian Autonomous Soviet Socialist Republic. Holm writes the district headquarters was formed in July 1945 from the headquarters of the 59th Combined Arms Army and HQ 1st Guards Horse-Mechanised Group. The 19th Rifle Division arrived in the district in late 1945. In accordance with an order of the Central Group of Forces (the Soviet garrison in Austria and Czechoslovakia), the 252nd Rifle Division was transported by rail to the Soviet Union via Kaposvár, Budapest, Sighet, Rostov, and Mineralnye Vody, with the rest of the 23rd Rifle Corps from 20 December 1945. On arrival the 23rd Rifle Corps was renumbered as the 60th Rifle Corps. By February 15, 1946 the 252nd Rifle Division had fully arrived in the Stavropol Military District (merged into the North Caucasus Military District shortly afterwards).
- The Kuban Military District comprised the territory of Krasnodar Krai (formed by the headquarters of the 60th Army). The Kuban Military District comprised the 29th Rifle Corps (73rd, 102nd Rifle Division and 217th Rifle Divisions), as well as the 9th Rifle Division. By summer 1946 the 29th Rifle Corps had been reduced to commanding the 8th, 9th, and 39th Independent Rifle Brigades. They were reexpanded into divisions in 1951.
- The Don Military District was located in the territory of the Rostov, Stalingrad, and Astrakhan Oblasts. The staff of the Don Military District was located in Rostov-on-Don, and was considered the heir of the traditions of the North Caucasus Military District. Among the formations in the Don Military District was the 6th Rifle Corps, which had arrived from Latvia in 1945. In early 1946 its three rifle divisions were reduced to independent rifle brigades (the 15th, 18th, and 46th, though the 15th disbanded in 1947).

In 1946 the Don Military District was renamed again as the North Caucasian Military District. The official Russian military website notes the work of the soldiers of the district in helping repair the ravages of the war.

The important Kapustin Yar test range was created in the District following the war.

In 1955 the district's forces included the 6th Rifle Corps (68th Mechanised Division and 372nd, soon to become 68th, Rifle Division). Other forces included the 29th Rifle Corps, 9th Rifle, 19th Rifle, 24th Guards Rifle, 46th Rifle, and 73rd Mountain Rifle Division, and the 1st Guards Tank Division.

In 1957 the 12th Rifle Corps became the 12th Army Corps (Soviet Union). At the time it controlled the 42nd Guards Motor Rifle Division and the 92nd Motor Rifle Division (Ordzhonikidze, Severo-Osetinskaya ASSR), which became the 19th MRD in 1964. In 1957 the 29th Rifle Corps became the 29th Army Corps (9th and 73rd Motor Rifle Divisions), but eleven years later it was moved to Belogorsk, Amur Oblast, in the Far East Military District. In addition, there was the 18th Guards Heavy Tank Division at Novocherkassk.

The 18th Guards HTD was involved in the Novocherkassk massacre in 1962. During the massacre, as the first deputy commander of the North Caucasian Military District, Lieutenant General Matvey Shaposhnikov refused to comply with the order to attack the demonstrators with tanks. Shaposhnikov was later expelled from the Communist Party for his criticism of the massacre.

The District was awarded the Order of the Red Banner in 1968.

In 1974 the 14th Tank Division was established at Novocherkassk, to replace the 51st Tank Division which was moving to Mongolia.

In 1979 Scott and Scott reported the District's HQ address as Rostov-na-Donu 18, Ulitsa Tekucheva, Dom 135.

In 1980 the 12th Army Corps controlled the 9th Motor Rifle Division (Maykop), the 156th Motor Rifle Division (mobilisation) (Novorossiysk), and the 113th Motor Rifle Division (mobilisation) at Goryachiy Klyuch, Krasnodar Krai. The 113th Motor Rifle Division was formed in 1978, and in 1981 moved to Molkino, Krasnodar Krai. The same year, the 34th Army Corps controlled the 82nd Motor Rifle Division (Volvograd) and 197th Motor Rifle Division (Uryupinsk).

In August 1982 the 42nd Army Corps (ru:42-й армейский корпус (СССР)) was formed in Ordzhonikidze in North Ossetia. It was assigned the 19th and 268th (cadre) Motor Rifle Divisions.

== Formations at the end of the 1980s ==
In the District in 1988–89 were the 128th cadre Air Assault Brigade at Stavropol, subordinated directly to Army General Nikolai Ivanovich Popov and his High Command of the Southern Military Direction at Baku; several divisions (14th Tank; 110th Guards Artillery; 173rd Guards District Training Centre); other smaller formations and units all under district control; plus the formations and units in the 12th, 34th, and 42nd Army Corps.

Headquarters and staff of the district were at Rostov-on-Don.

=== Ground Forces ===
- 14th Tank Division (Novocherkassk)
- 110th Guards Artillery Perekop Order of Kutuzov Division (Buinaksk) - established in 1966 by being upgraded from the 32nd Guards Howitzer Artillery Brigade of High Power.
- 160th Motor Rifle Division of the cadre; in 1989, it was reorganized into the 4770th Base for Storage of Weapons and Equipment (VKhVT). (Yeisk)
- 259th Reserve Motor Rifle Division of the cadre (Grozny)
- 239th Cadre Rear Guard Division (Volgograd)
- 47th Guards Rocket Zaporozhye-Odessa Order of Lenin, Red Banner, Orders of Suvorov and Kutuzov Brigade (Maikop)
- 1st Rocket Brigade (Yeysk)
- The 102nd Anti-Aircraft Rocket Brigade (the brigade arrived from the Siberian Military District in 1988.) (Eagle-Emerald)
- 179th Anti-Aircraft Rocket Brigade (Yeisk)
- 201st Self-Propelled Artillery Brigade (Slavyansk-on-Kuban)
- 227th artillery brigade of high power (Slavyansk-on-Kuban)
- 11th Separate Communications Brigade of the High Command (Novocherkassk)
- 51st Separate Communications Brigade GKVYUN (Rostov-on-Don)
- 131st Radio Engineering Brigade OSNAZ (Rostov-on-Don)
- 128th separate airborne assault brigade of the GKVYUN (cadre) (Stavropol)
- 121st Engineer Brigade (Kamensk-Shakhtinsky)
- 3rd Road Commandant Brigade (Rostov-on-Don)
- 75th brigade of material support (Novocherkassk)
- 21st Chemical Protection Brigade (g Frolovo)
- 71st Separate Electronic Warfare Regiment (Aksay)
- 102nd Separate Electronic Warfare Regiment (Mozdok)
- 106th Separate Communications Regiment (Aksay)
- 433rd separate engineer-sapper battalion ( Aksai)
- 408th separate pontoon-bridge battalion (Kamensk-Shakhtinsky)
- 545th Separate Road Engineering Battalion ( Aksai)
- 121st Separate Electronic Warfare Battalion (Grozny)
- 860th separate flamethrower battalion (st. Bagaevskaya)
- 72nd communications center (Rostov-on-Don)
- 799th separate company of the GRU special forces (Novocherkassk)

Training and reserve formations of district subordination

- 283rd Reserve Anti-Aircraft Artillery Brigade (Yeisk)
- 254th Reserve Anti-Aircraft Artillery Brigade
- 260th reserve anti-tank artillery brigade
- 1619th separate training battalion of communications
- 236th separate training tank repair battalion (Millerovo)
- 173rd Guards District Training Yevpatoriya Red Banner Training Center for Junior Specialists (Motorized Rifle Troops) (Grozny)

Repair enterprises, property storage bases and warehouses of district subordination

- 50th car repair plant
- 234th mobile repair plant
- 682nd mobile repair plant
- 186th as-B;
- 744th AB-B (Novocherkassk)
- 2699th automobile warehouse
- 125th BRT
- 91st Communications Repair and Storage Base (Kropotkin)
- 2013 property storage base (Maikop)
- 92nd engineering warehouse (Georgievsk)
- 4770th base for storage of weapons and equipment (Yeisk)

12th Army Corps

- Corps Headquarters, 411th separate security and support company (Krasnodar)
- 9th Motorized Rifle Division of the Krasnodar Red Banner Order of Kutuzov and the Red Star Division named after the Supreme Soviet of the Georgian SSR (Maikop), Commander Dorofeev, Alexander Anatolyevich
- 113th Motor Rifle Division of the cadre (Hot Key)
- 880th Territorial Training Centre (Novorossiysk) (156th Motor Rifle Division was reorganized into the 880th TUTC in 1987. In 1989, the 880th TTC was reorganized into the 5383rd VKhVT.
- 99th Missile Brigade (Krasnodar)
- 291st Artillery Order of the Suvorov Brigade (Maikop), Commander Markaryan, Pyotr Oganezovich.
- 214th Engineer-Sapper Proskurovskaya Red Banner, orders of Bohdan Khmelnitsky and the Red Star Brigade
- material support team (Krasnodar)
- 943rd Reactive Artillery Regiment (Maikop)
- 1128th anti-tank artillery regiment (Maikop)
- 162nd Engineer Regiment (Krasnodar)
- 573rd Separate Reconnaissance Artillery Battalion (Maikop)
- 64th separate communications battalion (Krasnodar)
- 170th separate air defense radio engineering battalion (Krasnodar)
- 444th Separate Electronic Warfare Battalion (Krasnodar)
- 5157th repair and restoration base (Slavyansk-on-Kuban)

34th Army Corps

- Corps Headquarters (Volgograd), chief of staff of the corps Myachin L. S. (1986–1988)
- 82nd Motor Rifle Division (Volgograd) In 1990, the 82nd Motor Rifle Division was reorganized into the 6654th Equipment Storage Base.
- 345th Training Road Construction Brigade (Uryupinsk) (1966: 197th Motor Rifle Division, Cadre; 1987: 881st Training Centre; 1988: training road construction brigade. Transferred to the Federal Road Construction Administration (ru:Федеральное_дорожно-строительное_управление).
- 81st Cannon Artillery Tallinn Red Banner, Order of the Suvorov Brigade (Uryupinsk)
- brigade of material support (Volgograd)
- 264th Anti-Tank Artillery Regiment (Kalachev)
- 623rd separate communications battalion (Volgograd)
- 138th separate battalion of radiation and chemical reconnaissance (Volgograd)
- 4th Separate Chemical Defense Battalion (Frolovo)
- separate engineer sapper battalion (Volgograd)
- 539th Separate Electronic Warfare Battalion (Volgograd)
- separate air defense radio engineering battalion (Volgograd)
- separate repair and restoration battalion (Uryupinsk)
- 1616th repair and restoration base (Volgograd)
- 794th separate company of the GRU special forces

42nd Army Corps

- Corps Headquarters, 922nd Separate Security and Support Company (Vladikavkaz)
- 19th Motorized Rifle Division Voronezh-Shumlinskaya Red Banner, Orders of Suvorov and the Red Banner of Labor Division (Vladikavkaz)
- 887th Territorial Training Centre (Prokhladny)(Reorganized from the 268th Motor Rifle Division (Cadre) in December 1987. In 1989 to the 5853rd Equipment Storage Base.
- 485th Cannon Artillery Brigade (Vladikavkaz)
- 551st separate communications battalion (Vladikavkaz)
- 395th Separate Radio Relay and Cable Battalion (Vladikavkaz)
- 1919th Separate Electronic Warfare Battalion (Vladikavkaz)
- 1656th separate radio engineering battalion OsNaz (Vladikavkaz)
- 1996th separate air defense radio engineering battalion (Vladikavkaz)
- 508th separate battalion of radiation and chemical reconnaissance (Vladikavkaz)
- separate engineer-sapper battalion (Vladikavkaz)
- separate helicopter squadron (Nalchik)
- 1542nd repair and restoration base (Prokhladny, Kabardino-Balkarian Republic)
- 5853rd property storage base (Prokhladny)
- 876th separate company of the GRU special forces (Vladikavkaz)

=== Post 1989 ===
North Caucasus Military District Map

In 1989, the 14th Tank Division was transferred to the MVD, and retitled as the 100th Motorised Division for Special Use MVD. Later the 100th Division was reduced in status to the 50th Separate Brigade of Operational Designation MVD, now part of the National Guard of Russia.

The official website underlines the importance of the District as a border formation with the task of securing the southern boundary of the Russian Federation. The first conflict the District became involved in during the post Soviet period was the attempted secession of South Ossetia from Georgia to join North Ossetia, which is a federal subject of the Russian Federation. Soldiers from the District became involved in protecting installation in Vladikavkaz from irregular fighters in late 1992.

In 1990, there were three army corps in the district. The 12th Army Corps at Krasnodar, briefly to become the 49th Army, commanded the 9th Motor Rifle Division, the 42nd Army Corps at Vladikavkaz commanded the 19th Motor Rifle Division, and the 34th Army Corps at Volgograd commanded the 82nd Motor Rifle Division. Units directly under district command included the 110th Guards Artillery Division at Buynaksk, the 173rd District Training Centre at Groznyy one SSM, one SAM, one artillery, and one pipeline brigade. There were also reserve (no equipment) units: an artillery brigade, an anti-tank brigade, and a SAM brigade. From late 1991 into 1992 the 173rd Guards District Training Centre suffered huge losses of equipment to Chechen militants as it was pillaged in the process of removal of weapons to the Russian Federation proper; it was formally disbanded on 4 January 1992.

The former 8th Guards Army of Stalingrad fame, was withdrawn from East Germany to the site of its greatest victory, now named Volgograd, in May 1993. While being transferred to the Caucasus, it became 8th Guards Army Corps. Arriving in Volgograd, it absorbed the previous 34th Army Corps, which from May 1992 – June 1993 had been designated the 48th Combined Arms Army.

On December 1, 1993, the 136th Motor Rifle Brigade was established at Buynaksk, Dagestan. In 1996–97, the brigade was merged with the 204th Guards Motor Rifle Regiment "Uman-Berlin" as the 136th Guards Motor Rifle Brigade. The 204th Guards Motor Rifle Regiment was transferred to the North Caucasus at some point during the transformation of the 94th Guards Motor Rifle Division, returning from the GSFG, to become the 74th Guards Motor Rifle Brigade in the Siberian Military District.

The 58th Combined Arms Army's creation was announced on April 26, 1995; previously there had only been corps headquarters in the District. The new 58th Army was formed from the previous 42nd Army Corps headquarters. 8th Guards Army Corps was disbanded in 1998.

In 2006 the District included the 42nd Guards Motor Rifle Division at Khankala, in the environs of Grozny in Chechniya, the 20th "Prikarpatsko-Berlinskaya" Guards Motor Rifle Division (which may have absorbed the 56th Guards Air Assault Brigade), the 33rd Independent Motor Rifle Regiment (Volgograd), the 131st Motor Rifle Brigade (Maykop – former 9 MRD), the 58th Army (headquarters at Vladikavkaz) with the 19th Motor Rifle Division, 136th "Umansko-Berlinskaya" Independent Guards Motor Rifle Brigade, and other brigades and regiments, the 4th Air Army, the Transcaucasus Group of Forces, the Caspian Flotilla, and other formations and units. These other formations and units included the newly forming 33rd and 34th Independent Motor Rifle Brigades (Mountain).

The District was the primary Russian military formation responsible for managing the Chechen conflict throughout the First and Second Chechen Wars. Insurgent activity slowly decreased in the early 2000s. Twenty-six soldiers won the star of the Hero of the Russian Federation in the first war, and 43 in the second.

In the first decade of the 21st century, the Armed Forces did not have the primary role in directing the anti-terrorist effort in the North Caucasus region. The Regional Operational Headquarters (ROSh), chaired by the Deputy Director FSB RF (Head of the department for protection of the constitutional structure and the campaign against terrorism) directed and conducted the counter-terrorist operation. Subordinated to it was the Combined Grouping of Troops (OGV) in the North Caucasus drawing on the Armed Forces, the Interior Troops, the FSB, and other agencies.

During the 2008 South Ossetia War, troops from this district were involved in combat operations in South Ossetia and inside Georgian territory.

The Southern Military District was formed on October 22, 2010, and the North Caucasus Military District was disbanded. Lieutenant General Alexander Galkin took command of the Southern Military District.

== Commanders (1918–2010) ==
- 1918–18: Andrei Snesarev
- 1918–18: A. N. Kovalevsky
- 1918–18: Kliment Voroshilov
- 1920: Georgy Bazilevich
- 1921–24: Kliment Voroshilov
- 1924–25: Nikolay Muralov
- 1925–27: Ieronim Uborevich
- 1927–31: Ivan Panfilovich Belov
- 1931–37: Nikolai Kashirin
- 1937–38: Sergei Efimovich Gribov
- 1938–40: Vladimir Kachalov
- 1940: Mikhail Grigoryevich Yefremov
- 1940–41: Fyodor Kuznetsov
- 1941–42: Vsevolod Sergeyev
- 4 February 1946 – 19 April 1948: General-Lieutenant P.A. Belov
- 20 April 1948 – 16 May 1949: Colonel General Vladimir Romanovsky
- 17 May 1949 – 19 April 1953: Colonel General Sergei Trofimenko
- April 1953 – November 1953: General Colonel Nikolay Pukhov
- 1953–58: Marshal of the Soviet Union Andrei Ivanovich Yeremenko (Nov 53 – Apr 58)
- 1958–68: Army General Issa Alexandrovich Pliyev
- 1968–70: Army General Alexander Terentyevich Altunin
- 1970–76: Colonel General Dmitry Litovtsev
- 1976 – August 1979: Colonel General of Tanks Valery Belikov
- August 1979 – 1980: Colonel General Stanislav Postnikov
- 1980 – August 1984: Colonel General Vladimir Meretskov
- August 1984 – July 1986: Colonel General Viktor Skokov
- July 1986 – June 1993: Colonel General Lev Shustko
- June 1993 – December 1994: Colonel General Alexey Mityukhin
- February 1995 – May 1997: Colonel General Anatoly Kvashnin
- July 1997 – May 2000: Army General Viktor Kazantsev
- May 2000 – December 2002 Colonel General Gennady Troshev
- December 2002 – July 2004: Army General Vladimir Boldyrev
- July 2004 – May 2008: Army General Aleksandr Baranov
- May 2008 – January 2010: Colonel General Sergey Makarov
- January – September 2010: Lieutenant General Alexander Galkin

=== Commanders of the Don Military District ===
- July 1945 – February 1946: Colonel General Pavel Belov
- June 1949 – December 1951: Colonel General Vladimir Romanovsky
- December 1951 – November 1953: Colonel General Nikanor Zakhvatayev

=== Commander of the Kuban Military District ===
- 1945–46: Colonel General Pavel Kurochkin

=== Commanders of the troops of the Stavropol Military District ===
- July 1945 – February 1946: Lieutenant General Ivan Korovnikov
- March – May 1946: Lieutenant General Vsevolod Yakovlev (interim)

== Units and formations ==
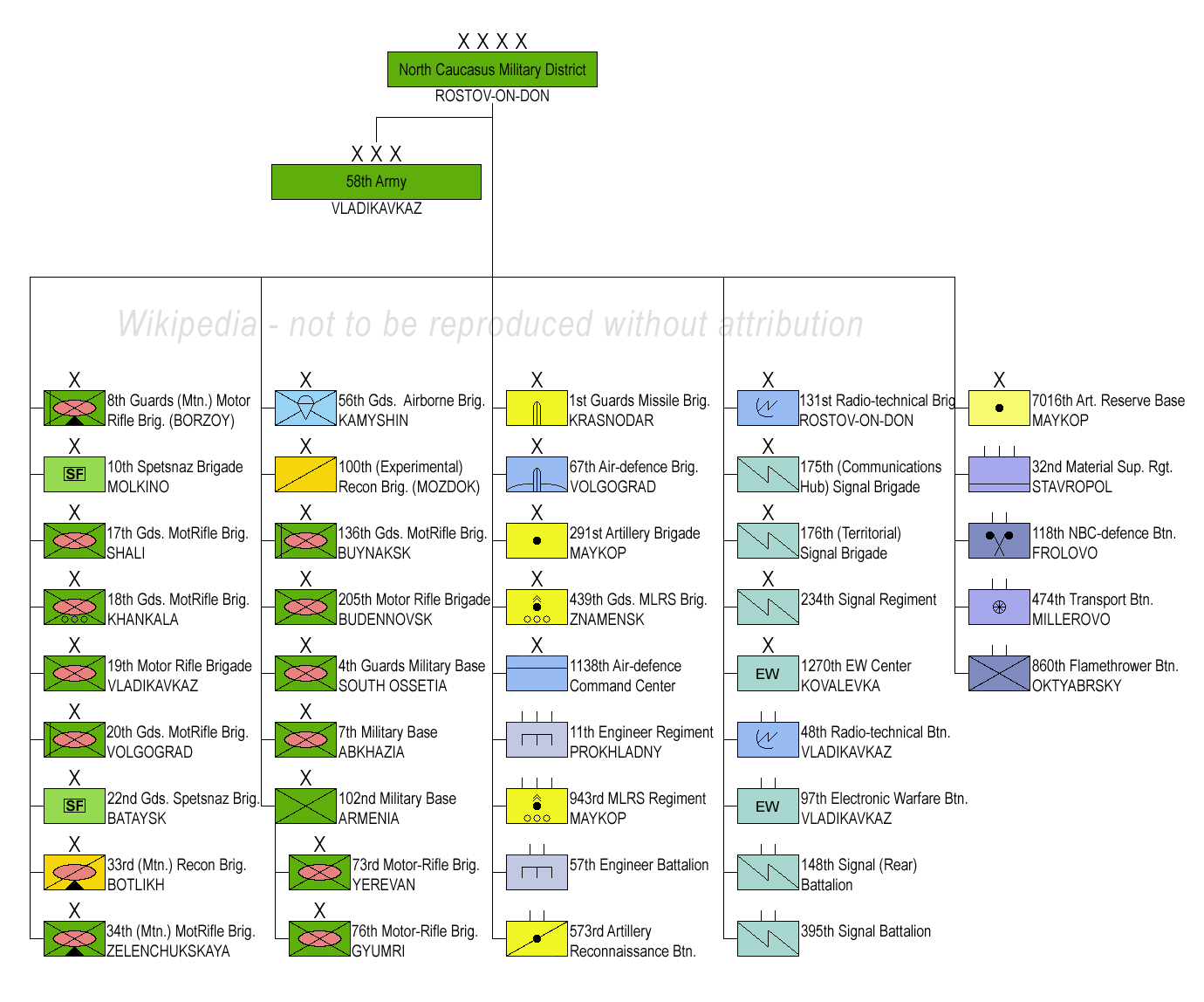
Structure, and units of the North Caucasus Military District 2010

Order of the Red Banner North Caucasus Military District 2010:

- Combat formations:
  - 8th Guards Independent (Mountain) Motor-Rifle Brigade "Shavlinskayy", in Borzoy equipped with BMP
  - 10th Independent Spetsnaz Brigade, in Molkino
  - 17th Guards Independent Motor-Rifle Brigade, in Shali equipped with MT-LBV
  - 18th Guards Independent Motor-Rifle Brigade, in Khankala and Kalininskaya equipped with BTR
  - 19th Independent Motor-Rifle Brigade "Voronezh-Shumlinskaya", in Vladikavkaz
  - 20th Guards Independent Motor-Rifle Brigade "Carpathian-Berlin", in Volgograd equipped with BMP
  - 22nd Spetsnaz Brigade, in Bataysk
  - 33rd Independent (Mountain) Reconnaissance Brigade, in Botlikh equipped with MT-LBV
  - 34th Independent (Mountain) Motor-Rifle Brigade, in Zelenchukskaya equipped with MT-LBV
  - 56th Guards Independent Airborne Brigade, in Kamyshin
  - 100th Independent (Experimental) Reconnaissance Brigade, recently formed in Mozdok
  - 136th Guards Independent Motor-Rifle Brigade "Uman-Berlin", in Buynaksk equipped with BMP
  - 205th Independent Motor-Rifle Brigade, in Budyonnovsk equipped with MT-LBV
  - 4th Guards Military Base "Vapnyarsko-Berlin", in South Ossetia
  - 7th Military Base "Krasnodar", in Abkhazia
  - 102nd Red Banner Military Base, headquarters at Gyumri, Armenia
    - 73rd Independent Motor-Rifle Brigade, in Yerevan
    - 76th Independent Motor-Rifle Brigade, in Gyumri
- Missile and Artillery formations:
  - 1st Guards Rocket Brigade "Orsha", in Krasnodar Total: 12 9K720 Iskander.
  - 291st Artillery Brigade, in Maykop
  - 439th Guards MLRS Brigade "Perekop", in Znamensk
  - 943rd Multiple Rocket Launcher Regiment, in Maykop
  - 7016th Artillery Reserve Base, in Maykop
  - 573rd Independent Artillery Reconnaissance Battalion
- Air defense formations:
  - 67th Air-defence Missile Brigade, in Volgograd, equipped with the Buk missile system
  - 1138th Air-defence Command Center
- Radar formations:
  - 131st Independent Radio-technical Brigade, in Rostov-on-Don
  - 48th Independent Radio-Technical Battalion, in Vladikavkaz
- Engineering formations:
  - 11th Engineer Regiment, in Prokhladny
  - 57th Independent Engineer Battalion
- NBC-defence formations:
  - 118th Independent NBC-defence Battalion, in Frolovo
  - 860th Independent Flamethrower Battalion, in Oktyabrsky
- Signal formations:
  - 175th (Communications Hub) Signal Brigade "Luninetsko-Lipskaya"
  - 176th (Territorial) Signal Brigade
  - 234th Independent Signal Regiment
  - 148th Independent (Rear) Signal Battalion
  - 395th Independent Signal Battalion
  - 97th Independent Electronic Warfare Battalion, in Vladikavkaz
  - 1270th Independent Electronic Warfare Center, in Kovalevka
- Other formations:
  - 32nd Material Support Regiment, in Stavropol
  - 474th Transport Battalion, in Millerovo

Also located at Novorossiysk within the district's boundaries, but not under its command, was the 7th Guards Mountain Air Assault Division, part of the Russian Airborne Troops with their headquarters in Moscow.

=== Band ===
The Headquarters Military Band of the North Caucasus Military District was founded on 26 December 1962. Musicians have been repeated laureates and diploma recipients of all-army competitions of military bands, as well as a laureate of an international festival in Yugoslavia. It has also visited the Chechen Republic more than once, and in February 2002 attended a military parade of the United Group of Forces in Grozny. The unit consisted of 83 musician who were both military and civilian personnel.

=== Song and Dance Ensemble ===
The Song and Dance Ensemble of the North Caucasian Military District was created in 1943 and has a permanent composition of 50 musicians. Every fifth member of the collective is an honored artist of some profession. There is also a composition of 5–10 conscripts. Its main task is to help the commanders of units maintain the moral and psychological spirit of their personnel. In the period between 1999 and 2003, the ensemble performed 200 concerts in the area of the counter-terrorist operation in the North Caucasus.

=== Museum ===
On 1 November 1967, a museum dedicated to the military history of the North Caucasian Military District was opened in the House of Officers of the district. Since October 2010, it has served as the military history museum of the Southern Military District. In the memorial hall of the new museum, there is a relief map of the former district, opposite to which there are marble pylons with the names of two and three time Heroes of the Soviet Union. The Civil War hall reflects on the history of the creation and formation of the North Caucasian Military District.

== Bibliography ==
- Blandy, C.W. (2007-11-01). Advent of Mountain Brigades. Conflict Studies Research Centre.
- Dvoinykh, L.V.; Kariaeva, T.F.; Stegantsev, M.V., eds. (1991). Центральный государственный архив Советской армии [Central State Archive of the Soviet Army] (in Russian). Vol. 1. Minneapolis: Eastview Publications. ISBN 1-879944-02-2. Archived from the original on 2016-11-12.
- Feskov, V.I.; K.A. Kalashnikov; V.I. Golikov (2004). The Soviet Army in the Years of the 'Cold War' (1945–1991). Tomsk: Tomsk University Press. ISBN 5-7511-1819-7.
- V.I. Feskov, Golikov V.I., K.A. Kalashnikov, and S.A. Slugin (2013). Вооруженные силы СССР после Второй Мировой войны: от Красной Армии к Советской (часть 1: Сухопутные войска) [The Armed Forces of the USSR after World War II, from the Red Army to the Soviet (Part 1: Land Forces)]. Tomsk. Improved version of 2004 work with many inaccuracies corrected.
- John Mackinlay; Peter Cross, eds. (2003). Regional Peacekeepers: The Paradox of Russian Peacekeeping. Tokyo/New York/Paris: United Nations University Press. ISBN 9789280810790. - regarding Georgia and South Ossetia
- Sazonov, Major General (1 November 1946). "Выписка из исторического формуляра 60 ск" [Extract from the Historical Form of the 60th Rifle Corps]. Pamyat Naroda (in Russian). Central Archives of the Russian Ministry of Defence. – Located in fond 949, opus 1, file 2 of the Central Archives of the Russian Ministry of Defence
- Scott, Harriet and William F. Russian Military Directory, 2002
- Scott; Harriet and William F. (1979). The Armed Forces of the USSR. Boulder: Westview Press. ISBN 978-0-89158-276-2.
