= Matvey Shaposhnikov =

Soviet military commander

- Born: 29 November 1906; Alexeyevka, Voronezh Governorate, Russian Empire
- Died: 28 June 1994 (aged 87); Rostov-on-Don, Russia

Matvey Kuzmich Shaposhnikov (Russian: Матвей Кузьмич Шапошников; November 29, 1906, settlement Alexeyevka, Voronezh Province — June 25, 1994, Rostov-on-Don) was a Soviet military commander, Lieutenant General and Hero of the Soviet Union. In World War II, he served in the Battle of Brody among other fronts. During the Novocherkassk massacre in 1962, as the first deputy commander of the North Caucasian Military District, he refused to comply with the order to attack the demonstrators with tanks.

Shaposhnikov later tried to publicize information about the Novocherkassk massacre by sending six letters to the Soviet Komsomol committee and a number of higher education institutions.

In 1966 Shaposhnikov transferred to the reserve. In January 1967 he was expelled from the Communist Party. On August 26, 1967, the Rostov region KGB opened a criminal case of Anti-Sovietism (article 70 of the Criminal Code of the RSFSR) against Shaposhnikov. This is when the letters and drafts of an appeal on the Novocherkassk massacre were revealed. On December 23, 1967, the criminal case was dismissed because of Shaposhnikov's rank and his apology.

Personally, I am unable to conceal resentment or anger at those who committed these arbitrary and outrageous actions. I only regret not having been able to really fight this evil. In the fight against despotism and tyranny I did not have the ability to conduct a battle to the death. In the struggle with the evil that remains widespread and entrenched in the army, the tyranny of high-handedness, meanness, and hypocrisy, I did not have enough effective weapons, except the illusory belief that the truth, in and of itself, would win, and that justice would prevail.

Shaposhnikov was reinstated in the Communist Party December 6, 1988.

He lived in Rostov-on-Don.

He died June 28, 1994, and was buried in the North Cemetery in Rostov-on-Don.
