= Novocherkassk massacre =

1962 mass killing in the Soviet Union

- Новочеркасский расстрел, Novocherkasskiy rasstrel
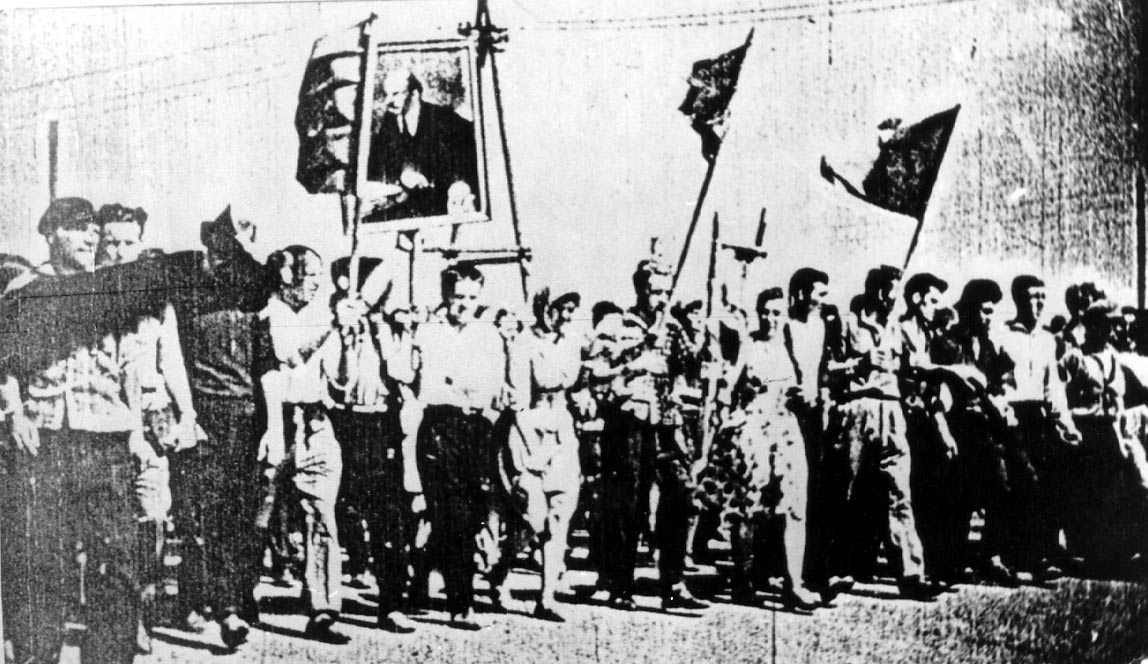
- Demonstrators marching before the massacre, carrying red banners and a portrait of Vladimir Lenin
- Date: 2 June 1962
- Location: Novocherkassk, Rostov Oblast, Russian SFSR, Soviet Union; 47.4096°N 40.1013°E
- Caused by: Economic conditions, including food price increases and wage cuts
- Result: Protests suppressed: Approximately 23–26 killed, many dozens wounded; 107 imprisoned and 7 executed; Official cover-up initiated

Parties
Striking workers and protesters	Soviet Union: Soviet Army; MVD; KGB

Lead figures
Spontaneous leadership	Nikita Khrushchev; Frol Kozlov; Anastas Mikoyan; Issa Pliyev; Matvei Shaposhnikov

Number
~5,000–12,000 demonstrators	~3,000 Army troops; ~300 MVD troops; Tanks and armored personnel carriers; 140+ KGB agents; Local police, druzhinniki

Casualties and losses
24 killed; 69 severely wounded; Many minorly injured	86 soldiers injured (mostly minor, 9 hospitalized)

The Novocherkassk massacre (Russian: Новочеркасский расстрел, romanized: Novocherkasskiy rasstrel) took place on 2 June 1962 in Novocherkassk, Russian SFSR, Soviet Union, when Soviet Army soldiers and MVD Internal Troops, supported by KGB units, fired on unarmed demonstrators protesting economic conditions. The massacre took place during a strike that began the previous day at the Novocherkassk Electric Locomotive Works (NEVZ) after the government under Nikita Khrushchev announced nationwide price increases for meat and butter, which coincided with pay cuts at the factory.

The strike spread rapidly after initial attempts by authorities to suppress it failed and police arrested several workers. On 2 June, thousands of protesters marched from the factory district to the Communist Party headquarters (gorkom) in the city center, overwhelming military barricades. After the demonstrators occupied the gorkom and demanded to speak with officials, troops opened fire on the crowd. Concurrent clashes at the police station resulted in more deaths. Official records later confirm anywhere from 23–24 deaths, but other sources say 26 demonstrators were killed and 87 severely wounded.

Soviet authorities immediately began an extensive cover-up, secretly burying the victims in unmarked graves outside the city and compelling witnesses and participants to sign non-disclosure pledges. Over 100 people were later convicted in show trials for "mass disorders" and "banditry", with seven sentenced to death and executed. Information about the event was suppressed until glasnost in the late 1980s. Following investigations initiated amid the dissolution of the Soviet Union, most of those convicted were rehabilitated in the 1990s. The massacre is remembered as a key event exposing the limitations of the Khrushchev Thaw, and significantly impacted subsequent Soviet economic and internal security policies.

== Background ==
=== Economic conditions and Khrushchev's policies ===
In the spring of 1962, the Soviet Union faced economic difficulties. Responding to agricultural shortfalls and the need to fund infrastructure investment, the government under Nikita Khrushchev announced nationwide price increases for essential goods. On 31 May 1962, the state declared that the retail prices for meat and meat products would rise by 30 percent and butter by 25 percent, effective 1 June. This decision was presented as temporary, necessary to boost agricultural production, and made with the confidence that the Soviet people would understand.

However, this measure followed several years of Khrushchev's often erratic and ultimately unsuccessful agricultural policies. Initiatives like the Virgin Lands campaign and the push for maize cultivation had yielded mixed results, while restrictions on private plots and livestock ownership had negatively impacted food supplies, particularly meat and dairy. By 1962, the USSR lagged significantly behind its agricultural production targets and Khrushchev's earlier promises to surpass the United States in per capita output of meat, milk, and butter. The price hikes were seen by many workers as a direct consequence of government mismanagement and a betrayal of the implicit social contract of the post-Stalin era, where the regime guaranteed basic necessities and slowly improving living standards in exchange for political acquiescence.

=== Local conditions in Novocherkassk ===
Novocherkassk within the European Soviet Union

Novocherkassk, historically the capital of the Don Cossacks, had become a significant industrial city in the Soviet era, with a population of 130,000 in 1962. Its largest enterprise was the Novocherkassk Electric Locomotive Works (NEVZ), employing around 13,000 workers. The city also hosted several other factories and was a major educational center, with over 30,000 students in higher education and technical schools.

Working and living conditions for NEVZ employees were poor. Safety conditions were inadequate, highlighted by a recent incident where 200 workers in one department suffered poisoning. Dining facilities were insufficient, serving meager food, and many workers could not get hot meals, especially those on night shifts. Housing was in short supply, with many workers living in temporary barracks or tents. Wages were inconsistently applied and not always related to skill or difficulty of work. Compounding these issues, the NEVZ management, under the recently appointed director Boris Kurochkin, had begun implementing upward revisions of work norms throughout 1962 as part of a nationwide wage reform. This effectively amounted to a pay cut of up to 30 percent for many workers. The simultaneous implementation of these pay cuts and the announcement of nationwide food price increases created what one commentator later called a "fateful coincidence" that directly triggered the strike.

== Events ==
=== Strike begins (1 June) ===
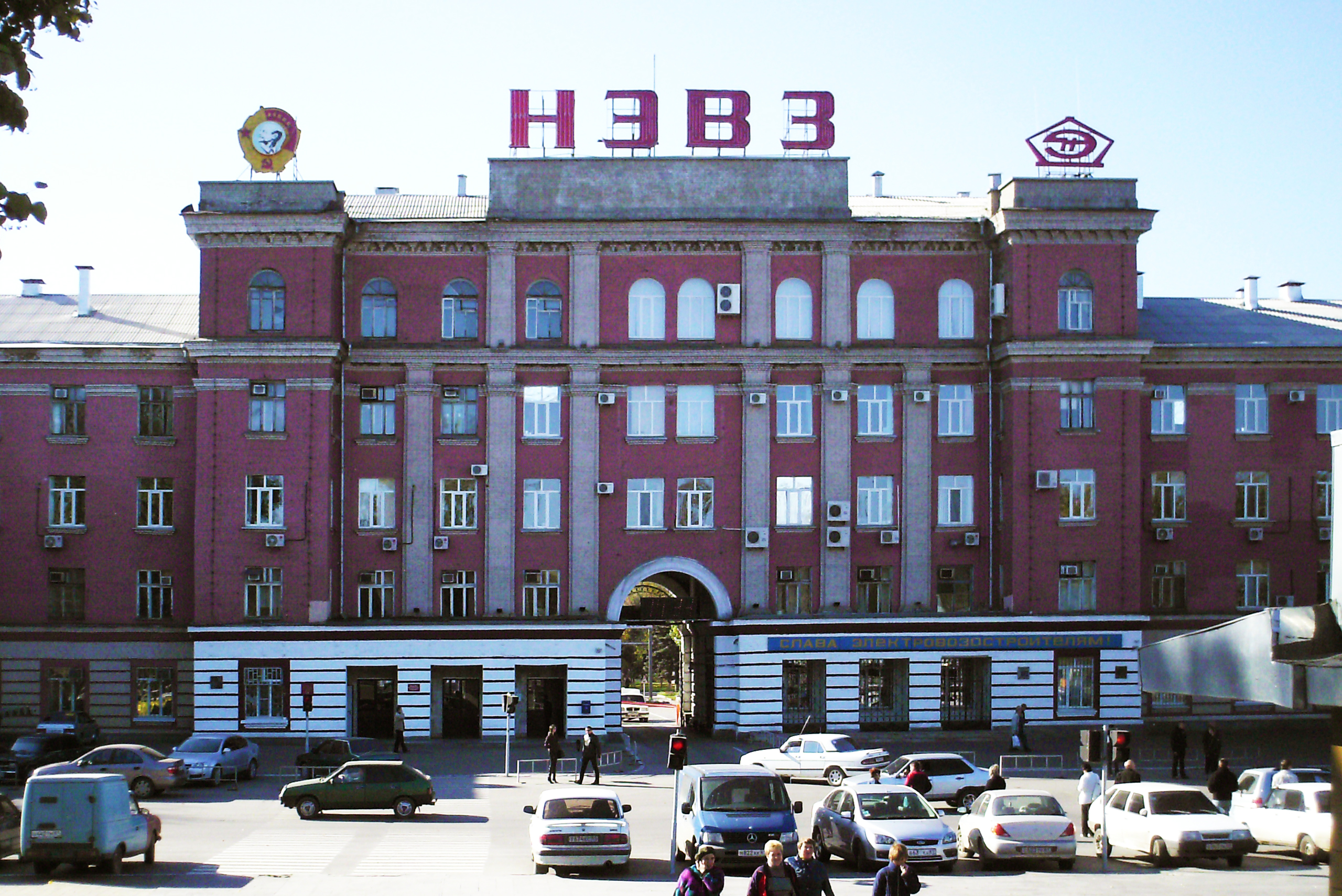
The Novocherkassk Electric Locomotive Plant (NEVZ) in 2007

The strike began spontaneously on the morning of 1 June 1962, at the steel foundry division of the NEVZ plant. Workers gathered to discuss the food price increases announced the previous day, which they viewed as an intolerable burden on their already strained finances. When party officials attempted to justify the new policy, they were met with hostility. The foundry head, Chernyshkov, ordered the workers back to their posts, but they instead moved to the square outside the factory administration building.

Plant director Boris Kurochkin arrived to confront the growing crowd, estimated at several hundred workers. Instead of dispersing, workers from other divisions joined the protest, complaining about poor conditions and low wages. Kurochkin remained intransigent. When a female worker asked how they could afford meat with the price increases, he reportedly replied flippantly, "If there isn't enough money for meat and sausage, let them eat pirozhki [pasties] with liver." This remark enraged the crowd, unleashing insults and shouts of "The scoundrels are mocking us." Around mid-morning, the strike began in earnest.

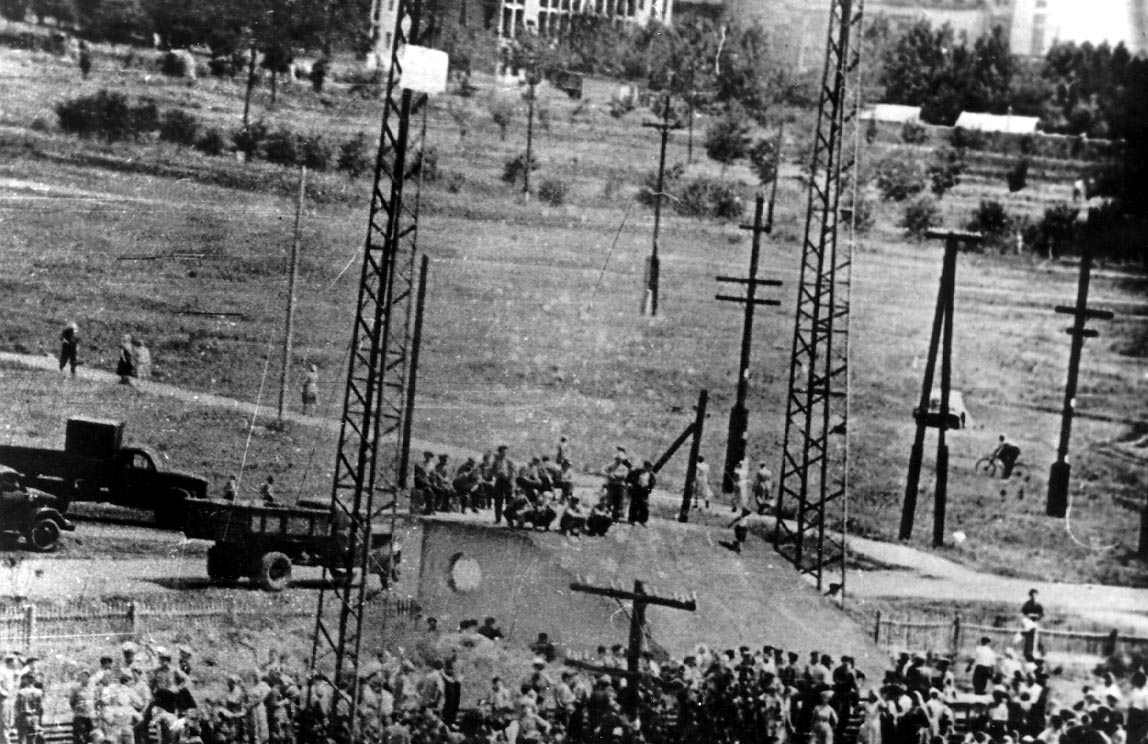
Strikers gathered at the plant on 1 June. A placard with the slogan "Meat, butter, a pay raise!" is attached atop a power line.

Two workers activated the factory siren, its continuous blast drawing thousands more workers from NEVZ and residents from nearby settlements. Strikers went through NEVZ divisions and to other nearby factories, urging workers to join. By noon, the crowd outside the NEVZ administration building had grown to 6,000–7,000 people. Shortly after noon, protesters stopped a passenger train on the adjacent Saratov–Rostov railway line by placing barricades on the tracks. They inscribed slogans like "Meat, butter, a pay raise" and "Make sausage out of Khrushchev" on the locomotive and carriages. The train's whistle was set blowing continuously, adding to the noise. This blockade, which lasted over fourteen hours, was intended to publicize the strike and pressure authorities.

Local and provincial authorities were alerted early on. The head of the city party organization and KGB officials established a command post in the director's office at NEVZ. Around 12:30 PM, Aleksandr Basov, the First Secretary of the Rostov Province party organization, ordered the military commander of the North Caucasus Military District, General Issa Pliyev, to deploy troops. Basov himself arrived later in the afternoon. Around 4:30 PM, Basov and other officials attempted to address the crowd from a balcony of the administration building using a loudspeaker. When Basov offered no concessions, the crowd responded by throwing stones, bottles, and metal objects, forcing the officials to retreat inside and barricade themselves. Basov effectively became a hostage, remaining trapped until late that night.

Between 6:00 and 7:00 PM, 200 uniformed policemen attempted to disperse the crowd but were quickly overwhelmed and forced to retreat. Two hours later, five vehicles with soldiers and three armored troop carriers arrived but were also stopped by the crowd. Some strikers urged the soldiers, many of whom appeared hesitant, to join their protest, echoing tactics from the February Revolution of 1917. According to Petr Siuda, a participant later convicted, soldiers and strikers fraternized, and the officers struggled to withdraw their men. The authorities had lost control of the NEVZ district.

A mass meeting continued in the square late into the night. Speakers used the top of a railway underpass entrance as a platform. Portraits of Khrushchev were burned. Various tactics were proposed. A radical suggestion to seize the post and telegraph offices was rejected. Instead, the crowd agreed to march into the city center the next morning to present their demands directly to the authorities at the gorkom (party headquarters). Word had apparently spread that high-level officials from Moscow had arrived. During the night, 22 people identified as key activists were arrested, though 20 were quickly released "to avoid unnecessary complications". Simultaneously, substantial military forces, including Army and MVD troops (around 3,300 soldiers initially) and tank units, were concentrated in and around Novocherkassk under the command of General Matvei Shaposhnikov, Pliyev's deputy. Key buildings like the gorkom, police station/KGB office, state bank, and post office were secured. A curfew was imposed.

=== March and massacre (2 June) ===
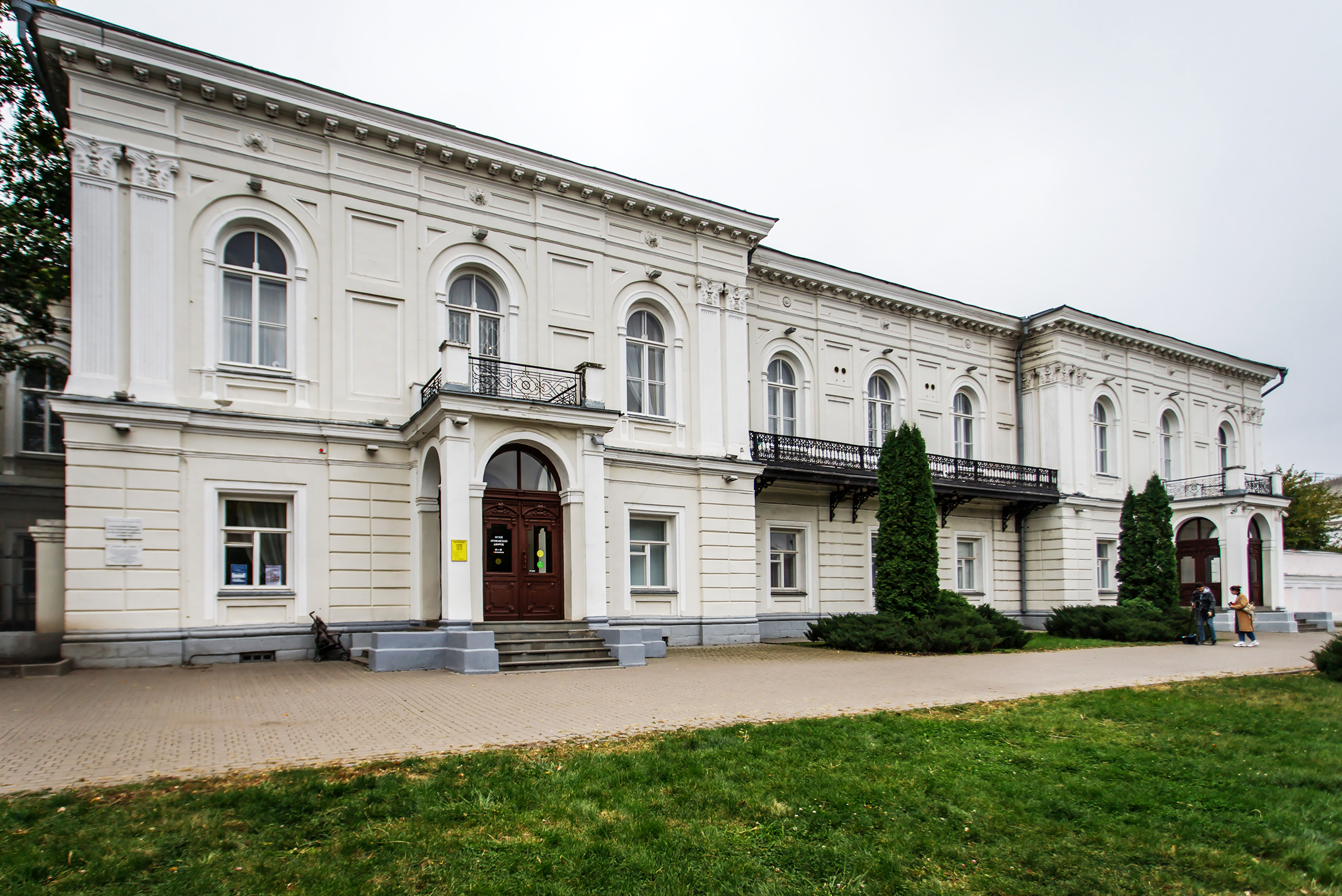
Novocherkassk gorkom building (formerly the Ataman Palace), the site of the massacre, in 2019

On the morning of 2 June, workers arriving for the first shift found the NEVZ plant occupied by the military. Enraged, they refused to work at gunpoint and poured out into the square, swelling the numbers for the planned march. Some strikers again stopped a passenger train briefly, but General Shaposhnikov, commanding the troops at NEVZ, chose not to intervene immediately.

Thousands of demonstrators, estimated between 5,000 and 12,000, formed a column and began the nine-kilometer (5.6 mi) march from the industrial district to the city center around 10:30 AM. Many carried red banners and portraits of Vladimir Lenin, symbolically asserting their loyalty to revolutionary ideals while protesting current policies. Some carried placards with slogans like "Meat, butter, a pay raise" or identifying their factory divisions. Wives and children were included in the procession to emphasize its peaceful intentions. The march was generally orderly and calm.

The authorities planned to block the procession at the bridge over the Tuzlov River, the only crossing point connecting the industrial zone to the main city. Fifteen tanks and armored cars under Colonel Mikheev were deployed on the bridge, along with cadets from a military school. Despite the heavy military presence, the tanks offered no resistance and remained stationary. The demonstrators bypassed the armor by scrambling down the river banks and wading through the shallow water, or jostling past the cadets and vehicles on the bridge itself. A second line of defense using fire engines positioned south of the bridge also failed to act.

Having overcome these obstacles, the marchers became more confident, singing revolutionary songs like "The Internationale." Meanwhile, the high-level delegation from Moscow—including Presidium members Frol Kozlov, Anastas Mikoyan, Andrei Kirilenko, and Dmitry Polyansky, along with Central Committee secretaries Alexander Shelepin and Leonid Ilyichev—had gathered at the gorkom building in the city center, which was heavily guarded by MVD troops and tanks. Mikoyan reportedly wished to speak to the demonstrators but was dissuaded for security reasons. As the massive, generally peaceful procession approached the square (formerly Ataman Square, renamed Lenin Square), the entire leadership group, likely led by the hardliner Kozlov, fled the gorkom through a back door to the safety of a nearby military compound.

The demonstrators filled the square by around 10:30 AM. Finding the leaders unwilling to meet them, frustration grew, and more aggressive elements took control. Protesters broke through the lines of MVD troops and druzhinniki guarding the gorkom and occupied the building. Inside, they caused some vandalism, breaking furniture and tearing down portraits of Khrushchev. Some protesters appeared on the second-floor balcony, unfurling a red banner and a portrait of Lenin, and addressed the crowd below. Speeches complained about conditions and the price hikes. One particularly agitated speaker was E. P. Levchenko, one of the workers arrested and released the previous night. She claimed that prisoners were being held and beaten at the nearby police station (which also housed the local KGB office) and urged the crowd to free them.

A group of about fifty people, led by Levchenko, rushed the half-kilometer (0.31 mi) to the police station. Despite an officer's assurances that no prisoners were inside (the two remaining detainees had been moved out of town overnight), the crowd tore down the outer door and used it as a battering ram on an inner door. Soldiers inside fired a warning volley over the heads of the intruders. In the ensuing chaos and close-contact struggle, one soldier, Sh. Iu. Azizov, shot and killed a worker who had attempted to seize another soldier's rifle. As protesters tried to flee, soldiers stationed in an inner courtyard opened fire, killing or wounding several more. Five protesters died in the melee at the police station; two wounded sixteen-year-old onlookers died later. Thirty protesters who had sought refuge in a room were arrested.

Back at the gorkom square, military units began clearing the building around noon. General Oleshko, chosen by Pliyev to manage the situation, appeared on the gorkom balcony with other officers. Using a microphone, he ordered the crowd, now numbering in the thousands and including many onlookers and teenagers, to disperse immediately. The crowd responded with whistles and defiant shouts, some demanding to hear Mikoyan. Oleshko repeated his demand and warned he would count to three, after which soldiers would fire. Fifty soldiers deployed in two semicircular ranks in front of the building knelt in firing position. Believing the soldiers wouldn't shoot ("They won't shoot at the people"), the crowd did not move.

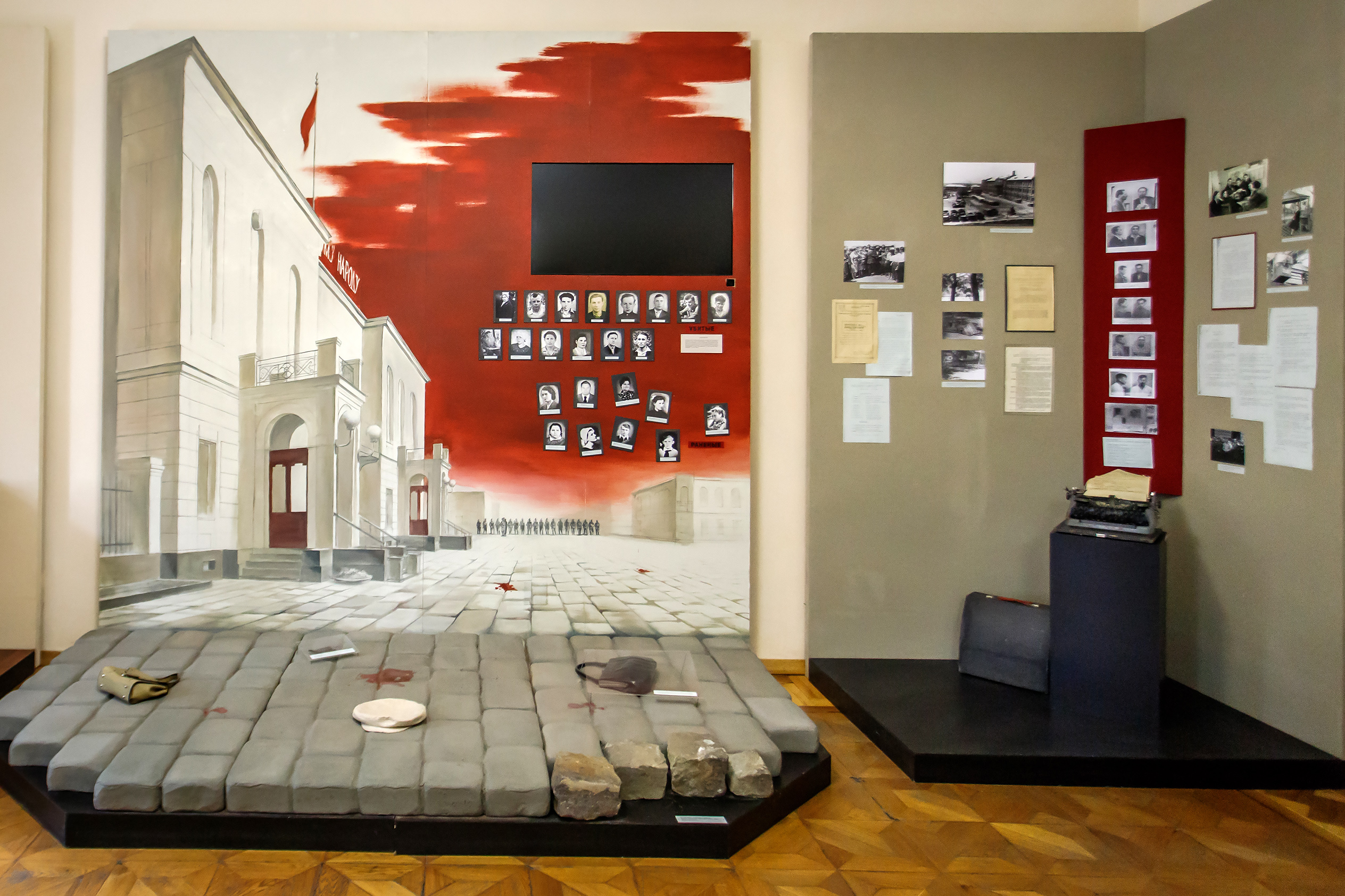
Exhibit at the Novocherkassk Memorial Museum

At around 12:30 PM, Oleshko gave the order "Fire!". The soldiers fired a warning volley over the heads of the crowd. Some protesters initially thought they were firing blanks, but almost immediately, sustained gunfire erupted, lasting one to four minutes. People screamed and scattered in panic, but the dense crowd made escape difficult. The firing targeted not only the square but also the retreating crowd in the adjacent public garden and streets. Sixteen people were killed in the square and garden; many more were wounded, some hit hundreds of meters away. There were conflicting accounts about the source of the deadly fire. While some witnesses maintained soldiers in the square fired directly into the crowd after the warning volley, the official investigation later concluded, based on considerable testimony (including from soldiers on the ground), that the killing shots came from machine guns or rifles fired from the roofs or upper windows of the gorkom and adjacent buildings (Komsomol HQ, city procuracy) by specially positioned units, possibly KGB or military intelligence snipers. This alternative scenario suggests a premeditated operation designed to suppress the protest decisively while maintaining ambiguity about who gave the final order and who carried it out.

== Aftermath ==
=== Immediate actions ===
Immediately after the shooting stopped, KGB agents and police officers in plain clothes began clearing the square, loading corpses onto trucks. Fire engines were brought in to wash the blood from the cobblestones, though stains remained, leading authorities to pave the square with asphalt a day or two later. The wounded made their way, or were carried by others, to the city hospital, which quickly became overwhelmed. Medical supplies ran short, and patients already admitted were discharged to make room.

A strict curfew was imposed from 9:00 PM to 6:00 AM and enforced by heavy military patrols and checkpoints, effectively sealing the city. Telephone communication with the outside world remained cut off. To prevent a large public funeral that could reignite protests, the bodies of the 24 victims were secretly transported out of the city during the night of 2–3 June. They were buried in unmarked graves, two by two, in several different cemeteries in remote locations, including near Martsevo, Tarasovskii, and Novoshakhtinsk. The nearly 80 personnel involved in the burials were forced to sign non-disclosure pledges, swearing never to reveal what they had done or seen. Families were not informed of the burial locations and were unable to recover the bodies until 1992.

=== Official response and pacification ===
The Moscow leadership quickly initiated measures both repressive and conciliatory. An intensive hunt for protest organizers and active participants began, assisted by party loyalists who identified suspects. By 12 June 146 people had been arrested, though many were later released after questioning. Simultaneously, efforts were made to appease the population. Mikoyan delivered a conciliatory radio address, broadcast repeatedly on 2 and 3 June, acknowledging some worker grievances (regarding the revision of work norms) but defending the price increases and condemning the "disorders." Kozlov also spoke on the radio on 3 June, blaming "hooligans" and "provocateurs" but promising improved food supplies and review of the work norms, while threatening that order would be maintained "by whatever means may be necessary."

Several officials deemed responsible for mishandling the situation were removed. NEVZ director Kurochkin was fired on 4 June and later expelled from the party. His replacement, P. A. Abroskin, who had previously held the post and was reportedly well-liked, quickly implemented improvements in factory working conditions and dining facilities. Provincial party chief Basov and military commanders Pliyev and Oleshko were transferred to new assignments outside the region within months. Increased food supplies were directed to Novocherkassk stores. The curfew was lifted after several days, and most troops were withdrawn, though a climate of fear and intimidation persisted.

== Trials ==
Defendants in principal trial, RSFSR Supreme Court
Defendant	Age	Sentence
V. D. Cherepanov	26	Death
V. I. Chernykh	24	12 years
Iu. P. Dement'ev	27	15 years
G. A. Goncharov	22	10 years
G. G. Katkov	36	11 years
A. A. Korkach	45	Death
M. A. Kuznetsov	28	Death
E. P. Levchenko	27	12 years
B. N. Mokrousov	39	Death
G. M. Shcherban	27	10 years
V. G. Shubaev	25	Death
I. P. Sluzhenko	32	12 years
S. S. Sotnikov	25	Death
A. F. Zaitsev	35	Death

Between August and September 1962, approximately 114 individuals arrested in connection with the strike and demonstration were brought to trial in Novocherkassk and Rostov-on-Don. The most important trial involved fourteen defendants and was held in August 1962 at the military headquarters building in Novocherkassk. Given the "special social significance" attributed to the case, it was tried before a panel of the RSFSR Supreme Court, presided over by L. G. Smirnov. The chief prosecutor was A. A. Kruglov, the Procurator General of the RSFSR.

The trial was declared "open", but attendance was by invitation only, primarily restricted to party members, Komsomol activists, and handpicked workers. Security was extremely tight. No information about the trial appeared in the Soviet press. The fourteen defendants (thirteen men and one woman, E. P. Levchenko) were mostly young workers, aged between 18 and 45. Twelve were Russian and two were Ukrainian.

All were charged under Article 79 of the RSFSR Criminal Code ("Mass Disorders"). Eight of the fourteen were additionally charged under Article 77 ("Banditry"), defined as "the organization of armed bands for the purpose of attacking state or social institutions... or participation in such bands and attacks." This charge was legally baseless, as no armed bands had been formed and no witnesses testified to their existence. Its application appeared politically motivated, likely demanded by the Presidium in Moscow to enable the imposition of the death penalty, which Article 77 allowed, while Article 79 mandated only prison terms of two to fifteen years.

Although initially denying the charges, most defendants reportedly confessed during the preliminary investigation, likely under duress or false promises of mitigation. The prosecution presented the defendants as criminals, hooligans, and drunkards, emphasizing prior convictions for some (five of the fourteen had previous records, mostly for embezzlement). Witnesses against the strikers were overwhelmingly party or Komsomol members, police, and military officers. The courtroom atmosphere was reportedly hostile, with audience members interrupting proceedings with applause for prosecution witnesses and demands for the death penalty.

Ultimately, all fourteen were convicted of mass disorders. The eight charged with banditry were also found guilty of that offense. Seven of the eight charged under Article 77 were sentenced to death by firing squad. E. P. Levchenko received a twelve-year prison sentence. The remaining defendants received sentences ranging from ten to fifteen years in severe-regime labor camps. The seven death sentences were carried out. Many of the prison sentences were later commuted.

== Cover-up and remembrance ==
=== Secrecy and silence (1962–1988) ===
The Novocherkassk massacre was subject to an immediate and comprehensive official cover-up that lasted for decades. Beyond the secret burials and restricted trials, authorities actively suppressed any mention of the events. KGB agents monitored correspondence and public spaces, restricted travel to and from the region, and warned released prisoners against discussing their experiences. The Soviet press remained entirely silent on the strike and massacre. Within Novocherkassk, a climate of fear effectively silenced the local population; many destroyed photographs or purged memories related to the victims.

Despite the official secrecy, information gradually seeped out. Foreign news outlets published fragmented and sometimes inaccurate reports as early as July–August 1962, based on rumors picked up by correspondents or diplomats. Radio Liberty broadcast a relatively detailed account into the Soviet Union in September 1962. The most significant early account appeared in Aleksandr Solzhenitsyn's The Gulag Archipelago (published abroad in 1973), which provided a vivid narrative based on eyewitness testimonies, though it also contained inaccuracies and perpetuated some rumors (such as the use of dum-dum bullets or the exile of victims' families). Soviet dissidents, including Petr Grigorenko, Andrei Sakharov, and Yelena Bonner, learned of the massacre and attempted to publicize it through samizdat leaflets in the 1970s, explicitly linking it to the legacy of Soviet repression.

=== Glasnost and rehabilitation (1988–1996) ===
The advent of glasnost under Mikhail Gorbachev created the conditions for the public uncovering of the Novocherkassk events. The key figure in breaking the silence was Petr Siuda, a former NEVZ worker arrested on 1 June and imprisoned for several years. Beginning in late 1987, Siuda launched a persistent campaign, writing letters to authorities, circulating his memoirs in samizdat, speaking publicly, and distributing leaflets demanding reconsideration of the events and rehabilitation of the victims.

Siuda's efforts, coupled with the changing political climate, pressured local party officials. In June 1988, the Rostov Komsomol newspaper Komsomolets published the first officially sanctioned article on the massacre, written by journalist Olga Nikitina. Though reflecting some official viewpoints, the article confirmed that workers had been shot and provoked significant public reaction. In June 1989, the national newspaper Komsomolskaya Pravda published a more critical exposé by Iurii Bespalov and Valerii Konovalov, bringing the story to a massive audience. This article prompted deputies at the newly convened Congress of People's Deputies of the Soviet Union, led by Anatoly Sobchak, to demand a full investigation and rehabilitation.

Responding to mounting pressure, the Chief Military Procuracy of the USSR launched a new investigation in late 1989, which concluded in mid-1991. Simultaneously, the Novocherkassk Tragedy Foundation was established in 1989 by local activists, including Siuda, Nikitina, Irina Mardar', and Valentina Vodianitskaia, to gather testimony, locate burial sites, support victims' families, and press for official accountability.

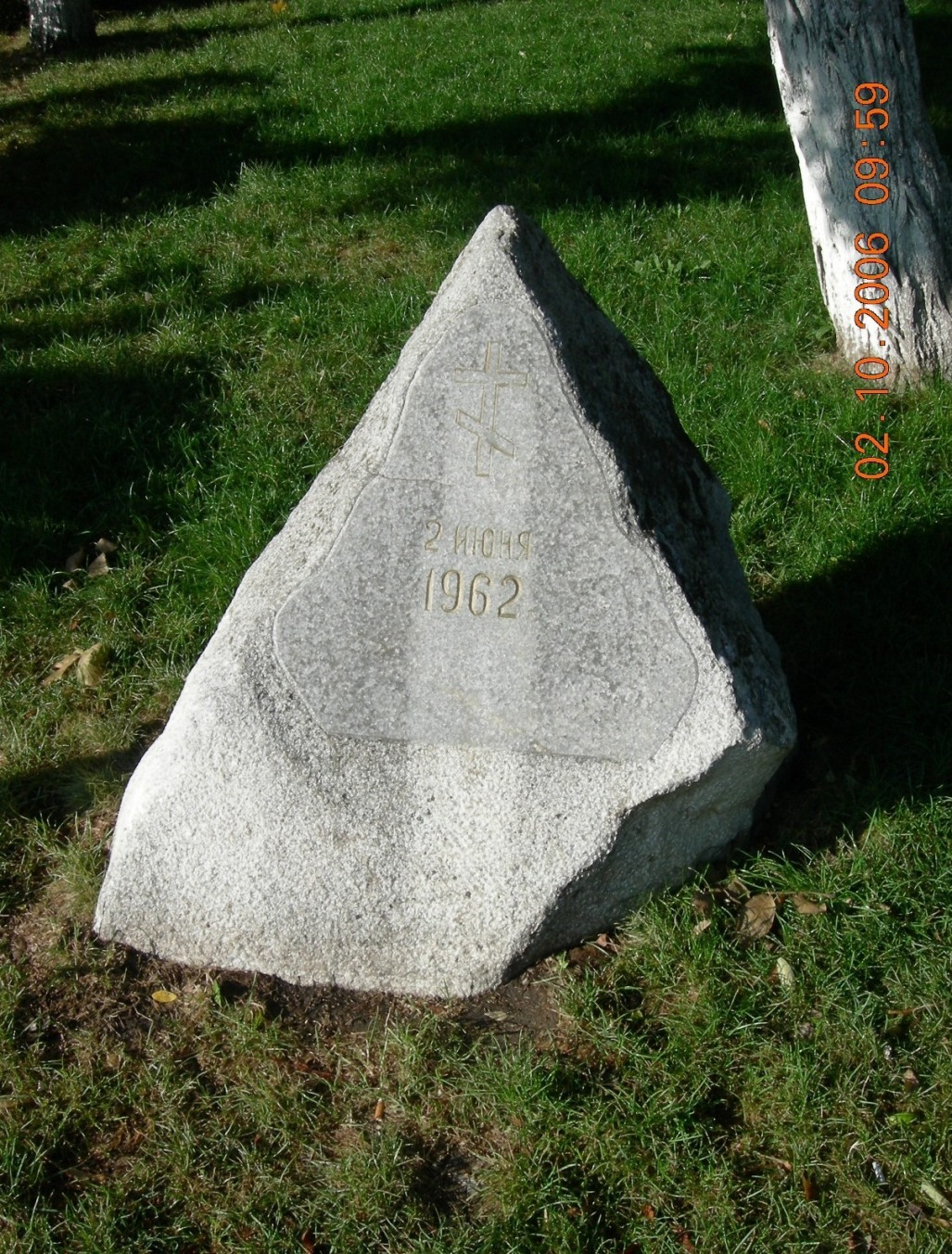
Memorial stone to victims of the massacre, with the text "2 June 1962"

Key breakthroughs occurred amid the dissolution of the Soviet Union. In January 1991, authorities declassified the locations of the secret burial sites. On 27 March 1991, the Plenum of the RSFSR Supreme Court officially reviewed the 1962 verdicts, exonerating the seven executed men on the charge of banditry due to "absence of criminality in their actions" and repealing the verdicts against nineteen others convicted of mass disorders. On 2 June 1992, the 30th anniversary, the remains of the victims, recovered by the Tragedy Foundation, were solemnly reburied in Novocherkassk after a day of public mourning. A memorial stone was erected in the main square, and a plaque was placed at the NEVZ factory entrance.

In 1993, crucial KGB documents detailing the events and aftermath were declassified and published in the journal Istoricheskii arkhiv. The Chief Military Procuracy's investigation, led by Colonel Iurii Bagraev, concluded in 1994, finding that the decision to use arms was made by the Presidium members present in Novocherkassk with Khrushchev's approval, and that the shooting was a "cold-bloodedly prepared and cold-bloodedly executed" act against unarmed demonstrators. Further rehabilitations followed, though as late as 1996, some individuals convicted in connection with the events had reportedly not yet been cleared. In 1996, President Boris Yeltsin issued an edict providing supplementary measures for rehabilitation and support for victims. The massacre is now openly discussed in Russia, though conflicting narratives persist, particularly regarding the exact circumstances of the shooting and the precise roles of military versus KGB units.

== Casualties ==
The official investigation conducted in the early 1990s established that 24 people were killed as a direct result of the events of 2 June 1962.

- Sixteen people were killed by gunfire in the main square (Lenin Square) or the adjacent garden.
- Five people were killed during the assault on the police station.
- Two young men wounded at the police station died later from their injuries.
- One man, A. E. Shul'man, was shot dead by a sentinel late on the night of 2 June for violating the curfew.

Among the 24 dead were three women. Eighteen of the victims were between the ages of sixteen and twenty-six. Most (twenty) were workers, including eleven from NEVZ and others from different factories (including a hairdresser killed by a stray bullet in her salon). Four were students. A significant number (fifteen, plus Shul'man) were classified by investigators as innocent bystanders rather than active participants.

Sixty-nine people were documented as having been severely wounded by gunfire. At least three required limb amputations. Scores more suffered minor injuries. Initial reports significantly understated the casualties; official KGB reports days after the event listed 20–23 dead and around 40 wounded, while rumors circulating locally and abroad claimed much higher figures, sometimes in the hundreds. Additionally, 86 soldiers and police officers were reported injured during the events of 1–2 June, though most injuries were minor.

== Significance and legacy ==
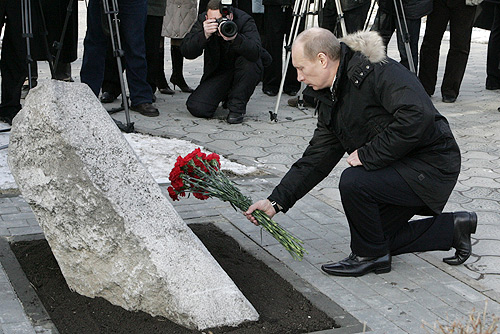
Russian President Vladimir Putin laying flowers at the Novocherkassk massacre memorial in 2008

The Novocherkassk massacre had significant short-term and long-term consequences. Although suppressed from public view for nearly three decades, the event deeply affected Soviet domestic policy and contributed to the erosion of the regime's legitimacy.

One of the most direct consequences was the leadership's reluctance to implement further nationwide increases in food prices. The Novocherkassk events demonstrated the potential for widespread unrest triggered by economic hardship. As a result, from 1962 until the collapse of the Soviet Union, the state avoided raising prices on basic foodstuffs, instead relying on increasingly massive agricultural subsidies to cover the gap between production costs and retail prices. These subsidies grew astronomically, consuming a significant portion of the state budget (estimated at 40 billion rubles annually by the early 1980s) and contributing to serious economic imbalances and stagnation.

The handling of labor unrest also changed after Novocherkassk. While attempts to form independent labor organizations continued to be harshly repressed, Leonid Brezhnev's regime generally adopted a more conciliatory approach to strikes and protests focused on economic grievances. Typically, high-ranking party or state officials were dispatched to negotiate, often resulting in rapid concessions to workers' demands regarding wages, conditions, or food supplies, and sometimes the replacement of unpopular managers. This policy maintained relative labor peace but further entrenched economic inefficiencies.

The eventual revelation of the massacre during glasnost delivered a severe blow to the credibility of the Communist Party and the Soviet state. The fact that the "workers' state" had ordered the shooting of unarmed workers protesting economic hardship starkly contradicted official ideology and propaganda. The event became a potent symbol for reformers and dissidents arguing for democratization and accountability. The comparison frequently drawn by witnesses and later commentators to the Bloody Sunday massacre of 1905—a pivotal event in undermining the legitimacy of the Tsarist regime—highlighted the continuity of state violence and repression across different political systems in Russia. The Novocherkassk massacre featured prominently in the post-Soviet indictment of the CPSU in the Constitutional Court.

== See also ==
- Dear Comrades!
- List of massacres in the Soviet Union
- East German uprising of 1953
- Hungarian Revolution of 1956
- Warsaw Pact invasion of Czechoslovakia (1968)
- 1989 Tiananmen Square protests and massacre
