= 50th Separate Operational Brigade =

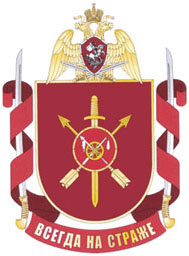
- Emblem of the brigade
- Active: 1 October 1989–present
- Country: Soviet Union (to 1991); Russia (from 1992)
- Branch: Internal Troops of the National Guard of Russia
- Role: Internal security
- Part of: Southern National Guard District
- Garrison/HQ: Kazachi Lageri
- Engagements: Nagorno-Karabakh conflict; East Prigorodny conflict; First Chechen War; Second Chechen War; Russian invasion of Ukraine

Commanders
- Current commander: Major General Mikhail Kalupin
- Notable commanders: Mikhail Labunets

The 50th Separate Operational Brigade (Russian: 50-я отдельная бригада оперативного назначения (50 ОБрОН); Military Unit 3660) is a mobile brigade of the Internal Troops of the National Guard of Russia (Rosgvardiya). Based at Kazachi Lageri, Rostov Oblast, the brigade is part of the Southern National Guard District. It was formed in 2006 from the 100th Operational Division (DON-100) of the Internal Troops that fought in the First and Second Chechen Wars.

== History ==
The 100th Operational Division (abbreviated in Russian as DON-100) of the Internal Troops was formed on 1 October 1989 by the transfer and reorganization of the 14th Tank Division of the Soviet Army. Disbanded separate units from the Baltic, Belorussian, and Kiev Military Districts were also used to form the new division. The division was based at Kazachi Lageri on the northern outskirts of Novocherkassk, where the 14th Tank Division had been stationed since its formation on 17 July 1974. The 14th Tank Division was formed to replace the 51st Tank Division, sent to Mongolia, and was part of the North Caucasus Military District. Like most units in the district it was maintained at reduced strength and only in 1980 was it upgraded to peacetime strength. The 14th included 2,500 personnel equipped with older equipment, 322 T-62 tanks, 240 BMP-1 infantry fighting vehicles, 13 BTR-60 armored personnel carriers, 72 122mm D-30 howitzers and 54 122 mm M-30 howitzers in December 1985. The T-62s replaced the small number of obsolete T-10 tanks that the division operated in the 1970s. By the late 1980s the division included the 157th Tank Regiment at Persianovsky, adjacent to Kazachi Lageri, the 158th and 159th Tank Regiments at Kazachi Lageri and the 1190th Motor Rifle Regiment at Kamensk-Shakhtinsky.

Internal Troops officer Colonel Mikhail Labunets, a future Hero of Russia, served as the first commander of the 100th Division, part of the North Caucasus Internal Troops District. Under his command, the 100th Division saw combat for the first time in December 1989 in Nagorno-Karabakh Autonomous Oblast and adjacent regions of Azerbaijan as ethnic conflict flared during the Nagorno-Karabakh conflict, supporting the "restoration of public order" and the state of emergency in the region. The division was also involved in operations in Armenia and Moldova. From May to November 1992 the division fought in support of the state of emergency in Dagestan, Kabardino-Balkaria, and Karachay-Cherkessia during ethnic conflict in those regions. From November 1992 to December 1994 DON-100 operated in the East Prigorodny conflict zone. At the beginning of the First Chechen War in December 1994 the division was sent into Chechnya, where their duties included reconnaissance and convoy escort. The 93rd Mechanized Regiment of the division was formed in September 1998, equipped with PT-76 and T-62 tanks as the only tank unit in the Internal Troops. The division also fought in the Second Chechen War, in which it included the 46th, 47th, 48th, 49th, and 57th Operational Regiments, the 93rd Mechanized Regiment and the 7th Rosich Special Purpose Detachment. The 93rd Mechanized Regiment fought in the final Battle of Grozny. For their actions in Chechnya, twelve servicemen of the division received the title Hero of Russia, ten of them posthumously, including Andrey Zozulya, Rafik Kadyrbulatov, Sergey Petrushko, Oleg Tereshkin, and Vitaly Tsymanovsky. By 2004 the division had suffered the loss of 265 men. Elements of the division were stationed in Chechnya into 2004 and also were based in North Ossetia.

In 2006, during reforms of the Internal Troops, the division was reorganized as the 50th Separate Operational Brigade. Personnel of the brigade participated in cleanup efforts in Krymsk after the 2012 Krasnodar Krai floods and in the security of the 2014 Sochi Winter Olympics and the 2018 FIFA World Cup. By the mid-2010s the brigade included the 133rd Special Motorized Regiment (Military Unit 3656) and two other special motorized regiments (Military units 3654 and 3655), the 186th Separate Engineer Battalion (Military Unit 3666) and the 7th Rosich Special Purpose Detachment (Military Unit 3719).

A conscript deserted from the brigade in mid-2019. By November 2022 a consolidated detachment from the brigade was deployed to Luhansk during the Russian invasion of Ukraine.

The brigade received new battle flags in March 2023, while commanded by Major General Mikhail Kalupin.
