= Jani Kiço Lufi =

Albanian general

Major General Jani Kiço Lufi
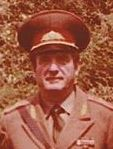
- Born: May 15, 1931; Gjirokastër, Albania
- Died: July 15, 2023 (aged 92); Krasnodar, Russia
- Children: 2
- Military career
- Allegiance: LANÇ; Albania later: Soviet Union; Russia
- Branch: Albanian People's Army (until 1961); Soviet Armed Forces; Russian Armed Forces
- Service years: 1944–1991
- Rank: Major General
- Commands: 197th Motor Rifle Division; 12th Rifle Corps; North Caucasus Military District; Southern Military District
- Conflicts: World War II; Albanian Front; Cold War; Operation Valuable
- Awards: Order of the Red Star; Order "For Service to the Homeland in the Armed Forces of the USSR"

Jani Kiço Lufi (Russian: Яны Кичо Люфи; 15 May 1931 – 15 July 2023), also known as Yan Konstantinovich Lyufi (Russian: Ян Константинович Люфи), was an Albanian military officer who served as a major general in the Soviet Armed Forces. He commanded the 197th Motorized Rifle Division from 1973 to 1977 and served as Chief of Staff of the 12th Army Corps in the North Caucasus Military District from 1977 to 1991. Later, he assumed the role of Inspector within the Inspectorate Group of the Joint Strategic Command of the Southern Military District of the Russian Armed Forces, adding another layer to his extensive military service.

== Early life ==
Jan Lufi was born in the village of Sofratik, located in the district center of Gjirokastër in southern Albania. He was born to a patriotic Albanian family. At the age of seven, he experienced the death of his father, and at eight, he started school. However, his education was cut short to just one year due to the Italian occupation of Albania, leading to the closure of schools. In March 1944, his mother died, and from April 1944 onward, Lutfi became a partisan of LANÇ.

His first combat experience as a new volunteer partisan occurred on June 9, 1944. A battalion set up an ambush on the road leading to the city of Delvina, anticipating the passage of a German convoy of trucks carrying soldiers en route to reinforce the garrison of that city. The surprise attack failed, and after a brief battle, the partisans withdrew to the mountains.

== Career in the Soviet Union ==
In the spring of 1950, having graduated from the Skanderbeg Military School, Lufi was one of the 150 cadets sent to the newly established Unified Military School in Tirana. His military prowess quickly propelled him to the position of platoon commander by the fall of 1951.

Over the years, Lufi's dedication and leadership led him through various roles, including commanding the cadet battalion in 1957. His military education continued, and by 1959, he found himself studying at the M.V. Frunze Military Academy in the Soviet Union.

However, the strained relations between Albania and the USSR posed challenges. Lufi's fortuitous absence during a holiday saved him from the persecutions orchestrated by Enver Hoxha against Albanians with Soviet education. Undeterred, he completed his studies in the Soviet Union, receiving his officer's identity card in 1962.

Post-academy, Lufi assumed command roles, from a battalion in the 201st motorized rifle regiment to the 32nd motorized Danube regiment, demonstrating excellence in leadership. His military achievements earned him the rank of major general in 1983.

== Post-service and later life ==
Retiring in 1989, Major General Lufi settled in Krasnodar, where he became actively involved in public service. Leading the organization "General Brotherhood" and serving as the assistant to the mayor of Krasnodar from 2002 to 2008, he continued contributing to his community.

In 2012, Lufi took on the role of an inspector in the inspector group of the Unified Strategic Command of the Southern Military District, actively participating in military-patriotic education and advocating for veterans' interests.

Lufi, an accomplished author, penned the book "From Albanian Partisan to Soviet General," offering insights into his extraordinary life. He died on July 21, 2023.

== Family ==
Jani Lufi married Julia Sergeevna Filaksenova in 1965. They had two sons, Andrey and Konstantin.
