= 197th Motor Rifle Division =

Motor rifle division of the Soviet military

- Active: 1966–1987
- Country: Soviet Union
- Branch: Soviet Army
- Type: Motorized infantry
- Garrison/HQ: Uryupinsk

Commanders
- Current commander: Jan Lufi

The 197th Motor Rifle Division was a motorized infantry division of the Soviet Army. The division was based in Uryupinsk and existed from 1966 to 1987. In 1987, it became a territorial training center. The training center became a road construction training brigade in 1990.

== History ==
The division was activated on 27 June 1966 in Uryupinsk, Volgograd Oblast, part of the North Caucasus Military District. The division replaced the 68th Motor Rifle Division, which was transferred to Central Asia. It is known to have included the 187th Motor Rifle Regiment, 182nd Tank Regiment and 1206th Antiaircraft Artillery Regiment. Between 1973 and 1977, the division was commanded by future major general Yan Lyufi (ru:Люфи Ян Кичо), an ethnic Albanian serving in the Soviet Army. The 34th Army Corps was activated in May 1980, and the division became part of it. During the Cold War, it was maintained at 15% strength. On 1 December 1987, it became the 881st Territorial Training Center. The training center became the 345th Road Construction Training Brigade in 1990.
