= 1st Guards Cavalry-Mechanised Group =

Unit of the Soviet Red Army

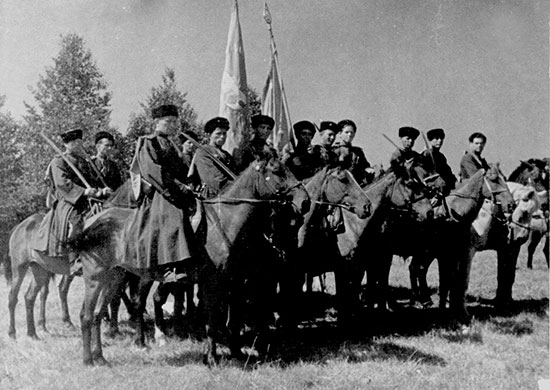
- Active: 1944–1945
- Country: Soviet Union
- Branch: Combined Arms
- Type: Mobile unit
- Engagements: World War Two: Operation Bagration; Battle of Debrecen; Siege of Budapest; Vienna Offensive; Prague Offensive

Commanders
- Notable commanders: Issa Pliyev

1st Guards Cavalry-Mechanised Group (Russian: 1-я гвардейская кавалерийская механизированная группа) was a tactical-operational formation of the Soviet Red Army during the Second World War, first serving under the 1st Belorussian Front under the command of Marshal Konstantin Rokossovsky over the course of Operation Bagration, later being transferred to General Rodion Malinovsky's 2nd Ukrainian Front to aid in its offensive into Hungary, Austria and ultimately Czechoslovakia. Commanded by the experienced and talented Guards Lieutenant General Issa Pliev, the Cavalry-Mechanised Group(KMG) proved itself to be an indispensable element of the Red Army in its attempts to destroy the German Wehrmacht on the Belorussian and Ukrainian axes.

== Organisation and Objectives ==
The 1st Guards KMG was an operational formation consisting of the 4th Guards Cavalry Corps, 9th Tank Corps and 1st Mechanised Corps, with its main role being similar to that of the Soviet tank armies - to be an integral element of the exploitation elements of the Soviet fronts that would be committed to strike deep into the enemy territories and subsequently isolate and annihilate major enemy groupings once the enemy lines had been broken through.

It can be seen that the KMG possessed a crucial role in the Soviet offensive efforts, especially since the tides of the war in 1944 had turned in the favour of the Soviet Red Army, and its main objective then would be to destroy vital Wehrmacht groupings such as Army Group Centre, which was sitting on the salient in Belorussia known as the Belorussian Balcony, as the mobility of the cavalry in travelling across the marshy, difficult terrain with its firepower augmented by the tank and mechanised formations would be the recipe of success for the pursuit or isolation of major enemy formations, as proved during Operation Bagration and the offensives undertaken by the Red Army in Hungary. As the prominent researcher in the field of Soviet history, Chris Bellamy, had commented, the concept of the KMG was an "anachronistic" yet "effective" approach to utilising mobile forces in the vigorous attempts to destroy the German Army Group Centre during the summer operations of 1944, demonstrating that despite the fact that the use of the cavalry with armoured troops was an obsolete method of fighting given the declining relevance of the horse soldiers during the Second World War, its combat-effectiveness would render the KMG an extremely useful and instrumental tool of the Red Army in its pursuit of victory.

== Soviet Offensive Operations 1944–1945 ==
Over the course of the third phase of the Great Patriotic War, the KMG had served alongside the 1st Belorussian Front commanded by General Konstantin Rokossovsky, before be transferred to conduct exploitational operations on the sector of the 2nd Ukrainian Front during the Debrecen Offensive and the subsequent engagements that brought the Red Army into Central Europe, making it a significant and integral element of the Soviet mobile forces.

=== Operation Bagration ===
During the planning of Operation Bagration, which ended on 20 May 1944, General Konstantin Rokossovsky proposed that the operations conducted on the axis of the 1st Belorussian Front be split into two main efforts - one aiming for the major rail junction of Bobruisk, while the other, spearheaded by KMG Pliev, would travel through the Pripet Marshes and capture the stronghold of Slutsk, the transportation junction which could potentially offer the rail lines for the German 9th Army stationed mainly in Bobruisk to escape to the south. Despite initially facing some opposition from the other officers of the Stavka High Command and even Joseph Stalin himself, Rokossovsky did not succumb to the skepticisms of the other commanders and insisted on the execution of such a multi-pronged approach that would later prove to be effective in devastating the 9th Army, then commanded by General Hans Jordan.

On 24 June 1944, 7000 guns, mortars and Katyusha multiple rocket launchers were unleashed upon the German 9th Army in a classic approach dictated by the Deep Operations doctrine, with the artillery preparation crippling the forward lines of defence of the opponents, allowing them to be weakened for the rifle units and the supporting independent tank brigades to break the tactical zone of defence, such that the exploitation echelon could be committed to increase the magnitude and the depth of the assault. While Generals Prokofi Romanenko and Pavel Batov's 48th Army and 65th Army advanced towards Bobruisk, Alexander Luchinsky's 28th Army began to move across the Pripet Marshes in pursuit of Slutsk, and attached to the formation was KMG Pliev.

As the German Army Group Centre's main Luftwaffe formation, Luftflotte VI, only possessed 40 fighter aircraft, the air was soon dominated by the Soviet Red Air Force, which dedicated over 5300 aircraft to the operation in order to substantiate the Red Army's advance, allowing the Soviets to strafe the German supply lines, while also constantly putting their ground forces under bombardments and attack, greatly hindering the Wehrmacht's ability to halt the communist offensive. On the ground, KMG Pliev comprised the 4th Guards Cavalry Corps that main relied on transportation by horseback, enabling these troops to traverse the adverse terrain of the Pripet Marshes more effortlessly than the wheeled or tracked vehicles, while the group's firepower and mobility would also be augmented by the 9th Tank Corps and 1st Mechanised Corps. While the tanks and armoured vehicles from the tank and mechanised corps, such as the T34-85 medium tanks and IS-2 heavy tanks, could provide cover for the advancing cavalry, the horsemen were capable of dismounting rapidly and engaging the opponents, or charging against them with their Cossack shashka drawn.

With KMG Pliev advancing hastily across the Pripet Marshes, the group outflanked the 5th Panzer Division commanded by General Karl Decker, overpowering the armoured unit and driving further in the northwest direction. From 28 to 30 June, the cavalrymen engaged Kampfgruppe von Vormann led by General Nikolaus von Vormann, which consisted of the Hungarian 1st Cavalry Division. The entirety of Army Group Centre began to collapse due to simultaneous Red Army operational gains from the Vietbesk-Orsha axes in the north all the way to the Bobruisk sector in the south, as well as Adolf Hitler's order for the formation of the fester platz, also known as the fortress cities, which, in essence, meant that the German troops were required to hold their positions and not withdraw despite being encircled, outnumbered or outgunned. After two days of ferocious clashing and an alleged sabre-to-sabre confrontation between the 4th Guards Cavalry Corps and Hungarian 1st Cavalry Division, the KMG ultimately emerged victorious and ousted the German battle group from the fester platz Slutsk by 30 June 1944, while also crossing the River Berezina. In the north, Bobruisk was also captured by the 65th Army after the Germans failed to effectively commit the 12th Panzer Division to aid the 9th Army in its struggle, causing the stronghold to be liberated by the Soviets on the 29th of June as the urban fighting in the city came to an end, while 9th Army was also consequentially annihilated.

The offensive operation conducted against Slutsk saw the success of KMG Pliev against both the 5th Panzer Division and Kampfgruppe von Vormann. While the victory of the Soviets could be attributed to the stubborn, unyielding leadership of Hitler and his General Staff, the bravery and combat-effectiveness of the cavalrymen and the armoured troops were extremely evident during this operation, with the KMG outmanoeuvering both the panzer division and battering the Kampfgruppe led by the experienced General von Vormann, while striking so rapidly against the Pripet Marshes by advancing from Parichi all the way to Slutsk, before capturing the fortress and threatening the distant communication junction of Baranovichi. Ultimately, despite efforts of Marshal Ernst Busch, the commander of the Army Group Centre, to reinforce the city to prevent it from falling into the hands of the 1st Belorussian Front, the KMG still managed to advance up to 100 kilometres in 3 days and seized the crucial fortress by early July. The speed of the cavalry in travelling across the challenging terrain that would bog down most vehicles and the ability of the formation to capture the fortress cities so rapidly would therefore not just demonstrate that the formation established by the cavalry and tank corps was an ideal combination, but would also exemplify the talented and careful leadership of the formation's commander, Lieutenant General Issa Pliyev. The contribution of the KMG in the stupendous victory of the 1st Belorussian Front in the offensive against Slutsk was, indeed, unprecedented.
