= 195th Rifle Division =

195th Rifle Division (March 14, 1941 – December 27, 1941) 195th Rifle Division (December 30, 1941 – July 15, 1946)
- Active: 1941–1946
- Country: Soviet Union
- Branch: Red Army
- Type: Infantry
- Size: Division
- Engagements: Operation Barbarossa; Battle of Kiev (1941); Case Blue; Operation Little Saturn; Operation Gallop; Third Battle of Kharkov; Donbas strategic offensive (August 1943); Battle of the Dnieper; Nikopol–Krivoi Rog offensive Bereznegovatoye–Snigirevka offensive Odessa Offensive; First Jassy–Kishinev offensive Second Jassy–Kishinev offensive Bulgarian offensive
- Decorations: Order of the Red Banner (2nd formation)
- Battle honours: Novomoskovsk (2nd Formation)

Commanders
- Notable commanders: Maj. Gen. Vitalii Nikolaevich Nesmelov; Kombrig Mikhail Afanasevich Romanov; Col. Mikhail Gerasimovich Mikeladze; Maj. Gen. Vasily Karuna; Col. Yakov Semyonovich Mikheenko; Col. Aleksandr Mikhailovich Suchkov; Col. Ivan Sergeevich Shapkin

The 195th Rifle Division was an infantry division of the Red Army, originally formed as part of the prewar buildup of forces, based on the shtat (table of organization and equipment) of September 13, 1939. It first began forming just months before the German invasion in the Kiev Special Military District. When the German invasion began it was in 31st Rifle Corps in the reserves of Southwestern Front. In the first days of July it was assigned to 5th Army, where it remained for the duration of this formation. This Army was considered by the German high command as a threat to the flanks of both Army Groups Center and South and was one of the main reasons behind the decision to encircle Southwestern Front east of Kyiv in September. The 195th was trapped in this pocket and destroyed, although not officially written off until late December.

A new 195th was designated at the end of December, based on the 423rd Rifle Division, which had begun forming in October in the South Ural Military District. In total it took over six months forming up and training before it went to the active front in the vicinity of Voronezh as part of 60th Army. During the summer and into October it was steadily weakened in attritional fighting along the Don River until it was removed to the Reserve of the Supreme High Command for rebuilding. It soon returned to the front along the Don, now as part of 1st Guards Army in Southwestern Front. It would remain in this Front (later renamed 3rd Ukrainian) until nearly the end of 1944. As part of 4th Guards Rifle Corps it took part in Operation Little Saturn and made one of the first penetrations into the defenses of Italian 8th Army. Once this Army had been effectively destroyed the 195th took part in Operation Gallop, driving into the Donbas region before being halted and temporarily encircled in Field Marshal E. von Manstein's "backhand blow" in February/March 1943. It resumed the offensive in August, advancing into eastern Ukraine and winning a battle honor as it approached the Dniepr River. Just a month later it took a leading role in the liberation of Dniprodzerzhynsk, for which it was awarded the Order of the Red Banner. Over the winter of 1943-44 it took part in the battles in the Dniepr bend under command of 46th Army before driving deeper into western Ukraine, taking part in the liberation of Voznesensk, where its commander was killed. It was then reassigned to 37th Army, and it would remain under that command for the duration of the war. Serving in the 6th Guards Rifle Corps of this Army the 195th advanced to the Dniestr River in early April, where it helped to establish a substantial bridgehead in the Tiraspol area, but this was contained by German reinforcements and 3rd Ukrainian Front went over to the defensive for several months. At the start of the August offensive it was in the second echelon of 6th Guards Corps, but on the second day played a key role in breaking the second German defense line, after which it took part in the pursuit, within days taking part in the encirclement and defeat of the forces of German 6th Army. Following this victory it advanced into Romania and Bulgaria, eventually becoming part of the occupation force of the latter country when the 37th Army was detached from 3rd Ukrainian Front. Postwar, it was part of the Southern Group of Forces, until it was moved to the Odesa Military District in early 1946, being disbanded there in July.

== 1st Formation ==
The division began forming on March 14, 1941, as part of the prewar buildup of Soviet forces, in the Kiev Special Military District. Its order of battle was as follows:

- 564th Rifle Regiment
- 573rd Rifle Regiment
- 604th Rifle Regiment
- 505th Artillery Regiment
- 475th Howitzer Artillery Regiment
- 41st Antitank Battalion
- 215th Antiaircraft Battalion
- 330th Reconnaissance Battalion
- 362nd Sapper Battalion
- 546th Signal Battalion
- 18th Medical/Sanitation Battalion
- 200th Chemical Defense (Anti-gas) Company
- 253rd Motor Transport Battalion
- 702nd Field Postal Station
- 594th Field Office of the State Bank

Maj. Gen. Vitalii Nikolaevich Nesmelov was appointed to command on the day the division began forming. He had been serving as assistant commanding officer of the Special Rifle Corps. On June 22, as the German invasion began, the Kiev District became Southwestern Front; the 195th was in 31st Rifle Corps with the 193rd and 200th Rifle Divisions in the Front reserves. The division itself was near Snovidovichi. By the morning of June 26 it was concentrated at Stepany, but was not committed to action since the division was still barely formed and was still trying to fill up with mobilized reservists.

=== Battle of Kyiv ===
As of July 1 the 31st Corps had been incorporated into 5th Army, but without the 195th, which was still held in Front reserve. The next day it rejoined it corps-mates, and in the next week it was reduced to less than 3,500 personnel and had lost most of its heavy weapons.

By July 11 the much-reduced 195th was located northeast of Novohrad-Volynskyi, facing the 14th Panzer Division, which had forced a crossing of the Sluch River there. Three days later, it had been pulled back to positions southeast of Yemilchyne, acting as a backstop to the rest of 31st Corps, as well as the 69th Rifle Division. The presence of 5th Army in this region was beginning to affect German strategy as noted in Führer directive No. 33 of July 19:

The Kiev fortifications and the Soviet 5th Army's operations on our rear have inhibited active operations and free maneuver on Army Group South's northern flank.

The directive set the task, among others, "to destroy the Soviet 5th Army by means of a closely coordinated offensive by the forces on Army Group Center's southern flank and Army Group South's northern flank."

Over the following weeks the division made a well-organized retreat, falling back to a line along the Uzh River by the end of August 11, but continuous combat was wearing the division down; by August 19 it had only 1,575 personnel on strength, less than half the strength of a prewar rifle regiment. Gomel fell to forces of German 2nd Army on the same date, which effectively unhinged the defenses of the Soviet 21st Army east of the Dnieper. The commander of Southwestern Front, Marshal S. M. Budyonny, signalled the STAVKA that this Army's divisions were withdrawing to a line some 20km north of the Repki region, where elements of 31st Corps were organizing defenses. Meanwhile, in late August the 2nd Panzer Group and 2nd Army of Army Group Center began their drives southward. By September 10 the remnants of 5th Army were grouped north of Kozelets. General Nesmelov was severely wounded on the same date; he was evacuated but was never given another command at the front after leaving hospital a year later.

On September 16 the 2nd Panzers linked up with the 1st Panzer Group of Army Group South well to the east and the Army was deeply encircled. The division was effectively destroyed by September 20, although, as was the case with most divisions in the Kyiv encirclement, it was not officially written off until December 27.

== 2nd Formation ==
In October a new division, designated as the 423rd, began forming in the South Ural Military District. By December 30 it had been relocated to the Orenburg Oblast of the Volga Military District where it was redesignated as the 195th. Its order of battle was very similar to that of the 1st formation:

- 564th Rifle Regiment
- 573rd Rifle Regiment
- 604th Rifle Regiment
- 505th Artillery Regiment
- 41st Antitank Battalion
- 330th Reconnaissance Battalion
- 362nd Sapper Battalion
- 546th Signal Battalion (later 546th, 1571st Signal Companies)
- 18th Medical/Sanitation Battalion
- 502nd Chemical Defense (Anti-gas) Company
- 253rd Motor Transport Battalion
- 422nd Field Bakery
- 887th Divisional Veterinary Hospital
- 1677th Field Postal Station
- 1078th Field Office of the State Bank

Kombrig Mikhail Afanasevich Romanov was appointed to command on the day the division was redesignated. He had previously led the 277th Rifle Division. The division was formed with about 8,000 personnel, including 3,000 men from Uzbekistan and the "ethnic" republics of the Transcaucasus and Bashkirs. On April 29, 1942 the division moved to the Ryazan Oblast of the Moscow Military District, where it was assigned to the 1st Reserve Army in the Reserve of the Supreme High Command. On June 16, Kombrig Romanov was moved to the 193rd Rifle Division, where he took up duties as deputy commander. He was badly wounded on July 27 and captured while the division was in encirclement. He survived the war and, after being repatriated, furthered his military education but had to leave service in 1950 due to illness. Col. Mikhail Gerasimovich Mikeladze took over the 195th. A Georgian by nationality he had been employed by the STAVKA on special assignments since the beginning of the war.

In late June the division was shifted to 3rd Reserve Army, which was activated as the 2nd formation of 60th Army on July 10, in Voronezh Front. The Army had a total of seven rifle divisions under command.

=== Battles on the Don ===
The 195th went into action the same day, defending the road to Voronezh from the advance of the German 2nd Army's VII Army Corps. By July 15, 60th Army had been driven out of the city and the 195th was deployed directly north of it. On July 22, the Army launched heavy assaults against the defenses northwest of Voronezh. Catching VII Corps in the middle of a divisional relief, the 161st Rifle Division was able to push to the Don River 10km northwest of the city, while the 107th Rifle Division, with part of the 25th Tank Corps, was able to cut the main German supply route to the west. However, the assault soon faltered under withering antitank and artillery fire, which forced the attackers back from the road. Farther east, the remainder of 25th Tanks, together with the 195th and 303rd Rifle Divisions, plus the battalions of 18th Tank Corps, fought their way into Voronezh's northern suburbs, and the Army's 121st Rifle Division, supported by 17th Tank Corps, struck the defenses on the east side of the city.

The city's suburbs saw intense fighting for several days more. However, despite their best efforts, the attacking Soviet forces were unable to sustain the offensive. Although they were able to retain a small wedge in German defenses east of the Don at Semiluki, heavy air strikes and counterattacks repulsed or halted any subsequent attacks. On August 31, Colonel Mikeladze left the division and soon became the chief of staff of 46th Army, being promoted to the rank of major general at the same time. He would later command the 7th and 10th Guards Airborne Divisions and ended the war leading the 13th Rifle Corps. He was replaced by Col. Vasily Karuna, who had previously led the 113th Cavalry Division. This officer would be promoted to major general on February 14, 1943. Over the next few months along the Don the 195th was reduced to 4,500 personnel by steady attrition, and on October 11 it returned to the Reserve of the Supreme High Command for rebuilding.

== Operation Little Saturn ==
The rebuilding proceeded quickly, and on October 23 the division was assigned to the 4th Guards Rifle Corps in the 2nd formation of 1st Guards Army. These formations returned to the front on November 4 in Southwestern Front. By early December the 195th had 9,201 officers and men on strength, armed with 6,536 rifles and carbines, 844 submachine guns, 225 light machine guns, 78 heavy machine guns, 145 mortars of all calibres, 21 45mm antitank guns and 12 76mm cannons.

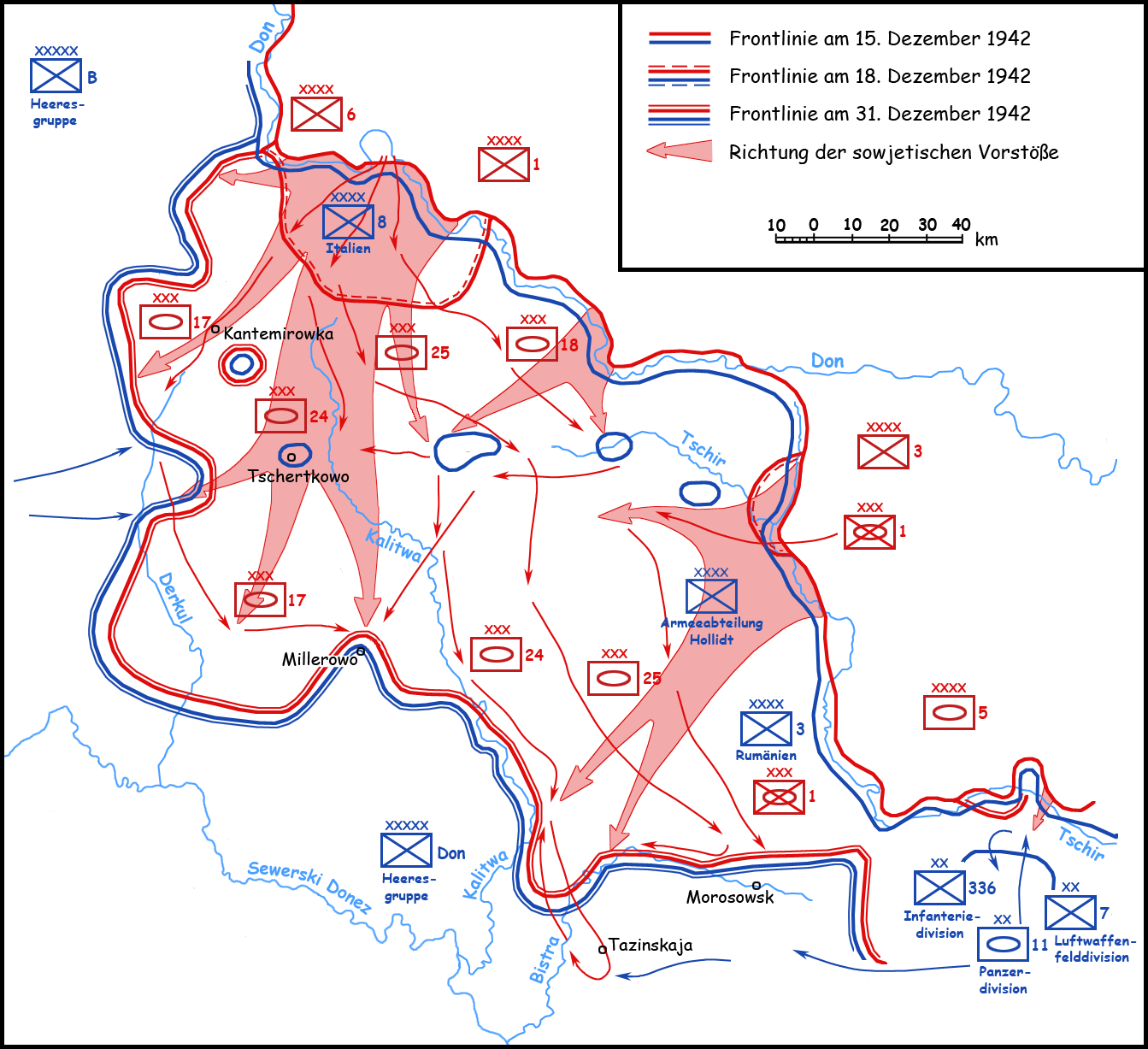
Operation Little Saturn. Note position of 1st Guards Army, marked "1".

The STAVKA's original plan for Operation Saturn envisaged the 1st, 2nd and 3rd Guards Armies driving south from the Don to Rostov-na-Donu after the encirclement of German 6th Army at Stalingrad. However, it was forced to trim sails when the 2nd Guards was diverted to repel the German effort to relieve 6th Army. The new plan was intended to destroy the Axis allied armies south and west of the Don and Chir Rivers, and then end the air supply of 6th Army by capturing the airfields it was based from. The targets were the Italian 8th Army and Army Group Hollidt, which was made up of the remnants of Romanian 3rd Army and the German XXXXVIII Panzer Corps. These forces defended a 280km-wide sector along the Don, Chir and Krivaya Rivers. Given its strength and relative experience the 195th was designated as an assault division for the offensive.

When the offensive began on December 16 the 1st Guards Army had most of its rifle divisions and all its tank corps concentrated on an 18km front on the Don's left bank. After a 90-minute artillery preparation, which was partially obstructed by thick fog, the infantry attacked at 0930 hours. Due to the poor visibility a portion of the Italian-German positions had escaped the artillery and these opened a powerful fire on the attackers, while also staging counterattacks with tanks. The 41st Guards Rifle Division, also part of 4th Guards Corps, met especially powerful resistance. At around noon the 195th achieved a breakthrough of the first defense line and reached some of the upper slopes.

As the breakthrough was proceeding more slowly than planned, the Army commander, Lt. Gen. V. I. Kuznetsov, decided to commit elements of the tank corps to help the infantry. The 25th and 18th Tank Corps began moving at 1100, soon followed by 17th Tank Corps of the adjacent 6th Army. These soon ran into minefields in front of the more prominent Italian positions, and would be forced to create passages in them overnight. By the end of the day the 195th had advanced further towards Krasno-Orekhovoe. This objective would be taken overnight.

25th Tanks attacked the garrison on height 197.0 at 0600 hours on December 17 and, after crushing its resistance, continued attacking toward Gadyuche. During the morning the Italian and German forces launched numerous counterattacks, but by noon the Italian 3rd Infantry Division "Ravenna" began falling back to the south. This was the signal for 1st Guards Army's pursuit to begin. At dawn on December 18 all of the Army's leading forces became engaged. Its right-flank formations, including the 195th, with air and tank support, took Dantsevka, Krasnodar, and Raskovka, and reached the southern bank of the Bogucharka River by noon. This effectively broke the last Axis defense line allowing the advance to speed up. 4th Guards Corps, facing little organized resistance, reached a line from Popovka to Barsuki by the end of the day. Under the combined blows of infantry and tanks, demoralized Italian units began to retreat.

=== Pursuit of 8th Army ===
On December 19 the 1st Guards Army reached the line Byk–Chikun–Poltavka–Dyachenkovo with any and all units that were, or could be, motorized. The Front commander, Col. Gen. N. F. Vatutin, now tasked Kuznetsov with surrounding and taking out the Axis Boguchar–Migulinskaya group of forces. The 4th Guards Corps continued towards Millerovo, while most of his remaining forces carried out the encirclement. This was completed on December 21, trapping some 20,000 Axis troops. On December 24 the Army reached the line Krizskoe–Millerovo and the second stage of the offensive ended.

Beginning on December 28 and continuing the next day the 195th attacked the 3rd Battalion of the 19th Panzer Division's 73rd Panzergrenadier Regiment in Bondarevka, while the 35th and 41st Guards Divisions besieged the town of Chertkovo, a communications center held by German and Italian troops. Over the next ten days the 4th Guards Corps continued to battle for these positions as the advance on the west side of 1st Guards Army's penetration became a tentative stalemate. The Army laid siege to Chertkovo, Millerovo, and other strongpoints and also held off advances by Army Detachment Fretter-Pico to relieve those places.

== Operation Gallop ==
During mid-to-late January, 1943, the forces of Voronezh Front would effectively destroy the remaining forces of Italian 8th Army and Hungarian 2nd Army in the Ostrogozhsk–Rossosh offensive. On January 26, Kuznetsov submitted his plan to the Front for operations north and west of Voroshilovgrad. In part, this stated that the 78th and 195th Divisions were to capture Barvinkove by concentric attacks and dig in by the eighth day.

Southwestern Front returned to the offensive on January 30, at 0850 hours following an artillery preparation. Axis forces put up stubborn resistance but were pushed back along all sectors and fell back 15km along the main axis. 1st Guards Army, in cooperation with Lt. Gen. M. M. Popov's mobile group, attacked along its right flank throughout the day. Part of 41st Guards blocked Novo-Astrakhan while the remainder, along with the rest of 4th Guards Corps, captured Bunchuzhna, Peschana and Zhitlovka.

As the offensive continued, on February 14 General Vatutin issued a report that stated in part:

4. The 1st Guards Army on the right flank captured Orelka and Yurevka in night fighting and throughout 13.2.1943 was consolidating along its new line, while holding Lozovaya and Barvenkovo. In the center the army, while repelling numerous counterattacks... continued fighting fiercely for Slavyansk. During the night of 12-13.2.1943 units of the 41st Guards Rifle Division abandoned Bylbasovka and fell back to its northern outskirts under pressure from numerous enemy counterattacks.

Vatutin submitted a plan on February 17 proposing that his forces advance all the way to the Dnieper. In part it proposed that 1st Guards Army "tie down the enemy along the Slavyansk and Krymskaia front with the forces of four rifle divisions and capture Slavyansk by the end of 18 February 1943." In a further report on February 18, Vatutin stated that the 4th Guards Corps had been subordinated to the 6th Army; the 195th was transferred to 6th Guards Rifle Corps, still in 1st Guards Army.

=== Third Battle of Kharkiv ===
The situation quickly changed when Army Group South launched a counteroffensive against the overextended 1st Guards and 6th Armies the next day. At 0500 hours on February 23, Vatutin reported on the deteriorating situation, stating that 6th Guards Corps had completed a march to a new concentration area the previous day, and that the 195th approached Dubovo with its lead column, with the objective of being in the Yakobinka region by the end of February 22. Finally understanding the deadly threat facing his Front, at 0410 on February 24 Vatutin ordered Popov's mobile group to be disbanded, with its remnants used to reinforce 1st Guards Army. It was doing its best to hold Lozovo in a prolonged battle throughout the day. 6th Guards Corps was in Parkhomenko, Nizhnii Ukrainskii, Dobropole, Sofievka, Blagodat, and Razdole, while repelling attacks by up to 2-3 regiments of infantry, supported by 60-70 tanks.

Despite the realities, Vatutin continued to try to revive his offensive by forming new shock groups. On February 24 he further ordered:

A. The 1st Guards Army's 6th Guards Rifle Corps, after leaving one rifle division in the Lozovaya region, will break contact with the enemy and reach the Barvenkovo region by forced march by the morning of 25 February with its remaining divisions.
Together with your [Popov's] group, the 52nd Rifle Division will attack and defeat the enemy and capture the Barvenkovo region.

The unreality of this is emphasized by the fact that there were no communications between Popov and Kuznetsov. However, nothing Vatutin could do halted the attacks of three panzer corps. He dutifully reported to the STAVKA at 0200 hours on February 28, among other items, that the 195th continued to fight encircled in the Marinopole, Valerianovka, Novo-Morokino, and Chervonogo Shpil regions at 1600 the previous day. It had been given the mission of reaching the line from Vekikaya Kamyshevakha to Dmitrovka. Over the following days there was nothing Vatutin could do to retrieve the situation. By March 3 the III Panzer Corps was pressing 6th Guards Corps northward from the Sloviansk region to the Northern Donets River in the sector from Izium to Voroshilovgrad. The counteroffensive finally ended when German forces recaptured Belgorod on March 17. On March 13, General Karuna left the 195th. Two months later he took command of the 152nd Rifle Division, but he was killed in action on September 30 while preparing his division for an assault crossing of the Dnieper. The new commander of the 195th was Col. Yakov Semyonovich Mikheenko, who had previously served as deputy commander of the 44th Guards Rifle Division.

== Into Ukraine ==
The division remained in 6th Guards Corps of 1st Guards Army into May as it recovered from its ordeal. During that month it was withdrawn into the Army reserves for further rebuilding, before returning to the Corps in June. In July, it returned to 4th Guards Corps, which itself had returned to 1st Guards Army. Colonel Mikheenko left the division on July 2; he would later command the 1st Guards Airborne Division. He was replaced the next day by Col. Aleksandr Mikhailovich Suchkov, who had been serving as chief of staff of 6th Guards Corps before a hospitalization beginning in April.

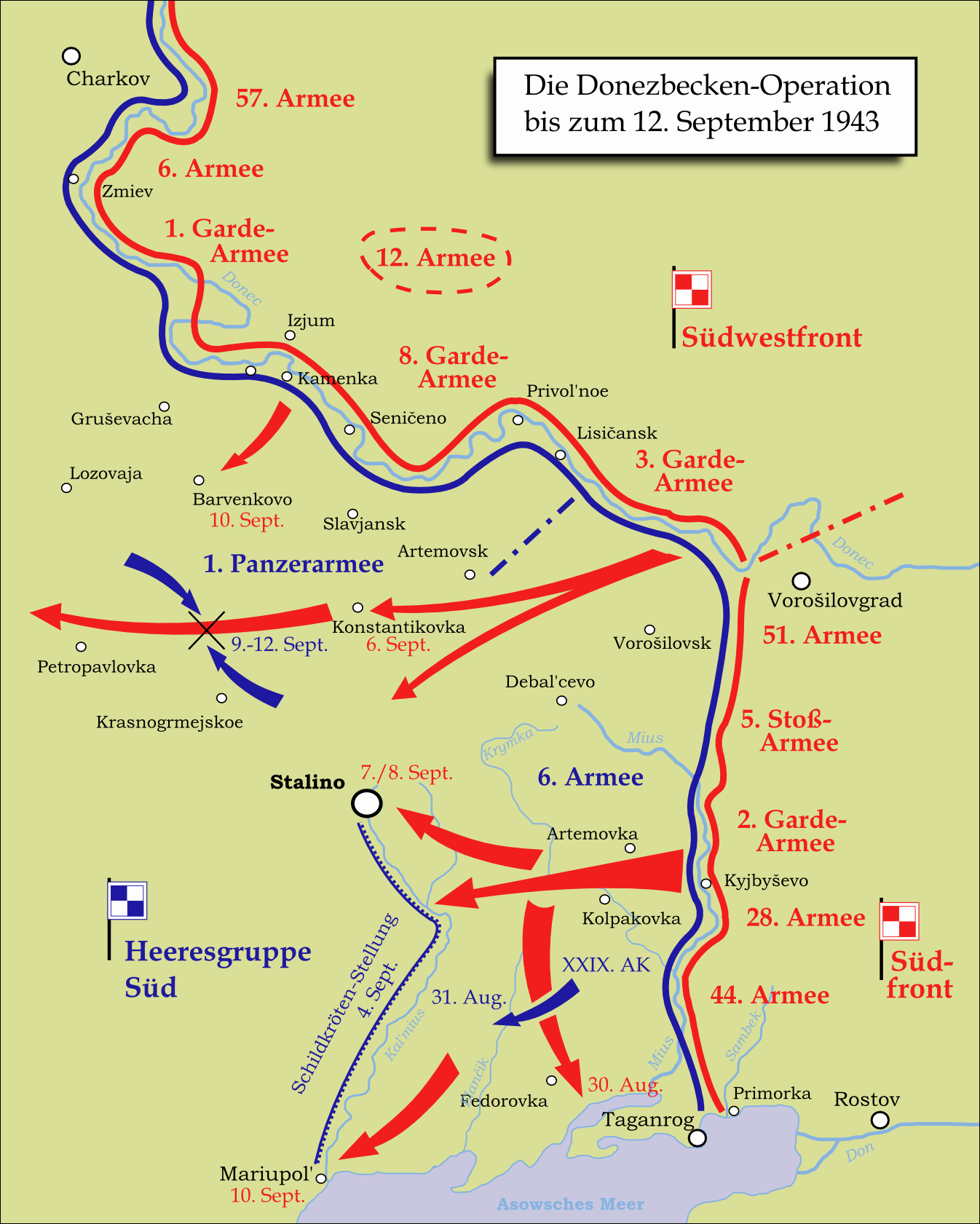
Map of the Donbas Offensive (in German)

On August 13, following the Soviet victory at Kursk, 1st Guards Army was still in much the same positions it had taken up in March, along the Northern Donets north of Izium. Southwestern Front went over to the offensive against 1st Panzer Army on that date, and was joined by Southern Front against the rebuilt German 6th Army on August 18. 1st Panzer's line held initially, despite what was described as the heaviest artillery and mortar fire yet seen in the war. 6th Army had worse luck, and by August 20 a large gap had been blown in its line which proved to be impossible to close. By August 23, 1st Panzer was also in trouble, as its army corps south of Izium had been reduced to a combat strength of 5,800 men and a continuous line could not be held. On August 31, Field Marshal von Manstein authorized the two German armies to fall back to the Kalmius River. By this time the 195th had returned to 6th Guards Corps.

On the night of September 4, the two armies went into the Kalmius line, and the 6th Army commander declared there would be no more withdrawals. However, on the morning of September 6 a slashing attack by 1st Guards Mechanized Corps and nine rifle divisions utterly compromised the boundary between 6th and 1st Panzer Armies and the commander of the latter stated that there was no other recourse but to retreat to the Dnieper. On September 8, Hitler approved "in principle" their retreat to the Wotan position between Melitopol and the Dnieper north of Zaporizhzhia. The retreat did not end there, and on September 22 the 195th became the only rifle division awarded an honorific for the liberation of Novomoskovsk. By the beginning of October it was under direct Army command, but later that month it was transferred to 34th Rifle Corps in 46th Army. It was under these commands when this Army forced a crossing of the Dnieper and liberated Dniprodzerzhynsk on October 25, for which the division was immediately awarded the Order of the Red Banner.

=== Nikopol-Krivoi Rog Offensive ===
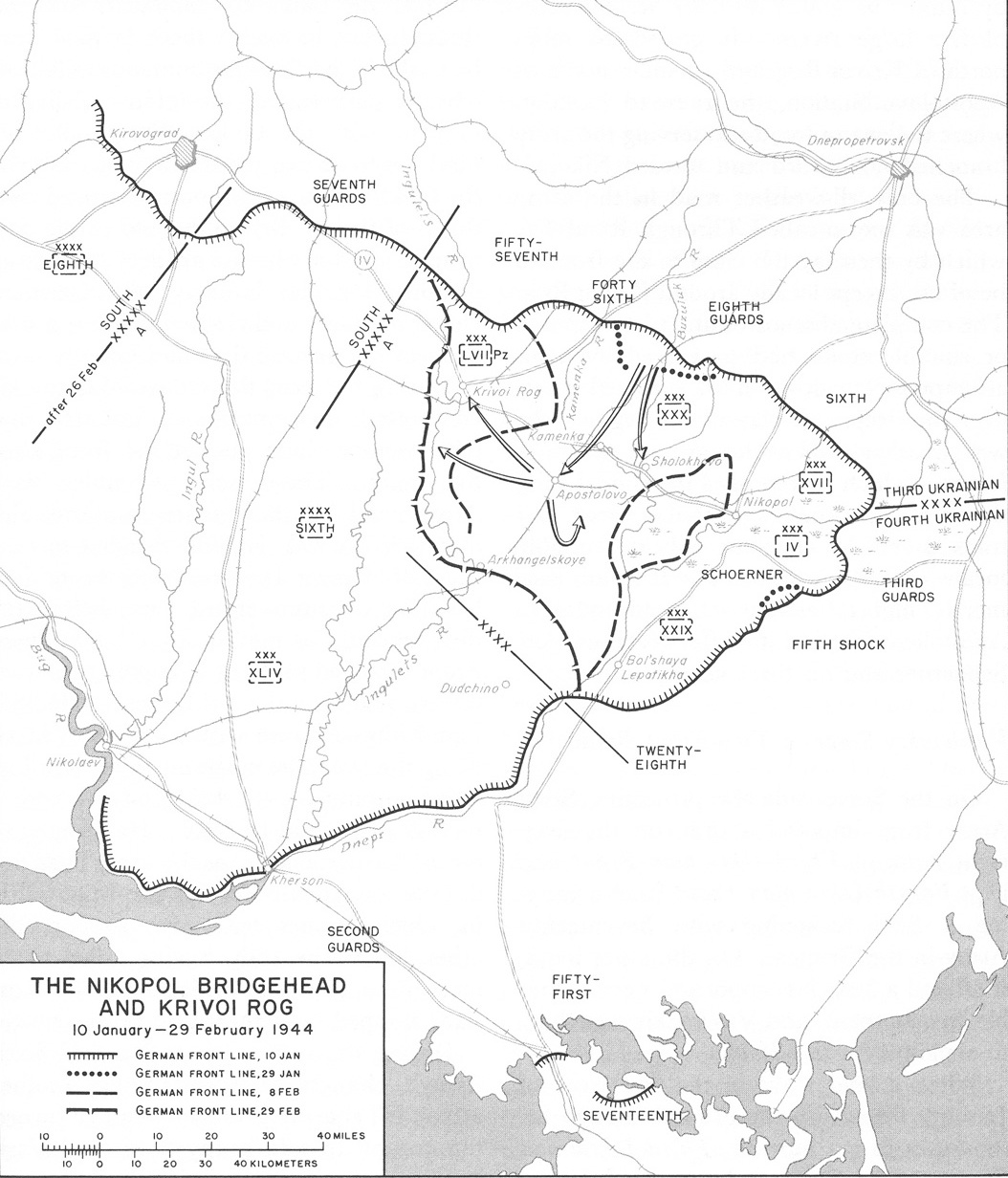
Nikopol-Krivoi Rog Offensive

3rd Ukrainian Front had made an earlier effort to take Kryvyi Rih in December, but this proved abortive. The Front's first effort to renew the drive began on January 10, 1944, led mainly by 46th Army, but made only modest gains at considerable cost and was halted on the 16th. The offensive was renewed on January 30 after a powerful artillery preparation against the positions of the German XXX Army Corps on the same sector of the line, but this was met with a counter-barrage that disrupted the attack. A new effort the next day, backed by even heavier artillery and air support, made progress but still did not penetrate the German line.

On February 1 the XXX Corps line was pierced in several places and by nightfall the Soviet forces had torn a 9km-wide gap in the line west of the Bazavluk River. During the next two days German 6th Army tried to avoid encirclement by slogging through the mud to the Kamianka River line, which was already compromised by the Soviet advance. Forward detachments of 8th Guards Army reached Apostolove on the 4th and over the next few days 46th Army began to attempt a sweep westward to envelop Kryvyi Rih from the south. The dispersion of the Front's forces, combined with German reserves produced by the evacuation of the Nikopol bridgehead east of the Dnieper and indecision on the part of the German high command, produced "a peculiar sort of semiparalysis" on this part of the front during the second half of the month. Finally, on February 21 elements of the 46th and 37th Armies broke into the outer defenses of Kryvyi Rih. To avoid costly street fighting 6th Army was withdrawn west of the city, which was liberated the next day. By the start of March the 195th had been moved to 31st Guards Rifle Corps, still in 46th Army.

=== Bereznegovatoye–Snigirevka Offensive ===
The commander of 3rd Ukrainian Front, Army Gen. R. Ya. Malinovskii, launched a new offensive against 6th Army on March 4. He threw a guards mechanized corps plus the three Guards rifle corps of 8th Guards Army against the German center and soon secured a foothold across the Inhulets River. By the third day the penetration had grown to a depth of 8km, allowing the 4th Guards Mechanized and 4th Guards Cavalry Corps to break loose and push straight through 40km to Novyi Buh, the headquarters 6th Army, causing considerable turmoil. On the night of March 11, Hitler ordered his 6th to end its retreat "at the latest" on the Southern Buh River.

In the second week of the month Malinovskii had enough strength gathered around Novyi Buh to strike due south into the Buh Liman at Mykolaiv and encircle the southern half of 6th Army or carry the offensive west to get across the Buh behind the entire 6th. The fact that he tried to do both ultimately saved the German force. 46th Army, almost entirely infantry, was sent west toward the Buh above Nova Odesa. The splitting of the Soviet forces allowed 6th Army to first fight its way through 8th Guards and then the 46th two days later. In addition, 8th Guards began to suffer supply difficulties, especially for its tanks, which delayed the drive for Mykolaiv. As a result only three of the 6th Army's divisions had to break out of complete encirclement and by March 21 it had established a solid front on the Buh. On March 23, as Colonel Suchkov was directing his division in the fighting for Voznesensk, he was killed in action. He was replaced three days later by Col. Ivan Nikolaevich Kholodov, but this officer in turn was replaced on April 22 by Col. Ivan Sergeevich Shapkin, who had previously commanded the 52nd Rifle Brigade and would lead the 195th into peacetime. By April 1, the division had returned to 6th Guards Corps, which was now in 37th Army. It would remain in this Army into the postwar.

== Jassy-Kishinev Offensives ==
At this time the Army, under command of Lt. Gen. M. N. Sharokhin, had nine rifle divisions under command, and the 6th Guards Corps contained the 195th and the 20th Guards Rifle Division. Late on April 11 the forward elements of the Army were approaching the Dniestr in the Tiraspol sector. Malinovskii had ordered Sharokhin on April 8 to pursue German forces to the river with three rifle corps advancing abreast, capture Tiraspol, force the river from the march in the sector 1.5km north of Parcani southward to around Slobozia. This was to create a bridgehead roughly 24km wide and 10km deep on the river's western bank, prior to continuing the pursuit toward Chișinău. The bridgehead area was low-lying, dotted with small lakes and swamps, traversed by many smaller rivers, and was dominated by high ground farther to the west. The two Soviet commanders were confident they could capture these heights with relative ease.

6th Guards Corps was in the Army's second echelon behind the 82nd Rifle Corps on the left wing. Its mission was to capture Slobozia, cross the river, and take the German strongpoint at Copanca, 16km south of Tiraspol. While the right-wing 57th Rifle Corps struggled to take Tiraspol, the left wing made more spectacular progress. On April 10 the 195th and 20th Guards captured the eastern approaches to Slobozia, and the commander of the latter was ordered to complete seizing the town and prepare to make a crossing with two rifle regiments the following night. Meanwhile, the 10th Guards Airborne Division was to attack through the 195th, destroy a rearguard of 97th Jäger Division, and also stage a crossing. A cavalry reconnaissance platoon of 10th Airborne found the German 522nd Security Battalion manning fortified positions in a section of Slobozia. In a coordinated assault with 10th Airborne's 55th Rifle Regiment, the 195th shattered these defenses, captured the town by 0800 on April 11, and advanced to the east bank of the Dniester.

At the end of the day, after reaching the west bank, the forces of 6th Guards Corps were reinforced by elements of 82nd Corps to assault the German defenses on the heights northwest of Copanca. The combined attack pushed the 6th Guards Corps to the eastern shore of Lake Botna, situated on the Botna River. An assault by the entire 20th Guards Division against the defenses around Fantina-Maskui on the lake's south shore failed, largely due to the arrival of the German 3rd Mountain Division in the strong defenses on the high ground west of the lake and village.

During the fighting on April 12, Sen. Lt. Nikolai Grigorievich Sharikov, a battalion commander of the 573rd Rifle Regiment, distinguished himself sufficiently to become a Hero of the Soviet Union. Earlier, on March 29, during the Odesa Offensive, he prepared an assault over the Southern Buh, and included in it all the heavy machinegun crews of his battalion. Under his personal leadership and under heavy fire the assault group established a bridgehead, repelling several counterattacks in which the heavy machineguns played a vital role. Advancing toward the Dniester, on April 2 the battalion took the villages of Okorovka and Komtsy. German forces launched three counterattacks with tanks, but all of these were repulsed with heavy losses. On the night of April 6/7 the battalion was in the area of Cuciurgan when it faced another counterattack by infantry and armor. It was encircled, but Sharikov organized an effective defense, and then led a breakout, carrying out all the wounded and equipment. Finally, on April 12, he led his troops across the Dniester near Chițcani, secured an important height, and held it against counterattacks. On September 13 he was awarded his Gold Star. He continued a fine record of service for the duration and served in the postwar Soviet Army until 1960, when he held the rank of lieutenant colonel. He resided in Artyomovsk until his death on August 8, 1991.

Dissatisfied with Sharokhin's limited progress on April 12, Malinovskii ordered him to capture the "fortress" of Bender by the end of April 14. This effort involved the 57th and 82nd Corps, and ended in total failure. For several days heavy fighting also occurred in the southern part of the bridgehead as 82nd and 6th Guards Corps attempted to take the crucial heights. This struggle managed to expand the lodgement to roughly 15km wide and 15km deep, but by April 17 the German XXX Corps had managed to consolidate its hold with a total of four divisions. At this point a halt was called so Malinovskii could begin planning a decisive westward advance by bringing in his reserve 5th Shock and 6th Armies.

Meanwhile, Sharokhin renewed his assault on Bender overnight on April 18/19. In conjunction with this 6th Guards Corps was to hand over its sector to newly arriving forces of 6th Army. Subsequently the 195th and 20th Guards were to shift to new assembly areas around the villages of Merenești and Chițcani and prepare to support the main attack south of Bender. This regrouping was complicated by shortages of ammunition and Sharokhin was able to persuade Malinovskii to postpone the attack until 0200 hours on April 20. Attacking repeatedly between April 20 and 25, the Soviet forces made no progress whatsoever. 6th Army's 59th Guards Rifle Division, attacking on the 195th's former sector on April 25, made only minor gains before the fighting died out on April 29.

=== Second Jassy-Kishinev Offensive ===
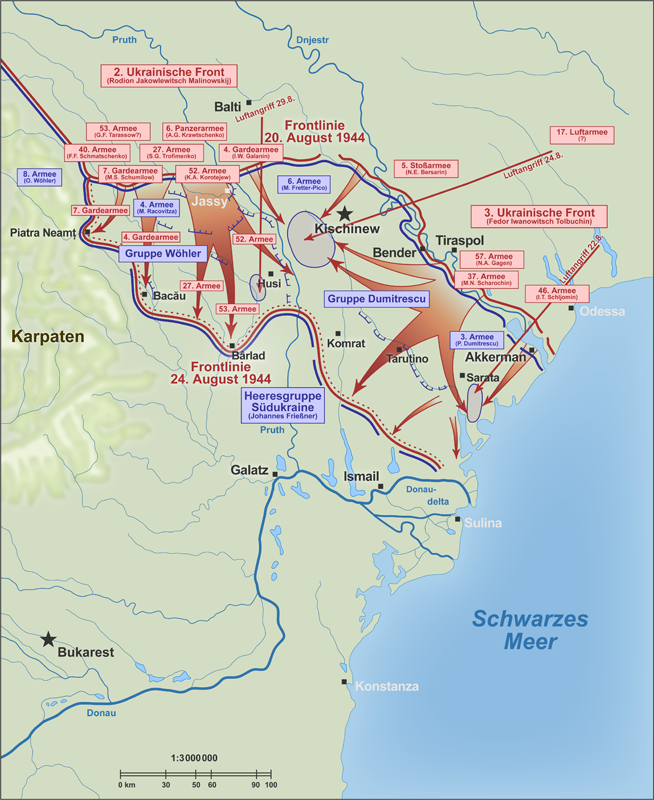
Map of Second Jassy-Kishinev Offensive (in German). Note position of 37th Army.

At the start of August the 6th Guards Corps consisted of the 10th Guards Airborne, 20th Guards, and 195th Divisions. During the new offensive, which began on August 20, 37th Army's immediate objective was to break through the heavily fortified German/Romanian defensive zone so the Army's mobile group, 7th Mechanized Corps, could be committed into a clean breach. The 6th Guards Corps had the two Guards divisions in first echelon with the 195th in second. The Corps was backed by a total of one artillery brigade, a mortar regiment, a cannon artillery regiment, an anti-tank brigade plus an additional regiment, a Guards Mortar regiment, a tank and a self-propelled artillery regiment, plus combat engineer elements. On the eve of the offensive the division's newspaper, "For the Motherland", printed a series of advisory articles with the titles: "The Power of the Antitank Rifle"; "The Grenade is Small, but Mighty"; "How to Determine the Distance to the Target"; and "Fight Like the Oath Commands You".

37th Army's offensive began with a reconnaissance-in-force by five penal companies, with significant artillery support, at 0500 hours. The main artillery preparation began at 0800, and continued for 105 minutes. As early as 1030 hours the defenders had lost the first and second trenches of their first defensive position. Along 6th Guards Corps' sector the 20th Guards, along with the 52nd Tank and 844th Self Propelled Artillery Regiments, crushed stubborn resistance and developed its success into the depth of the German defense. 10th Guards Airborne, despite initial progress, was unable to directly capture the strongpoint at Leontina; it was encircled and finally cleared by 1800. Before this, at 1400, the 195th moved up to a position 2km southwest of Copanca, ready to develop the success of the first echelon divisions.

For August 21, the 195th was assigned the task of capturing Yermokliya during the morning. The previous afternoon, 6th Army had committed its only operational reserve, 13th Panzer Division, to deploy its main forces to that place, manning a line from height 196.7 to Căușeni to Yermokliya. At first the 37th Army forces had no success, and in fact had to repel strong tank counterattacks. From 1100 hours, as these counterattacks died away, a powerful artillery attack was brought down on the German positions. At Yermokliya the 13th Panzer was supported by remnants of 4th Mountain and 306th Infantry Divisions. The first effort to take the strongpoint from the march was unsuccessful. The Corps commander, Maj. Gen. G. P. Kotov, devised a plan that called for his 10th Guards Airborne to make a pinning attack from the front while the 195th outflanked it from the southeast and 20th Guards did the same from the north with two regiments while its 55th Guards Rifle Regiment drove in from the west. Following a brief but powerful artillery preparation by 20 regiments against Yermokliya and the adjacent heights the Corps' forces went over to the attack, supported by tanks. As a result of the massive artillery strike, the skilful maneuver of units and the timely commitment of the 195th from second echelon, by 1100 Yermokliya was captured with its garrison encircled and destroyed. 13th Panzer suffered heavy losses, including roughly half of its personnel and was reduced to just 15 operational tanks. With the routed remnants of 306th Infantry it retreated to the southwest. Kotov received orders to pursue.

=== Pursuit to Romania ===
The pursuit began with the 195th and 20th Guards in the lead, while the 10th Guards Airborne moved on the Corps' left flank behind the 195th. The Corps' forward detachment was still reinforced by the two armored regiments. By the end of the day the Corps encountered strong resistance along the line height 199.9–Saitsi, mostly from German assault guns. The artillery of the Corps was lagging behind due to the occupation of the roads by the rear elements of 7th Mechanized Corps. Kotov brought up the 10th Guards Airborne after dusk to outflank Saitsi from the south, and the entire Corps went into an attack which cleared the village by 0100 hours on August 22. With the German line breached by 37th Army, in the evening of August 21 the STAVKA issued Order No. 00442, assigning a mission of "beating off the enemy rearguards, throwing them back to the north and, by the close of 22 August... [to] capture the Sălcuța–Taraclia–Kenbaran–Saka River area with the rifle formations." 6th Guards Corps was to develop the offensive in the general direction of Manzyr, and by the close of the day capture the line from Alekseevka to Cieara-Murzei.

During the afternoon the routed German units put up only weak resistance against 37th Army's advance, but this increased later as the German command frantically shifted reinforcements to try to cover the Chișinău axis. An attempt was made to organize a defense along the Chaga River, but this would ultimately fail, as the Soviet advance compromised this line. 6th Guards Corps encountered insignificant resistance on the Army's left flank and covered up to 45km, reaching the Skinosa and Cogâlnic Rivers. The 195th, having captured Kalachen, went on to cut the railway line west of that place.

During August 23, under threat of encirclement by 3rd and 2nd Ukrainian Fronts, the German Chișinău group of forces continued the withdrawal that had begun overnight. In this situation General Sharokin was assigned the mission of concentrating two rifle corps along his left flank, along with his main reinforcements, and continue an energetic pursuit to the northwest and west, aiming to reach the line Satu Nou–Grădiștea–the Yaplug River–Comrat by the day's end. Sharokin therefore directed 6th Guards Corps to reach a line from Zhavgur to Comrat with its main forces by the end of the day, while its forward detachment was to seize Leova. A linkup with 2nd Ukrainian Front along the Prut River was expected during the day. Recognition signals were agreed to so as to prevent "friendly" fire incidents. Through the day the 6th Guards, 82nd, and 7th Mechanized Corps conducted an energetic pursuit without being faced by any notable opposition. 6th Guards Corps easily broke through the Cogâlnic line in the morning, severely defeating the 163rd Ersatz Division, the 911th Assault Gun Brigade, and other specialized units. As during the previous day, the Corps artillery group advanced behind the 195th, which was again in second echelon. By nightfall it was approaching Comrat station and the heights to the southwest.

The priority for the Front commander, Army Gen. F. I. Tolbukhin, on August 24 was to complete the encirclement and destruction of the Chișinău grouping. General Sharokhin therefore gave the appropriate orders to 6th Guards Corps, which was to reach the Prut with its main forces by the end of the day, along a sector west of Tomai, Leova and Ginchesht. It was to seize crossings from off the march with its forward detachments and establish bridgeheads prior to forcing the river overnight near Fălciu. Throughout the day the main body of the German grouping (XXXXIV, LII and XXX Army Corps), which had reached the Kotovskoe area, attempted to break through to the southwest and west to the crossings over the Prut. All such efforts were stymied by the active defense of 82nd and 7th Mechanized Corps. Meanwhile, 6th Guards Corps began sweeping up scattered retreating groups, deployed in a single echelon. The 195th, on the right, was moving in the direction of Sărătenii, and by the end of the day had reached that place as well as Kugurlui. Near Huși the two Fronts had linked up, completing the encirclement.

The trapped German forces, having lost contact with 6th Army headquarters, were being led by Lt. Gen. G.-W. Postel, commander of XXX Corps. Tolbukhin tasked the 37th Army and 7th Mechanized Corps with repelling the main breakout attack while other forces split the pocket into pieces. 6th Guards Corps was to reach the line from Tekliya-Radyukani through Leova to Stoyanovka. Attacks from both sides began overnight and into August 25. The breakout force was organized into three columns: a central column of five infantry divisions, roughly 25,000 men, with 50 armored vehicles; a right column with the remnants of three divisions, about 5,000 men, and 10-15 armored vehicles; and a left column consisting of another three divisions, some 7,000 men, and 20 armored vehicles. Rearguards were holding off the 5th Shock and 57th Armies. Throughout the day the main weight of the attack fell on the 82nd and 64th Corps. Large groupings were successfully broken up, but some smaller groups managed, at the cost of heavy losses, to get across the Prut. 6th Guards Corps largely continued the previous day's mopping-up operation. The 195th advanced in the direction of Minjir and occasionally encountered stubborn resistance.

By the end of the day the division continued to battle the German force by individual regiments. The 564th Rifle Regiment was fighting from the southern outskirts of Novo-Knyazevka to height 139.9 to a position 1.5km south of Orak with its front facing northeast; the 573rd Regiment was repulsing attacks along the sector of the road junction 1.5km south of Orak to height 226.8 with its front facing north, and; the 604th Regiment was defending in the area of the woods west of height 226.8 to Voinescu. The Corps carried out its assigned task, and the 195th had reached the northern outskirts of Minjir. In the process, and in cooperation with the 13th Guards Mechanized Brigade, the division rounded up a German group of roughly the size of a regiment that had broken through to the Tomai area.

August 26 was effectively the last day of organized resistance by the German forces east of the Prut. 37th Army and 7th Mechanized were to act as the anvil while 5th Shock and 57th Armies were to hammer them westward. 6th Guards Corps was to securely hold the line Kugurlui–Voinescu, facing northeast. In the morning, a group of roughly divisional strength, with tanks, carried out a number of counterattacks from the Orak and Ceadîr areas in the direction of Minjir. At the same time the 20th Guards and the 195th began operating on the same axis, and were engaged in heavy fighting almost the entire day with superior forces. A threatening situation developed on the 195th's sector. This German grouping, which had broken through from Orak and pushed back the 64th Corps, at the cost of heavy casualties, and occupied Vozneseni. Continuing to move southwest it threatened the Corps' right flank. The division attempted to stabilize the situation and then, in conjunction with 20th Guards, attacked the group in the flank. As the result of this vigorous action, most of the grouping in Vozneseni was destroyed, while a small number managed to escape to the north. Colonel Shapkin reported more than 1,000 prisoners. The escape attempts became ever more frantic, and by the end of the day General Kotov's headquarters tallied up to 3,000 bodies of German officers and men on its front, while there was an additional 3,000 prisoners. Tolbukhin had presented an ultimatum to the encircled force, the answer to which was expected by 0900 hours on August 27.

During that day, seeing the hopelessness of their situation, the German troops began to surrender in the thousands. The fighting essentially ended by noon. A small part of the Chișinău grouping managed to get across the Prut before being destroyed by forces of 2nd Ukrainian Front. 6th Guards Corps combed the area north of Minjir for individuals and small groups. By the end of the day the 195th was in the Sărata-Răzeși area. On August 28 the 37th Army received a new assignment and began marching toward the Romanian-Bulgarian border, which it crossed on September 8, beginning the Bulgarian offensive.

== Into the Balkans and Postwar ==
Romania had already left the Axis with Germany on August 23/24, and would soon join the United Nations. Bulgaria, while a nominal member of the Axis as well, had not taken part in the fighting on the Soviet front and earlier in the month had re-established diplomatic relations with the USSR. On September 2 it declared a return to full neutrality, but the Soviet government declared war in spite of this three days later. After its border was crossed on the 8th, Bulgaria declared war on Germany. This was followed by general mobilization on September 22. Germany still had some 900,000 military personnel and hangers-on in Greece and Macedonia. Meanwhile, the left-flank forces of 3rd Ukrainian Front, including 37th Army, had slowed their advance through Bulgaria. By the last week of October the Soviet/Bulgarian forces were in Serbia, making strong bids to take Kraljevo and Skopje, but these were beaten off and the front stabilized.

At about this time the 195th was transferred to 66th Rifle Corps. It would remain under this command for the duration. At the end of the year the 37th became a separate army, not under any Front command, and served as a garrison unit in the Balkans until after the German surrender. The men and women of the division ended the war with the full title of 195th Rifle, Novomoskovsk, Order of the Red Banner Division. (Russian: 195-я стрелковая Новомосковская Краснознамённая дивизия.) As of June 10, 1945 the division, along with the rest of 37th Army, was part of the Southern Group of Forces, stationed in Bulgaria. It remained there until at least November, but afterwards was moved to the Odesa Military District with the remainder of 66th Corps, where it was disbanded on July 15, 1946.
