= Zhuravka, Bogucharsky District, Voronezh Oblast =

Zhuravka Журавка
- Selo
- Location within Voronezh Oblast Location within Russia
- Coordinates: 50°02′N 40°35′E
- Country: Russia
- Region: Voronezh Oblast
- District: Bogucharsky District
- Time zone: UTC+3:00

Zhuravka (Russian: Журавка) is a rural locality (a selo) in Podkolodnovskoye Rural Settlement, Bogucharsky District, Voronezh Oblast, Russia. The population was 552 as of 2010. There are 13 streets.

== Geography ==
Zhuravka is located on the left bank of the Don River, 18 km north of Boguchar (the district's administrative centre) by road. Kovylny is the nearest rural locality.
