= Travkino =

Travkino Травкино
- Selo
- Location within Voronezh Oblast Location within Russia
- Coordinates: 49°48′N 40°22′E
- Country: Russia
- Region: Voronezh Oblast
- District: Bogucharsky District
- Time zone: UTC+3:00

Travkino (Russian: Травкино) is a rural locality (a selo) in Radchenskoye Rural Settlement, Bogucharsky District, Voronezh Oblast, Russia. The population was 428 as of 2010. There are 4 streets.

== Geography ==
Travkino is located 28 km southwest of Boguchar (the district's administrative centre) by road. Radchenskoye is the nearest rural locality.
