= Batovka =

Batovka Батовка
- Khutor
- Location within Voronezh Oblast Location within Russia
- Coordinates: 49°35′N 40°32′E
- Country: Russia
- Region: Voronezh Oblast
- District: Bogucharsky District
- Time zone: UTC+3:00

Batovka (Russian: Батовка) is a rural locality (a khutor) in Pervomayskoye Rural Settlement, Bogucharsky District, Voronezh Oblast, Russia. The population was 139 as of 2010. There are 3 streets.

== Geography ==
Batovka is located 42 km south of Boguchar (the district's administrative centre) by road. Nagibin is the nearest rural locality.
