= Lofitskoye =

Lofitskoye Лофицкое
- Selo
- Location within Voronezh Oblast Location within Russia
- Coordinates: 49°54′N 40°27′E
- Country: Russia
- Region: Voronezh Oblast
- District: Bogucharsky District
- Time zone: UTC+3:00

Lofitskoye (Russian: Лофицкое) is a rural locality (a selo) and the administrative center of Popovskoye Rural Settlement, Bogucharsky District, Voronezh Oblast, Russia. The population was 748 as of 2010. There are 6 streets.

== Geography ==
Lofitskoye is located on the right bank of the Bogucharka River, 12 km southwest of Boguchar (the district's administrative centre) by road. Vervekovka is the nearest rural locality.
