= Podkolodnovka =

Podkolodnovka Подколодновка
- Selo
- Location within Voronezh Oblast Location within Russia
- Coordinates: 49°59′N 40°39′E
- Country: Russia
- Region: Voronezh Oblast
- District: Bogucharsky District
- Time zone: UTC+3:00

Podkolodnovka (Russian: Подколодновка) is a rural locality (a selo) and the administrative center of Podkolodnovskoye Rural Settlement, Bogucharsky District, Voronezh Oblast, Russia. The population was 1,582 as of 2010. There are 17 streets.

== Geography ==
Podkolodnovka is located on the left bank of the Don River, 11 km northeast of Boguchar (the district's administrative centre) by road. Galiyevka is the nearest rural locality.
