= Varvarovka, Bogucharsky District, Voronezh Oblast =

Varvarovka Варваровка
- Khutor
- Location within Voronezh Oblast Location within Russia
- Coordinates: 49°44′N 40°26′E
- Country: Russia
- Region: Voronezh Oblast
- District: Bogucharsky District
- Time zone: UTC+3:00

Varvarovka (Russian: Варваровка) is a rural locality (a khutor) in Lipchanskoye Rural Settlement, Bogucharsky District, Voronezh Oblast, Russia. The population was 519 as of 2010. There are 4 streets.

== Geography ==
Varvarovka is located 27 km southwest of Boguchar (the district's administrative centre) by road. Shurinovka is the nearest rural locality.
