= Vervekovka =

Vervekovka Вервековка
- Selo
- Location within Voronezh Oblast Location within Russia
- Coordinates: 49°55′N 40°27′E
- Country: Russia
- Region: Voronezh Oblast
- District: Bogucharsky District
- Time zone: UTC+3:00

Vervekovka (Russian: Вервековка) is a rural locality (a selo) in Popovskoye Rural Settlement, Bogucharsky District, Voronezh Oblast, Russia. The population was 499 as of 2010. There are two streets.

== Geography ==
Vervekovka is located 13 km (8.1 mi) west of Boguchar (the district's administrative centre) by road. Lofitskoye is the nearest rural locality.
