= Kupyanka =

Kupyanka Купянка
- Selo
- Location within Voronezh Oblast Location within Russia
- Coordinates: 49°53′N 40°32′E
- Country: Russia
- Region: Voronezh Oblast
- District: Bogucharsky District
- Time zone: UTC+3:00

Kupyanka (Russian: Купянка) is a rural locality (a selo) in Popovskoye Rural Settlement, Bogucharsky District, Voronezh Oblast, Russia. The population was 1,062 as of 2010. There are 9 streets.

== Geography ==
Kupyanka is located on the left bank of the Bogucharka River, 5 km south of Boguchar (the district's administrative centre) by road. Boguchar is the nearest rural locality.
