= Dubrava, Voronezh Oblast =

Dubrava Дубрава
- Settlement
- Location within Voronezh Oblast Location within Russia
- Coordinates: 49°50′N 40°46′E
- Country: Russia
- Region: Voronezh Oblast
- District: Bogucharsky District
- Time zone: UTC+3:00

Dubrava (Russian: Дубрава) is a rural locality (a settlement) and the administrative center of Medovskoye Rural Settlement, Bogucharsky District, Voronezh Oblast, Russia. The population was 445 as of 2010. There are 8 streets.

== Geography ==
Dubrava is located 24 km southeast of Boguchar (the district's administrative centre) by road. Monastyrshchina is the nearest rural locality.
