= Krasnodar, Voronezh Oblast =

Krasnodar Краснодар
- Khutor
- Location within Voronezh Oblast Location within Russia
- Coordinates: 49°53′N 40°14′E
- Country: Russia
- Region: Voronezh Oblast
- District: Bogucharsky District
- Time zone: UTC+3:00

Krasnodar (Russian: Краснодар) is a rural locality (a khutor) in Lugovskoye Rural Settlement, Bogucharsky District, Voronezh Oblast, Russia. The population was 128 as of 2010. There are 2 streets.

== Geography ==
Krasnodar is located 26 km west of Boguchar (the district's administrative centre) by road. Dantsevka is the nearest rural locality.
