= Pereshchepnoye, Bogucharsky District, Voronezh Oblast =

Pereshchepnoye Перещепное
- Selo
- Location within Voronezh Oblast Location within Russia
- Coordinates: 49°59′N 40°30′E
- Country: Russia
- Region: Voronezh Oblast
- District: Bogucharsky District
- Time zone: UTC+3:00

Pereshchepnoye (Russian: Перещепное) is a rural locality (a selo) in Filonovskoye Rural Settlement, Bogucharsky District, Voronezh Oblast, Russia. The population was 182 as of 2010. There are 5 streets.

== Geography ==
Pereshchepnoye is located 11 km north of Boguchar (the district's administrative centre) by road. Filonovo is the nearest rural locality.
