= Kravtsovo =

Kravtsovo Кравцово
- Khutor
- Location within Voronezh Oblast Location within Russia
- Coordinates: 49°38′N 40°34′E
- Country: Russia
- Region: Voronezh Oblast
- District: Bogucharsky District
- Time zone: UTC+3:00

Kravtsovo (Russian: Кравцово) is a rural locality (a khutor) in Radchenskoye Rural Settlement, Bogucharsky District, Voronezh Oblast, Russia. The population was 81 as of 2010. There are six streets.

== Geography ==
Kravtsovo is located 49 km south of Boguchar (the district's administrative centre) by road. Batovka is the nearest rural locality.
