= 351st Rifle Division =

- Active: 1941–1945
- Country: Soviet Union
- Branch: Red Army
- Type: Division
- Role: Infantry
- Engagements: Barvenkovo–Lozovaya Offensive Operation; Second Battle of Kharkov; Battle of the Caucasus; Kuban Bridgehead; Battle of Kiev (1943); Lvov–Sandomierz Offensive; Vistula-Oder Offensive; Prague Offensive
- Decorations: Order of the Red Banner 2nd Formation; Order of Suvorov 2nd Formation; Order of Bogdan Khmelnitsky 2nd Formation
- Battle honours: Shepetovka

Commanders
- Notable commanders: Col. Nikolai Ustinovich Gursky; Maj. Gen. Yemelyan Vasilevich Kozik; Maj. Gen. Ilya Fyodorovich Dudarev

The 351st Rifle Division first formed in September 1941, as a standard Red Army rifle division, at Stalingrad. It was assigned to the newly formed 57th Army in the same area shortly after forming, and remained in that Army for the duration of its existence. It helped to carve out the bridgehead north of Rostov known as the Izium Salient, but was encircled and destroyed during the Second Battle of Kharkov. A second 351st began forming in July 1942 in the North Caucasus, and went into combat in October, liberating the town of Alagir in January 1943. During the rest of that year and on into 1944 the division participated in the liberation of Ukraine under several Corps and Army headquarters and under command of a bewildering series of divisional commanders until Maj. Gen. I. F. Dudarev took command in April 1944, and held the post for just over a year. During its second formation the division compiled an enviable record of service and was recognized with several unit decorations and honors, but was disbanded shortly after the end of hostilities in Europe.

== 1st Formation ==
The division began forming in September 1941, in the North Caucasus Military District (Dunn states the division was formed in the Central Asia Military District) at Stalingrad. Its basic order of battle was as follows:

- 1157th Rifle Regiment
- 1159th Rifle Regiment
- 1161st Rifle Regiment
- 904th Artillery Regiment

The first recorded commander of the division was Col. Nikolai Ustinovich Gursky, but he was not appointed until April 1, 1942. He would lead this formation of the division until it was disbanded. The division's personnel included a large number of non-Russian nationality. In October, while still barely formed, the division was assigned to 57th Army, which was also just in the process of forming-up in the Reserve of the Supreme High Command, also in the Stalingrad area. In January 1942, the division and its Army moved to join Southern Front, taking part in the winter counter-offensive which led to the creation of the Izium salient south of Kharkov. In the course of this offensive, the 351st liberated the town of Barvenkovo, but the offensive became overextended and bogged down in the spring rasputitsa soon after.

=== Second Battle of Kharkov ===
When Southwestern Front launched its offensive on Kharkov on May 11, Southern Front's forces were not directly involved, but 57th Army was deep inside the Izium salient from which Southwestern Front was staging the southern prong of its attack. The Army was holding a front of 80km with four divisions, including the 351st, in the first line with 14th Guards Rifle Division in reserve. The divisions averaged a strength of 6,000 to 7,000 men. The 351st was on the Army's eastern (left) flank, linking to 9th Army and mostly facing the German 1st Mountain Division. Over the coming days Army Group South staged a buildup of forces south of the salient, and on May 17, 9th Army (due east of the division) came under attack from the German III Motorized and XXXXIV Army Corps.

On the first day of the German counteroffensive, 9th Army's front was deeply penetrated:

"Units on the right flank and in the center of Gen. Podlas's 57th Army remained in their positions, while at the boundary with 9th Army they turned their flanks to the north and, by the close of the day, they defended the line extending from Dobrovele through Malye Razdol to Novo-Prigozhaia. Withdrawn subunits of 9th Army's 341st Rifle Division defended the left flank of... 351st Rifle Division.

A breach 20km wide had been torn in the defenses between the two armies. The next day, Podlas was killed in action, and his army became leaderless during this crisis. Up to May 21 the division continued to hold most of its ground while being slowly driven backwards, but was not given explicit orders to retreat until the German forces completed its encirclement on that date. Over the following days the division was defending Krasnopavlovka, acting as a rearguard for the rest of the Army's remnants as they attempted to break out of the pocket. This duty gave little hope to escape themselves, and although the division held together well under such circumstances, it was destroyed by May 27, and was officially disbanded the same day.

== 2nd Formation ==
A new 351st Rifle Division began forming from July until August 9, 1942, at Ordzhonikidze in the North Caucasus Military District. Its basic order of battle remained the same as the first formation. Its initial commander was Col. I. G. Vinogradov, but he was replaced within a month by Maj. Gen. V. F. Sergatzkov, who would remain in command until January 14, 1943. For the duration of the war, the division was commanded by the following officers:

- Col. F. M. Bobrakov (January 15 - 22, 1943)
- Maj. Gen. A. M. Pykhtin (January 23 - 31, 1943)
- Col. F. M. Bobrakov (February 1 - 19, 1943)
- Col. K. P. Neverov (February 20 - March 12, 1943)
- Col. A. V. Vorozhishchev (March 13 - October 14, 1943)
- Lt. Col. Ya. I. Dyashkov (October 15, 1943 - January 30, 1944)
- Maj. Gen. Yemelyan Vasilevich Kozik (January 31 - March 14, 1944)
- Maj. Gen. N. M. Zamirovsky (March 18 - April 8, 1944)
- Maj. Gen. Ilya Fyodorovich Dudarev (April 9, 1944 - April 12, 1945)
- Col. Ya. I. Dyashkov (April 13 - April 23, 1945)
- Col. I. E. Vasilev (April 24 - May 11, 1945)

While still forming the division had to be moved south into the reserves of Transcaucasus Front since the German forces were approaching Ordzhonikidze.

=== Battle of the Caucasus ===
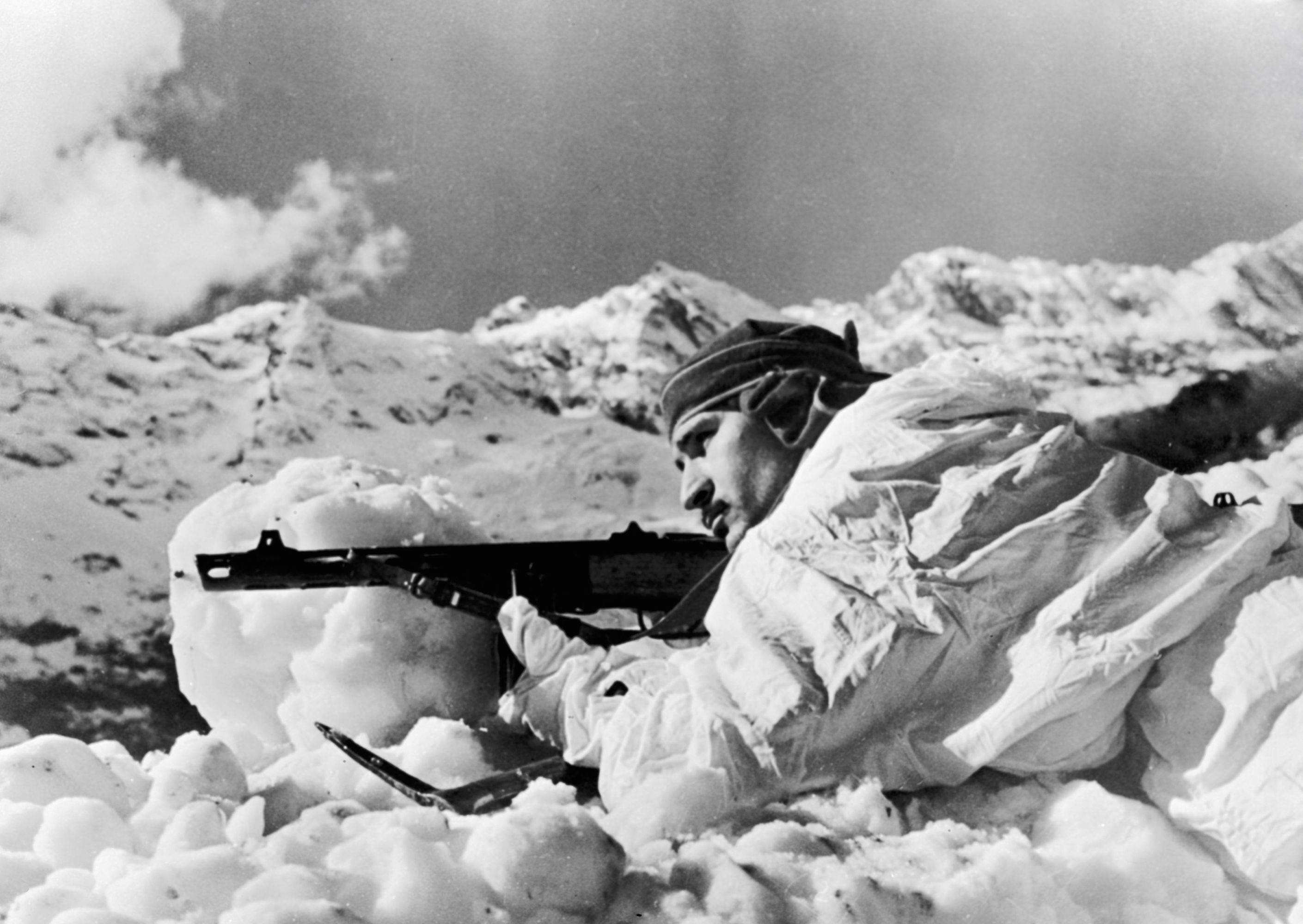
Deputy political officer of a company of submachine gunners of the division's 104th Separate Special Mountain Rifle Detachment Apollon Vladimirovich Palavandishvili in position in the Caucasus, 1942

The division was originally intended for the newly forming 66th Army, but due to the growing crisis in the Caucasus this plan was shelved. In mid-August, the German 17th Army began trying to force the passes through the High Caucasus mountains to reach the coast of the Black Sea. The division was assigned to 46th Army in the Black Sea Group of Forces with orders to organize a credible defense of the Ossetian Military Road and the pass it traverses. In the event, this pass was not contested. On September 23, Army Group A made another attempt to take the Black Sea port of Tuapse; at this time 46th Army was facing First Panzer Army's XXXIX Mountain Corps.

In October the 351st left 46th Army and was assigned to 12th Rifle Corps under direct command of the Front until December. In the first days of November, III Panzer Corps was struggling towards Ordzhonikidze, but on the 5th the city's defenders definitively halted 13th Panzer Division on the western and northwestern outskirts. A counterstroke was planned for November 7, the anniversary of the October Revolution, and the division, along with the 276th Rifle Division and 155th Rifle Brigade, was tasked to penetrate the southern wing of the panzer corps' defenses and link up with another assault group attacking from the north. These attacks went off piecemeal, which lessened their impact; despite this, 23rd Panzer Division was forced to withdraw and 13th Panzer was encircled near Gizel, northwest of Ordzhonikidze. Over the next days, Army Group A's overextended forces fought to rescue the beleaguered division, eventually linking up through a narrow corridor on November 11. Had the 351st acted more decisively the panzer troops might have been destroyed, but it held to its defensive positions in Mamisoisky Pass, just south of the escape route, protecting the Ossetian Military Road.

In December the division left 12th Corps and joined the 37th Army in the Northern Group of Forces in Transcaucasus Front, and on January 24, 1943, it liberated the town of Alagir. By the end of the month it was transferred to 58th Army in the North Caucasus Front, and after April it was moved to 9th Army of the same front, facing the German 17th Army in the Kuban bridgehead. After the Germans finally evacuated this last pocket in the Caucasus in September, the 351st went into the Reserve of the Supreme High Command, in the 1st Guards Army.

== Into Ukraine and Czechoslovakia ==
In November, the division was transferred, along with its Army, to 1st Ukrainian Front, and the following month moved to 60th Army in the same Front.

On February 11, 1944, the division was recognized for its role in the liberation of the western Ukrainian city of Shepetovka and received its name as a battle honor:

"SHEPETOVKA...351st Rifle Division (Maj. Gen. Kozik, Yemelyan Vasilevich)...By order of the Supreme High Command of 11 February 1944 and a commendation in Moscow, the troops who participated in the battles for the liberation of Shepetovka are given a salute of 12 artillery salvoes from 124 guns.

Kozik led the division until March 14, when he was replaced. He would later command the 327th Rifle Division. On March 19 the 351st was further honored with the award of the Order of the Red Banner for its part in the liberation of Starokostiantyniv and several nearby towns. In that same month the division was assigned to 11th Rifle Corps in 1st Tank Army, but in April that Corps was reassigned to 18th Army in the same Front. Within a few weeks it left that Corps and served under direct Army command through the early summer, until it was assigned the 95th Rifle Corps in July. It would remain under that command for the duration.

In August, 18th Army was moved to the re-deployed 4th Ukrainian Front; the 351st would remain in that Front for the duration. On December 16 the division received the Order of Suvorov, 2nd Class, for its part in the liberation of the Slovakian town of Humenné and the village of Michalok. In January 1945, 95th Corps became a separate corps under Front command, before being assigned to 38th Army in February. The Corps was reassigned once again in April, and the division ended its combat path back in 1st Guards Army, advancing on Prague.

== Postwar ==
The division completed its wartime service with the distinguished full title of 351st Rifle, Shepetovka, Order of the Red Banner, Order of Suvorov, Order of Bogdan Khmelnitsky Division. [Russian: 351-я стрелковая Шепетовская Краснознамённая орденов Суворова и Богдана Хмельницкого дивизия.] The division was disbanded in mid-1945 with the Northern Group of Forces.
