= Vishnyovy, Voronezh Oblast =

Vishnyovy Вишнёвый
- Settlement
- Location within Voronezh Oblast Location within Russia
- Coordinates: 49°58′N 40°23′E
- Country: Russia
- Region: Voronezh Oblast
- District: Bogucharsky District
- Time zone: UTC+3:00

Vishnyovy (Russian: Вишнёвый) is a rural locality (a settlement) in Tverdokhlebovskoye Rural Settlement, Bogucharsky District, Voronezh Oblast, Russia. The population was 330 as of 2010. There are 7 streets.

== Geography ==
Vishnyovy is located 230 km south of Voronezh, 20 km northwest of Boguchar (the district's administrative centre) by road. Tverdokhlebovka is the nearest rural locality.
