= Novonikolsk, Voronezh Oblast =

Novonikolsk Новоникольск
- Selo
- Location within Voronezh Oblast Location within Russia
- Coordinates: 49°37′N 40°23′E
- Country: Russia
- Region: Voronezh Oblast
- District: Bogucharsky District
- Time zone: UTC+3:00

Novonikolsk (Russian: Новоникольск) is a rural locality (a selo) in Pervomayskoye Rural Settlement, Bogucharsky District, Voronezh Oblast, Russia. The population was 103 as of 2010. There are 4 streets.

== Geography ==
Novonikolsk is located 49 km south of Boguchar (the district's administrative centre) by road. Lebedinka is the nearest rural locality.
