= Lugovoye, Voronezh Oblast =

Lugovoye Луговое
- Selo
- Location within Voronezh Oblast Location within Russia
- Coordinates: 49°54′N 40°19′E
- Country: Russia
- Region: Voronezh Oblast
- District: Bogucharsky District
- Time zone: UTC+3:00

Lugovoye (Russian: Луговое) is a rural locality (a selo) and the administrative center of Lugovskoye Rural Settlement, Bogucharsky District, Voronezh Oblast, Russia. The population was 841 as of 2010. There are 10 streets.

== Geography ==
Lugovoye is located on the Bogucharka River, 20 km west of Boguchar (the district's administrative centre) by road. Raskovka is the nearest rural locality.
