= Dubovikovo =

Dubovikovo Дубовиково
- Selo
- Location within Voronezh Oblast Location within Russia
- Coordinates: 50°00′N 40°18′E
- Country: Russia
- Region: Voronezh Oblast
- District: Bogucharsky District
- Time zone: UTC+3:00

Dubovikovo (Russian: Дубовиково) is a rural locality (a selo) in Tverdokhlebovskoye Rural Settlement, Bogucharsky District, Voronezh Oblast, Russia. The population was 59 as of 2010. There are 4 streets.

== Geography ==
Dubovikovo is located 30 km northwest of Boguchar (the district's administrative centre) by road. Orobinsky is the nearest rural locality.
