= Dantsevka =

Dantsevka Данцевка
- Selo
- Location within Voronezh Oblast Location within Russia
- Coordinates: 49°54′N 40°15′E
- Country: Russia
- Region: Voronezh Oblast
- District: Bogucharsky District
- Time zone: UTC+3:00

Dantsevka (Russian: Данцевка) is a rural locality (a selo) in Lugovskoye Rural Settlement, Bogucharsky District, Voronezh Oblast, Russia. The population was 554 as of 2010. There are 6 streets.

== Geography ==
Dantsevka is located 27 km west of Boguchar (the district's administrative centre) by road. Krasnodar is the nearest rural locality.
