= Popovka, Voronezh Oblast =

Popovka Поповка
- Selo
- Location within Voronezh Oblast Location within Russia
- Coordinates: 49°54′N 40°29′E
- Country: Russia
- Region: Voronezh Oblast
- District: Bogucharsky District
- Time zone: UTC+3:00

Popovka (Russian: Поповка) is a rural locality (a selo) in Popovskoye Rural Settlement, Bogucharsky District, Voronezh Oblast, Russia. The population was 399 as of 2010. There are 4 streets.

== Geography ==
Popovka is located on the right bank of the Bogucharka River, 9 km southwest of Boguchar (the district's administrative centre) by road. Vervekovka is the nearest rural locality.
