= Vasily Karuna =

Vasily Petrovich Karuna
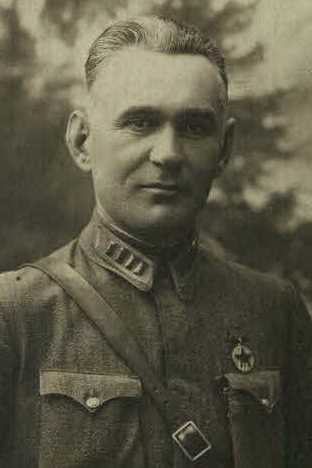
- Karuna, c. 1940
- Born: 27 April 1899; Morozovskaya, Don Host Oblast, Russian Empire
- Died: 30 September 1943 (aged 44) Dnepropetrovsk, Soviet Union
- Allegiance: Soviet Union
- Branch: Red Army
- Service years: 1917–1943
- Rank: General-mayor
- Commands: 113th Cavalry Division; 195th Rifle Division; 152nd Rifle Division
- Conflicts: Russian Civil War; Basmachi Rebellion; World War II; Invasion of Poland; Eastern Front (DOW)
- Awards: Order of the Red Banner; Order of Suvorov, 2nd class

Vasily Petrovich Karuna (Russian: Василий Петрович Каруна; 27 April 1899 – 30 September 1943) was a Red Army general-mayor who held division commands during World War II.

== Early life and Russian Civil War ==
Vasily Petrovich Karuna was born on 27 April 1899 in the stanitsa of Morozovskaya, and finished his education at a village school in 1911. During the Russian Civil War, he joined the Morozovskaya Red Guard Detachment in December 1917. With the detachment, he took part in battles against the Whites and the disarmament of the Cossacks returning from the front in the Nizhne-Chirskaya, Vasilyevskye mines, Tatsinskaya and Belaya Kalitva areas. In September 1918 Karuna's detachment was absorbed into the Red Army and he became a Red Army man in the 10th Morozovskaya Railroad Regiment. Later that year, Karuna transferred to serve as a machine gunner on the Lisitsa armored car. He took part in battles against the White Armed Forces of South Russia in the region of Morozovskaya and Tsaritsyn. Karuna was wounded in the leg at Tsaritsyn in September 1919 and hospitalized. After recovering, he served as an orderly in the 1st Morozovskaya Medical Train of the 10th Morozovskaya Regiment.

== Interwar period ==
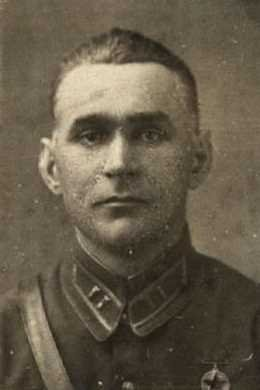
Karuna in the late 1930s

Karuna received command training at the 2nd Borisoglebsk-Petrograd Cavalry School in Petrograd between August 1920 and September 1923. While at the school, he took part in the suppression of the Kronstadt rebellion. On graduation, Karuna was appointed to command a machine gun platoon of the 61st Cavalry Regiment of the 8th Cavalry Division of the Turkestan Front. He took part in the suppression of the Basmachi movement in Eastern Bukhara, being credited with the destruction of the fighters led by Mustafakul in 1925, and was wounded in the fighting that year. For these actions, he was awarded a gilded saber by the Volga Military District Military Council in 1929.

After recovery, he returned to the regiment, where he was appointed chief of the regimental supply detachment. From May 1926 he served in the 43rd Cavalry Regiment of the 8th Cavalry Division, part of the Volga Military District at Orenburg, rising from machine gun platoon commander to acting machine gun squadron commander and acting saber squadron commander. In October 1927 he was transferred to the 47th Cavalry Regiment at Troitsk, serving as a squadron commander. After completing the Novocherkassk Cavalry Command Personnel Improvement Courses between October 1930 and June 1931, he returned to the 43rd Regiment of the 11th Cavalry Division (renumbered from the 8th), serving as assistant and acting regimental chief of staff, and assistant regimental commander for supply. In November 1935 the 11th Cavalry Division was relocated to the Belorussian Military District, stationed at Pukhovichi, and Karuna appointed regimental chief of staff. He was promoted to the rank of mayor (major) in 1937.

In October 1938 Karuna was transferred to the 4th Cossack Division of the 6th Cavalry Corps, commanding the 20th Cossack Regiment, soon renumbered as the 77th. He led the regiment in the September 1939 Soviet invasion of Poland, advancing into the territory annexed to the Soviet Union as western Belorussia. Being with the division forward detachment, on 23 September then-Major Karuna was tasked with cutting off and destroying Polish troops retreating through the Augustow Forest to the Lithuanian border. During encounters with Polish troops in the region of Kalita he was credited with "skillful and precise leadership of the regiment in combat, inspiring the personnel of the regiment with his heroism" in addition to the killing of up to 300 soldiers and capture of more than 500, together with 255 rifles, 200 grenades, five heavy machine guns, and 140 horses. Karuna was transferred to command the 128th Motor Rifle Regiment of the 29th Motorized Division of the Western Special Military District in July 1940, and received a promotion to the rank of polkovnik (colonel).

== World War II ==
After Germany invaded the Soviet Union, the 29th Motorized Division fought in defensive actions in the region of Grodno, Lida and Novogrudok as part of the 6th Mechanized Corps during the Battle of Białystok–Minsk. The division was encircled at the end of June, and at the end of July Colonel Karuna took temporary command of a regiment of the 108th Rifle Division of the Western Front. After being wounded, he was hospitalized on 7 August, then went on leave, and from 27 September to 22 November completed Higher Commanders' Improvement Courses at the Academy of the General Staff. Following the courses, Karuna was placed at the disposal of the Main Personnel Directorate and seconded to the Red Army Cavalry Inspectorate. In December he was appointed acting commander of the 113th Cavalry Division at Blagoveshchensk. In June 1942 Karuna was again placed at the disposal of the Cavalry Inspectorate, and on 12 August dispatched to the Voronezh Front for further assignment.

That same month, Karuna took command of the 195th Rifle Division, engaged in sustained offensive and defensive battles for Voronezh. In early October the division was withdrawn to the Reserve of the Supreme High Command and relocated to Balashov, where it was rebuilt. The division was assigned to the 4th Guards Rifle Corps of the 1st Guards Army of the Southwestern Front on 21 November and moved forward to the vicinity of Buturlinovka, Kalach and Vorobyovka. From 16 December the division went over to the offensive in Operation Little Saturn, forced a crossing of the Don, breaking through strongly fortified Italian-manned defenses and in six days advanced 120 kilometers, liberating about 40 settlements. Continuing to pursue the retreating Axis troops, the 195th reached the line of Bondarevka, Streltsovka, and Velikoutsk on 29 December, where it was stopped by the strong resistance of the German reserves, forcing it to go on the defense. In January 1943 Karuna's division fought as part of the 1st Guards Army in the Voroshilovgrad Offensive. For his leadership of the 195th in Operation Little Saturn, Karuna was awarded the Order of the Red Banner on 14 February 1943. The recommendation read:

During the operation to destroy the Italian Army in the region of the middle course of the Don, in December 1942, Comrade Karuna displayed a model of skillful leadership with units of the 195th Rifle Division in the destruction of the enemy. The tasks assigned by the command to the 195th Rifle Division were brilliantly fulfilled. The 195th Rifle Division, during the period from 16 to 22 December 1942, forced a crossing of the Don, broke through the strongly fortified zone of the enemy and inflicted a shattering blow on the enemy. During this period the 195th Rifle Division fought its way through more than 100 kilometers into the depths of territory occupied by the enemy. As a result of the battles, the 195th Rifle Division liberated more than 100 settlements. More than 1,600 men were captured, 32 depots with ammunition, provisions and quartermaster belongings were seized. Up to 30 enemy tanks were disabled and captured...For distinguished leadership in the fulfillment of combat objectives to destroy the enemy and for displaying in this courage and heroism, Colonel Karuna is deserving of the state award of the Order of the Banner.

Karuna was relieved of command on 13 March and in April appointed deputy commander of the 152nd Rifle Division, being granted command of the 152nd on 17 May. As part of the 34th Rifle Corps of the 6th Army, the 152nd took part in the Donbas strategic offensive, during which it liberated Zmiyev on 18 August. The division was transferred to the 1st Guards Army in August during the Donbass Offensive, and in September fought as part of the 34th and then the 6th Guards Rifle Corps. Karuna died of wounds on 30 September 1943.

== Awards ==
Karuna was a recipient of the following decorations:

- Order of the Red Banner
- Order of Suvorov, 2nd class
- Jubilee Medal "XX Years of the Workers' and Peasants' Red Army"
