= Poltavka, Voronezh Oblast =

Poltavka Полтавка
- Selo
- Location within Voronezh Oblast Location within Russia
- Coordinates: 49°52′N 40°33′E
- Country: Russia
- Region: Voronezh Oblast
- District: Bogucharsky District
- Time zone: UTC+3:00

Poltavka (Russian: Полтавка) is a rural locality (a selo) in Dyachenkovskoye Rural Settlement, Bogucharsky District, Voronezh Oblast, Russia. The population was 523 as of 2010. There are 4 streets.

== Geography ==
Poltavka is located 8 km south of Boguchar (the district's administrative centre) by road. Kupyanka is the nearest rural locality.
