= Abrosimovo, Voronezh Oblast =

Abrosimovo Абросимово
- Selo
- Location within Voronezh Oblast Location within Russia
- Coordinates: 49°53′N 40°53′E
- Country: Russia
- Region: Voronezh Oblast
- District: Bogucharsky District
- Time zone: UTC+3:00

Abrosimovo (Russian: Абросимово) is a rural locality (a selo) in Dyachenkovskoye Rural Settlement of Bogucharsky District, Voronezh Oblast, Russia. The population was 94 as of 2010. There are 2 streets.

== Geography ==
Abrosimovo is located 31 km southeast of Boguchar (the district's administrative centre) by road. Dedovka is the nearest rural locality.
