= Dyachenkovo =

Dyachenkovo Дьяченково
- Selo
- Location within Voronezh Oblast Location within Russia
- Coordinates: 49°54′N 40°36′E
- Country: Russia
- Region: Voronezh Oblast
- District: Bogucharsky District
- Time zone: UTC+3:00

Dyachenkovo (Russian: Дьяченково) is a rural locality (a selo) and the administrative center of Dyachenkovskoye Rural Settlement, Bogucharsky District, Voronezh Oblast, Russia. The population was 2,288 as of 2010. There are 22 streets.

== Geography ==
Dyachenkovo is located 8 km southeast of Boguchar (the district's administrative centre) by road. Kupyanka is the nearest rural locality.
