= 57th Army (Soviet Union) =

- 57-я армия
- Active: October 1941 – February 1943; April 1943 – 1947
- Country: Soviet Union
- Allegiance: Red Army
- Branch: Infantry
- Type: Combined arms
- Size: Field army
- Engagements: Barvenkovo–Lozovaya Offensive; Battle of Kharkov; Belgrade Offensive; Battle of the Transdanubian Hills; Vienna Offensive

The 57th Army (Russian: 57-я армия) was a field army of the Soviet Union's Red Army that was created in 1941, and then disbanded and created a second time in 1943. The 57th Army was employed by the Soviets in the fight against Germany during World War II.

== History ==
=== First formation ===
The 57th Army was formed in October 1941 and subordinated to the Reserve of the Supreme High Command (RVGK). Still under RVGK control in December 1941, the 57th Army was made up the 333rd, 335th, 337th, 341st, 349th and 351st Rifle Divisions, as well as the 60th and 70th Cavalry Divisions.

Starting on 1 January 1942, the 57th Army participated in the offensive by Southwestern Front against the lines of the German 6th Army and 17th Army. After the Soviet 6th Army had forced a breach around Izium at the gap of the two German armies' positions, 57th Army and the 6th Cavalry Corps were inserted into the new salient, capturing Barvinkove (Russian spelling: Barvenkovo) on 24 January and the important logistical strongpoint Lozova, including a German supply depot, on the 27th. The Germans reacted by 3 February with the transfer of XI Corps to the Pavlohrad sector, where it stood opposite 57th Army, which was now in the Barvenkovo Salient, bordered in the southeast by XLIV Corps, in the south by Gruppe Mackensen of III Panzer Corps, in the west by XI Corps, and in the north by Gruppe Dostler and by LI Army Corps.

During the May 1942 Battle of Kharkov, the army was surrounded and practically destroyed. Attempting to break out, General Podlas, the army commander, was killed in action. Slowly rebuilt, by December 1942, the army was part of the Stalingrad Front. The 57th Army was disbanded in February 1943 to form the headquarters of the 68th Army.

=== Second formation ===
The 57th Army was formed a second time in April 1943 and subordinated to the Southwestern Front. The 68th Rifle Corps first appears in Soviet OOB 1 August 1943, as part of the 57th Army, Southwestern Front. Subordinate divisions at this time were the 19th, 52nd, and 303rd Rifle Divisions. The army subsequently fought in Ukraine, Romania, Bulgaria, Yugoslavia, and Hungary until the end of the war. During the final months of the war, the army occupied the southernmost position of the Soviet front line; to the south of 57th Army on the eastern front were Bulgarian (including the Bulgarian First Army) and Yugoslavian forces. At war's end, the 57th Army was subordinated to the 3rd Ukrainian Front, and commanded the following forces.

Infantry units

6th Guards Rifle Corps

10th Guards Airborne Division
20th Guards Rifle Division
61st Guards Rifle Division

64th Rifle Corps

73rd Guards Rifle Division
113th Rifle Division
299th Rifle Division

133rd Rifle Corps

84th Rifle Division
104th Rifle Division
122nd Rifle Division

Artillery units

160th Gun-Artillery Brigade
42nd Guards Corps Artillery Regiment
374th Antitank Regiment
523rd Mortar Regiment
71st Anti-Aircraft Regiment

Engineer units

65th Engineer-Sapper Brigade

The 57th Army became part of the Southern Group of Forces when it was formed in June 1945. It was stationed in Romania with its headquarters at Craiova. On 10 June 1946 the 57th Army became the 9th Mechanized Army. It included the 19th Tank Division, 20th Mechanized Division, 24th Guards Mechanized Division, and the 6th Guards Rifle Corps. In December the 6th Guards Rifle Corps was disbanded, along with two of its divisions. In early 1947 the 19th Tank Division was moved back to the Soviet Union, where it was disbanded. On 15 July 1947 the army itself was disbanded, along with the 24th Guards and 20th Mechanized Divisions.

== Commanders ==
- 10.1941 - 02.1942 D. I. Riabyshev
- 02.1942 - 05.1942 K. P. Podlas
- 05.1942 - 06.1942 A. G. Batiunia
- 06.1942 - 07.1942 Dmitry Nikishov
- 07.1942 - 01.1943 F. I. Tolbukhin
- 04.1943 - 05.1943 Pavel Rybalko
- 05.1943 - 10.1944 Nikolai Gagen
- 10.1944 - 05.1945 Mikhail Sharokhin
- 06.1946 - 02.1947 Colonel General Issa Pliyev
- 02.1947 - 07.1947 Colonel General Nikolai Gusev
