= Mikhail Mikeladze =

Soviet Army major general

Mikhail Gerasimovich Mikeladze
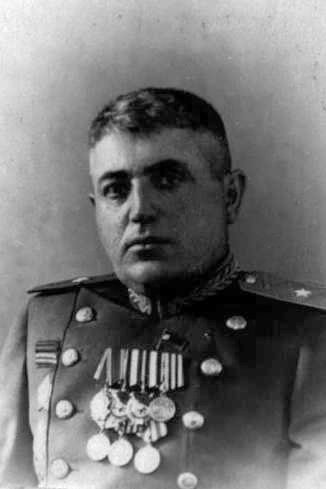
- Mikeladze, postwar
- Born: 22 October 1899; Kilda, Tiflis Governorate, Russian Empire
- Died: 5 July 1975 (aged 75) Tbilisi, Soviet Union
- Allegiance: Russian Empire; Georgia; Soviet Union
- Branch: Imperial Russian Army; Army of Georgia; Red Army (Soviet Army from 1946)
- Service years: 1915–1918; 1919–1921; 1921–1955
- Rank: Major general
- Commands: 195th Rifle Division; 7th Guards Airborne Division; 10th Guards Airborne Division; 13th Rifle Corps; 414th Rifle Division
- Conflicts: World War I; Russian Civil War; World War II
- Awards: Order of Lenin

Mikhail Gerasimovich Mikeladze (Russian: Михаил Герасимович Микеладзе, Georgian: მიხეილ გერასიმეს ძე მიქელაძე; 22 October 1899 – 5 July 1975) was a Soviet Army major general of Georgian ethnicity who held divisional and corps command in World War II.

Conscripted into the Imperial Russian Army during World War I, Mikeladze became a junior officer. Wounded while fighting on the Western Front, he was taken prisoner by Ottoman troops during the Caucasus campaign. Released from captivity, he served in the army of the Democratic Republic of Georgia. Joining the Red Army after the Soviet invasion of Georgia, Mikeladze rose through command and staff positions and was an instructor at the Frunze Military Academy when Germany invaded the Soviet Union. Wounded while commanding the 195th Rifle Division in the defense of Voronezh in mid-1942, Mikeladze served as an army chief of staff in the Battle of the Caucasus. He commanded the 7th Guards Airborne Division in late 1943 and the 10th Guards Airborne Division in early 1944. After being wounded in the latter position, Mikeladze commanded a corps on the Turkish border for the rest of the war. He continued to serve in the army until the mid-1950s.

== Early life and World War I ==
A Georgian, Mikhail Gerasimovich Mikeladze was born on 22 October 1899 in the village of Kilda, Akhalkalaksky Uyezd, Tiflis Governorate. He worked as a loader and counter in the office of the freight station in Aleksandropol. During World War I, he was mobilized in December 1915 for construction work in a labor battalion at the Aleksandropol fortress during the Ottoman advance, then transferred to the 22nd Reserve Rifle Regiment stationed at the fortress. In May 1916 he was sent from the regimental training detachment to the 1st Tiflis School for Praporshchiks for junior officer training. Graduating from an accelerated course there in August of that year, Mikeladze received the rank of praporshchik and was appointed commander of a platoon in the 16th Reserve Infantry Regiment of the Kazan Military District at Alatyr.

In late September, he was sent to the Western Front with a march company. He fought as a rifle company junior officer near Baranovichi with the 8th Moscow Grenadier Regiment of the 2nd Grenadier Division. Mikeladze was twice wounded in January 1917 and sent to a hospital in Moscow for treatment, returning to his regiment in March. He was transferred to the Caucasus Army in July 1917 and in early August appointed a junior officer in the 2nd Rifle Regiment of newly formed 1st Caucasian Rifle Division at Aleksandropol fortress. The regiment was transferred to the Kars fortress in November, and in December it abandoned the fortress with retreating units and returned to Aleksandropol. Mikeladze served with the regiment until March 1918, reaching the rank of podporuchik.

Mikeladze was wounded in action in the region of Dzhalal-ogly in April 1918 and captured by Ottoman troops. He was sent to Erzerum as a prisoner of war, and spent eight months in captivity. Returning to Tiflis, Mikeladze was mobilized into the army of the Democratic Republic of Georgia in February 1919 and appointed commander of a half-company and junior lieutenant in the 12th Rifle Regiment at Poti. A month later his battalion was relocated to Manglisi, and then to Ardahan on the Turkish border that summer. He served at Ardahan as commander of a half-company until the Soviet invasion of Georgia in February 1921.

== Interwar period ==
Mikeladze joined the Red Army in March 1921 and was appointed commander of the guard company of the Senaki uyezd military commissariat. In April he was transferred to command the guard company of the Kutaisi Governorate military commissariat. Mikeladze served as a commander in the 2nd Poti District Vsevobuch at Poti from May. In August he was posted to an operational unit as a company commander and chief of the training detachment of the 3rd Georgian Rifle Regiment of the 1st Caucasian Rifle Division of the Separate Caucasus Army. Mikeladze was transferred in November to serve as a company commander in the 1st Georgian Rifle Regiment of the division. He took part in the suppression of the Khevsureti uprising that year. Mikeladze completed the recurring command courses of the Separate Caucasus Army between December 1922 and April 1923. Returning to the division, he continued to serve as a company commander in the 1st Georgian Rifle Regiment, rising to command a battalion of the 2nd Georgian Rifle Regiment in October 1926 and to chief of the 1st (operations) section of the division staff in November 1930.

Mikeladze was admitted to the Frunze Military Academy in April 1932. Upon graduation in May 1936 he was appointed chief of staff of the 2nd Caucasian Rifle Division, renamed the 60th Caucasian Rifle Division after its relocation to Ovruch in the Ukrainian Military District. In December of that year Mikeladze was transferred back to the Transcaucasus Military District as chief of staff of the 63rd Georgian Rifle Division at Tbilisi. He was appointed chief of staff of the 29th Rifle Division of the Belorussian Military District in June 1938. Mikeladze became chief of staff of the 14th Rifle Corps at Vyazma in 1939, and on 14 August of that year was transferred to the Frunze Military Academy as a tactics instructor. In April 1941 he rose to senior instructor of the staff service department at the academy.

== World War II ==
After Germany invaded the Soviet Union, Mikeladze, by then a colonel, was placed at the disposal of Stavka as an officer for special assignments. He took part in the defense of the cities of Bryansk, Moscow, Kursk, Belgorod, and Kharkov. From January 1942 he served as a Glavupraform representative to formations, and from April was a Glavupraform representative for formation of units in military districts.

On 17 June, Mikeladze was appointed commander of the 195th Rifle Division. He arrived to take command of the division on 7 July as it was being sent to the front. Mikeladze led the division in the Voronezh–Voroshilovgrad strategic defensive operation, during which it defended Voronezh. He was wounded while on the frontline supervising the advance of a regiment of his division on 19 July. Evacuated to a hospital, Mikeladze returned to command the division ten days later before finishing treatment. As the battle for Voronezh continued, Mikeladze was recalled by Stavka on 18 August. Placed at the disposal of Lavrenty Beria, Mikeladze departed with him for Tbilisi on 19 August. He took part in the Battle of the Caucasus as Beria's representative to the 46th Army, and on 27 August was named one of the two deputy commanders of the 46th Army. Mikeladze was recommended for the Order of the Red Banner on 15 September for his performance in this role during fighting to retake mountain passes in the Main Caucasian Range and was awarded this decoration on 13 December. The recommendation read:

Colonel Comrade Mikeladze acting together with the group of forces led by Colonel Comrade Piyashev, thanks to his energetic and correct actions in difficult combat conditions organized the offensive of flanking columns on the Gudauta pass and captured it. Further, through across a lake to the Anuchkha pass, he secured its seizure from the north with his group of forces, surrounding the enemy and taking the settlement of Pskhu, after which Colonel Comrade Mikeladze organized and developed the offensive further to the passes of Chmakhara and Adzapsh.

For the actions displayed by Colonel Comrade Mikeladze, he is deserving of the Order of the Red Banner.

Mikeladze served as army chief of staff from October while it defended the Main Caucasian Range. He was promoted to the rank of major general on 14 October. After the German retreat from the North Caucasus in March 1943 the army was withdrawn to the reserve, and in May Mikeladze was appointed deputy commander of the 21st Guards Rifle Corps of the Steppe Military District.

A month later he took command of the 7th Guards Airborne Division, which fought as part of the Steppe Front from 9 July. Mikeladze was treated in a hospital from late August to 16 October, then returned to command the division. He was transferred to command the 10th Guards Airborne Division of the 2nd Ukrainian Front on 15 December. He led the division in the fighting on the approaches to Krivoy Rog during the Nikopol–Krivoy Rog Offensive in February. For his performance in the offensive, Mikeladze was recommended for the Order of Suvorov, 2nd class, on 28 February, which he was awarded on 19 March. The recommendation read:

Guards Major General Mikeladze, commanding the division, showed himself to be a tactical versatile, energetic general.

In the offensive battles for the breakthrough of the strongly fortified enemy defense in the region northeast of Krivoy Rog, the division in four days of combat operations broke through the defense and developing the offensive, joined battle to take the city of Krivoy Rog. As a result of his skillful leadership of the battle, the division guaranteed the seizure of the city and on 22 February 1944 the city of Krivoy Rog was taken.

In bitter fighting with enemy infantry and tanks, thanks to the skillful leadership of Major General Mikeladze, the division inflicted a strong blow on the enemy, during which it destroyed 19 enemy tanks and exterminated up to 2,400 German soldiers and officers.

For its conduct of the battle to break through the strongly fortified enemy defense northeast of Krivoy Rog, the division was recommended for the Order of the Red Banner and for the taking of the city of Krivoy Rog received the Krivoy Rog designation.

For his excellent carrying out of the orders to break through the strongly fortified enemy defense zone in the region northeast of Krivoy Rog and the taking of the city of Krivoy Rog, I recommend Major General Mikeladze for the Order of Suvorov, 2nd class.

During the Odessa Offensive that began on 26 March, the division took part in fighting for Razdelnaya, in which Mikeladze was wounded again on 5 April. Evacuated to a hospital, he was awarded the Order of Bogdan Khmelnitsky, 2nd class on 3 June, for his command performance. The recommendation read:

The 10th Guards Krivoy Rog Red Banner Airborne Division, liberating Soviet Ukraine from the German invaders, fought from Kharkov to Tiraspol, forcing major rivers: the Dnieper, Southern Bug, and Dniester.

For its merits in battle for the Homeland, the division was conferred the Krivoy Rog title and awarded the Order of the Red Banner. Under the command of Major General M. G. Mikeladze, the division liberated the mines of Krivoy Rog, forced the Southern Bug and in the April battles of 1944 took the town and major rail junction of Razdelnaya by storm, for which it was commended by Supreme High Commander Marshal of the Soviet Union Comrade Stalin and received a state award.

In the period he commanded the division, Major General M. G. Mikeladze showed himself to be a courageous and strong-willed commander, able to fulfill combat objectives set by the command. In battles for Razdelnaya, directly leading with battle orders, he was wounded and evacuated for hospital treatment.

For his exemplary fulfillment of command orders, for skillful command of a formation and displaying personal heroism in the battles for the liberation of Soviet Ukraine he is deserving of a state award, the Order of Bogdan Khmelnitsky, 2nd class.

After recovering, Mikeladze was appointed commander of the 13th Rifle Corps of the Transcaucasus Front in October, spending the rest of the war covering the Soviet–Turkish border and the Black Sea coast.

== Postwar ==
After the end of the war, Mikeladze commanded the corps until he was moved up to deputy commander of the 18th Army on 11 December. In June 1946 he took command of the 414th Rifle Division, then from March 1947 served as deputy chief of the rear of the Transcaucasus Military District. In May 1953 he was appointed chief of the military department of the Georgia Polytechnic Institute. He was transferred to the reserve on 13 December 1955, and died on 5 July 1975 in Tbilisi.

== Awards ==
Mikeladze was a recipient of the following awards:

- Order of Lenin
- Order of the Red Banner (3)
- Order of Suvorov, 2nd class
- Order of Bogdan Khmelnitsky, 2nd class
