= 10th Guards Airborne Division =

10th Guards Airborne Division (8 Dec 1942 – 20 Dec 1945) 126th Guards Rifle Division (1945 – 1946)
- Active: 1942–1946
- Country: Soviet Union
- Branch: Airborne, Infantry
- Size: Division
- Engagements: World War II; Battle of the Dnieper; Dnieper–Carpathian Offensive; Second Jassy–Kishinev Offensive
- Decorations: Order of the Red Banner; Order of Suvorov
- Battle honours: Krivoi Rog

The 10th Guards Airborne Division (Russian: 10-я гвардейская воздушно-десантная дивизия) was an infantry division of the Red Army from 1942 to 1946.

Postwar, the division was reorganized as the 126th Guards Rifle Division at the end of 1945, and was disbanded in late 1946.

== History ==
The 10th Guards Airborne Division was formed on 8 December 1942 from the 3rd and 4th Maneuver Airborne Brigades at Dmitrov in the Moscow Military District. Until 5 February 1943, the division conducted training. The 10th Guards Airborne Division became part of the 68th Army. The division took up positions on the Lovat River. On 22 July, the division was withdrawn from the line in preparation for battles south of Staraya Russa. On 17 August, the division was in its positions. The 18th Army started the offensive. The 10th Guards Airborne was in reserve and was to expand gains made by the 1st Guards Airborne Division and 26th Rifle Division. The 19th Guards Airborne Regiment temporarily captured Derekovo while the 24th Guards Airborne Regiment attacked Chirikov. On 19 August, the division again attempted to capture Derekovo and Chrikov, but failed. After reinforcement, the division tried again on 22 August, but attacks stalled against fierce resistance. On 26 August, the division withdrew and concentrated at Parfino.

On 6 September, the division arrived at Kharkov, where it became part of the 82nd Rifle Corps of the 37th Army. On 1 October, the division crossed the Dnieper. The 30th Guards Airborne Regiment captured the village of Mishurin Rog. The division fought battles to hold its bridgehead until 14 October. On 16 October, the division attacked in the direction of Krivoi Rog, which it captured. On 26 February 1944, the 10th Guards Airborne was awarded the title 'Krivoi Rog' for its successful capture of the city.

The division crossed the Inhulets River at Inhul-Radionovka on 27 February. Between 13 and 14 March, the division pursued German troops in the direction of Kazanka on the Southern Bug. On 16 March, the division led the offensive in the direction of Voznesensk. The division captured Yelanets on 18 March and Voznesensk on 23 March. Crossing the Southern Bug, the division continued to advance, capturing Kotovsk, Bogunskiy and Oskarovku. On 4 April, during the Odessa Offensive, the division captured Rozdilna. For its performance during the offensive, the division was awarded the Order of the Red Banner.

The division reached the Dniester on 11 April in the area of Caragaș. It crossed the river on the next day and fought to hold its bridgehead until 18 April. From 18 to 26 April, the division was transferred to Tiraspol, where it was replenished. On 27 April, it went back into combat around Varnița, fighting to hold another bridgehead. On 8 May, it was withdrawn from combat again.

On 2 June, the division was concentrated near Caragas, where it conducted training until 15 August. On 20 August, the division, as part of the 37th Army fought in the Second Jassy–Kishinev Offensive. In the offensive, the division captured Comrat, Basarabeasca and Leova. The division surrounded and eliminated a large group of enemy soldiers. Between 28 August and 6 September, the division mopped up German survivors on the Prut, taking 4,000 prisoner. On 10 September, the division crossed the Danube and entered Romanian territory. On 28 September, the division was awarded the Order of Suvorov 2nd class for its actions during the Second Jassy–Kishinev Offensive.

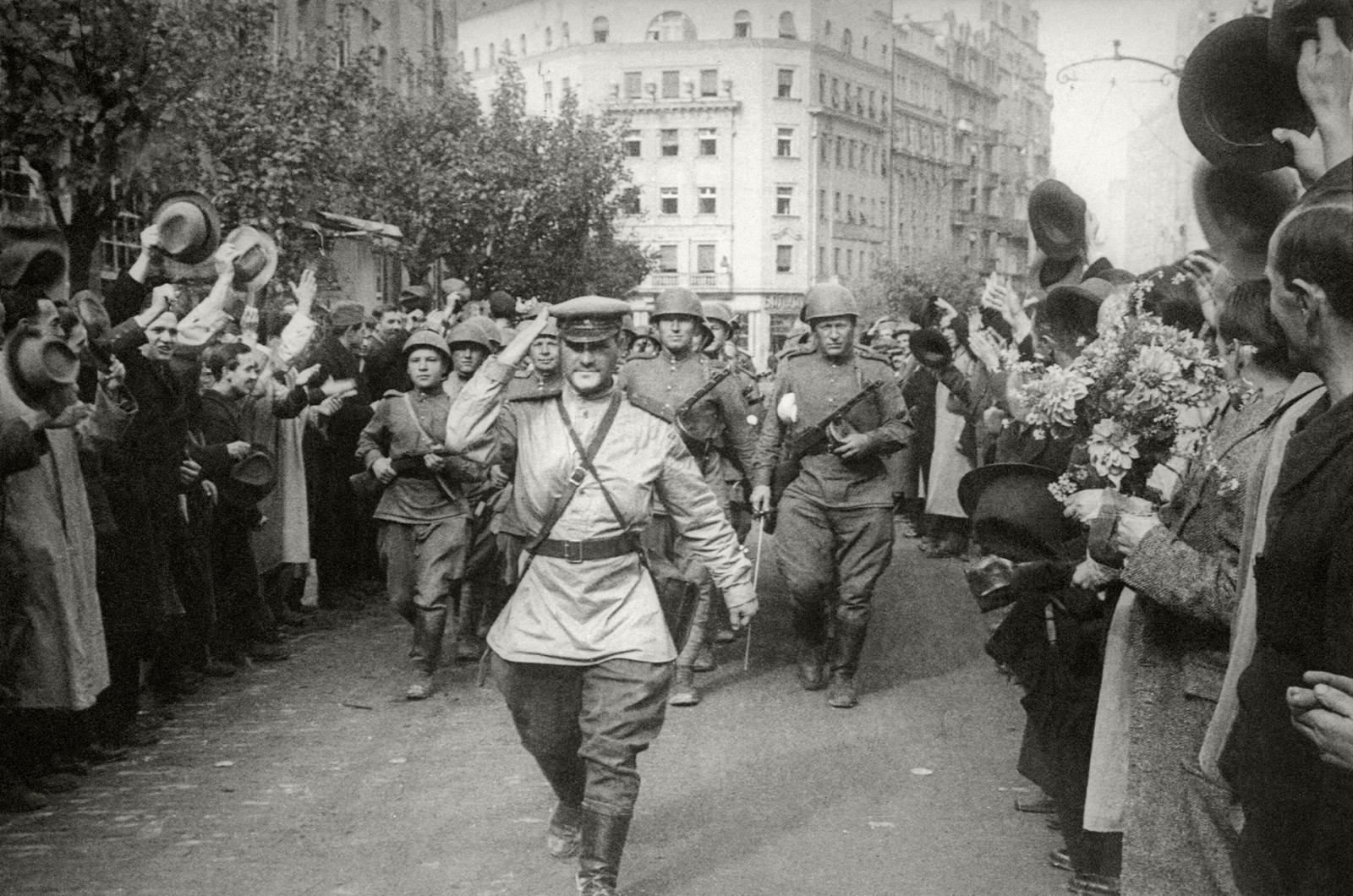
Residents of Belgrade greeting soldiers of the Signal Company of the division's 30th Guards Airborne Rifle Regiment, led by company commander Senior Lieutenant Dmitry Ivanovich Kudashev, 30 October 1944

Advancing southwards, the division entered Bulgarian territory at Serdement and advanced through Dobrych, Pereslav and Sliven. On 29 September the division was in the village of Golubnitsy, where it stayed until 30 October. On 4 November, the 10th Guards Airborne began a march to Belgrade, where it arrived on 9 November. On 18 November, it was in Sambir, where it became part of the 57th Army's 6th Guards Rifle Corps. On 23 November, the division crossed the Danube near Botin. By 25 November, it was advancing along the line of Dushevitsa and Knyajevo, breaking through German defences. The division captured the city of Koposhvar on 2 December. On 5 December, the division advanced to Nadbayom, where it went on the defensive. Between 14 December and 6 January 1945, the division fought German counterattacks in order to hold its gains. On 6 January, the 19th and 24th Guards Airborne Regiments were awarded the Order of Kutuzov 3rd class for their actions in the crossing of the Danube.

On the same day, the division replaced the 73rd Rifle Division in another position, which it defended until 25 March. After repulsing German counterattacks, the division went on the offensive on 29 March. Breaking through German defences, the division pursued the German troops into Austria. On 4 April, the division was on the Hungarian-Yugoslav border at Križevci. On 7 April, it entered Austrian territory and was in the area of Feringa on the next day. On 19 April, it took positions in Raabau, which it held to 8 May. On 9 May, the division entered Graz, where it ended the war. In June and July, the division marched back through Alba Iulia, Tulcea to the Soviet Union, where it became the 126th Guards Rifle Division on 20 December. It was part of the 6th Guards Rifle Corps of the 57th Army in the Southern Group of Forces. It was stationed in Buda. After briefly becoming part of 9th Mechanised Army (after 57th Army was reorganised within the Southern Group of Forces, the division was disbanded on 30 November 1946.

== Commanders ==
- Major General Vasily Polikarpovich Ivanov (8 December 1942 – 23 December 1943)
- Major General Mikhail Mikeladze (24 January–5 April 1944)
- Colonel Andrey Petrushin (9 April 1944–10 February 1946)
- Major General Andrey Prituzov (12 May–12 October 1946)
- Major General Vasily Leshchinin (12 October–3 November 1946)
- Colonel Pyotr Tatarchevsky (3 November–1 December 1946)

== Composition ==
The following units were part of the 10th Guards Airborne Division on 29 December 1942:

- 19th Guards Order of Kutuzov Airborne Regiment
- 24th Guards Order of Kutuzov Airborne Regiment
- 30th Guards Airborne Regiment
- 5th Guards Airborne Artillery Regiment
- 9th Guards Airborne Separate Destroyer Anti-Tank Battalion
- 2nd Guards Airborne Signals Company
- 1st Guards Airborne Sapper Battalion
- 11th Guards Airborne Separate Reconnaissance Company
- 3rd Guards Airborne Medical-Sanitary Battalion
- 12th Guards Airborne Separate Auto Transport Company
- 7th Guards Airborne Divisional Veterinary Field Hospital
- 4th Guards Airborne Field Bakery
