= 6th Guards Rifle Corps =

Soviet rifle corps in World War II

The 6th Guards Danube Rifle Corps was a rifle corps of the Red Army during World War II. During the war, it formed part of the 8th, 2nd Shock, 1st Guards, 46th, 37th, and 57th Armies.

== History ==
The corps headquarters was formed on 16 March 1942 in Malaya Vishera for the continuation of the offensive during the Battle of Lyuban. Initially, the corps included one rifle division and one airborne brigade, in addition to the 42nd Guards Corps Artillery Regiment, which supported the corps for almost the rest of the war.

The corps was part of the 'operational army' from 28 March to 13 October 1942, and 5 November 1942 to 9 May 1945.

During the fighting in Volkhov, the corps did not see combat. In the summer, in anticipation of the Sinyavino offensive, the corps received new units and relocated slightly to the north. In September 1942 the Corps was involved in the Sinyavino offensive. The Corps was put into action as part of the offensive on 27 August 1942. The offensive of the corps initially found success, as it crossed the Chyornaya river and broke through the first line of German defenses at the junction of the 227th and 223rd Infantry Divisions. In two days the corps reached the approaches to Sinyavino. Subsequently, the 3rd Guards Rifle Division launched an attack on Workers Settlement No. 5, the 24th Guards Rifle Division advanced on Lake Sinyavinskaya, and the 19th Guards Rifle Division directly attacked Sinyavino. The corps was unsuccessful in making any further advance, soon was surrounded, and suffered heavy losses. The corps began withdrawing from the positions it reached near Sinyavino on 27 September. In October, the corps headquarters was transferred to the Reserve of the Supreme High Command (Stavka Reserve).

On 23 October, the corps was assigned new units: the 38th and 44th Guards and 266th Rifle Divisions. At the end of November the corps was relocated to the area of Verkhny Mamon. From December the corps went on the offensive in the Middle Don offensive from the Osetrovo bridgehead on the Don and secured the breakthrough for tanks of the 18th Tank Corps, after which it developed the offensive, following the tanks towards Millerovo. The troops of the corps liberated Boguchar on 19 December, and on the same day the tanks reached the town of Meshkov. On the next day the corps deployed near Millerovo and on 26 December it entered the battle for the city, which continued until the liberation of that city on 17 January. After the liberation of Millerovo, the corps deployed to the west and began fighting its way towards the Seversky Donets.

Postwar, the 6th Guards Rifle Corps was moved to Romania along with the 57th Army. The 20th Guards Rifle Division became the 25th Guards Mechanized Division and was stationed at Giurgiu. The 61st Guards Rifle Division was stationed at Brănești. The 10th Guards Airborne Division became the 126th Guards Rifle Division and was stationed at Buda. In December 1946, the corps was disbanded, along with the 61st and 126th Guards Rifle Divisions.

== Commanders ==
- Major General Ivan Korovnikov (16 March–21 April 1942)
- Colonel Sergey Roginsky (22 April–5 June 1942; promoted to Major General 13 May 1942)
- Major General Sergey Biyakov (6 June–6 October 1942)
- Colonel Ivan Alfyorov (7 October 1942–30 December 1943; promoted to major general 31 December 1942)
- Major General Grigory Kotov (31 December 1943–killed 7 November 1944; promoted to lieutenant general 13 September 1944)
- Colonel Mikhail Zaychikov (8–20 November 1944)
- Lieutenant General Stepan Morozov (21 November 1944–19 March 1945)
- Lieutenant General Nikolay Dreyer (20 March 1945–11 June 1946)
- Lieutenant General Fyodor Zakharov (June–December 1946)
