= Voinescu =

- Village
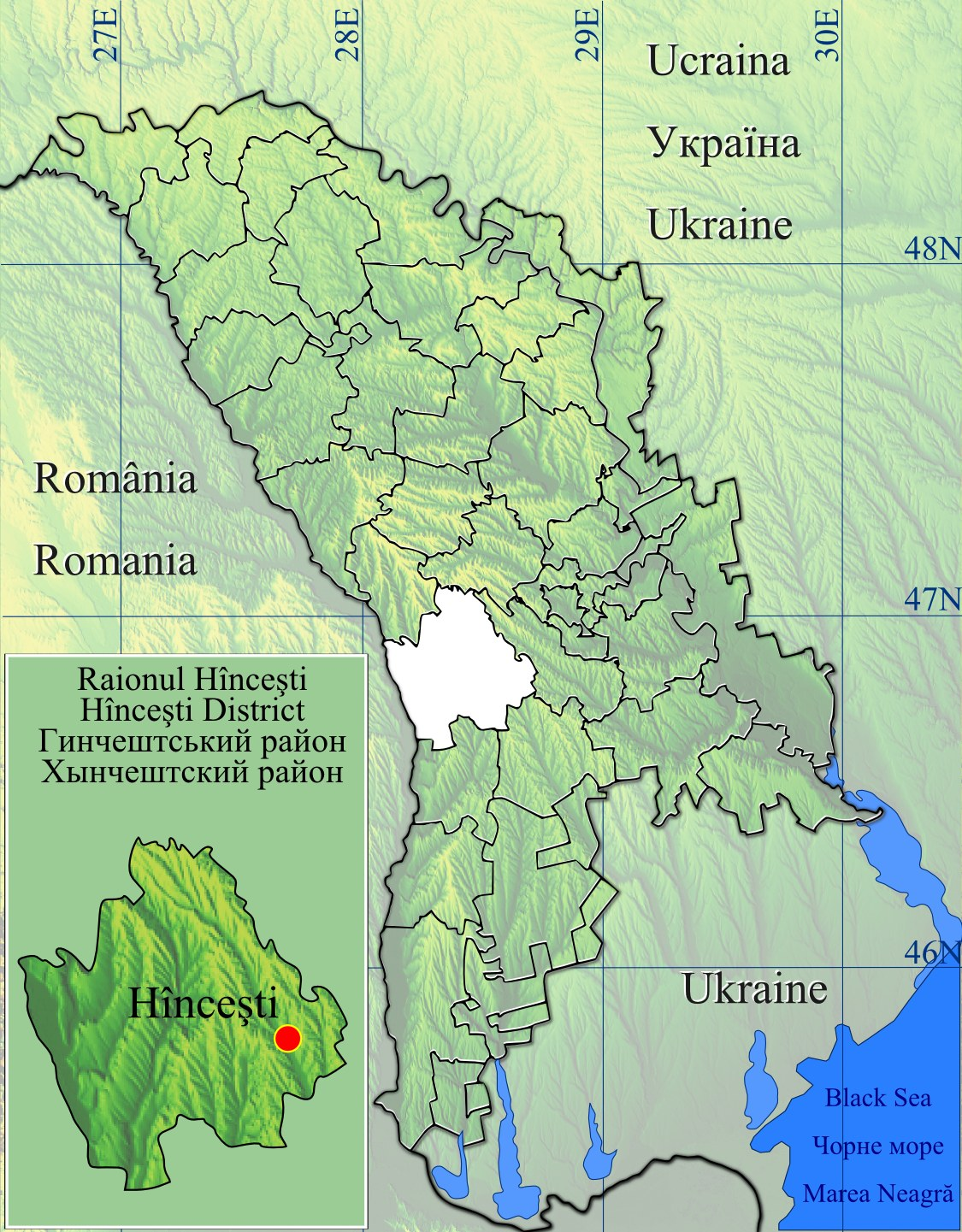
- Location within Hîncești
- Coordinates: 46°39′29″N 28°17′59″E
- Country: Moldova

Government
  - Mayor: Serghei Rotaru (PDM)

Area
  - Total: 211 km^{2} (81 sq mi)

Population (2014 census)
  - Total: 2,382
- Time zone: UTC+2 (EET)
  - Summer (DST): UTC+3 (EEST)
- Postal code: MD-3452

Voinescu is a village in Hîncești District, Moldova.
