= Raabau =

- Former municipality
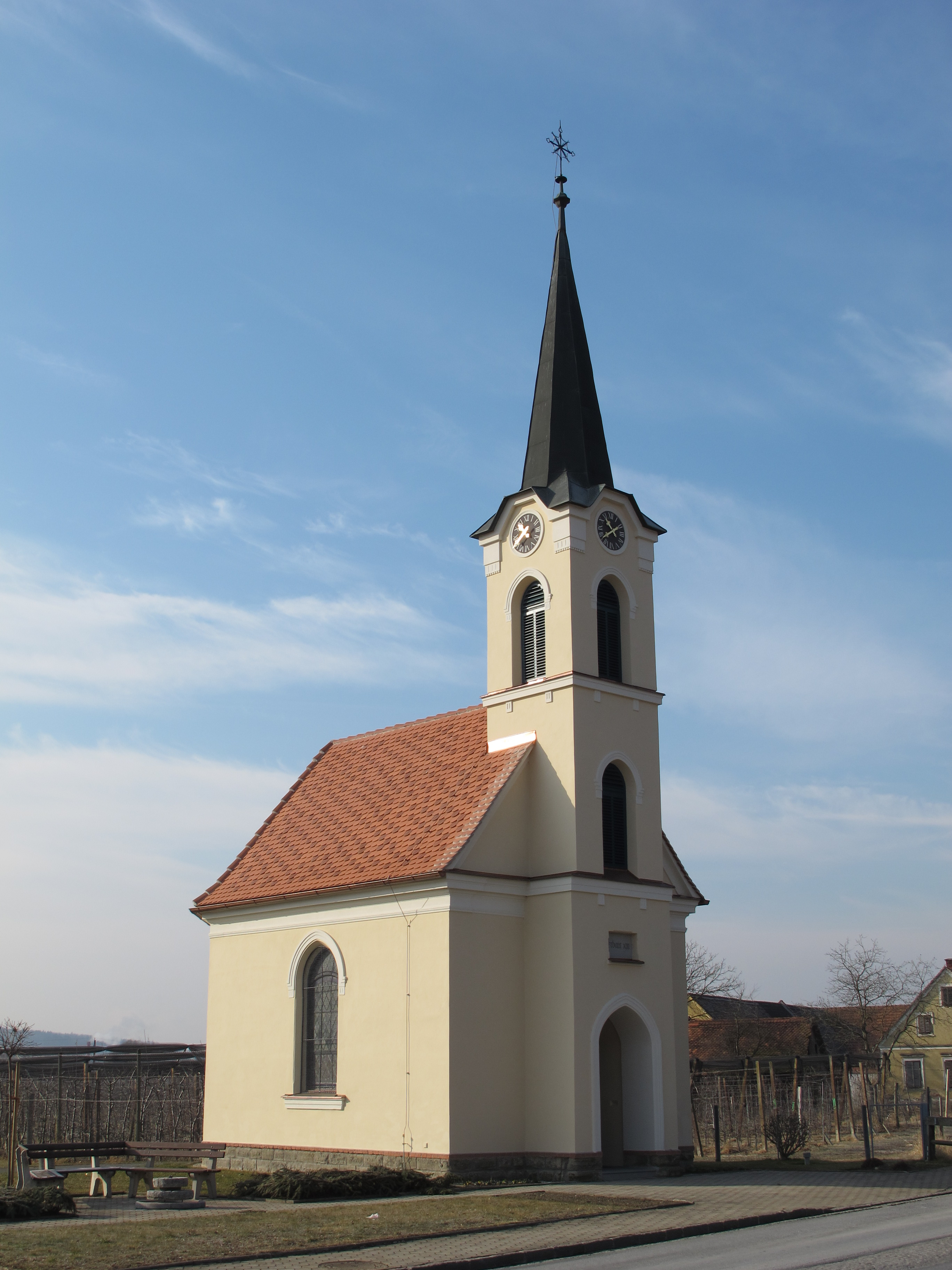
- Chapel in Raabau

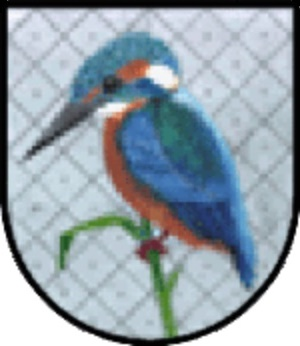
- Coat of arms

- Location within Austria
- Coordinates: 46°58′00″N 15°55′00″E
- Country: Austria
- State: Styria
- District: Südoststeiermark

Area
  - Total: 4 km^{2} (1.5 sq mi)
- Elevation: 282 m (925 ft)

Population (1 January 2016)
  - Total: 589
  - Density: 150/km^{2} (380/sq mi)
- Time zone: UTC+1 (CET)
  - Summer (DST): UTC+2 (CEST)
- Postal code: 8330
- Area code: +43 3152
- Vehicle registration: FB
- Website: www.raabau.at

Raabau is a former municipality in the district of Südoststeiermark in the Austrian state of Styria. Since the 2015 Styria municipal structural reform, it is part of the municipality Feldbach.

== Population ==
Historical population
| Year | Pop. | ±% |
|---|---|---|
| 1869 | 343 | — |
| 1880 | 363 | +5.8% |
| 1890 | 339 | −6.6% |
| 1900 | 326 | −3.8% |
| 1910 | 386 | +18.4% |
| 1923 | 347 | −10.1% |
| 1934 | 372 | +7.2% |
| 1939 | 375 | +0.8% |
| 1951 | 411 | +9.6% |
| 1961 | 516 | +25.5% |
| 1971 | 544 | +5.4% |
| 1981 | 544 | +0.0% |
| 1991 | 542 | −0.4% |
| 2001 | 558 | +3.0% |
| 2013 | 582 | +4.3% |
