= Kuzma Podlas =

Soviet lieutenant-general

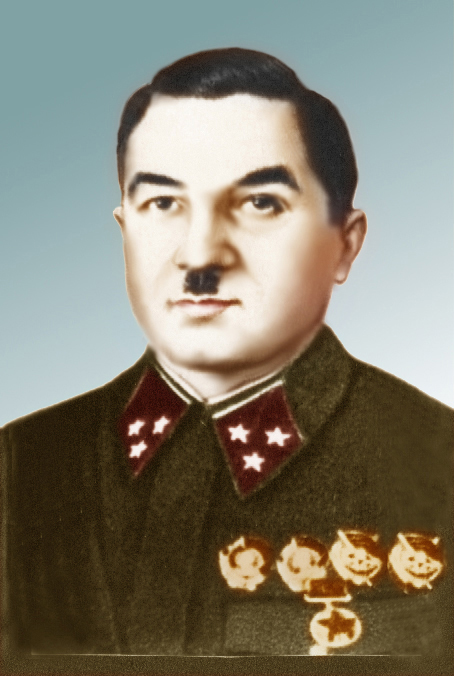
- Born: 29 October 1893; Chernigov Governorate, Russian Empire
- Died: 24 May 1942 (aged 48) Kharkiv Oblast, USSR
- Allegiance: Soviet Union
- Rank: lieutenant general
- Commands: 27th Rifle Division; 1st Red Banner Army; 40th Army; 57th Army
- Conflicts: Great Patriotic War

Kuzma Petrovich Podlas (Russian: Кузьма Петрович Подлас) (1893 – 25 May 1942) was a Soviet lieutenant-general who was killed in action in World War II.

In Russian Civil War, Podlas was a kombrig (brigade commander)) in the Red Army. After the war, he graduated from Vystrel courses (1925) and Frunze Academy (1930).

In 1935, he was promoted to the rank of komdiv (Division commander).

In 1938, Podlas was appointed deputy commander of Kiev Special Military District; shortly thereafter he was appointed commander of the 1st (Coastal) Army of the Far Eastern Military District which took part in Battle of Lake Khasan.

Shortly thereafter he was arrested and sentenced to 5-year imprisonment. However, in 1940 he was released among a few other general officers such as Gorbatov and Rokossovsky and reinstated in his previous position. Following adoption of general ranks in the Red Army, he was created major general.

In August 1941, he took command of the 40th Army, which was trying to stop the advance of Guderian's 2nd Panzer Group to Moscow. After that, he was promoted to lieutenant general. On 22 October 1941 he was awarded the Order of Lenin.

In February 1942 Podlas was given command of the 57th Army. He was killed in action in the Kharkov Counteroffensive. He was a recipient of the Order of the Red Banner.

General Podlas is mentioned in Khruschev's Secret Speech as one of the military commanders who were wrongly accused during Joseph Stalin's Great Purge.
