= Ceadîr =

- Village
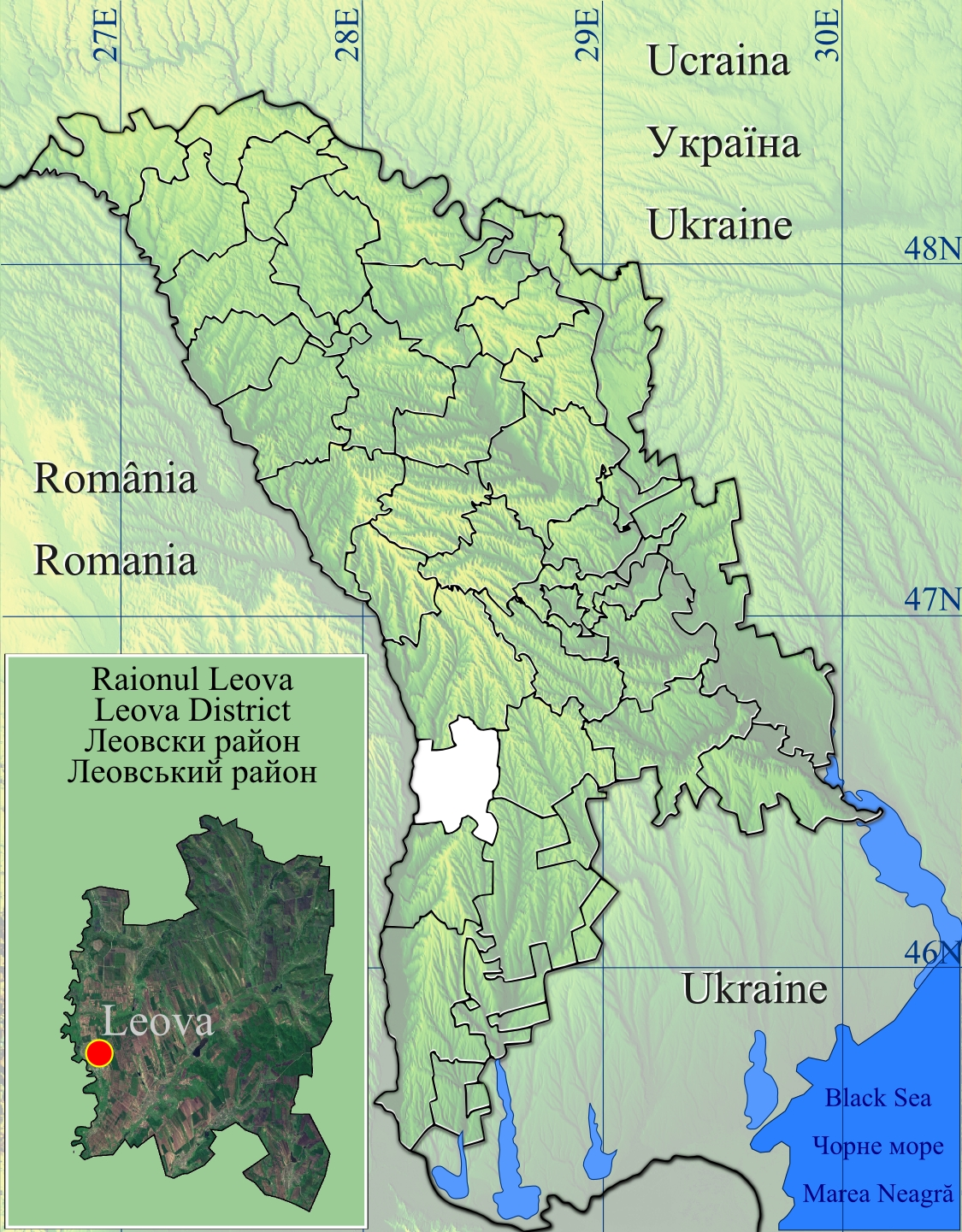
- Location within Moldova Leova
- Coordinates: 46°40′11″N 28°24′27″E
- Country: Moldova

Government
  - Mayor: Mihail Tabac (PLDM)

Area
  - Total: 21.92 km^{2} (8.46 sq mi)
- Elevation: 111 m (364 ft)

Population (2014 census)
  - Total: 1,161
- Time zone: UTC+2 (EET)
  - Summer (DST): UTC+3 (EEST)
- Postal code: MD-6314
- Website: www.ceadir.info

Ceadîr is a village in Leova District, Moldova.
