= Michalok =

- Municipality
- Flag

- Location of Michalok in the Prešov Region Location of Michalok in Slovakia
- Coordinates: 48.98°N 21.63°E
- Country: Slovakia
- Region: Prešov Region
- District: Vranov nad Topľou District
- First mentioned: 1363

Area
  - Total: 12.31 km^{2} (4.75 sq mi)
- Elevation: 262 m (860 ft)

Population (2025)
  - Total: 285
- Time zone: UTC+1 (CET)
  - Summer (DST): UTC+2 (CEST)
- Postal code: 942 3
- Area code: +421 57
- Vehicle registration plate (until 2022): VT
- Website: www.obecmichalok.sk

Michalok (Hungarian: Felsőmihályi, until 1899: Mihálkó) is a village and municipality in Vranov nad Topľou District in the Prešov Region of eastern Slovakia.

== History ==
In historical records the village was first mentioned in 1363.

== Geography ==
The municipality lies at an altitude of 262 metres (860 ft) and covers an area of 12.31 km^{2} (4.75 sq mi) (2025).

== Population ==
Population statistic (10 years)
Year	1995	2005	2015	2025
Count	351	328	302	285
Difference		−6.55%	−7.92%	−5.62%

Population statistic
Year	2024	2025
Count	278	285
Difference		+2.51%

It has a population of 285 people (31 December 2025).

=== Ethnicity ===
Census 2021 (1+ %)
Ethnicity	Number	Fraction
Slovak	268	97.1%
Not found out	7	2.53%
Total	276	

In year 2021 was 276 people by ethnicity 268 as Slovak, 7 as Not found out, 2 as Czech, 1 as Rusyn and 1 as Russian.

Note on population: The difference values of population numbers in the table "Population statistic" and in the sections "Ethnicity" & "Religion" is caused by the use of various statistical methods.

=== Religion ===
Census 2021 (1+ %)
Religion	Number	Fraction
Roman Catholic Church	173	62.68%
Evangelical Church	76	27.54%
None	10	3.62%
Greek Catholic Church	8	2.9%
Not found out	6	2.17%
Total	276	

In year 2021 was 276 people by religion 173 from Roman Catholic Church, 76 from Evangelical Church, 10 from None, 8 from Greek Catholic Church, 6 from Not found out, 2 from Calvinist Church and 1 from United Methodist Church.
