= Bogucharsky District =

Bogucharsky District Богучарский район (Russian)
- District
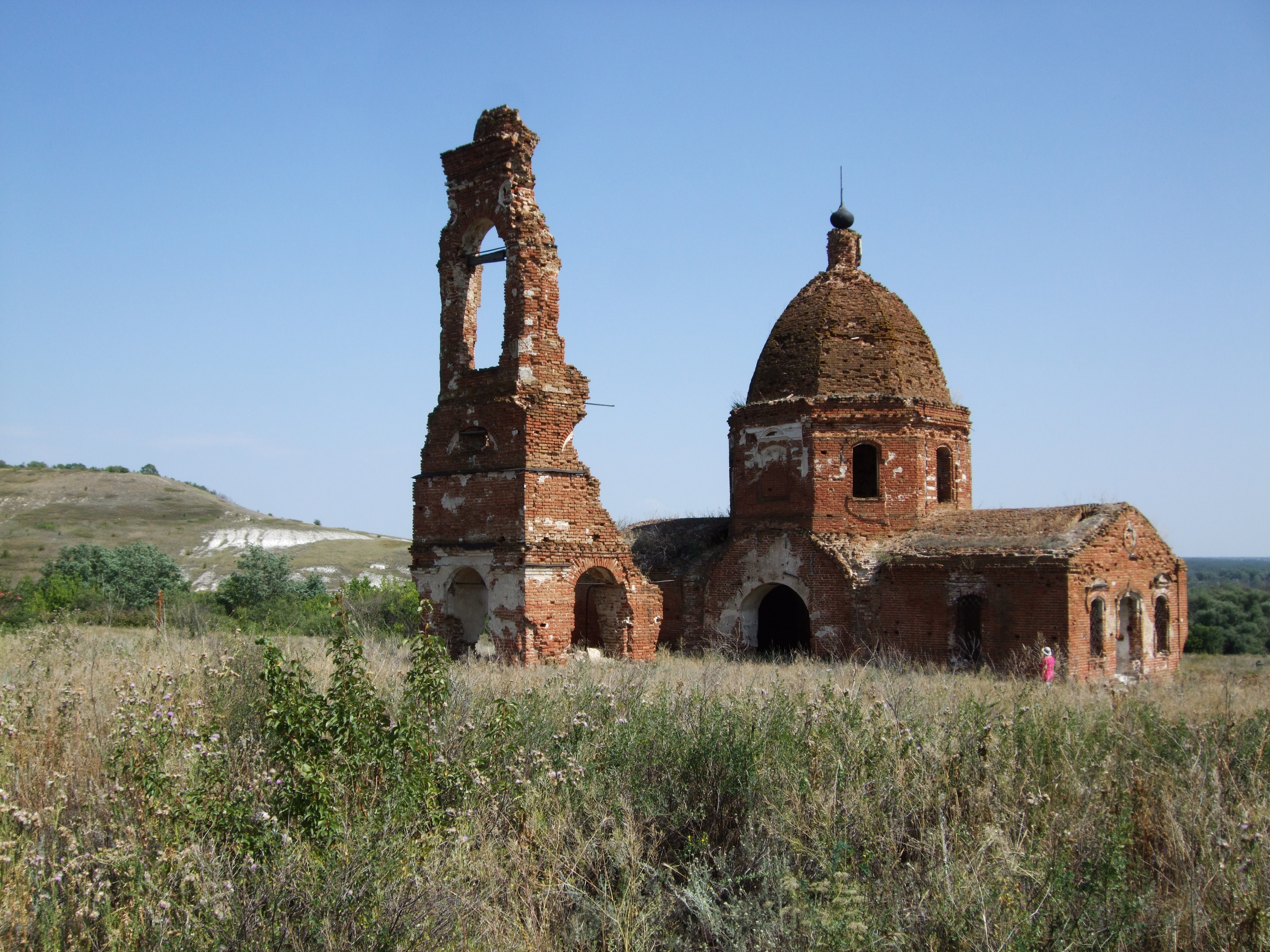
- The St. Nicholas Church in the selo of Abrosimovo in Bogucharsky District

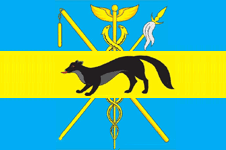
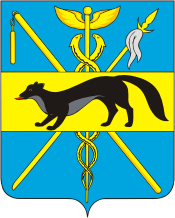
- Flag Coat of arms
- Location of Bogucharsky District in Voronezh Oblast
- Coordinates: 49°56′N 40°33′E
- Country: Russia
- Federal subject: Voronezh Oblast
- Established: 1928
- Administrative center: Boguchar

Area
  - Total: 2,180 km^{2} (840 sq mi)

Population (2010 Census)
  - Total: 37,198
  - Density: 17.1/km^{2} (44.2/sq mi)
  - Urban: 31.8%
  - Rural: 68.2%

Administrative structure
  - Administrative divisions: 1 Urban settlements, 13 Rural settlements
  - Inhabited localities: 1 cities/towns, 49 rural localities

Municipal structure
  - Municipally incorporated as: Bogucharsky Municipal District
  - Municipal divisions: 1 urban settlements, 13 rural settlements
- Time zone: UTC+3 (MSK)
- OKTMO ID: 20605000
- Website: http://www.boguchar.ru/

Bogucharsky District (Russian: Богуча́рский райо́н) is an administrative and municipal district (raion), one of the thirty-two in Voronezh Oblast, Russia. It is located in the south of the oblast. The area of the district is 2,180 square kilometers (840 sq mi). Its administrative center is the town of Boguchar. Population: 38,087 (2021 census); 37,198p2,002=40,719 (2010 census); 33,634 (1989 Soviet census). The population of Boguchar accounts for 37.7% of the district's total population.
