= Boguchar =

Town in Voronezh Oblast, Russia

Boguchar Богучар
- Town
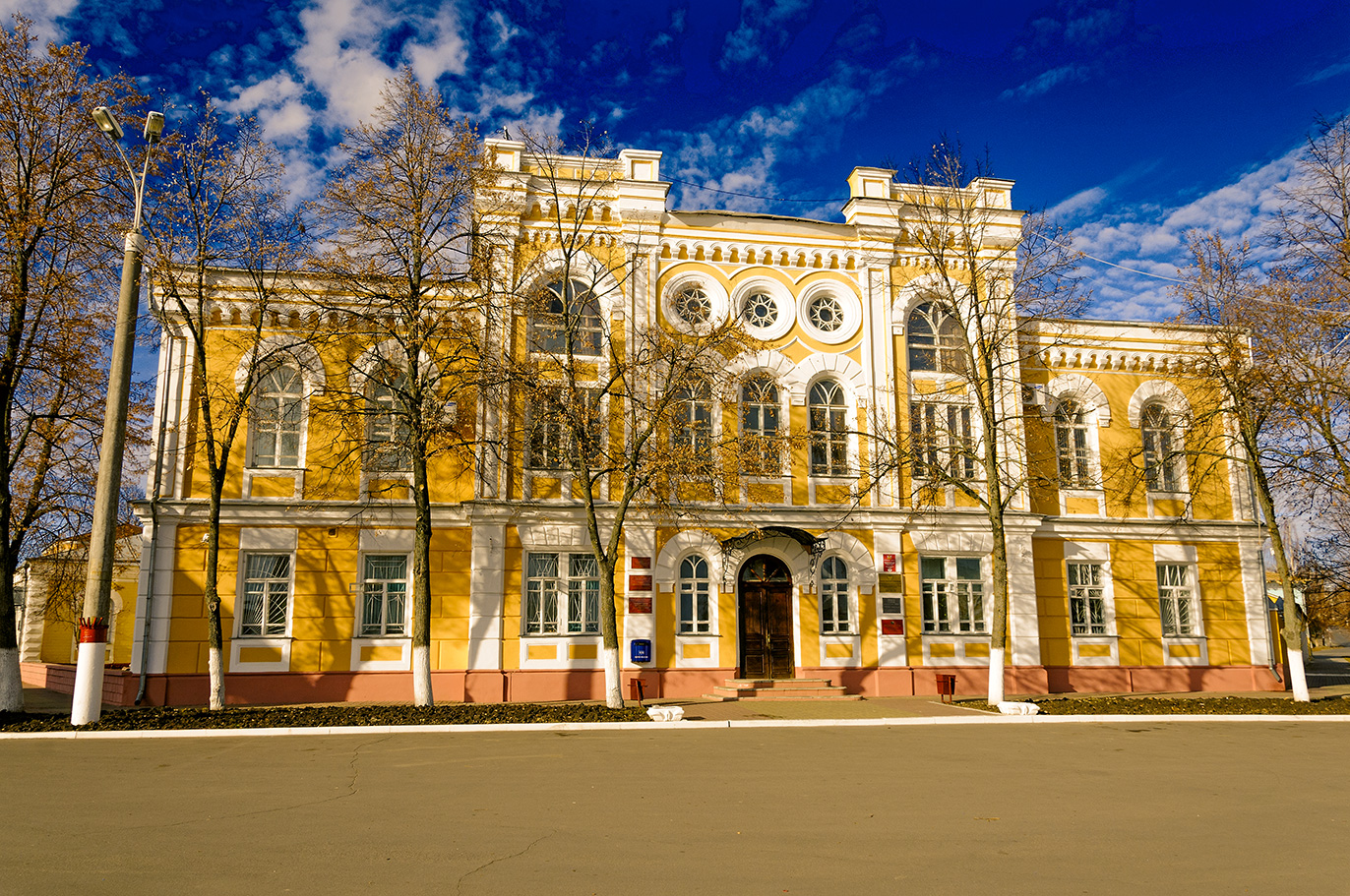

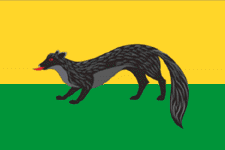
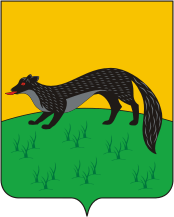
- Flag Coat of arms
- Interactive map of Boguchar
- Location of Boguchar Boguchar (Voronezh Oblast)
- Coordinates: 49°57′N 40°33′E
- Country: Russia
- Federal subject: Voronezh Oblast
- Administrative district: Bogucharsky District
- Urban settlementSelsoviet: Boguchar
- Founded: 1704
- Town status since: 1779
- Elevation: 80 m (260 ft)

Population (2010 Census)
  - Total: 11,811
  - Estimate (2025): 14,165 (+19.9%)

Administrative status
  - Capital of: Bogucharsky District, Boguchar Urban Settlement

Municipal status
  - Municipal district: Bogucharsky Municipal District
  - Urban settlement: Boguchar Urban Settlement
  - Capital of: Bogucharsky Municipal District, Boguchar Urban Settlement
- Time zone: UTC+3 (MSK)
- Postal codes: 396790–396792, 396799
- OKTMO ID: 20605101001
- Website: gorod-boguchar.ru

Boguchar (Russian: Богуча́р) is a town and the administrative center of Bogucharsky District in Voronezh Oblast, Russia, located on the Boguchar River (a tributary of the Don River), 243 kilometers (151 mi) south of Voronezh, the administrative center of the oblast. Population: 14,370 (2021 census); 11,811 (2010 census); 13,756 (2002 census); 8,499 (1989 Soviet census).

== History ==
Isaac Massa's map of Southern Russia printed in 1638 indicates a settlement near the confluence of the Boguchar River with Don called Bogunar (an apparent misspelling caused by the similarity of Cyrillic letters ч (ch) and н (n)). However, it is located on a different place than present-day Boguchar, in particular, on the left bank of the Don River. In the 17th century, the region was inhabited by Don Cossacks, but was devastated during the suppression of the Bulavin Rebellion (1707–08), in which the upper Don Cossacks played a major role. Afterwards, the area has never been a part of the Don Cossack Host, but rather of Sloboda Ukraine and later Voronezh Governorate, since it was settled by the Ostrogozhsk cossacks of Ukrainian ethnicity in the years 1716–17. The town status was granted to Boguchar in 1779. According to the 1897 census, the town had a population of 6,636, of which 64.6% were Ukrainians, 32.9% were Russians, 1.4% were Romani and 0.9% were Jews.

== Administrative and municipal status ==
Within the framework of administrative divisions, Boguchar serves as the administrative center of Bogucharsky District. As an administrative division, it is incorporated within Bogucharsky District as Boguchar Urban Settlement. As a municipal division, this administrative unit also has urban settlement status and is a part of Bogucharsky Municipal District.

== Military ==
Boguchar is home to elements of the 3rd Motor Rifle Division of the Russian Ground Forces. These units are part of the 20th Guards Combined Arms Army, Western Military District.
