= 152nd Rifle Division =

152nd Rifle Division (October 1939 – November 10, 1941) 152nd Rifle Division (January 4, 1942 - February 18, 1947)
- Active: 1939–1947
- Country: Soviet Union
- Branch: Red Army
- Type: Infantry
- Size: Division
- Engagements: Operation Barbarossa; Battle of Smolensk (1941); Battle of Moscow; Defense of the Arctic; Third Battle of Kharkov; Donbas strategic offensive (August 1943); Battle of the Dnieper; Nikopol–Krivoi Rog offensive Bereznegovatoye–Snigirevka offensive Operation Bagration; Bobruysk offensive Baranovichi-Slonim offensive Lublin–Brest offensive Gumbinnen Operation; East Prussian offensive Heiligenbeil Pocket; Battle of Halbe; Battle of Berlin
- Decorations: Order of Lenin; Order of the Red Banner; Order of Suvorov (all 2nd Formation)
- Battle honours: Dniepropetrovsk (2nd Formation)

Commanders
- Notable commanders: Col. Pyotr Nikolaevich Chernyshev; Maj. Gen. Grigorii Ivanovich Vekhin; Maj. Gen. Vasilii Petrovich Karuna; Col. Pyotr Ivanovich Kulizhskii; Col. Andriyan Timofeevich Kuzin; Col. Grigorii Leontevich Rybalka

The 152nd Rifle Division was originally formed as an infantry division of the Red Army in October 1939 in the Transbaikal Military District, based on the shtat (table of organization and equipment) of the previous month. After remaining in that District through 1940 it was moving to the west in June 1941 as part of 16th Army when the German invasion began. Shortly after arriving at the fighting front it was pocketed by forces of Army Group Center west of Smolensk, along with most of its Army. The division fought in semi-encirclement through the latter half of July under this command, mostly in abortive efforts to recapture the city, suffering heavy casualties, before its remnants were able to withdraw across the Dniepr River in the first days of August. After several weeks rebuilding in reserve it rejoined 16th Army for an abortive offensive toward Dukhovshchina in early September. In anticipation of a further German offensive on Moscow the 152nd was again moved to the reserve as part of Group Boldin, but was badly placed to intervene effectively against the penetration of 3rd Panzer Group. With the fall of Vyazma on October 7 it was encircled and attempted to break out over the following days, but only remnants were successful, and on November 10 it was disbanded.

A new 152nd was designated in January 1942 in the South Ural Military District. Once formed it was moved by rail to Karelian Front, arriving as an offensive was launched against German/Finnish forces west of Murmansk. In the process of joining 14th Army it was caught by extreme weather on the open tundra and suffered heavy casualties from exposure. It remained on this sector until January 1943 when it made another long-distance move, now to 6th Army in Southwestern Front. It remained on the defense east of the Donets River into August, when it took part in the offensive that retook the Donbas region before heading toward the Dniepr in the Dnipro area. In mid-October it staged a successful crossing of the river and soon received the name of that city as a battle honor, as well as the Order of the Red Banner, while several men, including the division's commander, became Heroes of the Soviet Union. After a couple of months in 1st Guards Army it was reassigned to 46th Army in the renamed 3rd Ukrainian Front for the winter battles in the great bend of the Dniepr. After advancing toward the estuary of the Dniestr River in March as part of 8th Guards Army it was sent north to Belarus to join 28th Army in 1st Belorussian Front for the summer offensive. During Operation Bagration it was on the extreme left flank of the initial offensive and fought into the Pinsk Marshes, separating the German 9th and 2nd Armies, and advancing on Baranavichy, winning the Order of Suvorov in the process. After the capture of Brest it moved with its Army back to the Reserve of the Supreme High Command and then to 3rd Belorussian Front on the border of East Prussia. During the offensive in January 1945 it forced its way through the strong German defenses, helping to cut off the capital city of Königsberg. In March it played a major role in eliminating the group of German forces pocketed southwest of that city and was given the rare award of the Order of Lenin. 28th Army again entered the Reserve of the Supreme High Command and was now transferred to 1st Ukrainian Front, arriving as the final campaign was reaching its climax. The 152nd helped complete the encirclement of German 9th Army south of Berlin, and then pushed into the city itself in the last days of the battle. After a unique and distinguished combat path that moved from the Arctic to the south of Ukraine and all the way to Berlin the division was moved to Belarus, where it was disbanded in February 1947.

== 1st Formation ==
The 152nd began forming in October 1939, at Chita in the Transbaikal Military District. In early June 1941 it began moving west by rail, intended to reach the areas of Shepetivka and Berdychiv in the Kiev Special Military District. At this time its order of battle was as follows:

- 480th Rifle Regiment
- 544th Rifle Regiment
- 646th Rifle Regiment
- 333rd Artillery Regiment
- 492nd Howitzer Artillery Regiment
- 257th Antitank Battalion
- 117th Antiaircraft Battalion
- 112th Reconnaissance Company
- 228th Sapper Battalion
- 220th Signal Battalion
- 274th Medical/Sanitation Battalion (later 50th)
- 212th Chemical Defense (Anti-gas) Platoon
- 200th Motor Transport Battalion
- 130th Field Bakery
- 613th Field Postal Station
- 291st Field Office of the State Bank

Col. Pyotr Nikolaevich Chernyshev had been appointed to command on March 22 and would lead the division through its entire first formation. At the outbreak of the war it was in 16th Army's 32nd Rifle Corps, along with the 46th Rifle Division. On June 26 the Army, under command of Lt. Gen. M. F. Lukin, was diverted northward from Ukraine toward Smolensk, which was being threatened by armored forces of Army Group Center. Lukin's chief of staff, Col. M. A. Shalin, would later declare that "[t]he command group with supporting units, 32d Rifle Corps, as well as some units of 5th Mechanized Corps, are [still] at peacetime establishment strength." Given that the 152nd had been established as a half-strength reserve division, its peacetime strength would have been roughly 6,000 personnel.

== Battle of Smolensk ==
As of July 1 Lukin's force was an army in name only, consisting of the two divisions of 32nd Corps, the 126th Cannon Artillery Regiment, 112th Antiaircraft Battalion, and 5th Mechanized, which would lose most of its strength due to breakdowns and fighting with XXXXVII Motorized Corps near Lyepyel during July 6-10. By the latter date 5th Mechanized had been reassigned and 16th Army had received the 57th Tank Division. On July 14 the Army officially entered the fighting front as it was assigned to Western Front, commanded by Marshal S. K. Timoshenko. He immediately assigned it the mission of creating an "antitank region" to prevent the German grouping around Velizh from "attacking southward from the Demidov and Dukhovshchina regions to reach the Smolensk and Iartsevo road" while also attacking toward Gorki with 32nd Rifle and 17th Mechanized Corps to destroy the German panzers in cooperation with 13th and 4th Armies, both of which were badly battered from the frontier battles.

Lukin attempted to put this into action with an attack by his advance guard, consisting of part of the 152nd, two platoons of BT-7 tanks of the 57th Division, a mobile motorized detachment, and a brigade of four militia battalions from Smolensk. At 2300 hours on July 17 the 16th Army staff reported in detail on the division's progress:

152nd RD (five rifle battalions) - reconnoitering along the Zagor'e, Maloe Vozmishche, Buda, Kuprino, and Katyn Station line [28km north-northwest to 25km west of Smolensk] with no enemy to its front, with 1st Bn, 626th RR, supporting 46th RD at Demidov, 1st Bn 480th RR, supporting 17th TD along the Svinaia River and Litivlia line [50km west-southwest of Smolensk], 3rd Bn, 544th RR, defending with 57th TD in the woods north of Krasnyi [50km southwest of Smolensk], and 3rd Bn, 480th RR, withdrawing toward Smolensk (but location unknown). The reconnaissance platoon of 646th RR encountered 4 enemy tanks in Blonnaia.

The advance force managed to halt the advance of the 18th Panzer Division for three days and went on to join the encirclement battle north and west of the city. The 18th had been badly depleted since Barbarossa began and would soon be reduced to just 12 operable panzers. However, during this time the 29th Motorized Division reached Smolensk's southern outskirts, and on July 16 began a three-day fight for the city center and its important railway bridge with the 152nd and the recently arrived 129th Rifle Division, which had been part of 19th Army. By day's end on July 18 Smolensk was mostly in German hands, and 16th Army was partially encircled, along with the remnants of the 19th and other formations retreating from the frontier.

Despite this success, it was increasingly clear that 29th Motorized and 18th Panzer were incapable of linking up with XXXIX Motorized Corps' 7th Panzer Division advancing from the north to complete the encirclement. Soviet forces were continuing to resist strongly, and the German mobile forces did not have sufficient infantry to seal the gaps. As the V Army Corps and IX Army Corps closed on Smolensk from northwest and southwest respectively to relieve the motorized troops the 152nd and 129th incorporated many company and battalion-size groups from defeated divisions and put them into action in a battle that continued for ten days. Timoshenko had received orders from the STAVKA to hold (or retake) the city "at all cost." On July 19 Lt. Gen. A. I. Yeryomenko took over Western Front, while Timoshenko remained in command of the Western Direction. By this time Lukin had begun moving his two divisions from the west and southwest part of the pocket to concentrate them for the recapture of Smolensk. The 129th still had a foothold in the northern part of the city.

At 2000 hours that day Lukin was finally able to report to Front headquarters on his Army's situation, which included:

152nd RD - Regrouped its units, with 544th RR (less five rifle companies) along the Iavishche, Kasplia, and Bol'shoe Vozmishche line; 646th RR (less six rifle companies) along the Borodenka, Zyki, and Ermaki line; and 480th RR (less 5th RCo), along the Kuprino, Katyn' Station, and to the Dnepr Liver line [from 30km northwest to 25km west of Smolensk], and with its reconnaissance groups in contact with the enemy, and observed the enemy preparing crossing sites over the Dnepr River in the Krasnyi Bor and Nizhnaia Iasennaia region on its left flank.

By now the armies in the pocket were under control of the commander of 20th Army, Lt. Gen. P. A. Kurochkin. Under his orders Lukin handed his sector west and north of the city to Kurochkin's army and sent the 152nd and 46th to reinforce the 129th. The 152nd entered the fight for Smolensk on July 20 after regrouping to Muk and Iatsinino some 5-7km to the northwest. In the course of this move it engaged a number of small German reconnaissance groups on its right wing as well as a pair of motorized infantry battalions backed by a battalion of artillery firing over the Dniepr from the Borovaia area. Lukin also reported shortages of food, ammunition, and radios, and disorganization in the medical services.

=== The fight for the city ===
16th Army attacked from the north toward Smolensk beginning at 0100 hours on July 21. This led to protracted street fighting through the day in the northern part of the city. The 480th Regiment, less one battalion, retook Smolensk Station and advanced another 1,000m toward the city center, while the 544th Regiment reached the Dniepr. 29th Motorized was forced to withdraw most of its forces from the part of the city north of the river. However, Lukin reported that the personnel losses among his forces had reached 40 percent. The fighting continued the next day, as the 34th Rifle Corps joined the attack from the southeast; although this was unsuccessful the XXXXVII Motorized Corps was forced to send the 17th Panzer Division to assist 29th Motorized, which in turn helped prevent the closing of the pocket. On the evening of July 23, Western Front reported, in part, that the 152nd had retaken the northwestern part of the city. However, early the next day Lukin's headquarters was forced to report that the Army had failed to completely clear the northern part of Smolensk, and the 152nd was hindered by the absence of two battalions that had been "loaned" to 20th Army. The attack was to be renewed with the addition of the 46th Division. Through this entire battle Army Group Center was making every effort to disengage its motorized and panzer forces in order to renew the advance toward Moscow, but the infantry was slow to move up.

The situation within the pocket became increasingly difficult, despite Group Rokossovskii holding the gap in the Yartsevo area. Late on July 25 one of the battalions of the 152nd that had been attached to 20th Army was ordered to concentrate near Krasnyi Bor to return to Chernyshev's command. The next morning the Front reported that 16th Army was attacking into the southeastern part of Smolensk, while also fortifying its positions in the northern part; the division was specifically noted as digging in on the north bank of the Dniepr while mopping up remaining German units. Kurochkin sent a detailed report to Timoshenko at noon on July 27 in which he stated that 16th Army was now facing the 137th Infantry Division within the city. By now the 152nd and 129th had been reduced to a combined total of 6,000 combat infantry. At 2100 hours Lukin reported that the German force in southern Smolensk now included "a probable SS motorized division" (Das Reich), two tank battalions, one or two artillery battalions, and the 137th. The two rifle divisions were displaying "organization, energy, and audacity in combat", in particularly the latter.

Lukin was still determined to recapture the rest of Smolensk, but at 1400 hours on July 29 he sent an operational summary to Timoshenko which would have far reaching consequences. He reported that part of his Army was attacking toward Smolensk and, regarding the 152nd specifically the 480th Regiment was at Korokhotkino on the Smolensk road 6km north of the city and the 544th Regiment was south of that position. Further, he stated that since 0800 the division had been attacked by a German regiment "with massive artillery and air support" and forced to fall back eastward to the right flank of the 129th at Tserkovishchi, 10km north-northeast of the city along the Stabna River after suffering heavy losses. Colonel Chernyshev was said to have been wounded twice. The 129th had also retreated to the Stabna with two regiments. The report clearly indicated that 16th Army was no longer in Smolensk, and Timoshenko, under considerable stress, took this to indicated that both it and 20th Army were not only preparing to withdraw from the pocket but actively doing so, abandoning the city. In fact, the V Army Corps had two divisions pushing east over the lower Stabna, leaving Lukin's divisions no choice but to fall back or die in place.

Timoshenko responded to this apparent insubordination by sending both Lukin and Kurochkin a severe warning:

From your morning summary of 29 July, I ascertained, first, that you are carrying out a risky withdrawal despite orders to hold on to your positions, which is all the more intolerable in light of the operations being conducted by Groups Khomenko, Kalinin, and Rokossovsky, whose orders you are aware of.

He noted that none of their earlier reports had indicated any need to withdraw, and he therefore ordered them to:

Immediately halt the withdrawal of 16th and 20th Armies to positions west [east?] of Smolensk. Clear the enemy from Smolensk and keep it [the city] in your hands and do not abandon any position for any reason without my orders.

At 1430 on July 30 Lukin sent fresh orders to his units, in which he stated that 20th Army would attack the northern outskirts of Smolensk early the next day, and his own 46th, 152nd and 129th would attack "decisively" at 0400 with the same objective, while also defending the Kolodnia and Dniepr River line. The 152nd would immediately advance with a forward detachment to prevent any German penetration to the east, then capture the northeastern outskirts with its main forces before retaking the railway station. His orders ended with various exhortations to take the city at all costs, that "retreat means death", all of which seemed to be directed more to Timoshenko, although he apparently did not receive a copy. Soon after midnight on July 31 a new report from Lukin did reach Timoshenko in which he laid out all the difficulties faced by his men, along with criticism of Kurochkin and a large amount of self-justification. Timoshenko now had to assuage the anger of the STAVKA with a candid explanation of what had happened at Smolensk, while stating the movements were "without my sanction." After laying out the tremendous pressure faced by 20th Army he wrote:

20th Army, while withdrawing 73rd RD on its left wing on 28 July, uncovered the right flank and rear of 16th Army's 152nd RD, which was fighting in the northern part of Smolensk. Observing 73rd RD's withdrawal, 152nd RD, which, according to Lukin was under strong enemy pressure against its flanks and rear, began to withdraw eastward from Smolensk in accordance with its commander's orders. Then 129th RD, which was behind 152nd RD, also withdrew from the northeastern part of Smolensk.

He went on to state that when the Western Direction and Western Front headquarters became aware of the situation, Kurochkin was ordered to halt the withdrawal of the 152nd and 129th, but the following counterattacks on July 29 by the 152nd, 73rd and 46th failed and they fell back eastward with heavy losses. His counterattack orders for July 31 were impossible to carry out, as the divisions of the two armies each had only 1,000-2,000 men remaining, were under heavy attack, short of ammunition and fuel, and dependent on air supply by less than a dozen TB-3s per night.

==== Withdrawal from the pocket ====
This appreciation gave both Lukin and Kurochkin effective sanction to reorganize their remaining forces to break out to the east through the corridor that was being held by Group Rokossovskii. This movement put increasing pressure on the blocking positions held by XXXIX and XXXXVII Motorized Corps, which were also under attack from outside the pocket as well as Rokossovskii's troops in between. As early as July 29 a few mobile detachments of 16th Army had reached out to 38th Rifle Division along the Dniepr southwest of Yartsevo.

As of August 1 the pocket had been reduced to 20km from east to west and 28km from north to south. 20th Army was defending the northern half, and 16th Army's five divisions (127th, 129th, 152nd, and 34th Rifle Corps' 46th and 158th) were deployed in the southern half. The overall strength of the Soviet forces had declined from over 220,000 in mid-July to under 100,000, with inadequate supplies of fuel and ammunition. Lukin's report at 1900 hours stated that at least one German infantry division had attacked at 0600 with extensive artillery and air support and:

After defeating 20th Army's left wing and bypassing its 229th RD's flank and rear, the enemy launched its main attack against 16th Army, exploited success at the boundary between 152nd RD and 34th RC, and is [now] reconnoitering toward Dukhovskaia [15km east of Smolensk].
The withdrawal of 20th Army's left wing immediately uncovered the [152nd] division's flank and rear to a depth of 2-3 kilometres, and, while attracting the enemy's main attack, the division fought fiercely and repeatedly launched counterattacks, but, after suffering heavy losses and lacking artillery and machine guns, it is conducting a fighting withdrawal to the east under the pressure of superior enemy forces. All the while the division is holding on to the Mordvino line.

The report went on to state it had occupied a line from Dukhovskaia to Staroe Shishlovo by 1900. Lukin added that the situation was "tense", there was no ammunition for the artillery, and the divisions had lost all or most of their heavy machine guns.

Under the circumstances Timoshenko realized the only possible course was to pull as many forces as still possible from the shrinking pocket to fight again east of Smolensk. While the breakout was initially referred to as an "attack" toward Dukhovshchina its true nature was not in question. Lukin reported at 0900 hours on August 2 that German forces were again pressing at the boundary between the 152nd and the 34th Corps, and that he was directing Chernyshev to "defend the Puzovo and Tiushino sector on the eastern bank of the Bol'shoi Vopets River... to prevent the enemy from penetrating to Liubkovo and Zavrazh'e." He was to continue to defend the Dniepr on that sector until 0500 on August 4. Chernyshev and all other commanders were reminded that they were personally responsible for getting all weapons across the river during the withdrawal.

The withdrawal began in earnest overnight on August 2/3, where necessary taking on strongpoints of company size held by the 20th Motorized Division. Since this division had not extended its lines south to Ratchino there was a roughly 10km-wide gap between its left flank at Babeeva and 17th Panzer's right south of the Dniepr opposite Malinovka. The gap contained several crossing sites to which 16th Army gravitated, but some of its forces had to face the riskier path of penetrating on infiltrating the German lines. After emerging from the pocket the 152nd was reassigned to 19th Army and on August 6 was ordered to attack toward Dukhovshchina with the rest of this Army. This was soon countermanded as Lukin reestablished his grip on his Army and instead assigned the division the task to "relieve 107th RD's 1st Bn, 586th RR along the Iakovskoe and Kalita front [18-20km north of Yelnya] and dispatch reinforced combat security forward to the Osovo and Erilovo front." On the same day Kurochkin was reassigned to 43rd Army and Lukin took over the 20th. He was promised by the STAVKA that the remnants of his 16th Army would be incorporated into the 20th. At 0120 hours on August 7 he reiterated the order to relieve the 107th, now including the 127th and 158th Divisions in the relieving force, with orders to dig in and defend the road from Yelnya to Dorogobuzh. The 152nd's sector was soon narrowed down to Kaskovo to Kalita, 28-33km southeast of Solovevo. It was soon joined by the 127th on this line.

=== Dukhovshchina Offensives ===
By August 8 the 20th Army had eight rifle divisions, including the 152nd, in various states of repair, under command. Overall, the former 16th Army forces had a combined strength of 13,956 personnel, but only 7,971 rifles and an even greater shortage of other weapons and vehicles. In the same report the 152nd was stated as being in receipt of nine march battalions, for an influx of 5,760 men. As these were being incorporated, on August 20 the division was reported as being in the Western Front reserves in the Kakushkino region. The next day Timoshenko ordered it to concentrate in the Afanaskovo area by dawn on August 23 to take up a defensive line from Neslovo Sovkhoz to Nikola Kremianyi Sovkhoz and create antitank defenses along several axes.

At the behest of Stalin, on August 25-26 the STAVKA ordered Timoshenko's Western Front, Army Gen. G. K. Zhukov's Reserve Front, and Yeryomenko's new Bryansk Front to mount a coordinated general counteroffensive against Army Group Center. In the directive issued to Timoshenko he was to "destroy the opposing enemy and, in cooperation with forces on the Reserve Front's left wing, reach the Velizh, Demidov, and Smolensk front by 8 September." By August 30 the 152nd had returned to 16th Army, now under command of Rokossovskii, and it was to join the general offensive on that date along with the 38th, 108th, and 144th Rifle Divisions. This force was to attack toward Novosele, Mushkovichi, Dukhovshchina and Smolensk, moving back to Front reserve once 19th and 20th Armies reached Smolensk. In the event, the offensive was postponed until September 1.

In the orders sent by Timoshenko's headquarters on August 30 the 152nd (with attached 214th Rifle Regiment of 38th Division and supported by 1st and 3rd Battalions of 471st Gun Artillery Regiment) was to "attack in the Novosel'e and Khatyni sector [southeast of Dukhovshchina] with the immediate mission to capture the Kudinova, Panina, and Khatyni line and reach the southwestern outskirts of Soprykina and Hill 234.9 by day's end on 1 September." This was to be preceded by a 30-minute artillery preparation. The 214th Regiment was to rejoin the 38th after the first line was reached. Overall, with the remainder of 38th Division and the 1st Tank Division, backed by the 127th Tank Brigade, Rokossovskii had concentrated some 20,000 soldiers and 140-150 tanks on a 5km-wide sector, facing one regiment of the 28th Infantry Division, roughly 5,500 men. The 108th Division would attack in support across the Vop River on September 2. Despite these impressive figures, the 152nd and 1st Tanks would first have to cross the Vop themselves, as well as several other north-south streams through their attack sector. The defenders were well dug in with interlocking artillery, mortar, and machine gun fire.

As of September 1 the 152nd, 108th, and 38th Divisions had been organized as the 44th Rifle Corps. The offensive began at dawn and by 1500 hours Rokossovskii was reporting to Western Front on the division as follows:

152nd RD - occupies [the following] positions by 1200 hours:
* 544th RR - captured the unnamed heights 1.5 kilometres north of Khatyni.
* 480th RR - fighting along the line from the eastern slopes of Hill 217.9 to the eastern outskirts of Khatyni.
* 646th RR - in second echelon in the grove east of Dubrovo [on the east bank of the Vop].
Losses and trophies are being verified, and 14 prisoners have been seized.
Headquarters - the grove 2 kilometres southeast of Ozerishche.

Road conditions were reported as satisfactory for the movement of both motorized and other vehicles. At the end of the day Rokossovskii's chief of staff reported to Front headquarters that the division had reached the east bank of a stream south of Samuilova, and the forward defenses of the 28th Infantry had been partly destroyed. On the other hand, the supporting armor was predictably hindered by several watercourses and was subject to flanking fire.

For the next day the shock group was to go back on the offensive at 1000 hours. The 152nd's immediate mission was to capture the Grishino and Gorodok line (15km west-southwest of Yartsevo) before attacking toward Medvedeva. This was along the boundary between the 28th Infantry and 14th Motorized Divisions. By 1700 it was reported as being on a line from the western outskirts of Soprykina south of the eastern slopes of Hill 234.9, which had been assaulted several times without success. The 16th Army reported that the defenders were strengthening the amount of artillery and mortar fire along its entire front. Altogether the division, along with 1st Tanks, gained no more than 2km. A further report at 0300 on September 3 stated that the 544th Regiment was digging in on a line from Kudinova to Kudinovo, facing to the northwest; the 480th Regiment was likewise digging in on Hill 234.9; and the 646th Regiment was entrenching on the north edge of the woods 1.5km north of Khatyni. As trophies the division claimed a battery of 105mm guns, six tanks, and "many mortars and other weapons."

The plan for that day was to concentrate and commit essentially all of the remaining combat-capable forces of 16th Army and Lt. Gen. I. S. Konev's 19th Army against the center and right wing of 26th Infantry and that part of 14th Motorized defending west of the Tsarevich River. This would put roughly 55,000 attackers and nearly 80 tanks against just under 20,000 defenders with little or no armor. Due to delays from regrouping and a plan by Timoshenko to mislead the German command, his armies struck at different times, with Rokossovskii's main attack beginning at 1400 hours. The Front reported at 2000 that, in essence, 16th Army had made limited gains at best, and the 152nd was "fighting in its previous positions." In part this was due to a counterattack by a regiment of either 28th Infantry or 14th Motorized which was met by 127th Tank Brigade, leading to an intermixing of forward positions of both sides. In addition, German artillery west and northwest of Yartsevo tended to fire indiscriminately on both sides. Most of the fighting was at close range or hand-to-hand. By noon, the commander of VIII Army Corps, which contained both German divisions, was pleading with 9th Army for reinforcements.

Rokossovskii sent out his orders for September 4 at 0610 hours in anticipation of a noon start time. Chernyshev was directed to protect his left flank along the line Semukhina–Soprykino–Hill 234.9 from the west with one regiment while attacking toward Hill 221.3 and Mkhovka with his remaining forces in an effort to reach a line from the latter place to Vorotyshino, 10km northwest of Yartsevo, by the end of the day. The attack was to be preceded by a 15-minute artillery preparation. The Red Army still had the manpower advantage, but this would be reduced as the 255th Infantry Division moved up to cover the boundary between the 28th Infantry and 14th Motorized.

Western Front's summary issued at 2000 hours that evening made it clear that any initial momentum had been lost, admitting that 16th Army's attack had been unsuccessful; the 152nd specifically had made a small advance on its left wing and was now holding the western slopes of Hill 234.9. Rokossovskii tried to reignite his attack with orders on the morning of September 5, even as Timoshenko was reducing the overall offensive. Chernyshev was directed as follows:

152nd RD (with 127th TB's 35 TR [Tank Regiment], 214th AR [Artillery Regiment], and 1st and 2nd Bns, 471st GAR) - while protecting your left wing along the Semukhina, Soprykina, and Hill 234.9 line against enemy counterattacks from the southwest with one RR, attack the enemy with the remaining forces to capture Samuilova, southern part of Ivishenka, and Hill 221.3 region and subsequently attack toward Mkhovka to reach the front from the western end of the woods 1.5 kilometre southwest of Potapova to Vorotyshino, while cutting the Dukhovshchina-Iartsevo road at the road junction 1 kilometre south of Vorotyshino.

The Army artillery was ordered to fire a 15-minute preparation by 0800 hours, specifically to suppress German antitank guns and firing points along the front held by the 152nd, 38th, and 1st Tank Divisions. At 2000 Western Front put the best possible face on its overall failure. The 152nd, with the 35th Tanks, was reported as having driven the 761st and 400th Infantry Regiments back toward the north and northwest, capturing a line from the stream east of Samuilova as far as Marker 221.3 by 1530 before continuing its attack, but this was essentially the limit of 16th Army's success. The division was believed to have lost 30 percent of its strength in the offensive to date, or some 3,000 men.

The STAVKA insisted on continuing the offensive, in part in order to indirectly support 24th Army's Yelnya offensive, which seemed to be on the verge of success. 19th Army took the weight of this and by September 9 Rokossovskii was ordering the 38th and part of the 152nd to complete the capture of Hill 234.9 and Pervomaiskii village while the remainder of the 152nd was to fortify its positions while conducting reconnaissance. He was increasingly concerned about a concerted German attack. Timoshenko was of the same opinion, and at 1400 hours on September 10 he reported to the Operations Directorate that he would be withdrawing the 152nd and 64th Rifle Divisions, plus the 1st and 101st Tank Divisions into reserve, with the 152nd and 1st Tanks positioned in the Kakushkino region; the division would be relieved in its current positions by the 112th Rifle Division. In fact, the STAVKA had already decided to put Western Front on the defensive early that morning.

== Operation Typhoon ==
By the end of September the 152nd was part of the Front's small reserve group of three rifle divisions, three cavalry divisions, and two fortified regions. This was known as Group Boldin after its commander, Lt. Gen. I. V. Boldin. The STAVKA was convinced that a new German drive on Moscow, which was expected daily, would take place on the Vyazma axis, that is, the Warsaw–Minsk–Moscow highway. Therefore, Group Boldin was placed west of Vadino and Izdeshkovo with the intention to counterattack this direct blow along with 16th and 19th Armies. In the event the 3rd Panzer Group and 9th Army would strike at the boundary of 19th and 30th Armies, considerably farther north. 19th Army's intelligence reported that behind German lines in the Dukhovshchina area the local population was being forced to repair roads leading to the northeast, which also involved the construction of corduroy roads in swampy areas. Despite such information Western Front continued to reinforce the Vyazma axis. The 152nd crossed the Dniepr by ferry from the east to the west bank on September 29, and by 1300 hours was concentrating southeast of Safonovo.

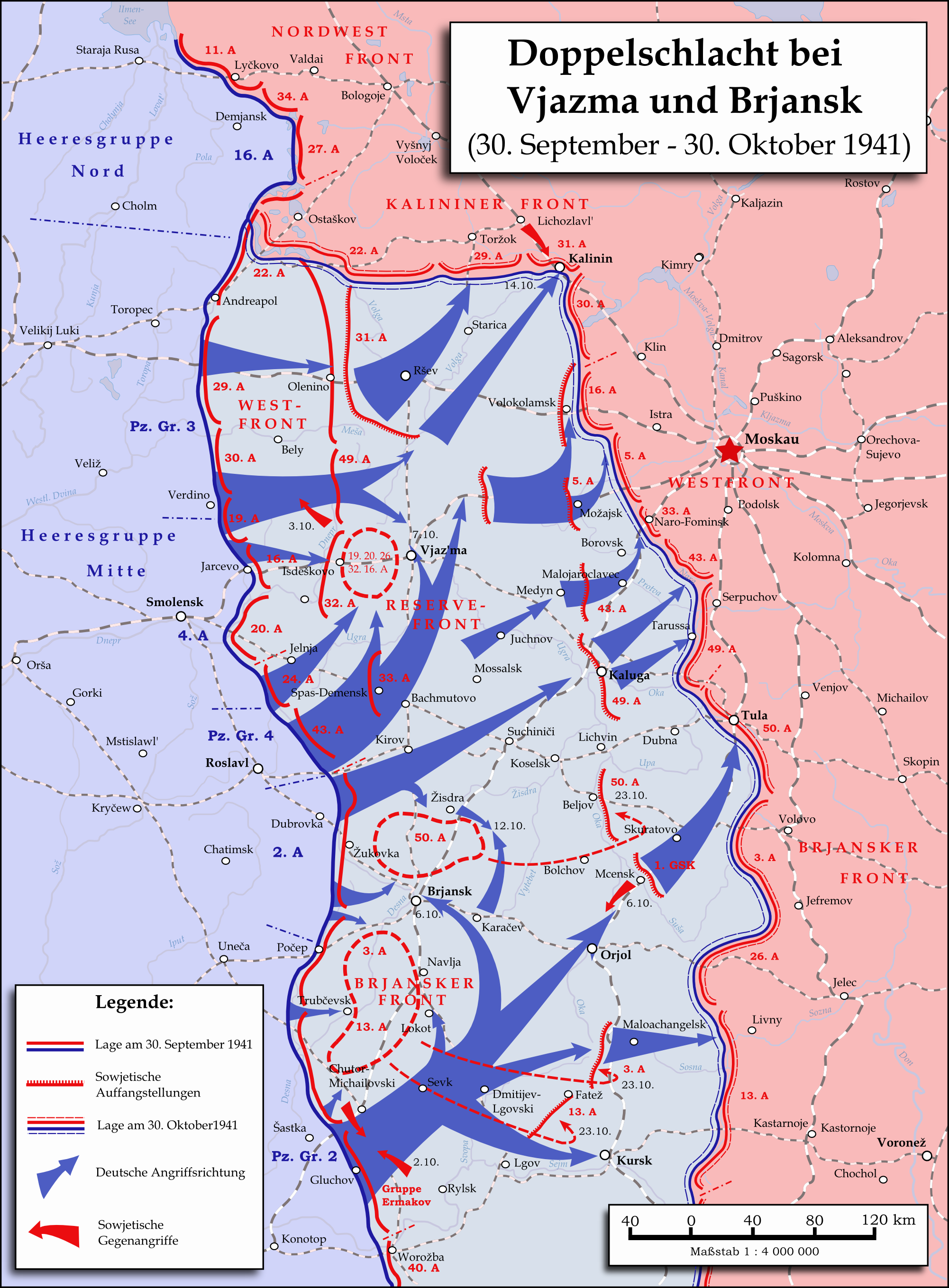
Operation Typhoon. Note counterattack marked "3.10." northwest of the Dniepr.

The northern thrust of Operation Typhoon began at 0530 hours on October 2, and the 19th/30th Army boundary was struck as the 30th Army commander expected. Overall, the Kaniutino axis was attacked by four German corps consisting of 12 divisions, including three panzer divisions (460–470 tanks) and one motorized division, simultaneously, and while Soviet resistance was fierce the outcome was not seriously in doubt, especially considering the continuing mild and dry weather. All this meant that Group Boldin was badly placed to intervene. General Konev, now in command of Western Front, resolved to stage a counterstroke against the penetration using Front reserves along with the 30th Army from the north and 19th Army from the south. Boldin ordered the formation of an operational group to consist of the 152nd and 251st Rifle Divisions, 45th Cavalry Division, 101st Motorized Division (formerly 101st Tank) and two tank brigades. This group was "to liquidate the enemy breakthrough on the Kaniutino axis and restore the 30th Army's position." The bulk of this force was located as far as 55km from the breakthrough area. The 152nd, with the 128th Tank Brigade, were ordered to move to an area 6-8km northwest of Kholm-Zhirkovskii and then prepare for joint operations. Konev had a poor understanding of the number of German tanks, believing that only 50-60 had penetrated his Front, and the 240 under Boldin would be adequate to the task. In addition, the 134th Rifle Division was 20km closer to this concentration area than the 152nd, but Konev declined to change Boldin's directives, as he considered it more important to keep the 134th on the Vyazma axis, which was still dominating Soviet thinking. In the event, German mobility completely disrupted Boldin's plans; by 1330 hours on October 3 the forward elements of 3rd Panzer Group were already fighting near Kaniutino Station.

While the Front's summary for this date stated that the 152nd, two tank brigades, and the 107th Motorized Rifle Division, alongside units of 30th Army, were fighting to eliminate the German penetrations on the Kaniutino axis, this was utterly mistaken. In fact, the main body of Group Boldin had only begun to move. 128th Tanks (with seven KV-1s, one T-34, 39 BT tanks, and 14 T-26s), advancing on a route that was believed to be clear, soon became engaged with German motorized infantry near Kholm-Zhirkovskii. By 1615 hours the advance units of the 152nd, following the tanks, were just arriving at Nikolo-Pogorelevo, 35km to the south, after covering 30km in six hours. The 101st Motorized traveled just 28km by 1600, with another 40km to its designated area, but was blocked by a motorized regiment near Tyukalovo. Boldin's command and control was compromised by only having two radio sets in his headquarters, forcing him to rely on messengers. The elements of his Group were fed into the fighting piecemeal along two routes 20-25km apart without lateral communications, and he was unable to create any superiority of force. The artillery of the rifle divisions lagged behind, leaving the tanks without fire support as they went into unexpected meeting engagements. V Army Corps expanded the breach in the Front's defenses with the goal of emerging on the flank of Group Boldin.

The deputy commander of Western Front reported at 1950 hours on October 4 that the 101st Motorized and 128th Tanks had retaken Kholm-Zhirkovskii. The men of the tank brigade had fought very well against 6th Panzer Division, throwing back three infantry/armor attacks, destroying five panzers and disabling 38 more, mostly with the KV-1s. The 152nd had attacked at noon toward the northwest and by 1700 was in an intense battle with German infantry and dug-in tanks south of the town on a front of 12km. The division failed to break through to the road leading to the Dniepr River bridges that had been seized by German forces, and was then counterattacked, forcing it back to the south. The following day it resumed its attack, now on a front of just 3km, and made a slow advance. By now it was clear that Boldin's counterattack had failed. It had begun too late, had too little artillery, German mobility was superior, and the Luftwaffe had command in the air. There was no longer any chance to restore the situation, and Chernyshev's remaining men would soon be fighting for survival.

=== Encirclement and breakout ===
On October 5 Konev ordered Boldin to maintain the defense of Kholm-Zhirkovskii with the 101st Motorized while attacking with the remainder of his Group against the German forces facing the 140th Rifle Division in order to restore the Dniepr line. In fact, the Group was too heavily engaged on its current lines. The situation was made worse by the lack of communications with 32nd Army. Under heavy counterattacks and bombing the 101st and 128th Tanks were forced out of the town. Boldin also reported in the morning of October 6 about the previous evening:

The 152nd Rifle Division at 20.00 after stubborn fighting broke into the settlement of Igor'evskoe [12km southwest of Kholm-Zhirkovskii] with one battalion and seized a significant amount of materiel, but enemy reserves came up and drove them out again. At 17.00 up to two enemy battalions launched a berserk attack, marching at full height to the playing of a band, but it was repulsed by machine gun and artillery fire that inflicted heavy casualties on the enemy.

He stated that for October 6 two regiments of the division, along with remnants of the 251st Rifle Division, would attack to take Igorevskaya Station while its remaining regiment would hold along the line Puchina–Verzha–Hill 232.6.

The German main encirclement was closed the next day near Vyazma. Under the circumstances the STAVKA decided to put all the encircled forces in the Vyazma area under one commander, and while Boldin was considered, Konev's choice fell on Lukin, likely due to his previous experience at Smolensk. He had already brought all his forces back over the Dniepr in preparation for a breakout, either toward Sychyovka or Gzhatsk. However, contact with Lukin was lost when his headquarters southwest of Vyazma came under attack at noon. Konev was forced to relay orders for the escape through 32nd Army, which was consolidated with 19th Army. Meanwhile, Lukin composed a report which was not received by the STAVKA until 1935 hours on October 11, in which he asked for the whereabouts of Group Boldin. Even in these first days the enveloped troops were running low on rations, fuel, and ammunition, and the aid stations and hospitals were filled with wounded. On October 8, Konev sent orders to 16th Army for an attack to retake Vyazma en route to a breakout which was to include Group Boldin, but the Group was still out of contact.

On October 9 at 1530 hours Lukin was able to reestablish contact with Konev and reported that he had met with Boldin the previous day at Aksentevo, and that:

[h]e has with him the 152nd Rifle Division, the 101st Motorized Rifle Division, and the 123rd, 128th and 147th Tank Brigades, up to 50 tanks altogether. The divisions are severely depleted. BOLDIN took command of the 210th and 140th Rifle Divisions from my army. He is withdrawing in three groups in the general direction of Gzhatsk.

6th and 7th Panzer Divisions, anticipating that Lukin would take the shortest path to break out, had built up defenses on the east side of the ring. As the lead elements of the Soviet columns struck these defenses and failed to penetrate, the main bodies were halted, and mostly fell apart. On the night of October 11/12 an ad hoc company which had been formed from staff officers of 19th Army was attached to the 152nd and this force was ordered to break out to the south in the direction of Vyazma, after the Army's battery of Guards mortars had been destroyed due to lack of ammunition. As soon as this southward movement was discovered, 9th Army went on the attack to disrupt the retreat. Despite this, several Soviet units managed the break through across the Minsk highway. By the end of October 12 most of the Vyazma pocket had been eliminated, although Boldin later led part of his Group to friendly lines in a northerly direction, but this was after the German screening force had been removed.

Only fragments of the 152nd emerged from the pocket, and on November 10 it was disbanded to provide replacements for other divisions in Western Front, although it officially remained on the books until December 27. Colonel Chernyshev survived and was immediately assigned to command of the 18th Rifle Division, which was redesignated as the 11th Guards Rifle Division on January 5, 1942. He would be promoted to the rank of major general on May 3, and reassigned to the 239th Rifle Division in late August. He held several other commands into the postwar period, and served from 1950 - 1956 as deputy commander of the Porkkala Naval Base, after which he retired. He died on March 11, 1966.

== 2nd Formation ==
The 430th Rifle Division began forming on December 23, 1941, at Krasnoufimsk in the South Ural Military District. On January 7, 1942, it was redesignated as the 2nd formation of the 152nd. Its order of battle was very similar to that of the 1st formation:

- 480th Rifle Regiment
- 544th Rifle Regiment
- 646th Rifle Regiment
- 333rd Artillery Regiment
- 257th Antitank Battalion
- 122nd Reconnaissance Company (later 102nd)
- 228th Sapper Battalion
- 220th Signal Battalion (later 220th Company)
- 274th Medical/Sanitation Battalion
- 212th Chemical Defense (Anti-gas) Platoon
- 154th Motor Transport Company (later 200th)
- 443rd Field Bakery
- 908th Divisional Veterinary Hospital
- 1666th Field Postal Station
- 1085th Field Office of the State Bank

Col. Grigorii Ivanovich Vekhin was appointed to command on January 4. He had begun the war as chief of staff of the 90th Rifle Division and most recently had led the 177th Rifle Division. He would be promoted to major general on January 27, 1943, while still in command of the 152nd. In February the 152nd began moving west and was assigned to the Reserve of the Supreme High Command. While in this command in March it was assigned to 58th Army, but as it finished forming up on April 7 it officially entered the fighting front when it came under command of 26th Army in Karelian Front.

=== Murmansk Offensive ===
On April 28 this Army began an offensive against the German XIX Mountain Corps. The 152nd was held in second echelon at Kem. The attack was poorly organized and failed with heavy losses before the division could be committed, but German forces did not have the strength to take advantage of their defensive success. On the same day the 14th Army had attacked from the Zapadnaya Litsa line toward Murmansk, facing the German-Finnish III Corps, although a broad flanking movement had begun five days earlier, but this also fared poorly. On April 30 the division was transferred to this Army as a reinforcement. At this time it had 11,370 personnel on strength, but they were not properly equipped for Arctic conditions. After crossing Kola Bay it embarked on an 80km march on a poor road toward the front. Heavy rain began on May 3, soon turning to a three-day blizzard. There was no shelter or fuel on the tundra and the troops had no relief from the cold and wet. 484 died of hypothermia and 1,683 suffered severe frostbite. The offensive was finally called off on May 11.

The 152nd remained in the high Arctic as part of 14th Army until February 1, 1943, when it re-entered the Reserve of the Supreme High Command and began moving far to the south. By March 2 it had been assigned to 6th Army in Southwestern Front.

== Drive for the Dniepr ==
On its arrival the division was assigned to the Army's 15th Rifle Corps. 6th Army had been caught up in von Manstein's "backhand blow" in February, encircled, and partly destroyed. In the first weeks of March the German armor turned north, retaking Kharkiv on March 15 and Belgorod three days later. This, and the start of the spring rasputitsa, left the badly mauled 6th Army clear to begin rebuilding east of the Donets River. In April the division was transferred to 34th Rifle Corps, still in 6th Army. On May 17, General Vekhin left the 152nd to take command of the 88th Guards Rifle Division and was replaced by Maj. Gen. Vasilii Petrovich Karuna. Vekhin later led the 350th Rifle Division and was made a Hero of the Soviet Union in May 1945. Karuna had previously led the 113th Cavalry Division and the 195th Rifle Division.

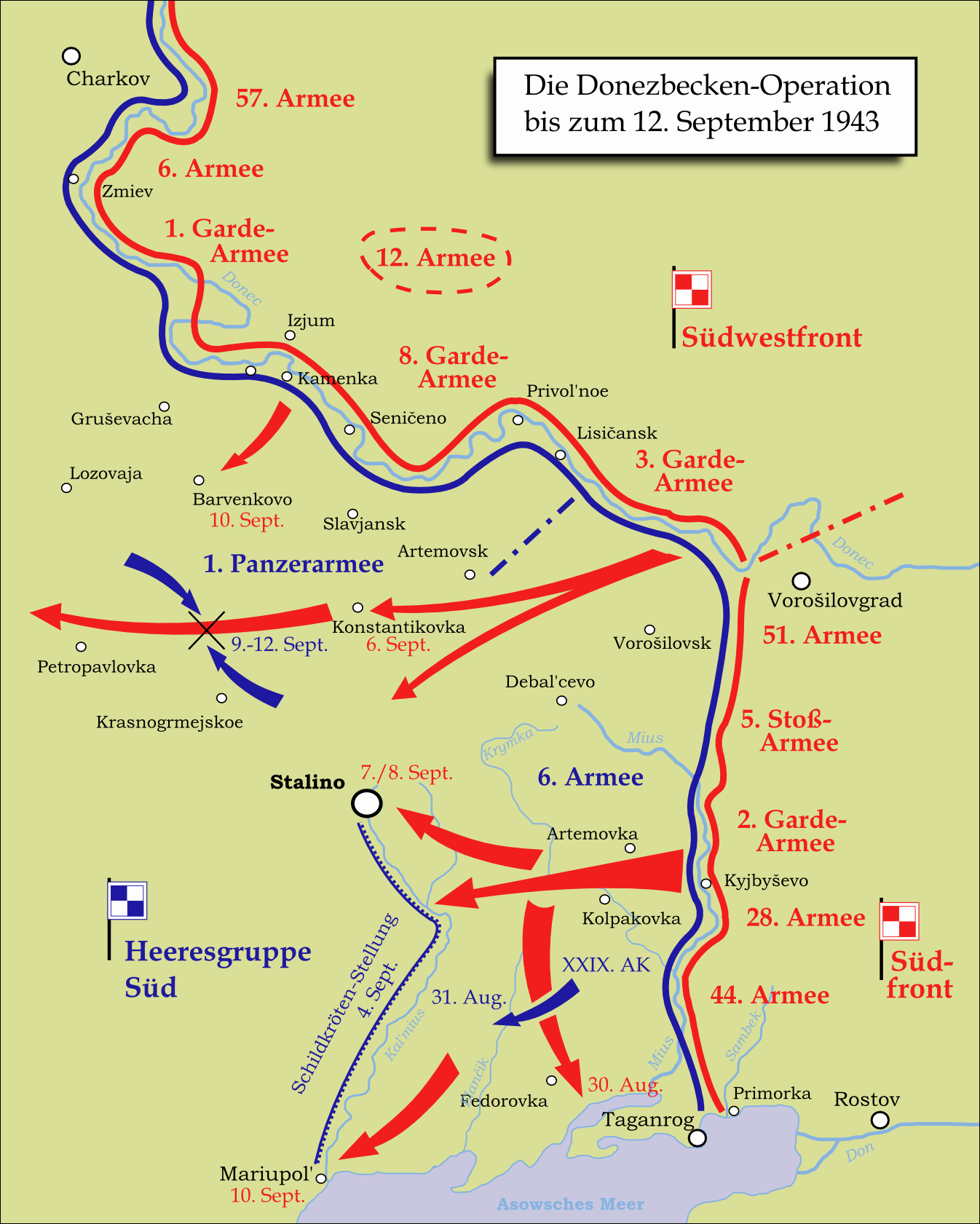
Map of the Donbas Offensive (in German)

By mid-August, following the Battle of Kursk and prior to the retaking of Kharkiv, 6th Army was located on the east bank of the Donets north of Izium. Elements of Southwestern and Southern Fronts had launched an abortive offensive against Army Group South in late July, but this had not involved 6th Army. This effort was expanded and renewed on August 13 on Southwestern Front's sector. The 1st Panzer Army held its line initially, despite artillery and mortar fire that led it to call for replacements within 48 hours. By August 23 it was reporting that the army corps south of Izium had been reduced to 5,800 men and could not hold a continuous line. The 152nd had crossed the Donets in the sector of Eskhar and Mokhnachi and was attacking the defenses around Zmiiv, 42km from Kharkiv. This helped to unhinge the defenses of that city as well, and it was evacuated on the same date. Later during the month the 34th Corps was reassigned to 1st Guards Army, still in the same Front.

On August 31, Field Marshal von Manstein authorized the 1st Panzer and 6th Armies to fall back to the Kalmius River. On the night of September 4, the two armies went into the Kalmius line, and the 6th Army commander declared there would be no more withdrawals. However, on the morning of September 6 a slashing attack by 1st Guards Mechanized Corps and nine rifle divisions utterly compromised the boundary between 6th and 1st Panzer Armies and the commander of the latter stated that there was no other recourse but to retreat to the Dniepr. On September 8, Hitler approved "in principle" their retreat to the Wotan position between Melitopol and the Dnieper north of Zaporizhzhia. At about this time the division was reassigned to the 6th Guards Rifle Corps of 1st Guards Army, still in the same Front. (3rd Ukrainian Front as of October 20.) As the pursuit of the defeated German forces continued the 152nd approached the Dniepr and overnight on September 26/27 was involved in heavy street fighting in Nizhni Dniprovske. The town was cleared by morning and forces of the division reached the river. In this fighting some 600 German troops were killed, wounded or captured, at a cost to the 152nd of 200 killed and wounded.

Over the next three days General Karuna led his men in preparations to force a crossing of the Dniepr. Rifle platoon exercises were carried out to form assault detachments and crossing methods using small boats were rehearsed. Battalion and company commanders met to discuss training manuals. Meanwhile, German artillery and mortar fire was constantly delivered on the division's positions. At 1530 hours on September 30, while on personal reconnaissance of the German positions on the far bank Karuna was severely wounded when a shell exploded just two metres away. He was quickly sent to a field hospital in Kulabovka, but he had suffered shell fragment wounds in his head, chest, and stomach, and both of his legs were broken; despite the best efforts of the doctors, he succumbed later that day. Deputy commander Col. Ignatii Gavrilovich Nesterenko led the division for several days until he resumed that post on October 6 with the arrival of Col. Pyotr Ivanovich Kulizhskii. This officer had previously led the 387th Rifle Division but had been the chief of the Front's combat training section for the past year. As the division continued its crossing preparations it returned to 34th Corps, which was now part of 46th Army of the same Front.

=== Across the Dniepr ===
One of the leaders of the crossing operation would be Sen. Lt. Georgii Alekseevich Yevstafiev, commander of the 102nd Reconnaissance Company. On the night of October 18/19 he led a group of his scouts over the Dniepr near the village of Diyevka, which is now within the city limits of Dnipro. The men located several German machine gun and mortar positions dug into the basements of houses, discovered the positions of artillery batteries, and reported the information to Kulizhskii's headquarters. The group was eventually discovered itself and hit by counterattacks, but managed to hold until reinforced. In the course of repelling one such attack Yevstafiev was severely concussed, but managed to remain on the battlefield. The intelligence obtained helped clear the way for the establishment of a full bridgehead over the coming days. On November 1 he was made a Hero of the Soviet Union, as were several other soldiers of the division, including Colonel Kulizhskii and Lt. Col. Konstantin Konstantinovich Lebedev, commander of the 646th Rifle Regiment. After establishing the bridgehead the division entered the fighting for Dnipro, which was cleared on October 25, and it received an honorific:

DNEPROPETROVSK - ...152nd Rifle Division (Colonel Kulizhskii, Pyotr Ivanovich)... The troops who participated in the liberation of Dnepropetrovsk and Dneprodzerzhinsk, by the order of the Supreme High Command of 25 October 1943, and a commendation in Moscow, are given a salute of 20 artillery salvoes from 224 guns.

On November 1, in recognition of its successful crossing operation, the division was also awarded the Order of the Red Banner.

=== Nikopol-Krivoi Rog Offensive ===
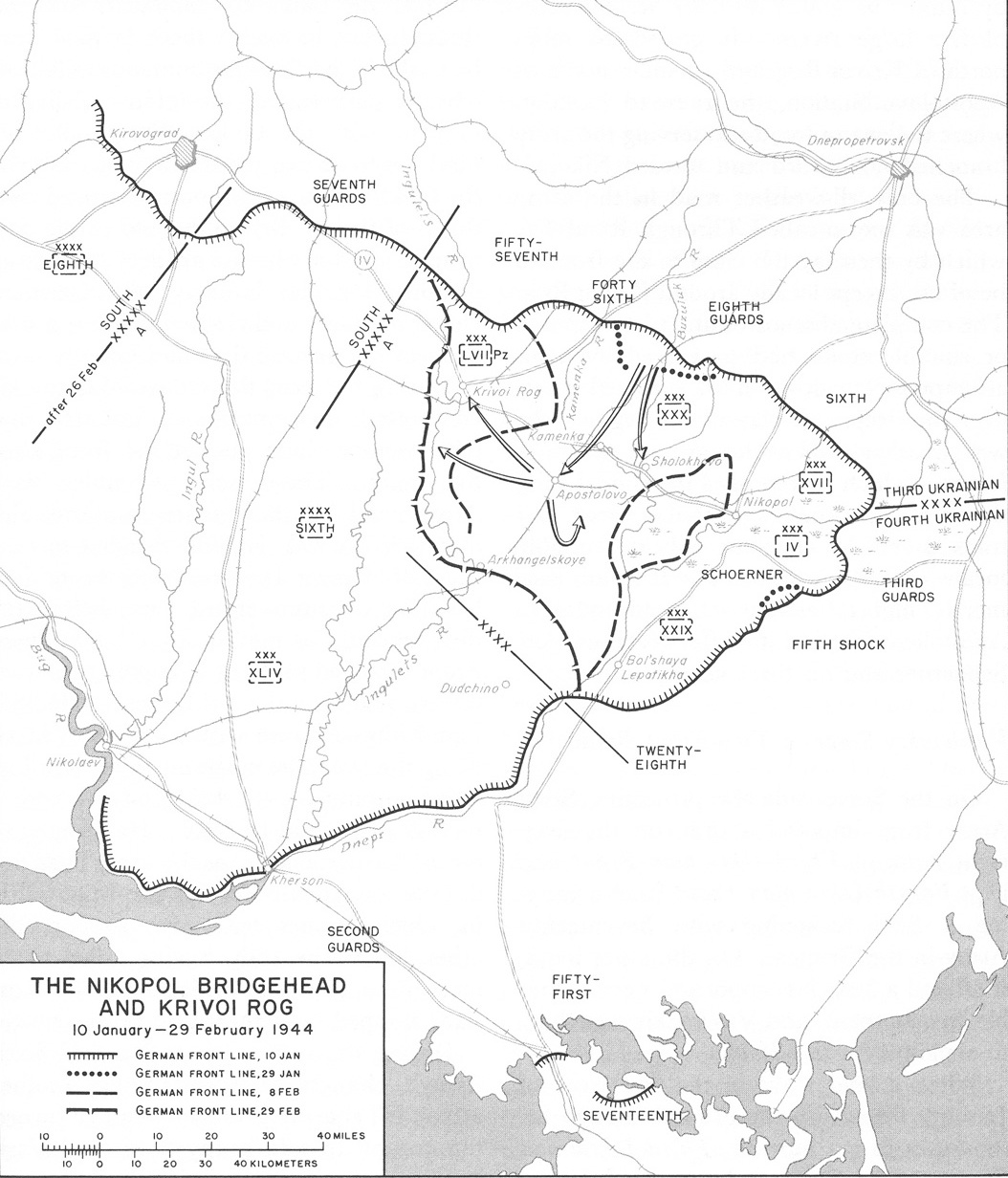
Nikopol-Krivoi Rog Offensive

3rd Ukrainian Front made its initial attempt to take Kryvyi Rih in December, but this proved abortive. Before the end of the month the division returned to 6th Guards Corps, which was now in 46th Army. On January 10, 1944, the Front launched an attack in part with 46th Army west of the Bazavluk River against German 6th Army holding out in the great bend of the Dniepr, but this miscarried when the Soviet infantry failed to keep up with the tanks. Further efforts over the next three days forced the front line back about 8km at considerable cost. The offensive was renewed on January 30 after a powerful artillery preparation against the positions of the German XXX Army Corps on the same sector of the line, but this was met with a counter-barrage that disrupted the attack. A new effort the next day, backed by even heavier artillery and air support, made progress but still did not penetrate the German line. By this time the 152nd was fighting under direct command of Army headquarters.

On February 1 the XXX Corps line was pierced in several places and by nightfall the Soviet forces had torn a 9km-wide gap in the line west of the Bazavluk. During the next two days German 6th Army tried to avoid encirclement by slogging through the mud to the Kamianka River line, which was already compromised by the Soviet advance. Forward detachments of 8th Guards Army reached Apostolove on the 4th and over the next few days 46th Army began to attempt a sweep westward to envelop Kryvyi Rih from the south. The dispersion of the Front's forces, combined with German reserves produced by the evacuation of the Nikopol bridgehead east of the Dnieper and indecision on the part of the German high command, produced "a peculiar sort of semiparalysis" on this part of the front during the second half of the month. Finally, on February 21 elements of the 46th and 37th Armies broke into the outer defenses of Kryvyi Rih. To avoid costly street fighting 6th Army was withdrawn west of the city, which was liberated the next day. At about this time the 152nd came under direct Front command.

=== Bereznegovatoye–Snigirevka Offensive ===
The commander of 3rd Ukrainian Front, Army Gen. R. Ya. Malinovskii, launched a new offensive against 6th Army on March 4. He threw a guards mechanized corps plus the three Guards rifle corps of 8th Guards Army against the German center and soon secured a foothold across the Inhulets River. By the third day the penetration had grown to a depth of 8km, allowing the 4th Guards Mechanized and 4th Guards Cavalry Corps to break loose and push straight through 40km to Novyi Buh, the headquarters 6th Army, causing considerable turmoil. On the night of March 11, Hitler ordered his 6th to end its retreat "at the latest" on the Southern Buh River.

In the second week of the month Malinovskii had enough strength gathered around Novyi Buh to strike due south into the Buh Liman at Mykolaiv and encircle the southern half of 6th Army or carry the offensive west to get across the Buh behind the entire 6th. The fact that he tried to do both ultimately saved the German force. 46th Army, almost entirely infantry, was sent west toward the Buh above Nova Odesa. The splitting of the Soviet forces allowed 6th Army to first fight its way through 8th Guards and then the 46th two days later. In addition, 8th Guards began to suffer supply difficulties, especially for its tanks, which delayed the drive for Mykolaiv. As a result, only three of the 6th Army's divisions had to break out of complete encirclement and by March 21 it had established a solid front on the Buh. During this fighting the 152nd was transferred to 8th Guards. Colonel Kulizhskii had left the division due to severe illness on March 16 and was replaced the next day by Col. Andriyan Timofeevich Kuzin, who had previously led the 39th and 74th Guards Rifle Divisions for brief periods. Kulizhskii would return in May as deputy commander of the 195th Rifle Division, and served in command of the 236th Rifle Division from June into the postwar, being promoted to major general on November 2, 1944.

==== Move to the north ====
On April 1 the 152nd again entered the Reserve of the Supreme High Command and began moving toward Belarus for the summer offensive against Army Group Center. By the beginning of May it had been assigned to Maj. Gen. P. F. Batitskii's 128th Rifle Corps of 28th Army, and it would remain under these commands for the duration of the war. When it reentered the fighting front on May 28 it was in 1st Belorussian Front.

== Operation Bagration ==
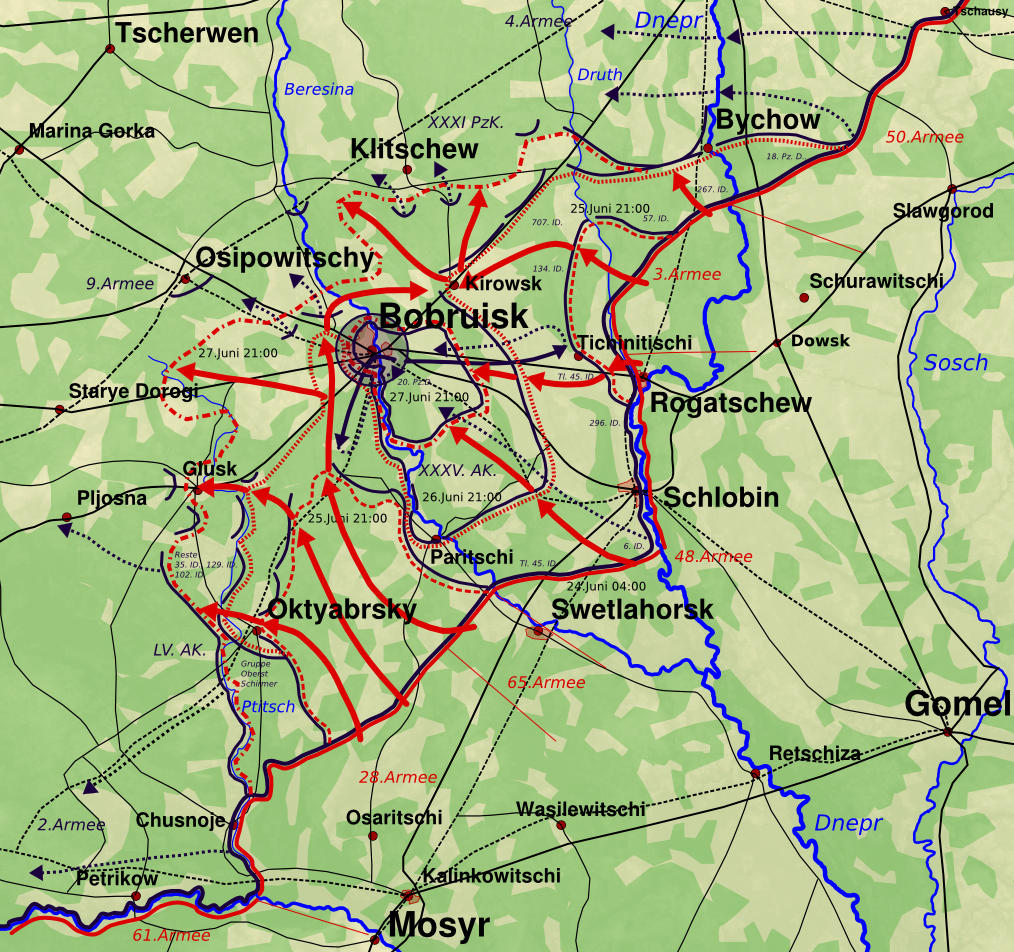
Babruysk Offensive. Note initial position of 28th Army north of Mazyr.

At the beginning of June the 128th Corps consisted of the 152nd, 61st and 130th Rifle Divisions. 28th Army was deployed at the corner of the Front's sector northwest of Mazyr, linking with the left-flank armies which stretched along the southern margins of the Pinsk Marshes. While those armies would mostly remain inactive in the first weeks the Front commander, General Rokossovskii, assigned the 28th an active role in the initial phase of the offensive in support of 65th Army's drive on Babruysk. The Army deployed all three of its corps in the first echelon with 128th Corps on a 4km-wide sector on the left in support of the 3rd Guards and 20th Rifle Corps. It would attack on a sector from Mostki to Yurki toward Grabe with the assistance of the 161st Fortified Region to its left.

During the first two days of the battle the Corps drove back the southern flank of the German 35th Infantry Division and together with elements of 65th Army advanced up to 10km on June 24, forcing the German division back towards the railroad south of Babruysk. On June 25 the 28th Army broke into the lines of the 35th and 129th Infantry Divisions in five places. The 129th Infantry, by now reduced to the size of a regiment, was forced to rotate to the west, leaving a gap on its corps' north flank. 128th Corps, with the 153rd Fortified Region, began to press the 292nd Infantry Division, which received orders at 1600 hours from Army Group to hold and bend back only on its northern flank. Meanwhile, the 18th Rifle Corps of 65th Army was scattering the remnants of 35th Infantry and widening the gap, which was entered by Cavalry Mechanized Group Pliev. 128th Corps and three fortified regions were held up along the Ptsich River on June 27, but the divisions of LV Army Corps were forced to abandon this line late in the day. By the evening of June 28 Pliev's 30th Cavalry Division reached the outskirts of Slutsk, as the rifle divisions of 28th Army were making their best speed to keep up with the advance of the mobile group. By June 30 German reinforcements were arriving, including elements of the 4th Panzer Division at Baranavichy which were sent to block the road to Slutsk. From June 22 to July 3 the 28th Army and the Pliev Group had forced a German retreat of 250km to the vicinity of Stowbtsy, but the advance now paused to bring up supplies to overcome the increasing resistance. On July 23 the 152nd would receive the Order of Suvorov, 2nd Degree, for its part in the liberation of the Minsk region.

=== Baranovichi-Slonim Operation ===
Resistance along the Baranavichy axis grew on July 4 as reinforcements continued to arrive, including the remainder of 4th Panzer, units of 12th Panzer Division that had broken through from Minsk, and the 1st Hungarian Cavalry Division moving up from Pinsk. 28th Army reached a line from Minkeviche to Kletsk to Rybaki. At this time Baranavichy was garrisoned by the 52nd Special Designation Security Division, a panzer battalion and three assault gun brigades. A defensive line was already being prepared along the Shchara River based on the town of Slonim. The Front was ordered, under STAVKA operational directive no. 220127, to immediately resume its advance on Baranavichy and subsequently to Brest with the 48th, 65th and 28th Armies; however the 28th was stretched out over a 25km line of march and was still 12km from its designated attack sector.

The Army commander, Lt. Gen. A. A. Luchinskii, directed his forces to outflank Baranavichy from the south on July 5, and by evening had liberated Lyakhavichy. Intensive fighting for Baranavichy took place on July 6–7. The line along the Shchara was penetrated but the Army advanced only a few kilometres. By the end of the second day the town was partially encircled but the Soviet advance was slowed by German reinforcements and continuing difficulties in bringing the Front's forces up to the attack sectors. Overnight the 65th Army, assisted by the 28th, stormed Baranavichy in an unexpected night attack which cleared it by 0400 hours on July 8 as the German forces withdrew to the west. By the end of the day the Army had advanced as far as Hantsavichy.

=== Lublin–Brest Offensive ===
The 28th Army continued making its main offensive in the direction of Kosava and Smolyanitsa and by July 13 had reached the Yaselda River along its entire front. At this point it encountered much stiffer resistance from the newly arrived 102nd Infantry Division and the 5th Hungarian Reserve Division. It fell to the 1st Mechanized Corps to pierce this line and allow the advance to continue.

The operation to liberate Brest began on July 17. The Front's main attack would be made by its left-flank armies with the right-flank forces in support; 28th Army on the right with 61st Army and the Pliev Group were to outflank the city from the north and northwest, encircle and capture it. The attack began with a 15-20 minute artillery preparation. 28th Army, with the Pliev Group, directed their advances towards Kamyenyets, and by the end of the day had covered 25km. After beating off numerous German counterattacks the next day the Army forced the Lesnaya River east of Dmitrovichi and linked up with 61st Army. From July 19 Army Group Center began heavy counterattacks against the Army and the Pliev Group in order to continue its hold on Brest, and these would continue until the 21st. The commitment of 20th Rifle Corps from second echelon in the direction of the railroad to Brest along the Army's left flank during the second half of July 20 allowed the offensive to gain momentum and the German forces began to withdraw towards the city. During July 25–26 the Army forced the Lesnaya north of Czernawczyci and General Rokossovskii handed over his reserve 46th Rifle Corps to help complete the encirclement. This was done on July 27 and beginning after midnight on the 28th the Army drove into the fortified zone from the north, throwing off counterattacks, and linked up with 9th Guards Rifle Corps of 61st Army and the main forces of 70th Army. The city was cleared later that day.

== Into Germany ==
On September 14 the 152nd again entered the Reserve of the Supreme High Command along with the rest of 28th Army and redeployed to the border of East Prussia where it joined 3rd Belorussian Front on October 13. On October 21 the Army was committed to the Goldap-Gumbinnen operation but its advance was halted near Ebenrode by German counterattacks. Following this the Front began preparations for the winter offensive into Poland and Germany. In a December report the personnel of the division were listed as 60 percent Bukovinian, 30 percent Ukrainian, and ten percent Russian. In a report on January 1, 1945, the 154th Motor Transport Company listed its current strength:

- 100 men with 42 vehicles, including:
  - 14 old Soviet GAZ and ZIS trucks that "needed repair after every trip"
  - 9 US Lend Lease trucks (5 1.5t Dodge, 4 2.5t Studebaker or GMC)
  - 13 new Soviet trucks
  - 4 captured German or French trucks
  - 2 captured German halftracks

As of the same date the 128th Corps still had the same three divisions under command.

=== East Prussian Offensives ===
In the planning for the Vistula-Oder Offensive the Front organized its shock group into two echelons with the 39th, 5th and 28th Armies in the first, backed by the 11th Guards Army and two tank corps. The 28th Army had its main forces on its right flank and was to launch a vigorous attack north of the Ebenrode–Gumbinnen paved highway in the general direction of Insterburg. Its breakthrough frontage was 7km wide and its immediate objective was to destroy the Gumbinnen group of German forces in conjunction with 5th Army before assisting 11th Guards in its deployment along the Inster River. The Army deployed a total of 1,527 guns and mortars on this frontage with the 3rd Guards Corps, which was to launch the main attack, given the largest allocation.

3rd Belorussian Front began its part of the offensive on the morning of January 13. The Army, mainly facing the 549th Volksgrenadier Division, broke through the defense along the Kischen–Grunhaus sector and penetrated as much as 7km by the day's end while fighting off 14 counterattacks by infantry and tanks. On the next three days the advance slowed considerably as the German forces continued to cover the routes to Gumbinnen. By now it was apparent to the Front commander, Army Gen. I. D. Chernyakhovskii, that the breakthrough would not come on this sector and he moved his second echelon to the 39th Army's front. On January 19 the Army began to advance more successfully. General Luchinskii concentrated the maximum amount of artillery fire in support of the 3rd Guards and 128th Corps allowing a breakthrough on a narrow sector towards the northeastern outskirts of Gumbinnen. Meanwhile, 20th Corps reached the town from the south, but the German grouping continued to resist and the Army's units were forced to consolidate. On the same day Colonel Kuzin was forced to leave the 152nd for health reasons and would remain hospitalized for the duration. He was replaced by Col. Grigorii Leontevich Rybalka, who had previously led both the 54th and 50th Guards Rifle Divisions. He would remain in command into peacetime.

During a two-day battle on January 20–21 the 20th and 128th Corps finally captured Gumbinnen. A stubborn battle for Insterburg followed the next day, and for its contribution to the victory the 480th Rifle Regiment (Lt. Col. Belyaev, Vasilii Kharitonovich) was awarded its name as an honorific.

A large remnant of the German forces managed to retreat to the Angerapp River, which the 28th Army reached by the end of January 22. By 2300 hours on January 23 it became apparent that the German forces facing the Army were in retreat to the west. Over the next two days the Army advanced up to 35km and reached a line from Kortmedin to Gerdauen by the end of the 26th, less than 70km southeast of Königsberg. The 128th and 3rd Guards Corps took Gerdauen overnight on January 27/28 while the remainder of the Army advanced to the Alle River where it was halted by heavy fire from a well-established defensive line along the west bank. It was now clear that Königsberg would soon be isolated. On February 10 the town of Preußisch Eylau was captured and two of the division's subunits would be honored for their roles on April 5. The 646th Rifle Regiment was awarded the Order of Bogdan Khmelnitsky, 3rd Degree, and the 333rd Artillery Regiment received the Order of Kutuzov, 3rd Degree.

==== Heiligenbeil Pocket ====
After six weeks of almost continuous fighting, by the beginning of March the divisions of 3rd Belorussian Front were significantly understrength. Despite this the Front ordered a new operation to eliminate the remaining German forces southwest of the Königsberg fortified zone. The new offensive began on March 13, with 28th Army attacking in the direction of Bladiau, which was taken on March 15. During the night of March 25/26 the Army, in cooperation with 31st Army, stormed the town of Rosenberg and advanced towards Balga, capturing 6,200 soldiers, 25 tanks and 220 guns of various calibres. Immediately after the operation ended on March 29 the 28th was again transferred to the Reserve of the Supreme High Command and began moving across eastern Germany towards the Oder River. On April 26 the 152nd would be decorated with the Order of Lenin, a rare distinction for a regular rifle division, in recognition of its role in the fighting for the Heiligenbeil Pocket. On the same date several units of the division would be rewarded for the taking of Heiligenbeil itself: the 480th and 544th Rifle Regiments each received the Order of Kutuzov, 3rd Degree, while the 228th Sapper Battalion and 220th Signal Battalion were both given the Order of the Red Star.

=== Berlin Operation ===
By April 20 the 152nd had arrived in the 1st Ukrainian Front. The battle for the Oder and Neisse Rivers began on April 16 but 28th Army's leading divisions did not arrive at the front and begin combat operations until April 22. The next day the 152nd and 130th were committed from reserve to complete the ring of encirclement around German 9th Army and were soon fighting along a line from Tornow to Ragow, facing east. By day's end only one route, the Neumuhle–Buckow road, connected 9th Army with Berlin, and it was under Soviet artillery fire. The inner encirclement ring was completed on April 25 when the 152nd joined hands at noon with 3rd Army's 2nd Guards Cavalry Corps in the area of Rotzis and Brusendorf.

During April 26 the 152nd and 130th remained on a line from Lübben to Krausnick to outside Teupitz, containing the trapped German forces, which were confined to an area not more than 900km^{2}. The next day breakout attempts continued, particularly in the Halbe area. Much of this fell on the 3rd Guards Corps. Under orders from the Front commander, Marshal Konev, the 152nd was pulled out of the Mittenwalde–Brusendorf line and sent north toward Lichtenrade for joint operations with 3rd Guards Tank Army, which had earlier helped seal the encirclement of Berlin itself. On April 28, along with the 61st Division, it began reaching the southern part of the city.

The next day the 152nd completed its arrival in the area of Halensee and Westkreuz station to back up the 23rd Guards Motorized Rifle Brigade of 7th Guards Tank Corps. By the end of April 30 the division, now in cooperation with 9th Mechanized Corps of 3rd Guards Tanks, reached a line from Lietzenburger Strasse to Ludwigsplatz against waning resistance. At 2330 hours the organization of the German surrender of Berlin began although fighting continued into May 1, as 28th Army and 3rd Guards Tanks cleared about 90 blocks. The surrender finally came at 0700 on May 2.

== Postwar ==
When the shooting stopped the men and women of the division shared the full title of 152nd Rifle, Dnepropetrovsk, Order of Lenin, Order of the Red Banner, Order of Suvorov Division. (Russian: 152-я стрелковая Днепропетровская ордена Ленина Краснознамённая ордена Суворова дивизия.) A final distinction was awarded on June 4 when the 480th Regiment received the Order of Alexander Nevsky for its role in the fighting for Berlin.

Shortly after this the division began moving back to Soviet territory. In January Colonel Rybalka handed his command to Maj. Gen. Vasilii Ilich Baklakov, a Hero of the Soviet Union who had previously led the 218th Rifle Division. As of July 1 it was still in 128th Corps, which was now part of 3rd Army in Byelorussian Military District. It was at Byaroza on February 18, 1947, when it was disbanded with the rest of the Corps.
