= 48th Guards Rifle Division =

48th Guards Rifle Division (October 20, 1942 – 1946)
- Active: 1942–1946
- Country: Soviet Union
- Branch: Red Army
- Type: Division
- Role: Infantry
- Engagements: Ostrogozhsk–Rossosh Offensive; Third Battle of Kharkov; Donbass Strategic Offensive (August 1943); Poltava-Kremenchug Offensive; Nikopol–Krivoi Rog Offensive; Operation Bagration; Bobruysk Offensive; Baranovichi-Slonim Offensive; Lublin–Brest Offensive; Goldap-Gumbinnen Operation; Vistula-Oder Offensive; East Prussian Offensive; Heiligenbeil Pocket; Battle of Berlin; Prague Offensive
- Decorations: Order of the Red Banner; Order of Suvorov; Order of Kutuzov
- Battle honours: Krivoi Rog

Commanders
- Notable commanders: Maj. Gen. Nikolai Matveevich Makovchuk; Maj. Gen. Gelb Nikolaevich Korchikov

The 48th Guards Rifle Division was formed as an elite infantry division of the Red Army in October 1942, based on the 2nd formation of the 264th Rifle Division, and served in that role until after the end of the Great Patriotic War. It was in the 3rd Tank Army when it formed but this force was badly damaged in Army Group South's counteroffensive south of Kharkov in March 1943 and the division had to be withdrawn for a substantial rebuilding in 57th Army of Southwestern Front during the spring. It remained in the south of Ukraine into early 1944, mostly in either that or the 37th Army, and won a battle honor in the process. It was then removed to the Reserve of the Supreme High Command for another rebuilding before returning to the front in May 1944 and joining the 28th Army, where it remained for the duration of the war. Taking part in the summer offensive in Belarus the 48th Guards was awarded the Order of the Red Banner and several of its subunits also received decorations or distinctions. In January 1945 the division fought into East Prussia and assisted in the fighting southwest of the city/fortress of Königsberg before 28th Army was redeployed westward to take part in the Berlin operation. By now it was part of 1st Ukrainian Front and spent the last days of the war advancing on Prague. During the summer it was reassigned to the Belorussian Military District. The division was converted to the 38th Guards Rifle Brigade in 1946, but reformed as a new 48th Guards Rifle Division in 1949.

== Formation ==
The 48th Guards officially received its Guards title on October 20. It would receive its banner on December 17 from the commander of 3rd Tank Army, Major General Pavel Rybalko, and its subunits would be redesignated on December 26; at this point the division's order of battle was as follows:

- 138th Guards Rifle Regiment (from 1056th Rifle Regiment)
- 143rd Guards Rifle Regiment (from 1058th Rifle Regiment)
- 146th Guards Rifle Regiment (from 1060th Rifle Regiment)
- 98th Guards Artillery Regiment
- 53rd Guards Antitank Battalion (53rd Guards Self-Propelled Artillery Battalion as of May 9, 1944)
- 67th Guards Antiaircraft Battery (until April 25, 1943)
- 58th Guards Machine Gun Battalion (until July 1, 1943)
- Separate rifle training company (as of May 28, 1944)
- 47th Guards Reconnaissance Company
- 53rd Guards Sapper Battalion
- 74th Guards Signal Battalion
- 54th Guards Medical/Sanitation Battalion
- 50th Guards Chemical Defense (Anti-gas) Company
- 52nd Guards Motor Transport Company
- 49th Guards Field Bakery
- 46th Guards Divisional Veterinary Hospital
- 1630th Field Postal Station
- 1620th Field Office of the State Bank

Col. Nikolai Matveevich Makovchuk remained in command of the division after redesignation; he had commanded the 264th throughout its 2nd formation and would be promoted to the rank of major general on November 10. The redesignation took place when 3rd Tank Army was in the Reserve of the Supreme High Command after having been removed from the south flank of Western Front. On October 25 the division boarded trains at Sukhinichi and began moving to the Tula area where it remained until December 20 undergoing rebuilding and training of its personnel. By the beginning of January 1943 the 48th Guards rejoined 3rd Tank Army in Voronezh Front just prior to the start of the Ostrogozhsk–Rossosh Offensive. 3rd Tank still had the early mixed tank army composition with two rifle divisions, the other being the 184th.

== Third Battle of Kharkov ==
The Army was concentrated just north of Kantemirovka when the offensive began on January 13. It was facing elements of the Italian 8th Army, which had already been shattered during Operation Little Saturn, and the XXIV Panzer Corps. The advance made good progress and the Front commander, Col. Gen. N. F. Vatutin, reported that 3rd Tank had captured the Valuyki and Urazovo regions in Belgorod Oblast by January 19. On February 8 the Front's 60th Army liberated Kursk and the German 2nd Army appeared to be in full retreat. 3rd Tank, currently south of Kharkov, was ordered on February 16 to exploit towards Poltava. However, on February 19 Field Marshal E. von Manstein launched his counteroffensive towards the former city and had soon thrown the forces of Voronezh Front into confusion. On the last day of the month the Army was transferred to Southwestern Front, and was ordered to swing 90 degrees from the Poltava axis to counterattack the SS Panzer Corps. After more than a month of near constant fighting 3rd Tank was woefully under-strength, suffering from shortages of equipment, fuel and ammunition and had a total of fewer than 80 operational tanks. On March 1 the Army advanced south into the Kegichevka region and soon encountered three converging panzer divisions, with predictable results. Between March 3–5 the SS Corps and the arriving XXXXVIII Panzer Corps "completely demolished" the two tank corps and the supporting rifle divisions of 3rd Tank, forced the survivors back towards Kharkov and advanced to within 32 km of the city, which fell by March 16.

Shortly after taking Belgorod on the 17th the German offensive ground to a halt in part due to the spring rasputitsa, giving the Red Army survivors a respite to regroup and rebuild. As of the beginning of April the 48th Guards was still in 3rd Tank Army in Southwestern Front, east of the Donets, but later that month it was reassigned to the new 27th Guards Rifle Corps of 57th Army, still in the same Front. It would remain under these commands into July. On May 27 General Makovchuk took command of the 34th Guards Rifle Corps and three days later he handed command of the division to Col. Leonid Ivanovich Vagin. As it replenished its forces the division was noted in June as having 80 percent of its personnel of various Asian nationalities, but a month later the breakdown was reported as 40 percent Russian, 30 percent Ukrainian, and 30 percent Turkmen.

== Into Ukraine ==
On July 2 Colonel Vagin gave over his command to Col. Gelb Nikolaevich Korchikov. Vagin would go on to command the 79th Guards Rifle Division, be promoted to the rank of major general, and was made a Hero of the Soviet Union in April 1945. Korchikov was also promoted to major general on March 19, 1944, and led the division into the postwar period when it was reorganized as the 38th Guards Rifle Brigade. Later in July the 27th Guards Corps was transferred to the 6th Army, still in Southwestern Front, at the start of the second Donbass Strategic Offensive. This began on August 13, following the German defeat at Kursk, and the 48th Guards took part in forcing the Donets and assisting Steppe Front in the final liberation of Kharkov. Later that month the division was reassigned to the 76th Rifle Corps, which was in the Steppe Front's reserves. Meanwhile, on August 7 the 98th Guards Artillery Regiment had been recognized for its service with the award of the Order of the Red Banner.

At the beginning of September the 48th Guards was again marching towards Poltava, but on the 6th the STAVKA redirected Steppe Front's main thrust in the direction of Kremenchug on the Dniepr. During the summer offensive Sen. Sgt. Vasilii Yakovlevich Petrov, commander of the reconnaissance platoon of the 146th Guards Rifle Regiment, distinguished himself. Under his leadership the platoon staged a series of raids behind German lines which gained 20 prisoners for interrogation, killed or wounded as many as 100 German soldiers and officers and gained much valuable information. On December 20 Petrov would be made a Hero of the Soviet Union; he would later be killed in action at Gumbinnen on November 25, 1944. As the Front approached the Dniepr the division returned to 57th Army although it was not immediately assigned to a corps.

=== Battle for the Dniepr ===
On September 26 forces of Steppe Front made three assault crossings between Kermenchug and Dnepropetrovsk, which were merged over the next few days to form a single lodgement 50 km wide and up to 16 km deep. In the bridgehead fighting that followed three more non-commissioned officers of the 48th Guards would become Heroes of the Soviet Union on December 20. Sen. Sgt. Pyotr Akimovich Kravets was the commander of a gun crew of the 98th Guards Artillery Regiment that made an assault crossing into the bridgehead north of Dnepropetrovsk on October 3. Three days later he directed the fire of his gun during a heavy German counterattack and accounted for four tanks, two assault guns and two machine guns. In total he and his crew destroyed seven tanks, three assault guns and several more machine guns and artillery pieces in the bridgehead. Sen. Sgt. Nikolai Petrovich Pustyntsev was the director of intelligence of the 47th Guards Reconnaissance Company. During the summer offensive he had been responsible for the capture of four prisoners for interrogation. On October 17 he led a party into the German rear and discovered well-concealed artillery positions. He then contacted the divisional artillery by radio and called in accurate fire that destroyed 12 guns, seven mortars, two armored vehicles and a large number of personnel. Pustyntsev survived the war and went on to write his memoirs. Sen. Sgt. Nikolai Kulba had volunteered for the Red Army in August 1942 after being convicted for robbery in 1941. By the spring of 1943 he was in the 146th Guards Rifle Regiment and was recognized as one of the division's best snipers, with 29 kills. In the early fighting for the bridgehead he took command of his company after its commander was wounded and led it in a successful attack on the Rogan height, despite his own wound. On October 27, in a battle for the Zhovtnevo farm, he destroyed a German machine gun position with grenades despite being wounded again in the process. He had been in hospital until sometime before his award was approved, but disappeared before it could be awarded. Kulba was not finally tracked down until 1958, due to his use of a different patronymic, and the Soviet Army authorities found he had been convicted of two more crimes, including rape. On July 1, 1959 Kulba was deprived of all ranks and awards.

During October the division was assigned to the 64th Rifle Corps, still in 57th Army in the renamed 2nd Ukrainian Front. On October 15 the Front had broken out of the larger of its bridgeheads with 12 rifle divisions and over the next few days the forces of three armies plus the 5th Guards Tank Army crossed the Dniepr and tore into the left flank of 1st Panzer Army. The important rail hub of Pyatikhatka was liberated on October 18 cutting the line from Dnepropetrovsk to Krivoi Rog and the latter city was the Front's next objective. On October 24 von Manstein transferred the XXXX Panzer Corps to 8th Army on the northern flank of the Soviet thrust but this was still deploying when 2nd Ukrainian's lead elements reached the outskirts of Krivoi Rog the next day. The German counterattack began on the 27th and over the course of three days caused significant destruction to the overstretched Soviet forces, driving them back some 30 km. Until mid-December they rebuilt while carrying on attritional warfare with the two German armies. During November the 48th Guards returned to 27th Guards Corps, still in 57th Army.

=== Nikopol-Krivoi Rog Offensive ===
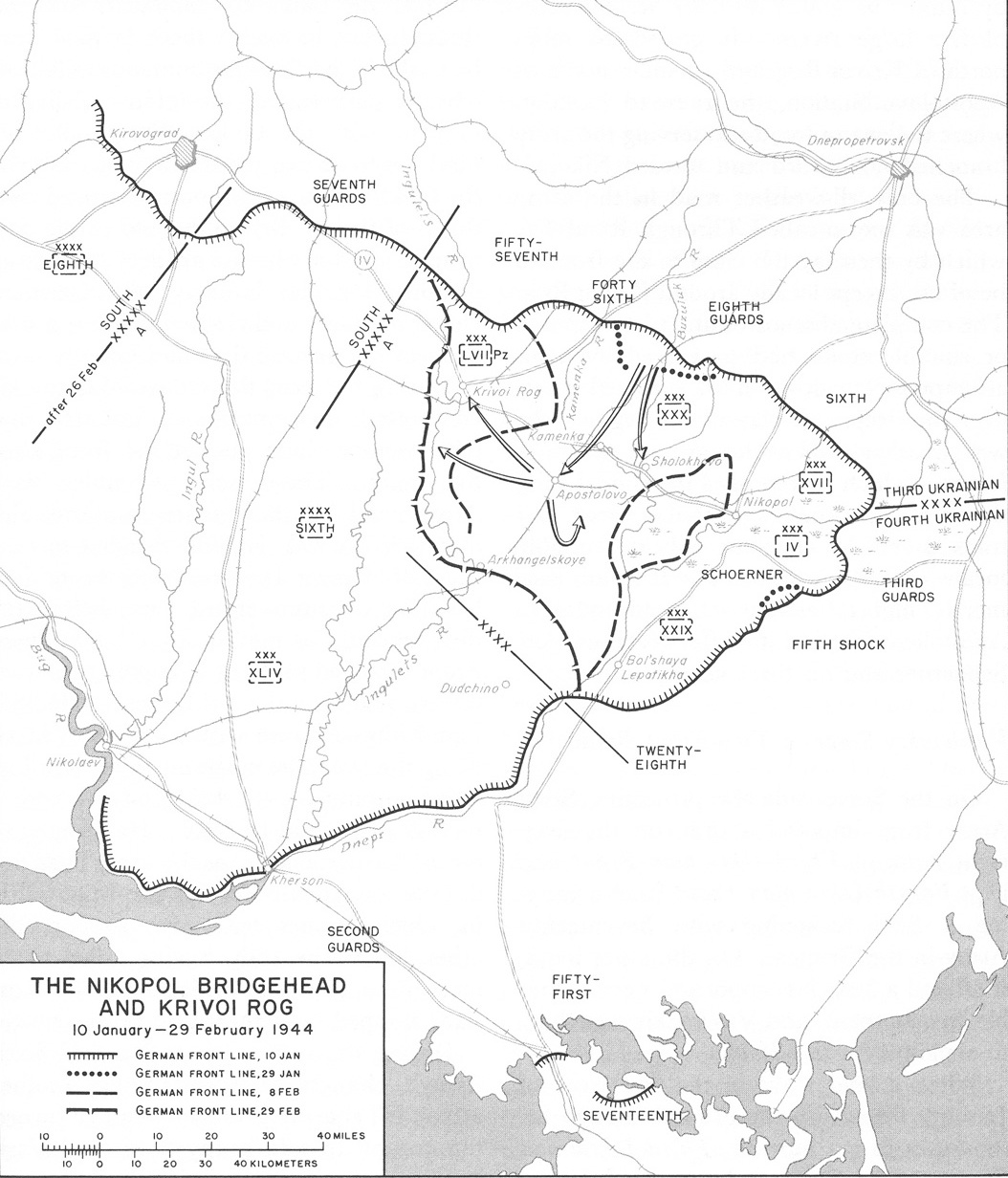
Nikopol-Krivoi Rog Offensive

In December the 27th Guards Corps was reassigned to 37th Army, still in 2nd Ukrainian Front, but in the new year this Army was transferred to 3rd Ukrainian Front while the division was moved to the 57th Rifle Corps. The Front's first effort to renew the drive on Krivoi Rog began on January 10, led mainly by 46th Army, but made only modest gains at considerable cost and was halted on the 16th. The offensive was renewed on January 30 after a powerful artillery preparation against the positions of the German XXX Army Corps on the same sector of the line, but this was met with a counter-barrage that disrupted the attack. A new effort the next day, backed by even heavier artillery and air support, made progress but still did not penetrate the German line.

On February 1 the XXX Corps line was pierced in several places and by nightfall the Soviet forces had torn a 9 km-wide gap in the line west of the Buzuluk River. During the next two days German 6th Army tried to avoid encirclement by slogging through the mud to the Kamianka River line, which was already compromised by the Soviet advance. Forward detachments of 8th Guards Army reached Apostolovo on the 4th and over the next few days 46th Army began to attempt a sweep westward to envelop Krivoi Rog from the south. The dispersion of the Front's forces, combined with German reserves produced by the evacuation of the Nikopol bridgehead east of the Dniepr and indecision on the part of the German high command, produced "a peculiar sort of semiparalysis" on this part of the front during the second half of the month. During this period the 48th Guards was transferred to the 34th Rifle Corps of 46th Army. Finally, on February 21 elements of the 46th and 37th Armies broke into the outer defenses of Krivoi Rog. To avoid costly street fighting 6th Army was withdrawn west of the city, which was liberated the next day. The division was given a battle honor for its part in this action:

"KRIVOI ROG... 48th Guards Rifle Division (Colonel Korchikov, Gleb Nikolaevich)... The troops who participated in the liberation of Krivoi Rog, by the order of the Supreme High Command of 22 February 1944, and a commendation in Moscow, are given a salute of 20 artillery salvoes from 224 guns."

Shortly after this victory, following eight months of continuous offensive across the Donbass, Ukraine, and the Dniepr River the division was withdrawn to the Reserve of the Supreme High Command to recover. While there it was assigned to the 28th Army and it would remain under that command for the duration of the war. In May it became one of the first Red Army divisions to have the 45mm antitank guns of its antitank battalion replaced with 12 SU-76 self-propelled guns.

== Operation Bagration ==
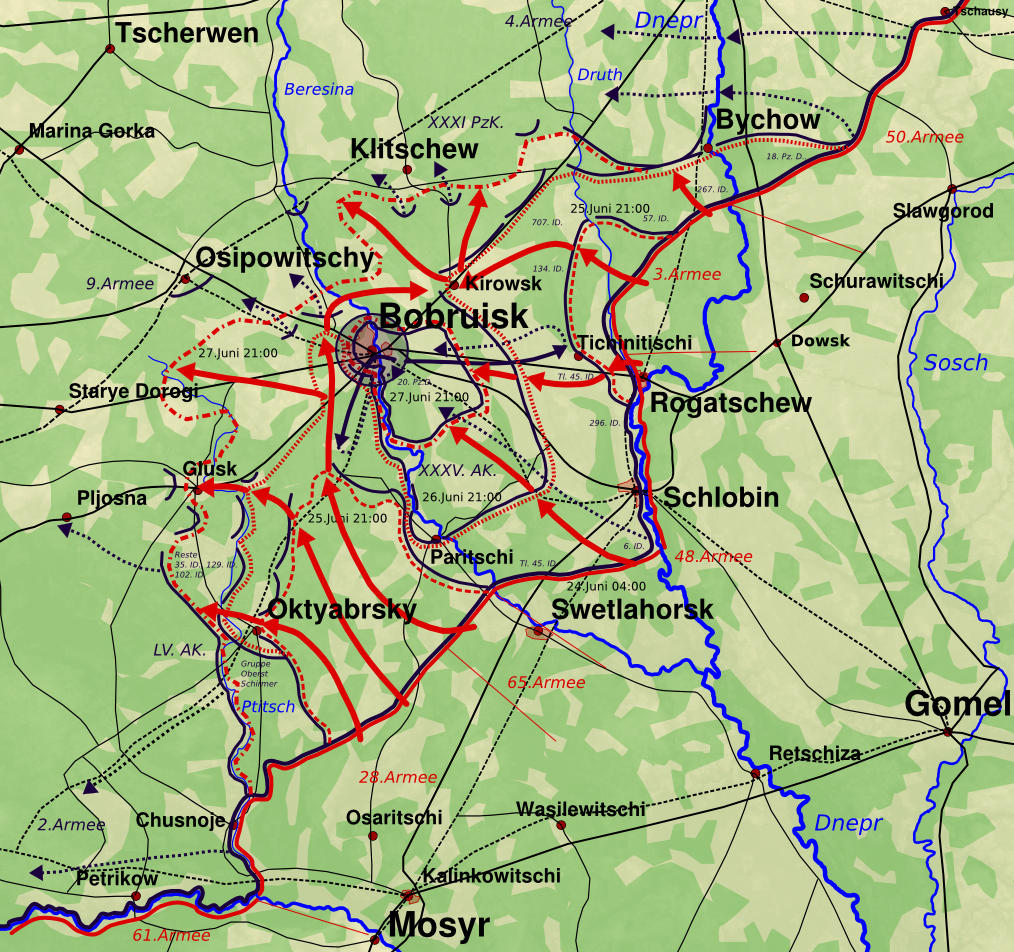
Bobryusk Offensive. Note initial position of 28th Army north of Mozyr.

In April the division was assigned to the 20th Rifle Corps, with the 55th Guards and 20th Rifle Divisions. It would remain in this Corps, with these divisions, for the duration. When the Army returned to the front it joined the center of 1st Belorussian Front, at the corner northwest of Mozyr, linking with the left-flank armies which stretched along the southern margins of the Pripyat Marshes. While those armies would mostly remain inactive in the first weeks the Front commander, Army Gen. K. K. Rokossovskii, assigned the 28th an active role in the initial phase of the summer offensive in support of 65th Army's drive on Bobryusk. The Army deployed all three of its corps in the first echelon with 20th Corps on a 5 km-wide sector in the center. During the first two days of the battle the Army pressured the flanks of the German 35th and 129th Infantry Divisions, forcing them back towards the railroad south of Bobruysk.

On June 25 the 28th Army broke into the lines of the two German divisions in five places. The 129th Infantry, by now reduced to the size of a regiment, was forced to rotate to the west, leaving a gap on its corps' north flank. Meanwhile, the 18th Rifle Corps of 65th Army was scattering the remnants of 35th Infantry and widening the gap, which was entered by Cavalry Mechanized Group Pliev. By the evening of June 28 Pliev's 30th Cavalry Division reached the outskirts of Slutsk, as the rifle divisions of 28th Army were making their best speed to keep up with the advance of the mobile group. By June 30 German reinforcements were arriving, including elements of the 4th Panzer Division at Baranovichi which were sent to block the road to Slutsk. From June 22 to July 3 the 28th Army and Group Pliev had forced a German retreat of 250 km to the vicinity of Stolbtsy, but the advance now paused to bring up supplies to overcome the increasing resistance.

=== Baranovichi-Slonim Operation ===
Resistance along the Baranovichi axis grew on July 4 as reinforcements continued to arrive, including the remainder of 4th Panzer, units of 12th Panzer Division that had broken through from Minsk, and the 1st Hungarian Cavalry Division moving up from Pinsk. 28th Army reached a line from Minkeviche to Kletsk to Rybaki. At this time Baranovichi was garrisoned by the 52nd Special Designation Security Division, a panzer battalion and three assault gun brigades. A defensive line was already being prepared along the Shchara River based on the town of Slonim. The Front was ordered, under STAVKA operational directive no. 220127, to immediately resume its advance on Baranovichi and subsequently to Brest with the 48th, 65th and 28th Armies; however the 28th was stretched out over a 25 km line of march and was still 12 km from its designated attack sector. The 48th Guards was reported as at roughly 85 percent of its authorized strength.

The Army commander, Lt. Gen. Alexander Luchinsky, directed his forces to outflank Baranovichi from the south on July 5, and by evening had liberated Lyakhovichi. Intensive fighting for Baranovichi took place on July 6–7. The line along the Shchara was penetrated but the Army advanced only a few kilometres. By the end of the second day the town was partially encircled but the Soviet advance was slowed by German reinforcements and continuing difficulties in bringing the Front's forces up to the attack sectors. Overnight the 65th Army, assisted by the 28th, stormed Baranovichi in an unexpected night attack which cleared it by 0400 hours on July 8 as the German forces withdrew to the west. By the end of the day the Army had advanced as far as Gintsevichi. On July 25 the 143rd Guards Rifle Regiment was decorated with the Order of the Red Banner for its part in the crossing of the Shchara and the liberation of Slonim, while two days later the division as a whole received the same award for the liberation of Baranovichi.

=== Lublin–Brest Offensive ===
The 28th Army continued making its main offensive in the direction of Kossovo and Smolyanitsa and by July 13 had reached the Yaselda River along its entire front. At this point it encountered much stiffer resistance from the newly-arrived 102nd Infantry Division and the 5th Hungarian Reserve Division. It fell to the 1st Mechanized Corps to pierce this line and allow the advance to continue. By July 16 the Army had reached the approaches to Brest.

The operation to liberate that city began on July 17. The Front's main attack would be made by its left-flank armies with the right-flank forces in support; 28th Army on the right with 61st Army and the Pliev Group were to outflank the city from the north and northwest, encircle and capture it. The attack began with a 15-20 minute artillery preparation. 28th Army, with the Pliev Group, directed their advances towards Kamenets, and by the end of the day had covered 25 km. After beating off numerous German counterattacks the next day the Army forced the Lesnaya River east of Dmitrovichi and linked up with 61st Army. From July 19 the German High Command began heavy counterattacks against the Army and the Pliev Group in order to continue its hold on Brest, and these would continue until the 21st. Only with the commitment of 20th Corps from second echelon in the direction of the railroad to Brest along the Army's left flank during the second half of July 20 did the offensive begin to gain momentum and the German forces begin to withdraw towards the city. During July 25–26 the Army forced the Lesnaya River north of Czernawczyci and General Rokossovskii handed over his reserve 46th Rifle Corps to help complete the encirclement. This was done on July 27 and beginning after midnight on the 28th the 20th Corps drove into the fortified zone from the north, throwing off counterattacks, and linked up with 9th Guards Rifle Corps of 61st Army and the main forces of 70th Army. By the end of the day the division was recognized for its part in the liberation of Brest, while its 53rd Guards Sapper Battalion (Maj. Kandalin, Ivan Vasilevich) was awarded its name as an honorific. On August 10 the 138th Guards Rifle Regiment would receive the Order of the Red Banner for its part in the same battle.

== Into Germany ==
Following the massive push of the summer offensive the Soviet armies remained largely inactive over the following months. In September the 28th Army returned to the Reserve of the Supreme High Command for rest and rebuilding and in October was reassigned to the 3rd Belorussian Front on the East Prussian border. It was almost immediately involved in the abortive Goldap-Gumbinnen Operation, which largely ended on its sector by October 30. In the planning for the Vistula-Oder Offensive in January 1945 the Front organized its shock group into two echelons with the 39th, 5th and 28th Armies in the first, backed by the 11th Guards Army and two tank corps. The 28th Army had its main forces on its right flank and was to launch a vigorous attack north of the Stallupönen - Gumbinnen paved highway in the general direction of Insterburg. Its breakthrough frontage was 7 km wide and its immediate objective was to destroy the Gumbinnen group of German forces in conjunction with 5th Army before assisting 11th Guards in its deployment along the Inster River.

=== East Prussian Offensive ===
3rd Belorussian Front began its part of the offensive on the morning of January 13. The Army, mainly facing the 549th Volksgrenadier Division, broke through the defense along the Kischen - Grunhaus sector and penetrated as much as 7 km by the day's end while fighting off 14 counterattacks by infantry and tanks. On the next day less progress was made as the 3rd Guards Rifle Corps faced an extended fight for the strongpoint of Kattenau. January 16 saw only small progress as the German forces continued to cover the routes to Gumbinnen. By now it was apparent to the Front commander, Army Gen. I. D. Chernyakhovsky, that the breakthrough would not come on this sector and he moved his second echelon to the 39th Army's front. On January 19 the Army began to advance more successfully. General Luchinskii concentrated the maximum amount of artillery fire in support of the 3rd Guards and 128th Rifle Corps allowing a breakthrough on a narrow sector towards the northeastern outskirts of Gumbinnen. Meanwhile, the 20th Corps reached the town from the south, but the German grouping continued to resist and the Army's units were forced to consolidate. During a two-day battle on January 20–21 the 20th and 128th Corps finally captured Gumbinnen, but a large remnant of the German forces managed to retreat to the Angerapp River, which the 28th Army reached by the end of the second day. By 2300 hours on January 23 it became apparent that the German forces facing the Army were in retreat to the west. Over the next two days the Army advanced up to 35 km and reached a line from Kortmedin to Gerdauen by the end of the 26th, less than 70 km southeast of Königsberg.

By February 8 the 20th Corps, in cooperation with forces of 5th Army, outflanked the town of Preußisch Eylau from the north and began fighting along its outskirts, a battle that continued for some days. Sgt. Maj. Aleksei Leontievich Pshenichko commanded a platoon of the 47th Guards Reconnaissance Company. On one of the first days his platoon successfully uncovered much of the German fire plan and took 25 soldiers and one officer as prisoners. During February 16 a group of German forces, attempting to escape to the southwest, attempted to take the 48th Guards in the rear in the vicinity of the village of Bomben. Pshenichko's scouts repelled four attacks and killed or wounded up to 80 of the attackers; the Starshina's personal example was crucial to holding the line, but he was killed in action. On April 19 he would be posthumously be made a Hero of the Soviet Union. On April 5 the 146th Guards Rifle Regiment would be awarded the Order of Bogdan Khmelnitsky, 2nd Degree, for its part in the fighting for Preußisch Eylau.

After six weeks of almost continuous fighting by the beginning of March the divisions of 3rd Belorussian Front were seriously understrength; the 48th Guards at this time contained roughly 2,500 personnel. Despite this the Front ordered a new operation to eliminate the remaining German forces southwest of the Königsberg fortified zone. The new offensive began on March 13, with 28th Army attacking in the direction of Bladiau, which was taken on March 15. During the night of March 25/26 the Army, in cooperation with 31st Army, stormed the town of Rosenberg and advanced towards Balga, capturing 6,200 soldiers, 25 tanks and 220 guns of various calibres. Immediately after the operation ended on March 29 the 28th was reassigned to the Reserve of the Supreme High command and began moving across eastern Germany towards the Oder River. On April 26 the division would be decorated with the Order of Suvorov, 2nd Degree, in recognition of its role in the fighting southwest of Königsberg.

=== Battle of Berlin ===
By mid-April the division had arrived in the 1st Ukrainian Front. The battle for the Oder and Neisse Rivers began on April 16 but 28th Army's leading divisions did not arrive at the front and begin combat operations until April 22. By this time the Front commander, Marshal Ivan Konev, could foresee fierce fighting for Berlin and decided to reinforce 3rd Guards Tank Army to the maximum. To this end General Luchinskii was ordered to load his 48th and 61st Guards Rifle Divisions onto trucks to join the tank army in the Baruth area. These divisions would remain under 3rd Guards Tank's command for the remainder of the Berlin battle. During the fighting on this day the 3rd Guards Tank forced the Notte Canal, broke through the Berlin outer defensive line and reached the inner line in the Marienfelde area in the southern suburbs.

On the morning of April 23 the division arrived in the Marienfelde area, operationally subordinated to the 9th Mechanized Corps. Much of that day was spent in coordinating the infantry and armor with artillery and air support for the purpose of forcing the next major obstacle, the Teltow Canal. The crossing was set to begin at 0600 hours on April 24. Under intense direct and indirect artillery fire the 22nd Guards Motorized Rifle Brigade forced the canal on wooden rafts and the foundations of destroyed bridges and seized small bridgeheads. Once these were expanded the forward detachments of the 48th Guards followed. By 1300 hours a pontoon bridge had been installed and the main forces of the division, plus the tanks of the 9th Mechanized, began crossing to the north bank at 1400 hours, despite powerful German artillery and machine gun fire on the area and several counterattacks. During the day the division advanced as much as 2.5 km to the north, reaching a line from Lichterfelde to Zehlendorf. 3rd Guards Tank resumed the offensive the next morning and the 48th Guards assisted in clearing those two places before advancing up to 4 km and beginning the fight for Steglitz. During the day the Soviet forces completed the encirclement of Berlin.

By April 26 the division was joined by its Corps-mate, 20th Rifle Division, in 3rd Guards Tank. During the day the combined force continued to attack northwards toward the city center. Steglitz was cleared along with the southern part of Schmargendorf and the interior defense line was reached. The next day the 48th and 61st Guards again teamed up with 9th Mechanized to advance 4 km, capturing the Friedenau area and reaching a line along the Hauptstrasse and Haynauer Strasse. On April 28 the division was ordered to join with the 6th Guards Tank Corps to attack in the general direction of Schmargendorf Station and the Preussenpark and by the end of the day to seize the line of the Landwehr Canal from Woyrschstrasse to the aquarium, but made only minor progress due to numerous obstacles and stubborn resistance, and this continued to be the case the following day. Finally, on April 30 the 48th Guards, 20th Rifle, and the 6th Guards Tank reached the southern edge of Preussenpark as organized resistance waned. On May 2 the 138th Guards Rifle Regiment (Col. Varypaev, Pavel Pavlovich) was one of the many units granted the honorific of "Berlin" for its part in the capture of the German capital. Following the end of the Berlin operation the division joined the rest of its Front in the final advance on Prague but saw little combat.

== Postwar ==
The division was awarded the Order of Kutuzov 2nd class, on June 4 for its part in the battle for Berlin. On June 27 four more men of the division were made Heroes of the Soviet Union. By August 14 the 48th Guards had moved east to the area of Lida, where it remained until it was reformed as the 38th Guards Rifle Brigade. In February 1947 the 10th Guards Tank Regiment was assigned to the 38th Guards Brigade; together these provided a cadre for the second formation of the 48th Guards Rifle Division on September 1, 1949. On May 20, 1957 the unit was reorganized as a motorized division, but this was short-lived as the entire division was disbanded on January 10, 1959.
