= Günter Rimkus =

German dramaturge

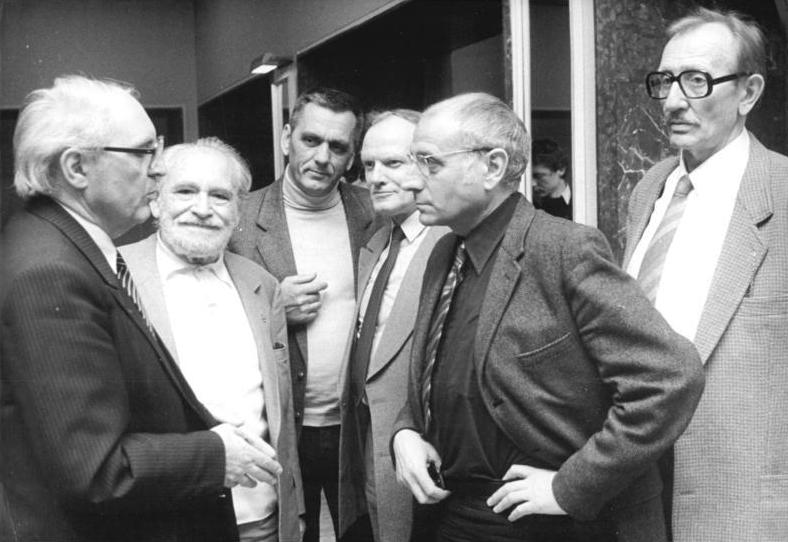
Gunter Rimkus, fourth from left.

Günter Rimkus (22 December 1928 – 29 September 2015) was a German dramaturge and, from 1984 to 1991, manager of the Staatsoper Unter den Linden.

== Life ==
Born in Stallupönen, East Prussia, Rimkus studied vocal music at the Hochschule für Musik Franz Liszt, Weimar from 1947 to 1953. After graduating, he obtained the position of dramaturge at the Deutsche Staatsoper Berlin. In 1970, he was appointed deputy artistic director there and succeeded Hans Pischner as director of the house from 1984 to 1991. Throughout his tenure at both the Admiralspalast and Unter den Linden, he had a significant influence on its high artistic reputation. For example, he was instrumental in organising the restructuring of the opera and ballet ensembles, as well as the chorus and the Staatskapelle, after the building of the Berlin Wall in 1961, thus ensuring the theatre's ability to perform. The Berlin Hochschule für Musik "Hanns Eisler" appointed him professor of opera dramaturgy.

During his tenure, he particularly promoted young talent and thus significantly rejuvenated the ensemble. He brought today's world stars such as René Pape and Roman Trekel directly from the universities into the ensemble. His repertoire policy continued the traditional promotion of contemporary works. Thus, among others, Büchner by Friedrich Schenker, Gastmahl by Georg Katzer and Graf Mirabeau by Siegfried Matthus were premiered. First performances included Shostakovich's The Tale of the Priest and of His Workman Balda, Schoenberg's Moses and Aron and Victor Ullmann's Der Kaiser von Atlantis. He also successfully expanded the repertoire with rarely performed works such as Verdi's I vespri siciliani, Weber's Euryanthe, Goethe/Reichardt's Erwin und Elmire, Meyerbeer's l'Africaine and Hindemith's Neues vom Tage. During the reconstruction of the Lindenoper in the mid-1980s, he strongly advocated the re-installation of the gable inscription FRIDERICUS REX APOLLINI ET MUSIS, which had been replaced by DEUTSCHE STAATSOPER during the reconstruction in 1955, which had led to Erich Kleiber's breach of contract with the Lindenoper at the time.

As a freelancer for radio, television and records, he rendered outstanding services to the popularisation of classical and modern music. As a publicist, he contributed to both domestic and foreign music journals. Under his directorship, the number of guest tours through Europe and to the Far East increased considerably. From 1976 to 1990, he was a member of the Cultural Association of the GDR Member of the Berliner Stadtverordnetenversammlung. In November 1985, he was elected vice-president of the Verband der Theaterschaffenden at the V.Congress.

Rimkus was married to prima ballerina Monika Lubitz and father of a daughter. Rimkus died on 29 September 2015 at the age of 86.

== Awards ==
- 1973 Order of the Banner of Labor
- 1979 Patriotic Order of Merit in Bronze and 1988 in Silver
