= Friedrich Philipp Dulk =

German chemist (1788–1851)

- Born: November 22, 1788; Stallupönen, Kingdom of Prussia, Holy Roman Empire
- Died: December 14, 1851 (aged 63); Königsberg, Kingdom of Prussia
- Education: University of Königsberg
- Scientific career
- Fields: Chemistry
- Workplaces: University of Königsberg

Friedrich Philipp Dulk (22 November 1788 in Stallupönen – 14 December 1851 in Königsberg) was a German pharmacist and chemist. He was the father of writer Albert Dulk (1819–1884) and father-in-law to mathematician Otto Hesse.

He studied law at the University of Königsberg, and in the meantime received training in pharmacy from his brother. In 1812 he qualified as a pharmacist in Berlin, and three years later, took charge of his brother's pharmacy. In 1825 he obtained his habilitation and in 1833 became a full professor of chemistry at the University of Königsberg. In 1847 he was elected a delegate to the Prussian Landtag.

== Published works ==
In 1829–30 he published a two-volume Prussian pharmacopeia titled "Pharmacopoea Borussica : die Preußische Pharmacopöe" (volume 1; volume 2). His other written works include:

- Über Elektromagnetismus, 1823 – On electromagnetism.
- Einfache Mittel, 1829.
- Zusammengesetzte Mittel, 1830.
- Anhang zur Preußischen Pharmakopöe, 1830 – Notes on the Prussian pharmacopoeia.
- Handbuch der Chemie (2 volumes, 1833–34) – Handbook of chemistry.
- Synoptische Tabelle über die Atomgewichte der einfachen und mehrerer zusammengesetzter Körper und über das Verhältniß der Bestandtheile der letzteren (4th edition, 1839) – Synoptic table of atomic weights of simple and more composite bodies, etc.
