= Klaus Theweleit =

German sociologist and writer (born 1942)

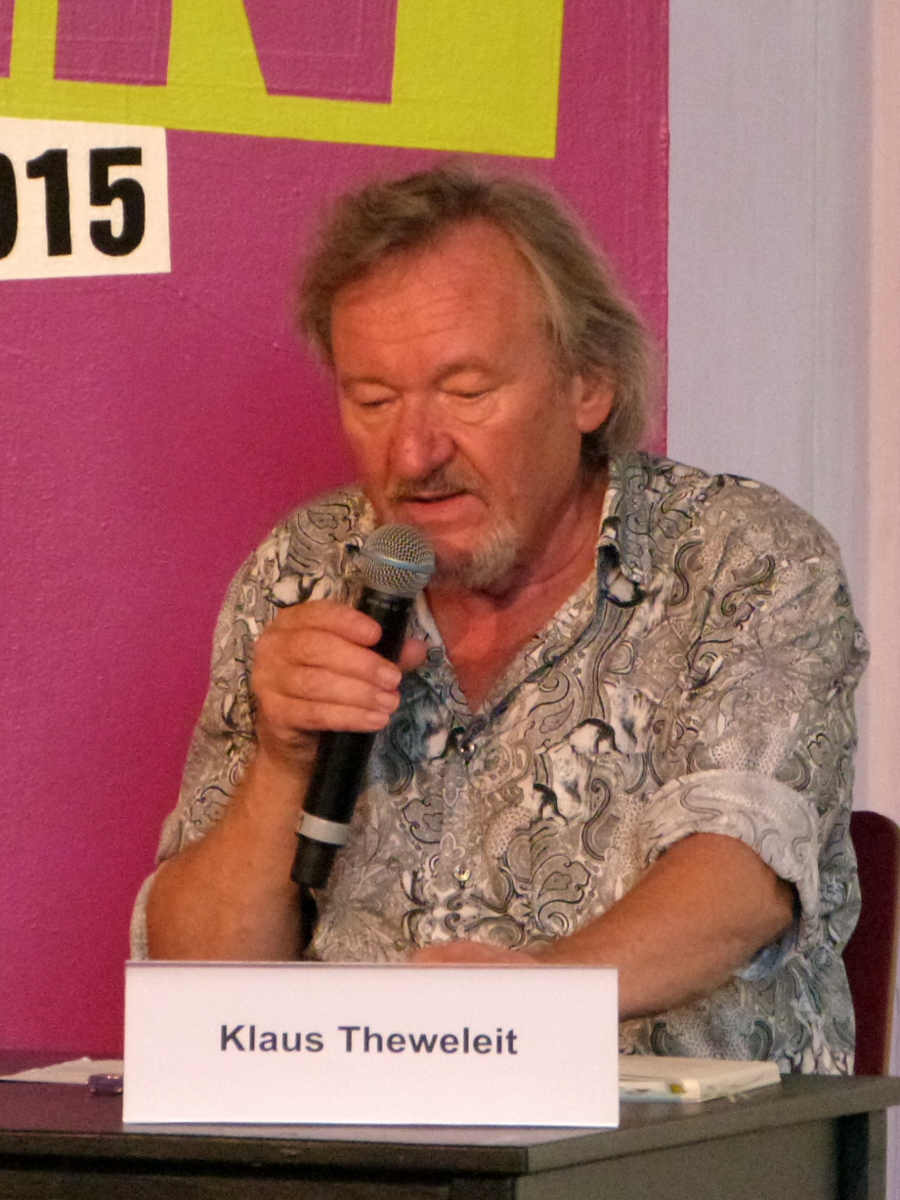
- Theweleit
- Born: 7 February 1942 (age 84); Ebenrode, East Prussia, Nazi Germany. (now Nesterov, Russia)
- Occupations: Sociologist and writer
- Website: http://www.klaus-theweleit.de/

Klaus Theweleit (born 7 February 1942) is a German sociologist and writer.

== Life ==
Theweleit was born in Ebenrode, East Prussia (now Nesterov, Russia), the son of a railway company worker and a Jewish mother. He wrote the following about his father: "Above all he was a railroader, wholeheartedly, as he used to say, and then a human being. He was a rather good human being and a good fascist. His beatings which he gave away abundantly and brutally as it was usual in his time and with the best of intentions were the first lessons I received on fascism, a fact I only later fully discovered."

Theweleit studied German studies and English studies in Kiel and Freiburg. From 1969–1972, he worked as a freelancer for a public radio station (Südwestfunk).

He wrote his dissertation Freikorpsliteratur und der Körper des soldatischen Mannes about Freikorps narratives, a sub-literature produced by paramilitaries organized in Freikorps, who, during the early Weimar republic, had fought external or internal enemies. In academia only few historians had read and analysed this literature before Theweleit. His book Männerphantasien (1977); translated as Male Fantasies (1987), a study of the "proto-fascist consciousness" in general and the bodily experience of these former soldiers in particular. Throughout the book Theweleit uses ideas, terminology and empirical experience from works of Margaret Mahler, Wilhelm Reich, Gilles Deleuze, Félix Guattari, Melanie Klein, and Michel Foucault among others to develop his theory of the "fascist male imprinting and socialization". In the introduction, Theweleit points out that discussions with Margaret Berger and his wife Monika Theweleit-Kubale (both of whom have professional clinical experience) had an important influence on the book as well as the feedback from Erhard Lucas, a leading German left-wing historian of the Weimar Unrest.

Theweleit lives in Freiburg and teaches in Germany, the United States, Switzerland, and Austria. He was a lecturer at the Institute of Sociology at the University of Freiburg and lecturer at the film academy in Berlin. From 1998 until retirement he was a professor for "art and theory" at the Staatliche Akademie für Bildende Künste, the art college, at Karlsruhe. In 2021, he received the Theodor W. Adorno Award.

== Selected bibliography ==
=== English ===
- Male Fantasies. Minneapolis: University of Minnesota Press, 1987; Polity Press, 1987.
- Object-Choice (All You Need Is Love...): On Mating Strategies & A Fragment of a Freud Biography. London; New York: Verso, 1994 (ISBN 0860916421).

=== German and English ===
- Antony Gormley: A Conversation with Klaus Theweleit and Monika Theweleit-Kubale [ein Gespräch mit Klaus Theweleit und Monika Theweleit-Kubale], edited by Hans-Werner Schmidt, et al. Bielefeld: Kerber Verlag, 1999.

=== German ===
- Männerphantasien, 2 Vols., Verlag Roter Stern/Stroemfeld, Frankfurt am Main/Basel 1977–1978. Various paperback editions, first with Rowohlt, Reinbek 1983–1994, then with DTV, Munich and now with Piper, Munich 2000.
- K.Th. with Martin Langbein: Bruch, Verlag Roter Stern/Stroemfeld 1980. sold only together with the German edition of Art Spiegelman's: Breakdowns. Also sold with the recent re-edition.
- Buch der Könige, Stroemfeld 1988–2003.
  - Vol. 1, Buch der Könige. Orpheus und Euridike, Stroemfeld 1988.
    - Vol. 2 Buch der Könige in 2 books (2x, 2y), Stroemfeld 1994 (sold together):
  - Buch der Könige 2x. Orpheus am Machtpol, Stroemfeld 1994.
  - Buch der Könige 2y. Recording Angel's Mysteries, Stroemfeld 1994.
- Objektwahl. All You Need Is Love. Über Paarbildungsstrategien & Bruchstücke einer Freudbiographie, Stroemfeld 1990.
- One Plus One. Rede für Jean-Luc Godard zur Verleihung des Theodor W. Adorno Preises an J.-L. Godard, Brinkmann u. Bose, Berlin 1995. ISBN 3-922660-65-7
- Das Land das Ausland heißt. Essays, Reden, Interviews zu Politik und Kunst, DTV, Munich 1995.
- Heiner Müller. Traumtext, Stroemfeld 1996. ISBN 3-87877-579-2
- Ghosts. Drei leicht inkorrekte Vorträge, Stroemfeld 1998.
- Der Pocahontas Komplex, Stroemfeld 1999.
  - Vol. 1: Pocahontas in Wonderland. Shakespeare on Tour, Stroemfeld 1999, ISBN 3-87877-751-5
  - Vol. 2: Buch der Königstöchter. Von Göttermännern und Menschenfrauen. Mythenbildung vorhomerisch, amerikanisch. Stroemfeld, Frankfurt am Main 2013, ISBN 978-3-87877-752-6.
  - Vol. 4: "you give me fever". Arno Schmidt. Seelandschaften mit Pocahontas. Die Sexualität schreiben nach WW II, Stroemfeld 1999. ISBN 3-87877-754-X
- Der Knall. 11. September, das Verschwinden der Realität und ein Kriegsmodell, Stroemfeld 2002. ISBN 3-87877-870-8
- Deutschlandfilme. Godard, Hitchcock, Pasolini. Filmdenken & Gewalt, Stroemfeld 2003, ISBN 3-87877-827-9
- Tor zur Welt. Fußball als Realitätsmodell, Kiepenheuer & Witsch, Cologne 2004. ISBN 3-462-03393-X
- Friendly Fire. Deadline Texte, Stroemfeld 2005.
- Übertragung, Gegenübertragung, Dritter Körper. Zur Gehirnveränderung durch die Medien, (=International Flusser Lectures), Verlag der Buchhandlung Walther König, Cologne, 2007.
- Jimi Hendrix: Eine Biographie, Rowohlt, Berlin, Germany, 2010.

== Audio CDs ==
- Das RAF –Gespenst, 2 CDs, Cologne, 2001.
- Extasen der Zeitenmischung. Geschichtsdarstellung in der Kunst, 2 CDs, Cologne, 2001.
