= Albert Dulk =

German author

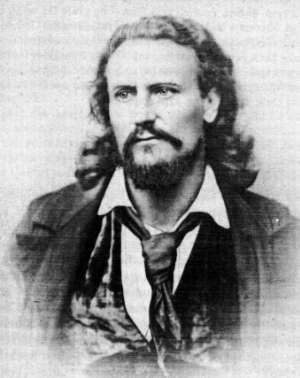
- Dulk in 1855

Albert Friedrich Benno Dulk (1819–1884) was a German writer.

== Biography ==
Dulk was born in Königsberg to Friedrich Philipp Dulk (1788–1851). He studied medicine and the natural sciences in Königsberg and in Leipzig and Breslau. He took an active part in the popular uprisings of 1848, at which time his revolutionary drama Lea appeared. After traveling in Asia, he settled in Geneva in 1850, and subsequently in Stuttgart, where he wrote the dramas Jesus der Christ (1865) and Simson (1859), which depict the conflict between Judaism and paganism. One of his later dramas, König Enzio, was set to music by Johann Joseph Abert.

As an adherent of socialism he became conspicuous, in 1871, through his opposition to the Franco-Prussian War, and his publications Patriotismus (Patriotism) and Frömmigkeit (Piety) obtained a wide circulation. In 1882 he founded the first society of freethinkers in Germany in Stuttgart, and during the last years of his life he principally wrote about the discussion of the radical side of religio-philosophical subjects.
