= Kamianka (Bazavluk) =

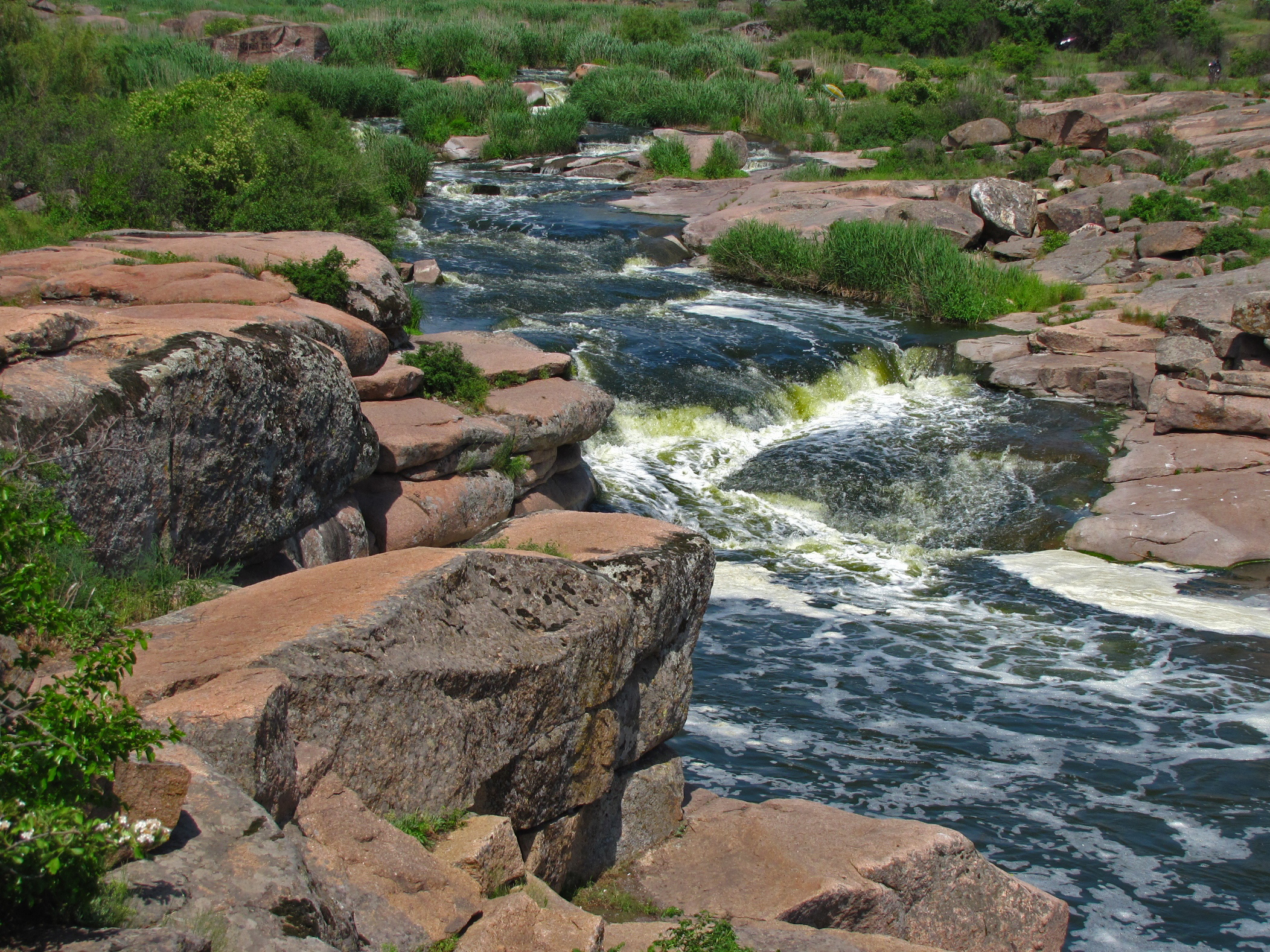
- Rapids, Kamyanka river near Tokivske
- Native name: Ка́м'янка (Ukrainian)

Location
- Country: Ukraine

Physical characteristics
- Source
  - location: near Chervonyi Orlik, Dnipropetrovsk Oblast
  - coordinates: 48°11′27″N 33°59′26″E
- Mouth: Bazavluk
  - coordinates: 47°39′00″N 34°01′26″E
- Length: 88 km (55 mi)
- Basin size: 1,750 km^{2} (680 sq mi)

Basin features
- Progression: Bazavluk→ Dnieper→ Dnieper–Bug estuary→ Black Sea

The Kamianka (Ukrainian: Кам'янка) is a river that flows through the Dnipropetrovsk Oblast of Ukraine. The river is a right tributary of the Bazavluk, and its total length is 88 kilometres (55 mi) with a drainage basin of 1,750 square kilometres (680 mi^{2}). Its course begins near Chervonyi Orlik.
