= Nesterov =

Town in Kaliningrad Oblast, Russia

Nesterov Нестеров
- Town
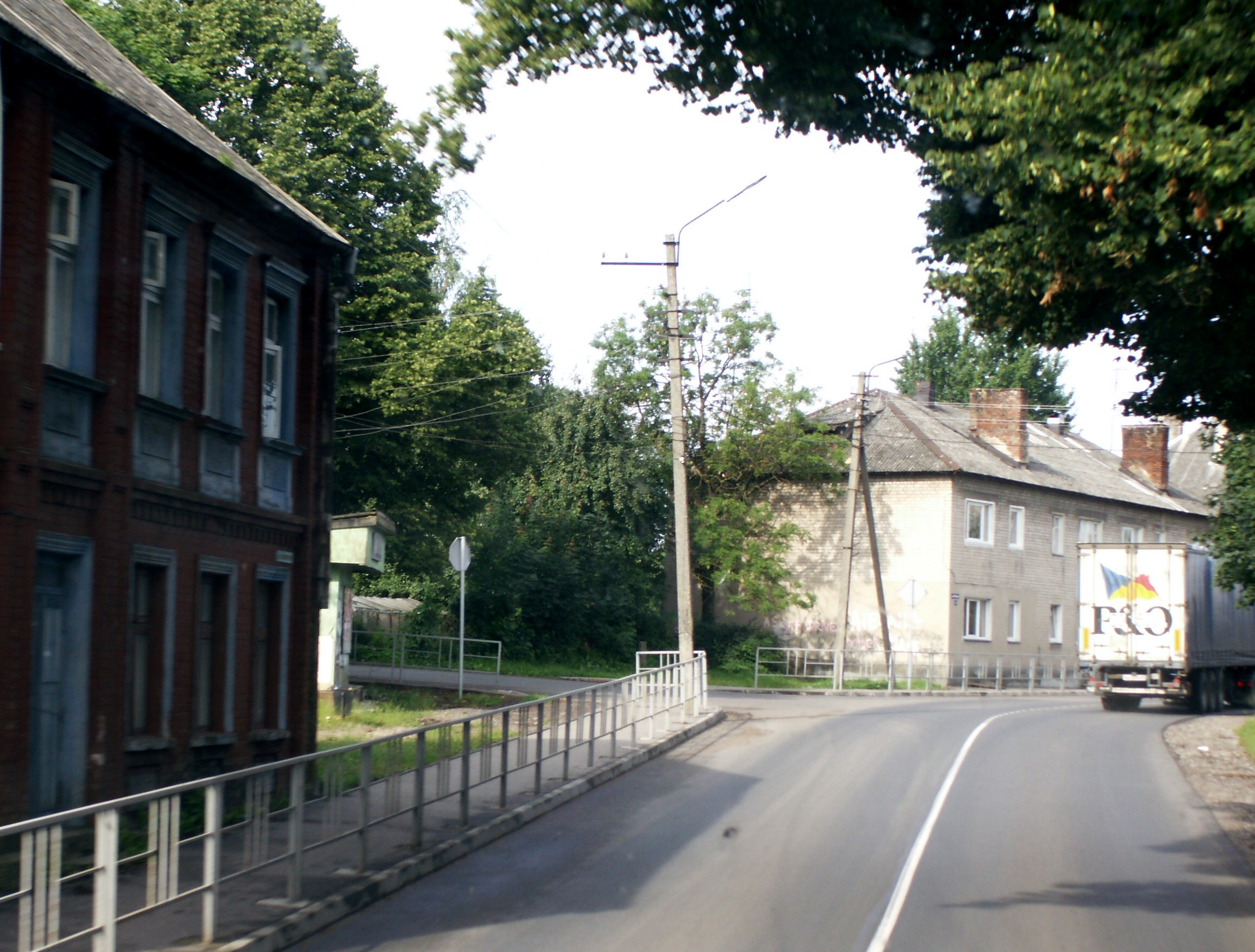
- Leningradskaya Street in Nesterov

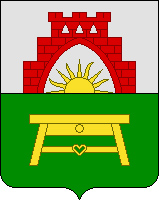
- Coat of arms
- Interactive map of Nesterov
- Location of Nesterov Nesterov (European Russia) Nesterov (Europe)
- Coordinates: 54°37′50″N 22°34′24″E
- Country: Russia
- Federal subject: Kaliningrad Oblast
- Administrative district: Nesterovsky District
- Town of district significanceSelsoviet: Nesterov
- First mentioned: 1539
- Town status since: 1722
- Elevation: 65 m (213 ft)

Population (2010 Census)
  - Total: 4,595
  - Estimate (2023): 3,342 (−27.3%)

Administrative status
  - Capital of: Nesterovsky District, town of district significance of Nesterov

Municipal status
  - Municipal district: Nesterovsky Municipal District
  - Urban settlement: Nesterovskoye Urban Settlement
  - Capital of: Nesterovsky Municipal District, Nesterovskoye Urban Settlement
- Time zone: UTC+2 (MSK–1)
- Postal code: 238010
- Dialing code: +7 40144
- OKTMO ID: 27624101001

Nesterov (NESS-te-rov, Russian: Нестеров, until 1938 German: Stallupönen, Lithuanian: Stalupėnai, Polish: Stołupiany; from 1938 to 1946: Ebenrode) is a town and the administrative center of Nesterovsky District in the Kaliningrad Oblast of Russia, located 140 kilometers (87 mi) east of Kaliningrad, near the Russian-Lithuanian border on the railway connecting Kaliningrad Oblast with Moscow. Population figures: 4,595 (2010 census); 5,049 (2002 census); 4,826 (1989 Soviet census).

== History ==
=== Early history ===
In the Middle Ages, the area in Old Prussia had been settled by the Nadruvian tribe of the Baltic Prussians. It was conquered by the Teutonic Knights in about 1276 and incorporated into the State of the Teutonic Order. From the 15th century onwards, the Knights largely resettled the lands with Samogitian and Lithuanian colonists. Since 1466, it was part of the Kingdom of Poland as a fief held by the Teutonic Order.

The settlement itself was first mentioned as Stallupoenen, or Stallupönen, in 1539, named after a nearby river called Stalupė in Lithuanian. At that time, with the secularization of the Order's Prussian lands in 1525, Stallupönen had already become part of the Duchy of Prussia, a vassal duchy of Poland which in 1618 was inherited by the Hohenzollern margraves of Brandenburg. Stallupönen then belonged to Brandenburg-Prussia and became a part of the Kingdom of Prussia in 1701. The church was built by 1589, and Lithuanian-language church services were held here. Local pastor Gregorius Wirczinski was one of the revisers of a Lithuanian psalter published in 1625. The population was decimated during the Great Northern War plague outbreak in 1710. The settlement was resettled by Lithuanian and German colonists in the following years. King Frederick William I granted it town privileges in 1722. Lithuanian poet Kristijonas Donelaitis was the rector of the local school in 1740–1743. Like other cities in the region during the Seven Years' War between 1757 and 1762, it was occupied by the Russian forces. It became part of the newly formed province of East Prussia in 1773.

=== Late modern period ===
During the Prussian-led unification of Germany, Stallupönen became a part of the German Empire in 1871. In 1885, the town had a largely Lithuanian-speaking population of 4,181, often employed in agriculture. With the construction of railways, the town became well-acquainted to travelers, as it was the last stop on the German-Russian frontier. Here, travelers made the transfer from standard gauge railway carriages of western Europe to the broad gauge carriages of Russia.

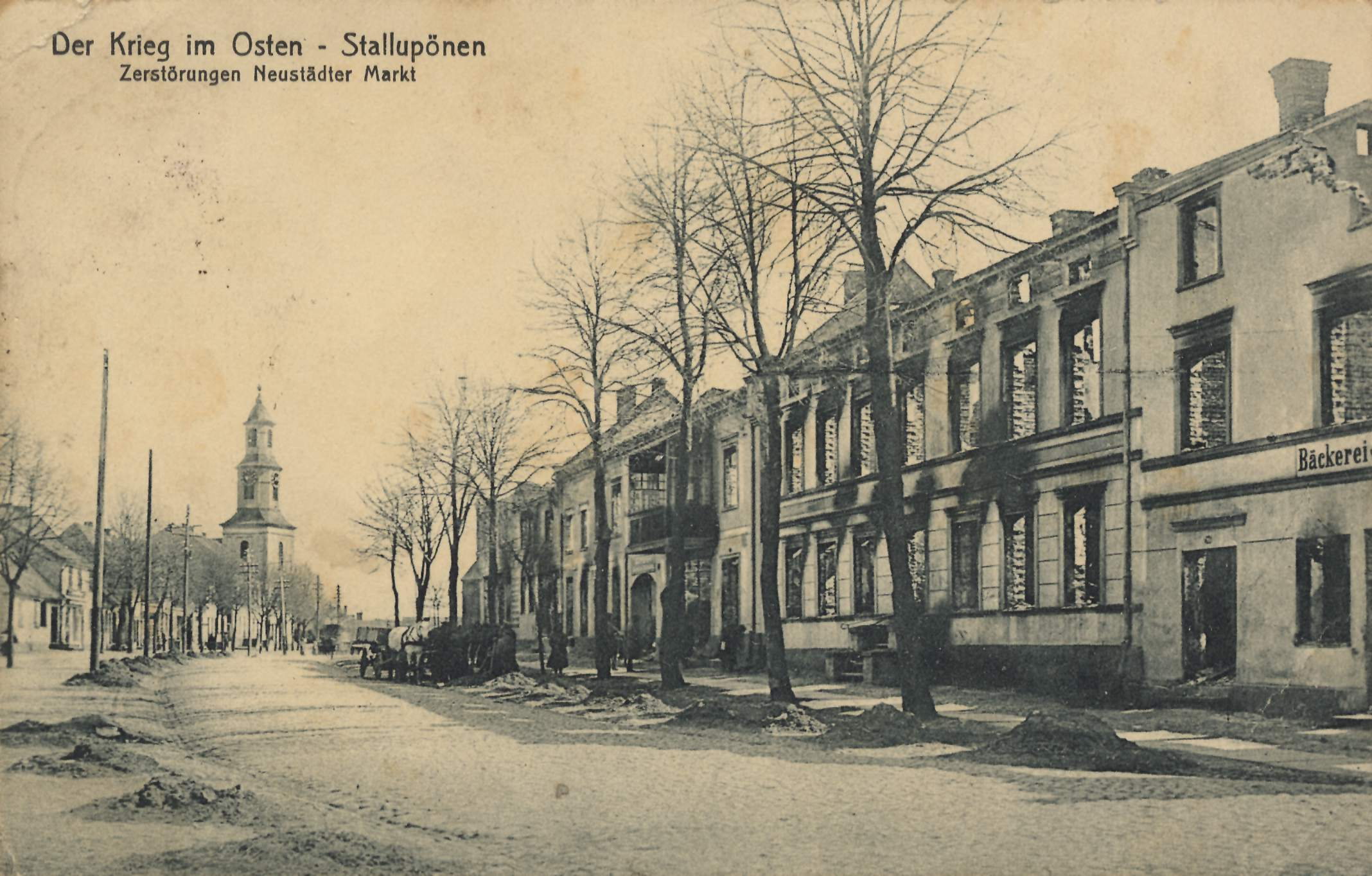
Devastated townhouses, 1914

In August 1914, the city and the surrounding area were a focal point of Battle of Stallupönen between Russian and German armies, an opening battle on the Eastern Front of World War I. It was occupied by the Russian Army between August 18, 1914 and February 18, 1915.

Because of the Lithuanian minority living there, Lithuania tried unsuccessfully to obtain the town from Germany after regaining independence following World War I. In 1938, the Nazi regime renamed the town Ebenrode to erase traces of non-German origin.

=== World War II ===
During World War II, the Germans operated a subcamp of the Stalag I-A prisoner-of-war camp for Allied POWs in the town. From June 1941 to June 1942, the Germans also operated the Oflag 52 POW camp for Soviet officers, then replaced by the Stalag I-D POW camp until October 1942. Poor sanitary conditions, overcrowding and malnutrition resulted in a high mortality rate. Jews and political commissars were executed. Afterwards it was relocated to Šilutė in German-occupied Lithuania.

The town was overrun by the Soviet Red Army during World War II on January 13, 1945. The region was transferred from Germany to the Russian SFSR in 1945 and made a part of Kaliningrad Oblast. In 1946, the town, whose German inhabitants had been largely evacuated or forcibly expelled not always in accordance with the Potsdam Agreement, was renamed Nesterov after Sergey Nesterov, a Soviet war hero who was killed in the vicinity.

== Demographics ==
Historical population
Year	Pop.	±%
1885	4,181	—
1910	5,650	+35.1%
1989	4,826	−14.6%
2002	5,049	+4.6%
2010	4,595	−9.0%
2021	3,336	−27.4%

Distribution of the population by ethnicity according to the 2021 census:

	percent
Russians	88.07%
Lithuanians	2.04%
Belarusians	1.86%
Ukrainians	1.38%
Germans	0.48%
Poles	0.42%
Yazidis	0.36%
Tatars	0.33%
Chuvash	0.30%
Mordvins	0.18%
Azeris	0.18%
Armenians	0.15%
refused answer or no data	2.10%

== Administrative and municipal status ==
Within the framework of administrative divisions, Nesterov serves as the administrative center of Nesterovsky District. As an administrative division, it is incorporated within Nesterovsky District as the town of district significance of Nesterov. As a municipal division, the town of district significance of Nesterov is incorporated within Nesterovsky Municipal District as Nesterovskoye Urban Settlement.

== Culture ==
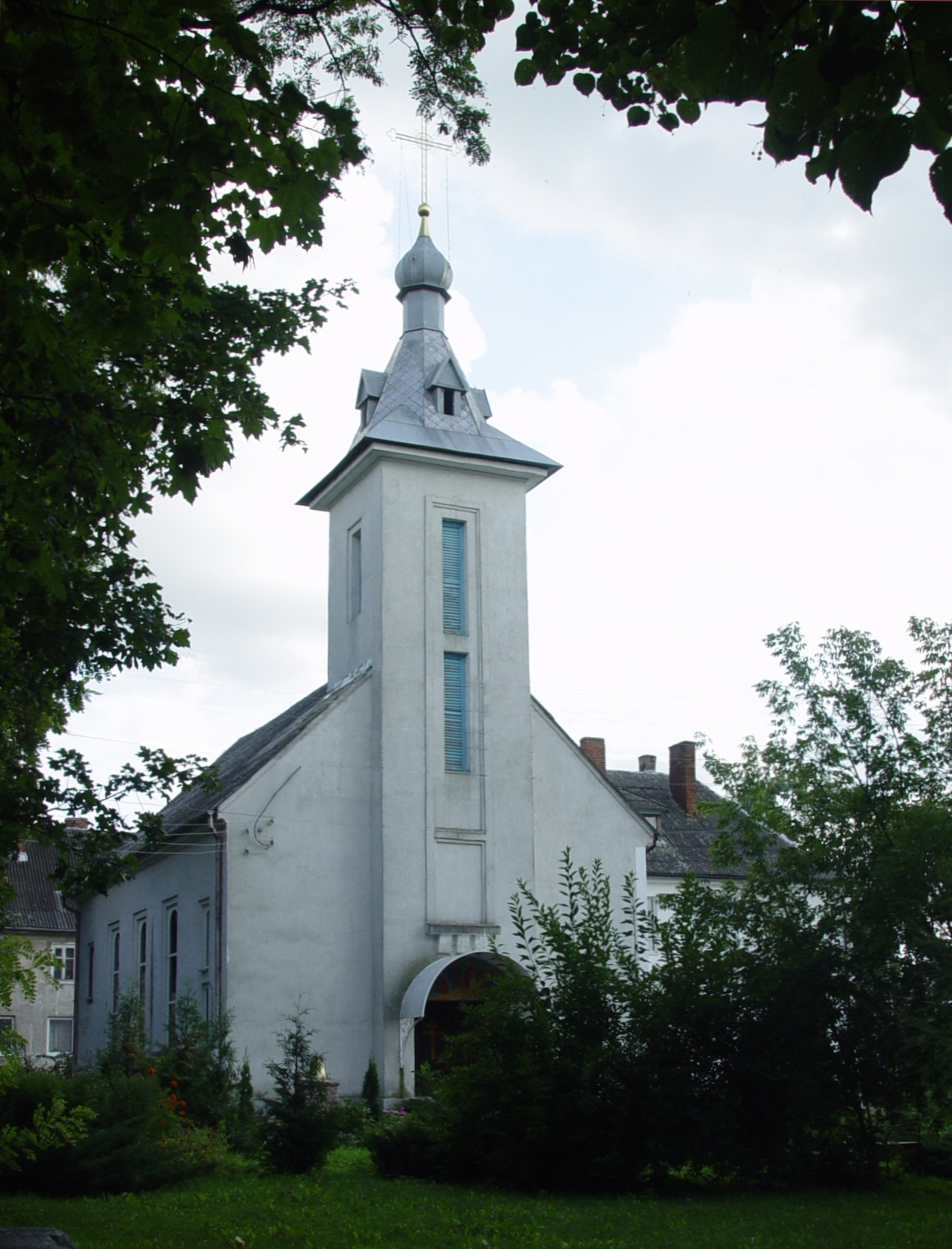
Holy Spirit Church

Today Nesterov is one of the cultural centers of the Lithuanian minority in Russia.

== Notable people ==
- Max Askanazy (1865–1940), German-Swiss pathologist
- Friedrich Philipp Dulk (1788–1851), German pharmacist and chemist
- Walther Funk (1890–1960), German economist and Nazi official
- Werner Gitt (born 1937), German engineer
- Günter Rimkus (1928–2015), German dramaturge and opera manager
- Felix Steiner (1896–1966), German officer who served in both World War I and World War II
- Klaus Theweleit (b. 1942), German sociologist and writer
- Oscar Werwath (1880–1948), German engineer and academic administrator
- Ulrich Woronowicz (1928–2011), German Evangelical pastor, theologian and social activist
