= Bazavluk =

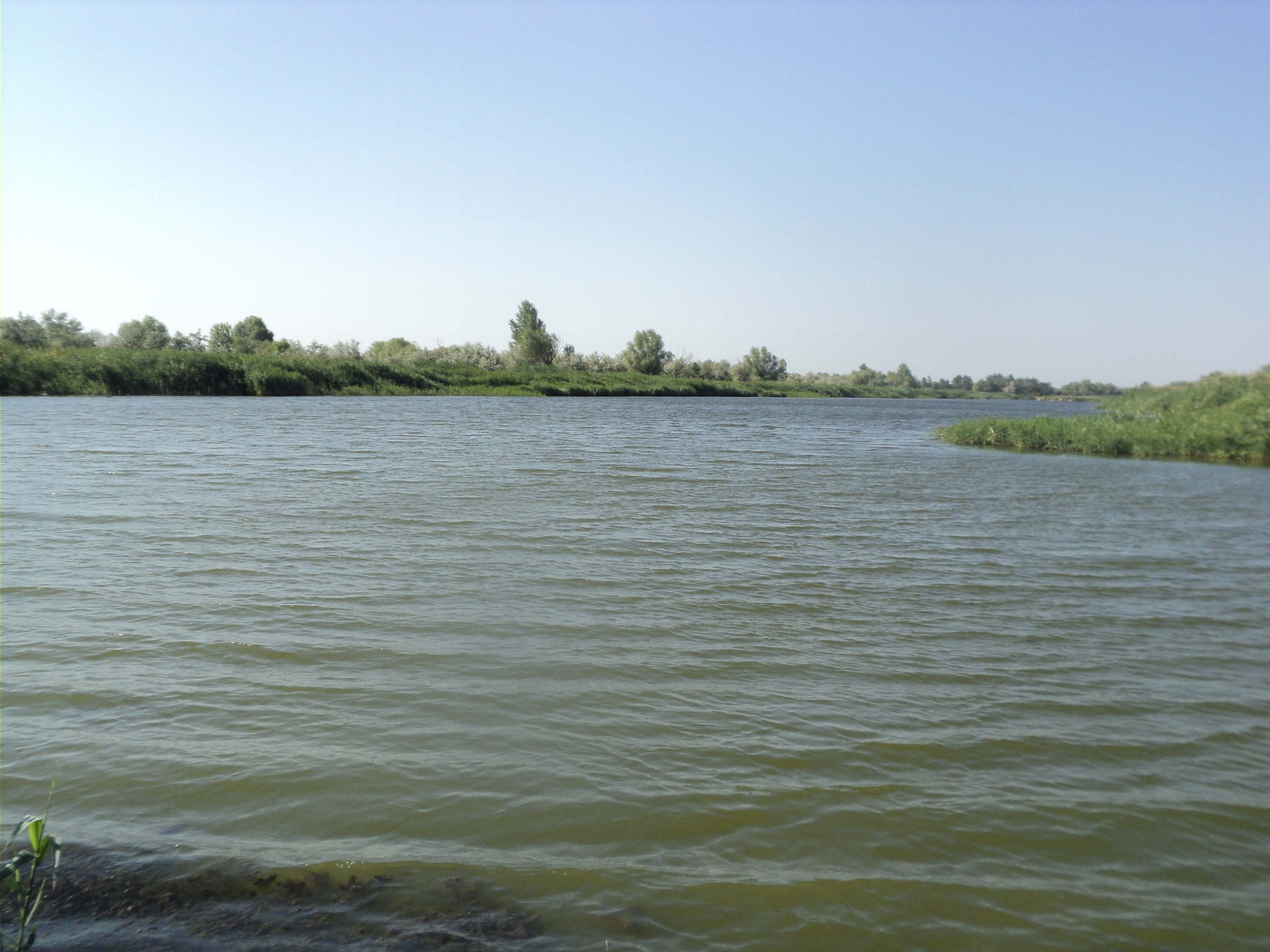
- Bazavluk river viewed from the dam on the river Dnieper

Location
- Country: Ukraine

Physical characteristics
- Mouth: Dnieper
  - location: Kakhovka Reservoir
  - coordinates: 47°35′05″N 34°04′43″E
- Length: 157 km (98 mi)
- Basin size: 4,200 km^{2} (1,600 sq mi)

Basin features
- Progression: Dnieper→ Dnieper–Bug estuary→ Black Sea
- Tributaries
  - right: Kamianka

The Bazavluk (Ukrainian: Базавлук) is a river in Ukraine and a right tributary of the Dnieper. It is 157 kilometres (98 mi) long and its basin area is 4,200 square kilometres (1,622 sq mi). It is shallow and dries up frequently.
