= 61st Guards Rifle Division =

- Active: 1943–1946
- Country: Soviet Union
- Branch: Red Army
- Type: Division
- Role: Infantry
- Engagements: Operation Little Saturn; Operation Gallop; Third Battle of Kharkov; Donbas Strategic Offensive (August 1943); Battle of the Dniepr; Nikopol–Krivoi Rog Offensive; Odessa Offensive; First Jassy-Kishinev Offensive; Second Jassy-Kishinev Offensive; Budapest Offensive; Operation Spring Awakening; Nagykanizsa–Körmend Offensive; Vienna Offensive
- Decorations: Order of the Red Banner
- Battle honours: Slavyansk

Commanders
- Notable commanders: Maj. Gen. Mikhail Borisovich Anashkin; Maj. Gen. Leonid Nikolaievich Lozanovich; Col. Pyotr Ivanovich Kasatkin; Maj. Gen. Konstantin Alekseevich Sergeev

The 61st Guards Rifle Division was formed as an elite infantry division of the Red Army in January, 1943, based on the 2nd formation of the 159th Rifle Division, and served in that role until after the end of the Great Patriotic War.

The division was formed in the 3rd Guards Army of Southwestern Front and immediately continued operations in the Soviet winter counteroffensive. In the spring of the year the Front was forced over to the defensive, but by August the division was part of the 34th Guards Rifle Corps of the same Army, fighting into the Donbas and towards the Dniepr River and winning a battle honor in the process. In late October 3rd Guards Army was moved to 4th Ukrainian Front and the 61st Guards helped force several crossings of that river in the Zaporozhe area. During the winter it took part in the fighting around Nikopol and Krivoi Rog in the Dniepr bend before being reassigned, with its Corps, to the 6th Army in the 3rd Ukrainian Front. In April, as that Army advanced towards the Dniestr River the division was awarded the Order of the Red Banner for its part in the liberation of Odessa. When the final offensive that drove Romania out of the Axis began the 61st Guards was in the 66th Rifle Corps of 37th Army, still in 3rd Ukrainian Front. In November, as the campaigns into the Balkan states continued the division made its final transfer, to the 6th Guards Rifle Corps of 57th Army, still in 3rd Ukrainian Front. It ended the war advancing into Austria, was moved to Romania postwar, and was disbanded in December, 1946.

== Formation ==
The 159th was redesignated as the 61st Guards on January 15 and officially received its Guards banner on February 21. Once the division completed its reorganization its order of battle was as follows:

- 181st Guards Rifle Regiment (from 491st Rifle Regiment)
- 187th Guards Rifle Regiment (from 558th Rifle Regiment)
- 189th Guards Rifle Regiment (from 631st Rifle Regiment)
- 129th Guards Artillery Regiment (from 597th Artillery Regiment)
- 67th Guards Antitank Battalion (from 136th Antitank Battalion)
- 77th Guards Antiaircraft Battery (until May 23, 1943)
- 62nd Guards Reconnaissance Company
- 70th Guards Sapper Battalion
- 88th Guards Signal Battalion (later 88th Guards Signal Company)
- 65th Guards Medical/Sanitation Battalion
- 63rd Guards Chemical Defense (Anti-gas) Company
- 59th Guards Motor Transport Company
- 60th Guards Field Bakery
- 64th Guards Divisional Veterinary Hospital
- 1667th Field Postal Station
- 1087th Field Office of the State Bank

Maj. Gen. Mikhail Borisovich Anashkin, who had led the 159th since mid-August, remained in command of the division until February 12, shortly before he was assigned to command the new 19th Rifle Corps. He was replaced by Maj. Gen. Leonid Nikolaievich Lozanovich who would remain in command until December, 1944.

=== Fighting for Voroshilovgrad ===
When redesignated the 159th was under command of the 14th Rifle Corps and it would remain under that headquarters into February. On January 8 the commander of Southwestern Front, Col. Gen. N. F. Vatutin, had reported to the STAVKA on his plans to further develop the winter counteroffensive:

The enemy along the Morozovskii and Shakhty axes is completing the withdrawal of his defeated forces behind the Northern Donets... The 3rd Guards Army, additionally reinforced with the 2nd and 23rd Tank Corps and the 346th Rifle Division, is to launch its main attack with the forces of the 59th and 60th Guards Rifle Divisions, the 266th Rifle Division, the 94th Rifle Brigade, and the 23rd and 24th Tank Corps... along the front Sharpaevka - Gusynka toward the front Verkhnyaya Tarasovka - Glubokii, and then in the direction of Gundorovskaya and Krasnyi Sulin.

By the beginning of February the 3rd Guards Army held a bridgehead over the Northern Donets River south of Voroshilovgrad from which it broke out in a drive to liberate that city. In the plan for the offensive the 14th Rifle Corps (now consisting of the 14th and 61st Guards Divisions) was not part of the Army's shock group but was instead to reach a line from Georgievskoe to Orekhova to Semeikino to guard its flank from any attack from the southwest. By February 4 the 14th Corps, supported by the 169th Tank Brigade, was operating in the area of heights 207, 202.8 and 206.9. Two days later German forces counterattacked the 61st Guards but were repelled; on February 7 a more powerful attack was made by elements of the 3rd SS Panzer Division supported by 40 tanks which broke through the Soviet front and captured Orlovka, Belo-Skelevatyi and Nizhnii and Verkhnii Gabun. This attack brought the advance on Voroshilovgrad to a halt.

At 0500 hours on February 12 the 14th Corps renewed its offensive. The 558th Rifle Regiment of the 61st Guards, along with the training battalion of 14th Guards and two battalions of the 229th Rifle Brigade, attacked the German garrisons in Belo-Skelevatyi and Orlovka and drove them out with heavy casualties. At the same time the 14th Guards seized the village of Popovka and the Corps as a whole began advancing rapidly to the southwest, with the 61st Guards reaching a line from Glafirovka to the Karl Liebknecht State Farm by the end of February 14. On the morning of the same day the fighting for the city proper had begun and by evening it was completely in Soviet hands. The advance of 3rd Guards Army continued over the next week; on the morning of February 21 General Vatutin reported, in part, that the 61st (which was now in 18th Rifle Corps) and 60th Guards Divisions, 279th Rifle Division, and the 229th Rifle Brigade had conducted a regrouping overnight and into the morning before going over to the attack from Kripaki and Smelyi toward Krivorozhe in the evening. Vatutin and the STAVKA had every intention of pressing on towards Stalino, but on February 20 the German 4th and 1st Panzer Armies began the counteroffensive that would become the Third Battle of Kharkov. While this was primarily aimed at Voronezh Front, Southwestern Front also faced attacks and the overall crisis made any further Soviet advance impossible.

== Into Ukraine ==
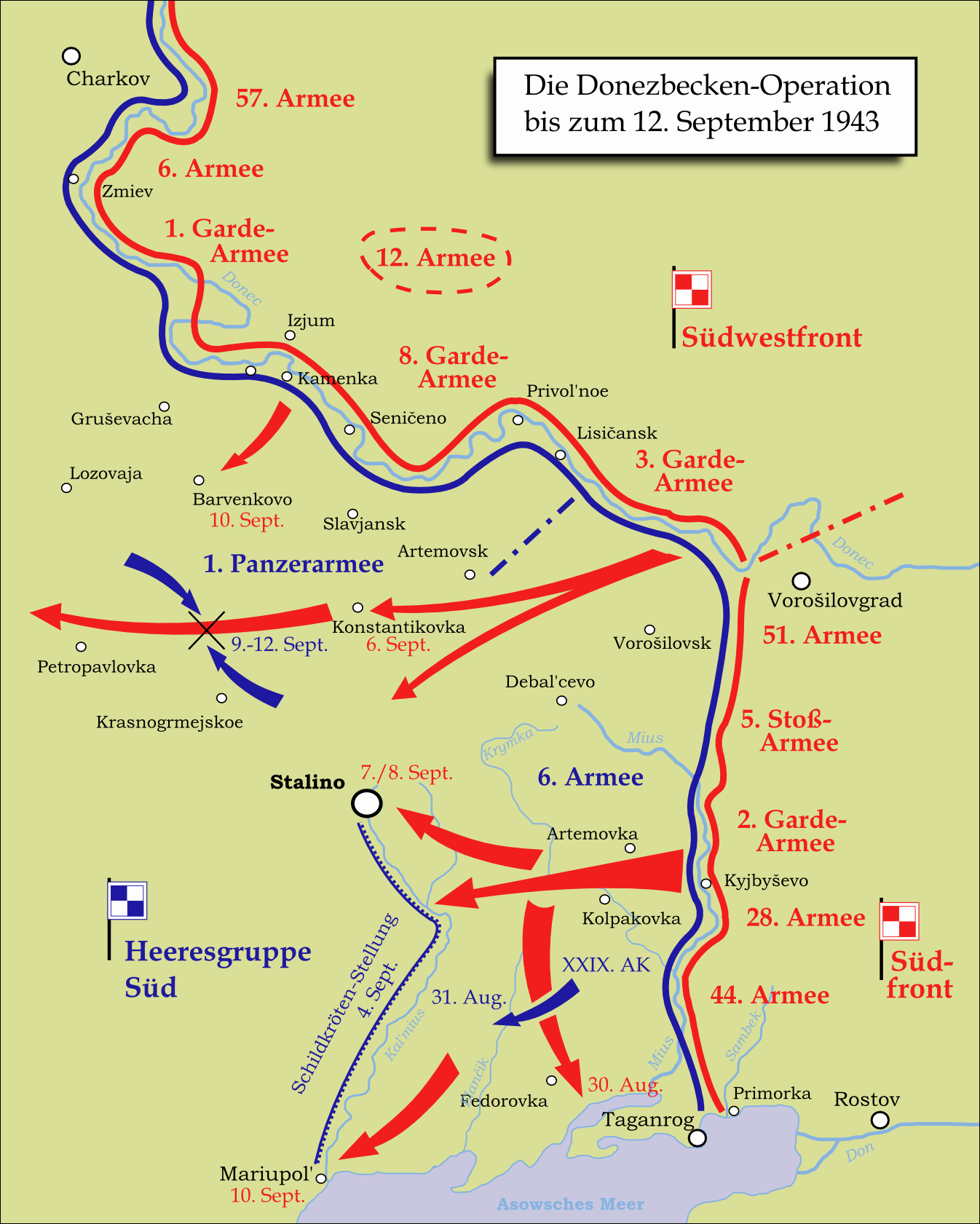
Map of the Donbas Offensive (in German)

By the beginning of March the division had returned to 14th Rifle Corps, where it remained into April when it was transferred to the 34th Guards Rifle Corps; it would remain under this command for the next 13 months. During the pause in operations during the spring of 1943 the division was substantially rebuilt and in June it was noted that 95 percent of its personnel were of Kazakh nationality, with the remainder mostly Russian.

When the Donbas Offensive began on August 13 the 61st Guards helped 3rd Guards Army force a crossing of the Donets. Following this it drove across the eastern Ukrainian plains towards Dniepropetrovsk and the Dniepr bend. During this advance, on September 8 the division was awarded an honorific:

SLAVYANSK... 61st Guards Rifle Division (Major General Lozanovich, Leonid Nikolaievich)... The troops who participated in the liberation of Slavyansk and nearby towns, by the order of the Supreme High Command of 8 September 1943, and a commendation in Moscow, are given a salute of 20 artillery salvoes from 224 guns.

By the beginning of October the division had just run up against a bridgehead that the German forces were attempting to hold on the east bank of the Dniepr east of Zaporozhe. The STAVKA demanded that this bridgehead be eliminated as quickly as possible. The Front commander, Army Gen. R. Ya. Malinovsky, asked for and was granted the use of the 8th Guards Army for this purpose, stating that with it he could take the objective "in two days". The attack began at 2200 hours on the night of October 13 with 8th Guards in the center, 12th Army advancing from the north and 3rd Guards Army from the south. Malinovsky met his deadline with time to spare as 1st Panzer Army's forces abandoned Zaporozhe, destroying the dam and the railway bridge as they withdrew to the west bank.

Following the Zaporozhe bridgehead battle the 3rd Guards Army was transferred to the 4th Ukrainian Front. This Front had begun a new offensive against the German 6th Army on October 9 with the objectives of liberating Melitopol and cutting off the German 17th Army in the Crimea. The fighting for Melitopol continued until October 23, after which two of the Front's armies drove west across the Nogay Steppe, splitting 6th Army in two. The northern portion fell back toward the Dniepr, forming a bridgehead south of Nikopol which was soon invested by 3rd Guards Army on the right (north) flank of the Front. During November substantial German reserves were moved into the bridgehead in anticipation of an offensive to restore communications with Crimea. This came to nothing in the face of Soviet threats elsewhere, but the bridgehead remained strongly held.

=== Nikopol-Krivoi Rog Offensive ===
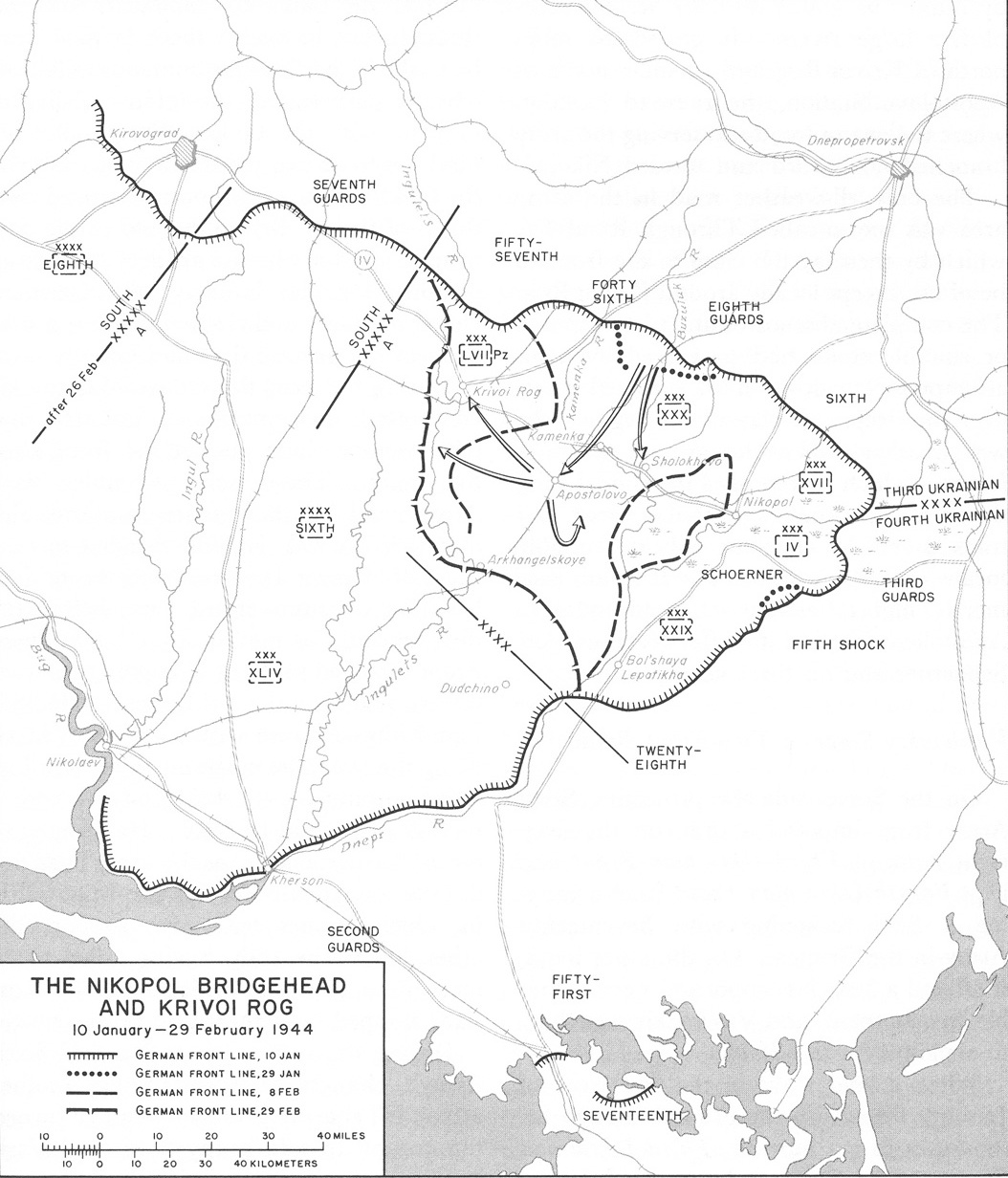
Nikopol-Krivoi Rog Offensive.

A cold wave in the first week of January, 1944 firmed up the ground enough for the 4th and 3rd Ukrainian Fronts to begin moving against the remaining German positions in the Dniepr bend. 3rd Ukrainian began its assault on January 10, but this had largely failed by the 13th. On the same day the 4th Ukrainian attacked the bridgehead but made minimal gains before both Fronts called a halt on January 16. The offensive was renewed on January 30 against a bridgehead weakened by transfers and 4th Ukrainian drove a deep wedge into its south end. On February 4 the German 6th Army ordered the bridgehead to be evacuated. Later that month the 34th Guards Corps, along with the 61st Guards, was transferred to the 6th Army in 3rd Ukrainian Front.

=== Battle for Odessa ===
With the diversion of 4th Ukrainian Front into the Crimea, 3rd Ukrainian took up the southern flank as the Red Army pressed onward into western Ukraine. On March 26 General Malinovsky ordered a renewed offensive in the direction of Odessa, which included the 6th Army. At this time the 34th Guards Corps consisted of the 61st and 59th Guards and 243rd Rifle Divisions. On April 4 Cavalry-Mechanized Group Pliyev and the lead elements of 37th Army captured the town of Razdelnaia, again splitting German 6th Army in two. 6th Army was now ordered to envelop Odessa from the northwest. After heavy fighting the 5th Shock Army entered the city's northern suburbs on the evening of April 9. Overnight the forward elements of 8th Guards Army, 6th Army, and the Pliyev Group also drew up to the Odessa defenses. With the Soviet trap closing the German LXXII Army Corps began breaking out to the west, allowing the Soviet forces to liberate the city by 1000 hours on April 10 after only minor fighting. On April 20 the 61st Guards would be awarded the Order of the Red Banner for its part in the fighting for Odessa.

=== First Jassy-Kishinev Offensive ===
Once the 6th Army completed its part in the liberation of Odessa, Malinovsky ordered it to spend a week resting and refitting west of the city and then to move west to the Dniestr to reinforce the Front's advance on Chișinău. On about April 14 the Army commander, Lt. Gen. I. T. Shlemin, received orders to move across the river to occupy positions south of Tiraspol that had been vacated by the 6th Guards Rifle Corps of 37th Army. The Army's immediate objectives would be the German strongholds at Fantina-Mascui and Grădinița and the 8km of front between them. For a variety of reasons Shlemin's forces were delayed in making their crossing and their offensive was delayed until April 25. 6th Army faced a battlegroup formed from the German 15th Infantry Division.

When finally prepared for action 34th Guards Corps was deployed with the 59th and 61st Guards in the first echelon opposite the boundary between the 15th Infantry battlegroup and the 97th Jäger Division at and north of Grădinița; the 243rd Rifle Division was in second echelon. Led by assault battalions formed by the first-echelon divisions the Corps began its assault at 0200 hours following a 15-minute fire raid on the German positions. The 59th and 61st captured the forward defensive positions of the 97th Jägers and advanced roughly 1.5km westward by the end of the day but were unable to seize the strongpoint at Grădinița. Repeated assaults over the next three days fared no better and the Corps was ordered to go over to the defense on April 29.

== Second Jassy-Kishinev Offensive ==
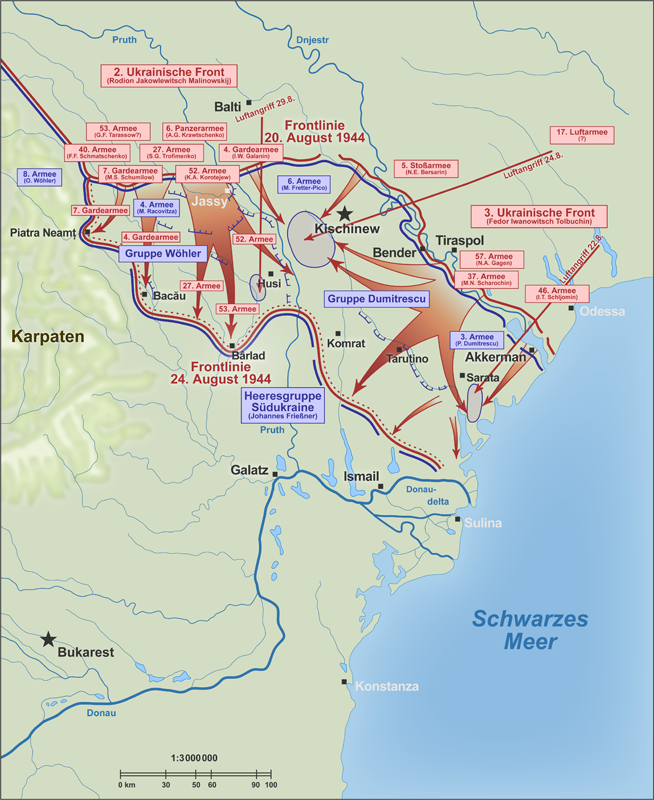
Map of Second Jassy-Kishinev Offensive (in German). Note position of 37th Army.

In May the 6th Army was disbanded and the 61st Guards was transferred to the 66th Rifle Corps of 37th Army, still in 3rd Ukrainian Front.

During the new offensive, which began on August 20, 37th Army's immediate objective was to break through the enemy's heavily fortified defensive zone so the Army's mobile group, 7th Mechanized Corps, could be committed into a clean breach. Two of 66th Corps' divisions (61st Guards and 333rd Rifle Division) were in first echelon and the 244th Rifle Division was behind the 333rd. The Corps was backed by a total of two artillery brigades, a mortar brigade, a howitzer regiment, two anti-tank regiments plus an additional battalion, a Guards Mortar regiment, a tank and a self-propelled artillery regiment, plus combat engineer elements. The 61st was on the right flank and was deployed in two echelons, with the 181st and 189th Guards Regiments up and the 187th back. The Corps was to launch its main attack in the general direction of height 151.7 and height 210.4 and break through the German defense between Fantina-Mascui and a grove 2km east of height 151,7 with the immediate task of capturing the crest line east of Cîrnățeni. By the end of the second day the Corps was to occupy a line from Căușeni to Opaci.

37th Army's offensive began with a reconnaissance-in-force by five penal companies with significant artillery support at 0500 hrs on August 20. The main artillery preparation began at 0800, and continued for 105 minutes. As early as 1030 hours the defenders had lost the first and second trenches of their first defensive position. The 61st captured height 151.7 and Fantina-Mascui by 1100 hours but then came under heavy small arms fire from Plop-Știubei and several counterattacks from Cîrnățeni which delayed the progress of the division's right-flank regiment. Meanwhile, the 189th Guards Regiment on the left flank continued to advance and by 1300 hours had captured some houses in the ravine southeast of Plop-Știubei. Due to this resistance the division was forced to deploy with its front facing northwest.

Meanwhile the 333rd Division, with armor support, had broken through the Germans' first and second positions and reached their third position southeast of Cîrnățeni, where the division ran into resistance from the remnants of the German 306th Infantry Division. The fight lasted about an hour until these forces were destroyed. Taking advantage of this success, at 1330 hours General Lozanovich committed his 187th Guards Regiment from second echelon into the fighting in the direction of height 210.4. By 1800 hours the Regiment had reached the southern outskirts of Cîrnățeni where it engaged elements of the 15th Infantry Division's 100th Infantry Regiment, which had just arrived from Ursoaia. An hour later the 189th Regiment, in conjunction with the 187th and heavily supported by direct-fire artillery, attacked Cîrnățeni and captured this stronghold after a short but bitter fight. Following this the two regiments advanced to the eastern slopes of height 137.3, while the 181st Guards Regiment on the right outflanked Plop-Știubei from the southeast, cut off the German battalion defending it, and destroyed it by the end of the day.

Late in the day the German 6th Army brought up the 93rd Motorized Regiment and a battalion of tanks from the 13th Panzer Division (up to 35 tanks and assault guns) to the area from height 133.6 to Căușeni Hill in order to halt the further advance of 66th Corps with the help of the routed units of the 15th and 306th Divisions. In order to counter this increased resistance the 66th Corps released the 244th Rifle Division from second echelon. Overnight the Corps attempted to continue the offensive with special detachments but these were generally not successful. The next morning the 7th Mechanized Corps was tasked with entering the breach in the German defenses at 0600 hours while the 66th Corps was ordered to advance in the direction of Căușeni Hill and Opaci, outflanking Căușeni from the south, and by the end of the day to capture the line from Sălcuța to Tokuz. Following several attacks the 61st Guards captured height 138.6 but was unable to take Căușeni, which had been made into a powerful strongpoint with the addition of two regiments of the German 384th Infantry Division. In order to prepare for a deliberate assault the 181st Regiment secured the Corps' right flank along a line from Plop-Știubei to Cîrnățeni while the 187th and 189th Regiments took up positions on the approaches to Căușeni Vek from the south.

With the German line breached by 37th Army, in the evening of August 21 the STAVKA issued Order No. 00442, assigning a mission of "beating off the enemy rearguards, throwing them back to the north and, by the close of 22 August... [to] capture the Sălcuța -- Taraclia -- Kenbaran -- Saka River area with the rifle formations." The division launched a night attack which cleared the defenders out of Căușeni Vek and threw them back across the swampy flood plain of the Botna River in the direction of Zaim. Having pushed back the German forces from the Căușeni to Opaci to Manzyr line the Army's forces went over to the pursuit along its entire front, although German resistance increased somewhat later in the day. By the end of the day, owing to the 57th Army lagging behind, the 61st Guards was pulled back into reserve behind the Corps' right flank in the Sălcuța area. Overnight the Axis Chișinău grouping began falling back to the west as it was faced with encirclement. At 0400 hours on August 23 the 66th Corps was transferred to 57th Army, along with the 398th Guards Self-Propelled Artillery Regiment (mixed SU-152s and IS-2 heavy tanks) and four artillery and mortar regiments, and was ordered to capture a line from Căinari to Gangura to Cărbuna to Sagaidac by the end of the day while a forward detachment occupied Răzeni.

On August 24 the 3rd and 2nd Ukrainian Fronts completed the encirclement of the Chișinău grouping, which made desperate efforts to break out over the following days. A favorable situation soon arose to split part of this force and the 66th and 9th Guards Rifle Corps converged on the village of Gura Galbenei from the east and north respectively and foiled a breakthrough attempt. By the end of August 27 the German 6th Army, which made up the bulk of the grouping, had been defeated and destroyed. 66th Corps now joined in the exploitation towards the Prut River and soon into Romania, which had left the Axis following a coup d'état on August 24. By September 1 the 61st Guards and its 66th Corps had rejoined the 37th Army.

== Into the Balkans ==
In October the division was transferred to the 6th Guards Rifle Corps, still in 37th Army; it would remain under this Corps command for the duration of the war. By this time the Army was in the Yambol region of Bulgaria, which had also left the Axis. From there the Corps entrained for the Belgrade region of Yugoslavia where it unloaded on November 2 at the Pirot and Tservonarevka railroad stations and began a route march towards Paraćin. At 0800 hours on November 7 the Corps headquarters was attacked in error by bombers of the USAAF; the Corps commander, Lt. Gen. G. P. Kotov, was among the 30 men killed, and 38 more were wounded.

The 37th Army was soon reassigned as an occupation force for the southern Balkans and the 6th Guards Corps, now consisting of the 20th and 61st Guards Rifle and 10th Guards Airborne Divisions, was transferred on November 12 to the 57th Army, where it would remain for the duration. Two days later General Lozanovich was relieved of his command of the division for "the loss of command of the units, lack of control, ignorance of the situation, and the loss of material artillery". He was replaced by Col. Pyotr Ivanovich Kasatkin on November 15. In addition to 6th Guards Corps the 57th Army also received the 9th Breakthrough Artillery Division from 37th Army.

=== Hungarian Operations ===
At this time 57th Army was the only army available to 3rd Ukrainian Front to force a crossing of the Danube in preparation for a drive on Budapest. The most favorable sectors were in the Mohács and Batina areas, but at both the river was from 250m - 800m wide and the east bank was dominated by heights on the west bank. The Army was also facing shortages of crossing equipment. The initial crossings were to be made by the 64th and 75th Rifle Corps with the 6th Guards Corps in reserve to develop the offensive in the direction of Pécs and Oroszló. When the crossing operations began on November 9 the Corps, still in 37th Army, was in the Belgrade area, with the 61st Guards located at Grocka. On November 15 the Front commander, Marshal F. I. Tolbukhin, ordered that no later than November 22 the 6th Guards Corps was to be concentrated on west bank of the Danube to develop the offensive by November 26 to the northwest. At this time the Corps was still moving up to the crossing areas, with 10th Guards Airborne in the lead. By the end of November 18 the 61st Guards had passed through Zmajevo. In further orders on November 22 Tolbukhin directed the Corps to cross to the west bank overnight to secure the right flank of the bridgehead in preparation for the 4th Guards Army entering it four days later. By the end of November 24 the 61st Guards was at the crossing point at Batina.

On November 28 the Axis forces, attempting to disrupt the advance of the 32nd Guards Mechanized Brigade and elements of 6th Guards Corps in the direction of Pécs, staged several counterattacks towards Máriakéménd but these were successfully repulsed. By the following day Axis resistance was largely crushed and by day's end the combined Soviet force had taken Pécs while the 6th Guards Corps continued to the outskirts of Pogány. Over 20 days of fighting the Front had won an operational bridgehead over the Danube and created an opportunity for an offensive on Budapest as well as towards Nagykanizsa. On November 30 the Front gained up to 28km, and as much as 26km the following day. As the advance continued, on December 4 Tolbukhin demanded that the main forces of 6th Guards Corps be shifted to the north of Nagybajom. Two days later the 57th Army was encountering increasing resistance as the Axis forces regrouped to try to hold the oilfields near Nagykanizsa.

Over the following days this resistance continued to intensify and during December 8 the 57th Army repulsed 23 counterattacks while engaged in heavy defensive fighting against infantry and tanks; 6th Guards Corps was holding a line in the area of Marcali and Nagyszakácsi. At this point the Army was facing the Hungarian Szent László Infantry Division and 3rd Cavalry Brigade, as well as the German Brandenburg Division and 13th SS Mountain Division Handschar. The Corps continued to consolidate its lines over the next two weeks while the 46th and 4th Guards Armies prepared for a new drive on December 20 to penetrate the "Margarita Line" and continue the advance on Budapest. 57th Army was ordered to remain on the defensive in order to cover the flank of this drive. By now the Corps had lost the 10th Guards Airborne, being replaced by the 19th and 113th Rifle Divisions.

Budapest was surrounded by December 26 and on January 1, 1945 the German Army Group South began relief operations which continued for most of the month. During one of the most crucial of these on January 20 the 3rd SS Panzer Division Totenkopf and 5th SS Panzer Division Wiking regrouped and then carried out a nighttime reconnaissance-in-force between the Danube and Lake Velence. This was followed at 0500 hours on January 21 by an assault that focused on the positions held by the 5th Guards Cavalry Corps, but a secondary thrust by up to a battalion of infantry backed by 17 tanks struck the 61st Guards in the direction of the Sárvíz River with the aim of tying down the 57th Army and preventing it being shifted to the Budapest axis. The attack broke into the division's first line of trenches but made little further progress due to strong antitank defenses. By the beginning of February, the 6th Guards Corps once again had the 61st and 20th Guards and 10th Guards Airborne divisions under command. During Operation Spring Awakening, which began on March 6, the 2nd Panzer Army made little progress against 57th Army before the Soviet forces went over to the counterattack.

On March 22 Colonel Kasatkin was replaced in command of the division by Col. Sergei Nikolaevich Lisenkov. Beginning on March 26 the 57th Army made the main offensive drive in the Nagykanizsa–Körmend Offensive, which continued until April 15. In the process, on March 30 elements of the division took part in the recapture of the town of Marcali and this was recognized in Moscow with a salute of 20 artillery salvoes from 224 guns. On April 9 Col. Konstantin Alekseevich Sergeev took over from Colonel Lisenkov, and was promoted to the rank of major general ten days later. The division ended the war advancing into western Austria.

== Postwar ==
At the time of the German surrender the personnel of the division shared the full title of 61st Guards Rifle, Slavyansk, Order of the Red Banner Division. (Russian: 61-я гвардейская стрелковая Славянская Краснознамённая дивизия.) 57th Army was made part of the Southern Group of Forces in June and returned to Romania where the division, still in 6th Guards Corps, was stationed at Brănești. On June 10, 1946 the 57th Army was redesignated as the 9th Mechanized Army, but in December the Corps was disbanded, along with the 61st Guards and the 126th Guards (former 10th Guards Airborne) Rifle Divisions.
