= 333rd Rifle Division =

333rd Rifle Division (August 20, 1941 – July 31, 1946)
- Active: 1941–1946
- Country: Soviet Union
- Branch: Red Army
- Type: Infantry
- Size: Division
- Engagements: Barvenkovo–Lozovaya Offensive; Second Battle of Kharkov; Operation Blue; Battle of Stalingrad; Operation Little Saturn; Donbass Strategic Offensive; Battle of the Dnieper; Nikopol–Krivoi Rog Offensive; Dnieper-Carpathian Offensive; First Jassy–Kishinev Offensive; Second Jassy–Kishinev Offensive
- Decorations: Order of the Red Banner; Order of Suvorov
- Battle honours: Sinelnikovo

Commanders
- Notable commanders: Col. Ivan Mikhailovich Afonin; Maj. Gen. Yakov Sergeevich Dashevskii; Col. Mitrofan Ilich Matveev; Maj. Gen. Anisim Mikhailovich Golosko

The 333rd Rifle Division began forming in the North Caucasus Military District in August, 1941, as a standard Red Army rifle division, as part of the massive mobilization of reserve forces very shortly after the German invasion. In 1942 it served in the late winter and early spring fighting near Kharkov, taking a beating both then and during the opening stages of the German summer offensive. Withdrawn into the reserves, the division was rebuilt in time to take part in the Soviet counteroffensive at Stalingrad in November, and played an important role in driving the German forces out of the Caucasus region during the winter. In the autumn of 1943 the division shared credit with the 25th Guards Rifle Division for the liberation of Sinelnikovo in the Dnipropetrovsk Oblast, receiving that place name as an honorific. After battling through Ukraine and into the Balkan states, the 333rd completed its combat path on a relatively quiet note doing garrison duties in the Balkans.

== Formation ==
The 333rd Rifle Division began forming at Kamyshin on the Volga, on August 20, 1941, in the North Caucasus Military District. Although the division received its first commander, Col. Ivan Mikhailovich Afonin, in late August, it was almost a month later before enough of a division had been organized that the Soviet general staff began to carry it even as a "forming" division. Its full order of battle was as follows:

- 1116th Rifle Regiment
- 1118th Rifle Regiment
- 1120th Rifle Regiment
- 897th Artillery Regiment
- 1st Antitank Battalion
- 396th Reconnaissance Company
- 614th Sapper Battalion
- 785th Signal Battalion (later 172nd Signal Company)
- 419th Medical/Sanitation Battalion
- 412th Chemical Defense (Anti-gas) Company
- 162nd Motor Transport Company
- 188th Field Bakery
- 757th Divisional Veterinary Hospital
- 361st Field Postal Station
- 789th Field Office of the State Bank

Ten percent of its personnel were older veterans while half were young recruits, and many were of non-Russian nationalities. It was originally intended to be assigned to 10th Army, which would have put it into the December counteroffensive south of Moscow. However, in late October the division was retained by 57th Army, in which it had been forming near Stalingrad, and it remained in reserve with that army until December.

== Combat service ==
In January, 1942, during the Soviet winter counteroffensive, the 333rd was transferred to 9th Army in Southern Front. It joined in attacks which broke into the German front on the northern Donets River, reaching the vicinity of Slavyansk before being halted by German counterattacks.

=== Second Battle of Kharkov ===
9th Army, and Southern Front in general, had no direct role in the Soviet offensive to liberate Kharkov in May, but still suffered significant casualties in the German counteroffensive against the salient based at Izium and Barvenkovo. As of May 11 the 333rd had two rifle regiments and most of its artillery regiment at the south shoulder of the salient near the German strongpoint of Maiaki, north of Slavyansk; the 1118th Rifle Regiment and a battalion of the artillery regiment was serving as 9th Army's reserve at Barvenkovo. From May 7–15, Southern Front made an unsuccessful attempt to take Maiaki using most of the 333rd plus much of the remaining 9th Army reserves, including 5th Cavalry Corps. Lt. Gen. I. K. Bagramyan, chief of staff of Southwestern Front, would later blame this action for the ensuing failure and disaster of the Kharkov offensive because it put those reserves in a position where they were unable to immediately react to the German counteroffensive which struck 9th Army on May 17.

This attack pierced the lines well west of Maiaki, and by the end of the day had captured most of Barvenkovo from the 1118th Regiment and units of the 34th Cavalry Division. The gunners of 897th Artillery Regiment showed considerable heroism on the approaches to the town. As enemy tanks neared, Senior Lieutenant Parokhin's battery opened fire. The lead tank was destroyed, which forced the tank column to halt. The battery then opened very heavy fire and put another nine tanks out of action. When the fighting reached the town, Sergeant Sukhonos' gun team destroyed four tanks by direct fire and forced the rest to retreat. Under cover of this antitank action by field artillery, the remnants of the 1118th Regiment withdrew to the northwest part of the town, which was shielded by the Sukhoi Torets River, and were supported by units of the 341st Rifle Division. Meanwhile, the main forces of the division, along with 51st Rifle Division, repelled enemy attacks aimed at crossings over the Northern Donets River in their sectors. Despite such local successes, by day's end the 9th Army had been shattered, with many elements partly or completely encircled.

On May 18, German mobile forces penetrated the 5th Cavalry Corps' positions at the juncture of 30th and 60th Cavalry Divisions and moved north towards Izium, leaving the 333rd in their wake. On the following day the 1118th Regiment, now backed by elements of 23rd Tank Corps, continued to resist at the junction of 9th and 57th Armies northwest of Barvenkovo, while main forces concentrated just west of Izium. The division was still in these positions on May 22 when the German forces closed the pocket, leaving the 1118th Regiment hopelessly encircled while the 1116th and 1120th Regiments remained in relative safety outside. On the 24th the latter regiments took up positions along the Donets to try to assist any Soviet troops trying to break through the corridor, but only small numbers were able to do so over the next several days.

=== Operation Blue ===
In June the division began rebuilding its 1118th Rifle Regiment, under command of Lt. Col. Pavel Mikhailovich Volosatykh; he would remain in command of the regiment for the next year. This had barely got underway when, in preparation for Operation Blue, First Panzer Army launched Operation Fridericus II on June 22. The 333rd was near the right flank of its army, due west of Izium, and within days was partly encircled but managed to extricate most of its forces. As Operation Blue began, the division found itself being chased across the steppes by German armor. By July 10 it was back in the rebuilding 57th Army, attempting to reinforce 38th Army in the Kantemirovka area and help rescue the encircled 28th Army, but its resources weren't close to adequate for this. By the night of July 11–12 the division was falling back to a new line nearer to the lower Don.

Not long after this, the much-depleted 333rd was pulled back into the Reserve of the Supreme High Command for rebuilding. The division came under the command of Colonel M.I. Matveev on July 26. As of August 31 it was in 4th Reserve Army, about 300 km northwest of Stalingrad; it was later transferred to 10th Reserve Army. On October 1 the STAVKA ordered the division to be assigned to the new Don Front, along with six other rebuilt rifle divisions. On October 22, a new Southwestern Front was formed, west of Don Front, and on the 25th the 333rd was transferred to this Front.

=== Operation Uranus ===
As the buildup to Operation Uranus continued, the division was assigned to 21st Army in Southwestern Front, along with the 277th and 293rd Rifle Divisions, also from 10th Reserve Army. 21st Army was assigned to build the inner ring of encirclement of the German forces at Stalingrad from the north, attacking from the bridgehead over the Don at Kletskaya. When the operation began on November 19, the 333rd was on the right flank of the second echelon of its Army, backing the 4th Tank Corps and 3rd Guards Cavalry Corps. The attack struck the Romanian 13th Infantry and 1st Cavalry Divisions, and soon began pushing them aside. On the following day, the division entered the breach and began exploiting to the southwest. On the morning of the 21st, the remaining forces of Romanian 3rd Army, in complete disarray, were formed, in theory, into Group Lascar, but this grouping was already nearly encircled by the right flank forces of 21st Army, in conjunction with the left flank of 5th Tank Army to the west. On November 21, the 333rd linked up with 50th Guards Rifle Division at Golovsky, and the Romanian forces were encircled. During the following days the division was retained to help liquidate Group Lascar, while other infantry elements of 21st Army continued to exploit the breakthrough. A column of about 8,000 Romanian troops, mostly from their 15th Infantry Division, under General Sion, managed to evade the 119th Rifle Division and cross the Tsaritsa River, with about 3,000 eventually linking up with 22nd Panzer Division. Meanwhile, the main Romanian force ceased fighting at 2320 hrs. on November 23, and over the next 12 hours over 27,000 officers and men surrendered.

With this duty done, the rifle divisions in the rear of 21st Army began closing up to the area of Kalach from the west to assist the struggling mobile corps in forming the inner ring of encirclement; by nightfall on the 24th the 333rd reached Malogolubaia, 24 km north of that town. However, 5th Tank Army was having difficulty establishing itself at, and crossing, the Chir River in the face of continuing resistance from XXXXVIII Panzer Corps and various scratch German/Romanian forces. 24 hours later, after clearing Romanian forces from the region southwest of Raspopinskaia, the division was reassigned to 5th Tank, and began marching south towards the Chir, reaching that line late on November 26 and joined there by 40th Guards and 321st and 258th Rifle Divisions from 65th Army. The 333rd joined 119th Rifle Division's attack on the German defenses outside the town of Surovikino, which continued until the end of the month. Battalion-sized assaults by the division against Group Schmidt's defenses forced Schmidt to withdraw roughly halfway back to the town. As the day progressed, the division slid one of its rifle regiments southeast towards Golovskii, 10 km southeast of the town, attempting to identify a weak spot in the German defenses and exploit it by pushing southward across the river. On November 29, Col. Matveev concentrated all three of his rifle regiments east of Surovikino and then moved them 8 km southwest along the bank of the Chir overnight. The next day, attacking at dawn, the division liberated Dmitrievka Station, 10 km southeast of Surovikino, and forced their way across the Chir to capture the villages of Golovkii and Ostrovskii, south of the river, from German Group Kortner. These positions were soon fortified, and proved deep enough to bring additional forces across the Chir.

By the beginning of December it had become clear to the STAVKA that the number of enemy troops encircled at Stalingrad was far greater than they had anticipated, that the pocket would not be liquidated quickly, and that attempts to relieve the pocket were likely. The closest German forces to the pocket were on the lower Chir, so Southwestern and Don Fronts were ordered to begin an offensive on December 7 and continue it until those forces were incapable of conducting a relief operation. The most important preliminary task was to enlarge the 333rd's bridgehead so that 1st Tank Corps could be concentrated in it. Accordingly, the division, along with 6th Guards Cavalry Division, liberated the villages of Savinskii and Lisinskii, doubling the width and depth of the bridgehead. When the Chir (Tormosin) Offensive began on the 7th, the 333rd was deployed with 1120th Rifle Regiment on the left, facing 1st Battalion of the German 336th Infantry Division's 687th Regiment; 1118th Regiment in the center, opposite 3rd Battalion of 686th Regiment; and 1116th Regiment on the right, facing battalion-sized Battlegroup von Buddenbroch from 7th German Air Force Field Division. 1st Tank Corps and 8th Motorcycle Regiment were formed up directly in the division's rear.

=== Battle for State Farm 79 ===
The offensive began promptly at 0900 hrs. when the 333rd quickly penetrated the boundary between Group Stahel's Group Schmidt and the 336th Infantry south of Ostrovskii. 1st Tank Corps rushed into the penetration, crushing Battlegroup von Buddenbroch, and advancing 6 to 7 km to occupy State Farm (Sovkhoz) No. 79, setting up an action that would become well known to English-speaking readers with the publication of von Mellenthin's Panzer Battles in the 1950s. By the end of the day, the tank brigades of 1st Tank put up all-round defenses on the outskirts of the sovkhoz, in anticipation of resuming the offensive the next day; meanwhile, its 44th Motorized Infantry Brigade had been left to assist the 333rd in its continuing efforts against the German 336th.

XXXXVIII Panzer Corps was alerted to the Soviet offensive shortly after it began; at the time it was off-loading elements of 11th Panzer Division at Tormosin. This division was ordered to counterattack the Soviet forces at the sovkhoz, moving into jumping-off positions overnight. Meanwhile, two battalions of the 44th Motorized Infantry were ordered to disengage from support of the 333rd and rejoin its parent corps. On the morning of December 8, these battalions were surprised by the 15th Panzer Regiment, and lost most of their trucks and equipment and many of their men in a two-hour fight; what was left was scattered to the winds. Later that day the rest of the Soviet tank corps was defeated at the state farm by 11th Panzer and forced to retreat back to the Ostrovskii bridgehead, where it joined with the 333rd in the face of German counterattacks on the 9th and 10th. On that second day, an attack by the 111th Panzer Grenadier Regiment, backed by about 50 tanks, drove northwards against the division's defenses, then eastwards, all the way to the western outskirts of Ostrovskii before being halted by elements of 1st Tank Corps, 8th Guards Tank Brigade, and a regiment from 47th Guards Rifle Division. Although these attacks shrank the bridgehead, they failed to crush it. Over the following days, the 47th Guards continued to reinforce the bridgehead while it was being contained by the 336th Infantry and elements of 11th Panzer while the rest of that division wore itself down to-ing and fro-ing across the steppes, trying to beat back other Soviet crossings of the Chir. On December 13, shortly after dawn, the 333rd and the other forces in the bridgehead launched a sudden, strong attack which broke through the boundary between 686th Infantry Regiment and the 110th Panzer Grenadier Regiment, encircling a battalion of the latter and creating a crisis for the panzer corps. A counterattack on the 14th relieved the encircled battalion, but this re-concentration of 11th Panzer allowed 5th Shock Army, to the east, to seize Rychkovskii and Verkhne-Chirskii, with relative ease. Since this area would have been the jumping-off point for a drive to relieve Stalingrad on this axis, the Soviet strategic objective had been met. 11th Panzer remained tied down at Ostrovskii until the 17th.

5th Tank Army played a subordinate role in Operation Little Saturn, which began on December 16. The army was to join the offensive as soon as the situation permitted. The division continued to hold its positions near Ostrovskii until December 30, when it began to advance again against the 336th Infantry. The Red Army General Staff's daily summary for the following day noted that the 333rd had re-liberated State Farm 79.

== Operations in Ukraine and the Balkans ==
The division remained in 5th Tank Army, in Southwestern Front, until April, 1943. In that month it was reassigned to 12th Army in the same Front. On April 5, 1943, the division came under the command of Col. Anisim Mikhailovich Golosko. He would remain in command for the duration, being promoted to Major General on September 15 of the same year.

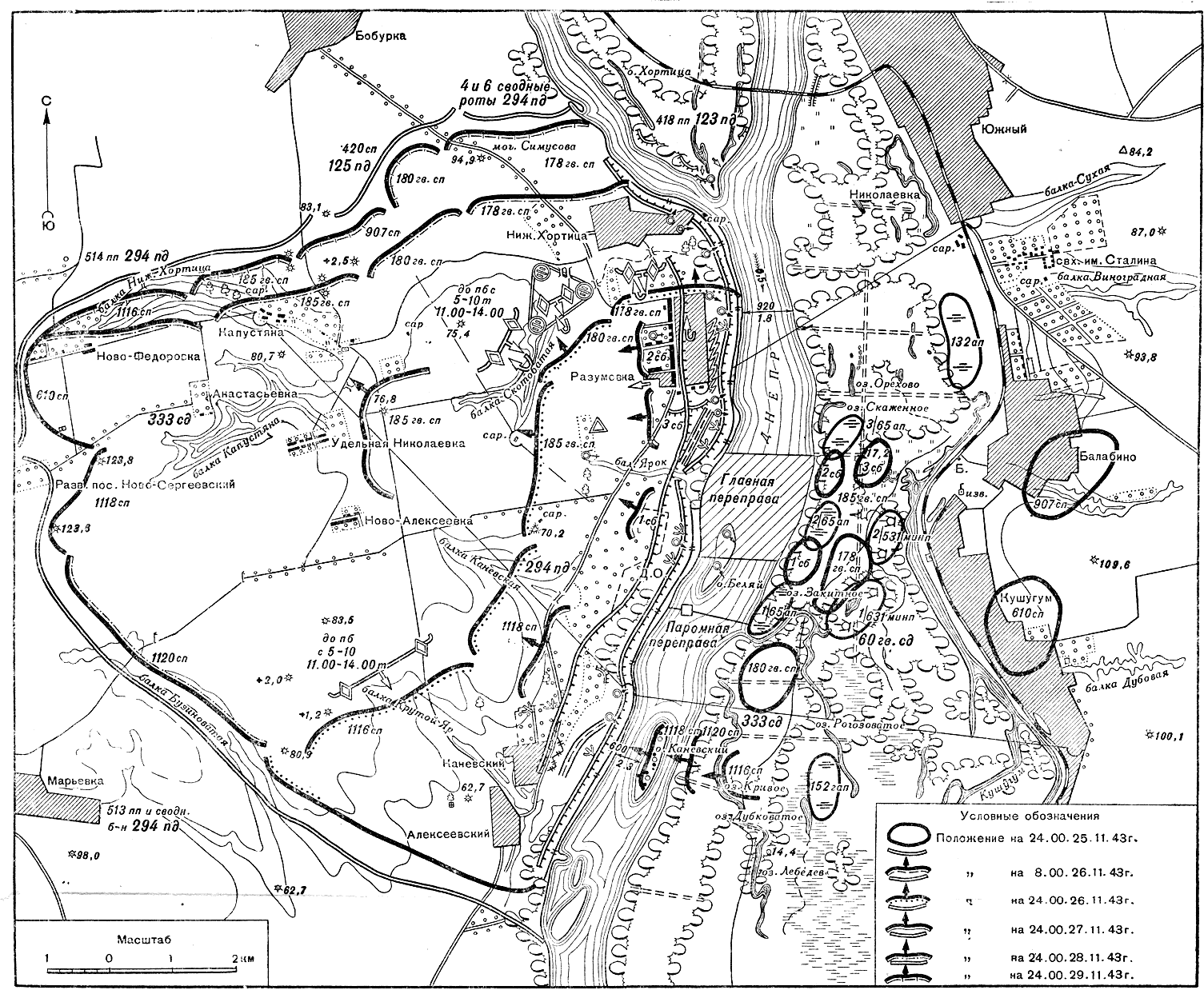
Crossing of the Dniepr by 60th Guards and 333rd Rifle Divisions, November 1943

Near the end of the Donbass Strategic Offensive, on September 21, 1943, the 333rd and the 25th Guards Rifle Division were jointly credited for the liberation of the city of Sinelnikovo, near Dnipropetrovsk, on the east side of the Dniepr, and received the city's name as an honorific. Not long after, on October 14 the division was awarded the Order of the Red Banner in recognition of its general meritorious service. In late October, Southwestern Front was renamed 3rd Ukrainian Front; the division would remain in this Front for the rest of its fighting career. The division received its second unit decoration, the Order of Suvorov, on February 13, 1944, in recognition of its service in the Dniepr battles and the liberation of Nikopol and Apostolove. As of April 1, during the advance on Odessa, the 333rd was in 6th Army, assigned to 66th Rifle Corps, where it would remain into the postwar. After the liberation of Odessa, 6th Army was ordered to spend about a week resting and refitting before moving west to the Dniestr River to reinforce the Front's advance on Kishinev. On about April 14, 6th Army was directed to cross the Dniestr and to occupy positions vacated by 6th Guards Rifle Corps in the central portion of 37th Army's bridgehead south of Tiraspol by day's end on April 18. In the event, this timetable proved too ambitious, and 6th Army's offensive was delayed until the morning of April 25.

"To expand the bridgehead, Lieutenant General Shlemin, the commander of the 6th Army, assigned the following missions: the 203rd and 333rd Rifle Divisions will penetrate the enemy's defenses along a front of three kilometres on the night of 24–25 April, capture the northern part of the village of Kyrpatseny, and subsequently reach the dominating [terrain] on Hill 141.1 [three km beyond]."

The sector was defended by a battle group of the German 15th Infantry Division. The assault battalions of the division began their attack at 0200 hrs. on April 25, following a short artillery raid of just 15 minutes due to lack of ammunition at the end of a long and waterlogged supply line. The 333rd managed to penetrate the forward German defenses, advance about 2 km, and capture the German strong point at Fantina-Mascui and the village of Plop-Shtube, but was then halted by intense German artillery and machine gun fire, as well as air strikes. German reserves launched counterattacks the next day which retook Plop-Shtube and generally brought the advance to a complete halt by April 29. Shortly afterwards, 6th Army was disbanded.

=== Second Jassy–Kishinev Offensive ===
As of June 1 the division, and the 66th Rifle Corps, were in the 37th Army, where they would remain for the duration of the war.

During the new offensive, which began on August 20, 37th Army's immediate objective was to break through the enemy's heavily fortified defensive zone so the Army's mobile group, 7th Mechanized Corps, could be committed into a clean breach. Two of 66th Corps' divisions (61st Guards and 333rd) were in first echelon and the 244th was behind the 333rd. The Corps was backed by a total of two artillery brigades, a mortar brigade, a howitzer regiment, two anti-tank regiments plus an additional battalion, a Guards Mortar regiment, a tank and a self-propelled artillery regiment, plus combat engineer elements. The 333rd was on the left flank. It was tasked with part of its forces to link up on the first day with 20th Guards Rifle Division of 57th Army to encircle a group of enemy forces:

"The 333rd Rifle Division had the following task: to destroy the enemy in the large woods southwest of Leontina, to launch an attack with part of its forces in the direction of the orchard near the fork in the roads northwest of the vineyard, as well as to capture such enemy strong points as height 151.7, Kaushany, the long grove southeast of Kirnatsen."

37th Army's offensive began with a reconnaissance-in-force by five penal companies with significant artillery support at 0500 hrs on August 20. The main artillery preparation began at 0800, and continued for 105 minutes. The 333rd, supported by tanks from the 5th Tank Regiment and self-propelled artillery from the 398th Guards SU Regiment (mixed SU-152s and IS-2 heavy tanks) broke through the enemy's first and second positions and reached his third position southeast of Kirnatsen, where the division ran into resistance from the remnants of the German 306th Infantry Division. This fight lasted about an hour until these forces were destroyed, and the 333rd pressed on towards height 199.5, along with its armor support.

By 1900 the division had captured this height and continued advancing southwest until it ran into heavy enemy resistance along its second defense zone, which ran along the line of height 133.6 - Kaushany Hill - Yermokliya. The 93rd Motorized Regiment and a battalion of tanks from the 4th Panzer Regiment of 13th Panzer Division (about 35 tanks and assault guns) had been brought up to the high ground to try to close the breach in the defenses. There they were joined by routed elements of the 15th and 306th Infantry Divisions. At 2300 the 244th was committed from second echelon to attack alongside the 333rd against enemy positions on Kaushany Hill, but this was unsuccessful, bringing 66th Corps to a halt for that day. The divisions consolidated on the southeastern slopes to prepare to resume the offensive the next day.

The Soviet plan for August 21 was for the 7th Mechanized to enter a breach from Kaushany to Yermokliya, while the German plan was to stop or delay this at all costs. Because it dominated the terrain in all directions, Kaushany Hill (210.4 metres) had the strongest engineering defenses in the second zone. 66th Corps renewed its offensive at 0600 behind powerful artillery fire, mostly from guns firing over open sights, but soon had to contend with armored counterattacks. The 333rd faced two enemy infantry regiments, backed by 20 - 25 tanks and assault guns, attacking from the Yermokliya area from 0700 to 1200 hrs. These were beaten off with heavy losses, and then the division went back to the offensive:

"From the north, a battalion from the 1116th Rifle Regiment, in conjunction with a battalion from the 1120th Rifle Regiment and, supported by 15 tanks from the 5th Tank Regiment, got into the flank of the enemy defending Kaushany Hill, thus creating a threat to encircle him. Then both battalions, along with the 1116th Rifle Regiment's main forces attacking the height from the front, simultaneously attacked the enemy on the height from two sides, and following a fierce battle, kicked him off the hill and captured it. The enemy's minefields and wire obstacles on the height were overcome by the infantry after the engineer troops' obstacle clearing groups made passages in them. The enemy lost up to 500 soldiers and officers killed alone in the fighting for this hill. Besides this, units of the 333rd Rifle Division destroyed up to 20 machine guns, knocked out 12 guns, eight assault guns, and four tanks. Upon capturing this height, the division gained operational freedom and took up pursuit of the enemy."

By the end of the day the 1116th Regiment had reached the northeastern slopes of height 208.1, facing northwest; the 1120th Regiment was on the southern slopes of the same hill, also facing northwest; and the 1118th Regiment was on both sides of the road northeast of height 207.2.

Overnight, the division captured the village of Opach with the help of forward detachments of the 244th. This victory fully opened the gap in the German front, a breakthrough which would lead to the encirclement and elimination of the Treger battlegroup; already 13th Panzer Division had lost half its personnel and was down to just 15 tanks, and 37th Army in two days had advanced 25 – 30 km through a breach 30 km wide. On August 22, as 7th Mechanized raced ahead, the 333rd was ordered to capture Salkutsa by the end of the day. After a two-hour battle the 1118th Regiment took height 166.0. Meanwhile, the 1116th and 1120th Regiments encountered heavy fire from the area of Zaim; this was suppressed by fire from one battalion of the 1116th while the rest of the two regiments carried on to Salkutsa. This advance was met with heavy small arms and artillery fire from the eastern outskirts of the village, which brought it to a halt. General Golosko decided to use a single battalion of the 1120th to provide covering fire as its regiment and the 1116th attacked from the northeast, while the 1118th came in from the south; the 913rd Rifle Regiment of the 244th also took part in this attack. The enemy forces in Salkutsa were soon destroyed. Over the coming days the 333rd would join in the fighting that would dismantle the Axis forces in eastern Romania, and the advance towards Bucharest.

== Postwar ==
At the end of 1944 37th Army became a separate, or "independent" army, meaning that it was not part of any Front. In this role it, and its component units, were out of contact with the German forces and served as garrison troops in the Balkans until the German surrender. At the time of the German surrender in May, 1945, the men and women of the division carried the full title of 333rd Rifle, Sinelnikovo, Order of the Red Banner, Order of Suvorov Division (Russian: 333-я стрелковая Синельниковская Краснознамённая ордена Суворова дивизия). The division initially became part of the Southern Group of Forces with the 66th Rifle Corps. In the summer of 1945 it moved to the Odessa Military District with the corps and was disbanded there on July 31, 1946.
