= Fîrlădeni =

Fîrlădeni may refer to several places:

- Fîrlădeni, a commune in Căușeni District
- Fîrlădeni, a commune in Hîncești District
