= Marianca =

Marianca may refer to one of two places in Moldova:

- Marianca de Jos, a commune in Ștefan Vodă District
- Marianca de Sus, a village in Zaim Commune, Căușeni District
