= Baimaclia =

Baimaclia may refer to:

- Baimaclia, Cantemir, a commune in Cantemir District
- Baimaclia, Căuşeni, a commune in Căușeni District
