= Baccealia =

- Commune
- Location within Moldova
- Coordinates: 46°42′30″N 29°15′00″E
- Country: Moldova
- District: Căușeni

Government
  - Mayor: Svetlana Țîbîrna (PLDM)

Population (2014)
  - Total: 2,087
- Time zone: UTC+2 (EET)
  - Summer (DST): UTC+3 (EEST)
- Website: baccealia.primarie.md

Baccealia is a commune in Căușeni District, Moldova. It is composed of four villages, Baccealia, Florica, Plop and Tricolici. Florica and Plop were moved in subordination to this communes on 12 April 2011; previously they were part of commune of Coșcalia.
