= Plopi =

Plopi ("poplars") may refer to:

- Plopi, a village in Mărașu Commune, Brăila County, Romania
- Plopi, a village in Puieşti Commune, Buzău County, Romania
- Plopi, a village in Valea Ierii Commune, Cluj County, Romania
- Plopi, a village in Bretea Română Commune, Hunedoara County, Romania
- Plopi, a village in Tâmna Commune, Mehedinţi County, Romania
- Plopi, a village in Beuca Commune, Teleorman County, Romania
- Plopi, a village in Bunești-Averești Commune, Vaslui County, Romania
- Plopi, Cantemir, a commune in Cantemir district, Moldova
- Plopi, Transnistria, a commune in Transnistria, Moldova

== See also ==
- Plop (disambiguation)
- Plopu (disambiguation)
- Plopiș (disambiguation)
