= Petru Cărare =

Moldovan writer (1935–2019)

Petru Cărare OR
- Born: 13 February 1935; Zaim, Tighina County, Kingdom of Romania
- Died: 27 May 2019 (aged 84)
- Education: Moldova State University
- Awards: Laureat al Premiului Național (2000); Order of the Republic (Moldova) (2010)

Petru Cărare (13 February 1935 – 27 May 2019) was a writer from Moldova.

Petru Cărare was born to Profir Cărare and Nadejda Duca. He was forbidden to publish in the 1970s. He translated works by Ivan Krylov, Stepan Oleinik, Samuil Marshak, Rasul Gamzatov, Sebastian Brant, Gianni Rodari, and François Villon.

== Awards ==
- Laureat al Premiului Național (2000)
- Honorary citizen of Căușeni District

== Works ==
- Parodii, Trandafir sălbatic (1965)
- Stele verzi (1967)
- Săgeți (1972)
- Săgeți
- Săgeți. Carul cu proști și alte poeme
- Vatra (1980)
- Parodii și epigrame (1981)
- Versuri lirice și satirice, Rezonanțe (1985)
- Penița și bărdița (1988)
- Fulgere basarabene
- Eu nu mă las de limba noastră, de limba noastră cea română (1997)
- Leul n-are frigider
- Pălăria gândurilor mele (2000)
- Puncte de reper (2003)

=== Children's books ===
- Cale bună, Ionele (1962)
- Poiana veselă (1963)
- Ploaie cu soare (1964)
- Zodia musafirului (1970)
- Ionică Tropoțel (1978)
- Între patru ochi (1979)
- Urzicuțe (1979)
- Vacanța lui Tropoțel (1980)
- Broasca cea isteață
- Luminișuri (1983)
- Tropoțel ajunge primul (1985)
- Zurgălăi, Tropoțel și toți ceilalți (1987)
- Zâmbăreți și cucuieți (1990)
- În ajun de Anul Nou (1992)
- Umbreluța (1994)
- Un motan citea o carte (2002)
