= Plop =

Plop may refer to:

- Kabouter Plop, the eponymous hero of the Belgian children's TV and comic strip series
- Plop, the Hungarian name for Plopi village, Valea Ierii Commune, Cluj County, Romania
- Plop, a slang word for feces
- Plop, a village in Coşcalia Commune, Căuşeni district, Moldova
- Plop, a village in Ghelari Commune, Hunedoara County, Romania
- Plop (owl), the main character in The Owl Who was Afraid of the Dark by Jill Tomlinson
- Plop, Donduşeni, a commune in Donduşeni district, Moldova
- Plop: The Hairless Elbonian, a Dilbert-spinoff comic strip by Scott Adams
- Plop!, a self-described "New Magazine of Weird Humor!" comic book published by DC Comics that ran from Sep/Oct 1973 to Nov/Dec 1976
- Plop-Ştiubei, a commune in Căuşeni district, Moldova
- A type of glissando in music
- Elder Plops, a character first appeared in the episode "Love Games" of the animated series Adventure Time

PLoP refers to:

- Pattern Languages of Programs, an annual computer science conference
- PloP boot manager (see Comparison of boot loaders), makes it possible to boot from CD-ROM or USB without bios support

PLOP refers to:

- PLate OPtimizer, the CAD program for optimization of telescope mirror support cells to reduce cell induced errors.
