= Plopu (disambiguation) =

Plopu may refer to several places in Romania:

- Plopu, a commune in Prahova County
- Plopu, a village administered by Dărmănești town, Bacău County
- Plopu, a village in Podu Turcului Commune, Bacău County
- Plopu, a village administered by Ianca town, Brăila County
- Plopu, a village in Armeniș Commune, Caraș-Severin County
- Plopu, a village administered by Titu town, Dâmbovița County
- Plopu, a village in Hurezani Commune, Gorj County
- Plopu, a village in Gura Caliței Commune, Vrancea County
- Plopu-Amărăşti, a village in Fărcaș Commune, Dolj County

== See also ==
- Plop (disambiguation)
- Plopi (disambiguation)
- Plopiș (disambiguation)
