= Săiți =

- Village
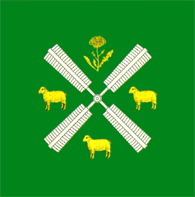
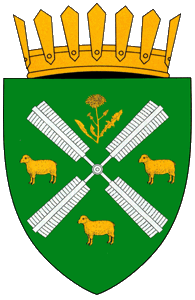
- Flag Seal

- Location in Moldova
- Coordinates: 46°30′N 29°24′E
- Country: Moldova
- District: Căușeni District
- Elevation: 308 ft (94 m)

Population (2014 census)
  - Total: 1,935
- Time zone: UTC+2 (EET)
  - Summer (DST): UTC+3 (EEST)
- Postal code: MD-4322
- Area code: +373 243

Săiți is a village in Căușeni District, Moldova.

== Notable people ==
- Sergiu Musteață
