= Tănătarii Noi =

- Commune
- Location within Moldova
- Coordinates: 46.7066666667°N 29.3708333333°E
- Country: Moldova
- District: Căușeni District

Government
  - Mayor: Nicolae Catanoi (PCRM)
- Elevation: 44 m (144 ft)

Population (2014)
  - Total: 636
- Time zone: UTC+2 (EET)
  - Summer (DST): UTC+3 (EEST)

Tănătarii Noi is a commune in Căușeni District, Moldova. It is composed of three villages: Ștefănești, Tănătarii Noi and Ursoaia Nouă.
