= Căușeni District =

Coordinates: 46°40′N 29°15′E

Căușeni District Raionul Căușeni
- District (Raion)
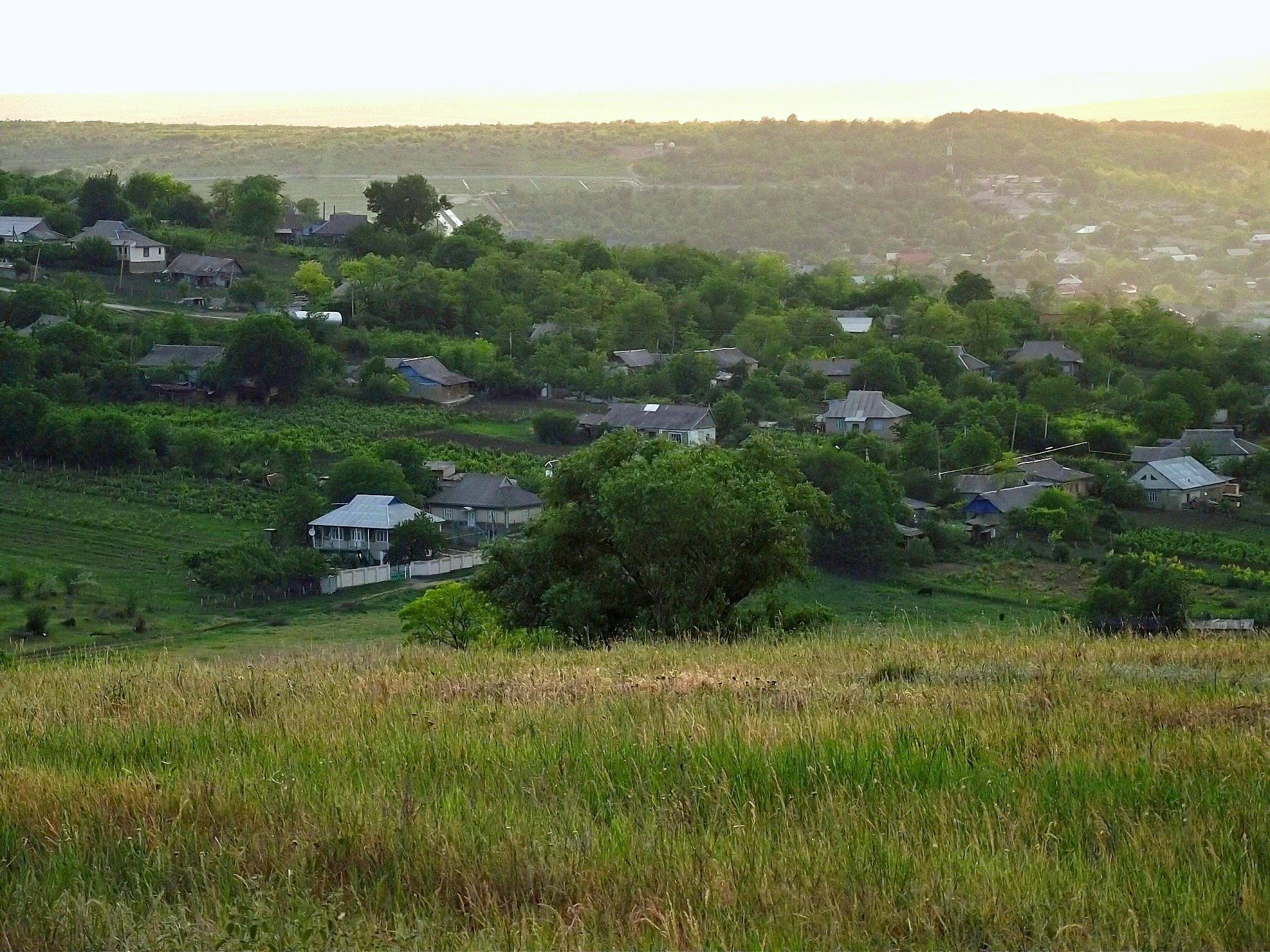

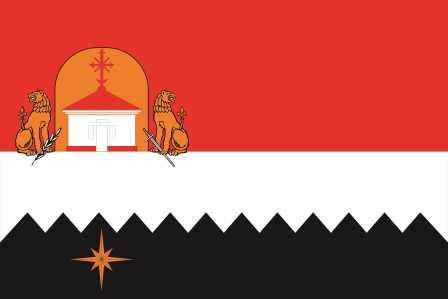
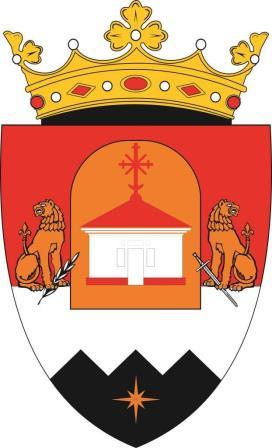
- Flag Coat of arms

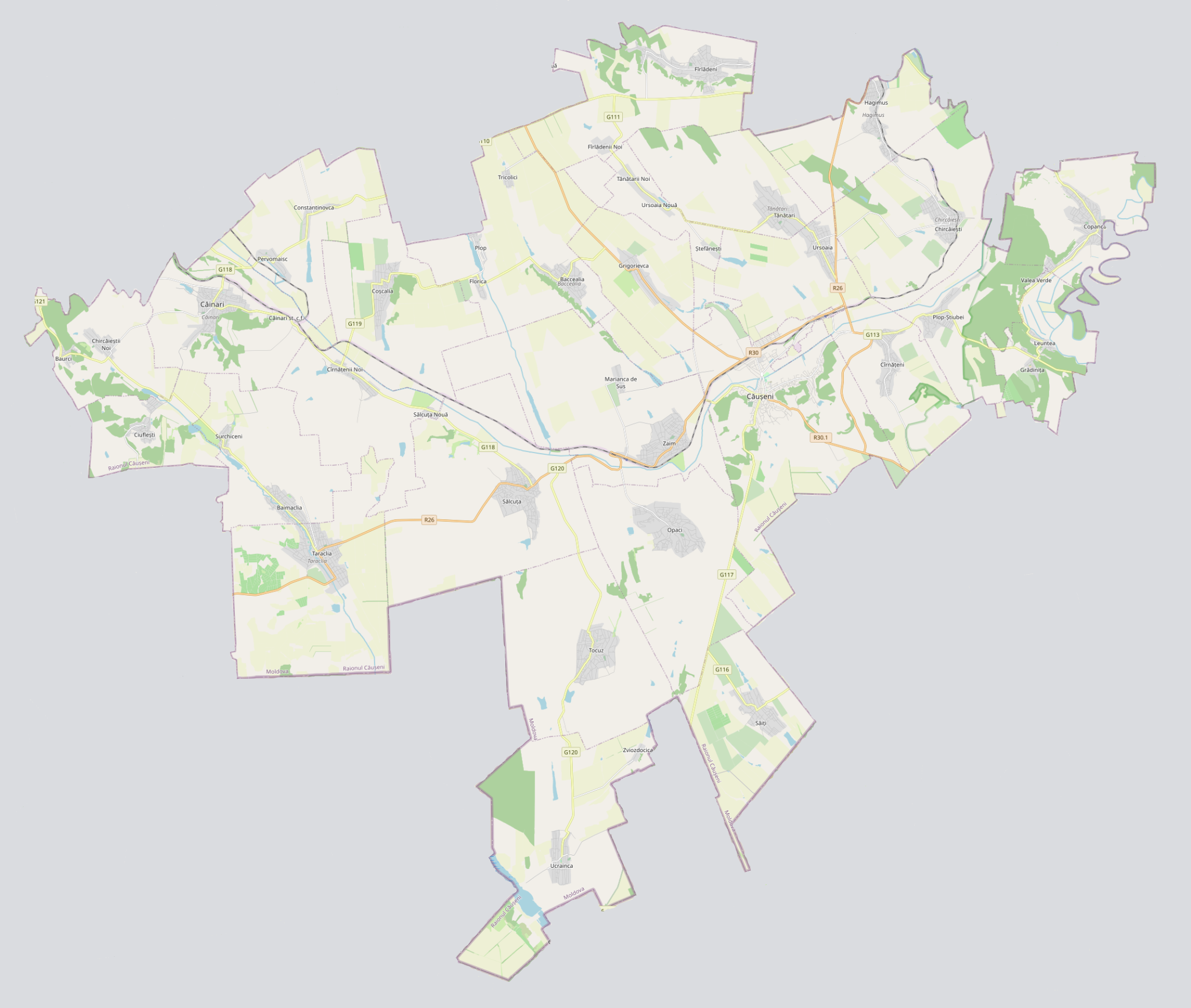
- Country: Republic of Moldova
- Administrative center (Oraș-reședință): Căușeni
- Established: 2002

Government
  - Raion president: Alexandru Catan (PAS, 2023)

Area
  - Total: 1,185.2 km^{2} (457.6 sq mi)

Population (2024)
  - Total: 57,261
  - Density: 48.313/km^{2} (125.13/sq mi)
- Time zone: UTC+2 (EET)
  - Summer (DST): UTC+3 (EEST)
- Area code: +373 43
- Car plates: CS
- Website: www.causeni.md

Căușeni District (Romanian: Raionul Căușeni, pronunciation: [kə.uˈʃenʲ]) is a district in the central part of Moldova, with the administrative center at Căușeni. The other major city in the district is Căinari. According to the 2024 Moldovan census, the population of the district is 57,261.

== History ==
The Căușeni District was the first district of Moldova to be recorded in 1455. The next localities of the region to be recorded were: Zaim, Cîrnățeni, Fîrlădeni, but not until the period 1535–1573. In the 16th-18th centuries, intensive agriculture and wine-making industries developed and population grew as a consequence. In 1761, in Căuşeni city, the Assumption Church was built with beautiful painted frescoes on the inside walls. In 1812, after the Russo-Turkish War (1806–1812), Bessarabia was occupied by the Russian Empire until 1917. During this period there was an intense Russification of the native population. In 1918, after the collapse of the Russian Empire, Bessarabia united with Romania. From 1918–1940 and again from 1941–1944 during the German occupation, the district became part of Tighina County. After the 1939 Molotov–Ribbentrop Pact, Bessarabia was occupied by the USSR in June 1940. In 1991 as a result of the proclamation of the Independence of Moldova, part of Căușeni District joined with Tighina County (1991–2003). In 2003 the district became an administrative unit of Moldova.

== Geography ==
Căușeni District is located in the southern part of Moldova. It is bordered by the following districts: Ialoveni and Anenii Noi in the north, Slobozia District in the east, Ștefan Vodă District in the south-east, bordering in the south with Ukraine, and Cimișlia District in the west. The relief of the land is mostly flat, with maximum altitudes of 220–230 metres. The minimum altitude is 20–30 metres on the Lower Dniester plain. The land has a low intensity of erosion.

=== Climate ===
The district has a continental climate with an annual average district temperature of 11 °C (52 °F). The July average temperature is 23 °C (73 °F), and in January it is −4 °C (25 °F). Annual precipitation 450–550 mm. Average wind speed is 2–5 metres/second.

=== Fauna ===
Typical European fauna, with the presence of such mammals such as foxes, hedgehogs, deer, wild boar, polecat, wild cat, ermine. and others. Of birds there are: partridges, crows, eagles, starlings, swallows, and more.

=== Flora ===
Forests of the district are composed of tree species such as oak, ash, hornbeam, linden, maple, walnut and others. Other common plants are: wormwood, knotweed, fescue, and nettle.

=== Rivers ===
Căușeni district is located in the Dniester River basin, whose main tributary is the Botna River (152 km). Most lakes are artificial in origin.

== Administrative subdivisions ==
- Administrative center: Căușeni
- Localities: 48 (2 Cities and 46 Villages in 28 Communes)
  - Cities: 2 (Căinari, Căușeni)
  - Communes: 28
  - Villages: 18

=== Communes in Căușeni district ===
1. Baccealia
2. Baimaclia
3. Chircăiești
4. Chircăieștii Noi
5. Cîrnățeni
6. Cîrnățenii Noi
7. Ciuflești
8. Coșcalia
9. Fîrlădeni
10. Grădinița
11. Grigorievca
12. Hagimus
13. Opaci
14. Pervomaisc
15. Plop-Știubei
16. Săiți
17. Sălcuța
18. Tănătari
19. Tănătarii Noi
20. Taraclia
21. Tocuz
22. Ucrainca
23. Ursoaia
24. Zaim
25. Copanca (claimed by Transnistria)
26. Chițcani (controlled by Transnistria)
27. Cremenciug (controlled by Transnistria)
28. Gîsca (controlled by Transnistria)

== Demographics ==
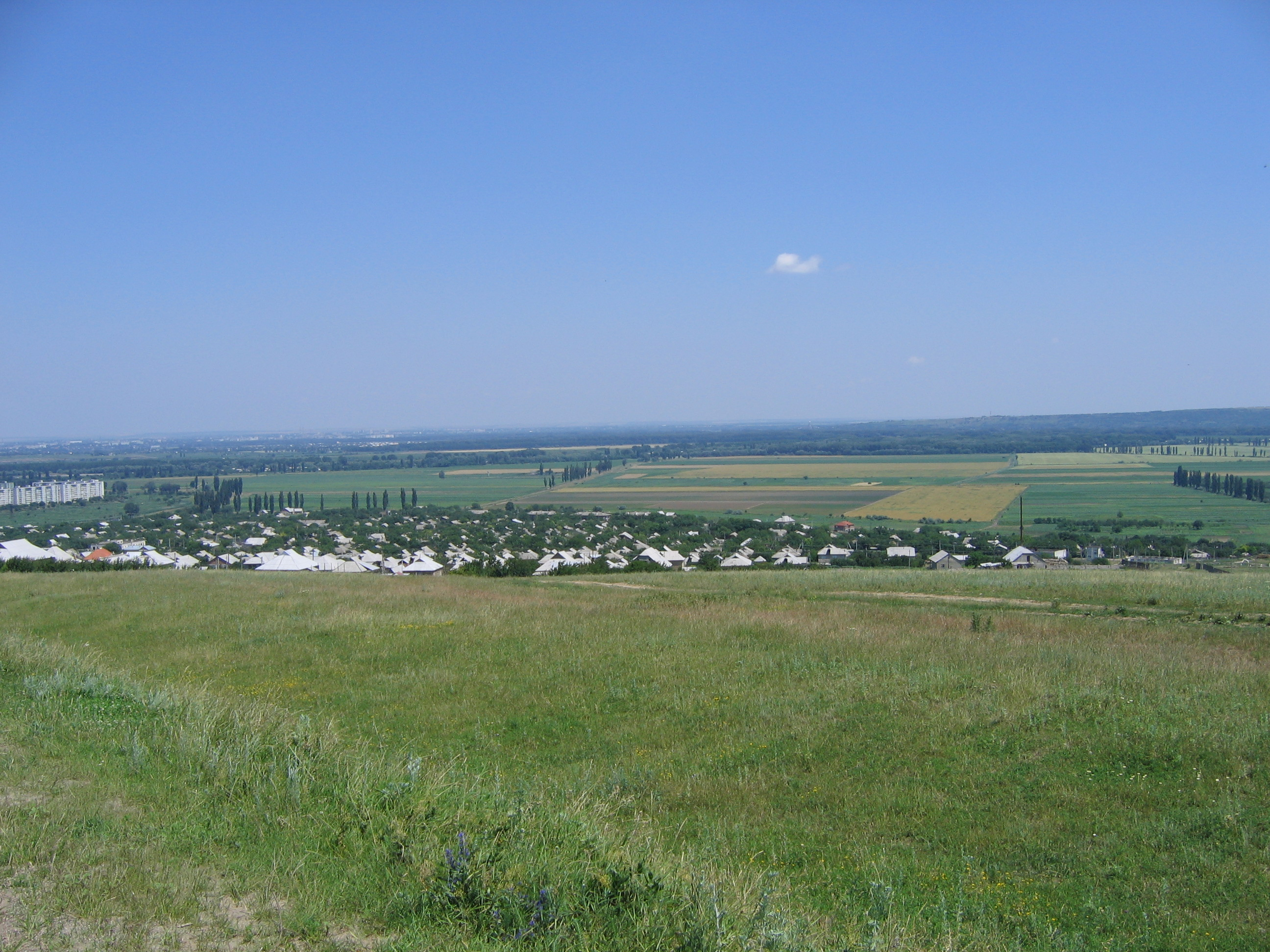
Hagimus (population: 2731)

As of the 2024 Census, the district population was 57,261, of which 27.0% was urban and 73.0% was rural population

=== Ethnic groups ===
Ethnic group	% of total
Moldovans *	85.8
Romanians *	8.4
Russians	2.3
Ukrainians	1.7
Bulgarians	0.9
Gagauz	0.6
Romani	0.1
Other	0.2
Undeclared	0.1

Footnote: * There is an ongoing controversy regarding the ethnic identification of Moldovans and Romanians.

=== Religion ===
- Christians - 99.1%
  - Orthodox Christians - 96.9%
  - Protestant - 2.1%
- Other 0.5%
- No religion 0.4%

== Economy ==
The main economic activities of the district are agriculture and manufacturing. Currently there are 15,721 registered companies in the district. The different types of manufacturing that predominate are: wine-making, processing of milk, bakery products, and other industries based on local raw materials. Total Agricultural land is 93,700 ha which is (80.5%) of the total land area. Of this agricultural land, the arable land occupies 70 600 ha (60.7%), of which there are 4,300 ha of orchards (3.7%) and 5,200 ha of vineyards (4.5%).

== Education ==
The district operates 69 educational institutions, including institutions of secondary education - 37 (14,960 students), kindergartens - 31 (3014 children), a creative center for children.

== Politics ==
Căușeni District has historically voted mainly for right-wing parties. In Moldova the district is represented by the Alliance for European Integration (AEI). The Party of Communists of the Republic of Moldova (PCRM) has seen a continuous fall in the percentage of the vote during the last three elections.

During the last three elections the vote for the AEI has grown from 11,179 votes to 20,140 votes representing an increase of 80%.

Parliament elections results
Year	AEI	PCRM
2010	51.58% 20,140	41.19% 16,082
July 2009	50.27% 19,629	44.26% 17,281
April 2009	30.03% 11,179	53.01% 19,733

=== Elections ===
Summary of 28 November 2010 Parliament of Moldova election results in Causeni District
Parties and coalitions	Votes	%	+/−
Party of Communists of the Republic of Moldova	16,082	41.19	−3.07
Liberal Democratic Party of Moldova	12,525	32.08	+19.62
Democratic Party of Moldova	4,725	12,10	+3.13
Liberal Party	2,515	6.44	−5.68
European Action Movement	835	2.14	+2.14
United Moldova	437	1.12	+1.12
Other Party	1,538	3.91	-18.34
Total (turnout 57.46%)	39,352	100.00	

== Culture ==
In the Căușeni District there are: 37 houses of culture, several folk bands with a Title 31 model, and 74 amateur artistic groups with a total of 1200 participants. There is a School of Arts in Căușeni city, a school of Music in both Căinari and Copanca, a museum of history and ethnography of Căușeni, the "Alexei Mateevici House Museum" in Zaim, and in Cainari, a Museum of history and ethnography in Copanca, and 45 public Libraries including 9 branches for children].

== Health ==
Health services are provided in Căușeni District through: a general fund hospital with 292 beds, 19 Magnetic field imaging (MFI) units, 13 health centres, 5 health points, and 13 clinical diagnostic laboratories.

== Tourism ==
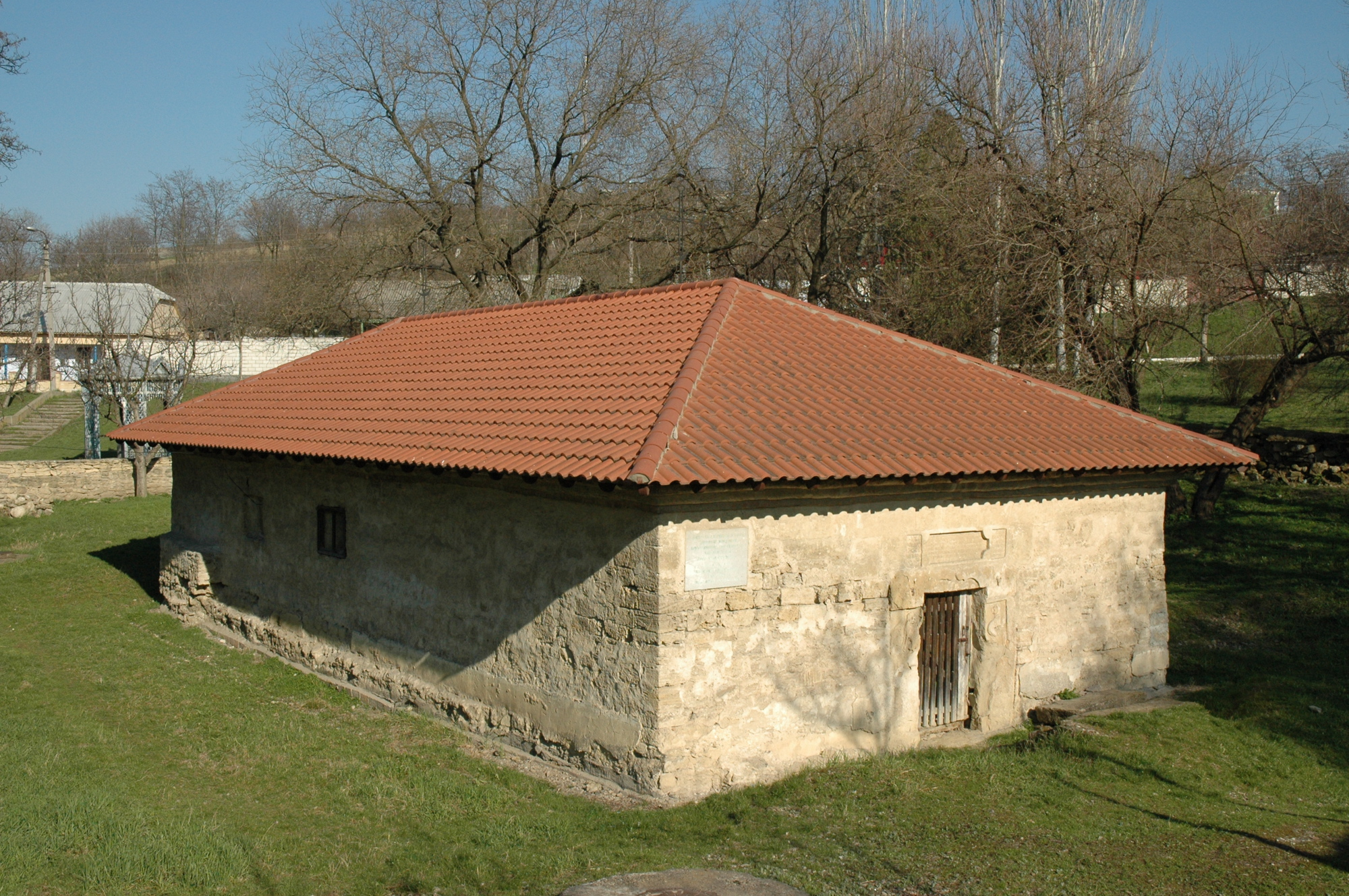
Assumption of Our Lady Church

- Assumption of Our Lady Church, Căușeni
- Trajan's Wall in villages Copanca and Chircăiești
