= Hagimus =

- Village
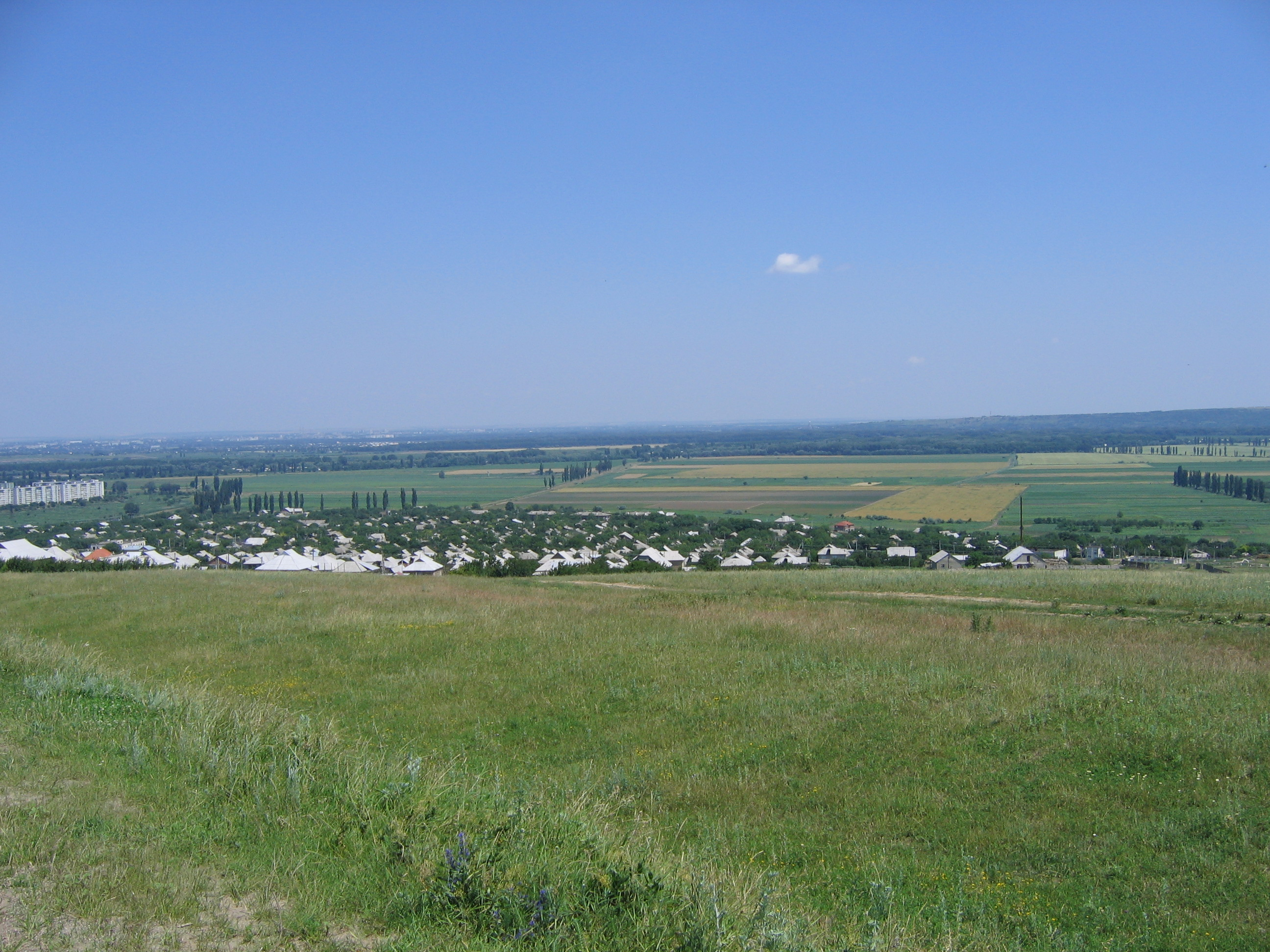

- Location within Moldova
- Coordinates: 46.7563888889°N 29.4797222222°E
- Country: Moldova
- District: Căușeni District

Government
  - Mayor: Anatolia Iepure (PLDM)
- Elevation: 56 m (184 ft)

Population (2014 census)
  - Total: 2,926
- Time zone: UTC+2 (EET)
  - Summer (DST): UTC+3 (EEST)
- Postal code: MD-4319

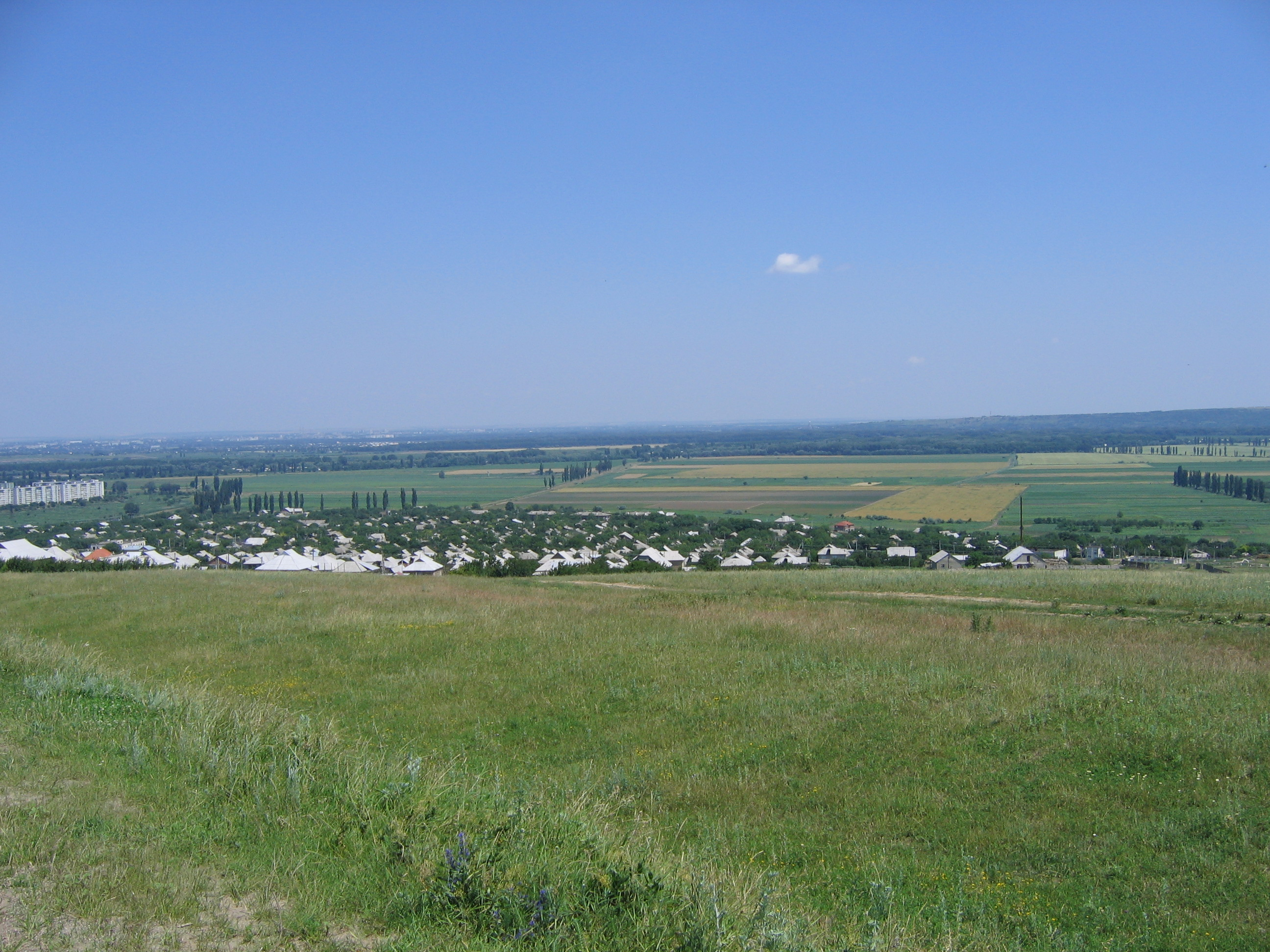
A picture of Hagimus

Hagimus is a village in Căușeni District, Moldova.
