= Sergiu Musteață =

Moldovan historian

Member of the Commission for the Study of the Communist Dictatorship in Moldova
- Incumbent
- Assumed office January 14, 2010

Personal details
- Born: May 11, 1972 (age 54) Săiți
- Education: "Ion Creangă" State Pedagogical University (1989–1994) Moldova State University (1994–1999) Alexandru Ioan Cuza University, Iași, Romania (1994–1998)
- Profession: Historian

Sergiu Musteață (born 11 May 1972) is a historian from the Republic of Moldova and Dean of History and Geography Faculty, "Ion Creangă" State Pedagogical University.

== Biography ==
Sergiu Musteață is a historian from the Republic of Moldova, Professor and Dean of the History and Geography Faculty, of the "Ion Creangă" State Pedagogical University of Moldova, founder and president of the National Association of Young Historians of Moldova. He holds a Ph.D. from the History Faculty of Alexandru Ioan Cuza University, Iași, Romania.

Musteață is a former Fulbright research fellow at University of Maryland, USA (2007), OSI scholar at the ISEEES, University of California, Berkeley, USA (2012) and CREEES, Stanford University, California, USA (2013). He is the author of 6 monographs, more than 200 scientific publications, editor of 15 books, and editor of the young historian's annual journal. His major academic interests are History of South-Eastern Europe, Cultural Heritage Preservation, and History Textbooks Analysis.

== Works ==
1. S. Musteață, Ș. Căliniuc (eds), Current Trends in Archaeological Heritage Preservation: National and International Perspectives. Proceedings of the international conference, Iași, Romania, November 6–10, 2013, Oxford, BAR International Series 2741, 2015, 128 p. ISBN 9781407314006
2. S. Musteață (ed.), Cetatea Soroca – istorie, memorie și tradiții seculare. Materialele conferinței, Soroca, 4-5 aprilie 2013, Seria "Istorii și Documente Necunoscute – IDN", C5, Chișinău, Editura ARC, 2015, ISBN 978-9975-61-926-4
3. S. Musteață, A. Corduneanu, (Eds.), Identitățile Chişinăului. Ediția a doua. Materialele conferinţelor internaționale: Identitățile Chișinăului, 1-2 octombrie 2013, Chișinău; Patrimoniul cultural al Chișinăului vs. Dezvoltarea urbanistică, 25 iunie 2014 [Chișinău's Identities. Second edition. Conferences proceedings, October 1–2, 2013, June 25, 2014], Culegere de studii, Seria IDN, C4, Chișinău, Editura ARC, 2015. ISBN 978-9975-61-872-4
4. S. Musteață, Moneda bizantină în regiunile carpato-nistrene în secolele V-X, Chișinău, Editura ARC, 2014, 300 p., ISBN 978-9975-61-764-2.
5. S. Musteață, (Ed.), Arheologia și politicile de protejare a patrimoniului cultural în România. Culegere de studii, Chișinău/Iași, Editura ARC, 2014, ISBN 978-9975-61-843-4
6. S. Musteață, (Ed.), Two Decades of Development in Post-Soviet States: Successes and Failures, Colecția Academica, 232, Iași, Institutul European, 2014, ISBN 978-606-24-0073-6
7. S. Musteață, (Ed.), Tratatul de Pace de la București din 1812. 200 de ani de la anexarea Basarabiei de către Imperiul Rus. Materialele conferinței internaţionale, Chișinău, 26-28 aprilie 2012, [The Bucharest Peace Treatment of 1812. 200 years of annexation Bessarabia by Russian Empire. Proceedings of the International Conference, Chişinău, April 26–28, 2012], Culegere de studii, Seria IDN, C3, Chișinău, Editura Pontos, 2012.
8. S. Musteață, A. Corduneanu, (Eds.), Identităţile Chișinăului. Materialele conferinţei, 12-13 septembrie 2011 [Chișinau's Identities. Conference proceedings, September 12–13, 2011], Culegere de studii, Seria IDN, C2, Chișinău, Editura Pontos, 2012.
9. S. Musteață, I. Caşu, (Eds.), Fără termen de prescripție. Aspecte ale investigării crimelor comunismului în Europa [Without limitation period. Some aspects of investigation Communism crimes in Europe], Chișinău, Editura Cartier, Colecţia Cartier istoric, 2011.
10. S. Musteață, Educația istorică între discursul politic şi identitar în Republica Moldova [History education between political and identity discourse in the Republic of Moldova], Seria IDN, M3, Chișinău, Editura Pontos, 2010, 364 p.
11. S. Musteață, (Ed.), Protecția juridică a patrimoniului arheologic. Culegere de acte normative și convenții internaționale [Juridical preservation of the archaeological heritage. Collection of the national laws and international conventions], Chișinău, Editura Ruxanda, 2010.
12. S. Musteață, (Ed.), Predarea istoriei. Îndrumar metodic pentru profesori [History teaching. Methodological guide for teachers], Chișinău, Editura Pontos, 2010, 408 p.
13. S. Musteață, Protecția patrimoniului arheologic. Studiu comparativ: legislaţia Republicii Moldova şi Statelor Unite ale Americii, [Preservation of the archaeological heritage. Comparative study: the legal framework in the Republic of Moldova and the United States of America]. Monografii ANTIM IV, Chişinău: Pontos, 2008.
14. S. Musteață, Как составляются и анализируются школьные учебники [How to write and analyse textbooks], Chișinău: Pontos, 2008.
15. S. Musteață, Cum să elaborăm și analizăm manualele şcolare [How to write and analyse textbooks], Chișinău: Editura Cartdidact, 2006.
16. S. Musteață, (ed.) Educația toleranței și cetățeniei democratice prin intermediul istoriei. Pachet educaţional [Education of tolerance and democratic citizenship through history. Educational pack], Chișinău: Cartdidact, 2006.
17. S. Musteață, Populaţia spațiului pruto-nistrean în secolele VIII-IX [Population of the Prut-Nistru region during 8th – 9th c.]. Monografii ANTIM I, Chișinău: Pontos, 2005.
18. S. Musteață, (ed.), Republica Moldova și România: un deceniu de relaţii complexe [Republic of Moldova and Romania: a decade of complex relations], Chișinău, 2002.
19. S. Musteaţă, (ed.), Protecţia Patrimoniului, Culegere de Legi și Convenții [Heritage Preservation. Colleaction of Laws and Conventions], Chișinău, 2001.
20. S. Musteață, (ed.), Religion, Society, and Education in Post–Totalitarian Societies of Central and South Eastern Europe, (papers of round table discussions, Chişinău, October 26–28, 2000), Chișinău: Arc, 2001.
21. S. Musteață, (ed.), Unitatea Nationala a Romanilor intre ideal si realitate. Materialele Dezbaterilor Nationale [National Unity of the Romanians between ideal and reality. National Debates Papers], Chișinău, 2001.
22. S. Musteață, (ed.), Demistificarea sau Remistificarea Istoriei, Materialele Dezbaterilor Naționale [Demistification or Remistification of History], 26-28 aprilie 1999, Chişinău, 2000.
23. T. Arnăut, O. Munteanu, S. Musteață, (Eds.) Studii de Istorie Veche și Medievală. Omagiu profesorului Gheorghe Postică [Studies on Old and Medieval History], Chișinău, 2004.
