= Căinari =

- Town
- Location of Căinari in Moldova
- Country: Moldova
- District: Căușeni
- Elevation: 51 m (167 ft)

Population (2014)
  - Total: 3,803
- Climate: Cfb
- Website: primariacainari.md

Căinari is a town in Căușeni District, Moldova. One village is administered by the town, Căinari station.

The town is located 37 km (23 mi) west of the district seat, Căușeni, and 49 km (30 mi) south of Chișinău.

== International relations ==
=== Twin towns — Sister cities ===
Căinari is twinned with:

- Murfatlar, Romania
