= Grigorievca =

- Village
- Location within Moldova
- Coordinates: 46.6897222222°N 29.3294444444°E
- Country: Moldova
- District: Căușeni District

Government
  - Mayor: Tatiana Ivanova (PSRM)

Population (2014 census)
  - Total: 1,096
- Time zone: UTC+2 (EET)
  - Summer (DST): UTC+3 (EEST)

Grigorievca is a village in Căușeni District, Moldova. It is located 106 meters above sea level.
