= Cîrnățenii Noi =

- Commune
- Location within Moldova
- Coordinates: 46.6494444444°N 29.135°E
- Country: Moldova
- District: Căușeni District

Government
  - Mayor: Parascovia Antoniuc (AMN)

Population (2014)
  - Total: 1,444
- Time zone: UTC+2 (EET)
  - Summer (DST): UTC+3 (EEST)

Cîrnățenii Noi is a commune in Căușeni District, Moldova. It is between Căinari and Sălcuța Nouă.
