= Ciuflești =

- Village
- Location within Moldova
- Coordinates: 46.6241666667°N 29.0019444444°E
- Country: Moldova
- District: Căușeni District

Government
  - Mayor: Sergiu Pîrlog (PLDM)

Population (2014 census)
  - Total: 984
- Time zone: UTC+2 (EET)
  - Summer (DST): UTC+3 (EEST)

Ciuflești is a village in Căușeni District, Moldova.
