= Plopiș (disambiguation) =

Plopiș is a commune in Sălaj County, Romania.

Plopiș may refer to several other places in Romania:

- Plopiș, a village in Harghita County
- Plopiș, a village in Maramureș County

== See also ==
- Plopi (disambiguation)
- Plopu (disambiguation)
