= Pervomaisc, Căușeni =

Pervomaisc
- Commune
- Location within Moldova
- Coordinates: 46.7011111111°N 29.0891666667°E
- Country: Moldova
- District: Căușeni District

Government
  - Mayor: Ivan Derli (PCRM)

Population (2014)
  - Total: 1,306
- Time zone: UTC+2 (EET)
  - Summer (DST): UTC+3 (EEST)

Pervomaisc is a community in Căușeni District, Moldova. It is composed of two villages, Constantinovca and Pervomaisc.
