= Copanca =

- Village
- Location within Moldova
- Coordinates: 46°42′55″N 29°37′37″E
- Country: Moldova

Government
  - Mayor: Afanasii Cuțari (PCRM)
- Elevation: 53 m (174 ft)

Population (2014 census)
  - Total: 4,681
- Time zone: UTC+2 (EET)
  - Summer (DST): UTC+3 (EEST)
- Postal code: MD-5716

Copanca is a village in Căușeni District, Moldova.

== Media ==
- Jurnal FM - 103.6 MHz
