= Ucrainca =

- Commune
- Interactive map of Ucrainca
- Location within Moldova
- Coordinates: 46°25′52″N 29°16′22″E
- Country: Moldova
- District: Căușeni District

Government
  - Mayor: Vladimir Iurco
- Elevation: 61 m (200 ft)

Population (2014)
  - Total: 1,559
- Time zone: UTC+2 (EET)
  - Summer (DST): UTC+3 (EEST)

Ucrainca is a commune in Căușeni District, Moldova. It is composed of two villages, Ucrainca and Zviozdocica.
