= Tocuz =

- Village
- Interactive map of Tocuz
- Location within Moldova
- Coordinates: 46.5238888889°N 29.2961111111°E
- Country: Moldova
- District: Căușeni

Government
  - Mayor: Alexandru Țurcan (PDM)
- Elevation: 116 m (381 ft)

Population (2014 census)
  - Total: 3,720
- Time zone: UTC+2 (EET)
  - Summer (DST): UTC+3 (EEST)

Tocuz is a village in Căușeni District, Moldova.
