= Chircăieștii Noi =

- Commune
- Location within Moldova
- Coordinates: 46.6633333333°N 28.9725°E
- Country: Moldova
- District: Căușeni District

Government
  - Mayor: Vitalie Cericov (AMN)

Population (2014)
  - Total: 1,556
- Time zone: UTC+2 (EET)
  - Summer (DST): UTC+3 (EEST)

Chircăieștii Noi is a commune in Căușeni District, Moldova. It is composed of two villages, Baurci and Chircăieștii Noi.
