= Chircăiești =

- Village
- Location within Moldova
- Coordinates: 46°43′00″N 29°31′00″E
- Country: Moldova
- District: Căușeni District

Government
  - Mayor: Burlac Oleg (PAS)

Population (2014 census)
  - Total: 3,016
- Time zone: UTC+2 (EET)
  - Summer (DST): UTC+3 (EEST)
- Website: http://chircaiesti.md

Chircăiești is a village in Căușeni District, Moldova.
