= Assumption of Our Lady Church, Căușeni =

Coordinates: 46.6398°N 29.4108°E

Assumption of Our Lady Church
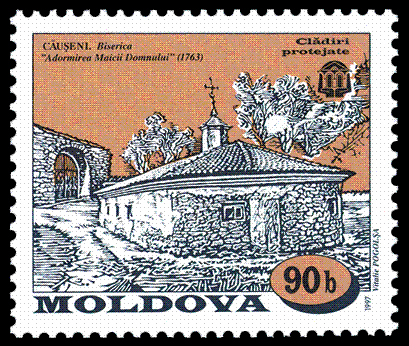
- 1997 Stamp
- Assumption of Our Lady Church
- Location: Căuşeni
- Country: Moldova
- Denomination: Eastern Orthodoxy

History
- Status: Church
- Dedication: Mother of Christ

The Church of Assumption of Our Lady, Căuşeni (Romanian: Biserica "Adormirea Maicii Domnului" din Căuşeni) is a historical monument in Căuşeni, Moldova. The church was painted in 1763 by Radu and Voicu Stanciul.

== History ==
The specific date of the construction of the church is not known but it is believed to have been originally constructed in the 15th century, where it is considered by historians as one of the best preserved examples of a medieval church in the southern Bessarabia region. A local legend asserts that the muslim Tatars, that had occupied Moldavia at the time, granted permission for the Orthodox Christians to build the church providing that it was not built taller than the height of a soldier on horseback carrying a spear. This was in order that it was not seen as a challenge to their mosques. In accordance with this request, the church was constructed sunken into the ground. In 1763, the interior of the church was decorated with detailed Christian frescos painted by Radu and Voicu Stanciul, according to an inscription in Greek within the church. In 1807, following the removal of the muslim administration, a tower with a cross on top was added to the church.

During the Soviet Union's rule in the Moldavian Soviet Socialist Republic, the church was transformed into a warehouse and later a smoking and fruit drying industrial building, which had the consequence of damaging the frescos. In 1983, it was given the status of a monument and handed over by the Soviet authorities to the National Museum of Fine Arts. In the 2020s, the Church was restored following intervention from the Moldovan Ministry of Culture. The Embassy of the United States, Chişinău contributed $1 million towards the restoration with funding from the Ambassadors Fund for Cultural Preservation. The church was reopened in 2024.

== Gallery ==
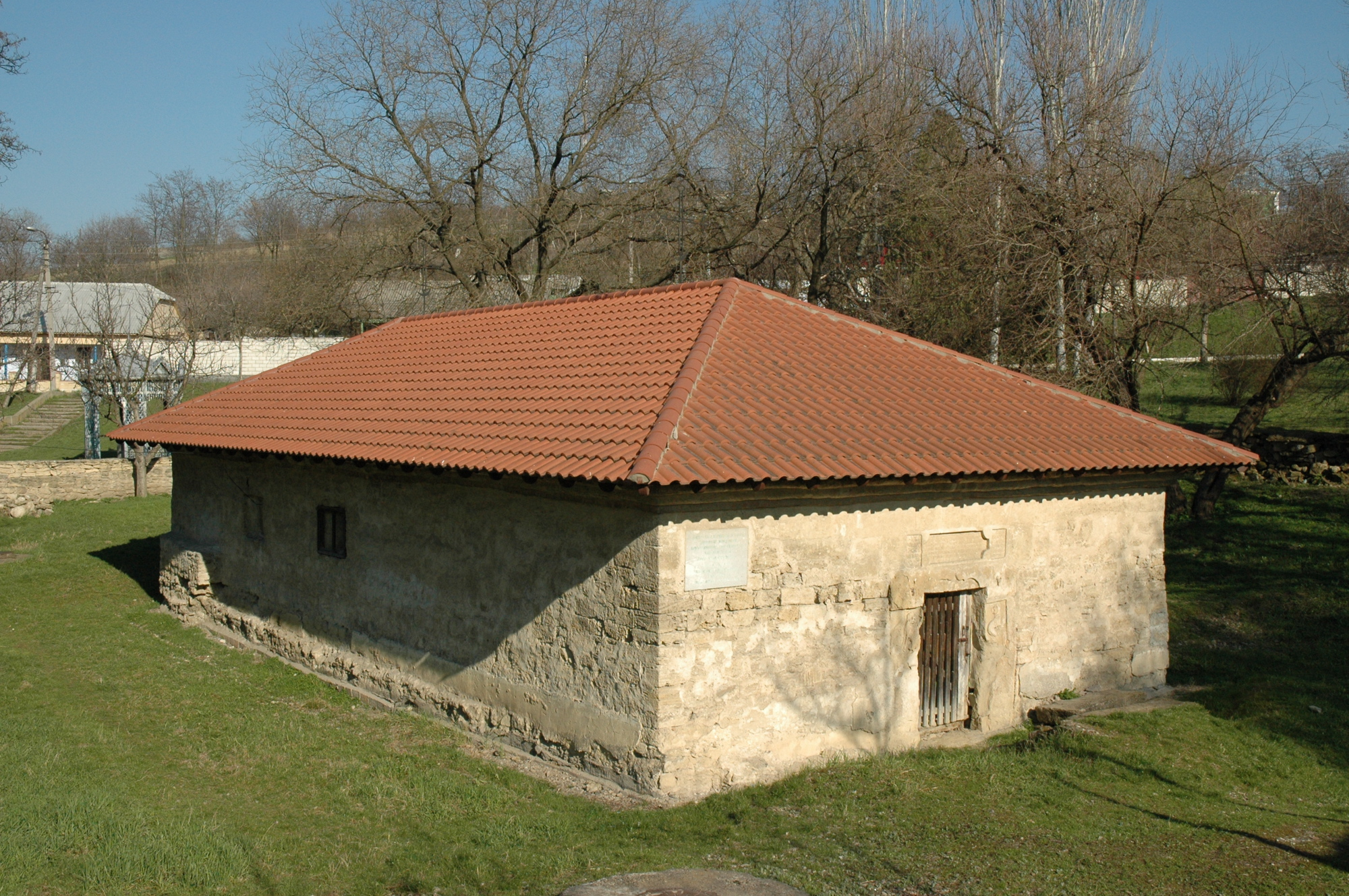

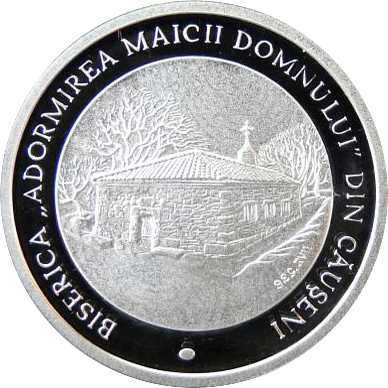

== Bibliography ==
- Constantin Ciobanu – Biserica Adormirea Maicii Domnului din Căuşeni, Editura Ştiinţa, Chişinău, 1997; ISBN 9975-67-051-2
- Pavel Balan, Icoana Sufletului Nostru, Ed. Hyperion, Chişinău, 1992.
