= Fîrlădeni, Hîncești =

Fîrlădeni
- Village
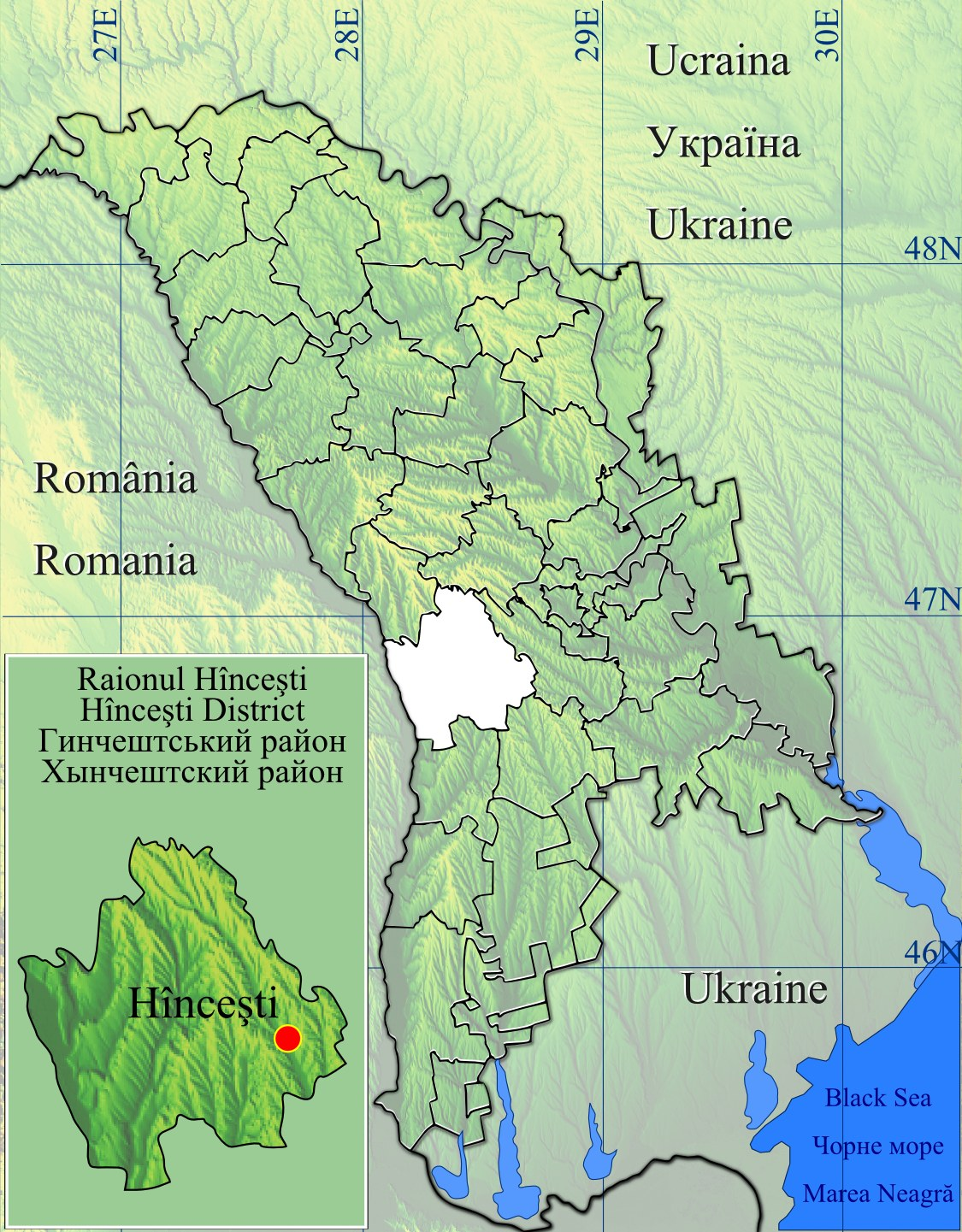
- Location within Hîncești
- Coordinates: 46°47′20″N 28°41′3″E
- Country: Moldova
- District: Hîncești District

Government
  - Mayor: Pavel Barbos (PDM)

Population (2014 census)
  - Total: 925
- Time zone: UTC+2 (EET)
  - Summer (DST): UTC+3 (EEST)
- Postal code: MD-3427

Fîrlădeni is a village in Hîncești District, Moldova.
