= Taraclia, Căușeni =

Taraclia
- Village
- Location within Moldova
- Coordinates: 46.5702777778°N 29.1155555556°E
- Country: Moldova
- District: Căușeni District

Government
  - Mayor: Vladimir Cucereavîi (PLDM)

Population (2014 census)
  - Total: 3,751
- Time zone: UTC+2 (EET)
  - Summer (DST): UTC+3 (EEST)

Taraclia is a village in Căușeni District, Moldova.
