= Fîrlădeni, Căușeni =

Fîrlădeni
- Commune
- Location within Moldova
- Coordinates: 46.7883333333°N 29.3669444444°E
- Country: Moldova
- District: Căușeni District

Government
  - Mayor: Gangan Ion (PCRM)

Population (2014)
  - Total: 4,406
- Time zone: UTC+2 (EET)
  - Summer (DST): UTC+3 (EEST)

Fîrlădeni is a commune in Căușeni District, Moldova. It is composed of two villages, Fîrlădeni and Fîrlădenii Noi.
