= Marianca de Jos =

Marianca de Jos Нижняя Марьяновка (Russian) Мар'янка-де-Жос (Ukrainian)
- Village
- Location within Moldova
- Coordinates: 46°31′12″N 29°36′15″E
- Country: Moldova

Government
  - Mayor: Ruslan Știrbu (PLDM)

Area
  - Total: 12.97 km^{2} (5.01 sq mi)
- Elevation: 86 m (282 ft)

Population (2014 census)
  - Total: 4,130
- Time zone: UTC+2 (EET)
  - Summer (DST): UTC+3 (EEST)
- Postal code: MD-4224

Marianca de Jos is a village in Ștefan Vodă District, Moldova.
