= Baimaclia, Căușeni =

Baimaclia
- Commune
- Location within Moldova
- Coordinates: 46°41′28″N 29°16′50″E
- Country: Moldova
- District: Căușeni

Government
  - Mayor: Adrian Cojocari (PL)

Population (2014)
  - Total: 2,207
- Time zone: UTC+2 (EET)
  - Summer (DST): UTC+3 (EEST)

Baimaclia is a commune in Căușeni District, Moldova. It is composed of two villages, Baimaclia and Surchiceni.
