= Ursoaia, Căușeni =

- Village
- Location within Moldova
- Coordinates: 46.7058333333°N 29.4455555556°E
- Country: Moldova
- District: Căușeni District

Government
  - Mayor: Elena Marjinean (PDM)

Population (2014 census)
  - Total: 2,465
- Time zone: UTC+2 (EET)
  - Summer (DST): UTC+3 (EEST)

Ursoaia is a village in Căușeni District, Moldova.
