= Cîrnățeni =

- Village
- Location within Moldova
- Coordinates: 46.6544444444°N 29.4919444444°E
- Country: Moldova
- District: Căușeni District

Government
  - Mayor: Oleg Savca (PLDM)

Area
  - Total: 31.6511 km^{2} (12.2206 sq mi)

Population (2014 census)
  - Total: 2,739
- Time zone: UTC+2 (EET)
  - Summer (DST): UTC+3 (EEST)
- Postal code: MD-4313

Cîrnățeni is a village in Căușeni District, Moldova.

The village has an area of about 31.6511 km^{2}, being at a distance of 5 km from Causeni city and 78 km from Chisinau.

The village of Cîrnăţeni was first officially mentioned in 1651.

According to legend, a merchant at the site was approached by travellers, who said people would stay and rest if food was available. The merchant responded by building a rest stop, and the town was named after the sausages served there.
