= Coșcalia =

- Village
- Location within Moldova
- Coordinates: 46.6855555556°N 29.1569444444°E
- Country: Moldova
- District: Căușeni
  - Mayor: (PLDM)

Population (2014)
  - Total: 1,952
- Time zone: UTC+2 (EET)
  - Summer (DST): UTC+3 (EEST)

Coșcalia is a village and former commune in Căușeni District, Moldova. Until 12 April 2011, along with villages Florica and Plop, it formed commune of Coșcalia.
