= Opaci =

- Village
- Location in Moldova
- Coordinates: 46°35′N 29°21′E
- Country: Moldova
- District: Căușeni District
- Elevation: 276 ft (84 m)

Population (2014 census)
  - Total: 3,114
- Time zone: UTC+2 (EET)
  - Summer (DST): UTC+3 (EEST)
- Postal code: MD-4320
- Area code: +373 243

Opaci is a village in Căușeni District, Moldova. The population in 2012 was 3,114. There were 1,560 men and 1,554 women.

== Notable people ==
- Ion Ungureanu
- Andrei Ivanțoc
