= Plop-Știubei =

- Village
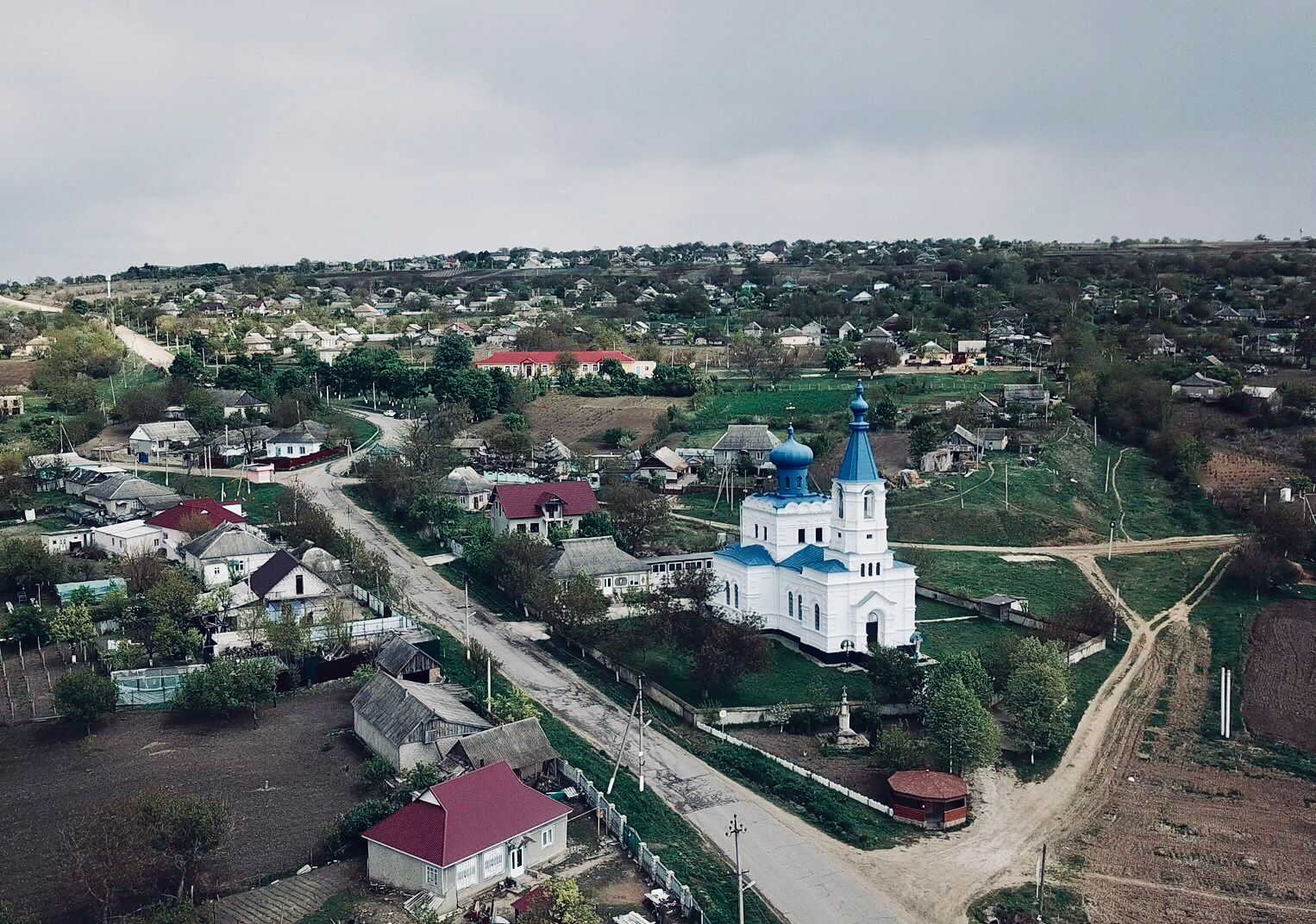

- Location within Moldova
- Coordinates: 46.675°N 29.5144444444°E
- Country: Moldova
- District: Căușeni District

Government
  - Mayor: Denis Iliev (Party of Action and Solidarity)

Population (2014 census)
  - Total: 1,685
- Time zone: UTC+2 (EET)
  - Summer (DST): UTC+3 (EEST)

Plop-Știubei is a village in Căușeni District, Moldova.
