= Grădinița =

- Commune
- Location within Moldova
- Coordinates: 46.6530555556°N 29.5841666667°E
- Country: Moldova
- District: Căușeni District

Government
  - Mayor: Сергей Иванов (PDM)

Population (2014)
  - Total: 1,053
- Time zone: UTC+2 (EET)
  - Summer (DST): UTC+3 (EEST)

Grădinița is a commune in Căușeni District, Moldova. It is composed of three villages: Grădinița, Leuntea and Valea Verde.
