= Zaim, Căușeni =

Zaim
- Commune
- Flag

- Location in Moldova
- Coordinates: 46°37′N 29°21′E
- Country: Moldova
- District: Căușeni District
- Elevation: 118 ft (36 m)

Population (2014)
  - Total: 4,281
- Time zone: UTC+2 (EET)
  - Summer (DST): UTC+3 (EEST)

Zaim commune in a Căușeni District, Moldova, located 7 km from the district seat Căușeni. It is composed of three villages: Marianca de Sus, Zaim and Zaim station.

== Demographics ==
As of the 2014 Moldovan Census, it had a population of 4,281, of whom 3,807 are Moldovans, 368 Romanians, 27 Russians, 12 Ukrainians, and 67 other/undeclared. The dominant language is Romanian.

== History ==
Zaim is well known in Moldova as the home village of Alexei Mateevici, a famous Bessarabian poet and national activist. Mateevici's house is currently a museum. In Zaim there is also a Museum of the Spirit of Southern Moldova, that includes exhibits of a number of artists and writers with origins in southern Bessarabia.

== Notable people ==
- Alexei Mateevici
- Vasile Cijevschi
- Petru Cărare
