= Botna =

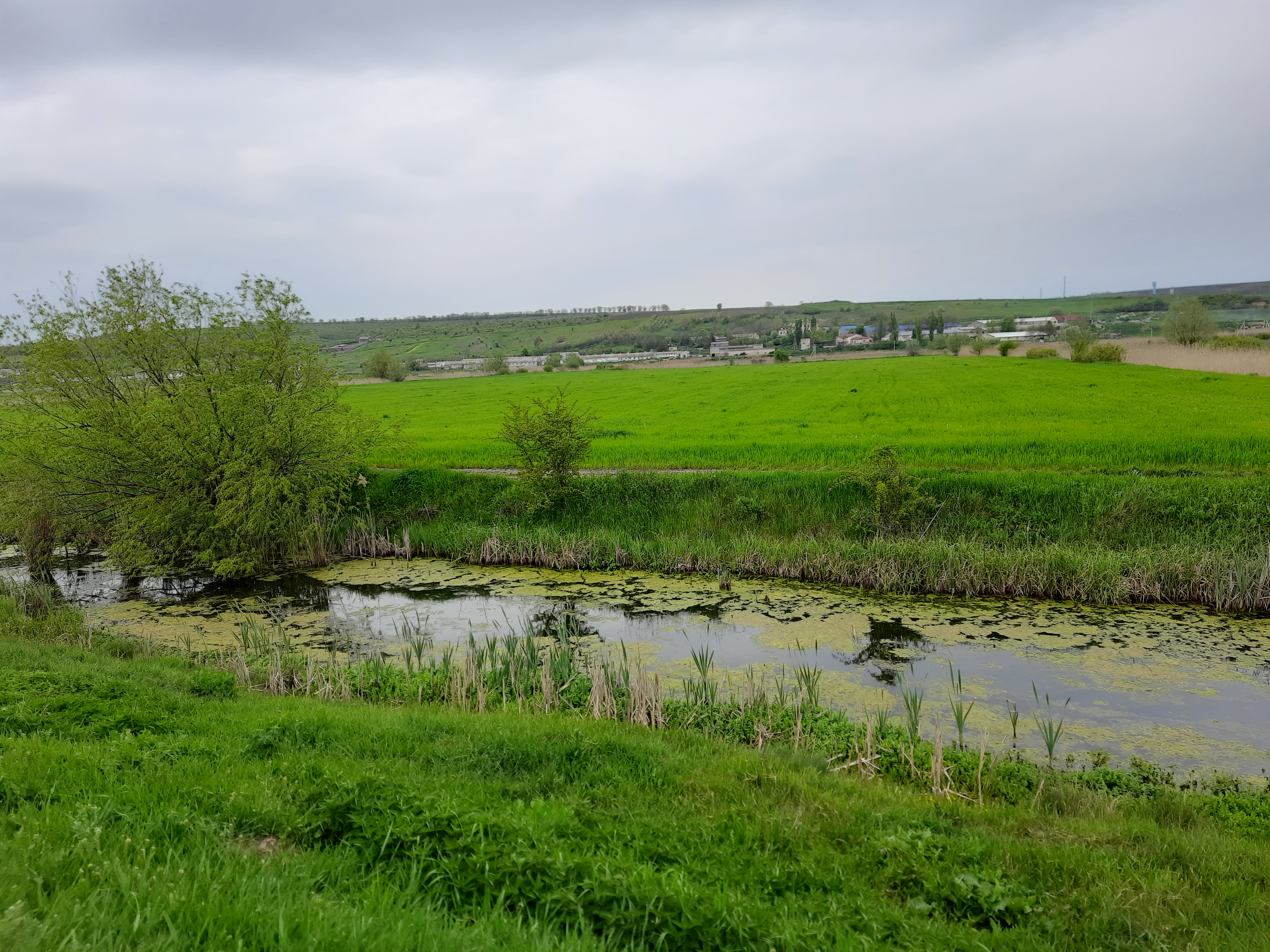

Location
- Country: Moldova

Physical characteristics
- Source
  - location: Codri
- Mouth
  - location: Dniester
  - coordinates: 46°46′37″N 29°33′38″E
- Length: 152 km (94 mi)
- Basin size: 1,540 km^{2} (590 sq mi)
- Discharge
  - average: 1.1 m^{3}/s (39 cu ft/s)

Basin features
- Progression: Dniester→ Dniester Estuary→ Black Sea

Botna is a river in Moldova, a right tributary of Dniester. With a length of 152 kilometres, Botna is the sixth longest river in Moldova. The Botna River passes through some localities in the center of the Republic of Moldova. Botna springs on the south-eastern slope of a sloping slope in a beech - hornbeam forest. It crosses villages such as Ulmu, Văsieni, Ruseştii Noi and others. The average slope of the river is 1.5 degrees. From the spring to the village of Salcuta, the course of the river is directed to the southeast, then it heads to the northeast. River valley is symmetrical to Bardar, there is a right asymmetry. The width of the meadow varies between 0.5 and 1.0 km in the upper course to 2.0-2.5 km in the lower course. In the past, in the valley of the Costeşti village, the river is meandering. Subsequently, the bed was directed and deepened.
