= Căușeni =

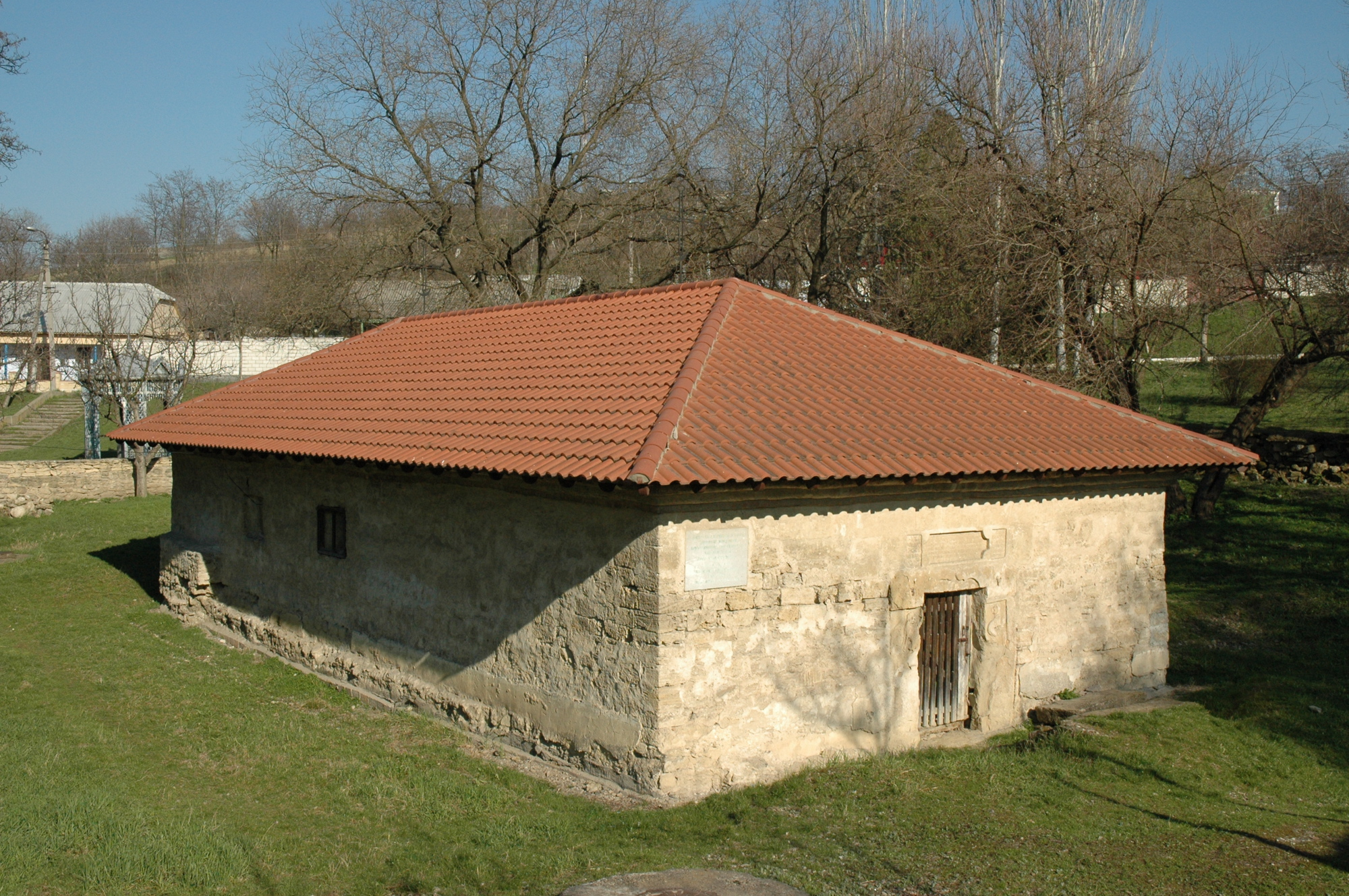
- Assumption of Our Lady Church

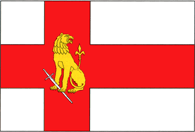
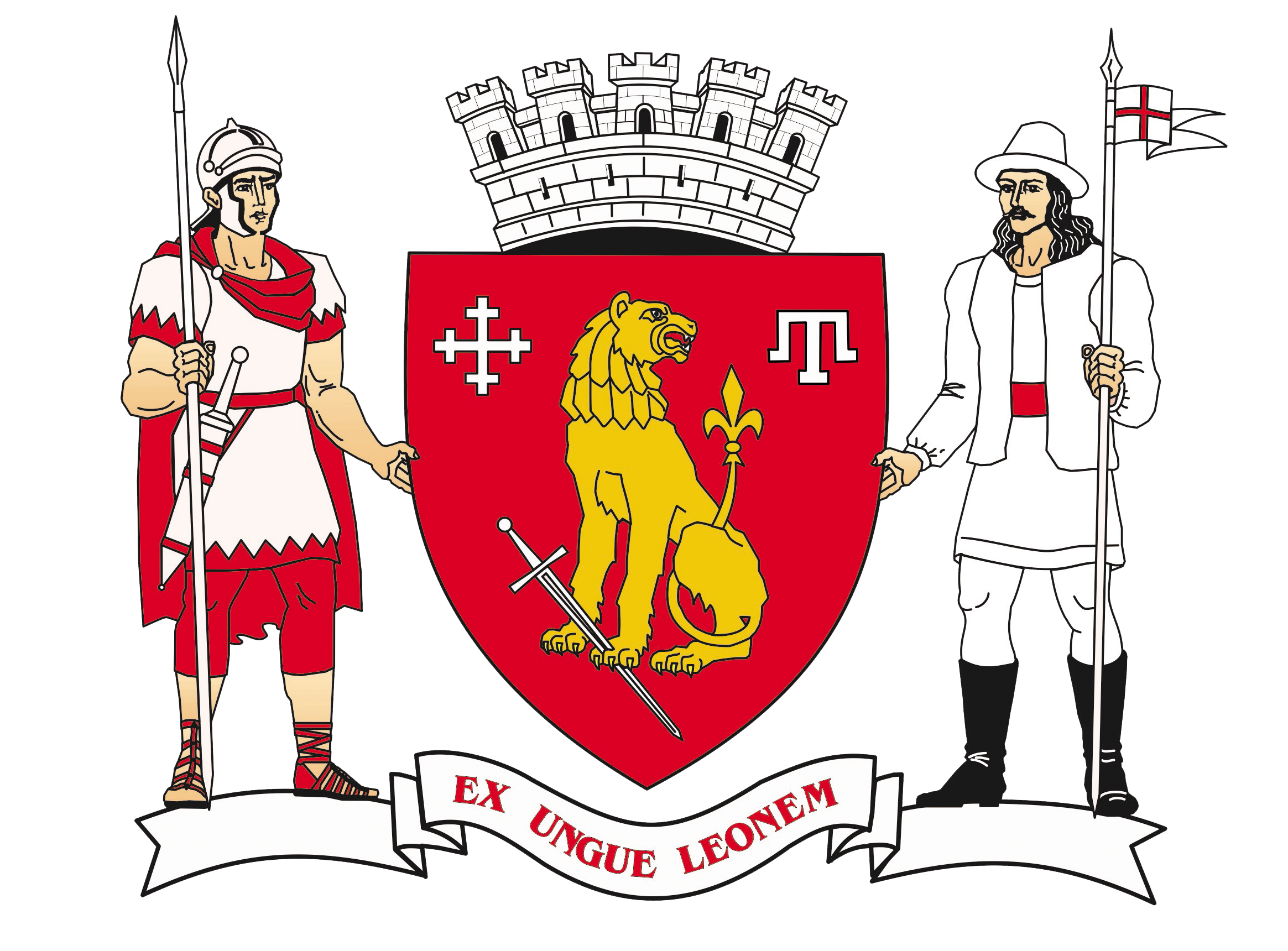
- Flag Coat of arms

- Location within Moldova
- Coordinates: 46°38′N 29°24′E
- Country: Moldova
- County: Căușeni District

Government
  - Mayor: Anatolie Donțu (PPDA)

Area
  - Total: 83.4 km^{2} (32.2 sq mi)

Population (2014)
  - Total: 15,939
  - Density: 191/km^{2} (495/sq mi)
- Time zone: UTC+2 (EET)
  - Summer (DST): UTC+3 (EEST)
- Postal code: MD-4300
- Area code: +373 243
- Climate: Cfb
- Website: Official website

Căușeni (Romanian pronunciation: [kə.uˈʃenʲ]) is a city in the Republic of Moldova and the administrative center of Căușeni District.

== History ==
In the 17th and 18th centuries, Căușeni was the capital of the Budjak Horde.

The 17th century Assumption of Our Lady Church is the oldest surviving building in the town. It is set more than 3 ft (0.91 m) below ground level and preserves the only medieval fresco in the Republic of Moldova. Executed by Walachian painters in a late Byzantine-Romanian style, the interiors feature religious scenes and iconography in vibrant reds, gold, and blues.

At one time it was a vibrant Jewish shtetl. In 1897, 45% of the population (1,675 people) was Jewish, most working in agriculture.

== Geography ==
Căușeni lies in the southeastern part of Moldova, on the Botna river, a tributary of the Dniester. Spread across an area of 83.4 km^{2} (32.2 sq mi), it is one of 30 administrative subdivisions (including 2 cities and 28 communes) within the namesake district. It is part of the Bessarabia region.

== Demographics ==
According to the 2024 census, 13,458 inhabitants lived in Căușeni, a decrease compared to the previous census in 2014, when 15,939 inhabitants were registered.

Ethnic composition of Căușeni (2024)
1. Moldovans (Note: There is an ongoing controversy regarding the ethnic identification of Moldovans and Romanians.) (84.0%)
2. Romanians (8.90%)
3. Ukrainians (2.80%)
4. Russians (2.50%)
5. Others (1.60%)
Linguistic composition of Căușeni (2024)
1. Moldovan (58.7%)
2. Romanian (31.7%)
3. Russian (7.20%)
4. Ukrainian (1.50%)
5. Other (0.80%)

Historical population
Year	Pop.	±%
1970	12,874	—
1979	17,390	+35.1%
1989	20,761	+19.4%
2004	17,757	−14.5%
2014	15,939	−10.2%
2024	13,458	−15.6%

== Gallery ==
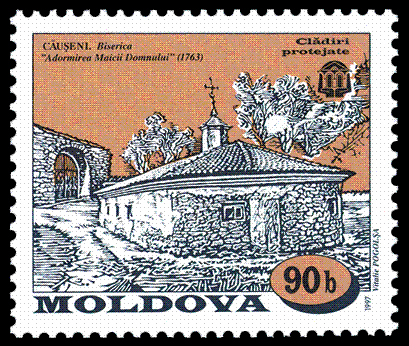
Assumption of Our Lady Church
