= 223rd Rifle Division =

WW2 Soviet Red Army formation

- Active: 1941–1945
- Country: Soviet Union
- Branch: Red Army
- Type: Infantry
- Size: Division
- Engagements: Operation Barbarossa; Battle of Uman; Battle of the Caucasus; Donbas strategic offensive (August 1943); Battle of the Dniepr; Kirovograd offensive Nikopol–Krivoi Rog offensive Uman–Botoșani offensive First Jassy–Kishinev offensive Second Jassy–Kishinev offensive Belgrade offensive Budapest offensive Siege of Budapest; Operation Konrad; Operation Spring Awakening; Vienna offensive Bratislava–Brno offensive
- Decorations: Order of the Red Banner (2nd Formation)
- Battle honours: Belgrade (2nd Formation)

Commanders
- Notable commanders: Maj. Gen. Fyodor Grigorevich Filippov; Col. Vladimir Filippovich Romanov; Maj. Gen. Vladimir Pavlovich Zyuvanov; Col. Nikolai Nikolaevich Shkodunovich; Col. Eibat Atamoglan oglu Eibatov; Maj. Gen. Mikhail Afanasevich Sukhanov; Col. Pyotr Mikhailovich Tatarchevskii; Col. Akhnav Gainutdinovich Sagitov

The 223rd Rifle Division was an infantry division of the Red Army, originally formed as one of the first reserve rifle divisions following the German invasion of the USSR. This first formation had a short and disastrous combat career; after arriving at the front in Ukraine in the first days of August it was immediately encircled and destroyed in the Uman Pocket.

A new 223rd began forming in October 1941 as an Azerbaijani national division in the Transcaucasian Military District. In common with most divisions made up of Caucasian peoples it remained in the rear until that region was directly threatened by the German advance in the summer of 1942. It joined the fighting as part of 44th Army and defended along the Terek River until the German offensive ran out of steam just west of Ordzhonikidze. During December and January the division took part in the pursuit of Army Group A as it retreated into the Taman Peninsula. In March it was moved to the Reserve of the Supreme High Command and was redeployed to Southwestern Front facing German positions in the Donbas. Over the next 13 months the 223rd advanced through the southern Ukraine and into Moldova as part of 3rd Ukrainian Front, mostly within 57th Army. Following the defeat of Romania in August 1944 it advanced into Yugoslavia, winning a battle honor for the liberation of Belgrade and then fighting in cooperation with Tito's Yugoslav partisans. During the campaign in Hungary it helped to secure the outer ring of encirclement around Budapest against Axis counteroffensives, and in the spring of 1945 joined in the final advance into Austria and Czechoslovakia, winning the Order of the Red Banner in the process. After the German surrender it became part of the Southern Group of Forces briefly before being disbanded before November.

== 1st Formation ==
A rifle division provisionally numbered as the 223rd began forming in March 1941 in the Leningrad Military District but by May it was redesignated as the 10th Airborne Brigade. The first 223rd was formed from reservists in July but sources differ as to exactly where. Sharp states that it was formed in the Kharkov Military District. Dunn states that it was formed in the "Southwest Area, District Unknown", possibly in the North Caucasus Military District. Glantz states that as of August the division's personnel were 95 percent Azerbaijani by nationality, of the year groups 1905-1921. Once formed, its official order of battle, based on the shtat (table of organization and equipment) of September 13, 1939, was as follows:

- 1037th Rifle Regiment
- 1039th Rifle Regiment
- 1041st Rifle Regiment
- 818th Artillery Regiment
- 332nd Antitank Battalion
- 577th Antiaircraft Battalion
- 351st Reconnaissance Battalion
- 587th Sapper Battalion
- 752nd Signal Battalion
- 320th Medical/Sanitation Battalion
- 385th Chemical Defense (Anti-gas) Company
- 422nd Motor Transport Battalion
- 378th Motorized Field Bakery
- 969th Field Postal Station
- 353rd Field Office of the State Bank

Maj. Gen. of Technical Troops Fyodor Grigorevich Filippov was appointed to command on July 10. Contrary to the pre-war shtat the division had no howitzer regiment and in fact was never fully manned or equipped. When it arrived at the front it contained just 208 officers and 341 NCOs; 161 horses; 59 artillery pieces of all calibres, including antitank and antiaircraft guns; 78 mortars; and 221 light machine guns.

=== Battle of Uman ===
The division makes its only appearance in the official Red Army order of battle on August 1 where it is listed as being in the reserves of Southern Front. During the following two days it de-trained at Novomyrhorod, just east of Uman, and immediately came under attack from 14th Panzer Division, which was helping to complete the encirclement of the Front's 6th and 12th Armies in the Uman Pocket. Hopelessly unprepared, the division simply fell apart; on August 5 the higher command noted that it had "failed to report" and it was officially disbanded the next day. General Filippov survived the debacle only to be arrested and sentenced to 10 years imprisonment, suspended until after the war. He went on to command the 51st Rifle Division and had his sentence annulled in September 1942, after which he served in a variety of staff roles in the Caucasus region until the end of 1943 and then moved to the training establishment until he retired in 1950.

== 2nd Formation ==
A new 223rd began forming at Quba in the Transcaucasian Military District, based on the 168th Reserve Rifle Regiment, on October 18, 1941, and was soon officially designated as an Azerbaijani national division. Its order of battle was very similar to that of the 1st formation:

- 1037th Rifle Regiment
- 1039th Rifle Regiment
- 1041st Rifle Regiment
- 818th Artillery Regiment
- 332nd Antitank Battalion
- 351st Reconnaissance Company
- 587th Sapper Battalion
- 752nd Signal Battalion (later 785th Signal Company)
- 320th Medical/Sanitation Battalion
- 385th Chemical Defense (Anti-gas) Company
- 422nd Motor Transport Company
- 378th Field Bakery
- 71st Divisional Veterinary Hospital
- 1725th Field Postal Station
- 853rd Field Office of the State Bank

Col. Vladimir Filippovich Romanov was appointed to command the division on the day it began forming and he would remain in this post until February 26, 1942 when he was replaced by Col. Vladimir Pavlovich Zyuvanov, who had previously served as deputy commander of the 347th Rifle Division. As of November 1 it is listed as being in the reserves of Transcaucasian Front, and in common with many units containing a high proportion of non-Russians it remained in the rear until May 15, 1942 when it was moved to the active front, just prior to the German summer offensive into the Caucasus.

== Battle of the Caucasus ==
By the time the German 17th and 1st Panzer Armies began their part in Operation Blau on July 7 the 223rd had been assigned to the Front's 44th Army along with the 414th and 416th Rifle Divisions and the 9th and 10th Rifle Brigades. As of August 1 the Army's composition remained the same and in the face of the German advance the Front was ordered to defend the Terek River with 44th Army as well as elements of 45th and 46th Armies. As the situation deteriorated the 223rd, along with the headquarters of 24th Army, were assigned to gather up all stragglers and retreating elements in the Derbent region to return them to action, in addition to preparing defensive positions. On August 6 the Northern Group of Forces was organized within Transcaucasian Front, consisting of the 44th and 9th Armies and under command of Lt. Gen. I. I. Maslennikov; the Group soon also commanded the 37th and 58th Armies.

=== Operations on the Terek ===
After seizing Maykop on August 10 the 1st Panzer Army, and specifically its XXXX Panzer Corps, turned southeast toward Mozdok and the Terek on the 16th. The Northern Group seemed ill-prepared to resist the advance, being spread over a front of about 420km. 44th Army was on the right flank, defending the Terek from east of Mozdok to the Caspian Sea coast north of Makhachkala with its three rifle divisions, four rifle brigades and scant armor support. Mozdok was taken from elements of the 9th Army on August 25 but reinforcements allowed that Army to hold along the south bank of the Terek. By the following day 1st Panzer Army had come to a virtual standstill. In the first days of September the Soviet defenses were reorganized and by now the 44th Army's front along the Terek ran from northwest of Grozny to Kizlyar facing the 3rd Panzer Division and elements of LII Army Corps screening the panzer army's left flank.

The LII Corps began its thrust across the Terek in the Mozdok sector at 0200 hours on September 2 as a start to a new offensive on Grozny and Ordzhonikidze, but it was not until late on 18th that the Corps' 111th Infantry Division, backed by the 3rd Panzer, managed break through the Soviet defenses at the western end of its bridgehead. The offensive was renewed on September 25 by the 13th Panzer Division but continued to move at a slow pace. On September 29, to secure the defense of the two cities and prepare to go over to the counteroffensive the STAVKA ordered a redeployment:

To secure the defenses along the Makhachkala axis: a)[Occupy] the southern bank of the Terek River from its mouth to Nogai-Mirzy with 389th, 223rd, and 402nd Rifle Divisions and 3rd and 5th Rifle Brigades, while transferring 402nd Rifle Division from Nakhchivan to the Gudermes region...

Besides thwarting 1st Panzer's advance on the two cities, Maslennikov's stout defense of the Terek line also severely undercut German efforts to resume offensive operations at Novorossiysk and toward Tuapse. The planning for the counteroffensive took place during October 23–25 but in the event the 1st Panzer Army launched its own attack on October 25 and this planning fell into abeyance. 44th Army remained defending the south bank of the Terek from Beno-Iurt eastward and northeastward to Kizlyar. The German offensive made steady gains but was halted on the western outskirts of Ordzhonikidze on November 5.

=== Pursuit to Armavir ===
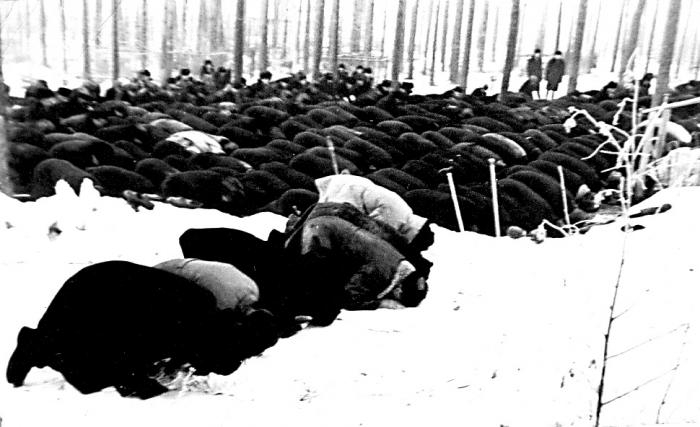
Muslims of the 223rd Rifle Division (including the commander Eibat Atamoglan oglu Eibatov) praying before an attack to capture Mozdok from elements of the 3rd Panzer and 111th Infantry divisions.

On November 10 Colonel Zyuvanov was promoted to the rank of major general. Later that month the 223rd was reassigned to 58th Army, but in December it returned to the 44th. Beginning on November 27 Maslennikov had launched his first counteroffensive against 1st Panzer Army, since the encirclement of 6th Army at Stalingrad had brought all peripheral German actions to a halt. This effort led to inconclusive fighting in which 58th Army was committed late in the operation between 9th and 44th Armies but was unable to advance. The offensive ended on December 7 and the next day Maslennikov consulted with the STAVKA and was given permission to relieve the 44th's 9th Rifle Corps with the 223rd.

Although 1st Panzer Army had held its ground during the counteroffensive it showed obvious weakness on its left wing with a reinforced 44th Army and two cavalry corps hanging over the Ishcherskaya salient north of the Terek. On December 9 the commander of 3rd Panzer Division issued orders for his forces to withdraw from the salient to a new line 15km east of Mozdok, but this line would soon be compromised when the Northern Group went over to the offensive again on December 11 and the operational situation became a free-for-all. 44th Army attacked with the 223rd, 416th, 402nd and 320th Rifle Divisions and 256th Rifle Brigade on a 28km-wide sector from the north bank of the Terek to Sherstobitov, aiming westward toward Mozdok, Shefatov, Avalov and Dovliatin. 9th Rifle Corps and the 409th Rifle Division were in second echelon and each first echelon division had a tank unit or subunit in support. The force faced 3rd Panzer, a regiment of the 111th Infantry, three locally-recruited volunteer battalions and a Cossack cavalry regiment. From December 12-16 the 223rd advanced up to 15km from Galiugaevskaya Station to the northern and eastern approaches to Stoderevskaya, 14-17km east of Mozdok; however, the 409th and 320th Divisions on its right managed to gain 5km at most. On December 17 Maslennikov issued new orders to deploy the three divisions on a 17km-wide sector from the Terek to east of Avalov, while the Army's remaining divisions took over as its main shock group.

This regrouping was quite extensive and did not produce the expected results. The division became involved in heavy fighting, with the support of the 2nd Tank Brigade, the 249th and 488th Tank Battalions, and the 347th Rifle Division, in advancing westward along the Ishcherskaya–Mozdok railway. It gained roughly 12km and captured Stoderevskii Station before losing about half of this ground to counterattacks by Battlegroup Pape (394th Panzergrenadier Battalion) on December 23. In excusing the uneven performance of 44th Army Maslennikov blamed the poor quality of the Azerbaijani soldiers of the 223rd, 409th and 416th Divisions; the STAVKA rejected this, countering:

... these forces are combat ready and, with strengthened attention and combat work with them, can increase the combat readiness... in a short period. However, neither the [G]roup's military council nor the 44th Army developed serious work on military training and education. On the contrary, these units were groundlessly defamed as cowardly and unsuitable for offensive operations. We demand that the Northern Group command and 44th Army immediately liquidate these intolerable relations with these divisions and not turn them into scapegoats covering up poor leadership...

Despite the success of Battlegroup Pape the German Army Group A had already begun a limited withdrawal on December 21. This was preliminary to Hitler's decision on December 28 to withdraw the Group by stages to a shortened line from Mostovskoy to Armavir east of Salsk.

The above discussion was part of the overall planning process for the pursuit of the retreating German and Romanian forces. As part of these plans the 223rd, along with the 320th, 409th and 77th Rifle Division were transferred to 58th Army, which was to pursue in the general direction of Prokhladny and Georgiyevsk. This movement began on January 4, 1943, and gained 15-20km on the Mozdok and Nalchik axes on the first day. In a report on the morning of January 8 the 223rd was said to be on the march to Soldatskaya and Novo-Pavlovskaya. The next day it fought on the eastern outskirts of Urukhskaya with part of its forces while the remainder concentrated in the Staro-Marinskii and Zolskii Station region. On January 10 the division captured Urukhskaya on its own initiative before occupying Georgiyevsk by 1730 hours and digging in. The following day it received orders, along with the rest of 58th Army, to reach Mineralnye Vody and Zheleznovodsk by the end of January 12. The former place was already under attack by Tank Group Filippov.

After advancing roughly 150km northwestward in 11 days the Northern Group's forces tried hard to accelerate their advance on January 12 in order to reach Stavropol (100km distant) and Tikhoretsk (250km distant) as quickly as possible, but this proved very difficult to carry out. In an order issued late on January 13 the 223rd was provisionally reassigned to 44th Army but this was not implemented and it soon came under command of 37th Army. While this was sorted out the division concentrated an area roughly 15km east of Mineralnye Vody. During January 16 it was on the march from that place toward the Kuban River; a further report on January 19 stated it was on the march to the Cherkessk region and came under orders to continue the offensive toward Otradnoe and Armavir as part of 37th Army. During January 21 the division concentrated in Ikon-Khalk, 15km northwest of Cherkessk, while the Northern Group gained as much as 45km and occupied Stavropol. Overnight 1st Panzer Army withdrew to the eastern outskirts of Armavir and that city was occupied by 11th Guards Rifle Corps on January 23.

=== Pursuit to Tikhoretsk ===
On January 24 the Northern Group of Forces was redesignated as the North Caucasus Front, still under command of General Maslennikov. The next day the 223rd took up a defensive line in the Novo-Ukrainskii area. On January 26 the advance resumed with the 37th and 9th Armies converging on Kropotkin and the 223rd reached to within 60km of that place while continuing to protect the Front's left flank. It remained in these positions on the 27th while detachments fought for Temirgoevskaya. It held off a counterattack by up to a battalion of Axis infantry on January 29 before capturing that place and advancing on Sukhoi Kut. As this counterattack indicated, the pace of the advance was beginning to slow. A report from January 30 stated the division had taken Novo-Labinskaya and was developing its advance toward Ust-Labinskaya and on the same day Tikhoretsk was taken by forces of 58th Army. By now the Front was approaching the Taman Peninsula, Krasnodar, and the Gotenkopfstellung fortified line that Army Group A had already prepared. On February 2 the 223rd was located on the eastern outskirts of Voronezhskaya on the Kuban some 50km east of Krasnodar. At this point the pursuit ended as most of 1st Panzer Army withdrew through the positions of 4th Panzer Army south of Rostov-na-Donu and 17th Army dug in at the Gotenkopfstellung.

== Into Ukraine ==
As of the beginning of March the division has been moved to the Front reserves and on March 29 it was moved to the Reserve of the Supreme High Command under command of 46th Army. It remained in the Reserve for several months until it returned to the front lines with this Army in Southwestern Front just before the summer campaign began in July. At the end of May, General Zyuvanov left the division and moved to the training establishment before ending the war as deputy commander of the 416th Rifle Division. He was replaced by Col. Nikolai Nikolaevich Shkodunovich, who had previously commanded the 58th Rifle Division.

46th Army was not committed during the Izyum–Barvenkovo offensive in July and on the 23rd it returned to the Reserve of the Supreme High Command before returning to the front on August 7, again within Southwestern Front. The next day Colonel Shkodunovich was moved to command of the 68th Rifle Corps; he would remain in this position for the duration of the war and reached the rank of lieutenant general in 1949. He was replaced by Col. Mikhail Afanasevich Sukhanov who came over from deputy command of the 279th Rifle Division and would be promoted to the rank of major general on January 17, 1944. When the offensive into the Donbas was renewed on August 13 the 223rd took part along with its Army; following their defeat there and at Kursk, Hitler finally authorized his forces to retreat toward the Dniepr River beginning on September 8. Two days later the Army was transferred to Steppe Front where it remained until early October when it returned to Southwestern Front (3rd Ukrainian Front as of October 20). During the fighting along the Dniepr the division was shifted to the 7th Guards Army in 2nd Ukrainian Front where it was assigned to the 24th Guards Rifle Corps.

=== Battle of the Dniepr ===
On November 13 the Front gained small bridgeheads on both sides of Cherkassy and quickly expanded the northern one until it threatened to engulf the city and tear open the front of the German 8th Army. Later in November the 223rd was shifted to 49th Rifle Corps, still in 7th Guards Army. Through most of December and into January 1944 the Front was generally engaged in attrition battles. 49th Corps was moved in December to 57th Army, still in 2nd Ukrainian Front; the division would remain in this Army for most of the rest of the year. At the start of the Nikopol–Krivoi Rog Offensive on January 30 the 57th Army was located north-northeast of Kryvyi Rih facing the LVII Panzer Corps but played a secondary role in this operation which lasted until the end of February. During its course the Army was transferred to 3rd Ukrainian Front.

=== First Jassy–Kishinev Offensive ===
General Sukhanov left the division on March 10; within a few months he would take command of the 118th Rifle Division and would lead it into the postwar. He was replaced by Col. Pyotr Mikhailovich Tatarchevskii who had briefly led the 77th Rifle Division as a lieutenant colonel in January 1943. On March 26 the Front began a new offensive in the southern sector of western Ukraine. While its left-wing armies struck in the direction of Odessa, the 57th, 37th and 46th Armies on its right wing advanced toward the Dniestr River and the border with Romania. In January the 223rd had been reassigned to 68th Rifle Corps before being moved again in February to 64th Rifle Corps, but by the beginning of April it had returned to 68th Corps, commanded by Maj. Gen. N. N. Multan; this Corps also contained the 93rd and 113th Rifle Divisions.

By early on April 11 the three Armies were pursuing disorganized German forces on the approaches to the east bank of the Dniestr, intending to force the river between April 18-20. During the day the 57th Army covered about 18km with the 68th Corps deployed on the right wing, passing through Velykokomarivka toward Butor, 5km south of Tașlîc. The Front commander, Army Gen. R. Ya. Malinovskii, had assigned 57th Army a 20km-wide sector of the Dniestr from Butor south to opposite Varnița. On this sector the river made a wide U-shaped bend to the west with Butor and Crasnogorca on either side of its entrance. German forces were defending this "bottleneck" as well as the west bank south of Crasnogorca. The terrain on the east bank was generally low, flat and free of obstacles; the west bank was similar north and south of the bend but then rose to about 125m height about 3km from the riverbank and much closer directly west of the bend in the vicinity of the village of Talița. 68th Corps arrived at the east bank at midday on April 12 and the 93rd immediately began crossing with improvised means near Butor after overcoming weak outposts of the German 320th Infantry Division near Șerpeni. By day's end the 93rd held a small but relatively secure foothold on the west bank, while the 113th continued crossing to expand and strengthen it. However, the 223rd failed in its attempt south of Crasnogorca. The Army's 64th and 9th Rifle Corps to the south also failed to gain more than minor footholds over the Dniestr. By April 14 it was clear that Malinovskii's objectives would not be met and he ordered the Army to go over to the defense.

=== Second Jassy–Kishinev Offensive ===
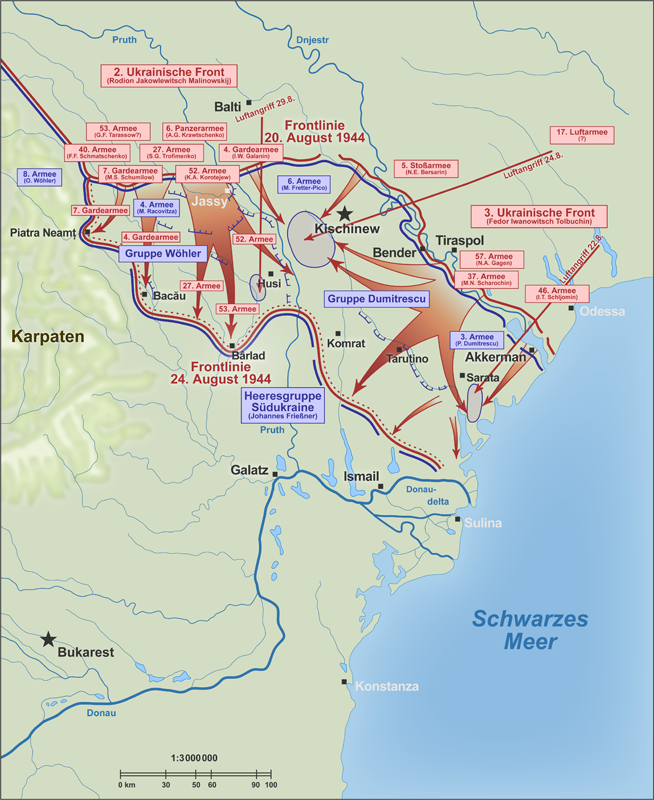
Second Jassy-Kishinev Offensive. Note starting position of 57th Army.

Over the next four months the 57th Army was shifted south, taking up positions north and south of Tiraspol. In the planning for the offensive that was to drive Romania out of the Axis in August it was assigned a 14km-wide attack zone and a 4km sector for launching its main attack, facing elements of the German XXX Army Corps. The main attack sector was centered on the village of Chircăiești on the west bank and the Army was deployed with the 68th Corps, comprising the same divisions as in April, in first echelon. It was tasked to break through the German defense along a sector from the southern part of Hagimus to an unnamed lake 1000m north of Chircăiești, to develop the offensive toward the flanks, and by the end of the day capture the line Gîsca–Tănătari–Ursoaia–Kaushan station. Following this it was to launch an attack on Zolotyanka. The Corps was deployed with the 93rd near Hagimus and the 113th on the Chircăiești sector; following the breakthrough the 223rd would exploit in the direction of Tănătari. The 9th Corps would be committed on the second day and by the following day the two Corps were to reach the Balmaz area. 64th Corps was the Army's third echelon and reserve.

The offensive began on August 20 but 57th Army's and 68th Corps' initial progress was not as great as planned. By 1100 hours the 93rd and 113th had captured the first trench and the railroad bed between Hagimus and Lake Botno and had begun to very slowly develop the attack toward the flanks. The German 15th Infantry Division put up stubborn resistance, forcing the commitment of the 223rd in the center at 2000 hours, but it made insignificant progress. During the day the Corps had penetrated 3-4km into the depth of the German defense and widened the base of the wedge up to 8km, but had failed to carry out its assigned mission. On August 21 the 68th Corps was still being held up by the 15th Infantry and the left flank of the 257th Infantry Division. It attacked three times but each time encountered effective resistance both by fire and counterattacks and only began to advance at 1920 hours following an artillery and aviation preparation, gaining ground in the center and eventually reaching Kaushan station. During the following day the Corps repulsed up to 15 counterattacks and by evening the 223rd had seized the paved road from Bender to Kaushan station, while the 93rd took Hagimus and the 113th began fighting for Tănătari. Meanwhile the 9th Corps, backed by tanks and self-propelled artillery, was committed along the Ursoaia–Kaushan station sector and captured both strongpoints.

Overnight on August 22/23 the German Chișinău group of forces began to retreat toward the Prut River as individual detachments of 57th Army continued fighting through the night. As early as 0200 hours the 68th Corps seized Tănătari and by 0730 the Corps' forward detachment, consisting of elements of the 93rd and 223rd, captured the town and fortress of Bender; by this time the entire Army had gone over to the attack while still facing resistance from XXX Army Corps. Later in the day the main body of the 223rd reached Batyk while its part of the forward detachment advanced to Dzhamana. Over the following days the Army pushed forward to complete the encirclement of the Chișinău group in conjunction with the 2nd Ukrainian Front from the north. On August 25 the division captured Kotovskoye at 1100 hours, which created a favorable situation to split the German forces that were sheltering in the forests south of that place and Molești. At 1500 the Army's forces began to carry out this plan. 68th Corps launched an attack in the direction of Sărata-Galbenă and captured Mereșeni, nearly completing the split. During the day the Army inflicted heavy casualties on the encircled remnants of seven German divisions. On August 26 German resistance was effectively collapsing as the Army pressed north to link up with 37th Army and the 4th Guards Mechanized Corps, and General Malinovskii delivered a surrender ultimatum to the trapped grouping. The next day it was effectively eliminated and 57th Army began pressing toward the Romanian border.

== Into the Balkans ==
On September 4 Colonel Tatarchevskii left the division; he was replaced by Col. Akhnav Gainutdinovich Sagitov, who would remain in command into the postwar. After advancing through southern Romania in early September 57th Army crossed the Bulgarian border on September 8, the day that country declared war on Germany. The Army moved west, south of the Danube, linking to the mobilizing Bulgarian armies to its south, approaching the border of Yugoslavia by September 19 and crossing the river into the bend west of Turnu Severin on the 22nd. The German Army Group F sent the 1st Mountain Division to oppose this move but it could only impose a delay. On October 4 Soviet forces reached Pančevo on the north bank of the Danube 16km downstream from Belgrade and on the 8th the railroad running into the city from the south was cut. On the night of October 14 a combined force of Soviet troops and Yugoslav partisans entered Belgrade and took the city center by the next afternoon. For this feat the division was awarded a battle honor:

BELGRADE - 223rd Rifle Division (Colonel Sagitov, Akhnav Gainutdinovich)... The troops who participated in the battles of Belgrade, by the order of the Supreme High Command of 20 October 1944, and a commendation in Moscow, are given a salute of 24 artillery salvoes from 324 guns.

Later in October the 3rd Ukrainian Front crossed the Sava River and by the end of the month reached the Ruma area, 60km northwest of Belgrade. Due to the low levels of training and armament within the Yugoslav People's Liberation Army, the 68th Corps was left behind to secure the Front's left wing and provide artillery support to the Yugoslavs. The division was assigned a line from Lađevci to Vitkovac to Vrbas. In recognition of this deployment, on November 19 the Corps was removed from 57th Army and subordinated directly to the Front. On November 29, in cooperation with the Yugoslav 2nd Proletarian Division, the 223rd liberated the city of Kraljevo.

=== Hungarian operations ===
As the main forces of the front pushed north to help complete the encirclement of Budapest in the first week of December the 68th Corps began concentrating to force a crossing of the Danube at Vukovar in conjunction with the Danube Flotilla; on December 8 the head of the division's column passed through Ilača. Before this could be attempted priorities were changed and the Corps was pulled into the Front reserves on December 17/18, turning over its combat sector to Bulgarian 1st Army prior to concentrating in the Bonyhád–Szálka area by December 24 prior to reinforcing the 4th Guards Army near Budapest.

Budapest was surrounded by December 26 and during December 30 and 31 the 68th Corps, in conjunction with 20th Guards Rifle Corps, cleared Axis forces out of the southern part of the Vértes Hegyseg Mountains and arrived on their western slopes along a line from Rigo to Környe to Oroszlány–Pusztavám. On January 1, 1945, the German Army Group South began relief operations which continued for most of the month. The main forces of both 4th Guards and 57th Armies were allocated to the external encirclement front. The relief efforts, collectively known as Operation Konrad, were led by the IV SS Panzer Corps. The 223rd was deployed on the 4th Guards' right flank with two rifle regiments in the first echelon and the third in reserve in the Majk–Oroszlány area. This was outside the main attack axis and the division saw little combat during this first counteroffensive, which ended on January 6.

Operation Konrad II began the next day and struck the 20th Guards Corps from Pusztavám to Moha, adjacent to 68th Corps' sector from Szár station to Pusztavám. Following an artillery preparation the assault started at 0920 hours and the 4th Guards Army commander, Army Gen. G. F. Zakharov, immediately began manoeuvring his limited reserves, particularly artillery, in response. This counteroffensive was halted by January 12 in the Pilisszentkereszt area. Konrad III was launched on January 18 and during its course the 223rd was transferred to 46th Army, then on January 22 back to 4th Guards Army where it came under command of 21st Guards Rifle Corps and was ordered to help organize a defense along a line from Tallian to west of Csala to Kisfalud station to Pákozd. The Axis attack finally ran out of steam on January 27. As of February 1 the division had returned to 20th Guards Corps, still in 4th Guards Army. Budapest fell on February 13.

=== Into Austria and Czechoslovakia ===
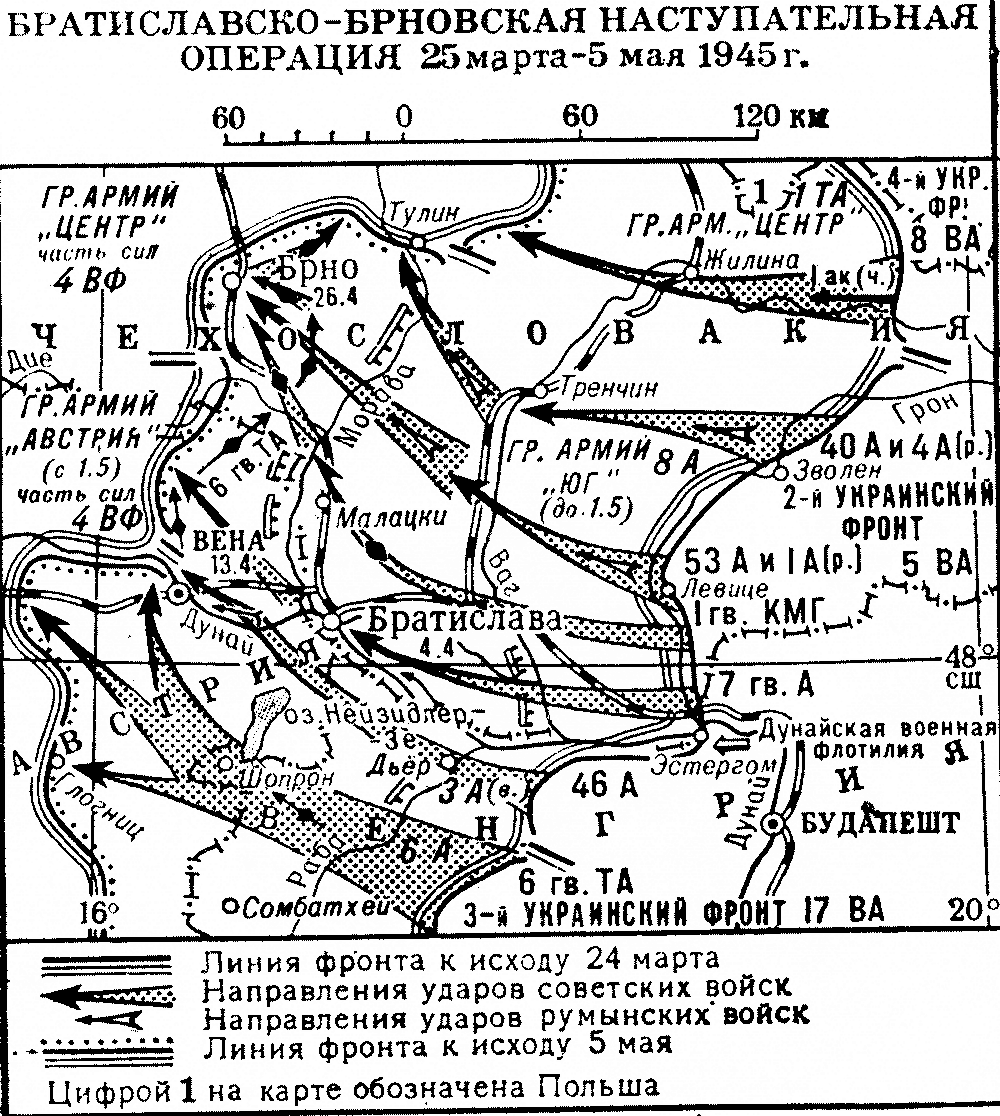
Bratislava-Brno Operation

When March began the 223rd was back in 68th Corps, which was now part of 46th Army in 2nd Ukrainian Front. Following the German "Spring Awakening" offensive in early March the Soviet forces in Hungary went over to the counteroffensive on the 16th. During the advance toward Austria the division broke through part of the German defense of the Transdanubian Mountains and helped capture the towns of Tata, Esztergom and others, for which it would be awarded the Order of the Red Banner on April 26. Later during March it was reassigned yet again, now to the 23rd Rifle Corps in the same Army. It was under these commands on April 13 when the 1037th Rifle Regiment (Lt. Col. Tsarev, Dmitrii Yakovlevich) was awarded the battle honor "Vienna" for its part in the capture of the Austrian capital. Later in the month it was moved to the Army's 75th Rifle Corps and it ended the war under these commands, advancing into Czechoslovakia.

== Postwar ==
Following the German surrender the subunits of the 223rd received further honors on May 17 in recognition for the fighting for Győr and Komárom. The 1037th Rifle Regiment was awarded the Order of Suvorov, 3rd Degree; the 1039th Rifle Regiment won the Order of Kutuzov, 3rd Degree; and the 818th Artillery Regiment was given the Order of Bogdan Khmelnitsky, 2nd Degree. On the same date the 1041st Rifle Regiment was awarded the Order of Kutuzov, 3rd Degree, for the capture of Korneuburg and Floridsdorf. This regiment was also granted the Order of Suvorov, 3rd Degree, on June 4 for its part in the fighting for Stockerau, Jaroměřice, and other Austrian and Czechoslovak towns.

Along with the rest of 46th Army the 223rd, returning to 68th Corps, was soon transferred to the Southern Group of Forces. It was disbanded sometime prior to November.
