= 113th Rifle Division =

113th Rifle Division (September 8, 1939 – September 19, 1941) 113th Rifle Division (September 26, 1941 – July 1945)
- Active: 1939–1945
- Country: Soviet Union
- Branch: Red Army (1939-46)
- Type: Infantry
- Size: Division
- Engagements: Soviet invasion of Poland; Winter War; Operation Barbarossa; Battle of Białystok–Minsk; Battle of Moscow; Battles of Rzhev; Belgorod–Kharkov offensive operation Battle of the Dnieper; Bereznegovatoye–Snigirevka offensive Odessa Offensive; First Jassy–Kishinev offensive Second Jassy–Kishinev offensive Belgrade offensive Siege of Budapest; Operation Konrad; Operation Spring Awakening; Vienna offensive Nagykanizsa–Körmend offensive
- Decorations: Order of the Red Banner (2nd Formation)
- Battle honours: Lower Dniestr (2nd Formation)

Commanders
- Notable commanders: Col. Aleksandr Nikolaevich Nechaev; Maj. Gen. Kristofor Nikolaevich Alaverdov; Maj. Gen. Ivan Andreevich Presnyakov; Col. Konstantin Ivanovich Mironov; Maj. Gen. Evgenii Stepanovich Alyokhin; Col. Pyotr Vasilevich Dmitriev; Col. Latyp Shafikovich Mukhamedyarov; Maj. Gen. Aleksei Mitrofanovich Vlasenko; Col. Pavel Nikolaevich Naidyshev; Maj. Gen. Vasilii Arkadevich Kindyukhin

The 113th Rifle Division was first formed as an infantry division of the Red Army on September 8, 1939, in the Oryol Military District, based on the shtat (table of organization and equipment) of that month. After playing a very minor role in the Soviet invasion of Poland under 4th Army it was stationed near Minsk for several months as it went through a series of partial demobilizations and remobilizations. It was finally mobilized for movement to the Finnish border in mid-December and went into combat as part of 7th Army in February 1940. Its initial attacks against a section of the Mannerheim Line were costly failures, but once the line was broken on another sector it was able to advance toward Viipuri, and in the last days of the war it cleared territory in the Vyborg Bay area. Later in 1940 it was moved to western Belarus (former Polish territory) and was deployed as part of 10th Army toward the frontier on the southern flank of the Białystok salient just before the German invasion. In this very vulnerable position, without time to develop its defenses, it was quickly overrun and destroyed, and finally written off on September 19.

The 5th Moscow People's Militia Division began forming on July 2, and by July 9 was marching to a training ground to the southwest of Moscow. On July 16 it was assigned to 33rd Army of Reserve Front, despite being under strength and largely unequipped. As its training and equipment status improved it was redesignated as the new 113th on September 26, just prior to the start of the final German offensive against Moscow. It was in the process of transferring to 43rd Army of the same Front when the attack began, and was soon pocketed. It emerged from this minus its commander, who was captured, and took up positions covering Borovsk, which fell later during the German advance. Returning to 33rd Army it took part in the Soviet counteroffensive in January 1942, liberating Borovsk and Vereya before advancing toward Vyazma. This narrow thrust was soon encircled and the division fought for several months cut off from the main front until its remnants escaped in small groups in April, losing another commander in the process. After rebuilding it took part in the summer offensive against the Rzhev salient east of Vyazma, with little success. It left 33rd Army in February 1943, initially to be sent north for an offensive to break the siege of Leningrad, but then redirected south in the Reserve of the Supreme High Command to join 57th Army of Southwestern Front. Under this command it took part in Operation Polkovodets Rumyantsev in early August. After retaking Kharkiv as part of Steppe Front it advanced through eastern Ukraine to the Dniepr River, helping to gain one of several lodgements in the Kremenchuk area. It was briefly in 7th Guards Army as the now-2nd Ukrainian Front attempted to expand its holdings on the west bank, but soon returned to 57th Army. Through the winter it took part in fighting in the Dniepr bend before pushing west as part of 3rd Ukrainian Front toward the Southern Buh River where seven of its men became Heroes of the Soviet Union in a crossing operation in late March 1944. In April the 113th reached the Dniestr River and made a crossing but over the following weeks was stymied in its efforts to break out of its bridgehead. In the renewed offensive in August it succeeded in breaking through the Axis defense of the lower Dniestr and received a battle honor. Following this success the division advanced through southern Romania and northern Bulgaria to the border of Yugoslavia and took part in the battle for Belgrade in October, for which it was awarded the Order of the Red Banner. In November 57th Army regrouped to make another crossing of the Danube, first into Croatia and then Hungary as 3rd Ukrainian Front strove to complete the encirclement of Budapest. During January 1945 the 113th helped to defeat the final German effort to relieve the city, and the subsequent last-ditch panzer offensive near Lake Balaton in March, before advancing with its Army into Austria. It was disbanded in July.

== 1st Formation ==
The original 113th was formed at Rylsk in the Oryol Military District on September 8, 1939, on the basis of the 164th Rifle Regiment of the 55th Rifle Division. Maj. Aleksandr Nikolaevich Nechaev, commander of the 164th, was appointed to command of the division and was soon promoted to the rank of colonel. The division was barely assembled when it was loaded on to trains and moved west to the vicinity of Minsk for possible deployment in the invasion of Poland, which began on September 17. After offloading, its personnel and equipment began a road march toward Baranavichy. The division was incorporated into the 10th Rifle Corps of 4th Army on October 5 and crossed the Polish border at two points. The Polish government surrendered the next day, and by October 8 the 113th had concentrated back at Baranavichy. It soon established permanent quarters at Pukhavichy, near Minsk.

== Winter War ==
Through October and November the 113th went through a confusing series of partial demobilizations and remobilizations which largely disrupted any coherence as a fighting unit. On November 30 the USSR invaded Finland, and on December 12 Nechaev was alerted to bring his division to full combat readiness and prepare for redeployment, although he was not informed of the destination. The first trains left from Pukhavichy on December 16 for Orsha, but the loading was not completed until December 30. The division crossed the frontier at Mainila on the Karelian Isthmus on January 5, 1940, assigned to 28th Rifle Corps, and then went into a period of intensive training under command of 7th Army. Upon arriving near the front line on January 30 elements of the 113th relieved the 768th Rifle Regiment of the 138th Rifle Division.

The division's objective was to break through the Karhula fortified area of the Mannerheim Line by taking Hill 38.2 from up to two companies of the Finnish 11th Infantry Regiment. The attack would be led by the 513th Rifle Regiment against the northeast and east slopes and the 725th Regiment against the west slopes; the 679th Regiment would move one battalion to a point 1.5km northwest of Siprola. These moves were made without any prior reconnaissance. Following a 40-minute artillery preparation the attack began at 1040 hours on February 5 and was met with intense machine gun, mortar, and artillery fire from the hill. Only minor penetrations were made in a full day of fighting, at the cost of considerable losses, and Nechaev ordered a withdrawal to the start line. As a result he was relieved of his command, being replaced by a Colonel Kuznetsov as acting commander. On July 15, 1941, Nechaev would take command of the 283rd Rifle Division and would serve with distinction through the war with Germany, being promoted to the rank of lieutenant general in September 1943 and commanding both the 28th and 106th Rifle Corps.

A further attack by the 679th and 513th Regiments on February 7 also failed. The next day a further effort followed a two-hour artillery preparation, focused on a hill called "Pear" and Hill 38.2, but although the advanced obstacles were reached and crossed, Finnish fire again forced the riflemen back to their start line with considerable casualties. On February 9 the 3rd Battalion of the 513th managed to take the hill called "Grusha", but was immediately counterattacked and nearly encircled. The headquarters of Northwestern Front ordered an offensive across the entire Karelian front for February 11, and the same day Col. Kristofor Nikolaevich Alaverdov was appointed to command of the division. This cavalry officer had most recently served as an instructor at the Frunze Military Academy. He would remain in command for the rest of the existence of the 1st formation, being promoted to the rank of Kombrig on March 21, which would be modernized to major general on June 4.

For this attack the division was reinforced with artillery and tanks of the 1st Tank Division, but again failed to take Hill 38.2, although minor gains were made elsewhere. The goal for the next day was to use these gains as a base to reach the crossroads 500m from the village of Yläkylä in order to bypass the strongpoint at Karakhul and take Hill 38.2 from a new direction. This was stopped at or just beyond the barbed wire, again at high cost. The 725th Regiment again made minor gains near the Yazyk Grove, but failed to support the 650th Rifle Regiment of the 138th Division on its right. Between February 9-12 the division lost 341 men killed, including 12 junior officers, plus 466 wounded (93 junior officers), while one 76mm gun, one 45mm antitank gun, and 20 heavy machine guns, were disabled.

=== Advance to Vyborg Bay ===
Late on February 13 the 123rd Rifle Division completed its breakthrough of the Mannerheim Line near Lähde, and while the 113th prepared on February 15 for a further attack on Hill 38.2 Mannerheim authorized the general Finnish retirement to the Intermediate Line at 1600 hours. During February 17 resistance in front of the division gradually melted away. By February 20 it was advancing on Viipuri behind the left flank of the 138th, encountering notable resistance near Porlampi and Hannukkalan-saari. The commander of the 513th Regiment, Maj. Timofei Stepanovich Ozerov, was killed in action in the battle for the railway station at Sommee. This place was protected by the remains of an old fortified line, part of the Intermediate Line, and the fighting continued until February 23 when the station was captured. The division remained along this line until February 27 when it was tasked with the taking of Nuora and the Lihaniemi Peninsula. This was largely successful until March 2 when a fort on the eastern end of Turkin-Sari Island was unexpectedly encountered. Machine gun fire from this position caused serious casualties among the riflemen crossing the ice of Vyborg Bay. This fighting continued until the morning of March 9, when Finnish troops began withdrawing in small groups across the bay. In the final days before the ceasefire on March 12 the division continued clearing the peninsula and several islands offshore.

== Operation Barbarossa ==
Following the Winter War the 113th returned to Belarus and was stationed at Slutsk. In May 1941, along with four other divisions of the Western Special Military District, it left the District reserves to move closer to the new frontier with Germany. As of June 22 it was stationed at the town of Siemiatycze and nearby villages under command of 10th Army's 5th Rifle Corps (with 13th and 86th Rifle Divisions). Its order of battle was as follows:

- 513th Rifle Regiment
- 679th Rifle Regiment
- 725th Rifle Regiment
- 451st Artillery Regiment
- 416th Howitzer Artillery Regiment
- 239th Antitank Battalion
- 49th Antiaircraft Battalion
- 149th Reconnaissance Battalion
- 204th Sapper Battalion
- 228th Signal Battalion
- 201st Medical/Sanitation Battalion
- 150th Chemical Defense (Anti-gas) Platoon
- 113th Motor Transport Battalion
- 139th Field Bakery
- 195th Divisional Repair Depot
- 350th Artillery Repair Park
- 83rd Field Postal Station
- 406th Field Office of the State Bank

The defense sector allocated to the division stretched from Ciechanowiec in the north to the boundary with the 49th Rifle Division of 4th Army to the south. Across the Bug River, Army Group Center deployed the right flank of IX Army Corps (292nd Infantry Division) and the left flank of XXXXIII Army Corps (252nd Infantry Division).

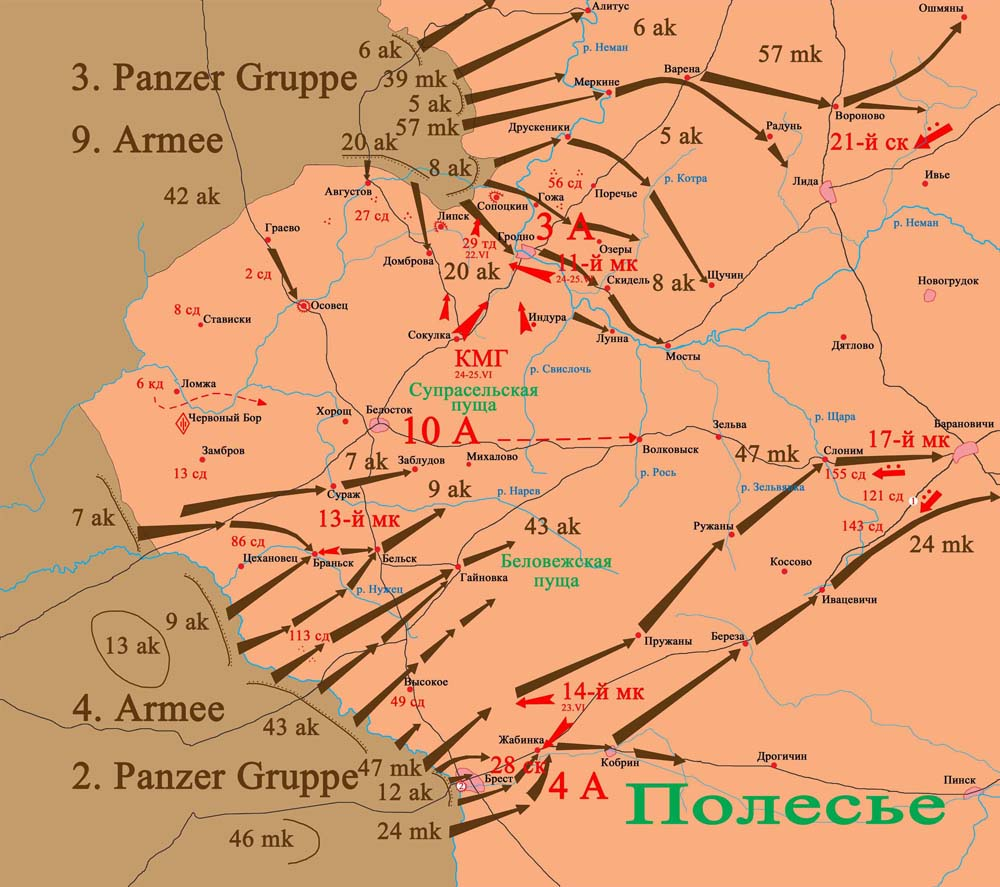
Battle of Białystok. Note position of the 113th.

10th Army, and the Białystok salient in general, was highly vulnerable as it was already surrounded on three sides, with panzer groups to the north and south. This was made worse by the late deployment to the frontier, which gave General Alaverdov and his men no time to prepare plans, construct fortifications, or coordinate with neighboring units. Furthermore, the OKH was aware of the boundary between 10th and 4th Armies, the natural target for a penetration operation once the Bug was crossed. On the first morning of the war the 113th was struck hard by artillery fire and then overwhelmed by the infantry advance, largely by the 292nd Infantry. The 725th Regiment withdrew to the positions of the 49th Division while the remaining survivors fell back toward Białystok. Already by July 1 the division had disappeared from Western Front's order of battle. On the same day Alaverdov, who had been wounded in the thigh on the opening day, was captured with a number of his subordinates, although he remained in nominal command until August 17. Initially imprisoned at Biała Podlaska he was eventually sent to Flossenbürg concentration camp for pro-Soviet agitation among his fellow prisoners. He would be executed there in April 1942. The 113th was officially written off on September 19, along with most of the other units trapped in the Białystok pocket.

== 5th Moscow People's Militia Division ==
The 5th Moscow Opolcheniye Division was formed between July 2-6, 1941, chiefly in the Frunzenskii City District (today largely within the Western Administrative Okrug). It was one of 12 such divisions formed in accordance with a decree of the State Defense Committee made officially on July 4, with an initial target of raising 200,000 volunteers, with weapons and equipment to be supplied by the Moscow Military District. By July 5 68,000 men plus 10,500 officers and NCOs had been signed up. The 5th contained a high percentage of well-educated personnel, including newly-graduated students. Its order of battle until September 1 was as follows:

- 1st, 2nd, 3rd Rifle Regiments
- 45mm Antitank Battalion
- 76mm Artillery Battalion
- Reconnaissance Company
- Sapper Battalion
- Signal Battalion
- Medical/Sanitation Battalion
- Auto Transport Company

Maj. Gen. Ivan Andreevich Presnyakov was appointed to command on the day the division began forming. This officer had last commanded a rifle regiment in 1928 before moving to the training establishment, most recently as chief of combat training for the Arkhangelsk Military District. Early on July 9 his soldiers, with horse-drawn guns, began a march of some 40km on the Borovskoye Highway to its training ground, an ordeal for the city-born men. Once there, they were issued with captured Polish rifles, without ammunition, and black uniform shirts. As of July 15 the division had 7,391 personnel on strength, but the equipment situation had barely improved. The following day it was assigned to the newly-formed 33rd Army in Reserve Front. By July 28 the total manpower had increased to 11,700, nearly its authorized strength, but the supply of small arms was a mixed bag; one regiment reported having 1,680 Mosin–Nagant rifles, 340 SVT-40 semiautomatic rifles, 32 old light machine guns, and 42 Colt medium machine guns. This regiment had no mortars at all or any other heavy weapons. On July 30 the division was at Tishnevo near Borovsk when its personnel took the oath of allegiance to the USSR, and three days later took up positions near Spas-Demensk. The divisional and regimental banners were received on August 12-13, perhaps prematurely because on September 1 the subunits all received new numbers:

- 1288th, 1290th, 1292nd Rifle Regiments
- 972nd Artillery Regiment
- 696th Antiaircraft Battalion
- 471st Reconnaissance Company
- 860th Signal Battalion
- 494th Medical/Sanitation Battalion
- 333rd Chemical Defense (Anti-gas) Company
- 330th Auto Transport Company
- 263rd Field Bakery

In accordance with a decree of September 19 the 5th Moscow Militia Division was redesignated as the new 113th Rifle Division on September 26.

== Operation Typhoon ==
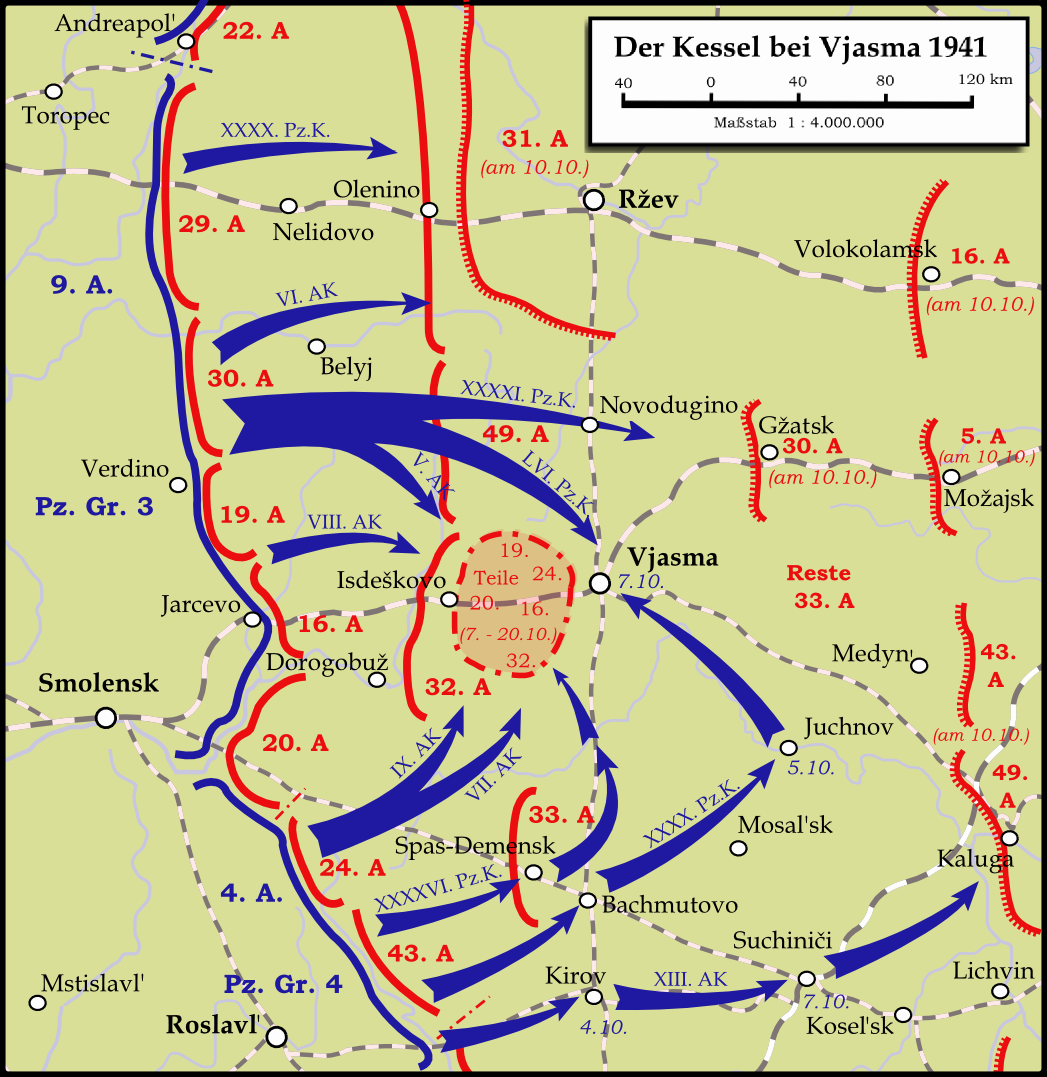
Operation Typhoon. Note position of 43rd Army.

General Presnyakov remained in command of the division, which remained in 33rd Army on October 1, but was in the process of transferring to the second echelon of 43rd Army. Current and future changes or additions to its order of battle were as follows:

- 239th Antitank Battalion
- 275th Antiaircraft Battery (later 275th Battalion, until May 6, 1943)
- 149th Reconnaissance Company (later 471st)
- 204th Sapper Battalion (later 456th)
- 228th Signal Battalion (later 674th Signal Battalion, 860th Signal Company)
- 201st Medical/Sanitation Battalion (later 494th)
- 150th Chemical Defense (Anti-gas) Company
- 203rd Auto Transport Company
- 21st Divisional Veterinary Hospital
- 932nd Field Postal Station
- 1140th Field Office of the State Bank

In addition, in the first days of the coming offensive the division would be supported by the original Guards Mortar unit, the "Flerov" battery of BM-13 130mm launchers.

Army Group Center launched its final drive on Moscow on September 30 in the south, and October 2 in the north. 33rd Army was still in its second echelon defenses before Spas-Demensk, behind the first-echelon 24th and 43rd Armies. In theory, Reserve Front, under command of Marshal S. M. Budyonny, formed the backup for the front line, but its four armies, mostly consisting of untried troops, were stretched over a line 258km long.

Upon arriving in 43rd Army the 113th was assigned a second echelon sector from Gar to Sergeevka to Yasnaya Polyana. The Army commander, Maj. Gen. P. P. Sobennikov, was well aware of increased German activity across the Desna River, and further confirmation of the impending attack came with the arrival of three deserters of three Heer soldiers of Czech nationality. At 0850 hours on October 2 Budyonny's headquarters reported to the STAVKA:

... at 0615 the enemy opened a hurricane of artillery and mortar fire on the entire front of 43rd Army and at 0630 went on the attack with up to a battalion in the Novosel'tsy area and up to a battalion in the center. Serebniaka has been taken.

In fact, Reserve Front had been struck by 15 divisions of 4th Army and 2nd Army, four of which were panzer or motorized. By noon the first line had been penetrated by infantry supported by tanks and aircraft; a panzer and a motorized division of XXXXVI Motorized Corps were being committed into the gap to exploit toward Spas-Demensk.

The 53rd Rifle Division had taken the main blow and its remnants fell back to a wooded area northwest of Zhilino. By 1430 hours up to 100 tanks had broken through to Betlitsa Station, which was 22km in the rear. Sobennikov decided to counterattack with two regiments of the 149th Rifle Division, supported by the 149th and 144th Tank Brigades, to block the Warsaw Highway. This effort was broken up by air attacks, and by day's end the leading units of 3rd Panzer Group had covered 40km, coming up against the defenses of 33rd Army. The 113th, which had not had time to prepare defenses, was caught in the middle. On October 3 the XXXX Motorized Corps continued to advance on Spas-Demensk and Yukhnov. Budyonny had by now realized that 43rd Army was being attacked across its entire front and was withdrawing without orders. He directed Sobennikov to take up a new line along the Shuitsa and Snopot rivers, 35-40km behind the original front. By the end of the day up to 100 German tanks had reached the Snopot. The battered 113th, 53rd and 149th Divisions passed through the sketchy defenses of the 17th Rifle Division along this line during the day.

At 1420 hours on October 4 Reserve Front headquarters reported, in part:

3. The army commander [Sobennikov], despite an order of the Front commander to defend the Snopot' River, issued an order for the retreat of the 53rd Rifle Division in the direction of Nikolskoe and further on toward Spas-Demensk, and of the 149th and 113th Rifle Divisions and the 148th Tank Brigade to the area of Novo-Aleksandrovskoe, where they were to take up a defense.

Budyonny was, in fact, out of contact with Sobennikov and had sent his deputy, Lt. Gen. Bogdanov, at 0400 to restore order in the Army and even take over command if necessary. 33rd Army was also out of contact. Later, on October 9, that Army's military council would report to the STAVKA's L. Z. Mekhlis on the rapid penetration, in which it mentioned that the 1316th Rifle Regiment of its 17th Division had been forced to defend a 15km-wide sector which had been held by the entire 113th before it was moved to 43rd Army.

=== Fighting in encirclement ===
Budyonny issued his Combat Order No. 34/op at 0555 hours on October 6, issuing new assignments to his armies. The 43rd, now with five divisions, was to "occupy and firmly defend the line Gorodechnia–Buda–Kliuchi–Glagol'nia–Mosal'sk–Serpeisk–Lomakino." This line had already been taken by German forces in several places. The Front itself would move its headquarters to Maloyaroslavets. Budyonny's priority was to delay the German advance on Vyazma in hopes of rescuing the deeply pocketed 24th Army. A report sent at 0200 on October 7 to Reserve Front headquarters by Kombrig Lyubarsky of Sobennikov's staff stated in part that "there has been no information on the situation of the 113th and 149th Rifle Divisions." The condition of the Army can be determined from a further statement that "The divisions no longer exist as combat units, and there are small groups of infantry soldiers, specialized elements and artillery who have become demoralized by enemy aviation." On the same day the main German encirclement was closed near Vyazma.

The scattered units and men of 43rd Army, or those who were still under command, were expected to fall back to the Gzhatsk area, but this place fell on October 9. On the same date a report from the headquarters of German 4th Army stated:

The commander of the 5th Soviet Division [now the 113th] with several commissars and approximately 600 troops conducted an attack on a Luftwaffe construction detachment 12 kilometres southeast of Spas-Demensk. The 19th Panzer Division has been moved against them. Fighting is on-going.

This effectively diverted the 19th from being committed to the drive on Moscow. Every effort was now being made to withdraw from the encirclement. 43rd Army had been directed to move toward Pletnevka, 10km west of Kaluga, but this route was blocked. Sobennikov's headquarters arrived in Lapshinka, 24km south of Naro-Fominsk, at 1300 hours on October 10, but without its signals department, which was still en route to Pletnevka. Orders were dispatched by courier to the Army's units to pull back from the route to Kaluga, and assembly areas were designated for the four rifle divisions and two tank brigades. By now the 43rd had no base of supply and had completely run out of food and fuel. On the same day General Presnyakov was wounded and captured. Initially imprisoned at Zamość he was later sent to Nuremburg, and on January 5, 1943, shared the same fate as General Alaverdov, being executed for pro-Soviet agitation. Col. Konstantin Ivanovich Mironov took over command; he had previously led the 147th Rifle Division.

The 113th, with 43rd Army, came under command of Western Front on October 10, and the next day its remnants began covering Borovsk, as well as preventing an outflanking move against Maloyaroslavets, which was being held by 3,500 cadets of the Podolsk Infantry and Artillery Schools. On October 18 the division returned to 33rd Army.

Later in the month the division came under renewed German pressure and began to fall back in disorder, without permission. In order to address this situation Western Front sent a group of political officers and political workers who were successful in restoring its combat effectiveness, which had suffered in the escape from encirclement.

== Battle of Moscow ==
As of November 16 the Army, under command of Lt. Gen. M. G. Yefremov, was constructing defenses along its entire front in anticipation of a renewed offensive on Moscow; it had just four divisions under command. The 113th was defending a 9km-wide sector from Ryzhkovo to outside Sliznevo.

The fighting resumed on the morning of December 1 when a powerful German artillery and mortar bombardment struck along the entire front of 33rd Army, except the sector defended by the 222nd Rifle Division. Under cover of this fire as well as airstrikes the German forces launched an attack against the Army's left flank. With Yefremov thus distracted a German motorized force, supported by 60-70 tanks, forced the Nara River near the village of Novaya and, pressing forward, reached the Naro-Fominsk–Kubinka road, after which they continued to attack in the direction of the Minsk–Moscow highway. The 113th was in action against a large German grouping, supported by 30 tanks, in the area of Kamenskoe and Klovo. The 1290th Rifle Regiment was routed and the panzers moved on toward Sergovka. The 110th Rifle Division was also attacked south of Naro-Fominsk and its front was penetrated. These advances threatened the rear of 5th Army, but the situation was restored by that Army's 32nd Rifle Division which took up a defensive position near Akulovo. A combination of obstacles, mines and antitank fire caused the panzers to bunch up near the road, leaving them vulnerable to direct artillery fire and infantry using Molotov cocktails. As many as 35 tanks were knocked out and the German column fell back to try another route. By December 3-4 the main fighting was occurring in the Yushkevo–Burtsevo area and by the end of the next day the Red Army claimed to have inflicted 7,500 casualties as well as 27 tanks, two armored cars, 36 guns, ten mortars, and other trophies. Meanwhile the 110th halted and then cleared up the breakthrough on its sector and the German forces on the 33rd Army's front were forced back to their start line on the Nara.

=== Soviet Counteroffensive ===
33rd Army began its main counteroffensive on December 18. Yefremov had been tasked to break through along the Naro-Fominsk–Kamenskoye sector with the main blow directed at Balabanovo and Maloyaroslavets; his Army was facing the depleted 3rd Motorized, 183rd Infantry, and 20th Panzer Divisions, plus part of 15th Infantry Division. He formed a shock group from his 113th, 110th and 338th Rifle Divisions and 1st Guards Motorized Rifle Division while the 222nd acted in a pinning role and the 201st Rifle Division formed the second echelon. The shock group deployed on a 16km-wide frontage while the 222nd covered a 14km sector. The offensive was planned in conjunction with the adjacent 43rd Army. The attack began following an hour-long artillery preparation. The 113th and 1st Guards made a crossing of the Nara River and the 113th bypassed Chichkovo from the northwest before becoming involved in forest fighting. By the end of December 20, despite the commitment of the 201st Division, the offensive was developing poorly and the Army's units remained approximately in the places they had begun.

==== Battle of Borovsk ====
On January 2, 1942 the 113th and 93rd Rifle Divisions began fighting to retake Borovsk. Elements of the 93rd penetrated into the town, becoming involved in street fighting that continued overnight and through the next day. The defenders were heavily armed and put up stiff resistance in order to cover the retreat of other German units attempting to withdraw further west. During January 3 one regiment of the 93rd cut off the routes to the north and overnight the 201st Rifle Division took Redkino, straddling the road between Borovsk and Mityaevo. Overnight the remaining defenders withdrew in small groups by infiltrating through Red Army lines, and by 0600 hours the town was completely cleared. 33rd Army now set its sights on the fortified town of Vereya.

The fighting for this place began on January 18 when the 113th, 1st Guards, and 222nd advanced to its outskirts while the remaining divisions of the Army were destroying small garrisons to the northwest, cutting any German retreat in this direction. At 0430 hours the next morning Vereya was captured and the surviving German troops fell back under the cover of rearguards.

== Rzhev-Vyazma Offensive ==
While the fighting for Vereya was going on Yefremov was already giving orders to extend the drive toward Vyazma. On January 20 the 113th and 338th were moving to a new concentration area. This move came under attack from the air, and on January 22 the division was attacked while on the march by a group of German sub-machine gunners from Shevnevo, although this was beaten back from the outskirts of Shanskii Zavod. A detachment was left there as a covering force while the main body continued moving west. The next day it began to move into the area around Temkino. Such small-scale battles distracted the divisions from their goal, and by January 26 the Army was badly strung out; the 113th was reported as having "occupied Vyazishche and Lushchikhino at 1500, bypassing the enemy in Ivanovskoe." On the same day the commander of Western Front, Army Gen. G. K. Zhukov, informed Yefremov that during the morning the cavalry group of Kalinin Front, reinforced with motorized infantry, had reached a point 12km west of Vyazma and cut the main railroad and all other German withdrawal routes. He ordered Yefremov to "reach the area Krasnyi Kholm–Gredyakino–Podrezovo by forced march and link up with the airborne landing by the 4th Airborne Corps and the Kalinin Front's cavalry."

During January 27 the 113th and 338th continued to advance without meeting resistance, and the 113th took Skotinino. By now the daytime temperatures were down to -35 degrees C, which slowed and made all operations more difficult. The next day the division arrived in the area around Kuznetsovka and Morozovo, while about half of the Army remained tied down in local fighting. By January 31 the German command had managed to concentrate three or four regiments which attacked Iznoski in an effort to delay this main body to the southwest. German air activity also increased. One of the 113th's regiments reached Dashkovka, while the other two moved up to Zheltovka and Stukolovo. By the night of February 1/2 the lead divisions had taken up jumping off positions for an attack on Vyazma. The 113th was in the area of Dashkovka and Yastrebovo, intending to attack toward Boznya; the 338th and the 160th Rifle Division were also in position. Fighting began near Alekseevskoe on February 2, and the next day the divisions had linked up with the 1st Guards Cavalry Corps, increasing the scope of the battle. Yefremov's deep advance along such a narrow front put his Army in a dangerous position of being cut off by German counterattacks.

=== 33rd Army Encircled ===
As the Army fought for Vyasma the OKH was already taking steps to counter the penetration. Up to six understrength divisions had been moved to the area and on February 2–3 Soviet gains north and south of Yukhnov were driven back, leaving the 33rd, as well as 1st Guards Cavalry and the 8th Airborne Brigade all but completely encircled. Zhukov ordered the 43rd Army to break through to the encircled group; this effort would also soon involve the 49th and 50th Armies. However, the command of Army Group Center reinforced its troops defending Yukhnov and all attempts to break in failed. The supply situation soon became catastrophic, especially given the lack of air transport. The 33rd turned to local partisans for assistance and support, drafting local men into the ranks under an order signed by Stalin on February 9. For most purposes the pocketed Army operated as partisans over the next months.

At the beginning of March an attempt was made the breach the ring of encirclement by units of 33rd Army from within and a shock group of 43rd Army from without. The German command brought up additional forces. The gap between the two attacking Soviet groups narrowed to just 2km but they were unable to overcome the remaining distance. Conditions inside the pocket worsened on a daily basis. On March 11 a total of 12,780 personnel remained trapped and a report by Western Front's chief of the NKVD Special Department (dated April 8) stated in part:

... a significant amount of the artillery has been idled by a lack of fuel and ammunition. Casualties from 1 February to 13 March 1942 amount to 1,290 killed and 2,351 wounded. We are not receiving replacements... Sustenance... consists of a small quantity of boiled rye and horse meat. There is no salt, fats or sugar at all. Due to the starvation diet, cases of illness among the troops are becoming more frequent... on the night of 14 March, two soldiers died of emaciation.

Further orders from the Front demanded that 43rd, 49th and 50th Armies relieve the pocket by March 27, but the general exhaustion of the Red Army after months of counterattacking, plus the onset of the spring rasputitsa, doomed these efforts to failure. Meanwhile, Army Group Center was determined to clear its rear areas. Seven divisions were concentrated against the pocket which was soon reduced to an area of roughly 10km by 25km. In early April the 33rd was finally authorized to withdraw through forests under partisan control in the direction of Kirov, a distance of up to 180km. In the attempt Yefremov was wounded and took his own life to avoid capture. Only a few thousand men managed to filter out to friendly lines. Colonel Mironov was wounded during the withdrawal and killed on April 1 while being carried on a stretcher. Kombrig Evgenii Stepanovich Alyokhin, who had been arrested during the Great Purge and subsequently rehabilitated, was given command of the 113th; he would have his rank modernized to major general on October 1.

== Battles of Rzhev ==
As of the beginning of May the 33rd Army consisted of just five battered rifle divisions; on May 24 the 338th, having already lost a rifle regiment to the 160th, was officially disbanded to provide replacements for the 113th. During the early summer it would remain in this four-division (110th, 113th, 160th, 222nd Rifle Divisions) configuration. In the planning for Western Front's summer offensive against the eastern face of the Rzhev salient at least one map-solution was prepared in June for a prospective offensive by 49th, 33rd and 5th Armies to seize Vyazma, although this came to nothing. As the planning continued 33rd Army was also considered for advances in the direction of Gzhatsk and west of Medyn. In the end the Army was to be given a large role in the offensive. When it joined the offensive on August 13 it had been reinforced with the 7th Guards Rifle Corps, two more divisions and four rifle brigades. It faced six German infantry regiments along the front line on its breakthrough sector but had only a 3.5:1 advantage in infantry and 1.6:1 in artillery, considerably less than the other Soviet armies involved, apart from 30th Army on the opposite end of the offensive front. Given this relative weakness in force correlation and the fact that the main offensive had begun more than a week earlier, eliminating any element of surprise, the attack of 33rd Army soon faltered.

The Army resumed its offensive on August 24 and made some penetrations on 3rd Panzer Army's front, but these were soon contained. Another effort began on September 4 in conjunction with 5th Army, but was halted three days later. During this period 20th Army was also attempting to reach Gzhatsk but went over to the defense on September 8. For the rest of the month the southern armies of the Front were officially engaged in "battles of local significance". From August 10 to September 15 the personnel losses of 33rd Army are listed as 42,327 killed, wounded and missing while gaining from 20 to 25km to the west and northwest. The heavy losses were attributed to "densely-packed formations... [while] there was almost no coordination between fire and maneuver..." among other factors.

=== Operation Mars ===
In planning for the next offensive General Zhukov conceived a two-phase operation beginning against the northern part of the salient to be known as Operation Mars, with a subsequent phase to the south likely under the name of Operation Jupiter. During October and November the German 9th Army noted a Soviet buildup in the sector east of Vyazma, including the 3rd Tank Army, two tank corps, and reinforcements for 5th Army. 33rd Army would also take part. Due to postponements Mars did not begin until November 25, at which time the start date for the second phase was tentatively set for December 1. By then Mars was badly bogged down and although Zhukov continued to hope Jupiter could be implemented as late as December 9, on December 16 Stalin ordered the 3rd Tank Army to move south.

==== Move to the south ====
In the wake of the failure of Mars, Zhukov began planning a new operation designated Polarnaya Zvezda, which would break through to Leningrad from the south after Operation Iskra's success in breaking through from the east. To this end, under STAVKA Order No. 46026 of January 31, 1943, the 113th was designated as one of 10 rifle divisions, largely from Western Front, to be sent to Ostashkov for reassignment to Northwestern Front. This plan was disrupted when German 16th Army evacuated the Demyansk salient in late February, creating a pool of reserves. On February 2 the division entered the Reserve of the Supreme High Command in preparation for this move, but was redirected south as part of 3rd Tank Army, arriving in Southwestern Front by the beginning of April. Later that month it was reassigned to 57th Army in the same Front.

== Into Ukraine ==
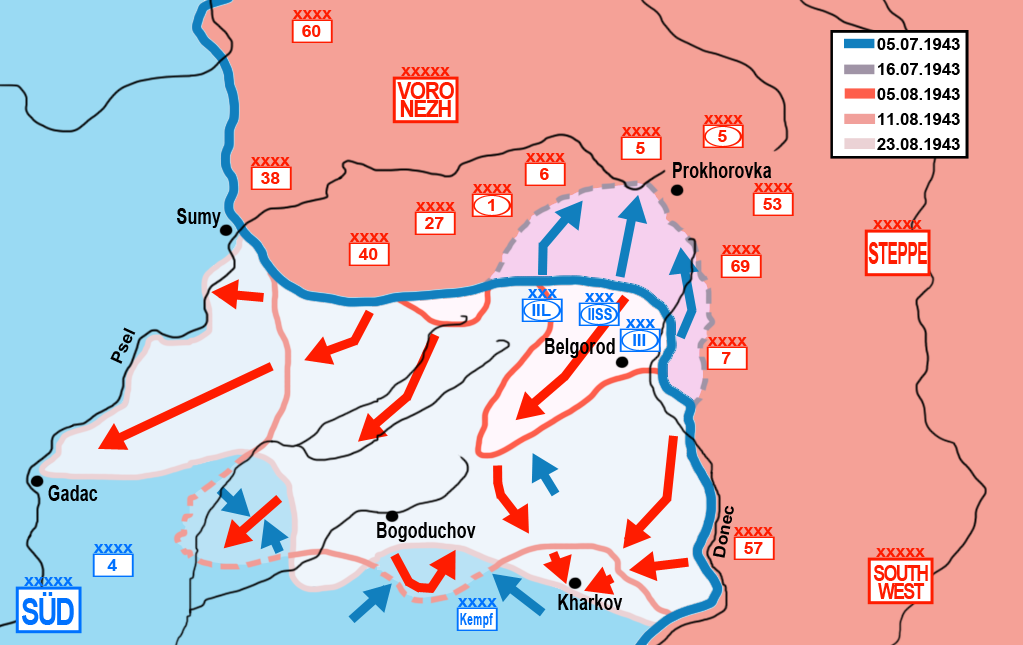
Operation Polkovodets Rumyantsev. Note position of 57th Army.

In the aftermath of the German defeat in the Battle of Kursk the 57th, as the northernmost army of Southwestern Front, was slated to attack across the Donets River into the flank of Army Group South east of Kharkiv. In July the 113th was assigned to the 64th Rifle Corps, joining the 41st Guards and 24th Rifle Divisions. On August 9 the Army joined the offensive east of Kharkiv against the XXXXII Army Corps of Army Detachment Kempf. Two days later it liberated Chuhuiv. Late on August 22 German forces began withdrawing from Kharkiv for the last time and it was entered by elements of the 57th and 69th Armies the next day. On the same day General Alyokhin was given command of the 27th Guards Rifle Corps, which he would lead until April 22, 1945, when he was mortally wounded. He was replaced on August 25 by Lt. Col. Mikhail Ivanovich Pogorelov until September 7, when Col. Pyotr Vasilevich Dmitriev took command. Before the end of August 57th Army was transferred to Steppe Front, and the 113th was moved to 68th Rifle Corps.

=== Battle of the Dniepr ===
Within days the division was again marching towards the Dniepr. On September 6 the Steppe Front was directed towards Kremenchuk and lead elements of 7th Guards Army forced a crossing southwest of that place on the night of September 25. Before the end of the month the 113th was transferred to that Army as a separate division. On October 7 the Front commander, Army Gen. I. S. Konev, submitted his plan to strike from the large bridgehead his forces had created between Kremenchuk and Zaporizhzhia towards Piatykhatky and Kryvyi Rih with five armies, including the 7th Guards and the 57th. By October 19 the former was taken, but an attempt by 5th Guards Tank Army to take the latter from the march was checked by the 11th Panzer Division. Some time after this the 113th returned to 57th Army, coming under the 27th Guards Rifle Corps. Steppe Front had been renamed 2nd Ukrainian Front on October 20.

=== Kirovograd and Nikopol-Krivoi Rog ===
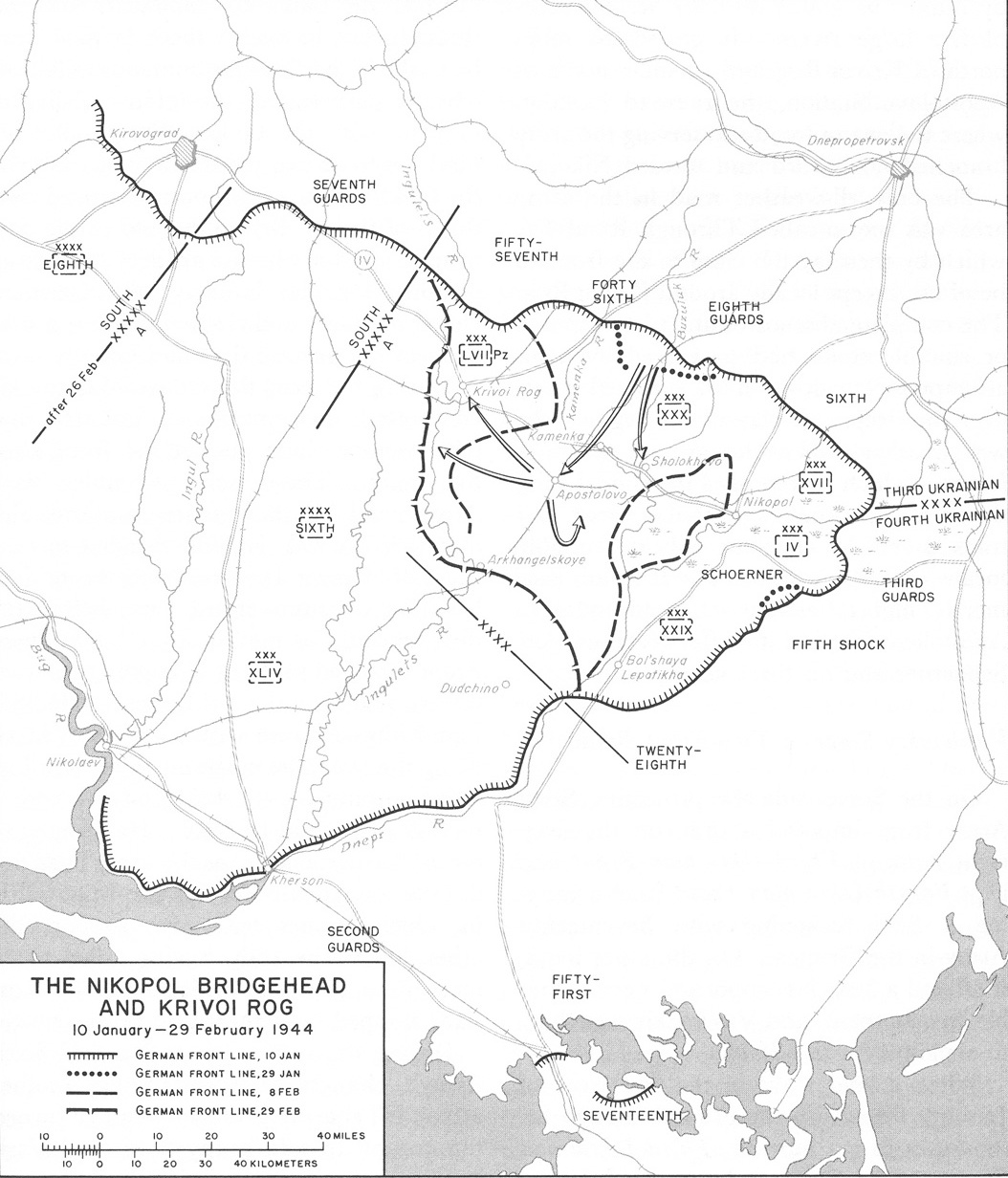
Nikopol–Krivoy Rog Offensive. Note position of 57th Army.

On November 13 the Front gained small bridgeheads on both sides of Cherkasy and quickly expanded the northern one until it threatened to engulf the city and tear open the front of the German 8th Army. Later that month the division was reassigned yet again, returning to 68th Corps, still in 57th Army Through most of December and into January 1944 the Front was generally engaged in attrition battles but on January 5 it threw a powerful blow at the boundary between 8th and 6th Armies with two shock groups, one of which contained the 57th Army. The assault penetrated nearly to Kirovograd in a matter of hours, and the next day swept north and south of the city, encircling the XXXXVII Panzer Corps. Army Group South intervened with two panzer divisions and on January 8 the XXXXVII Panzer gave up the city and pulled back to the west.

At the start of the Nikopol–Krivoi Rog offensive on January 30 the 57th Army was located north-northeast of Kryvyi Rih facing the LVII Panzer Corps but played a secondary role in this operation which lasted until the end of February. During its course the Army was transferred to 3rd Ukrainian Front, where it would remain for the duration.

=== Bereznegovatoye–Snigirevka and Odessa Offensives ===
On March 6 the Front began a new offensive against 6th Army which quickly scored a breakthrough which allowed the 4th Guards Mechanized Corps and 4th Guards Cavalry Corps to drive some 40km west to Novyi Buh. The 6th Army's staff found themselves again in the position of having a split front with Soviet forces roaming in the rear. By March 25, advancing through spring thaw conditions, the 113th began arriving along the Southern Buh River near the village of Vinogradny Sad in Mykolaiv Oblast. One of the first men across was Sen. Sgt. Konstantin Ivanovich Frolov of the reconnaissance platoon of the 1292nd Rifle Regiment. After reaching the west bank he destroyed a German firing point, then helped fight off counterattacks through that day and the next, when he suppressed another machine gun emplacement and took three prisoners. Severely wounded in this action, he soon died, and would be buried in a mass grave in Vinogradny Sad. Another man of this regiment, Krasnoarmeets Ilya Grigorevich Meshakov, was also part of this crossing operation and took part in repelling up to nine counterattacks, personally accounting for several German soldiers killed or wounded. He survived the war, marched in the 1945 Moscow Victory Parade, and worked as a teacher of Russian from 1954 until his sudden death in 1971 in his native Chuvashia at the age of 47. On June 3 both men, plus five others of the 1292nd, would be made Heroes of the Soviet Union for this action.

== Jassy-Kishinev Offensives ==
After forcing the Buh the Front began a new offensive in the southern sector of western Ukraine. While its left-wing armies struck in the direction of Odesa, the 57th, 37th and 46th Armies on its right wing advanced toward the Dniestr River and the border with Romania. At this time the 68th Corps, under command of Maj. Gen. N. N. Multan, contained the 113th with the 93rd and 223rd Rifle Divisions. By early on April 11 these armies were pursuing disorganized German forces on the approaches to the east bank of the Dniestr, intending to force the river between April 18–20. During the day the 57th Army covered about 18km with the 68th Corps deployed on the right wing, passing through Velykokomarivka toward Butor, 5km south of Tașlîc.

The Front commander, Army Gen. R. Ya. Malinovskii, had assigned 57th Army a 20km-wide sector of the Dniestr from Butor south to opposite Varnița. On this sector the river made a wide U-shaped bend to the west with Butor and Crasnogorca on either side of its entrance. German forces were defending this "bottleneck" as well as the west bank south of Crasnogorca. The terrain on the east bank was generally low, flat and free of obstacles; the west bank was similar north and south of the bend but then rose to about 125m height about 3km from the riverbank and much closer directly west of the bend in the vicinity of the village of Talița. 68th Corps arrived at the east bank at midday on April 12 and the 93rd immediately began crossing with improvised means near Butor after overcoming weak outposts of the German 320th Infantry Division. The remainder of that division got over through the next hours, taking up positions in a small but fairly secure bridgehead. Colonel Dmitriev's men now began crossing, helping to expand and strengthen the lodgement. The 223rd also reached the river south of Crasnogorka, but was unable to force a crossing.

Overnight the 73rd Guards Rifle Division of 64th Corps was able to take a small bridgehead north of Crasnogorka but came under intense German artillery, mortar and machine gun fire which prevented its main body from crossing. While this fighting raged the 52nd Rifle Division forced another crossing south of Gura Bîcului, and the main body of the 73rd Guards was redirected to this point, but it proved impossible to expand the bridgehead, again due to heavy fire, particularly from artillery on the heights to the west. The German defenses of the "bottleneck" were not overcome until April 16. The Army's 9th Rifle Corps to the south also failed to gain more than minor footholds over the Dniestr. By April 14 it was clear that Malinovskii's objectives would not be met and he ordered the Army to go over to the defense.

Meanwhile, the 5th Guards Army had seized a bridgehead near Tașlîc, and began a push to expand it on April 18. This failed, and Marshal Konev, still in command of 2nd Ukrainian Front, asked Malinovskii for reinforcements, including the 113th. The division was deployed in the southern third of the bridgehead to back up the 93rd in the Speia area. 68th Corps was to attack westward on the left flank of 5th Guards Army just after dawn on April 25, following a powerful artillery preparation. The reinforced shock group managed to advance up to 3km across its entire front and reached the base of Hill 169 before being forced to ground by heavy fire. The fighting continued until late on April 26 and expanded the size of the bridgehead by about one-third while forcing the 6th Army to commit four divisions to its containment. In early May 5th Guards left the bridgehead and moved north, being replaced by 8th Guards Army moving up from Odesa, but 68th Corps remained under 57th Army.

=== Second Jassy–Kishinev Offensive ===
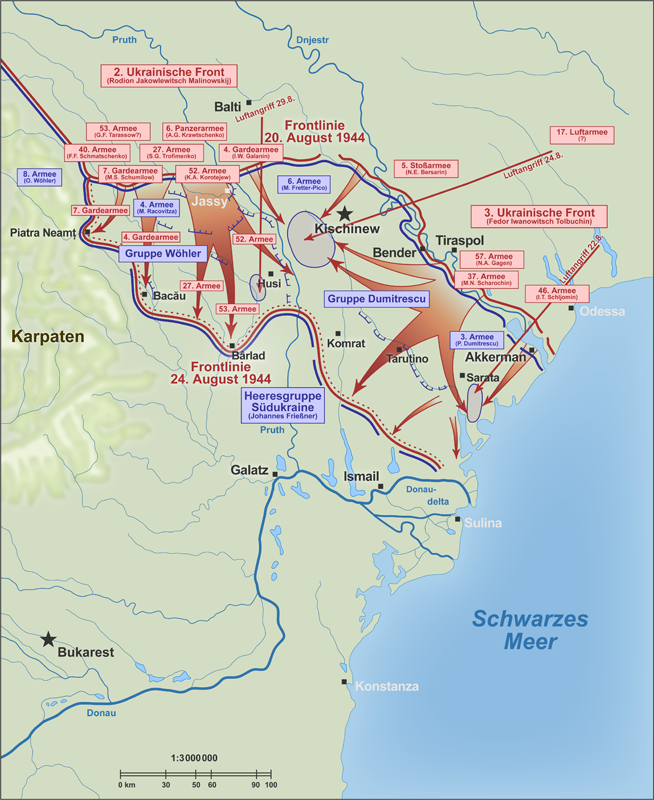
Second Jassy-Kishinev Offensive. Note starting position of 57th Army.

Over the next four months the 57th Army was shifted south, taking up positions north and south of Tiraspol. On June 17 Colonel Dmitriev left the division and was replaced by Col. Latyp Shafikovich Mukhamedyarov. In the planning for the offensive that was to drive Romania out of the Axis in August it was assigned a 14km-wide attack zone and a 4km sector for launching its main attack, facing elements of the German XXX Army Corps. The main attack sector was centered on the village of Chircăiești on the west bank and the Army was deployed with the 68th Corps, comprising the same divisions as in April, in first echelon. It was tasked to break through the German defense along a sector from the southern part of Hagimus to an unnamed lake 1000m north of Chircăiești, to develop the offensive toward the flanks, and by the end of the day capture the line Gîsca–Tănătari–Ursoaia–Kaushan station. Following this it was to launch an attack on Zolotyanka. The Corps was deployed with the 93rd near Hagimus and the 113th on the Chircăiești sector; following the breakthrough the 223rd would exploit in the direction of Tănătari. The 9th Corps would be committed on the second day and by the following day the two Corps were to reach the Balmaz area. 64th Corps was the Army's third echelon and reserve.

The offensive began on August 20 but 57th Army's and 68th Corps' initial progress was not as great as planned. By 1100 hours the 93rd and 113th had captured the first trench and the railroad bed between Hagimus and Lake Botno and had begun to very slowly develop the attack toward the flanks. The German 15th Infantry Division put up stubborn resistance, forcing the commitment of the 223rd in the center at 2000 hours, but it made insignificant progress. During the day the Corps had penetrated 3-4km into the depth of the German defense and widened the base of the wedge up to 8km, but had failed to carry out its assigned mission. On August 21 the 68th Corps was still being held up by the 15th Infantry and the left flank of the 257th Infantry Division. It attacked three times but each time encountered effective resistance both by fire and counterattacks and only began to advance at 1920 following an artillery and aviation preparation, gaining ground in the center and eventually reaching Kaushan station. During the following day the Corps repulsed up to 15 counterattacks and by evening the 223rd had seized the paved road from Bender to Kaushan station, while the 93rd took Hagimus and the 113th began fighting for Tănătari. Meanwhile the 9th Corps, backed by tanks and self-propelled artillery, was committed along the Ursoaia–Kaushan station sector and captured both strongpoints. On accordance with Stalin's Order No. 169 of that date the division was awarded the title "Lower Dniestr" as a battle honor for its role in defeating the German defenses south of Bender.

Overnight on August 22/23 the German Chișinău group of forces began to retreat toward the Prut River as individual detachments of 57th Army continued fighting through the night. As early as 0200 hours the 68th Corps seized Tănătari and by 0730 the Corps' forward detachment, consisting of elements of the 93rd and 223rd, captured the town and fortress of Bender; by this time the entire Army had gone over to the attack while still facing resistance from XXX Corps. Later in the day the main body of the 113th reached Skrofa. Over the following days the Army pushed forward to complete the encirclement of the Chișinău group in conjunction with the 2nd Ukrainian Front from the north. On August 25 the 223rd captured Kotovskoye at 1100 hours, which created a favorable situation to split the German forces that were sheltering in the forests south of that place and Molești. At 1500 the Army's forces began to carry out this plan. 68th Corps launched an attack in the direction of Sărata-Galbenă and captured Mereșeni, nearly completing the split. During the day the Army inflicted heavy casualties on the encircled remnants of seven German divisions. On August 26 German resistance was effectively collapsing as the Army pressed north to link up with 37th Army and the 4th Guards Mechanized Corps, and General Malinovskii delivered a surrender ultimatum to the trapped grouping. The next day it was effectively eliminated and 57th Army began pressing toward the Romanian border.

== Into the Balkans ==
After advancing through southern Romania in early September 57th Army crossed the Bulgarian border on September 8, the day that country declared war on Germany. The Army moved west, south of the Danube, linking to the mobilizing Bulgarian armies to its south, approaching the border of Yugoslavia by September 19 and crossing the river into the bend west of Turnu Severin on the 22nd. The German Army Group F sent the 1st Mountain Division to oppose this move but it could only impose a delay. On October 4 Soviet forces reached Pančevo on the north bank of the Danube 16km downstream from Belgrade and on October 8 the railroad running into the city from the south was cut. On the night of October 14 a combined force of Soviet troops and Yugoslav partisans entered Belgrade and took the city center by the next afternoon. On November 14 the 113th would be awarded the Order of the Red Banner for its role in the battle for the city. Later in October the division was detached from 68th Corps, coming under direct Army command.

At about this time the 3rd Ukrainian Front crossed the Sava River and by the end of the month reached the Ruma area, 60km northwest of Belgrade. By month's end the Front was covering a line over 300km long with just the 57th Army. The 113th was serving as part of the Army reserve, stationed at Đurinci, Vlaška, and Mladenovac. On November 9 Malinovskii sent orders to Lt. Gen. M. N. Sharokhin, the Army commander, to concentrate his forces in order to force a crossing of the Danube by November 18. As part of this concentration the division returned to 64th Rifle Corps, joining the 19th and the 73rd Guards. This Corps was to begin crossing with one division on November 15 in the areas of Felse Kertik and Mohács. For this purpose the 73rd Guards and 19th gathered north and south of Sombor by the end of November 9, while the 113th was on the march in the Sivac area.

== Hungarian Operations ==
The 73rd Guards got over in a swift dash on November 14 with the help of the Danube Flotilla, rapidly expanded its lodgement and dug in, holding off several counterattacks over the following days. On the following day the 113th had finished concentrating at Sombor. On November 19 the STAVKA ordered captured equipment be sent to 2nd Ukrainian Front in order to construct a bridge near Novi Sad by December 5. In the event, a 16-tonne bridge was in operation on November 20 and overnight the division, along with the Corps' artillery and engineer reinforcements were able to cross. Sharokhin's plan was to link up his bridgeheads at Batina and Apatin before striking to a depth of 55-60km in the direction of Pécs. 64th Corps would make the main attack on a front of 5.5km with considerable artillery support. The 113th would make a supporting attack through Zmaevac and Kneževi Vinogradi. The attack began at 1000 hours on November 19 after a 45-minute artillery preparation, but given flooded terrain, and the fact that the Army's regrouping had not been completed, this ended in failure.

After further regrouping the offensive was renewed and by the end of November 22 Axis resistance had collapsed, with the main body of the Corps capturing Gajic while the 113th had advanced along the crest of the heights toward Podolje, advancing 5km. During the next day the breakthrough was developed as the bridgeheads were linked up and another 8-10km were gained. Malinovskii now planned to feed the 4th Guards Army through the 57th's bridgehead. On November 24 elements of the 64th and 75th Rifle Corps advanced up to 4km, beginning to fight for Knezevi Vinogradi and Lug. By the end of the day the 64th Corps had reached a line from east of Udvar to Branina to east of Kamenac to north of Knezevi Vinogradi, with all three divisions in the first echelon.

At this point Malinovskii ordered his Front to advance northward to capture Nagykanizsa and Székesfehérvár with the goal of encircling the Axis' Budapest group of forces from the west. The forces in front of 57th Army withdrew under cover of strong rearguards, mined roads and other obstacles. 64th Corps was directed to bypass Szigetvár to cut the town off from the north. Overall during December 5–6 the Front advanced from 5km to 25km. During the following day Axis resistance increased significantly in face of the threat to the oil-production facilities around Nagykanizsa; 64th Corps managed to cover another 10km. On December 8 efforts by 57th and 4th Guards to take Székesfehérvár and break the "Margarita Line" from the march failed. The 73rd Guards and 19th Divisions repelled five counterattacks by up to a battalion each and were fighting along the eastern outskirts of Lábod. During this fighting the commander of the 19th, Maj. Gen. P. E. Lazarev, was killed by enemy artillery. On December 7 Colonel Mukhamedyarov left the 113th, being replaced by Maj. Gen. Aleksei Mitrofanovich Vlasenko until January 5, 1945, when he was relieved of command. Col. Pavel Nikolaevich Naidyshev took command the next day; this officer had previously served as deputy commander of the 57th Guards Rifle Division but had spent the previous 12 months as head of the Front's junior lieutenant training course.

At this point the Army was facing the Hungarian Szent László Infantry Division and 3rd Cavalry Brigade, as well as the German Brandenburg Division and 13th SS Mountain Division Handschar. The Corps made minor advances over the next two weeks while the 46th and 4th Guards Armies prepared for a new drive on December 20 to penetrate the "Margarita Line" and continue the advance on Budapest. 57th Army was ordered to remain on the defensive in order to cover the flank of this drive. The 113th once again took up an Army reserve role in and near Szamajom, along with the 32nd Mechanized Brigade. At about this time the 113th was reassigned to the 6th Guards Rifle Corps, still in 57th Army, joining the 20th and 61st Guards Rifle Divisions and the 19th Division.

=== Siege of Budapest ===
Budapest was surrounded by December 26 and on January 1 Army Group South began relief operations which continued for most of the month. In order to cover the flank of 46th Army the 113th concentrated by January 16 in the area of Erd–Tolnok Station. The most crucial attack came on January 20 when the 3rd SS Panzer Division Totenkopf and 5th SS Panzer Division Wiking regrouped and then carried out a nighttime reconnaissance-in-force between the Danube and Lake Velence. This was followed at 0500 hours on January 21 by an assault that focused on the positions held by the 5th Guards Cavalry Corps, but a secondary thrust by up to a battalion of infantry backed by 17 tanks struck the 61st Guards in the direction of the Sárvíz River with the aim of tying down the 57th Army and preventing it being shifted to the Budapest axis. The attack broke into the division's first line of trenches but made little further progress due to strong antitank defenses. Later that day Malinovskii, in an effort to reinforce the left flank of 4th Guards Army, transferred the 113th to that command, which in turn placed it in second echelon behind 5th Guards Cavalry, taking up an antitank line along the Vali River which covered the main hard-surfaced road to Budapest.

During January 21 the division continued to prepare a defense along the line Kis–Ranszentpeter–Simon–Marker 125. By now it was clear that the main German objective was Székesfehérvár. The counteroffensive resumed at 0530 hours on January 22 with a total of four panzer divisions. 5th Guards Cavalry again came under attack and the defense of 12th Guards Cavalry Division was broken through, although this came at the cost of 70 tanks knocked out. The next day the IV SS Panzer Corps was to complete this breakthrough, widen the breach and drive through to Budapest, but this was stymied in large part by the 113th and 252nd Rifle Divisions, which made use of every sort of antitank weapon available. By now IV SS Corps had only enough fuel for one more day of operations. During that day it gained only 1-2.5km into the positions of the 252nd. Overnight on January 25/26 a fresh effort was made to advance from the northwest along the Vali. Heavy fighting took place in the Pettend–Baracska area that again involved the 252nd, creating a penetration up to 10km deep with heavy armor.

By now 4th Guards Army was in a difficult position and was reinforced with the 23rd Tank Corps, which moved toward Vereb. In addition, the 113th was moved to the 104th Rifle Corps, and these two Corps were to be ready to launch a counterstrike toward Martonvásár and Sárosd on the morning of January 28, with the intention of cutting off and destroying this penetration. While this did not completely succeed the panzers were forced over to the defense and the breakthrough sector was narrowed. Meanwhile, 104th Corps made gains toward Sárosd with the help of heavy air attacks. This marked the effective end of Operation Konrad III, the last effort to relieve Budapest. On the morning of January 30 the counteroffensive was renewed by 23rd Tanks and 104th Corps, largely in the area of Aggszentpeter. Elements of Totenkopf were encircled and destroyed and 23rd Tanks advanced up to 6km while the 113th and 66th Guards Rifle Division followed up the armor to widen the gap to 8km. Budapest fell on February 13. By the beginning of March the division had returned to 57th Army, now in 64th Corps.

== Operation Spring Awakening ==
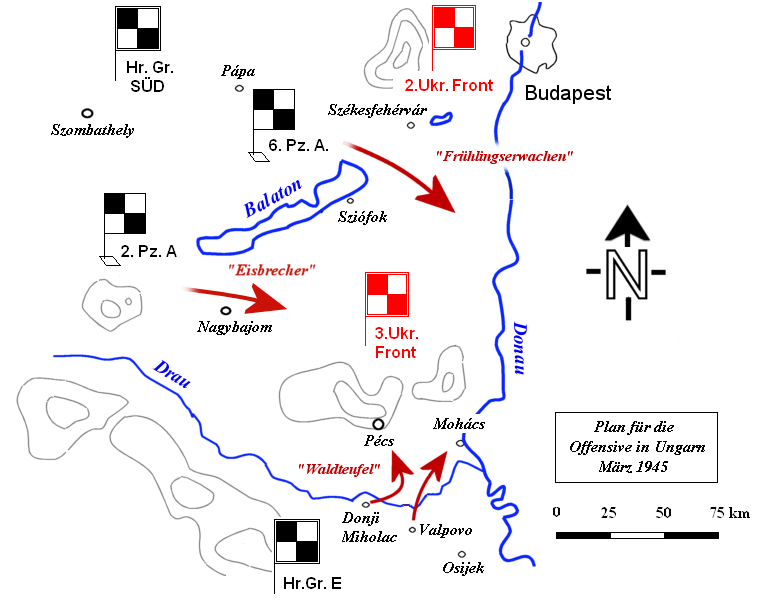
Operation Spring Awakening and associated operations

Following the failure of the Ardennes Offensive the 6th Panzer Army was shipped to Hungary. Hitler was determined to gain a prestige victory with his last uncommitted reserve, and the STAVKA decided to let him have the next move. At this time the 57th Army was south of Lake Balaton and the offensive, which Hitler justified as necessary to defend the last Hungarian oil fields, would unfold on either side of it. Frühlingserwachen began at midnight on March 5 when Army Group F seized bridgeheads over the Drava River. I SS Panzer Corps was ready at dawn to move west of the Sarviz Canal, but II SS Panzer Corps on the east side was 24 hours late. 3rd Ukrainian Front was well aware of the German buildup, which had taken more than a month. The offensive made poor progress, due to the spring thaw and stiff Soviet resistance. Maj. Galaktion Eliseevich Alpaidze was in command of the 972nd Artillery Regiment, which accounted for 10 tanks and 23 firing points destroyed plus six German artillery batteries suppressed by counter-battery fire. He was wounded three times on March 11, including a concussion, but continued to direct the fire of his battalions. In recognition, on April 28 he was made a Hero of the Soviet Union. He continued in the Soviet Army postwar, furthering his military education and moving in 1962 to the missile and space establishment, serving as the first commander of the Plesetsk Cosmodrome and leading the Plesetsk State Research Test Range from 1963 until his retirement in 1975 with the rank of lieutenant general. He died on May 2, 2006 and was buried in Moscow.

3rd Ukrainian Front went over to the counteroffensive on March 16, retaking Székesfehérvár overnight on March 21/22. Beginning on March 26 the 57th Army made the main offensive drive in the Nagykanizsa–Körmend Offensive. At the end of the month the 113th was engaged in heavy fighting with elements of the 2nd Panzer Army near Nagybajom. Following a short, powerful artillery preparation at 0150 hours on March 29 the division began an attack on fortified positions which were penetrated by 0400, driving the defenders back in hand-to-hand fighting. The survivors withdrew to reserve positions and a day-long exchange of artillery, mortar, and machine gun fire followed, during which Colonel Naidyshev was killed. He was posthumously promoted to major general on April 19. Maj. Gen. Vasilii Arkadevich Kindyukhin, former commander of the 78th and 180th Rifle Divisions and currently serving as the chief of the Front's combat training section, took over on March 30 and led the 113th into the postwar.

In recognition of their successes in the fighting around Nagykanizsa during this offensive, on April 26 the 972nd Artillery Regiment would be awarded the Order of Bogdan Khmelnitsky, 2nd Degree, while the 1292nd Rifle Regiment received the Order of Kutuzov, 3rd Degree. The division ended the war advancing into western Austria.

== Postwar ==
With the coming of peace the men and women of the division shared the full title of 113th Rifle, Lower Dniestr, Order of the Red Banner Division. (Russian: 113-я стрелковая Нижнеднестровская Краснознамённая дивизия.) Under the terms of the decree that created the Southern Group of Forces from 3rd Ukrainian Front on June 15 the 113th is listed as one of the divisions to be "disbanded in place". It was accordingly disbanded in July.
