= Villa Sellgren =

House and estate on Lodochny Island, Russia

Coordinates: 60°39′49″N 28°40′54″E

Villa Sellgren before renovation.

Villa Sellgren is a dacha and estate on Lodochny Island in the Gulf of Finland of the Baltic Sea. It was designed by the Finnish architect Uno Ullberg and completed in 1913. The house was a location used in the shooting of a Russian version of Arthur Conan Doyle's His Last Bow in 1986. It was part of national forest reserves until 2012 when it was rezoned to allow construction. According to a Russian opposition leader Alexei Navalny, the house is owned by Vladimir Putin through friends.
