= Lodochnyy Island =

Peninsula and former island in Russia

Coordinates: 60.6628°N 28.6830°E

Lodochnyy Island (Russian: Остров Лодочный, romanized: Ostrov Lodochnyy) is a peninsula, and former island in Vyborgsky District, Leningrad Oblast, Russia. It lies within Vyborg Bay, which is located near the eastern end of Gulf of Finland in the Baltic Sea.

It is the site of the Villa Sellgren, which according to Russian opposition leader Alexei Navalny, is owned by Vladimir Putin through friends.
