= Nikolay Shkodunovich =

Soviet Army lieutenant general

Nikolay Nikolayevich Shkodunovich
- Born: 24 April 1900; Tver, Russian Empire
- Died: 19 October 1964 (aged 64) Belgrade, Yugoslavia
- Allegiance: Russian SFSR; Soviet Union
- Branch: Red Army (later Soviet Army)
- Service years: 1919–1964
- Rank: Lieutenant general
- Commands: 58th Rifle Division; 223rd Rifle Division; 68th Rifle Corps
- Conflicts: Russian Civil War; World War II
- Awards: Order of Lenin (2)

Nikolay Nikolayevich Shkodunovich (Russian: Николай Николаевич Шкодунович; 24 April 1900 – 19 October 1964) was a Soviet Army lieutenant general who held corps and division command during World War II.

Shkodunovich became a military commissar during the Russian Civil War and served in the Volga Military District and the Soviet Far East during the interwar period. He rose to division chief of staff before being arrested during Great Purge. Released after more than a year of imprisonment, he was reinstated in the army. Holding a staff position at a military school when Operation Barbarossa began, Shkodunovich commanded a replacement unit before commanding the 58th and 223rd Rifle Divisions. In mid-1943 he rose to command the 68th Rifle Corps, which he commanded for the rest of the war in the Red Army's advance westward through Ukraine, Romania, Yugoslavia, Hungary and Austria before ending the war in Czechoslovakia. Postwar, Shkodunovich was posted to the Higher Military Academy and the Frunze Military Academy as a faculty member. He was among several senior officers killed in a 1964 air crash in Belgrade.

== Early life and Russian Civil War ==
A Russian, Nikolay Nikolayevich Shkodunovich was born on 24 April 1900 in the city of Tver. Before serving in the army, he worked as an accounts clerk at the Rozhdestvenskaya textile mill.

During the Russian Civil War, he joined the Red Army as a volunteer on 7 May 1919 and was enlisted as a Red Army man in the 1st Moscow Special Purpose Food Requisitioning Regiment, and from there in June sent to the 12th Saratov Food Requisitioning Regiment, in the process of formation. In late 1919, the regiment was reorganized as a separate battalion, and Shkodunovich transferred to the 111th Separate Rifle Battalion of the Internal Security Troops. Here he served as chairman of the cultural committee and secretary of the military commissar.

The battalion was relocated to the Western Front in October 1920 and reorganized as the 155th Regiment of the Internal Service Troops (VNUS), part of the 18th Division of the VNUS, and Shkodunovich appointed assistant regimental military commissar. From November he served as military commissar of the headquarters of the 53rd Brigade of this division in Vitebsk. After the disbandment of the division in February 1921, Shkodunovich was sent to the Volga Military District, where he served in the 26th Rifle Division of the VNUS as military commissar of the headquarters of the 77th Brigade. With this unit he fought in actions against the forces of Bakulin and Popov in the Transvolga region. In May 1921 he was appointed military commissar of the headquarters of the 50th Rifle Division. After its disbandment in August 1921, he became an instructor of the political department of the 126th and then the 97th Separate Rifle Brigades of the district.

== Interwar period ==
In February 1922, Shkodunovich was appointed assistant military commissar of the 5th Ural Rifle Regiment of the 2nd Separate Brigade in the Volga Military District. After its disbandment in August he became military commissar of the motor vehicle detachment of the 32nd Rifle Division of the district. Shkodunovich rose to assistant military commissar of the 94th Frunze Red Banner Rifle Regiment of the 32nd in October 1923 before becoming regimental military commissar. Sent to the Vystrel course for advanced training in November 1926, he returned to the 32nd Division after graduation and served with the 95th Volga Rifle Regiment as a battalion commander, acting regimental commander, and regimental chief of staff. In October 1930 he was appointed commander of a cadet battalion at the Ulyanovsk Lenin Red Banner Infantry School and then sent to the KUVNAS course in Moscow. After graduating in January 1931, he became commander and commissar of the 91st Astrakhan Rifle Regiment of the 31st Rifle Division of the Volga Military District in April.

In April 1932 Shkodunovich was sent to the Soviet Far East to serve as commander and commissar of the 3rd Kolkhoz Rifle Regiment of the 1st Kolkhoz Rifle Division of the Special Red Banner Far Eastern Army. He was awarded the Order of the Red Star on 17 August 1936. From January 1937 he served as chief of staff of the 39th Pacific Rifle Division. During the Great Purge, then-Colonel Shkodunovich was arrested by the NKVD in July 1938. He was imprisoned until the 1st Red Banner Army military tribunal acquitted and released him in October 1939. Reinstated in the army, Shkodunovich was appointed assistant chief for training and personnel of the Kuybyshev Infantry School in January 1940. He became deputy chief of the school in December of that year.

== World War II ==
After Operation Barbarossa began, Shkodunovich was appointed commander of the 20th Reserve Rifle Brigade, a replacement training unit of the Volga Military District, in July 1941. In December of that year he took command of the district's 58th Rifle Division, forming at Melekess. In early April 1942 the division arrived on the Western Front, where it attacked in the Mosalsk sector as part of the 50th Army. From May the division defended positions in Baryatinsky District of the Smolensk Oblast. Sent to complete an accelerated course at the Higher Military Academy in November, upon graduation in May 1943 Shkodunovich was appointed commander of the 223rd Rifle Division in the Reserve of the Supreme High Command. From June the division was part of the 46th Army of the Southwestern Front.

Shkodunovich took command of the newly formed 68th Rifle Corps, which included the 223rd, on 30 July 1943, which he led for the rest of the war. The corps later became part of the 57th, 37th, 4th Guards, and 46th Armies of the Southwestern, Steppe, 2nd, and 3rd Ukrainian Fronts, fighting in the Belgorod–Kharkov offensive operation and the Battle of the Dnieper. In August, as part of the 57th Army, the corps forced a crossing of the Seversky Donets and participated in the liberation of Kharkov. Shkodunovich was promoted to major general on 1 September 1943. Subsequently, continuing to pursue the retreating German troops, the corps reached the Dnieper, forced a crossing of the river and captured a bridgehead north of Dniprodzerzhinsk. Under Shkodunovich's command, the corps fought in the Bereznegovatoye–Snigirevka offensive, the Odessa Offensive, the Second Jassy–Kishinev offensive, the Belgrade offensive, the Budapest offensive, the Vienna offensive, and the Prague offensive. The corps participated in the capture of Bobrynets, Bender, Győr, Komárom, Magyarovar, Budapest, Hollabrunn, and Vienna. For his "skillful organization" of the corps Shkodunovich received the Order of Lenin, Order of the Red Banner, Order of Kutuzov 1st class, Order of Suvorov 2nd class, and Order of Bogdan Khmelnitsky 2nd class.

== Postwar ==
After the end of the war, Shkodunovich continued to command the corps in the Southern Group of Forces. Appointed a senior instructor at the Higher Military Academy in January 1946, he promoted to lieutenant general in 1949. Shkodunovich was transferred to the Frunze Military Academy in September 1952, where he served as deputy chief of the academy for operational and tactical training, then from November 1955 served there as deputy chief for scientific research work (from September 1961 this position was deputy chief for scientific and training work). Shkodunovich was awarded the title of docent for the higher unit tactics faculty on 5 August 1953 and on 15 September 1961 was awarded the Order of the Red Banner of Labour for "merits in training of specialists and in the development of military science." Shkodunovich died in a plane crash in Belgrade, Yugoslavia on 19 October 1964 along with several other Soviet generals visiting for the twentieth anniversary of the liberation of the country during the war.

== Awards and honors ==
Shkodunovich received the following decorations:

- Order of Lenin (2)
- Order of the Red Banner (3)
- Order of Kutuzov, 1st class
- Order of Suvorov, 2nd class
- Order of Bogdan Khmelnitsky, 2nd class
- Order of the Red Banner of Labour
- Order of the Red Star
- Medals

A Soviet tanker was named General Shkodunovich in his honor.
