= 58th Rifle Division =

58th Rifle Division 58th Mountain Rifle Division
- Active: 1931 – 1941
- Country: Soviet Union
- Branch: Red Army
- Type: Infantry and Mountain Infantry
- Size: Division

The 58th Rifle Division was an infantry division of the Red Army formed during the interwar period. Its second formation during World War II gained the Oder honorific.

== History ==
The 58th Rifle Division was formed in 1931 at Cherkasy. Its first recorded commander and commissar was Vasily Polyakov, who took the position in April 1932. Polyakov transferred to command the 96th Rifle Division in December 1933, and was replaced by assistant division commander Grigory Kaptsevich (who received the rank of kombrig in 1935 when the Red Army introduced personal ranks). During the 1935 Kiev Military District maneuvers, the division took on the role of an airborne division as a demonstration as the Red Army did not yet include airborne divisions. Kaptsevich was arrested during the Great Purge on 13 August 1937 and ultimately executed.

The division was headquartered at Cherkasy as part of the Kiev Military District. It participated in 1940 in the Soviet occupation of Bessarabia and northern Bukovina. After that, it remained at peacetime strength until January 1941 when it was re-formed as the 58th Mountain Rifle Division.

The 58th Mountain Rifle Division was surrounded and destroyed along with other parts of the 6th and 12th armies. Its commander, Major General Nikolay Proshkin, was captured and died in January 1942 in a prisoner of war camp, Commissar M. Pozhidaev disappeared without a trace. The division was disbanded on September 19, 1941.

== Organization on Formation ==
The division was first formed in 1932 as the 58th Rifle Division. In Cherkasy the division had the following structure:

- 170th Rifle Regiment
- 279th Rifle Regiment
- 335th Rifle Regiment
- 244th Artillery Regiment
- 138th Howitzer Regiment

== Organization on Disbandment ==
Organization of the division before it was destroyed during the Uman pocket:

- Headquarters
  - 170th Rifle Regiment
  - 279th Rifle Regiment
  - 335th Rifle Regiment
  - 368th Rifle Regiment
  - 244th Artillery Regiment
  - 258th Howitzer Regiment
  - 138th Anti-Tank Battalion
  - 125th Anti-Aircraft Battalion
  - 81st Reconnaissance Battalion
  - 126th Engineer Battalion
  - 100th Signal Battalion
  - 114th Medical Battalion
  - 132nd Supply Battalion
  - 105th Chemical Defense Company
- Also Attached
  - 59th Field Bakery
  - 258th Field Post Station
  - 353rd Field Ticket Officer of the State Bank

== Commanders ==
The division had a number of divisional commanders, including:

- Major General Nikolay Ignatevich Proshkin
- Colonel Nikolay Nikolayevich Shkodunovich
- Major General Vasiliy Akimovich Samsonov
