= Lokhaniemi =

Peninsula near Vyborg Bay, Russia

Coordinates: 60.6442°N 28.6770°E

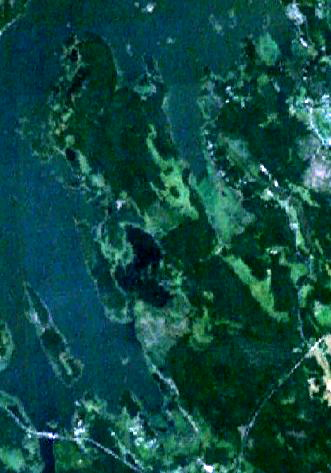
Лоханиеми

Lokhaniemi (Russian: Лоханиеми; Finnish: Lihaniemi) is a peninsula along the eastern shore of Vyborg Bay (in the Gulf of Finland of the Baltic Sea), at its narrowest point, between Tikhaya Bay and Medyanskaya Bay.
