= Jaroměřice =

- Municipality
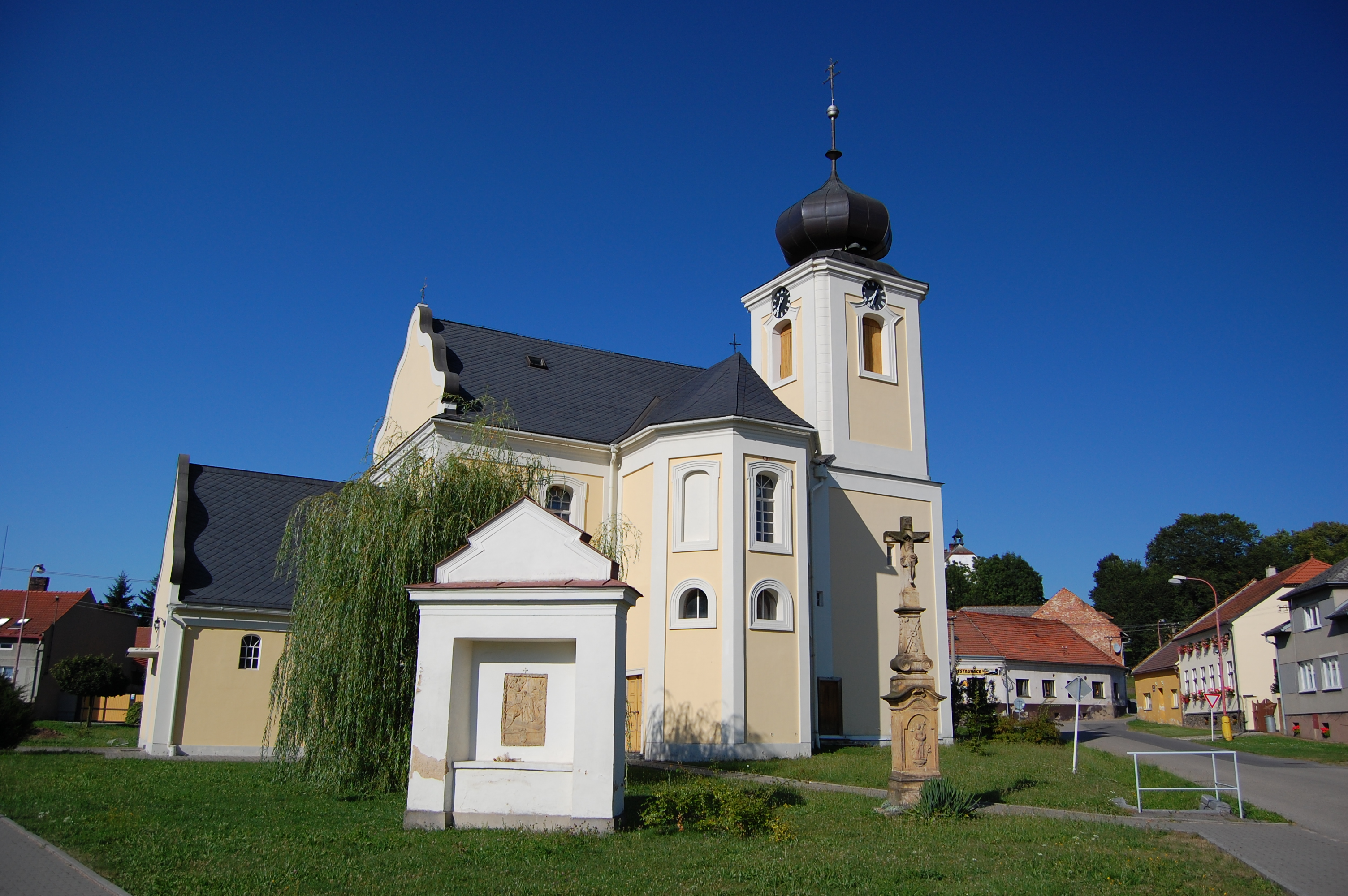
- Church of All Saints

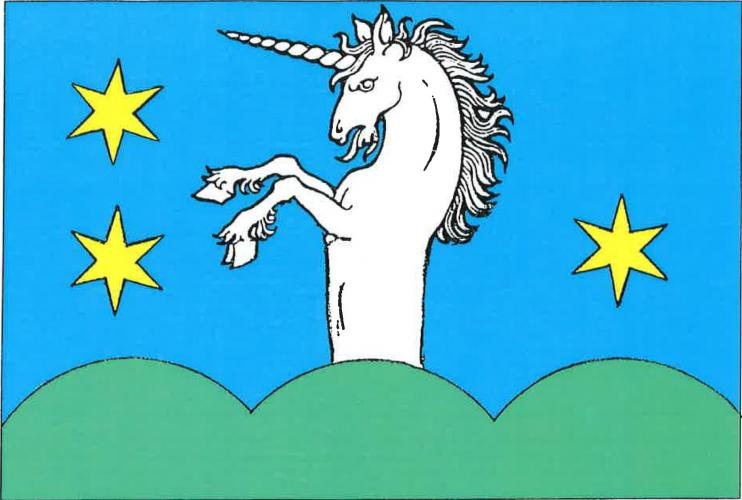
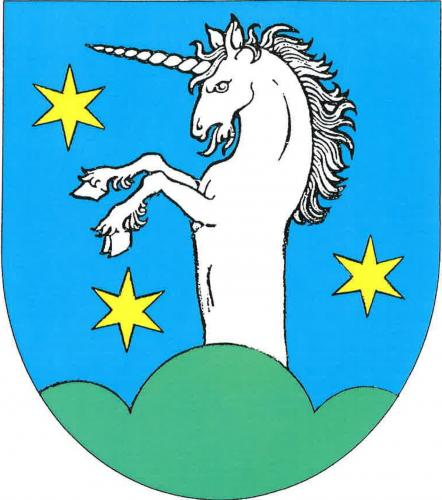
- Flag Coat of arms

- Location in the Czech Republic
- Coordinates: 49°37′32″N 16°45′7″E
- Country: Czech Republic
- Region: Pardubice
- District: Svitavy
- Founded: 1080s

Area
  - Total: 22.06 km^{2} (8.52 sq mi)
- Elevation: 368 m (1,207 ft)

Population (2026-01-01)
  - Total: 1,177
  - Density: 53.35/km^{2} (138.2/sq mi)
- Time zone: UTC+1 (CET)
  - Summer (DST): UTC+2 (CEST)
- Postal codes: 569 43, 569 44
- Website: www.jaromerice.cz

Jaroměřice is a municipality and village in Svitavy District in the Pardubice Region of the Czech Republic. It has about 1,200 inhabitants.

Jaroměřice lies approximately 26 kilometres (16 mi) south-east of Svitavy, 85 km (53 mi) south-east of Pardubice, and 176 km (109 mi) east of Prague.

== Administrative division ==
Jaroměřice consists of two municipal parts (in brackets population according to the 2021 census):

- Jaroměřice (1,113)
- Nový Dvůr (44)

== Demographics ==
Historical population
Year	Pop.	±%
1869	1,911	—
1880	1,875	−1.9%
1890	1,851	−1.3%
1900	1,944	+5.0%
1910	2,026	+4.2%
1921	1,974	−2.6%
1930	1,955	−1.0%
1950	1,472	−24.7%
1961	1,568	+6.5%
1970	1,418	−9.6%
1980	1,316	−7.2%
1991	1,311	−0.4%
2001	1,267	−3.4%
2011	1,197	−5.5%
2021	1,157	−3.3%
Source: Censuses

== Gallery ==
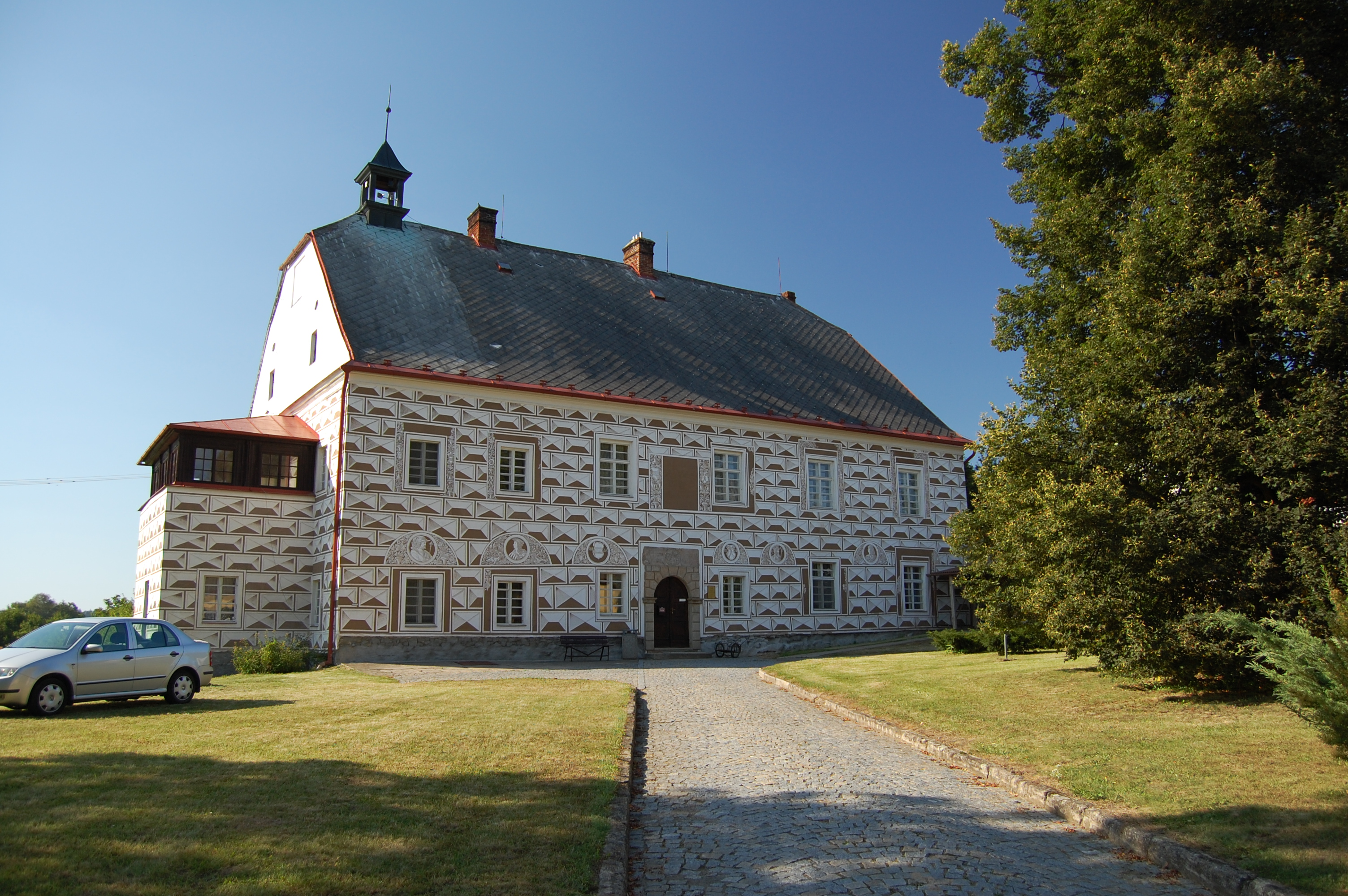
Jaroměřice Castle

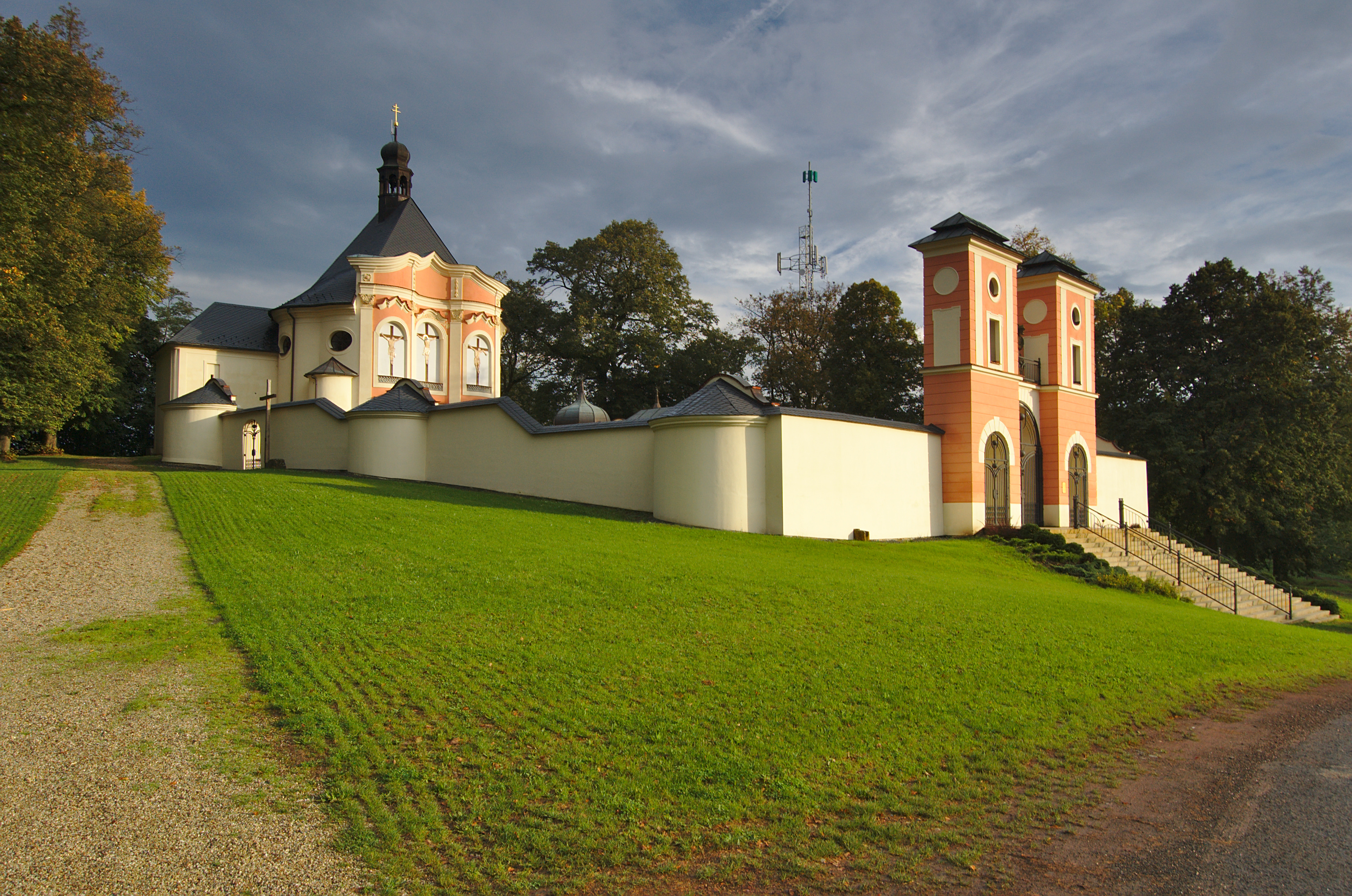
Church of the Exaltation of the Holy Cross on the Calvary
