= Vitkovac (Kraljevo) =

Coordinates: 43°47′N 20°47′E

Vitkovac Витковац (Serbian)
- Village (Selo)
- Interactive map of Vitkovac
- Country: Serbia
- District: Raška District
- Municipality: Kraljevo
- Time zone: UTC+1 (CET)
  - Summer (DST): UTC+2 (CEST)

Vitkovac is a village situated in Kraljevo municipality in Serbia.
