= Vyborg Bay =

Bay in the Gulf of Finland

Coordinates: 60°35′N 28°31′E

Vyborg Bay (Gulf of Finland)
Vyborg Bay (Baltic Sea)

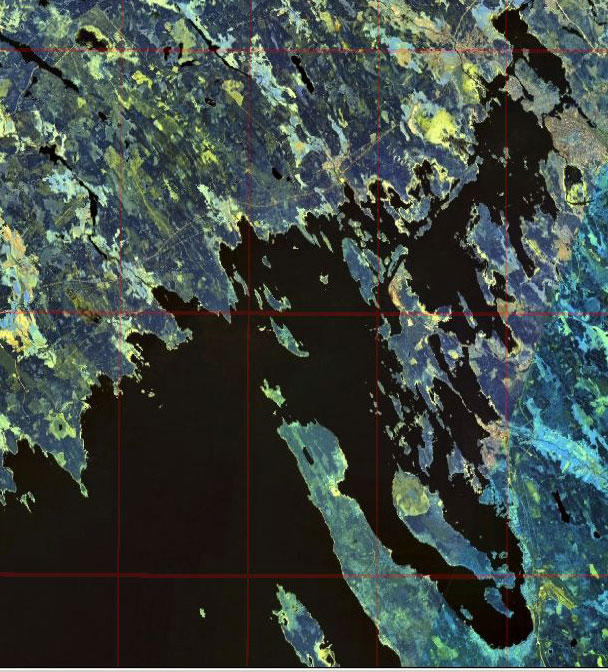
Gulf of Finland. Eastern shore of the Bay of Vyborg

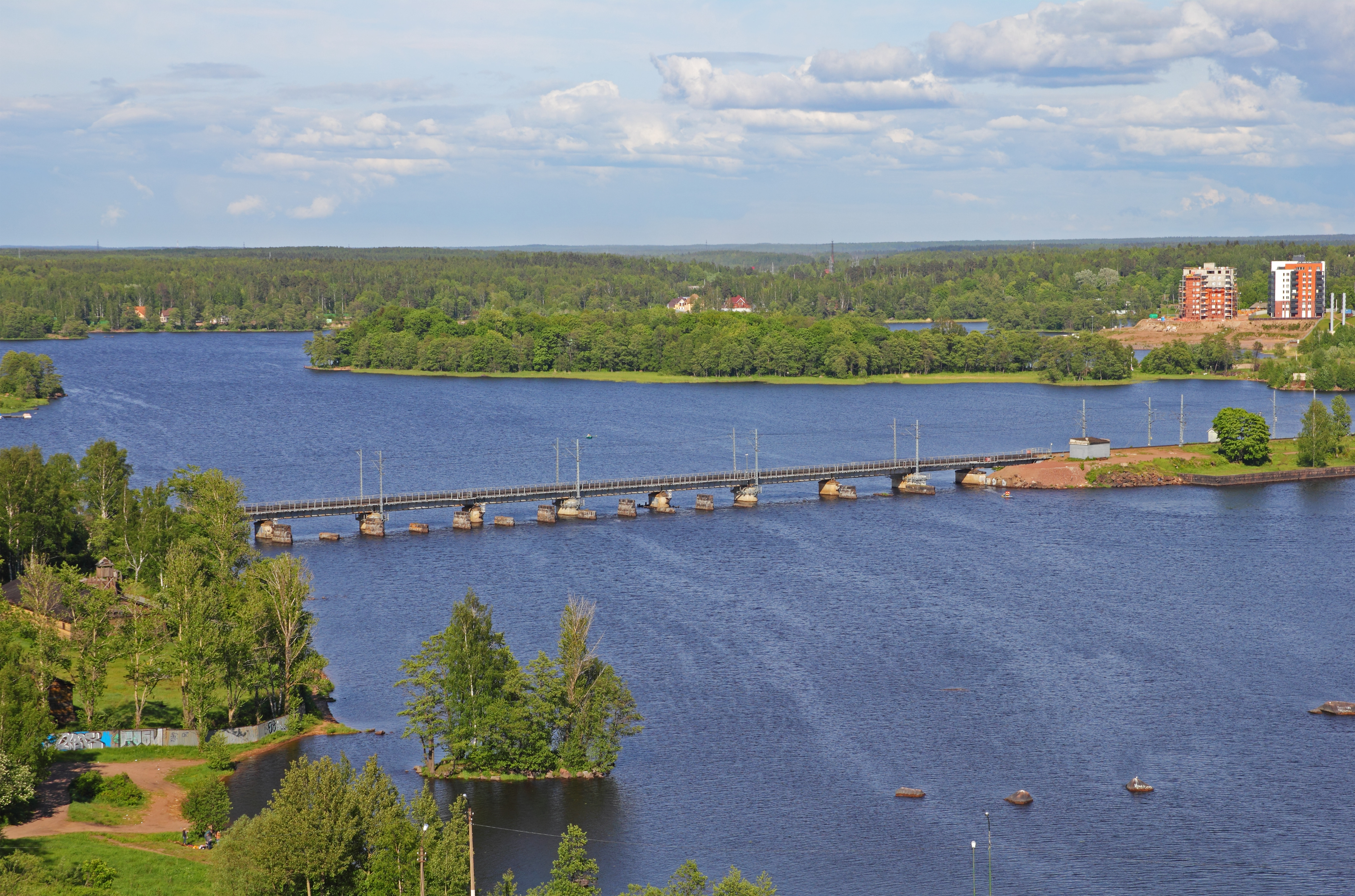
View of the Northern harbor of the Vyborg Bay

Vyborg Bay (Russian: Выборгский залив; Finnish: Viipurinlahti; Swedish: Viborgska viken) is a deep inlet running northeastward near the eastern end of the Gulf of Finland in the Baltic Sea. The Russian city of Vyborg is located near the head of the gulf.

Since the mid-19th century, the bay has been connected by the Saimaa Canal to the lake Saimaa in Finland.

In 1790, the bay was the scene of one of the largest naval battles in history, the Battle of Vyborg Bay, with a total of 498 Russian and Swedish ships.

The end of the bay is called Zashchitnaya Bay (Russian: бухта Защитная, Finnish: Suomenvedenpohja.) In the Middle Ages, the river Vuoksi had an outlet there, which dried up little by little due to post-glacial rebound and was left completely dry in 1857 when the Kiviniemi rapids in Losevo (Russian: Лосево, Finnish: Kiviniemi), Karelian isthmus were formed and the Burnaya River became the main outlet of Vuoksa.

Lodochnyy Island lies in the middle of the bay, between Vyborg and Vysotsk.

== See also ==
- Lokhaniemi
- Gulf of Finland
- Finland
- Russia
