= Mereșeni =

- Commune
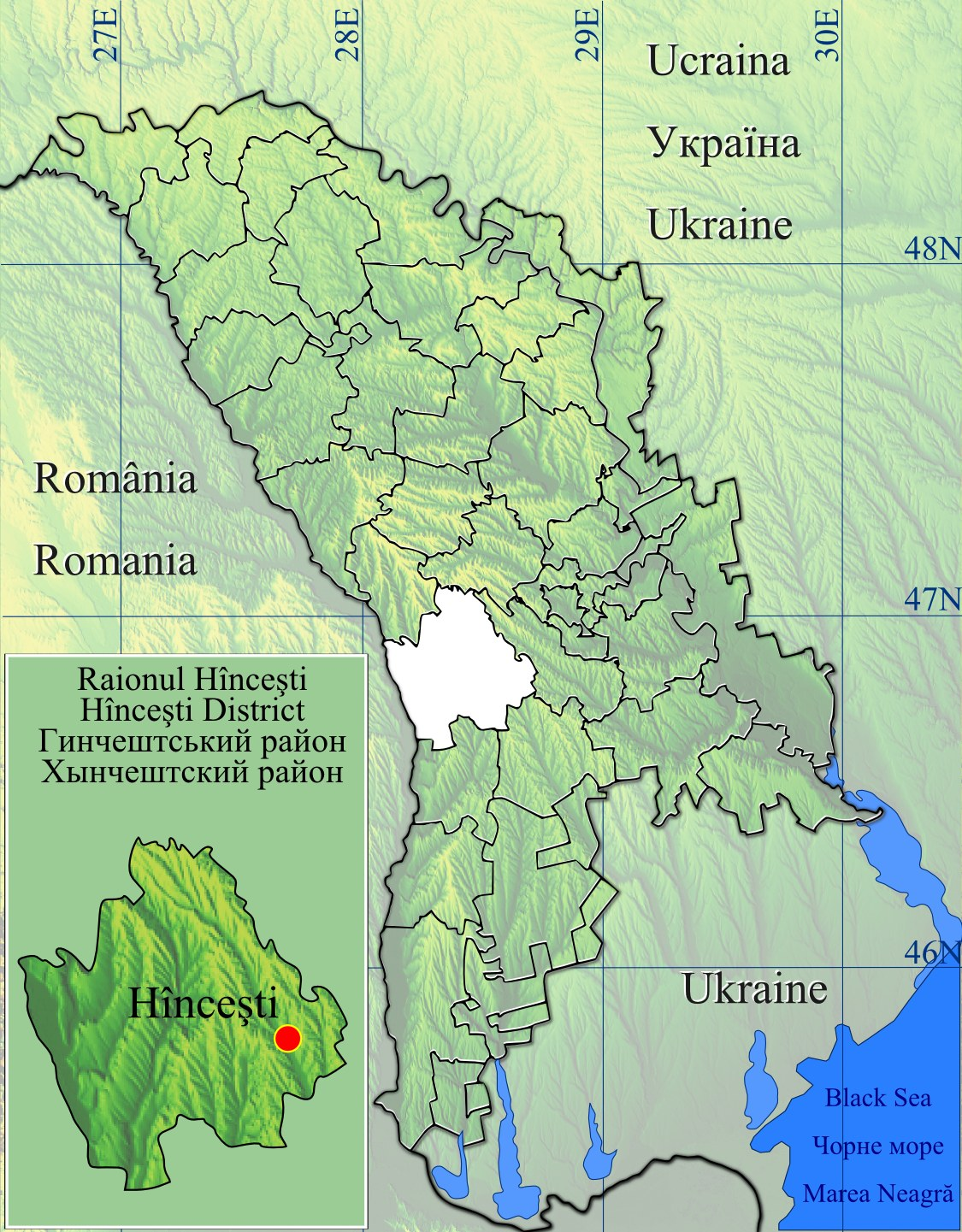
- Location within Hîncești
- Coordinates: 46°47′51″N 28°32′25″E
- Country: Moldova
- District: Hîncești District

Population (2014)
  - Total: 2,454
- Time zone: UTC+2 (EET)
  - Summer (DST): UTC+3 (EEST)
- Postal code: MD-3435

Mereșeni is a commune in Hînceşti District, Moldova. It is composed of two villages, Mereșeni and Sărata-Mereșeni.
