= 109th Guards Rifle Division =

- Active: 1943–1960
- Country: Soviet Union
- Branch: Red Army (1943–46); Soviet Army (1946–60)
- Type: Division
- Role: Infantry
- Engagements: Kuban Bridgehead; Nikopol–Krivoi Rog offensive Uman–Botoșani offensive Odessa Offensive; First Jassy–Kishinev Offensive; Second Jassy–Kishinev Offensive; Belgrade offensive Budapest Offensive; Siege of Budapest; Operation Spring Awakening; Vienna Offensive; Soviet invasion of Manchuria
- Decorations: Order of the Red Banner; Order of Suvorov
- Battle honours: Beryslav; Khingan

Commanders
- Notable commanders: Maj. Gen. Ilya Vasilevich Baldynov

The 109th Guards Rifle Division was formed as an elite infantry division of the Red Army in July 1943, based on the 6th Guards Rifle Brigade and the 9th Guards Rifle Brigade and was the second of a small series of Guards divisions formed on a similar basis. It was considered a "sister" to the 108th Guards Rifle Division and they fought along much the same combat paths until the spring of 1945.

Following a further abortive offensive against the German Gotenkopfstellung on the Taman Peninsula that month the division was moved into reserve and then sent northwest to join the 44th Army in Southern Front. During the advance to the Dniepr River in early November that Army was disbanded and the division, along with its 10th Guards Rifle Corps, was reassigned to 28th Army. Under this command the 109th Guards fought along the southern flank of the German bridgehead over the Dniepr River based at Nikopol until it was finally evacuated in early February 1944. Following this the 109th Guards advanced through western Ukraine, winning a battle honor at Beryslav and decorations for its part in the battles for Nikolaev and Odessa. Its advance was brought to a halt along the Dniestr River in early May. When a new offensive began in August the 10th Guards Corps was initially in reserve but soon forced a crossing of the Prut River which began an advance through southern Romania. In late October the 109th Guards took part in the liberation of Belgrade, for which all four of its regiments were decorated or received battle honors. Following this the division pushed northward and participated in the encirclement and the siege of the Hungarian capital, winning further distinctions.

In mid-March 1945 the division began advancing through northern Hungary and into Czechoslovakia as part of the 18th Guards Rifle Corps in 53rd Army, ending the war against Germany near Brno. It then moved under these commands to the far east and took part in the offensive into Manchuria, winning a second battle honor in the process although it saw little actual fighting. After the war it was moved with its Corps to western Siberia and continued to serve until 1960.

== Formation ==
By mid-1943 most of the Red Army's remaining rifle brigades were being amalgamated into rifle divisions as experience had shown this was a more efficient use of manpower.

=== 6th Guards Rifle Brigade ===
This brigade began service as the 3rd formation of the 2nd Airborne Brigade in July 1942 but by the month's end had been redesignated in the Transcaucasus Military District. In August it was moved to the North Caucasus where it joined the 10th Guards Rifle Corps and it mostly remained under this command until it was reformed. For nearly a year it took part in battles against German Army Group A in the Caucasus region, eventually facing the defenses of 17th Army in the Kuban Bridgehead in the early summer of 1943.

=== 9th Guards Rifle Brigade ===
The 9th Guards was formed from July 30 to August 10, 1942 from the 3rd formation of the 5th Airborne Brigade in the Transcaucasus Military District and was immediately assigned to the 11th Guards Rifle Corps. By early August it was fighting along the Terek River as the 1st Panzer Army advanced eastward, but as the momentum of this advance ebbed the Red Army began planning counterattacks. In October it was sent to the 18th Army and it fought under this command against the German defenses on the Taman Peninsula until July 1943 when it was reformed.

On July 5, 1943 the combined brigades officially became the 109th Guards in the North Caucasus Military District; as they were already Guards formations there was no presentation of a Guards banner. Once the division completed its reorganization its order of battle was as follows:

- 306th Guards Rifle Regiment
- 309th Guards Rifle Regiment
- 312th Guards Rifle Regiment
- 246th Guards Artillery Regiment
- 108th Guards Antitank Battalion (as of August 1945 the 52nd Guards Self-Propelled Artillery Battalion was added)
- 105th Guards Reconnaissance Company
- 116th Guards Sapper Battalion
- 168th Guards Signal Battalion (later 140th Guards Signal Company, later 60th Guards Signal Battalion)
- 110th Guards Medical/Sanitation Battalion
- 106th Guards Chemical Defense (Anti-gas) Company
- 107th Guards Motor Transport Company
- 104th Guards Field Bakery
- 104th Guards Divisional Veterinary Hospital
- 2293rd Field Postal Station
- 1224th Field Office of the State Bank

The division was placed under the command of Col. Ilya Vasilevich Baldynov who had been the deputy commander of the 55th Guards Rifle Division until he was seriously wounded in late May. He was of Buryat nationality and had been arrested in July 1938 during the Great Purge but was reinstated in the Red Army two years later. This officer would remain in this position for the duration of the war, becoming a Hero of the Soviet Union on September 8, 1945 and being promoted to the rank of major general on the same date. The 109th Guards did not inherit the Order of the Red Banner from the 6th Guards Brigade which it had won on December 13, 1942.

== Kuban Bridgehead ==
In the late May fighting near Moldavanskoye both Brigades had been in 10th Guards Corps of 56th Army and made only minor gains before the offensive bogged down. By the beginning of July both Brigades were still in this Corps. A new offensive began on July 16 after a massive artillery preparation at 0400 hours and initially involved only the 10th and 11th Guards Corps on a 7km-wide sector on the boundary between the 97th Jäger and 98th Infantry Divisions but this was almost immediately halted with heavy losses. On July 22 the effort expanded to include the rest of 56th Army but with no greater success. At the beginning of August the 109th Guards was the only rifle formation remaining in 10th Guards Corps, still in 56th Army, and on August 22 the STAVKA decided to cut its losses and ordered the Front to transfer seven of its divisions, including the 109th Guards, to the Reserve of the Supreme High Command for redeployment.

== Into Ukraine ==
As of the start of September the 108th and 109th Guards constituted the 10th Guards Corps, still in North Caucasus Front, but it soon began moving north to reinforce the small 44th Army in Southern Front (as of October 20 4th Ukrainian Front) by the beginning of October adding the 49th Guards Rifle Division to its composition. By this time the German Army Group South had largely fallen back to the Dniepr River but south of the Dniepr bend at Zaporozhe the rebuilt German 6th Army was still tasked with holding along the Molochna River to the east. On September 26, as the 309th Guards Rifle Regiment fought westward north of Melitopol, Sgt. Mikhail Ilyich Bakalov was serving as a mortar gunner in a battery of battalion (82mm) mortars. When the other men of the battery were killed or wounded he continued to serve his piece as long as shells were available, despite being wounded himself. Bakalov was captured in a German attack and subjected to torture but did not divulge any information before he was freed by Soviet forces. Unfortunately his wounds and injuries proved mortal and he died in hospital in Stalino on October 15. On March 19, 1944 he would be posthumously made a Hero of the Soviet Union.

On October 9 the Front resumed its offensive against 6th Army with a significant superiority of strength in all categories. The attack began on a 32km-wide front straddling Melitopol. By the 12th the 51st Army had pushed into the city from the south but the battle continued for another 12 days. Following this victory the Front began a general advance. 44th Army was making a dash to capture Nikopol on November 9 when its commander, Lt. Gen. V. A. Khomenko, and his chief of artillery, S. A. Bobkov, mistakenly took a road that led into German positions; Bobkov was killed and Khomenko mortally wounded. Based on German radio reports Stalin believed the two officers had deserted. In a rage he ordered the disbandment of 44th Army. 10th Guards Corps (now consisting of 108th Guards, 109th Guards and 77th Rifle Divisions) was reassigned to 28th Army, still in 4th Ukrainian Front.

=== Into Western Ukraine ===
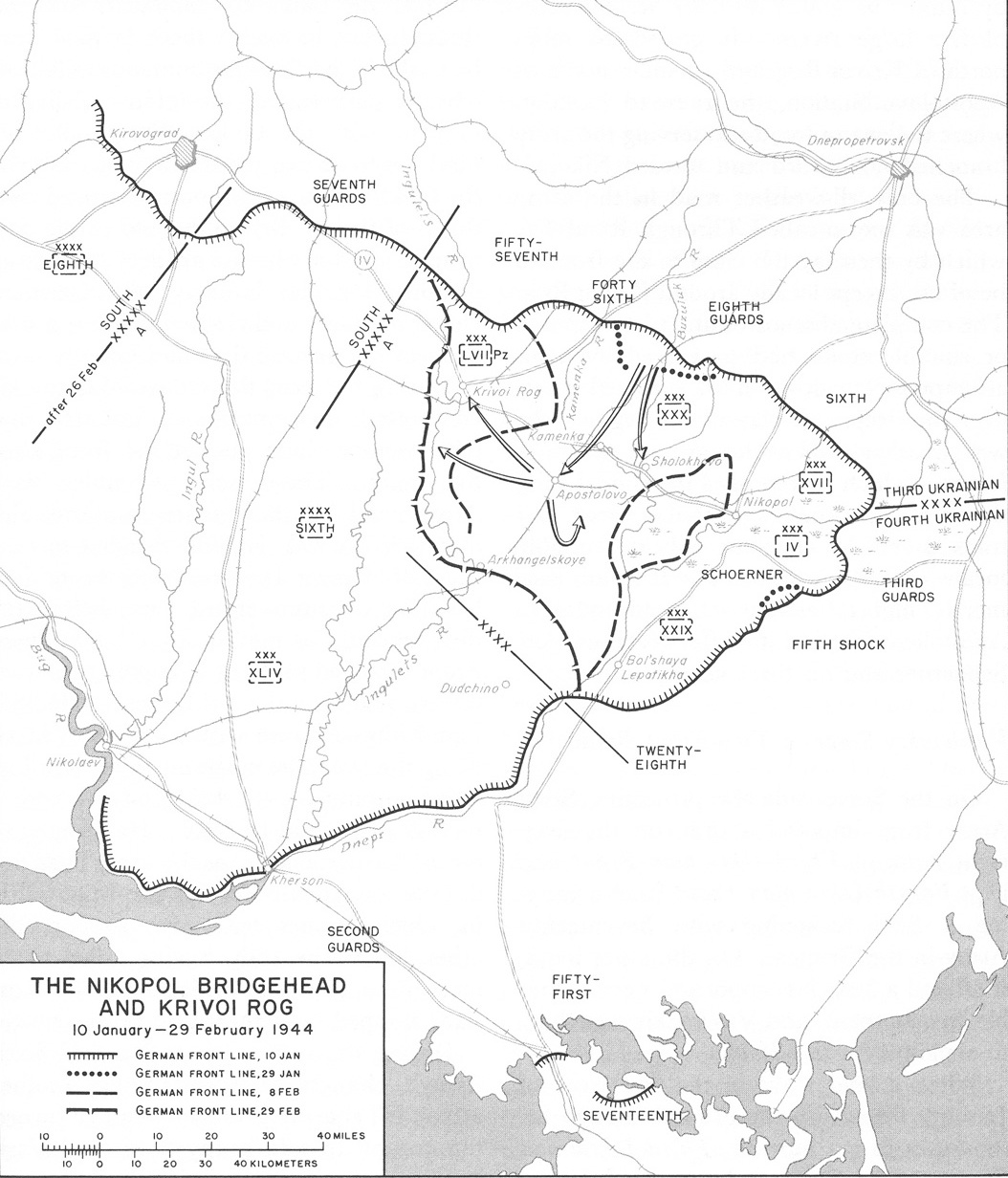
Nikopol-Krivoi Rog Offensive. Note position of 28th Army.

Until the end of February 1944 the 28th Army was involved in the Nikopol–Krivoi Rog offensive, facing the southern flank of the German-held Nikopol bridgehead over the Dniepr near Bolshaya Lepatikha until early that month when this was finally evacuated. The last German troops crossed the Dniepr on February 7 with the goal of forming a new line behind the Ingulets River. Due in part to an unusually mild winter the pace of operations on both sides remained slow through the rest of the month. During the month the Army was transferred to 3rd Ukrainian Front as 4th Ukrainian prepared for an offensive into the Crimea, and in March the 10th Guards Corps was moved to the 5th Shock Army, still in 3rd Ukrainian Front; at this time the Corps contained the 86th Guards and 109th Guards and the 320th Rifle Divisions. The Front commander, Army Gen. R. Ya. Malinovskii, began a new offensive on March 4 with the objectives of crossing the Bug and Dniestr rivers prior to forcing the border into Romania. The center of German 6th Army was struck by the 4th Guards Mechanized Corps and the 8th Guards Army, which made slow initial progress before breaking into the clear on March 7, advancing 40km and liberating Novy Bug. Malinovskii now faced the choice of striking due south toward Nikolaev or to drive west to get over the Bug behind 6th Army. Attempting to do both he gave the German forces an opportunity to escape. Despite this miscalculation the Front liberated a great deal of territory and on March 13 the 109th Guards shared an honorific with the 4th Guards Mechanized Brigade:

BERYSLAV... 109th Guards Rifle Division (Col. Baldynov, Ilya Vasilevich)... The troops who participated in the liberation of Kherson and Beryslav, by the order of the Supreme High Command of 13 March 1944, and a commendation in Moscow, are given a salute of 20 artillery salvoes from 224 guns.

On March 28 the division took part in the battle for Nikolaev with the rest of its Corps and on April 1 it was awarded the Order of the Red Banner for this victory.

=== Odessa Offensive ===
Immediately following the victory at Nikolaev the left (south) wing of 3rd Ukrainian Front continued its advance on the city of Odessa, which was expected to be taken at the earliest around April 5. This was led by Pliyev's Cavalry-Mechanized Group, followed by the 8th Guards and 6th Armies to envelop the city from the northwest and west while the 5th Shock was to advance on its defenses directly from the east.

On April 4 Pliyev's Group and the lead elements of 37th Army signalled the beginning of the final phase of the Odessa offensive by capturing the town of Razdelnaia, 60km northwest of the city, thus once again splitting German 6th Army into two distinct parts. Once this was accomplished Malinovskii ordered Pliyev to race south as fast as possible to cut the withdrawal routes of the German forces from the Odessa region. At the same time the three combined-arms armies were to move in to take the city. After heavy fighting on its northern and eastern approaches the forward detachments of 5th Shock entered its northern suburbs on the evening of April 9. Overnight the remaining Soviet forces approached Odessa's inner defenses from the northwest and west. With the trap closing shut the remainder of the defending LXXII Army Corps began breaking out to the west, allowing the Soviet forces to occupy the city's center at 1000 hours on April 10 after only minor fighting. For its part in the liberation of Odessa, on April 20 the 109th Guards would be awarded the Order of Suvorov, 2nd Degree.

=== First Jassy-Kishinev Offensive ===
Following the battle for Odessa, the STAVKA ordered Malinovskii's Front to mount a concerted effort to force the Dniestr, capture Chișinău, and eventually occupy all of eastern Bessarabia. 5th Shock and 6th Armies were engaged in mopping up Odessa and were unable to join the pursuit for at least a week, when they were to reinforce the forward armies wherever required. The initial efforts to force the river were only partially successful, with a series of small and tenuous bridgeheads being seized. On the night of April 12/13 it was decided to reinforce 8th Guards Army with part of the 5th Shock's forces, but this would not take place until April 18-20 due to the state of the roads. The Army was expected to be required to overcome German strongpoints at Cioburciu and Talmaza before advancing westward.

By April 19 the 10th Guards Corps had reached the Dniestr in the Cioburciu area but Malinovskii delayed the 5th Shock and 6th Armies' main offensives until the 25th largely due to the failures of the 5th Guards and 57th Armies' crossings near Tașlîc and the difficulty of ammunition supply. When the preliminary assault finally began it was in cooperation with 46th Army in and around Cioburciu. 5th Shock's commander, Col. Gen. V. D. Tsvetayev, arrayed his two rifle corps in a single echelon; 37th Rifle Corps was to attack on the right wing while the 10th Guards Corps attacked on the left on a 5km-wide sector from Talmaza southward to just north of Cioburciu with the 86th and 109th Guards in first echelon and the 320th in second echelon, having been given the objective of smashing the defenses of the right wing of the 97th Jäger Division and enveloping Talmaza from the south. The two Corps began their assault at dawn on April 20 after a short artillery raid but made no progress at all against stiff resistance. German reserves, including elements of the 306th and 9th Infantry Divisions, quickly arrived to bolster the defenses around Talmaza and the offensive collapsed after three days of heavy fighting and five more days of sparring for local positions. On May 4 the Army was ordered to go over to the defense.

== Into the Balkans ==
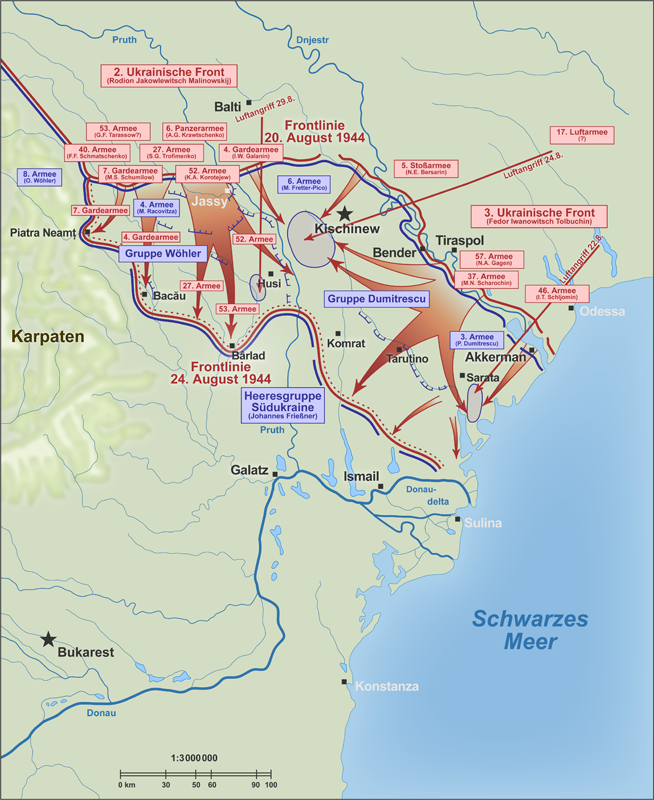
Second Jassy-Kishinev Offensive

The division, along with its 10th Guards Corps, remained in 5th Shock Army until early August, when it was transferred to the 46th Army in the buildup to the new offensive into Bessarabia. 10th Guards Corps (49th, 86th and 109th Guards Divisions) served as the Front reserve.

The offensive began on August 20 but the 86th Guards, along with its Corps, did not see any action in the first days. By 0800 hours on August 24 General Malinovskii had shifted the Corps to the boundary between the 37th and 46th Armies in the Leiptsig area and to the east. By the end of the next day the Corps was to arrive in the Comrat area; by this time the Axis Kishinev grouping had been encircled following the linkup of 3rd and 2nd Ukrainian Fronts. During the next days the 10th Guards Corps exploited to cross the Prut River while the remaining German forces were destroyed east of it.

=== Operations in Yugoslavia ===
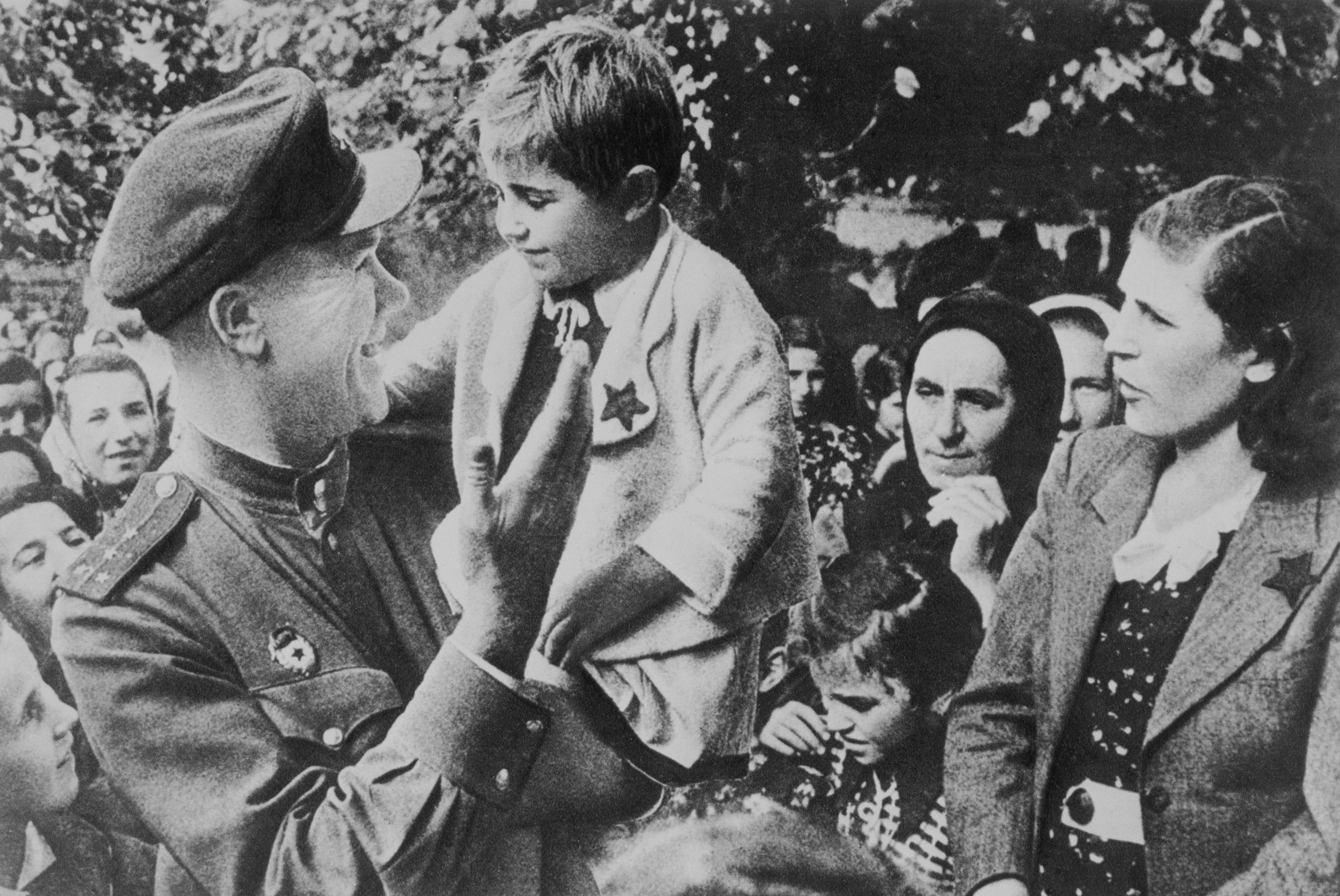
Captain Stepan Kapitonovich Ivanov, editor of the division newspaper, holds a child in a Yugoslav village, October 1944

On September 20, following the defections of Romania and Bulgaria from the Axis and as it advanced into the Balkan states, the 46th Army was subordinated to 2nd Ukrainian Front. After advancing through Romania the Army entered German-occupied Yugoslavia and took part in the liberation of its capital, Belgrade, on October 20, for which the 306th Guards Rifle Regiment (Maj. Torgashev, Ivan Aleksandrovich) and the 246th Guards Artillery Regiment (Lt. Col. Damaev, Boris Vasilevich) each received its name as a battle honor. In recognition of their roles in this battle the 309th Guards Rifle Regiment would be awarded the Order of Bogdan Khmelnitsky, 2nd Degree, while the 312th Guards Regiment would be presented with the Order of Aleksandr Nevsky, both on November 14.

In the fighting on the approaches to Belgrade Sr. Lt. Aram Avvakumovich Safarov, a company commander of the 309th Guards Rifle Regiment, was one of the first men of the division to cross the Danube in the area of Ritopek on October 7. He led his troops to cut the nearby roadway along the river and soon came under heavy counterattacks which were beaten back. The following day in the pre-dawn haze he directed fire that knocked out or destroyed eight German trucks and wagons, two tanks and eight motorcycles. Soon after the company was surrounded and Safarov raised his men to the attack by his personal example; not long after he was killed in hand-to-hand combat. On May 31, 1945 he would be posthumously made a Hero of the Soviet Union.

=== Battles for Budapest ===
As of the beginning of December the 109th Guards was still in 10th Guards Corps, and later that month 46th Army returned to 3rd Ukrainian Front. On November 4 the Army captured the city of Szolnok on the Tisza River. With the taking of Szolnok the 46th Army had arrived at the outer ring of the Budapest fortifications; it was now directed to assist in the destruction of the German and Hungarian forces between the Tisza and the Danube with the assistance of the 2nd Guards Mechanized Corps. The Axis command was determined to hold the Hungarian capital and concentrated about 200 tanks of the III Panzer Corps on this axis, along with considerable artillery. Over the following days the 46th Army was halted along the line Monor–Üllő–Rakocziliget by intensive counterattacks and heavy antitank defenses. It became clear that further efforts to take Budapest from the south would be unsuccessful and so the STAVKA began planning a renewed offensive on a broad front to outflank and encircle the city and 46th Army was ordered to temporarily go over to the defense on November 8. The offensive was to be renewed on November 11.

The Army went over to the offensive at 0850 hours with its right-flank Corps but with little success on the first day. On November 12 these Corps gained as much as 10km but failed to make further progress the next day, although the left-flank Corps captured the Axis strongpoints at Solt and Dunaegyháza. During November 14 the Army's forces cleared part of the eastern bank of the Danube but this was the end of its immediate successes. On the night of November 21/22 the 37th Corps, in conjunction with the 316th Rifle Division of 23rd Rifle Corps, forced a crossing of the Ráckevei-Duna River, leading to the capture of Csepel Island. By the end of November 26 the 46th Army was fighting along a line from outside Tápiósüly to Szigetszentmiklós and then along the river as far as Baja. Following a regrouping the 37th and 23rd Corps carried out an assault crossing on the Danube itself near Ercsi on the night of December 4/5.

=== Encirclement of Budapest ===
Later in December 46th Army returned to the command of 3rd Ukrainian Front. On December 20 the Front began a new operation to complete the encirclement of the Axis forces in Budapest. Its commander, Marshal F. I. Tolbukhin, chose to make a simultaneous breakthrough with the 46th and 4th Guards Armies. 46th Army was assigned a sector from northwest of Baracska to Kápolnásnyék with two rifle corps and was backed by 2nd Guards Mechanized; from here it was to advance to the area of Etyek–Zsámbék–Bicske and be prepared to take the western part of the city. The Army's shock group consisted of the 37th and the 10th Guards Corps on a 10km-wide front. 10th Guards Corps had the artillery of its divisions in support plus the 462nd Mortar and 47th Guards Mortar Regiments, 437th Antitank Regiment, 991st Self-Propelled Artillery Regiment (SU-76s), 3rd Mortar and 46th Cannon-Artillery Brigades. The Corps had the 49th Guards and the 180th Rifle Divisions in first echelon and the 109th Guards in second along the Corps right flank for developing the advance in the direction of Pázmánd, Vereb, and Hill 195.

The new offensive began with a 40-minute airpower and artillery preparation before the rifle divisions attacked at 1145 hours. The Army's shock group broke into the first Axis trench line and occupied it after an hour of fighting. Despite fire resistance and counterattacks the second and third lines were taken by the middle of the afternoon at which point the 109th Guards was committed in the direction of Pázmánd. By day's end the Corps had penetrated to a depth of 4-6km. Overnight the fighting continued as the artillery was brought up to resume the advance in the morning. As the success of the rifle divisions attacking along Lake Velence became clear the 2nd Guards Mechanized was committed into the gap at 1000 hours. Despite 11 counterattacks by up to two battalions of infantry and 30-40 armored vehicles each the Army advanced another 6km and widened the gap to 12km. During the night another 3km was gained to the northwest and reached the approaches to Székesfehérvár, which the Axis forces were determined to retain.

The Army continued to develop the offensive on the morning of December 22 as the 18th Tank Corps was introduced into the breach. 2nd Guards Mechanized left the 37th and 10th Guards Corps in the rear as it raced forward to take the village of Vál by surprise. The two rifle Corps made a fighting advance of up to 8km during the day and 37th Corps captured Martonvásár. The next day the offensive accelerated as the mobile corps in particular cut several routes west out of the city and the Army's main forces advanced on Bicske. From December 24-26 the 46th and 4th Guards Armies continued to march toward a linkup with 2nd Ukrainian Front in the vicinity of Esztergom. As the encirclement was completed on December 26 the 10th Guards Corps captured the town of Budakalász and reached the Danube, closing the encirclement ring directly north of Budapest while the 37th and 23rd Rifle and 2nd Guards Mechanized Corps began street fighting along its western and southwestern outskirts.

=== Siege of Budapest ===
The battle for the city continued from January 1 - February 13, 1945 and the 109th Guards was heavily involved in the fighting for Buda while the main forces of 46th Army and, indeed, much of the rest of 3rd and 2nd Ukrainian Fronts fought off several German relief attempts. 2nd Ukrainian cleared the Pest half of the city by January 20 after which the division was reassigned to the 75th Rifle Corps along with the 180th Rifle Division directly under Front command.

During the first week of February the Axis forces were largely confined to the Citadella and held as best they could given an extreme lack of food and ammunition. On February 12 the remnants of the encircled Axis forces undertook a desperate attempt to break out. Small groups managed to filter through the positions of the besiegers and began to spread to the northwest into the rear of 3rd Ukrainian Front's right-flank units. Owing to the rapid movement of reserves all but a small number of these groups were again encircled and eventually destroyed near Pilisvörösvár. On February 13 the 312th Guards Rifle Regiment (Col. Veselkov, Dmitrii Mironovich; until 16.1.45 Col. Tatarchuk, Kondratii Safronovich) was given the honorific "Budapest" for its role in the siege, while the 306th Guards Regiment was decorated with the Order of Bogdan Khmelnitsky, 2nd Degree, on April 5.

== Into Czechoslovakia ==
Following the German "Spring Awakening" offensive in March, during which the division was assigned to the 18th Guards Rifle Corps in 46th Army, the Soviet forces in Hungary went over to the counteroffensive on the 16th. During the advance toward Austria the division broke through part of the German defense of the Transdanubian Mountains and helped capture the towns of Tata, Esztergom and others, for which the 306th Guards Rifle Regiment was awarded the Order of the Red Banner, the 309th Guards Rifle Regiment received the Order of Suvorov, 3rd Degree, and the 246th Guards Artillery Regiment was given the Order of Bogdan Khmelnitsky, 2nd Degree, all on April 26. During April the 18th Guards Corps moved to the 53rd Army, still in 2nd Ukrainian Front. The division would remain under these Corps and Army commands for the duration of the war. After the end of hostilities in Europe the 312th Guards Rifle Regiment received the Order of Kutuzov, 3rd Degree, for the liberation of Malacky, while the 309th Guards Rifle Regiment was awarded the Order of the Red Banner and the 246th Guards Artillery Regiment won the Order of Kutuzov, 3rd Degree, both for their roles in the liberation of Brno.

== Manchurian Campaign and Postwar ==
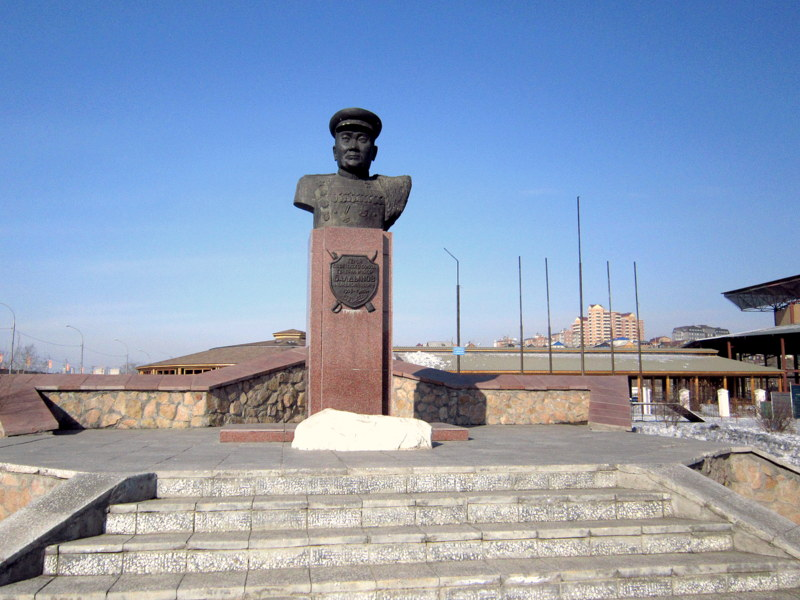
Bust of I. V. Baldynov in Ulan-Ude

53rd Army was selected for transfer to the far east for the campaign against the Japanese Kwantung Army in Manchuria, largely due to its experience in fighting through the Carpathian Mountains during 1944-45. The 109th Guards was reinforced with the 52nd Guards Self-Propelled Artillery Battalion armed with 12 SU-76s. After crossing the continent via the Trans-Siberian Railway it joined the Transbaikal Front with 18th Guards Corps, which now consisted of the 109th and 110th Guards Rifle and the 1st Guards Airborne Rifle Divisions.

The Soviet operation began on August 9 but 53rd Army was in the Front's second echelon and remained in assembly areas in Mongolia until the second day when it began crossing the border in the tracks of 6th Guards Tank Army. The commander of Japanese 3rd Area Army had already ordered those of his forces not already cut off to withdraw to defend north and south of Mukden. The advance largely became a challenge to overcome the narrow roads and mountain passes of the Greater Khingan range. The Army accomplished this and on August 15 moved into the yawning gap between the 17th Army and 6th Guards Tanks with the objective to secure Kailu. The advance was unhindered and on September 1 the 53rd Army occupied Kailu, Chaoyang, Fuxin and Gushanbeitseifu while forward detachments reached the Chinchou area on the Gulf of Liaotung. In recognition of this victory the 109th Guards was awarded the honorific "Khingan" later that month.

With this final addition the soldiers of the division shared the official title 109th Guards Rifle, Beryslav-Khingan, Order of the Red Banner, Order of Suvorov Division. (Russian: 109-я гвардейская стрелковая Бериславско-Хинганская Краснознамённая, ордена Суворова дивизия.) 53rd Army was disbanded in October and in 1946 the 18th Guards Corps was transferred to the West Siberian Military District and stationed at Omsk. As of 1953 the 109th Guards was based at Tyumen. In 1960 the 18th Guards Corps became the basis of the 49th Guards Missile Division.
