= 108th Guards Rifle Division =

- Active: 1943–1947
- Country: Soviet Union
- Branch: Red Army
- Type: Division
- Role: Infantry
- Engagements: Kuban Bridgehead; Nikopol–Krivoi Rog offensive Uman–Botoșani offensive Odessa Offensive; First Jassy–Kishinev Offensive; Second Jassy–Kishinev Offensive; Budapest Offensive; Siege of Budapest; Operation Spring Awakening; Vienna Offensive
- Decorations: Order of the Red Banner; Order of Suvorov
- Battle honours: Nikolaev

Commanders
- Notable commanders: Col. Sergei Illarionovich Dunaev; Maj. Gen. Dmitrii Grigorevich Piskunov

The 108th Guards Rifle Division was formed as an elite infantry division of the Red Army in July 1943, based on the 4th Guards Rifle Brigade and the 10th Guards Rifle Brigade and was the first of a small series of Guards divisions formed on a similar basis. It was considered a "sister" to the 109th Guards Rifle Division and they fought along much the same combat paths until the spring of 1945.

Following a further abortive offensive against the German Gotenkopfstellung on the Taman Peninsula that month the division was moved into reserve and then sent northwest to join the 44th Army in Southern Front. During the advance to the Dniepr River in early November that Army was disbanded and the division, along with its 10th Guards Rifle Corps, was briefly reassigned to 28th Army. During the winter the division took part in the battles along the Dniepr bend until the front broke open in March 1944 and the 108th Guards advanced to the Southern Bug River, winning an honorific in the process. After taking part in the takeover of Odessa the division fought along the Dniester as part of 5th Shock Army but was brought to a halt in heavy fighting west of the river. A new offensive began in August when the division was part of 46th Army and each of its rifle regiments won battle honors during the advance through eastern Romania and into Hungary. By November it was at the outer defenses of Budapest but remained engaged in fighting for that city until it finally fell on February 13, 1945. During the last months of the war the 108th Guards played a minor part in beating back the German Army's final offensive in Hungary before advancing on Vienna as part of the 27th Army. The division compiled a fine record of service but was disbanded in 1947.

== Formation ==
By mid-1943 most of the Red Army's remaining rifle brigades were being amalgamated into rifle divisions as experience had shown this was a more efficient use of manpower.

=== 4th Guards Rifle Brigade ===
This brigade began service as the 1st formation of the 38th Rifle Brigade, formed as a "student" brigade in the Central Asia Military District in November 1941. In December it was shipped to the Moscow Defence Zone before joining the 2nd Guards Rifle Corps in the reserves of Kalinin Front in January 1942. It saw combat in the Toropets–Kholm offensive as part of 3rd Shock Army and inflicted heavy casualties on the German forces around Kholm in March; on March 17 it was redesignated as the 4th Guards.

After redesignation the Brigade returned to the Kalinin Front reserves where it added a fourth rifle battalion. In August it was moved south by rail to the North Caucasus where it joined the 10th Guards Rifle Corps and it remained under this command until it was reformed. For nearly a year it took part in battles against German Army Group A in the Caucasus region, eventually facing the defenses of 17th Army in the Kuban Bridgehead in the early summer of 1943.

=== 10th Guards Rifle Brigade ===
The 10th Guards was formed from July 30 to August 10, 1942 from the 4th Reserve Airborne Regiment in the Transcaucasus Military District and was immediately assigned to the 11th Guards Rifle Corps. By early August it was fighting along the Terek River as the 1st Panzer Army advanced eastward, but as the momentum of this advance ebbed the Red Army began planning counterattacks. When it went on the attack on November 6 it was supported by elements of the 63rd Tank Brigade, the 98th Guards Corps Artillery Regiment, the 52nd Mortar Battalion, and the 68th Guards Heavy Artillery Regiment, far more support than most rifle divisions received at this stage of the war. The 10th Guards never formed a fourth rifle battalion but by mid-1943 it did have a submachine gun battalion, a heavy machine gun battalion and large reconnaissance and sapper companies. By July it was also facing the German defenses on the Taman Peninsula.

On July 5, 1943 the combined brigades officially became the 108th Guards at Krasnodar in the North Caucasus Military District; as they were already Guards formations there was no presentation of a Guards banner. Once the division completed its reorganization its order of battle was as follows:

- 305th Guards Rifle Regiment
- 308th Guards Rifle Regiment
- 311th Guards Rifle Regiment
- 245th Guards Artillery Regiment
- 110th Guards Antitank Battalion
- 104th Guards Reconnaissance Company
- 115th Guards Sapper Battalion
- 139th Guards Signal Company (later 167th Guards Signal Battalion)
- 112th Guards Medical/Sanitation Battalion
- 105th Guards Chemical Defense (Anti-gas) Company
- 109th Guards Motor Transport Company
- 103rd Guards Field Bakery
- 106th Guards Divisional Veterinary Hospital
- 1595th Field Postal Station (later 09276th Field Postal Station)
- 1263rd Field Office of the State Bank

The division remained under the command of Col. Sergei Illarionovich Dunaev who had led the 4th Guards Brigade since March 20. Roughly 64 percent of the division's personnel came from the 4th Guards while 33 percent were from the 10th Guards. The 108th Guards inherited the Order of the Red Banner from both Brigades which they had received on December 13, 1942.

== Kuban Bridgehead ==
In the late May fighting near Moldavanskoye both Brigades had been in 10th Guards Corps of 56th Army and made only minor gains before the offensive bogged down. By the beginning of July the 10th Brigade was still in this Corps but the 4th Brigade was a separate unit under direct Army Command. A new offensive began on July 16 after a massive artillery preparation at 0400 hours and initially involved only the 10th and 11th Guards Corps on a 7km-wide sector on the boundary between the 97th Jäger and 98th Infantry Divisions but this was almost immediately halted with heavy losses. On July 22 the effort expanded to include the rest of 56th Army but with no greater success. At the beginning of August the 108th Guards was serving as a separate division in the reserves of North Caucasus Front, and on August 22 the STAVKA decided to cut its losses and ordered the Front to transfer seven of its divisions, including the 108th Guards, to the Reserve of the Supreme High Command for redeployment.

== Into Ukraine ==
As of the start of September the 108th and 109th Guards constituted the 10th Guards Corps, still in North Caucasus Front, but it soon began moving north to reinforce the small 44th Army in Southern Front (as of October 20 4th Ukrainian Front) by the beginning of October adding the 49th Guards Rifle Division to its composition. By this time the German Army Group South had largely fallen back to the Dniepr River but south of the Dniepr bend at Zaporozhe the rebuilt German 6th Army was still tasked with holding along the Molochna River to the east. On September 26 Maj. Vasilii Yakovlevich Antropov was leading his battalion of the 311th Guards Rifle Regiment toward the village of Voroshilovka in the Tokmak Raion. Under cover of an artillery bombardment the battalion crept up to the village undetected, crossed an antitank ditch, broke through the defenses and seized the objective. Under Antropov's leadership over 200 German soldiers and officers were killed or wounded and two ammunition depots, a mortar battery and four guns were captured. In later fighting he suffered a head wound and despite being admitted to hospital on October 3 he died four days later. On November 1 he was posthumously made a Hero of the Soviet Union.

On October 9 the Front resumed its offensive against 6th Army with a significant superiority of strength in all categories. The attack began on a 32km-wide front straddling Melitopol. By the 12th the 51st Army had pushed into the city from the south but the battle continued for another 12 days. Following this victory the Front began a general advance. 44th Army was making a dash to capture Nikopol on November 9 when its commander, Lt. Gen. V. A. Khomenko, and his chief of artillery, S. A. Bobkov, mistakenly took a road that led into German positions; Bobkov was killed and Khomenko mortally wounded. Based on German radio reports Stalin believed the two officers had deserted. In a rage he ordered the disbandment of 44th Army. 10th Guards Corps (now consisting of 108th Guards, 109th Guards and 77th Rifle Divisions) was reassigned to 28th Army, still in 4th Ukrainian Front.

=== Into Western Ukraine ===
Uman–Botoșani Offensive. Note the liberation of Nikolaev in the lower right corner.

The assignment to 28th Army was short-lived as on December 5 the division was moved back to the Reserve of the Supreme High Command for rebuilding. Along with three other rebuilding Guards divisions it joined the 31st Guards Rifle Corps in 69th Army. It left the Reserve on February 1, 1944 while still in 69th Army but soon came under command of the 3rd Guards Rifle Corps in 5th Shock Army in 3rd Ukrainian Front. During the Uman–Botoșani offensive on March 28 forces of this Front liberated the city of Nikolaev and the division was awarded an honorific:

NIKOLAEV (Nikolaev Oblast)... 108th Guards Rifle Division (Col. Dunaev, Sergei Illarionovich)... The troops who participated in the liberation of Nikolaev, by the order of the Supreme High Command of 28 March 1944, and a commendation in Moscow, are given a salute of 20 artillery salvoes from 224 guns.

In a further change of assignment in the last days of March the division joined the 37th Rifle Corps, commanded by Maj. Gen. S. F. Gorokhov, still in 5th Shock Army, and it would remain under this command for the duration of the war.

=== Odessa Offensive ===
Immediately following the victory at Nikolaev the left (south) wing of 3rd Ukrainian Front continued its advance on the city of Odessa, which was expected to be taken at the earliest around April 5. This was led by Pliyev's Cavalry-Mechanized Group, followed by the 8th Guards and 6th Armies to envelop the city from the northwest and west while the 5th Shock was to advance on its defenses directly from the east.

On April 4 Pliyev's Group and the lead elements of 37th Army signalled the beginning of the final phase of the Odessa offensive by capturing the town of Razdelnaia, 60km northwest of the city, thus once again splitting German 6th Army into two distinct parts. Once this was accomplished Malinovskii ordered Pliyev to race south as fast as possible to cut the withdrawal routes of the German forces from the Odessa region. At the same time the three combined-arms armies were to move in to take the city. After heavy fighting on its northern and eastern approaches the forward detachments of 5th Shock entered its northern suburbs on the evening of April 9. Overnight the remaining Soviet forces approached Odessa's inner defenses from the northwest and west. With the trap closing shut the remainder of the defending LXXII Army Corps began breaking out to the west, allowing the Soviet forces to occupy the city's center at 1000 hours on April 10 after only minor fighting. For its part in the takeover of Odessa, on April 20 the 108th Guards would be awarded the Order of Suvorov, 2nd Degree.

=== First Jassy–Kishinev Offensive ===
Following the battle for Odessa, the STAVKA ordered 3rd Ukrainian Front to mount a concerted effort to force the Dniester, capture Chișinău, and eventually occupy all of eastern Bessarabia. 5th Shock and 6th Armies were engaged in mopping up Odessa and were unable to join the pursuit for at least a week, when they were to reinforce the forward armies wherever required. The initial efforts to force the river were only partially successful, with a series of small and tenuous bridgeheads being seized. On the night of April 12/13 it was decided to reinforce 8th Guards Army with part of the 5th Shock's forces, but this would not take place until April 18-20 due to the state of the roads. The Army was expected to be required to overcome German strongpoints at Cioburciu and Talmaza before advancing westward.

By April 19 the 37th Corps had reached the Dniester northwest of Cioburciu but the Front commander, Army Gen. R. Ya. Malinovskii, delayed the 5th Shock and 6th Armies' main offensives until the 25th largely due to the failures of the 5th Guards and 57th Armies' crossings near Tașlîc and the difficulty of ammunition supply. When the preliminary assault finally began it was in cooperation with 46th Army in and around Cioburciu. 5th Shock's commander, Col. Gen. V. D. Tsvetaev, arrayed his two rifle corps in a single echelon; 37th Corps was to attack on the right wing while the 10th Guards Corps attacked on the left. The history of the 108th Guards describes the following events:

The commander of 37th Rifle Corps assigned our division the mission of forcing the Dniester on the night of 18-19 April, seizing the flatlands along the river, and subsequently capturing the central part of the town of Talmazy. The 97th Jäger Division's 204th and 207th Regiments defended the main sector of the defense opposite the division's assault. The 308th and 311th Rifle Regiments, which were in first echelon, forced the river by handmade means, each with a reinforced battalion in advance. Three artillery battalions and two batteries of antitank artillery supported each regiment. A total of 74 guns and mortars per kilometre of front, which supported the crossing, reliably suppressed the enemy's defenses in the immediate region of the river's western bank and his artillery batteries situated in the depths. By the next morning, both regiments had successfully forced the Dniestr and, after destroying the enemy's covering subunits, rapidly overcame the flood plains and reached the old branch of the river, along which the enemy's main defenses were situated... The terrain was swampy with a great number of lakes, and, therefore, each formation operated along its own axis without close contact with its neighbor. We attempted to penetrate the defensive lines several times but without any results. The enemy had a high density of firing means [weapons], a trench system, and, first and foremost, favorable terrain conditions. There was a water barrier, the old branch of the river, in front of his forward edge, and it was up to 15 metres wide and two metres deep, which was difficult to overcome.

The 97th Jäger was able to concentrate its forces with the arrival of reinforcements from the 306th Infantry Division around Talmaza. This strongpoint was to be enveloped from the north and northwest while the 10th Guards Corps did the same from the south. Additional reinforcements from the 9th Infantry Division also arrived south of the village. As a result, and as described above, Tsvetaev's offensive collapsed of exhaustion after three days of heavy fighting and five more days of local battles for position before 5th Shock went over to the defense on May 4.

Prior to a new effort to drive into Bessarabia General Malinovskii carried out an extensive regrouping of his Front. Among other measures the 37th Rifle Corps was transferred to 46th Army, where it would remain until the last months of the war. This Army was on the left flank of 5th Shock and while the 37th Corps remained in mostly the same positions other corps of both Armies redeployed to the north. The STAVKA specified that the renewed offensive was to begin no later than May 25, although difficulties with the regrouping and unexpected German actions would force a postponement to May 30.

One of these unexpected actions began on May 13. While in 5th Shock Army, the 320th Rifle Division had crossed the river at Cioburciu. Due to the Front regrouping that division was now in 37th Corps, holding a bridgehead between 1–2km deep and 3km wide in low-lying marshlands, with German forces in possession of the high ground. The 108th Guards was on the division's right flank and its left was on the river itself, with the remainder of 46th Army still on the east bank. Before dawn a powerful 50-minute artillery preparation struck the 320th's defenses, followed by an attack by elements of 6th Army's XXIX and XXX Army Corps. The division beat off the first reconnaissance-in-force, but after a further bombardment the full assault began at 0700 hours. The 478th and 481st Rifle Regiments, in the front line, began to give ground grudgingly. A battlegroup of the German 3rd Mountain Division split the bridgehead and drove a wedge between the two Soviet divisions, making it impossible for the Guardsmen to support their Corps-mates. By 0800 hours the men of the 320th found themselves literally with their backs to the river, with no room to maneuver and increasingly vulnerable to enemy fire. At 0930 hours their only river crossing was destroyed, and the defenders were effectively encircled. During the next four hours, while defending heroically, the rifle regiments were destroyed, with only a few stragglers managing to swim the river. This disaster finally forced Malinovskii to suspend offensive operations for the next three months.

== Into the Balkans ==
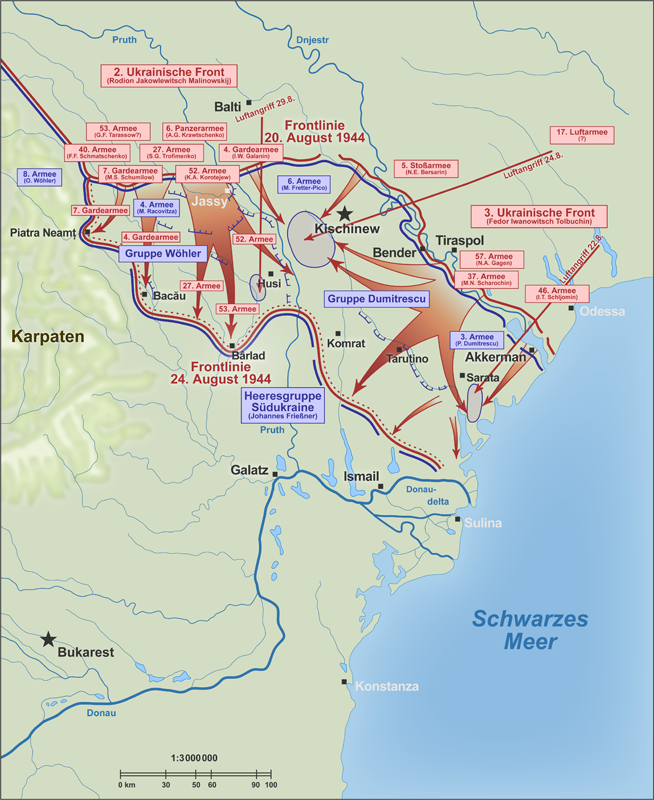
The Second Jassy–Kishinev Offensive

At the start of the Second Jassy–Kishinev Operation 37th Corps had the 59th and 108th Guards plus the rebuilt 320th Division under command. 46th Army was on the Front's left (south) flank covering a frontage of 111km but its main attack would be along an 8km-wide sector between Talmaza and Cioburciu. The 37th and 31st Guards Corps, both deployed in two echelons, made up the main shock force attacking in the direction of Volintiri while the 34th Rifle Corps would make a supporting attack toward Slobozia; 10th Guards Corps, which had also been assigned to 46th Army, would serve as the Front reserve. The shock group would be supported by 200-250 guns and mortars per kilometre of the Corps' attack frontage. In direct fire support the 46th Army also had a battalion of 23 captured self-propelled guns. The 4th Guards Mechanized Corps formed the mobile group to exploit the Army's breakthrough.

The offensive began on August 20. On that first day the two Corps broke through the German XXIX Corps' defense along the boundary with XXX Corps, helped inflict a heavy defeat on the 4th Romanian Mountain Division and forced 21st Romanian Infantry Division out of its defenses while the German 306th Infantry suffered heavy casualties. 37th Corps also captured the town of Cioburciu and penetrated up to 12km into a gap as much as 40km wide jointly with 31st Guards Corps. During the next day all three divisions of 37th Corps reached a line south of Khadzhailar and Slobozia. By the end of August 22 advance elements of 37th Corps advanced as far as Zabar, and 3rd Ukrainian Front had torn a gap in the enemy front 130km wide and as much as 70km deep. On the next day 46th Army continued the operations that encircled the Akkerman group of Romanian Third Army, and 37th Corps forced a crossing of the Cogâlnic River.

As a result of this offensive on August 26 the 311th Guards Rifle Regiment (Col. Rudko, Yosif Petrovich) would be awarded the battle honor "Izmail", while on September 7 the 305th Guards Regiment was given the honorific "Lower Dniestr". As the advance continued into the Balkans on October 11 the 308th Guards Regiment (Col. Tatarchuk, Kondratii Safronovich) would win a similar honor for its part in the capture of the Hungarian city of Szeged.

=== Budapest Campaign ===
By the beginning of October the 46th Army had come under command of 2nd Ukrainian Front; at this time 37th Corps contained only the 108th Guards and the 320th Rifle Divisions. The offensive into Hungary continued apace and on November 4 the division took part in the capture of the city of Szolnok on the Tisza River, for which the 311th Guards Rifle Regiment and the 245th Guards Artillery Regiment each received the Order of the Red Banner on November 19.

With the taking of Szolnok the 46th Army had arrived at the outer ring of the Budapest fortifications; it was now directed to assist in the destruction of the German and Hungarian forces between the Tisza and the Danube with the assistance of the 2nd Guards Mechanized Corps. The Axis command was determined to hold the Hungarian capital and concentrated about 200 tanks of the III Panzer Corps on this axis, along with considerable artillery. Over the following days the 46th Army was halted along the line Monor–Üllő–Rakocziliget by intensive counterattacks and heavy antitank defenses. It became clear that further efforts to take Budapest from the south would be unsuccessful and so the STAVKA began planning a renewed offensive on a broad front to outflank and encircle the city and 46th Army was ordered to temporarily go over to the defense on November 8. The offensive was to be renewed on November 11.

For this effort the 108th Guards had the 1897th Self-Propelled Artillery Regiment (SU-76s) in direct support of its attack toward Pánd. The Army went over to the offensive at 0850 hours with its right-flank Corps but with little success on the first day. On November 12 these Corps gained as much as 10km but failed to make further progress the next day, although the left-flank Corps captured the Axis strongpoints at Solt and Dunaegyháza. During November 14 the Army's forces cleared part of the eastern bank of the Danube but this was the end of its immediate successes. On the night of November 21/22 the 37th Corps, in conjunction with the 316th Rifle Division of 23rd Rifle Corps, forced a crossing of the Ráckevei-Duna River. This operation was carried out in darkness, without an artillery preparation, along a front of about 25km and largely took the defenders by surprise, leading to the capture of Tököl, Szigetcsép and Ráckeve on Csepel Island. By the end of November 26 the 46th Army was fighting along a line from outside Tápiósüly to Szigetszentmiklós and then along the river as far as Baja.

Following a regrouping the 37th and 23rd Corps were ready for an assault crossing on the Danube itself near Ercsi on the night of December 4/5. Again this was intended as a "silent" crossing without artillery preparation, although a fire plan was prepared in case of heavy resistance. During this operation two men of the 167th Guards Signal Battalion distinguished themselves sufficiently to be made Heroes of the Soviet Union. Cpt. Grigorii Yakovlevich Yamushev was the battalion commander. As the boat containing himself and three of his field phone operators neared the west bank it took a near-miss from an artillery shell and capsized; Yamushev himself was wounded. Despite this he led his men to the shore by swimming and they soon established wire communications with Colonel Dunaev's headquarters. During the following day this connection was broken four times but restored under Yamushev's leadership. One of the men who carried out this work was Sen. Sgt. Ivan Alekseevich Shchipakin. After landing with the first boat he established contact with a rifle battalion. When the wire was broken by artillery fire he recrossed the Danube; while returning his boat was damaged and the wire became entangled in the propeller so Shchipakin entered the water to unwind it. Upon again reaching the west bank he reestablished contact with the battalion and maintained it. Yamushev retired from the Red Army in December 1945 due to his injuries but worked in several jobs, including editor of a district newspaper, before his death in 1978 at the age of 59. Shchipakin rose to the rank of major in the Soviet Army before moving to the reserve in 1971. He then served for many years as an elected deputy for Stavropol in regional government. He died in that city in February 2016 at the age of 92.

=== Encirclement of Budapest ===
Later in December 46th Army returned to the command of 3rd Ukrainian Front and the division would remain in that Front for the remainder of the war. On December 20 the Front began a new operation to complete the encirclement of the Axis forces in Budapest. Its commander, Marshal F. I. Tolbukhin, chose to make a simultaneous breakthrough with the 46th and 4th Guards Armies. 46th Army was assigned a sector from northwest of Baracska to Kápolnásnyék with two rifle corps and was backed by 2nd Guards Mechanized; from here it was to advance to the area of Etyek–Zsámbék–Bicske and be prepared to take the western part of the city. The Army's shock group consisted of the 37th and the 10th Guards Corps on a 10km-wide front. 37th Corps had the artillery of its divisions in support plus the 87th Guards Mortar Regiment, 1505th Self-Propelled Artillery Regiment (SU-76s), 25th Howitzer, 11th Light Artillery, 9th and 17th Cannon-Artillery Brigades. The Corps had the 108th Guards and the 320th in first echelon and the 59th Guards in second.

The new offensive began with a 40-minute airpower and artillery preparation before the rifle divisions attacked at 1145 hours. The Army's shock group broke into the first Axis trench line and occupied it after an hour of fighting. Despite fire resistance and counterattacks the second and third lines were taken by the middle of the afternoon at which point the 59th Guards was committed in the direction of Kajaszoszentpeter. By day's end the Corps had penetrated to a depth of 4-6km. Overnight the fighting continued as the artillery was brought up to resume the advance in the morning. As the success of the rifle divisions attacking along Lake Velence became clear the 2nd Guards Mechanized was committed into the gap at 1000 hours. Despite 11 counterattacks by up to two battalions of infantry and 30-40 armored vehicles each the Army advanced another 6km and widened the gap to 12km. During the night another 3km was gained to the northwest and reached the approaches to Székesfehérvár, which the Axis forces were determined to retain.

The Army continued to develop the offensive on the morning of December 22 as the 18th Tank Corps was introduced into the breach. 2nd Guards Mechanized left the 37th and 10th Guards Corps in the rear as it raced forward to take the village of Vál by surprise. The two rifle Corps made a fighting advance of up to 8km during the day and 37th Corps, in cooperation with 23rd Corps, captured Martonvásár. The next day the offensive accelerated as the mobile corps in particular cut several routes west out of the city and the Army's main forces advanced on Bicske. From December 24-26 the 46th and 4th Guards Armies continued to march toward a linkup with 2nd Ukrainian Front in the vicinity of Esztergom. As the encirclement was completed on December 26 the 37th and 23rd Rifle and 2nd Guards Mechanized Corps began street fighting along the western and southwestern outskirts of Budapest.

=== Siege of Budapest ===
The battle for the city continued from January 1 - February 13, 1945 and the 108th Guards was heavily involved in the fighting for Buda along with the rest of its Corps and the 75th Rifle Corps while the main forces of 46th Army and, indeed, much of the rest of 3rd and 2nd Ukrainian Fronts fought off several German relief attempts. On the first day the division, supported by the 1897th S-P Regiment, operating from the St. Janos Hospital area, launched its first attack on the Városmajor park, but this was unsuccessful due to resistance from the Hungarian Vannay Battalion and elements of the 22nd SS Cavalry Division Maria Theresia. Further efforts over the coming days made no further progress and it was not until January 19 that the 320th Rifle Division took the park. The 297th Rifle Division was now committed between the 108th Guards to the north and the 320th to the south for a renewed drive toward the Danube, backed by T34-85 tanks of the 21st Guards and 3rd Tank Brigades. This advance ran into the 13th Panzer Division around the Ganz factory and halted. On January 20 the two Corps were subordinated to 2nd Ukrainian Front after other forces of that Front took the eastern (Pest) sector of the city. During the first week of February the Axis forces were largely confined to the Citadella and held as best they could given an extreme lack of food and ammunition.

On February 12 the remnants of the encircled Axis forces undertook a desperate attempt to break out. Small groups managed to filter through the positions of the besiegers and began to spread to the northwest into the rear of 3rd Ukrainian Front's right-flank units. Owing to the rapid movement of reserves all but a small number of these groups were again encircled and eventually destroyed near Pilisvörösvár. On February 13 the 308th Guards Rifle Regiment (Lt. Col. Nastagunin, Vasilii Stepanovich) and the 110th Guards Antitank Battalion (Cpt. Mishchenko, Pavel Fyodorovich) were both granted the honorific "Budapest" for their roles in the siege.

== Into Austria and Postwar ==
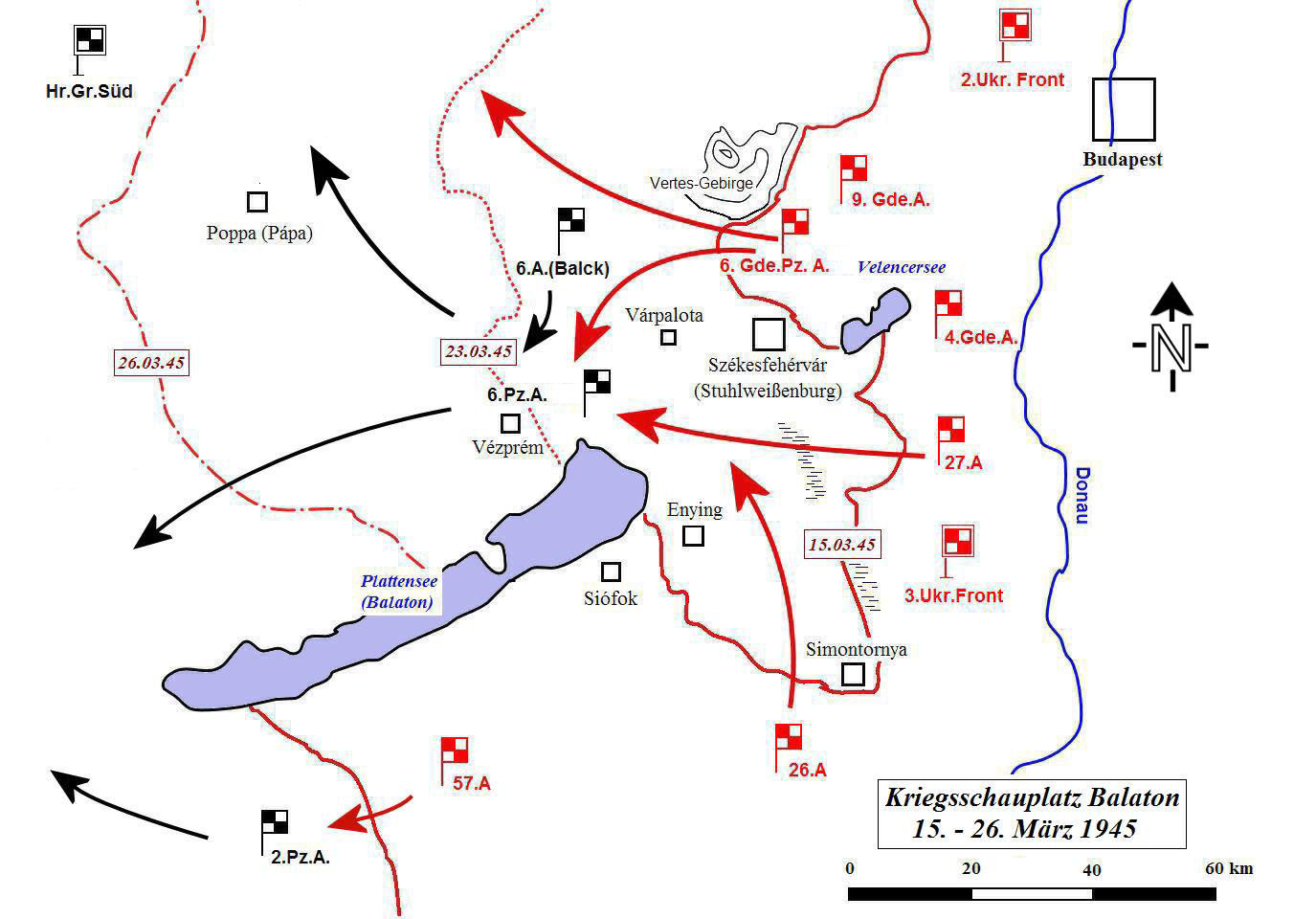
Start of Soviet counteroffensive. Note position of 27th Army.

By the beginning of March the division, along with the rest of 37th Corps, had returned to 3rd Ukrainian Front, but now as part of 27th Army. On March 10 Colonel Dunaev was sent to study at the Voroshilov Academy; he would be made a Hero of the Soviet Union on April 28, largely for his leadership of the division in the battle for the Ercsi bridgehead. He was replaced the next day bu Maj. Gen. Dmitrii Grigorevich Piskunov, who had previously commanded the 66th Rifle Division and served as the deputy commander of the 41st Guards Rifle Division. He would remain in command of the 108th Guards into the postwar.

During Operation Spring Awakening, which began on March 6, the 27th Army was in the Front's second echelon and in the event saw little action before the Soviet forces went over to the offensive on March 16. As the Vienna Offensive continued the division took part in the recapture of Székesfehérvár and the capture of Mór, Veszprém and other towns and on April 26 the 305th and 311th Guards Rifle Regiments would each receive the Order of Bogdan Khmelnitsky, 2nd Degree, for their roles in these successes. The Front crossed into Austria on March 30 and the division ended the war in western Austria with the full title of 108th Guards Rifle, Nikolaev, Order of the Red Banner, Order of Suvorov Division. (Russian: 108-я гвардейская стрелковая Николаевская Краснознамённая ордена Суворова дивизия.)

27th Army was withdrawn to eastern Romania by August 20 and by November the 108th Guards had been transferred to the 35th Guards Rifle Corps. Shortly afterward the Army was again moved, now to the Carpathian Military District. The Army headquarters was disbanded there in August 1946 and sometime after the division was transferred to the Odessa Military District where it was itself disbanded in 1947.

== In popular culture ==
The 108th Guards Rifle Division is featured extensively in Multi-Man Publishing's 2011 Historical Advanced Squad Leader module Festung Budapest.
