= Ivan Babanin =

- Иван Акимович Бабанин
- Born: 10 June 1923; Osinovy, Kursky Uyezd, Kursk Governorate, Russian SFSR, Soviet Union
- Died: 25 December 1994 (aged 71); Kursk, Russia
- Military career
- Allegiance: Soviet Union
- Branch: Infantry
- Service years: 1941–1945
- Rank: Captain
- Conflicts: Great Patriotic War
- Awards: Hero of the Soviet Union

Ivan Akimovich Babanin (Russian: Иван Акимович Бабанин; 10 June 1923 – 25 December 1994) was a captain of the Red Army. He served during the Second World War, and was awarded the title of Hero of the Soviet Union in 1945.

== Biography ==
Ivan Babanin was born on 10 June 1923, in Osinovy (now in Medvensky District, Kursk Oblast) into a peasant family. After graduating from elementary school, he worked as a combine operator at a machine and tractor station. In July 1941 he was called up for service in the Red Army. Since July 1942 - on the fronts of the Great Patriotic War. In 1944, Babanin graduated from the artillery school in Dnepropetrovsk. By December 1944, Senior Lieutenant Babanin commanded a rifle platoon of the 305th Guards Rifle Regiment of the 108th Guards Rifle Division of the 46th Army of the 2nd Ukrainian Front. He distinguished himself during the liberation of Hungary.

On the night of 5 December 1944, a platoon under the command of Babanin, among the first in the battalion, crossed the Danube near the city of Ercsi, south of Budapest, entrenched on the other side and defended the bridgehead, which ensured the successful crossing of other units of the Soviet troops.

By a decree of the Presidium of the Supreme Soviet of the Soviet Union of 24 March 1945, Ivan Babanin was awarded the title of Hero of the Soviet Union with the Order of Lenin and the Gold Star medal.

In 1945, with the rank of captain, Babanin was transferred to the reserve. He worked as the chairman of a collective farm in his native village, then lived in Kursk, worked as an assistant to the head of a paramilitary guard at one of the factories. In 1950 he joined the CPSU (b). He died on 25 December 1994, and was buried at the memorial to those who fell during the Great Patriotic War in Kursk.

He was also awarded the Order of the Patriotic War of the 1st degree, the Order of the Red Star, and a number of medals.

== Literature ==
- Ivan Akimovich Babanin. Site "Heroes of the country".
- Heroes of the Soviet Union: A Brief Biographical Dictionary / Prev. ed. Collegium I. N. Shkadov. - M .: Military Publishing, 1987. - T. 1 / Abaev - Lyubichev /. — 911 p. — 100,000 copies. — ISBN ots., Reg. No. in RCP 87–95382.
- Babanin Ivan Akimovich // Golden Stars of the Kuryans: a collection of essays, documents and materials / comp. T. V. Ivanova, V. G. Plyushchev; under total ed. T. I. Arkhipova. - Voronezh: Central Black Earth Book Publishing House, 1966. - S. 137. - 348 p. — 20,000 copies.
