= Ivan Rosly =

Ivan Pavlovich Rosly
- Born: 28 June 1902; Petrovskaya Buda, Oryol Governorate, Russian Empire
- Died: 15 October 1980 (aged 78); Moscow, Soviet Union
- Military career
- Allegiance: Soviet Union
- Branch: Red Army
- Service years: 1924–1961
- Rank: Lieutenant general
- Commands: 4th Rifle Division; 11th Guards Rifle Corps; 46th Army; 9th Rifle Corps; 16th Guards Rifle Corps
- Conflicts: World War II
- Awards: Hero of the Soviet Union

Ivan Pavlovich Rosly (Russian: Ива́н Па́влович Ро́слый; 28 June 1902 – 15 October 1980) was a Soviet Army lieutenant general and a Hero of the Soviet Union who held division, army and corps command during World War II.

== Early life and prewar service ==
A Russian, Ivan Pavlovich Rosly was born on 28 June 1902 in the village of Petrovskaya Buda, Oryol Governorate. He was conscripted into the Red Army on 23 May 1924 and served as a Red Army man and squad leader with the 1st Separate Convoy Battalion of the Ukrainian Military District. In November 1925 he was transferred to serve as a company politruk in the 151st Rifle Regiment of the 51st Rifle Division. Rosly completed the courses for politruks at the Kiev Infantry School in 1929 and passed external exams for the infantry school that year. Rosly was transferred to the Soviet Far East to become chief of staff of the 105th Rifle Division of the Special Red Banner Far Eastern Army. This assignment proved brief as in August 1936 he was transferred to command a rifle battalion of the 95th Rifle Regiment of the 32nd Rifle Division. Graduating from the Vystrel course in 1937, Rosly entered the Frunze Military Academy that year.

Sent to the front with a group of academy instructors and students, he took part in the September 1939 Soviet invasion of Poland. After the Winter War began, Rosly was sent to the front to gain combat experience, and appointed commander of the 245th Rifle Regiment of the 123rd Rifle Division in November 1939. He led the regiment in the Winter War and in early March the regiment was first in the division to break through the Mannerheim Line, captured several reinforced concrete pillboxes and developing the offensive, ensured the success of the division. For this feat Rosly was awarded the title Hero of the Soviet Union on 21 March 1940. Having graduated from the academy, Rosly was appointed commander of the 4th Rifle Division at Batumi in April 1940.

== Eastern Front ==
After Operation Barbarossa began on 22 June, the 4th Rifle Division covered the Soviet border with Turkey and the Black Sea coast as part of the 3rd Rifle Corps, later expanded into the 46th Army of the Transcaucasus Front. The division arrived to the 18th Army of the Southern Front in the area of Timashevsk on 17 September, entering intense fighting. With this army the division fought in the Donbass defensive operation in fall 1941. At the end of October and in November, after reorganization, the division shifted to the 12th Army and fought in the Barvenkovo–Lozovaya offensive, the Voronezh-Voroshilovgrad Defensive, and the Donbass defensive operations. From the end of July the division fought on the Tuapse axis as part of the 37th Army of the North Caucasus Front and the Northern Group of the Transcaucasus Front (from 29 July). In late August the division was disbanded, and Major General Rosly appointed deputy commander of the 11th Guards Rifle Corps of the 9th Army of the Northern Group of Forces of the Transcaucasus Front. On 2 September he took command of this corps. During the fall of 1942, Rosly led the corps in the Mozdok-Malgobek and then the Nalchik-Ordzhonikidze defensive operations. The corps was especially distinguished in the repulse of the German offensive towards Mozdоk and in the disruption of the attempt to break through to the oil region of the Caucasus. In these battles Rosyli showed himself to be a "courageous and decisive" commander, "constantly in the combat units" of the corps. In December, Rosly was appointed deputy commander of the 58th Army, which conducted defensive battles on the line of Mozdok and Verkhny Kurp. Simultaneously one rifle division of the army continued to defend in the Makhachkala area.

Rosly rose to command the 46th Army on 25 January 1943. The army was part of the Black Sea Group of Forces of the Transcaucasus Front, which on 5 February became part of the reestablished North Caucasus Front. He led the army in the successful operations to destroy German troops in the North Caucasus and liberation of the cities of Maykop and Krasnodar. At the end of February the army was withdrawn to the front reserve, and on 29 March to the Reserve of the Supreme High Command. In May he returned to his old post of deputy commander of the 58th Army, now defending the coast of the Sea of Azov as part of the North Caucasus Front.

Rosly took command of the 9th Rifle Corps on 18 June 1943. He led the corps in the Donbas strategic offensive, the Melitopol offensive, the Battle of the Dnieper, the Nikopol–Krivoi Rog offensive, the Bereznegovatoye–Snigirevka offensive, the Odessa Offensive, the Second Jassy–Kishinev offensive, the Warsaw–Poznan Offensive, the Vistula–Oder offensive, and the Berlin Offensive. The corps was part of the 9th Army of the North Caucasus Front, the 5th Shock, 28th and 57th Armies of the Southern, 4th and 3rd Ukrainian, and 1st Belorussian Fronts in these battles. In 1945, Rosly was promoted to lieutenant general.

== Postwar ==
After the end of the war, Rosly studied at the Higher Academic Courses at the Voroshilov Higher Military Academy from March 1947. Graduating from the courses in April 1948, Rosyli was placed at the disposal of the Main Personnel Directorate and in August appointed assistant commander of the 11th Guards Army of the Baltic Military District. He commanded the 16th Guards Rifle Corps from August 1949 and in September 1955 rose to first deputy commander of the 11th Guards Army. In March 1957 he was appointed first deputy commander of the Carpathian Military District for military training institutions. Rosly retired from the army on 11 May 1961, almost age 59. Rosly died on 15 October 1980 in Moscow.

== Decorations ==
Rosly was a recipient of the following decorations:

- Order of Lenin (3)
- Order of the Red Banner (4)
- Order of Suvorov, 2nd class
- Order of Kutuzov, 2nd class
- Order of Bogdan Khmelnitsky, 2nd class
- Medals
- Foreign orders and medals
