= 320th Division =

320th Division may refer to:

- 320th Infantry Division (Wehrmacht), Germany
- 320th Division (Imperial Japanese Army)
- 320th Rifle Division, Soviet Union
- 320th Division (Vietnam)

== See also ==
- List of military divisions by number
