= 297th Division =

297th Division may refer to:

- 297th Infantry Division, Wehrmacht, Germany
- 297th Rifle Division, Soviet Union

== See also ==
- List of military divisions by number
