= Ivan Shlyomin =

Soviet Lieutenant-General

Ivan Shlyomin Иван Тимофеевич Шлёмин
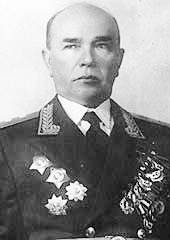
- Born: Kalininsky District, Tver Oblast, Russian Empire
- Burial place: Novodevichy Cemetery
- Military career
- Allegiance: Russian Empire; Soviet Union
- Branch: Imperial Russian Army; Soviet Army
- Conflicts: World War I Russian Civil War; World War II

Ivan Timofeyevich Shlyomin (Russian: Иван Тимофеевич Шлёмин, 21 March [O.S. 9 March] 1898 – 10 January 1969) was a Soviet Lieutenant-General of the Red Army during World War II and a Hero of the Soviet Union.

== Biography ==
Ivan Timofeyevich Shlyomin was born in the village of Trunovo in Tver Governorate (today in Kalininsky District in Tver Oblast). In February 1917 he was drafted into the Imperial Russian Army and took part in the First World War as a non-commissioned officer. In September 1918 Shlyomin joined the Red Army as a volunteer and took part in the Russian Civil War as a platoon leader. In 1920 he joined the Communist Party.

Between November 1937 and July 1940, he was Commandant of the Military Academy of the Staff.
Since July 1940 and at the beginning of the Great Patriotic War, Major General Shlyomin was Chief of Staff of the 11th Army. From May 1942 he was Chief of Staff of the Northwestern Front, then he was Chief of Staff of the 1st Guards Army of the Southwestern Front.

From January to April 1943 he commanded the 5th Tank Army on the Southwestern Front. On 19 March 1943, he was promoted to lieutenant general. From April to May 1943 he commanded the 12th Army on the Southwestern Front, from September 1943 to May 1944 the 6th Army on the Southwestern Front and the 3rd Ukrainian Front. From May 1944 to January 1945 he commanded the 46th Army on the 3rd and 2nd Ukrainian Fronts.

The armed forces under his command participated in the Battle of Stalingrad, the Donbass Operation, the Dnieper–Carpathian Offensive, the Bereznegovatoye–Snigirevka Offensive, the Second Jassy–Kishinev Offensive, the Debrecen Operation, the Belgrade Operation and the Battle of Budapest.

On July 1, 1945, Ivan Shlyomin was awarded the title of Hero of the Soviet Union for the skillful organization of the troops and his courage.

After the war he stayed in the army and was released from active service in 1962. Shlyomin died in 1969 and was buried in the Novodevichy Cemetery in Moscow.

== Sources ==
- Generals.dk
- Шлёмин Иван Тимофеевич, warheroes.ru (in Russian)
- Шлёмин Иван Тимофеевич, encyclopedia.mil.ru (in Russian)
- Шлёмин Иван Тимофеевич, divizia-rkka.ru (in Russian)
- Шлемин Иван Тимофеевич, hrono.ru (in Russian)
