= 46th Army =

Soviet Red Army field army

- 46-я армия
- Active: 1 August 1941 – 25 September 1945
- Country: Soviet Union
- Branch: Red Army
- Type: Combined arms
- Size: Field army
- Engagements: World War II; Battle of the Caucasus; Donbas Strategic Offensive; Nikopol-Krivoy Rog Offensive; Second Jassy–Kishinev Offensive; Battle of Debrecen; Budapest Offensive; Vienna Offensive; Prague Offensive

Commanders
- Notable commanders: Konstantin Leselidze; Vasily Glagolev

The 46th Army (Russian: 46-я армия) was a Soviet Red Army field army during World War II. The army was formed in August 1941 and guarded the Turkish border. During the summer of 1942, it fought in the Battle of the Caucasus. During the spring of 1943, the army helped capture Maykop and Krasnodar. During the summer of 1943, it fought in the Donbass Strategic Offensive and the Battle of the Dnieper. During early 1944, it fought in the Nikopol–Krivoi Rog Offensive and the Odessa Offensive. During the summer it fought in the Second Jassy–Kishinev Offensive. The army advanced westward and participated in the Battle of Debrecen and Budapest Offensive during the fall. After the fall of Budapest in February 1945, the army fought in the Vienna Offensive and the Prague Offensive. During the summer of 1945, the army moved to the Odessa Military District and was disbanded in September.

== History ==
=== 1941 ===
The army was formed on 1 August 1941 by order of the commander of the Transcaucasian Military District, dated 23 July 1941 based on the headquarters of the 3rd Rifle Corps. Its first commander was Lieutenant General and Hero of the Soviet Union Stepan Chernyak. On 23 August the army was assigned the task of defending the border with Turkey from the Black Sea to the mountains of Uch-Tapalyar and the coast of the Black Sea to the area of Poti-Sukhumi and transferred to the Transcaucasian Front.

On 1 September 1941 the army comprised the 4th, 9th, 47th Mountain, and the 224th Rifle Divisions, the 51st Fortified Region (УР), the 457th and 647th Corps Artillery Regiments (кап), 547th Howitzer Artillery Regiment of the Reserve of the Supreme High Command (RVGK), 151st, 365th, and 388th Separate Anti-Aircraft Artillery Battalions, plus the 27th Fighter Aviation Division. The 51st and 75th Separate Engineering Battalions and the 7th Separate Armored Train Division were also part of the army.

On 21 December, Major General Alexander Khadeyev took command. The army was transferred to the Caucasian Front on 30 December.

=== 1942 ===
On 28 January 1942, the army was subordinated to the Transcaucasian Military District. Major General Vasily Sergatskov took command of the army on 28 April. On 15 May, the army became part of the Transcaucasian Front's Second Formation. In June 1942, the 3rd Rifle Corps became part of the army. The army was tasked to cover the passes through the Caucasus Mountains from Mamison to Belorechenskoye. On 15 August 1942 the army defended the central passes against German attacks. However, Sergatskov reportedly sent only small forces to observe the passes, allowing German troops to capture them. As a result, Sergatskov was replaced by Major General Konstantin Leselidze on 28 August. On 25 November, the army became part of the front's Black Sea Group.

=== 1943 ===
During January and February 1943, the army fought in the North Caucasian Strategic Offensive. Leselidze was promoted to command 47th Army on 25 January and was replaced by Major General Ivan Rosly. On 29 January, it captured Maykop with the aid of local partisans. The army became part of the North Caucasian Front's Second Formation on 6 February. On 10 February, Rosly was replaced by Major General Alexander Ryzhov. It captured Krasnodar on 12 February in conjunction with the 18th Army. By 11 March, the army reached the Kuban marshes in the Troitsky area, where it went on the defensive. On 22 March, Ryzhov became 47th Army commander and was replaced by Major General Vasily Glagolev the next day. The army was placed in Stavka reserve on 30 March and became part of the Reserve Front on 10 April. On 15 April, it became part of the Steppe Military District. On 1 June, the army became part of the Southwestern Front but was sent back to Stavka reserve on 24 July. On 8 August, the army moved back to the Southwestern Front.

On 24 August 1943 the army participated in the Donbass Strategic Offensive and crossed the Donets River. On 28 August, it was committed south of Zmiiv, but was unable to dislodge German troops from their positions. It became part of the Steppe Front on 11 September. On 2 October, it became part of the Southwestern Front. On 5 October 1943 the army fought a defensive battle to retain bridgeheads across the Dnieper River east of Dniprodzerzhynsk. The army then fought in the Krivoi Rog Offensive and captured Dniproderzhynsk on 25 October. In conjunction with the 8th Guards Army, it captured Dnipropetrovsk on the same day.

=== 1944 ===
In 1944 the army participated in the capture of Right-bank Ukraine. From 30 January, it fought in the Nikopol–Krivoi Rog Offensive. During the offensive, the army captured Apostolove on 5 February. It then turned west towards the Inhulets. It captured Krivoy Rog on 22 February along with the 37th Army and crossed the Inhulets north of Shirokoe. Between 6 and 18 March, the army fought in the Bereznegovatoye–Snigirevka Offensive. The army then fought in the Odessa Offensive. By 14 April 1944, the army had reached the line of Leontina and Palanca at the mouth of the Dniester and seized a bridgehead southeast of Raskayevitsy. On 27 May 1944, Glagolev was transferred to command 31st Army and was replaced by Lieutenant General Ivan Shlemin.

During August and September, the army fought in the Second Jassy–Kishinev Offensive. On 20 August, the army broke through German defences along a 25 mile front. The army captured Akkerman on 22 August and soon broke through to the Cogâlnic River in the rear of the Romanian Third Army. In early September, the army advanced southwards towards Bulgaria in the Giurgiu-Silistra area. It advanced in the direction of Esechioi and Kubrat during the attack into Bulgaria.

The army became part of the 2nd Ukrainian Front on 20 September. From 6 October, the army fought in the Battle of Debrecen. On 8 October, the army attacked with three mobile columns north of Belgrade. 10th Guards Rifle Corps attacked through Vršac and cleared Pančevo by 5 October against weak opposition. The 10th Guards Rifle Corps advanced on Belgrade from the north and northeast. The 31st Guards Rifle Corps advanced through the Voivodina and advanced toward Petrovgrad and the Tisza. 37th Rifle Corps advanced from Timișoara towards Kikinda, destroying elements of the 4th SS Polizei Panzergrenadier Division and Hungarian forces. It advanced towards Szeged and Senta, providing the front's main fighting force in its advance from the south. On the night of 10–11 October, the army captured Szeged. From the end of October, the army fought in the Budapest Offensive. The army was selected to advance towards Budapest through Kecskemét. Kecskemet fell to the army on 1 November. On 1 December, the army included the 10th Guards Rifle Corps (including the 49th, 86th and 109th Guards Rifle Divisions), the 23rd Rifle Corps (including the 68th Guards, 99th and 316th Rifle Divisions) and the 37th Rifle Corps (including the 59th Guards, 108th Guards and 320th Rifle Divisions). The 180th Rifle Division was also part of the army. The 7th Breakthrough Artillery Division provided artillery support for the army. It included the 11th, 9th Guards and 17th Light Artillery Brigades, 25th Howitzer Artillery Brigade, 105th Heavy Howitzer Artillery Brigade and 3rd Mortar Brigade. The 45th Guards Light Artillery Brigade, 92nd Guards Corps Artillery Regiment, 12th and 24th Fighter Anti-Tank Artillery Brigades, 437th Fighter Anti-Tank Artillery Regiment, and 462nd Mortar Regiment provided the rest of the army's artillery support. The 38th Anti-Aircraft Artillery Division was also part of the army and included the 1401st, 1405th, 1709th and 1712th Anti-Aircraft Artillery Regiments. The 991st, 1505th and 1897th Self-Propelled Artillery Regiments and 51st Engineering Brigade provided self-propelled artillery and sapper capability to 46th Army. The army crossed the Danube on the night of 4 December. On 5 December, the army's 37th Rifle Corps attacked positions of the 271st Volksgrenadier Division south of Budapest. 37th Rifle Corps was then heavily counterattacked by the 8th Panzer Division. On the same day, the army advanced towards Csepel Island. The army cleared Ercsi on 9 December and linked up with the 3rd Ukrainian Front at Lake Velence. The army suffered heavy losses during its advance.

On 14 December, the army was transferred to the 3rd Ukrainian Front. On 22 December, Val fell to the army's 2nd Guards Mechanized Corps. The army's 18th Tank Corps linked up with the 6th Guards Tank Army on 24 December, surrounding Budapest.

=== 1945 ===
The 46th Army conducted attacks on Buda until 3 January, when it was directed to prevent breakouts. On 16 January, Shlemin was replaced by Major General Mikhail Filippovsky. After the fall of Budapest on 13 February, the army became part of the 2nd Ukrainian Front on 21 February. On 4 March, Lieutenant General Alexander Petrushevsky became the army commander. From 16 March, the army fought in the Vienna Offensive. It attacked Győr along with the 2nd Guards Mechanized Corps. Other elements of the army attacked Komárno. Both cities were captured by 28 March. The army was transported across the Danube and attacked Vienna from the northeast. On 13 April, the army cleared Vienna of German troops in conjunction with the 6th Guards Tank Army. The army then fought in the Prague Offensive from 6 May. The army reached the line of České Budějovice and Progarten by the end of 11 May. From July to September 1945, the army was relocated to the Odessa Military District and on 25 September 1945 the army was disbanded.

== Subordination ==
- Transcaucasian Front (1st Formation) – 23 August 1941 – 30 December 1941
- Causasian Front – 30 December 1941 – 28 January 1942
- Transcaucasian Military District – 28 January 1942 – 15 May 1942
- Transcaucasian Front (2nd Formation) – 15 May 1942 – 3 March 1943
- Reserve Front – 10 April 1943 – 15 April 1943
- Steppe Military District – April 1943 – 1 July 1943
- STAVKA – 24 July 1943 – 8 August 1943
- Southwestern Front – 8 August 1943 – 20 October 1943
- 3rd Ukrainian Front – 20 October 1943 – 20 September 1944
- 2nd Ukrainian Front 20 September 1944 – 25 September 1945

== Commanders ==
The following officers commanded the army.

- Lieutenant General Stepan Chernyak (July–December 1941)
- Major General Alexander Khadeyev (December 1941 – April 1942)
- Major General Vasily Sergatskov (April–August 1942)
- Lieutenant General Konstantin Leselidze (August 1942 – January 1943)
- Major General Ivan Rosly (January–February 1943)
- Major General Alexander Ryzhov (February–March 1943)
- Major General (Lieutenant General October 1943) Vasily Glagolev (March 1943 – May 1944)
- Lieutenant General Ivan Shlemin (May 1944 – January 1945)
- Major General Mikhail Filippovsky (January–March 1945)
- Lieutenant General Alexander Petrushevsky (March–September 1945)
