= 59th Guards Motor Rifle Division =

Motor rifle division of the Soviet military

The 59th Guards Kramatorsk Order of Red Banner, Order of Suvorov, Order of Bogdan Khmelnitsky Motor-Rifle Division of the Soviet Union's Red Army was initially formed near Krasnodar in March 1942 as the 197th Rifle Division (2nd formation). On the division's formation Colonel (from 14.10.1942 major-general) M. I. Zaporozhchenko took command, who stayed with the division until February 1943. Its second commander was Major-General G. P. Karamyshev from February 1943 up to the end of the war.

On the formation of the 197th Rifle Division the major subunits were the 828th, 862nd, 889th Rifle, 261st Artillery Regiments, as well as other support units. Upon becoming Guards the designations of the subunits changed to the 176th, 179th, and 183rd Guards Rifle and 127 Guards Artillery Regiments, and 66th Guards Independent Sapper Battalion.

== Combat history ==
- Until July 1942 the division was part of the 7th Reserve Army of the North Caucasus Military District
- From July 1942 it joined the 5th Reserve Army
- On 10 July 1942 the 5th Army of the STAVKA Reserve was redesignated as the 63rd Army of the Stalingrad Front
- From 28 September 1942 assigned to the Don Front
- From 22 October 1942 the division served with the Southwestern Front during the Battle of Stalingrad

The division was assigned initially to the 63rd Army (since November 1942 the 1st Guards Army, and since December 1942 3rd Guard Army), 6th Army, and eventually the 46th Army within which it ended the war.

The division saw combat for the first time during the Battle of Stalingrad from July to December 1942 as part of the 63rd Army (which became the 1st Guards Army on 1 November 1942). During fierce fighting in the Veshenskaya area, parts of the division along with other Soviet units repelled the approach of the German forces. Having forced the Don river in the El'yanskoye area, the division seized a bridgehead which was subsequently used to stage a Soviet counter-attack. In these engagements the division destroyed up to 2,000 enemy troops, and much military equipment and weapons. The division participated in Operation Little Saturn between 16 and 30 December 1942.

The division, in conjunction with other formations of the 1st Guards Army (which was renamed the 3rd Guards Army on 5 December 1942) traversed over 200 kilometers, liberated 170 settlements, including the city of Voroshilovgrad (now Lugansk) on 14 February 1943, and captured around 8,000 pieces of enemy equipment. For its courage, tenacity, and heroism the division was honored and renamed the 59th Guards Rifle Division on 3 January. The division's next combat participation was in the Donbass Offensive and the Barvenkov-Pavlograd Offensive operation (13.08 – 22.09.1943) in the Don basin and liberating the Donbass region. For its efforts in capturing the city of Kramatorsk on 6 September 1943 it was awarded the honorific name 'Kramatorsk' on 8 September 1943 by the Order of High Command No.9 on the same day During the liberation of Kramatorsk the division was supported by the 5th Guards Independent Motor-Rifle Brigade and the 243rd Independent Tank Regiment

The division also supported clearing the city of Zaporozhye of the enemy on 14 October 1943, in conjunction with other units. For its exemplary battle skills and valour the division was awarded the Order of the Red Banner on 14 October 1943.

During the 1944 Nikopolsk–Krivorozhsk Offensive (30.01 - 29.02) the division fought first as part of 3rd Guards Army, and then as part of 6th Army together with the 61st Guards Rifle Division, 203rd Rifle, and the 320th Rifle Division divisions of the 34th Guards Rifle Corps. For the skilful performance of combat tasks and courage of the division's troops it was awarded the Order of Suvorov, 2nd degree, on 13 February 1944.

In the following months, the division was part of the attack toward Odessa, and was the first formation to enter the city on 10 April 1944 despite the bad road conditions, crossing the river lines of the Ingulets, Ingul, and Southern Bug rivers in the process. The division was awarded the Order of Bogdan Khmelnitsky, 2nd degree on 20 April 1944 for its courage and heroism in clearing the city of Odessa. In the summer of the same year the division, as part of the 46th Army (with which it remained to the end of the war), 3rd Ukrainian Front, the division participated in the Yassy-Kishinev Offensive operation. As part of the offensive the division broke through the Wehrmacht defense to the east of Bender, fighting on the left shore of lake Kitay, and cut off the withdrawal route to parts of German III Army Corps. Pursuing the retreating German troops, the division crossed the Soviet-Romanian border (as defined by the Molotov–Ribbentrop Pact) on August, 28th near the city of Reni, 25 kilometres to the East of Galați. On 8 September, the Bulgarian border was also crossed as the division was transferred to the 2nd Ukrainian Front for the Belgrade Offensive (28.09 - 20.10). From October 1944 to February 1945 the division took part in the Battle of Debrecen and the initial phase of the Budapest Offensive, the Kecskemét-Budapest Offensive operation. During this operation the commander of the 179th Rifle Regiment, T.N. Artem’yev was awarded Hero of Soviet Union for heroic performance in combat.

=== 1945 ===
The last stages of the division's combat path during World War II was the participation in the Vienna Offensive's Győr Offensive operation (Russian: Дьерская наступательная), during which the division's active and resolute actions to the north of Vienna led to the Red Army's capture of the Austrian capital on 13 April 1945. The division's combat operations finished in the Freistadt area, north of Linz, in May 1945.
For their performance during the Great Patriotic War over 4,000 soldiers were awarded awards and medals, and 19 given the Gold Star of the Hero of the Soviet Union.

=== Battle honours ===
- 1942 Battle of Stalingrad Stalingrad Front
- 1942 Battle of Stalingrad Don Front
- 1942 Southwestern Front
- 1943 3rd Ukrainian Front Donbass
- 1943 4th Ukrainian Front Yassy-Kishinev
- 1944 2nd Ukrainian Front Belgorod

Voroshilovgrad, Donbass, Zaporozh'ye, and Nikopol' - Krivoy-Rog, Odessa and Iasi-Kishinev operations, the Battle of Romania and Bulgaria, and finally in the Battle of Debrecen, and the Budapest and Vienna operations.

== Cold War era ==
After the war the division became the 59th Guards Motor Rifle Division (GMRD) in 1957. It joined the 14th Guards Army and remained at Tiraspol for the next two decades.

In 1974 the 14th Combined Arms Army became a part of the Odessa Military District, which had been awarded the Order of the Red Banner in 1968.
The Army headquarters was in city of Tiraspol, with the 59th GMRD garrisoned in the city as well. In December, 1972, for excellence in protection of Soviet territory and high marks in combat and political preparedness, the division was awarded the Minister of Defence of the USSR's Pendant for Courage and Military Valour.

=== Order of battle, late 1980s ===
- 176th Guards Motor Rifle Regiment (Tiraspol): 26 Т-64; 18 BTR (12 BTR-70, 6 BTR-60), 6 BMP (4 BMP-2, 2 BRM-1К); 12 - 2S1 "Gvozdika", 12 - 2S12 "Sani" portee mortars; 3 - 1V18, 1 - 1V19, 1 PRP-3; 3 Р-145B, 1 PU-12; 1 МТ-55А
- 179th Guards Motor Rifle Regiment (Tiraspol): 22 Т-64; 21 BMP (6 BMP-2, 12 BMP-1, 3 BRM-1К), 13 BTR-70; 10 - 2S1 "Gvozdika", 2 BМ-21 "Grad"; I BMP-1KSh, 1 PRP-3, 1 RKhM, 1 RKhM-4; 5 Р-145BМ, 1 PU-12; 1 МТ-55А
- 183rd Guards Motor Rifle Regiment (Tiraspol): 20 Т-64; 140 BTR (129 BTR-70, II BTR-60), 6 BMP (6 BMP-2, 2 BRM-1К); 12 - 2S1 "Gvozdika", 12 - 2S12 "Sani"; 5 BMP-1KSh, 1 PRP-3, 1 RKhM, 3 BREM-2, 3 R-145BМ, 1 PU-12; 1 МТU-20
- 356th Tank Regiment (Tiraspol): 87 Т-64; 16 BMP (14 BMP-2, 2 BRM-1К); 1 - 2S1 "Gvozdika"; 5 BMP-1KSh, 1 PRP-3, 3 RKhM, 2 Р-145BМ, 1 PU-12; 3 МТU-20
- 328th Guards Self-Propelled Artillery Regiment (Tiraspol): 34 - 2SЗ "Akatsiya"; 12 BМ-21 "Grad"; 3 - 1V18, 1 - 1V19, 3 PRP-3, 2 Р-145BМ, and 1 BTR-70
- 1162nd Anti-Aircraft Rocket Regiment (Tiraspol): 6 PU-12, 3 Р-145BМ
- 1299th Independent Anti-Aircraft Artillery Battalion (Tiraspol): 15 МТ-LBT
- 102nd Independent Reconnaissance Battalion (Tiraspol): 17 BMP (10 BMP-1, 7BRM-1К), 6 BTR-70
- 201st Independent Signal Battalion (Tiraspol): 11 Р-145BМ, 3 Р-156BTR
- 66th Independent Engineer-Sapper Battalion (Tiraspol): 3 UR-67
- 896th Independent Material Support Battalion
- 275th Independent Repair Battalion

On 19 November 1990 the division had the following equipment:

- 155 Т-64 tanks
- 180 BTRs (169 BTR-70, 17 BTR-60);
- 66 BMPs (38 BMP-2, 12 BMP-1, 16 BRM-1К);
- 82 SP guns (46 - 2S1 "Gvozdika", 36 - 2SЗ "Akatsiya");
- 2 D-30 towed guns;
- 36 Mortars (2S12 "Sani");
- 14 MRLs BМ-21 "Grad"

=== 1990s ===
Two former battalions of the 179th Guards Motor-Rifle Regiment (now independent), located at Dubăsari and Bender, have been stationed in Moldova's unrecognized breakaway region of Transnistria as part of the OGRF since May 1996.

On 1 June 1997 the 59th Guards Motor Rifle Division was reorganised as the 8th Guards Independent Motor-Rifle Brigade with four motor-rifle battalions, one tank battalion, two artillery battalions, and an anti-tank battalion plus other combat support and support units. From 1 December 1999 two motor-rifle battalions were officially removed from the Russian Ground Forces organisation and transferred to the Combined Peacekeeping Forces command.

=== 8th Guards Motor Rifle Brigade ===
The reorganised 8th Guards Motor Rifle Brigade comprised the following units:

- 82nd Independent Guards Motor Rifle Battalion;
- 113th Independent Guards Motor Rifle Battalion;
- 145th Independent Guards Motor Rifle Battalion;
- 238th Independent Guards Motor Rifle Battalion;
- 48th Independent Tank Battalion;
- 896th Independent Battalion of Material Maintenance.

In December 2002 the brigade was disbanded, and the remaining personnel, numbering 5,719 effectives were absorbed into the Peacekeeping Forces command.

As a result of reduction in the strength of the Operational Group (commander General-Major Boris Sergeyev) the remaining strength as of 2006 is about 1,000 - 1,500 troops, and comprises:

- 82nd and 113th Separate Peacekeeping Motor-Rifle battalions
- Independent security and support battalion
- A helicopter detachment
- Several small administrative detachments

== Sources ==
- Soldat.ru
- Keith E. Bonn (ed.), Slaughterhouse : The Handbook of the Eastern Front, Aberjona Press, Bedford, PA, 2005
- Chemelev, Alexander (1983). Прошла с боями [Tested in combat] (in Russian). Kishinev: Kartya moldovenyaske.
- Glantz, D.M., Soviet Military Deception in the Second World War, Frank Cass, London, 1989
