= 297th Rifle Division =

- Active: 1st formation: July 1941 – July 1942; 2nd formation: July 1943 – 1945
- Country: Soviet Union
- Branch: Red Army
- Type: Rifle division
- Engagements: World War II
- Decorations: 2nd formation: Order of the Red Banner; Order of Bogdan Khmelnitsky
- Battle honours: 2nd formation: Kirovograd; Slavyansk

The 297th Rifle Division (Russian: 297-я стрелковая дивизия) was an infantry division of the Soviet Union's Red Army during World War II, formed twice. Its first formation was formed in the summer of 1941 and destroyed during Case Blue, the German summer offensive towards Stalingrad, in 1942. Reformed in the summer of 1943, the division's second formation fought in combat for the rest of the war before being disbanded postwar.

== History ==
=== First formation ===
The division began forming on 2 July 1941 at Lubny in the Kharkov Military District. Its basic order of battle included the 1055th, 1057th, and the 1059th Rifle Regiments, as well as the 824th Artillery Regiment. On 12 August, the 297th was assigned to the Southwestern Front's 38th Army. In early September, the division absorbed elements of the Kremenchug Militia Division, from which it may have received mountain and infantry reconnaissance companies. The division escaped from the Kiev pocket, and after October 1941 became part of the 21st Army, fighting in the Kursk-Belgorod area. During the 21st Army's attack in the Second Battle of Kharkov, the 297th was in a secondary sector. The division and its army were able to avoid being destroyed in the Kharkov pocket but were weakened. In June, the 297th was forced to retreat by the German summer offensive, Case Blue, but suffered heavy losses and was disbanded on 15 July.

=== Second formation ===
The division was reformed on 25 July 1943 from the 253rd Rifle Brigade, part of the Southwestern Front's 33rd Rifle Corps, and included the same basic order of battle as the previous division. The 33rd Corps was assigned to the 8th Guards Army soon after. In late August, the division was transferred to the 3rd Guards Army but in October returned to the 8th Guards Army. In November the 33rd Rifle Corps and the 297th were sent into the 3rd Ukrainian Front reserve. In early 1944 the division became part of the 7th Guards Army, but was withdrawn to the reserve again in March, this time in the 2nd Ukrainian Front. In April the 297th became part of the 27th Guards Rifle Corps, which became part of the 27th Army in May. From June to September the corps was in the front reserve.

Beginning in late fall, the 297th fought in the siege of Budapest, during which it was transferred back and forth between front reserves and various armies. Between October 1944 and March 1945, the division served in the 53rd Army and the 7th Guards Army, and in the 37th Rifle Corps and the 18th Guards Rifle Corps in front reserves. The 297th had significantly more troops than the average division fighting in Pest (c. 6,000 men against an average of c. 4,000 for other divisions) and consequently was used as a spearhead formation in the capture of the east bank of Budapest.

The 297th fought in the Vienna Offensive, at the beginning of which it was assigned to the 46th Army's 68th Rifle Corps. The division was disbanded between 1945 and 1946 in the Odessa Military District or the Tauric Military District.

== In popular culture ==
The 297th Rifle Division is featured extensively in Multi-Man Publishing's 2011 Historical Advanced Squad Leader module Festung Budapest.
