= Vereb =

- Location of Fejér county in Hungary

- Location of Vereb
- Coordinates: 47.31867°N 18.61802°E
- Country: Hungary
- County: Fejér

Area
  - Total: 22.32 km^{2} (8.62 sq mi)

Population (2004)
  - Total: 803
  - Density: 35.97/km^{2} (93.2/sq mi)
- Time zone: UTC+1 (CET)
  - Summer (DST): UTC+2 (CEST)
- Postal code: 2477
- Area code: 22
- Website: www.vereb.hu

Vereb is a village in Fejér county, Hungary.
