= Battle of Debrecen =

1944 WWII conflict in Hungary

Debrecen Offensive Operation
- Part of the Eastern Front of World War II
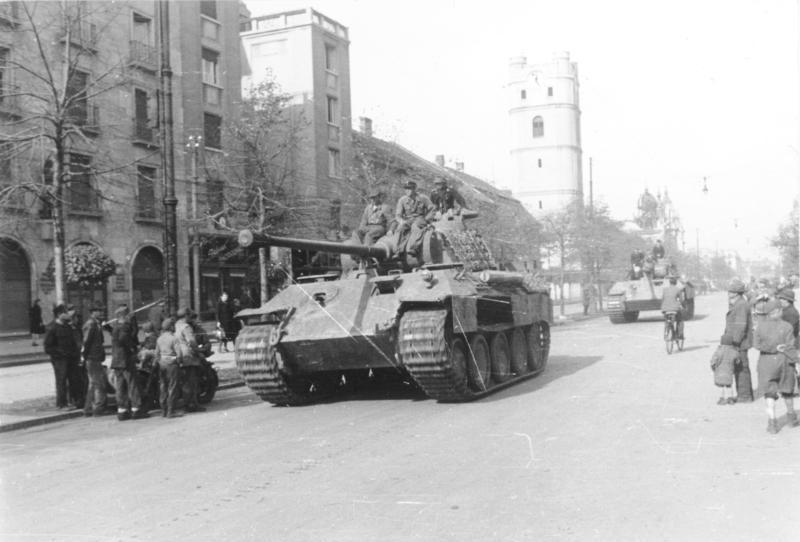
- German Panther tank in the city of Debrecen in October 1944
Date	6–29 October 1944
Location	Nagyvárad / Debrecen / Nyíregyháza, Kingdom of Hungary
Result	Inconclusive

Belligerents
Germany; Hungary (Note: GONU after Operation Panzerfaust.)	Soviet Union; Romania

Commanders and leaders
(Nazi Germany) Johannes Friessner (Nazi Germany) M. Fretter-Pico	(Soviet Union) Rodion Malinovsky (Soviet Union) Issa Pliyev; Nicolae Macici; Gheorghe Avramescu

Units involved
(Nazi Germany) Army Group South: (Nazi Germany) 6th Army; (Kingdom of Hungary (1920–1946)) 2nd Army; (Kingdom of Hungary (1920–1946)) 3rd Army; (Nazi Germany) 8th Army	(Soviet Union) 2nd Ukrainian Front: 7th Guards Army; 27th Army; 40th Army; 46th Army; 53rd Army; 6th Guards Tank Army; CMG Pliyev; CMG Gorshkov; (Kingdom of Romania) 1st Army; (Kingdom of Romania) 4th Army

Strength
1 October: 31 divisions and brigades (Nazi Germany) 240,952 men (Kingdom of Hungary (1920–1946)) 190,000 men 293 tanks and assault guns 3,500 guns and mortars 741 aircraft	1 October: 84 divisions and brigades (Soviet Union) 698,200 men (Kingdom of Romania) 167,306 men 825 tanks and assault guns 10,238 guns and mortars 1,216 aircraft

Casualties and losses
(Nazi Germany) ~15,000 killed or wounded (Kingdom of Hungary (1920–1946)) 20,000 killed or wounded Total: 53,000 men (including ~18,000 POW) ~200 tanks lost 490 guns lost (Note: The German official history (Das Deutsche Reich und der Zweite Weltkrieg, printed 2007), Volume 8 (p. 876), states casualties (including wounded) as 15,000 Germans, 20,000 Hungarians and notes that 18,000 Axis troops were taken as prisoner-of-war. Armored losses are estimated as 200, and artillery losses are given as 490 Axis pieces.)	(Soviet Union) 19,713 killed or missing and 64,297 wounded or sick (Kingdom of Romania) 33,500 killed or wounded (Note: This figure for Romanian losses is apparently a subtraction of the 84,010 Soviet losses mentioned in When Titans Clashed from the figure for overall Soviet and Romanian losses of 117,360 mentioned in Volume 8 of Das Deutsche Reich und der Zweite Weltkrieg. The figures from this volume appear to be taken from Ungváry's A magyar honvédség a második világháborúban (2005). Apart from the fact that Ungváry's work represents a Hungarian view of the battle, it is also of interest that total Romanian losses for operations in Hungary during the period 8 October 1944 – 15 January 1945 (a considerably longer period than the Debrecen Operation itself) are given as 42,700 in Axworthy's The Romanian Army of World War 2 (p. 23).); Total: 117,360 men (including 5,073 POW); ~500 tanks lost 1,656 guns lost

The Battle of Debrecen, called by the Red Army the Debrecen Offensive Operation, was a battle taking place from 6 to 29 October 1944 on the Eastern Front in Hungary during World War II.

The offensive was conducted by the 2nd Ukrainian Front under Marshal Rodion Malinovsky. It was opposed by General Maximilian Fretter-Pico's German Sixth Army (II formation) and the allied Hungarian VII Army Corps of Army Group South Ukraine

The German and Hungarian units were forced to retreat some 160 km and opposed the 2nd Ukrainian Front, which had Debrecen as its strategic objective.

== Background ==
In the wake of the coup d'état of 23 August 1944, Germany's former ally, Romania declared war on Germany and its ally Hungary. The subsequent drive of Soviet General Fedor Tolbukhin's 3rd Ukrainian Front into Romania destroyed any semblance of an organised defensive line. On 8 September, Bulgaria, another former German ally, declared war on Germany. By this time, Tolbukhin, aided by the 2nd Ukrainian Front under Malinovsky had destroyed thirteen Axis divisions, taking over 100,000 prisoners. Both Malinovsky and Tolbukhin were promoted to Marshal of the Soviet Union for this on 10 and 12 September, respectively.

These developments had opened up a 650 kilometres (400 miles) gap in Friessner's Army Group. On 24 September 1944, Friessner's Army Group South Ukraine was redesignated Army Group South. General Fretter-Pico's Sixth Army formed the nucleus of Friessner's force, along with the Hungarian Second Army. The German-Hungarian force was designated Armeegruppe Fretter-Pico. Meanwhile, the Soviet forces were worn down by the Second Jassy–Kishinev Offensive and the Belgrade Offensive, and also had to contend with logistical difficulties caused by the different railway gauge used in Romania.

== Prelude ==
Fearing encirclement, Army Group South Ukraine commander Generaloberst Johannes Friessner requested Hitler's permission to withdraw. Hitler refused, but promised additional forces for Friessner's army group. Hitler ordered Friessner to start a new offensive with the goal of destroying of two of Malinovsky's Armies, the 27th Army and the 6th Guards Tank Army. In addition, he was ordered to retake two vital passes in the Southern Carpathians.

On 14 September 1944, Malinovsky, in conjunction with the 3rd Ukrainian Front, launched the Belgrade Offensive. Friessner had been concentrating troops for his own planned offensive, and Malinovsky's 2nd Ukrainian Front ran into heavy resistance. After a week of fruitless attacks, Malinovsky called off his offensive and ordered the exhausted 6th Guards Tank Army, and the Cavalry Mechanized Groups (CMGs) under Issa Pliyev (7th Mechanized Corps, 4th Guards Cavalry Corps, and 6th Guards Cavalry Corps, with 389 tanks and assault guns) and Sergey Gorshkov (5th Guards Cavalry Corps and 23rd Tank Corps, with 146 tanks and assault guns), to the area near Oradea.

By the end of September 1944, both Malinovsky and Friessner had received new orders. Malinovsky was now ordered to attack towards Budapest from the salient to the south around Arad. He was to use the 46th Soviet Army and the 1st Romanian Army, with CMG Pliyev as the exploitation force in case of a successful breakthrough. The remainder of Malinovsky's forces, including the 6th Guards Tank Army, 53rd Army, and CMG Gorshkov, were to attack from the north, near Oradea, towards Debrecen. The plan was for the two spearheads to link up and encircle the German forces. Meanwhile, Friessner's orders included an attack from Oradea with Armeegruppe Fretter-Pico.

== Operation begins ==
The 2nd Ukrainian Front operation began on 6 October 1944, with Malinovsky's southern pincer attacking near Arad, and slicing through the Hungarian Third Army. The spearhead of the southern 2nd Ukrainian Front pincer, followed by the Cavalry Mechanized Group Pliyev, had advanced almost sixty kilometres within the first 24 hours.

The attack by the northern 2nd Ukrainian Front pincer ran into difficulty quickly, colliding with the 1st Panzer Division and 23rd Panzer Divisions of the German III Panzer Corps. By the end of the day, the northern pincer had advanced only ten kilometres.

Reacting quickly, Fretter-Pico ordered the 76th Infantry Division into the forward line near Oradea. This freed up the 23rd Panzer Division to move south to counter the breakthrough near Arad. The German Panzer Division Feldherrnhalle 1, refitting at Mezőkövesd, was moved into action to guard potential crossing points on the Tisza River against the advancing 2nd Ukrainian Front units.

By the evening of 7 October 1944, the 2nd Ukrainian Front southern pincer had advanced further towards the Tisza River. Meanwhile, the northern pincer was still stalled near Oradea. In this area the German-Hungarian forces had managed to halt several flanking attempts by the 6th Guards Tank Army.

== Across the Tisza ==
By 10 October, Malinovsky's troops occupied several bridgeheads on the western bank of the Tisza River, and elements of the 46th Army and the 18th Tank Corps were driving on Kecskemét, only 70 kilometres from Budapest. Malinovsky, however, had to redistribute some of these forces to support the advance of Pliyev's group on the other side of the Tisza. The remaining 2nd Ukrainian Front troops of this spearhead were attacked by the Hungarian cavalry and German anti-aircraft troops and forced to retreat to the Tisza on 11 October. The same day, Hungarian (1st Armored and 23rd Infantry Divisions) counter-attacks against the 2nd Ukrainian Front's 243rd Rifle Division at the Mindszent bridgehead became so dire that the Romanian VII Corps was rushed to Mindszent to reinforce the bridgehead's defense.

Subsequently, the Romanian 2nd and 4th Infantry Divisions took over 2nd Ukrainian Front bridgeheads on the Tisza below Szolnok. The bridgehead of the 4th Division was attacked on 19 October by the Hungarian 1st Cavalry and 1st Infantry Divisions, which the 4th Division held back until hit on the right flank by the German 24th Panzer Division, 4th SS Panzergrenadier Division, and the 503rd Heavy Tank Battalion. The right flank of the Romanian 4th Division caved in and the German armor drove behind the division, cutting it off from the Tisza River and eventually forcing its surrender by 20 October. On 25 October, three Hungarian divisions (1st Cavalry, 1st Infantry and 20th Infantry) attacked the Romanian 2nd Division in its bridgehead. The Romanian 2nd Division panicked and pulled back across the Tisza River. This Hungarian success, however, was not repeated when a third assault was made during 26–29 October against the Romanian 19th Infantry Division's bridgehead at Alpar.

On 8 October 1944, Cavalry Mechanized Group Pliyev shifted its attack northeastward. Pliyev's group advanced quickly along the major highway between Szolnok to Debrecen. At Hajdúszoboszló, the group's lead units, the 9th Guards Mechanized and the 6th Guards Cavalry Corps, ran into elements of 23rd Panzer Division moving south to halt the southern pincer. On 9 October 1944, with support from the 5th Air Army, Pliyev's group took the town. The Germans fell back to Debrecen, and began entrenching to the southeast of the city.

== Continued battle ==
On 11 October 1944, elements of Pliyev's 4th Guards Cavalry Corps reached the outskirts of Debrecen. Although this corps was cut off from the main Soviet force, Pliyev had managed to avoid encirclement. Under the 6th Guards Tank Army's attacks, the front line near Oradea was steadily pushed back, in what historian Earl F. Ziemke described as "one of the wildest tank battles of the war". By 12 October, Pliyev's group had already lost some 200 armored fighting vehicles. By 14 October 1944, the line had fallen back 14 kilometres (8.7 miles), with Oradea occupied by Malinovsky's forces. Further to the north, a new crisis threatened Fretter-Pico. The 4th Ukrainian Front had finally attacked, falling on Otto Wöhler's German Eighth Army.

Malinovsky now linked up with Cavalry Mechanized Group Pliyev. Forcing their way through the Axis resistance, during 19–20 October three Romanian divisions (2nd and 3rd Mountain, plus the Tudor Vladimirescu Division) assaulted and seized Debrecen as part of the Soviet 27th Army's assault on the right flank of the 6th Guards Tank Army. On 22 October 1944, Pliyev's group captured Nyíregyháza. The line of communications of Wöhler's Eighth Army was severed. German Colonel-General Friessner had ordered Wöhler to disengage and fall back northwest of Nyíregyháza and attempt to form a defensive line. This move was already in progress when Cavalry Mechanized Group Pliyev cut Wöhler's lines of communications.

To address the developing threat, the German 23rd and 1st Panzer Divisions, led by the Tiger IIs of the 503rd Heavy Panzer Battalion attacked to the east. Paul Klatt's 3rd Mountain Division, the 15th Infantry Division, and the 8th SS Cavalry Division Florian Geyer formed the forces attacking to the west. On 24 October 1944, forces of the 23rd Panzer Division reached Nagykálló, which was already occupied by the German 3rd Mountain Division.

On 26 October, the 23rd Panzer Division recaptured Nyíregyháza. Wöhler began moving his Eighth Army out through the escape route created through Nyíregyháza. By the 28th, Wöhler's army had escaped encirclement. By this time, Pliyev's forces destroyed most of their vehicles and heavy weapons and marched south to reach the Soviet lines. Despite the attempted destruction by German forces, Pliyev's Cavalry-Mechanized Group was back in action by 10 November during the Soviet drive to Szeged.

== Aftermath ==
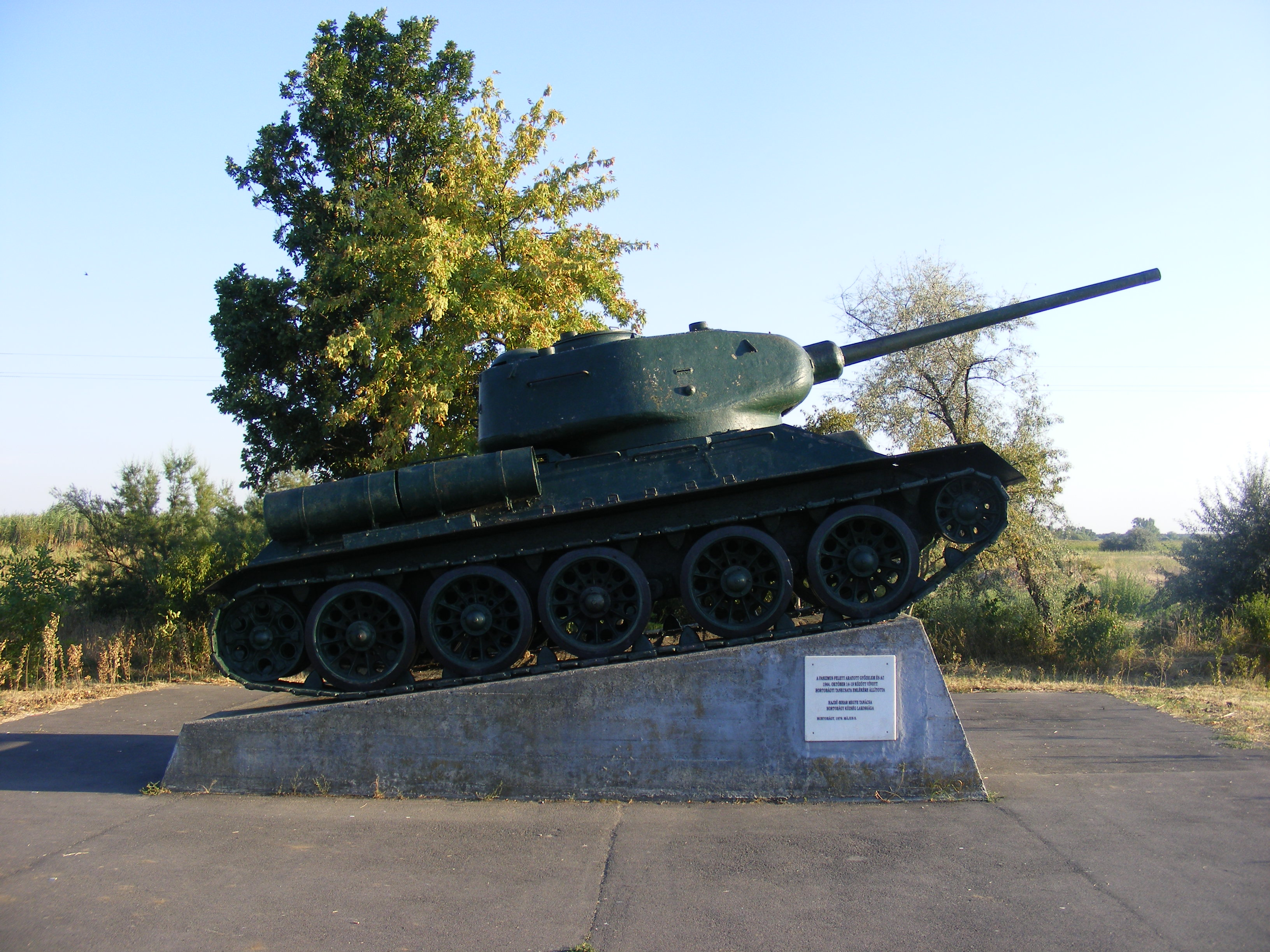
Battle of Debrecen memorial

Three corps of Malinovsky's 2nd Ukrainian Front had sustained significant losses in the fighting and the intended rapid 2nd Ukrainian Front assault on Budapest had been delayed. The Nyíregyháza counter-attack was the last time that German forces were to defeat a full-strength Red Army force on even terms. By pinching off the breakthrough exploitation group of the 2nd Ukrainian Front offensive, the Germans were able to re-establish a stable front line position, and thus, prevent the 2nd Ukrainian Front's advance from becoming a catastrophe for Wöhler. The German success was, however, short-lived as Nyíregyháza was captured by the Red Army on 30 October, and another powerful Red Army offensive opened to the south with Budapest again being its objective, with the Soviets reaching the area of the Hungarian capital on 7 November 1944. The city of Debrecen fell on 20 October after two Romanian divisions, the First Romanian infantry division and the Tudor Vladimirescu Division captured the city despite numerous German and Hungarian counter-attacks to stop their advance. As a result of their victory, the Romanian Tudor Vladimirescu division was renamed on Stalin's request the Tudor Vladimirescu–Debrecen division.

The Debrecen operation saw the forces of the 2nd Ukrainian Front advance anywhere from 60 to 120 miles further west into Hungary, leaving the 2nd and 3rd Ukrainian Fronts in position to renew the offensive towards Budapest. The tank battle at Debrecen itself had drawn the German Panzer units away from defending the approaches to Budapest. Finally, the Red Army thrust occupied the eastern third of Hungary, clearing the obstacle of the Transylvanian Alps and denying their use as a winter defense position for the Axis forces.

== See also ==
- Hungary during World War II
- Romania during World War II
- Topographic map of the Debrecen area
