= 320th Rifle Division =

320th Rifle Division (September 24, 1941 – May 19, 1942) 320th Rifle Division (August 5, 1942 – 1946)
- Active: 1941–1946
- Country: Soviet Union
- Branch: Red Army
- Type: Infantry
- Size: Division
- Engagements: Crimean Campaign; Battle of the Kerch Peninsula; Battle of the Caucasus; Donbass Strategic Offensive; Nikopol–Krivoi Rog Offensive; First Jassy–Kishinev Offensive; Second Jassy–Kishinev Offensive; Siege of Budapest; Vienna Offensive
- Decorations: Order of the Red Banner (2nd formation); Order of Suvorov 2nd class (2nd formation)
- Battle honours: Yenakiyevo (2nd formation)

Commanders
- Notable commanders: Lt. Col. Grigorii Naumovich Regblat; Col. Mikhail Dmitrievich Nechaev; Col. Aleksei Nikolasvich Zazhigalov; Maj. Gen. Ivan Ivanovich Shvygin; Col. Yosif Zakarovich Burik

The 320th Rifle Division was formed in September 1941, as a standard Red Army rifle division, based on an existing division of militia. This formation was devastated in the Kerch Peninsula in May 1942, and officially disbanded before the end of the month. A second division began forming in the Transcaucasus in August, and served for the duration in the southern regions of the Soviet-German front. It distinguished itself in the liberation of Yenakiyevo in March 1943, but also suffered massive losses, including the death of the division's commanding officer, along the Dniestr River in May 1944. A substantially rebuilt division soldiered on through the Balkans, ending the war near Vienna.

== 1st Formation ==
The 1st Crimea Rifle Division began forming on August 20, 1941, at Feodosiya. On September 11 it was declared as being "ready for the front" and was assigned to 51st Army of Crimean Front, defending the northern Crimea. Since Feodosiya is in the south of the peninsula, the division remained in the Army reserve. On September 24 the division was redesignated as the 320th Rifle Division. Its basic order of battle was as follows:

- 476th Rifle Regiment
- 478th Rifle Regiment
- 481st Rifle Regiment
- 985th Artillery Regiment

The division was a "sister" to the 321st Rifle Division. Both were still organizing in late September when the German 11th Army broke into the Crimea from the north, and the remnants of the 320th had to be evacuated across the Kerch Strait to the North Caucasus on November 16. On January 1, 1942, Lt. Col. Grigorii Naumovich Regblat was appointed to command the division temporarily; he was replaced two weeks later by Col. Mikhail Dmitrievich Nechaev, who would remain in command for the duration of the 1st Formation. During January and February 1942 the division was rebuilt in the North Caucasus Military District, and in March returned to the Kerch Peninsula following the successful Soviet amphibious landings there. It was all for naught, as the German forces launched their Operation Bustard Hunt on May 8. At this time the division was part of 47th Army, and like most of its army it was chopped to pieces in one of the most lopsided German victories of the war. On May 19 the 320th was officially disbanded in Crimean Front.

== 2nd Formation ==
A new division began forming on August 5, 1942 at Leninakan, Armenia, in the Transcaucasus Military District. Its order of battle remained the same as the 1st Formation. Its first commander was Col. Aleksei Nikolasvich Zazhigalov, and he would hold command until May 19, 1943. On the day it began forming it was ordered to be assigned to a new 66th Army that was to be formed in the Terek River valley, but in the event this plan was dropped and the 66th was formed elsewhere. By the end of August the 320th was assigned to the 45th Army in the Transcaucasus Front, on the southern borders of the USSR and away from the fighting fronts. In October it was assigned to the Northern Group of this front, but remained in reserve until the end of the year. As the German forces withdrew northwards following their defeat at Stalingrad, the division followed up in the 44th Army, liberating the town of Azov on February 7, 1943. By the end of the month the 320th, along with its army, was transferred to Southern Front.

Colonel Zazhigalov was replaced by Col. Pyotr Nikonovich Kribulin on May 20. In July, Kribulin was succeeded briefly by another colonel before Maj. Gen. Ivan Ivanovich Shvygin took command, which he would hold until he was killed in action on May 13, 1944. Also in July the division went into the Reserve of the Supreme High Command, then returned to the front at the end of August, still in Southern Front, but now under command of 9th Rifle Corps in 5th Shock Army.

During the Donbass Strategic Offensive, Southern Front finally broke through the German defenses along the Mius River and began exploiting into the Donbass region. The city of Yenakiyevo was liberated on September 3, and the 320th, for its efforts, was given this name as an honorific:

"ORDZHONIKIDZE (YENAKIYEVO)... 320th Rifle Division (Maj. Gen. Ivan Ivanovich Shvigin)... The troops who participated in the liberation of the Donbass, during which they captured Ordzhonikidze and other cities, by order of the Supreme High Command on September 8, 1943, and a commendation in Moscow, are given a salute of 20 artillery volleys out of 224 guns."

When Southern Front became 4th Ukrainian Front on October 20, the division, still in 9th Corps, was reassigned to 28th Army. That army was shifted to 3rd Ukrainian Front in February 1944, but the 320th, now in 10th Guards Rifle Corps, found itself back in 5th Shock Army in March, which by this time was in 3rd Ukrainian Front. During this period, the division's antitank battalion was completely reequipped with ZIS-3 76mm cannon, replacing the 45mm pieces it had had previously.

== Disaster on the Dniestr ==
On April 1 the 320th was decorated for its services with the Order of the Red Banner. By May, the Soviet offensive to break into Romanian territory towards the cities of Iași (Jassy) and Chișinău (Kishinev) had bogged down along the Dniestr River. Units of 3rd and 4th Ukrainian Fronts had seized bridgeheads at several points in April, but they were shallow, marshy, and, in some cases, untenable against serious attack. While in 5th Shock Army, the 320th had crossed the river at Cioburciu, southeast of Tiraspol. Due to several reorganizations, the division was now in 37th Rifle Corps of 46th Army on May 12, holding a bridgehead between 1 – 2 km deep and 3 km wide in low-lying marshlands, with the Germans in possession of the high ground. General Shvygin was in the bridgehead with most of his soldiers.

Before dawn on May 13, a powerful 50-minute artillery preparation struck Shvygin's defenses, followed by an attack by elements of German 6th Army's XXIX and XXX Army Corps. The division beat off the first reconnaissance-in-force, but after a further bombardment the full assault began at 0700 hrs. 478th and 481st Rifle Regiments, in the front line, began to give ground grudgingly. The attackers worked through the boundary between the two regiments and reached the river, breaking the bridgehead into two segments. By 0800 hrs. the defenders found themselves literally with their backs to the river, with no room to maneuver and increasingly vulnerable to enemy fire. At 0930 hrs. the river crossing was destroyed, and the defenders were effectively encircled. During the next four hours, while attempting to defend themselves, the rifle regiments were destroyed, with only a few stragglers managing to swim the river. General Shvygin and most of his staff were killed while directing the defense. This event finally brought the Soviet offensive to a halt, and it would not be renewed until August, which in part gave time for the 320th to recover from its mauling. Shvygin was replaced by Col. Yosif Zakarovich Burik, who would remain in command until nearly the end of the war.

== Into the Balkans ==
The division would remain in 37th Rifle Corps until the last weeks of the war. At the start of the Second Jassy–Kishinev Operation the Corps also had the 59th and 108th Guards Rifle Divisions under command. At the outset of the offensive on August 20, 37th Rifle Corps held a front of about 10 km from Talmaza to Răscăieți and attacked with 31st Guards Rifle from the center of 46th Army's positions in the direction of Volintiri. On that first day the two Corps broke through the German XXIX Corps defense along the boundary with XXX Corps, helped inflict a heavy defeat on the 4th Romanian Mountain Division and forced 21st Romanian Infantry Division out of its defenses. 37th Corps also captured the town of Cioburciu. During the next day all three divisions reached a line south of Adjiler and Slobozia. By the end of August 22 advance elements of 37th Corps advanced as far as Zabar, and 3rd Ukrainian Front had torn a gap in the enemy front 130 km wide and as much as 70 km deep. On the next day 46th Army continued the operations that encircled the Akkerman group of Romanian Third Army, and 37th Corps forced a crossing of the Cogâlnic River.

From September to December 1944, 46th Army was in 2nd Ukrainian Front near Budapest, before reverting to 3rd Ukrainian Front at year's end. In January 1945, 37th Corps became a separate unit in the reserves of 2nd Ukrainian Front. The following month, in preparation for the final offensive on Vienna, the 320th and its corps became part of 27th Army, back in 3rd Ukrainian Front. On April 7, Col. Yakov Nikiforovich Vronskii took command of the division; he would be promoted to the rank of Major General on April 20 and would lead the division until the peace. In the last weeks of April the division was detached from 37th Corps to operate as a separate division under 27th Army.

== Postwar ==
By the conclusion of hostilities, the division had been awarded the full title of 320th Rifle, Yenakiyevo, Order of the Red Banner, Order of Suvorov Division; (Russian: 320-я стрелковая Енакиевская Краснознамённая ордена Суворова дивизия). Initially part of the Southern Group of Forces with the 37th Rifle Corps, the division and its corps became part of the 38th Army after 27th Army was disbanded in the Carpathian Military District. The division was moved to Kamenetz-Podolsk in the fall of 1945. The corps and the 320th Rifle Division were disbanded by July 1946.

== In popular culture ==
The 320th Rifle Division is featured extensively in Multi-Man Publishing's 2011 Historical Advanced Squad Leader module Festung Budapest.
