= Dunaegyháza =

Village in Bács-Kiskun, Hungary

- Flag Coat of arms

- Location of Dunaegyháza Dunaegyháza (Hungary) Dunaegyháza (Europe)
- Coordinates: 46°50′N 18°57′E
- Country: Hungary
- County: Bács-Kiskun
- District: Kunszentmiklós

Area
  - Total: 10.12 km^{2} (3.91 sq mi)

Population (2015)
  - Total: 1,389
  - Density: 137.3/km^{2} (356/sq mi)
- Time zone: UTC+1 (CET)
  - Summer (DST): UTC+2 (CEST)
- Postal code: 6323
- Area code: 78

Dunaegyháza is a village in Bács-Kiskun county, in the Southern Great Plain region of Hungary. It is part of the Central European Time Zone (UTC+2)

== Geography ==
It covers an area of 10.12 km^{2} (4 sq mi) and had a population of 1389 people as of 2015.
