= Vál =

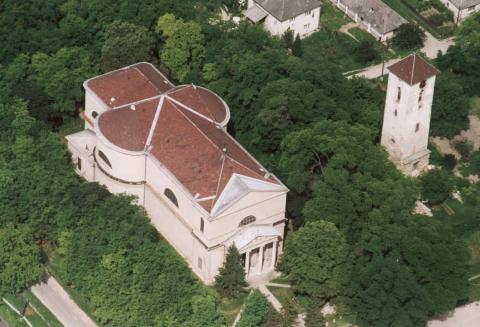
- Aerial view

- Coat of arms

- Location of Vál
- Coordinates: 47.36369°N 18.67532°E
- Country: Hungary
- County: Fejér

Area
  - Total: 40.48 km^{2} (15.63 sq mi)

Population (2004)
  - Total: 2,394
  - Density: 59.14/km^{2} (153.2/sq mi)
- Time zone: UTC+1 (CET)
  - Summer (DST): UTC+2 (CEST)
- Postal code: 2473
- Area code: 22
- Website: www.val.hu

Vál is a village in Fejér County, Hungary.
