= 3rd Ukrainian Front =

WW2 Soviet Red Army formation

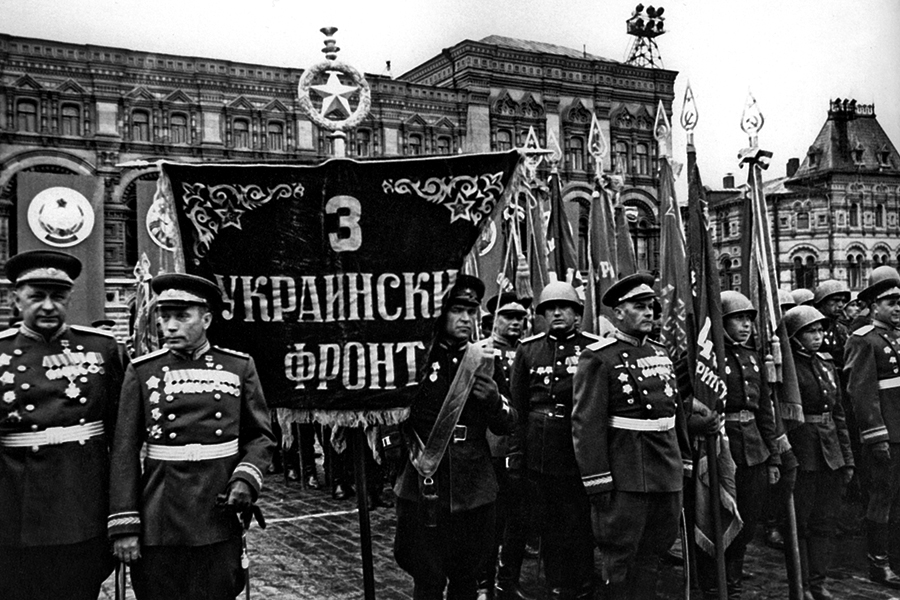
3rd Ukrainian Front on parade at the 1945 Victory Parade on Red Square

The 3rd Ukrainian Front (Russian: Третий Украинский фронт, romanized: Tretiy Ukrainskiy front) was a Front of the Soviet Red Army during World War II.

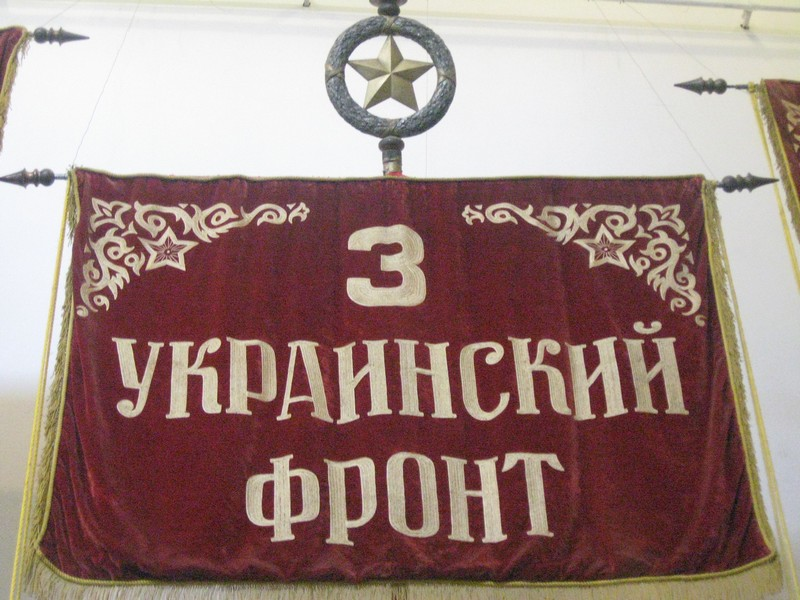
3rd Ukrainian Front's Banner

It was founded on 20 October 1943, on the basis of a Stavka order of October 16, 1943, by renaming the Southwestern Front. It included 1st Guards Army, 8th Guards Army, 6th, 12th, and 46th Armies and 17th Air Army. Later it included 5th Shock, 4th and 9th Guards Army, 26th, 27th, 28th, 37th, 57th Army, 6th Guards Tank Army, and the Bulgarian First, Second and Fourth Armies. The Danube Flotilla was assigned to the Front's operational control. This included the 83rd Naval Infantry Brigade.

== Zaporizhzhia and Dnipropetrovsk offensive operations ==
In the first half of October 1943, Southwestern Front (3rd Ukrainian Front from 20 October) commanded by Army General Rodion Malinovsky was tasked with attacking the German Panther-Wotan line, and later securing the bridgeheads on the eastern bank of the Dnieper on the Izyum - Dnipropetrovsk axis during the Battle of the Lower Dnieper. But the first attempt to establish bridgeheads failed. Three infantry armies: 8th Guards, 3rd Guards and the 12th Army, and two corps, 1st Guards Mechanized and 23rd Tank with 17th Air Army providing air support were assembled for the new assault.

On 10 October 1943 Chuikov's 8th Guards launched the attack, with the tank corps being inserted on the 13 October; the 12th Army attacked from the north, and 3rd Guards from the south of Zaporizhzhia. Germans retreated from Zaporizhzhia, destroying the railway bridge over Dnieper behind themselves.

On 23 October Malinovsky, who wanted to take Dnipropetrovsk, and trap the First Panzer Army in the eastern reaches of the Dnieper bend, inserted the newly arrived 46th Army into combat. Together with 8th Guards it was trying to trap German forces against the western bank of Dnieper between Dnipropetrovsk and Dniprodzerzhynsk, the site of the huge Dnieper Hydroelectric Station. The 46th Army units tried to get to the station in time to prevent the destruction of the dam by retreating German troops. On 25 October Dnipropetrovsk was taken, but the installations and the Dam were partly destroyed.

At the same time the Koniev's 2nd Ukrainian Front was attacking towards the Kryvyi Rih from the north with the 7th Guards Army, but the 1st Panzer Army was saved for the moment as Koniev's assault on Kryvyi Rih stalled at Ingulets river north of Kherson. However, Vatutin commanding the 1st Ukrainian Front located north of Poltava sent the 5th Guards Tank Army which penetrated north of Kryvyi Rih, and was only halted by the stubborn German defence and length of its own logistic tail. On conclusion, both operations allowed the two Fronts to create a single Krementchug-Dnipropetrovsk bridgehead that expanded to Zaporizhzhia due to the breaching of the Wotan Line by the Southern Front.

Later, units of the 6th Army seized bridgeheads south of Zaporizhzhia, and by the end of December, along with 2nd Ukrainian Front held on the Dnieper major strategic stronghold.

After the liberation of right-bank Ukraine by troops of the 3rd Ukrainian Front, in collaboration with 4th Ukrainian Front by making Nikopol-Krivoy Rog Operation 1944, the took to the district Ingulets, where in March–April launched an offensive at the Nikolayev-Odessa area. After carrying out the Bereznegovatoye–Snigirevka Offensive operation, the front readied itself for an attack on Odessa.

Before the Odessa Offensive 3rd Ukrainian received substantial reinforcements. It now fielded seven Armies: 5th Shock Army, 6th Army, 8th Guards Army, 28th Army, 37th Army, 46th Army and 57th Army. Malinowsky also formed a cavalry-mechanized group consisting of 4th Guards Cavalry Corps and 4th Mechanized Corps under Lt. Gen. Pliev. The target was port Nikolayev and large Black Sea port Odessa. The attack opened on 6 March 1944 when Soviet troops forced the Ingulets, the Visun and the Ingul rivers. They assisted the Black Sea Fleet completing the liberation of southern Ukraine, and liberated a large part of the Moldavian SSR and moved to Dniester and, seizing bridgeheads on its right bank, including Kitskansky bridgehead.

== Romania and Bulgaria ==
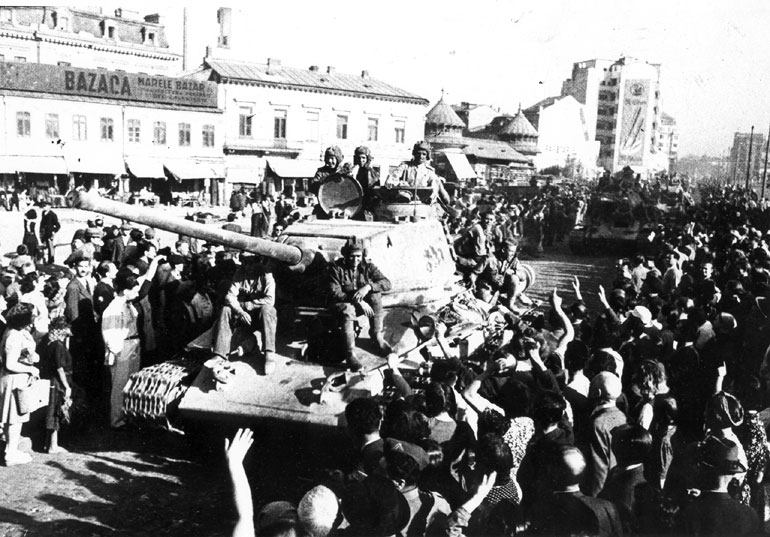
Elements of the 3rd Ukrainian Front entered Bucharest on 31 August 1944

In August 1944 the 3rd Ukrainian Front engaged in the Iassy-Kishinev Offensive, which resulted in the release of all the Moldavian SSR, and Romania declaring war on Germany.

On 8 September, after breaking diplomatic ties and declaring war on Bulgaria, Soviet troops entered the territory of Bulgaria and occupied part of the country . The next day a Bulgarian communist led coalition organized a coup and took over the government, eventually switching sides and declaring war on Germany. From 28 September - 20 October 1944 3rd Ukrainian Front in collaboration with the People's Liberation Army of Yugoslavia with the participation of troops of the Fatherland Front in Bulgaria carried out the Belgrade Offensive, which resulted in the liberation of the capital of Yugoslavia, Belgrade, and most of Serbia.

In October 1944 - February 1945, the 3rd Ukrainian Front had forces involved in the Siege of Budapest, including 46th Army. Its troops crossed the Danube and seized a bridgehead on its right bank. In January 1945, they repelled the enemy counter-attacks, trying to relieve the forces surrounded in Budapest, and in March, during the German Operation Frühlingserwachen, a counter-offensive broke the German troops in the area of Lake Balaton. The successful completion of this battle made possible the beginning of the Vienna Offensive on 16 March, in conjunction with the left wing 2nd Ukrainian Front. Thereafter the front's forces completed the liberation of Hungary, expelled the enemy from the eastern part of Austria and took its capital, Vienna.

The Front included 57th Army from October to December 1944.

On 15 June 1945, on the basis of a Stavka directive on May 29, 1945, the front was disbanded, and reorganised as the Southern Group of Forces. 26th Army was grouped with 37th Army into the SGF.

== 3rd Ukrainian Front in October 1943 during Zaporizhzhia–Dnipropetrovsk operation ==
Front Commander: General of Army Rodion Malinovsky

1st Guards Army

6th Guards Rifle Corps

20th Guards Rifle Division
152nd Rifle Division

34th Rifle Corps

6th Rifle Division
24th Rifle Division
228th Rifle Division
195th Rifle Division

3rd Guards Army:

34th Guards Rifle Corps

59th Guards Rifle Division
61st Guards Rifle Division
279th Rifle Division (Unit listed twice)

32nd Rifle Corps

259th Rifle Division
266th Rifle Division
279th Rifle Division (Unit listed twice)

8th Guards Army:

28th Guards Rifle Corps

39th Guards Rifle Division
79th Guards Rifle Division
88th Guards Rifle Division

29th Guards Rifle Corps

27th Guards Rifle Division
74th Guards Rifle Division
82nd Guards Rifle Division

33rd Rifle Corps

50th Rifle Division
78th Rifle Division

6th Army:

4th Guards Rifle Corps

47th Guards Rifle Division
57th Guards Rifle Division

26th Guards Rifle Corps

25th Guards Rifle Division
35th Guards Rifle Division

12th Army

66th Rifle Corps

203rd Rifle Division
333rd Rifle Division
60th Guards Rifle Division
244th Rifle Division

1st Guards Mechanized Corps

1st Guards Mechanized Brigade
2nd Guards Mechanized Brigade
3rd Guards Mechanized Brigade
9th Guards Tank Brigade

23rd Tank Corps

3rd Tank Brigade
39th Tank Brigade
135th Tank Brigade
56th Motorized Rifle Brigade

17th Air Army

1st Guards Mixed Aviation Corps
1st Mixed Aviation Corps
9th Mixed Aviation Corps

== Command ==
Commanders:

- General of the Army Rodion Malinovsky (Oct. 1943 – May 1944);
- General of the Army, in September 1944, Marshal of the Soviet Union Fyodor Tolbukhin (May 1944 – end of the war).

Member of the Military Council:

- Lieutenant-General in September 1944, Colonel-General A. Zheltov (whole period).

Chief of Staff:

- Lieutenant-General Theodosius K. Korzhenevich (Oct. 1943 – May 1944);
- Lieutenant-General in May 1944, Colonel-General Sergey Biryuzov (May–October 1944);
- Lieutenant-General in April 1945, Colonel-General Simon P. Ivanov (October 1944 – end of the war).
