= Ercsi =

- Town
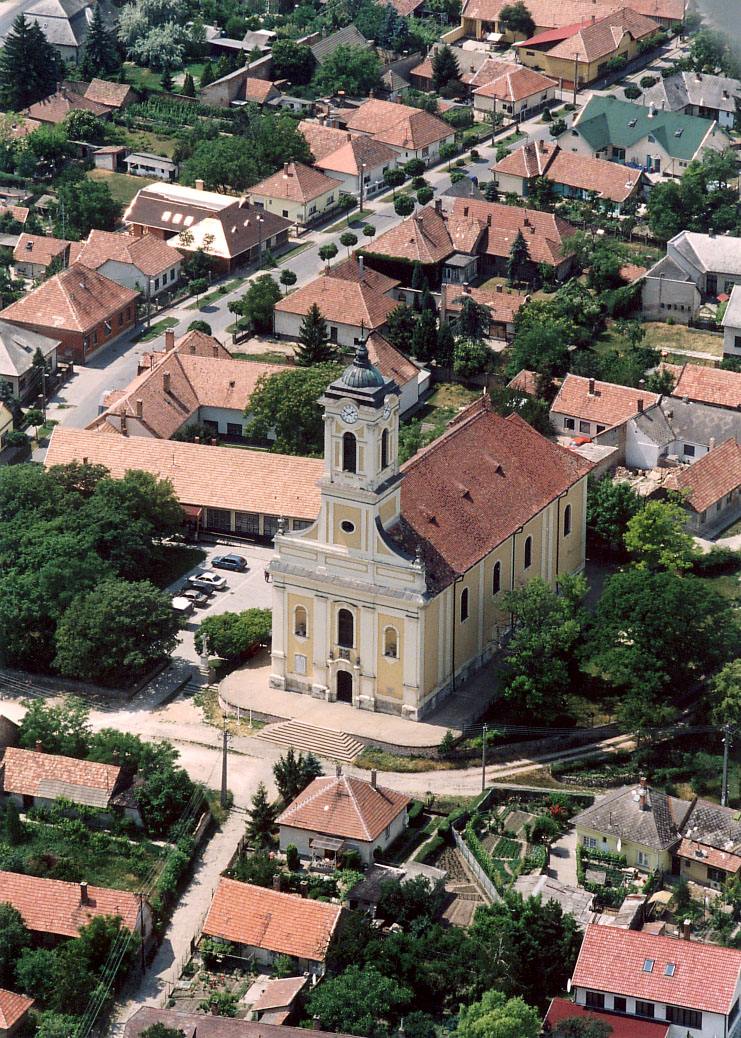
- Ercsi, church

- Flag Coat of arms

- Location of Ercsi
- Coordinates: 47.24964°N 18.89103°E
- Country: Hungary
- County: Fejér
- District: Martonvásár

Area
  - Total: 65.31 km^{2} (25.22 sq mi)

Population (2008)
  - Total: 8,563
  - Density: 128.7/km^{2} (333/sq mi)
- Time zone: UTC+1 (CET)
  - Summer (DST): UTC+2 (CEST)
- Postal code: 2451
- Area code: (+36) 25
- Website: www.ercsi.hu

Ercsi is a town in Fejér county in central Hungary, located around 35 km south of Budapest.
