= Bratislava–Brno offensive =

World War II Red Army offensive

Bratislava-Brno offensive
- Part of The Eastern Front of World War II
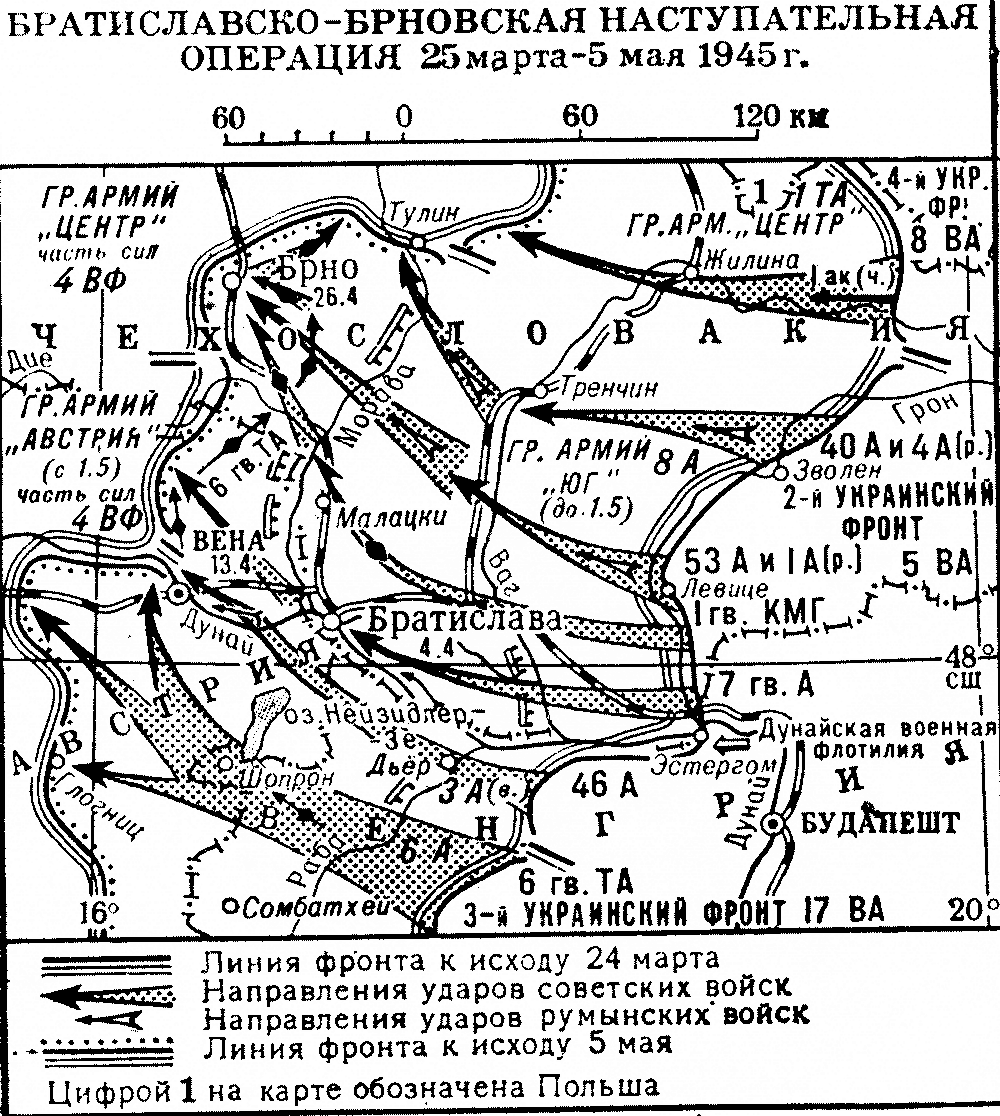
Date	25 March – 5 May 1945
Location	Slovak Republic, Protectorate of Bohemia and Moravia
Result	Soviet victory
Territorial changes	Slovak Republic and Moravia became part of the reestablished Czechoslovakia again

Belligerents
Germany; Hungary	Soviet Union; Romania; Czechoslovakia

Commanders and leaders
Otto Wöhler; Lothar Rendulic; Ferdinand Schörner; Hans Kreysing; W. Schmidt-Hammer; Kurt Röpke; Kurt Versock; Ulrich Kleemann; Walther Nehring	Rodion Malinovsky; Andrei Kravchenko; Mikhail Shumilov; Filipp Zhmachenko; Ivan Managarov; Issa Pliyev; Vasile Atanasiu; Nicolae Dăscălescu

Units involved
Army Group South (Note: renamed Army Group Ostmark); Army Group Centre	2nd Ukrainian Front: Romanian 1st Army; Romanian 4th Army

Casualties and losses
Unknown	16,933 killed

The Bratislava–Brno offensive was an offensive conducted by the Red Army in western Slovak Republic and south Moravia towards the end of World War II. The offensive was held between 25 March and 5 May 1945 using the forces of the 2nd Ukrainian Front to capture the capital of Slovakia, Bratislava, and the capital of Moravia, Brno.

== Background ==
In the spring of 1945, the Red Army launched a major offensive on the southern wing of the Eastern Front. On 10 March, the 4th Ukrainian Front began the Moravian-Ostrava offensive, and on 15 March 3rd Ukrainian Front began the Vienna offensive. The 2nd Ukrainian Front, which was located between the 3rd and 4th Ukrainian Fronts, was assigned the mission to capture Bratislava and Brno.

== The offensive ==
=== Advance to Bratislava ===
At the beginning of the offensive the 7th Guards Army, in a surprise night attack, broke through defenses of German 153rd and 357th Infantry Divisions on the river Hron. The breakthrough had a width of 17 kilometres (11 mi) and within two days the army had advanced about 35 kilometres (22 mi) west to Nové Zámky. These units were assisted by ships of the Soviet Danube Fleet under the command of Rear Admiral Klostakakov and members of the 83rd Independent Marine Brigade. To speed up the process, Marshal Malinovsky ordered the ships of the Soviet Danube Fleet between the villages of Moča and Radvaň nad Dunajom to land the 83rd Marine Brigade on our Danube banks in the rear of the enemy, thus helping to break through the enemy's defenses. March 29, when Red Army units conquered Komárom (with part of Komárno) in Hungary and Nové Zámky in Slovakia.

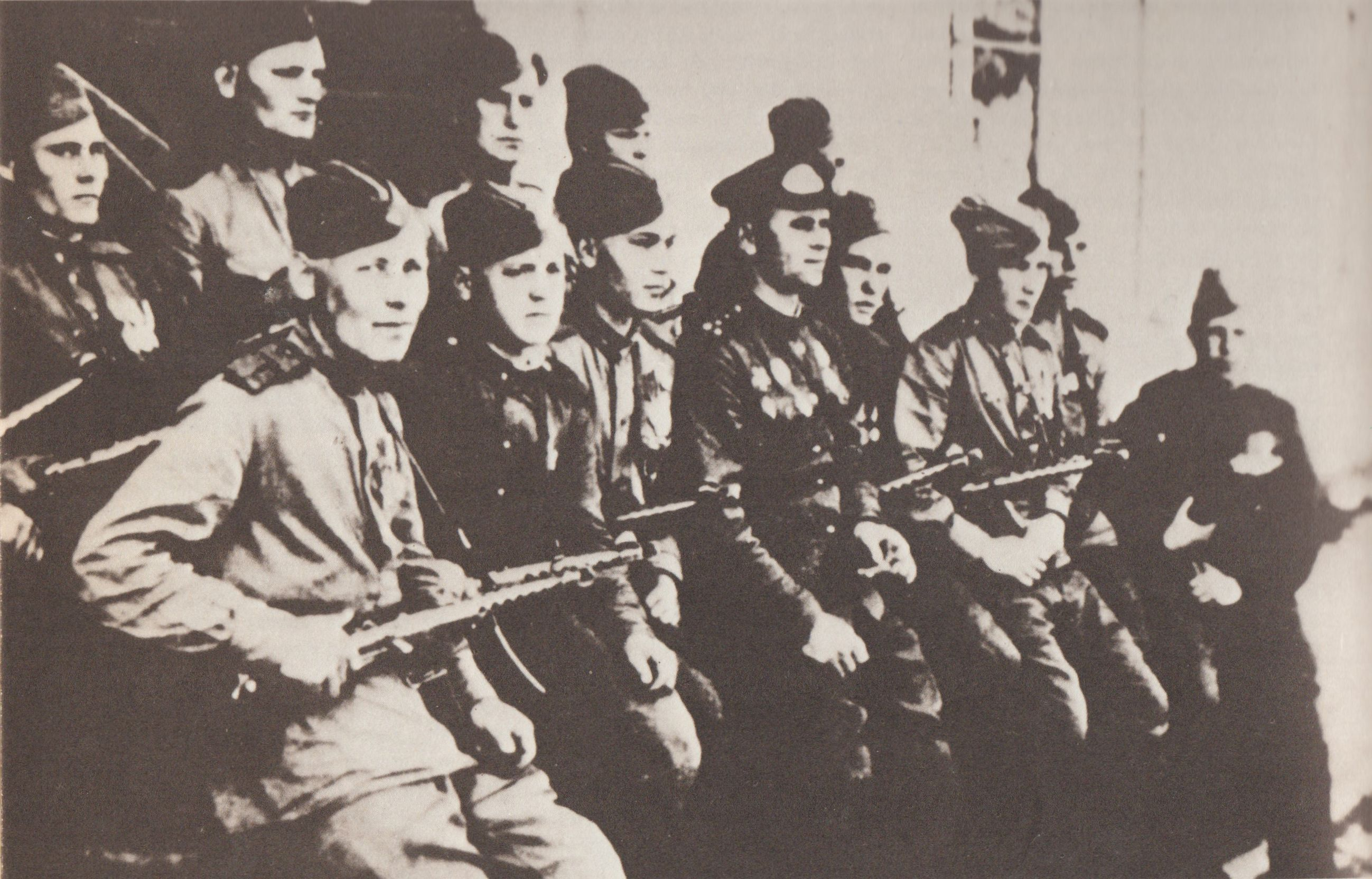
Group of Red Army platoons, the Danube Fleet, after liberation of Komárno in April 1944

Then the 7th Guards Army quickly rushed across the Danubian Lowland towards Bratislava. The advance of 53rd Army in the central Slovakia was slower due to the hilly terrain and the movement of the 40th Army in the mountains was even slower. However, on 26 March 1945 the Romanian 4th Army liberated Banská Bystrica, the centre of the Slovak National Uprising, defeated in the previous year. On 2 April the battle of Bratislava started when the Soviet units captured the Airport in Vajnory. President Tiso and the government of the puppet Slovak Republic had already left the capital and by 5 April found asylum in Austrian monastery of Kremsmünster. The defense of Bratislava consisted of units of the German 6th Army and Hungarian 3rd Army. On the night of 3 April, Germans destroyed all major bridges over the Danube. With the support of the 27th Tank Brigade and the Danube Flotilla, Soviet soldiers of the 23rd Rifle Corps and the 25th Guards Rifle Corps (both part of the 7th Guards Army) pushed German troops out of the city. Bratislava was liberated by the evening of 4 April in the second week of the operation. The city districts on the south bank of the Danube were captured the next day by 46th Army. This army too was part of the 2nd Ukrainian Front, but because it fought on other side of the Danube River, for most of the time it took part in the Vienna offensive of the 3rd Ukrainian Front. For the liberation of Bratislava the 46th Army contributed its 10th Guards Rifle Corps. The Czechoslovak government and president then moved to Bratislava on 8 May.

=== Morava crossing ===
The next main obstacle to further Soviet advance was the Slovak-Moravian border created by the Morava river, which in the area (between Devín and Hodonín) was surrounded by riparian forests and wetland. In the springtime the flooded area was up to 8 kilometres (5 mi) wide. Despite this, on 6 April the first reconnaissance units of the 6th Guards Cavalry Corps crossed the river and the next day they secured the damaged bridge and railway embankment, which was the only way above water. The heavy battle for the town of Lanžhot lasted for four days, where the strong German defense was strengthened by more than 60 tanks, including the Tiger II heavy tank. Lanžhot was finally liberated on 11 April, but 25% of its houses were completely destroyed and another 60% were damaged. Soviet cavalry lost nearly 1,500 men and 2,000 horses, mostly as the result of long immersion in cold water. The 53rd Army had crossed Morava river near Hodonín which was liberated early on 13 April. The 53rd Army lost about 350 men during the crossing, while the German army about 130 men. At the time, the 40th Army on the right flank was still fighting in Slovak mountains. On 10 April the Army liberated the town of Trenčín and managed to cross the Váh River south of the town despite all bridges being destroyed by retreating German troops. Trenčín then became "front city" and its districts behind the river were not liberated until 29 April.

=== Battle of Ořechov ===
After the breakthrough at river Morava Soviet units of 7th Mechanized Corps swiftly advanced to Jihlava river where they met the German division Feldherrnhalle. On 18 April the commander of Army Group Centre ordered to abolish the "Festung Brno" and to encounter the enemy on the approaches to the city. The Soviet advance was stopped at the town Rajhrad 15 kilometres (9 mi) south of Brno. The Soviet units however continued further west and by 10pm of the same day they reached the church of small village Ořechov, less than 12 km from the outskirt of Brno, which thus became within the range of Soviet artillery. The reconnaissance units of the 7th Mechanized Corps penetrated further north-west and captured several villages, including the village Popůvky. Some of the Soviet light tanks even reached the outskirt of Brno but were soon destroyed.

Because the Feldherrnhalle division was behind the Jihlava river and this area was defended only by SS training units and Volksturm, the tanks of 16th Panzer-Division were called for the assistance in counterattack. In the evening of 19 April, German tanks and assault guns quickly penetrated the lines of exhausted Soviet soldiers, by fire at close range destroyed many Soviet tanks and recaptured the village Ořechov and the hillock with church. The next day, 20 April, German tanks of 16th Panzer-Division attacked towards the tanks of Feldherrnhalle division and together cut off and surrounded the Soviet reconnaissance at Popůvky. But the Germans did not have enough strength to completely destroy the encircled Soviets. Moreover, the commander of 16th Panzer-Division was captured by Czech partisans which badly affected its coordination with other German units. In the night 23/24 April, the 7th Mechanized Corps launched new attack and relieved the encircled units, the next day once more liberated Ořechov. The battle of Ořechov lasted seven days and was the greatest tank battle in the history of Moravia. The Red Army had lost 960 men and 35 armored vehicles, Germans had lost about 275–300 men and about 30 armored vehicles, the village Ořechov had suffered 23 casualties and 80% of houses destroyed.

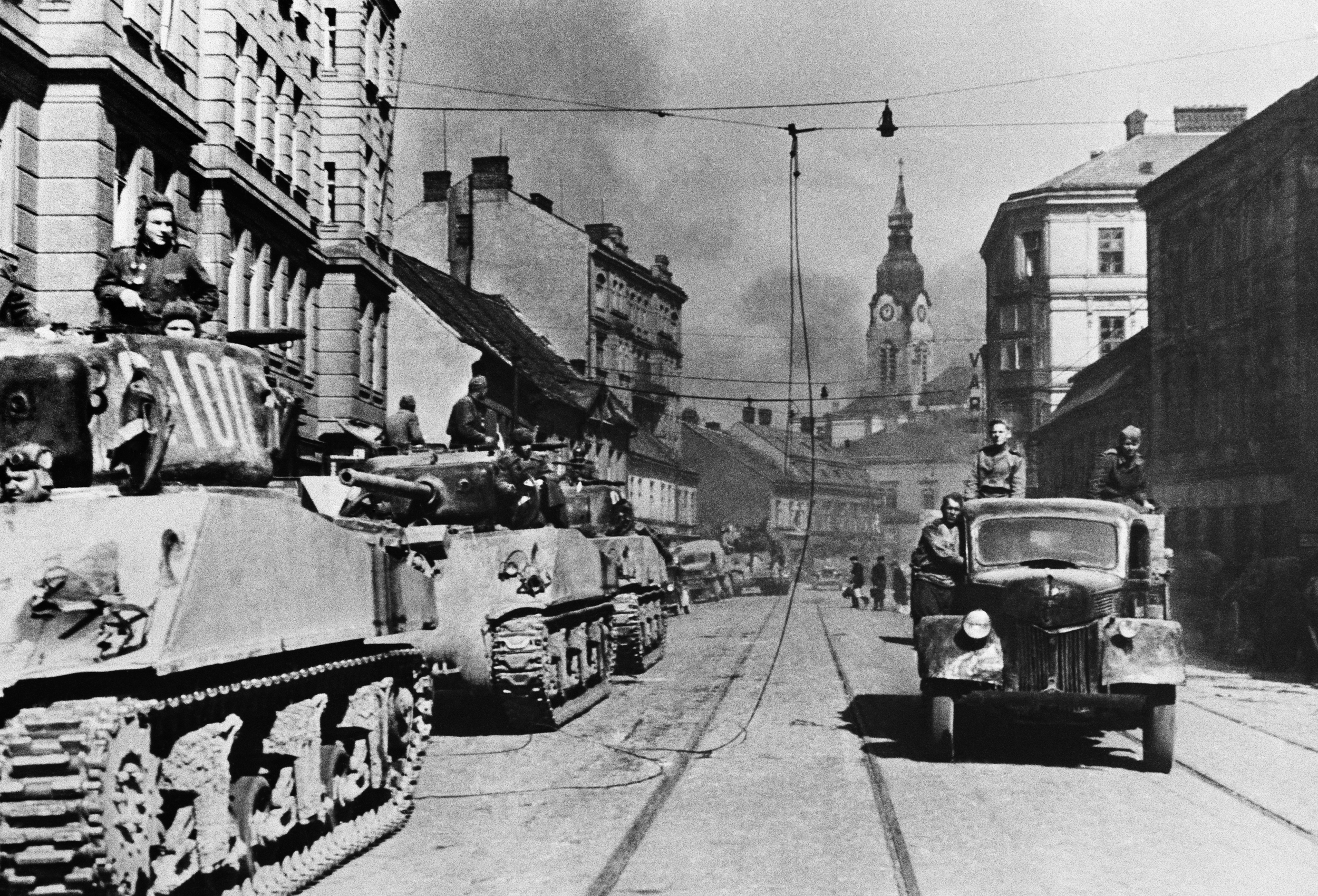
Soviet American built M4 Sherman medium tank in Brno, April 1945

=== Liberation of Brno ===
The new Soviet assault was supported by 6th Guards Tank Army which had just arrived to the rear of 53rd Army after the fall of Vienna. While the 1st Guards Mechanized Cavalry Group renewed its attack on Brno, the 53rd Army launched the attack east of Brno, advancing towards Šlapanice and Slavkov. The army's advance broke through the German lines and the 6th Guards Tank Army advanced through the gap in the evening of 23 April. By the evening of 25 April the army's tanks reached the outskirts of Brno from the east, while the Mechanized Cavalry Group reached Brno from the south. The next morning the city centre was liberated and by noon also the Špilberk Castle, which until then served as the Brno Gestapo prison.

Brno was liberated on 26 April 1945, but some of its northern districts were in German hands until 5 May. In the days following the liberation, armies of 2nd Ukrainian Front secured the western front line and expanded northwards to meet the forces of 4th Ukrainian Front and thus to outflank the German 1st Panzer Army. However, after the outbreak of Prague uprising Stavka changed the orders and the 2nd Ukrainian Front joined the Prague offensive. Meanwhile, both the Romanian 1st and 4th armies advanced along the Morava River and before the end of the war liberated the towns of Otrokovice, Kroměříž, and Prostějov.

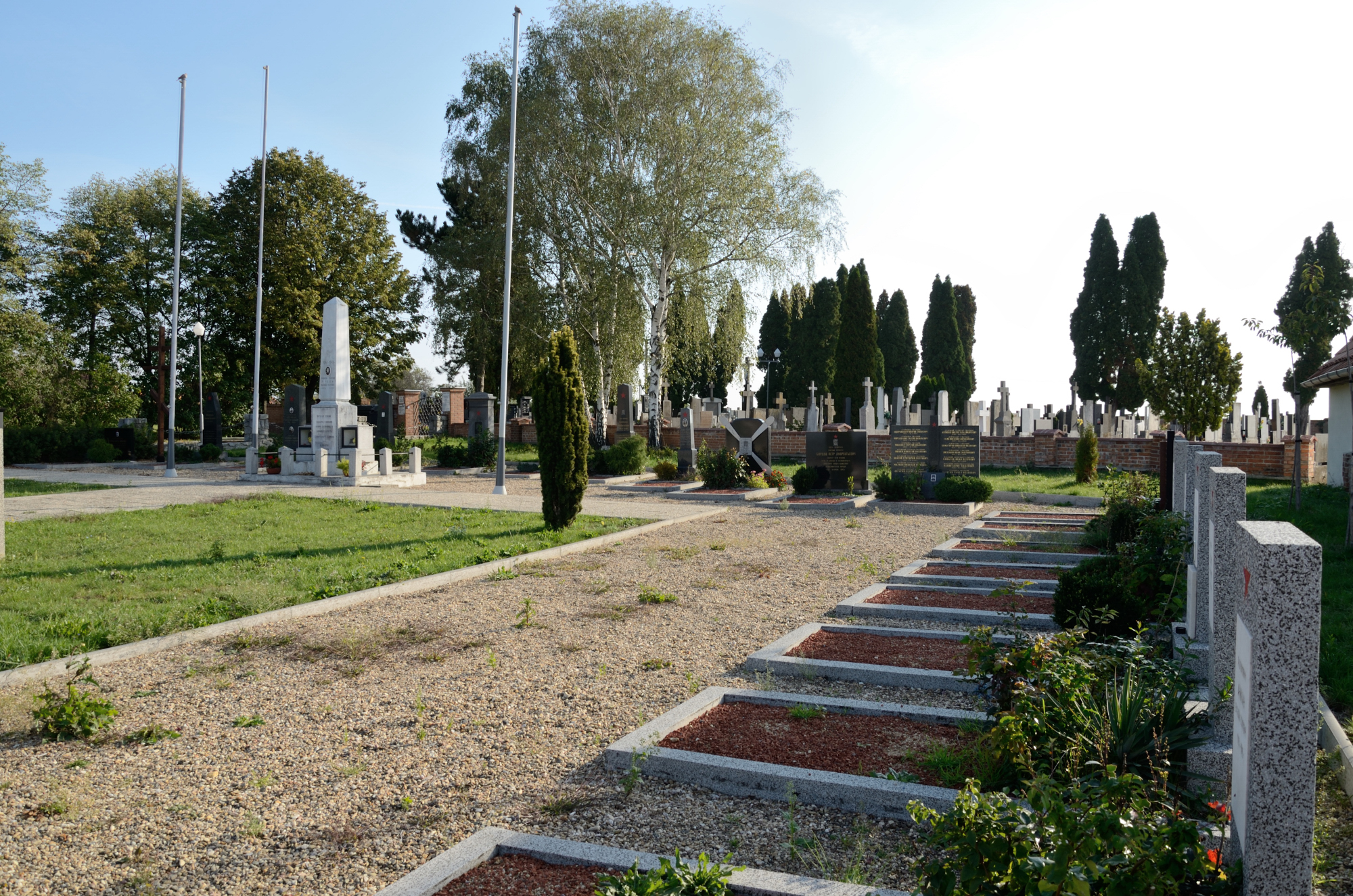
The Red Army cemetery in Ořechov, where 1,452 Soviet soldiers are interred.

== Aftermath ==
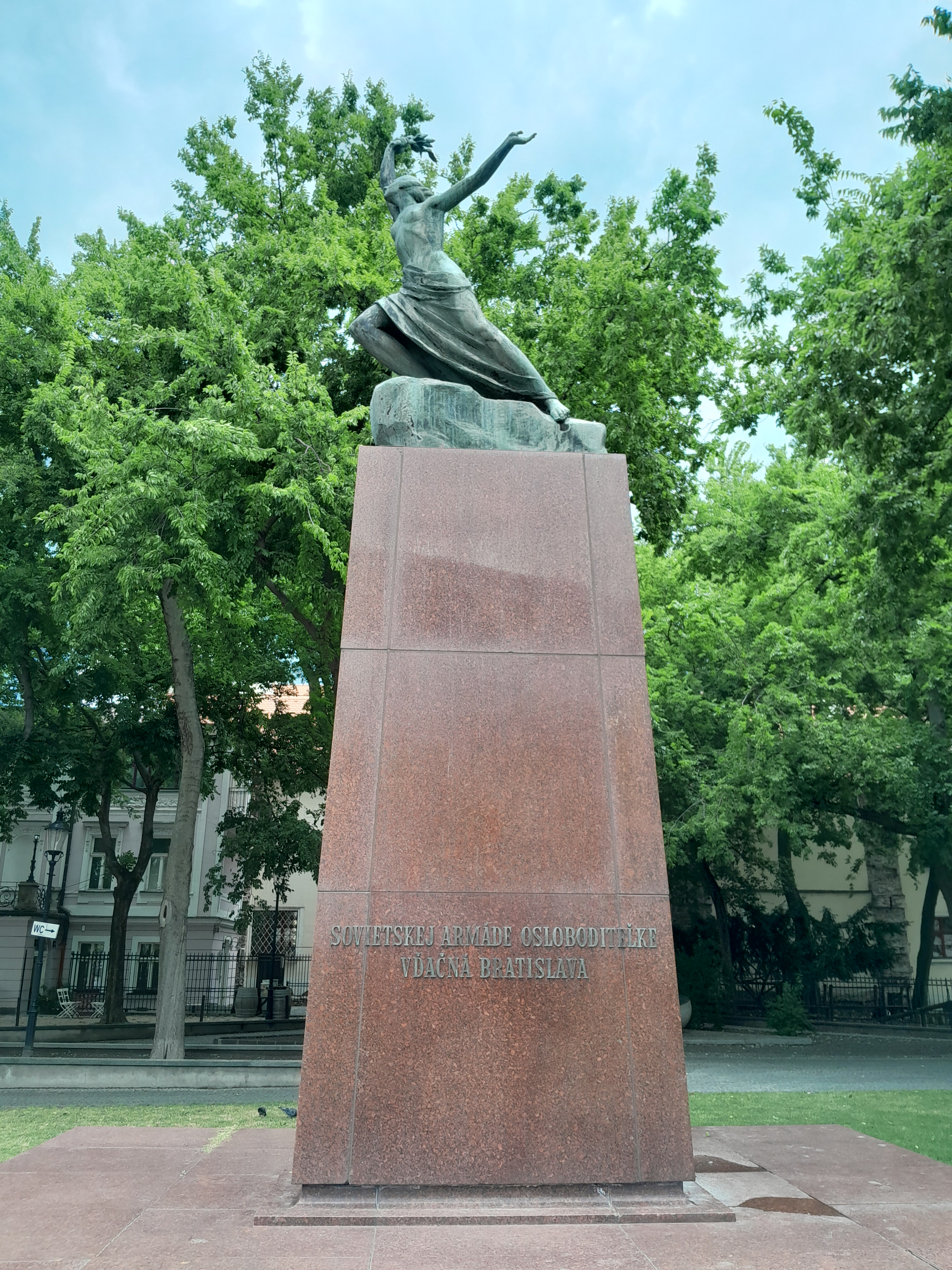
Statue dedicated to liberation of the city by Soviet forces, in Bratislava

During the offensive, Soviet forces had suffered casualties of nearly 17,000 killed. Soviet sources reported that they had destroyed nine German divisions. The offensive had reportedly created conditions for the Prague offensive as it enabled to outflank the Army Group Centre from the south.

Within the Soviet 53rd Army was also attached a Czechoslovak Special Purpose Company. Its only purpose was to capture and secure the buildings in Brno for the needs of Czechoslovak government. However, because of the rapid end of war the government had relocated from Bratislava directly to Prague on 10 May. President Edvard Beneš spent almost one week in the liberated Brno before he joined the government in Prague.

== Orders of battle ==
=== USSR ===
The 2nd Ukrainian Front (commanded by Marshal Rodion Malinovsky; its chief of staff was Army General Matvei Zakharov) was composed of the following units.

- 7th Guards Army (Colonel General Mikhail Shumilov)
- 40th Army (Lieutenant General Filipp Zhmachenko)
  - 4th Romanian Army General Nicolae Dăscălescu
- 53rd Army (Lieutenant General Ivan Managarov)
  - 1st Romanian Army (General Vasile Atanasiu)
- 1st Guards Cavalry Mechanized Group (Lieutenant General Issa Pliyev)
- 5th Air Army (Colonel General Sergey Goryunov)
- Danube Flotilla (Rear Admiral Georgy Kholostyakov)
- 6th Guards Tank Army (Colonel General Andrei Kravchenko), since 16 April 1945

=== Germany ===
Elements of Army Group South (commanded by Otto Wöhler)

- 8th Army (Hans Kreysing)
  - LXXII Army Corps (Werner Schmidt-Hammer)
  - XXIX Army Corps (Kurt Röpke)
  - XXXXIII Army Corps (Kurt Versock)
  - Panzer Corps Feldherrnhalle (Ulrich Kleemann)

Elements of Army Group Centre (commanded by Ferdinand Schörner)

- 1st Panzer Army (Walther Nehring)

Air support was provided by Luftflotte 4.
