= Korsun–Cherkassy Pocket order of battle =

This order of battle lists the Soviet and German forces involved in the Battle of the Korsun–Cherkassy Pocket in January–February 1944.

== Soviet ==
Front	Army	Corps	Division
1st Ukrainian Vatutin	27th Army; Trofimenko	47th Rifle Corps	38th Rifle Division
1st Ukrainian Vatutin	27th Army; Trofimenko	47th Rifle Corps	136th Rifle Division
1st Ukrainian Vatutin	27th Army; Trofimenko	47th Rifle Corps	180th Rifle Division
1st Ukrainian Vatutin	27th Army; Trofimenko	Subordinated to army	206th Rifle Division
1st Ukrainian Vatutin	27th Army; Trofimenko	Subordinated to army	309th Rifle Division
1st Ukrainian Vatutin	27th Army; Trofimenko	Subordinated to army	337th Rifle Division
1st Ukrainian Vatutin	27th Army; Trofimenko	Subordinated to army	54th Fortified Region; 159th Fortified Region
1st Ukrainian Vatutin	40th Army; Zhmachenko	50th Rifle Corps	74th Rifle Division
1st Ukrainian Vatutin	40th Army; Zhmachenko	50th Rifle Corps	163rd Rifle Division
1st Ukrainian Vatutin	40th Army; Zhmachenko	50th Rifle Corps	240th Rifle Division
1st Ukrainian Vatutin	40th Army; Zhmachenko	51st Rifle Corps (to SW of pocket)	167th Rifle Division
1st Ukrainian Vatutin	40th Army; Zhmachenko	51st Rifle Corps (to SW of pocket)	232nd Rifle Division
1st Ukrainian Vatutin	40th Army; Zhmachenko	51st Rifle Corps (to SW of pocket)	340th Rifle Division
1st Ukrainian Vatutin	40th Army; Zhmachenko	Subordinated to army	Czechoslovak Brigade
1st Ukrainian Vatutin	6th Tank Army; Kravchenko	5th Mechanized Corps
1st Ukrainian Vatutin	6th Tank Army; Kravchenko	5th Guards Tank Corps
1st Ukrainian Vatutin	Subordinated to front	Direct front control	42nd Guards Rifle Division
1st Ukrainian Vatutin	Subordinated to front	Direct front control	237th Rifle Division
1st Ukrainian Vatutin	Subordinated to front	Direct front control	389th Rifle Division
1st Ukrainian Vatutin	Subordinated to front	Direct front control	1st Guards Cavalry Corps
1st Ukrainian Vatutin	Subordinated to front	Direct front control	1st Guards Artillery Division
1st Ukrainian Vatutin	Subordinated to front	Direct front control	3rd Guards; Rocket Launcher Division
2nd Ukrainian; Konev	4th Guards Army; Ryzhov	20th Guards Rifle Corps	5th Guards Airborne Division
2nd Ukrainian; Konev	4th Guards Army; Ryzhov	20th Guards Rifle Corps	66th Guards Rifle Division
2nd Ukrainian; Konev	4th Guards Army; Ryzhov	20th Guards Rifle Corps	375th Rifle Division
2nd Ukrainian; Konev	4th Guards Army; Ryzhov	21st Guards Rifle Corps	69th Guards Rifle Division
2nd Ukrainian; Konev	4th Guards Army; Ryzhov	21st Guards Rifle Corps	138th Rifle Division
2nd Ukrainian; Konev	52nd Army; Koroteev	73rd Rifle Corps	7th Guards Airborne Division
2nd Ukrainian; Konev	52nd Army; Koroteev	73rd Rifle Corps	62nd Guards Rifle Division
2nd Ukrainian; Konev	52nd Army; Koroteev	78th Rifle Corps	254th Rifle Division
2nd Ukrainian; Konev	52nd Army; Koroteev	78th Rifle Corps	373rd Rifle Division
2nd Ukrainian; Konev	52nd Army; Koroteev	Subordinated to army	294th Rifle Division
2nd Ukrainian; Konev	5th Guards Tank Army; Rotmistrov	18th Tank Corps
2nd Ukrainian; Konev	5th Guards Tank Army; Rotmistrov	29th Tank Corps
2nd Ukrainian; Konev	Subordinated to front	26th Guards Rifle Corps	25th Guards Rifle Division
2nd Ukrainian; Konev	Subordinated to front	26th Guards Rifle Corps	6th Rifle Division
2nd Ukrainian; Konev	Subordinated to front	26th Guards Rifle Corps	31st Rifle Division
2nd Ukrainian; Konev	Subordinated to front	Direct front control	89th Guards Rifle Division
2nd Ukrainian; Konev	Subordinated to front	Direct front control	5th Guards Cavalry Corps
2nd Ukrainian; Konev	Subordinated to front	Direct front control	20th Tank Corps

== German ==
Army Group	Army	Corps	Division
South Manstein	8th Army; Wöhler	XI Corps; Stemmermann (encircled)	5th SS Panzer Division
South Manstein	8th Army; Wöhler	XI Corps; Stemmermann (encircled)	5th SS Infantry Brigade
South Manstein	8th Army; Wöhler	XI Corps; Stemmermann (encircled)	57th Infantry Division
South Manstein	8th Army; Wöhler	XI Corps; Stemmermann (encircled)	72nd Infantry Division
South Manstein	8th Army; Wöhler	XI Corps; Stemmermann (encircled)	389th Infantry Division
South Manstein	8th Army; Wöhler	XXXXVII Panzer Corps (relief force)	3rd Panzer Division
South Manstein	8th Army; Wöhler	XXXXVII Panzer Corps (relief force)	11th Panzer Division
South Manstein	8th Army; Wöhler	XXXXVII Panzer Corps (relief force)	13th Panzer Division
South Manstein	8th Army; Wöhler	XXXXVII Panzer Corps (relief force)	14th Panzer Division
South Manstein	1st Panzer Army; Hube	XXXXII Corps; Lieb (encircled)	Corps Detachment B
South Manstein	1st Panzer Army; Hube	XXXXII Corps; Lieb (encircled)	88th Infantry Division
South Manstein	1st Panzer Army; Hube	XXXXII Corps; Lieb (encircled)	1/3 of 168th Infantry Division
South Manstein	1st Panzer Army; Hube	III Panzer Corps (relief force)	1st Panzer Division
South Manstein	1st Panzer Army; Hube	III Panzer Corps (relief force)	16th Panzer Division
South Manstein	1st Panzer Army; Hube	III Panzer Corps (relief force)	17th Panzer Division
South Manstein	1st Panzer Army; Hube	III Panzer Corps (relief force)	1st SS Panzer Division
South Manstein	1st Panzer Army; Hube	III Panzer Corps (relief force)	198th Infantry Division
South Manstein	1st Panzer Army; Hube	III Panzer Corps (relief force)	Bäke Heavy Tank Regiment
South Manstein	1st Panzer Army; Hube	II SS Panzer Corps	5th SS Panzer Division
