= Popůvky =

Popůvky may refer to places in the Czech Republic:

- Popůvky (Brno-Country District), a municipality and village in the South Moravian Region
- Popůvky (Třebíč District), a municipality and village in the Vysočina Region
- Kojetín II-Popůvky, a village and part of Kojetín in the Olomouc Region
