= 111th Tank Division =

Tank division of the Soviet military

- Active: 1941–1955
- Country: Soviet Union
- Branch: Red Army (to 1946); Soviet Army (from 1946)
- Type: Armor
- Garrison/HQ: 76th Rail Siding, Molotov Railway

The 111th Tank Division was a Tank division of the Soviet Union's Red Army and after 1946, the Soviet Army. The division was formed in the summer of 1941 in the Soviet Far East from the tank regiment of a motorized division that had been reorganized into a motor rifle division, and had thus lost its tank regiment. The division never fought in combat and was in reserve during the Soviet invasion of Manchuria. Postwar, the division continued its garrison duty in the Far East. The 111th was renumbered as the 16th Tank Division (Second Formation) in 1955.

== History ==
=== Formation ===
The 111th Tank Division (Military Unit Number 8938) began its formation on 26 July 1941 in Borzya from the 82nd Motorized Division's 123rd Tank Regiment. The 82nd Division was being converted into a motor rifle division, and as a result lost its tank regiment. The division included the following units upon its formation:

- 222nd Tank Regiment (from the 1st and 2nd Battalions of the 123rd)
- 223rd Tank Regiment (from the 3rd and 4th Battalions of the 123rd)
- 111th Motor Rifle Regiment
- 111th Artillery Regiment
- 111th Separate Headquarters Company
- 111th Reconnaissance Battalion
- 111th Separate Anti-Aircraft Artillery Battalion (from the 68th Separate Anti-Aircraft Battalion)
- 111th Medical-Sanitary Battalion
- 111th Motor Transport Battalion
- 111th Repair and Recovery Company
- 100th Field Post Office
- 2120th Field Cash Office of the State Bank

On 1 August, Colonel Ivan Shevnikov became the division commander. The division's formation was completed on 20 August and it became part of the 36th Army.

=== World War II ===
On 9 September, the division was relocated to the 76th Rail Siding on the Molotov Railway (now Mirnaya). On 15 February 1942, Colonel Ivan Troitsky took command of the division. In June 1943, the division was directly subordinated to the Transbaikal Front. On 12 April 1944, division chief of staff Colonel Demyan Timokhin became the division commander. Colonel Ivan Sergeyev commanded the 111th from 31 December 1944 to 3 September 1945. In the summer of 1945, the division was transferred to Enger Shand in eastern Mongolia, where it was held in reserve while most of the rest of the front fought in the Soviet invasion of Manchuria. On 17 August, the division numbered 5,853 men and 696 vehicles of all types, including 137 operational T-34 medium tanks, 22 BT-7 light tanks,17 BA-10 and BA-20 armored cars, 60 76 mm ZiS-3 divisional guns, twelve 76 mm anti-aircraft guns, six 120 mm mortars, 27 82 mm mortars, and ten Lend-Lease M17 anti-aircraft gun half-tracks.

=== Postwar ===
By 9 September 1945 the division had been relocated back to the 76th Rail Siding. On 10 October, it became part of the 6th Guards Tank Army. Around this time, the division also included the following units:

- 222nd Tank Regiment
- 223rd Tank Regiment
- 73rd Tank Regiment
- 165th Heavy Tank/Self-Propelled Gun Regiment
- 111th Motor Rifle Regiment
- 193rd Howitzer Artillery Battalion
- 26th Anti-Aircraft Artillery Regiment
- 111th Motorcycle Battalion
- 74th Guards Mortar Battalion
- 111th Communications Battalion
- 111th Sapper Battalion
- 111th Medical-Sanitary Battalion
- 111th Mobile Tank Repair Base
- 111th Field Auto Repair Base
- 111th Motor Transport Battalion

The division remained as a garrison force in the Far East after the war. It was one of the units of the 6th Guards Tank Army that contributed crews and tanks to the formation of ten separate tank regiments to train People's Liberation Army tankists on the T-34 in November 1950. On 4 March 1955, it was renumbered as the 16th Tank Division.

== Commanders ==
The following officers commanded the division.

- Colonel Ivan Shevnikov (1 August 1941 – 14 February 1942)
- Colonel Ivan Troitsky (15 February 1942 – 11 April 1944)
- Colonel Demyan Timokhin (12 April – 30 December 1944)
- Colonel Ivan Sergeyev (31 December 1944 – 3 September 1945)
