= 16th Tank Division (Soviet Union) =

Tank division of the Soviet military

- Active: 1940–1941 (First Formation) 1955–1957 (Second Formation)
- Country: Soviet Union
- Branch: Red Army
- Type: Armored
- Size: Division
- Engagements: First Formation: World War II: Battle of Uman

The 16th Tank Division was a tank division of the Soviet Union's Red Army and later the Soviet Army, formed twice. The division was first formed during the summer of 1940 at Kotovsk, Ukraine with the 2nd Mechanized Corps. After the German invasion of the Soviet Union began in June 1941, the division was sent into the fighting along with its corps. The division was destroyed along with its corps during the Battle of Uman. The division was reformed in 1955 from the 111th Tank Division in the Soviet Far East, and was disbanded two years later.

== First Formation ==
The 16th Tank Division (Military Unit Number 4488) was first formed in July 1940 from elements of the 173rd Rifle Division at summer camps in Kotovsk, part of the 2nd Mechanized Corps. It was commanded by Colonel Mikhail Myndro, and its chief of staff was Colonel Andrei Kravchenko.

== Second Formation ==
The 16th Tank Division was reformed on 4 March 1955 from the 111th Tank Division at Nalaikh, Mongolia with the 6th Guards Tank Army in the Transbaikal Military District. It included the 133rd Mechanized Regiment, the 165th, 222nd, and 223rd Tank Regiments, and the 73rd Heavy Tank Regiment. In May 1957, the division was reorganized. The 133rd Mechanized Regiment became the 378th Motor Rifle Regiment and the 205th Tank Regiment replaced the 223rd, which transferred to the 22nd Guards Tank Division. The division was disbanded in July 1957.
