= Kiev Military District =

Military district of the Russian Empire and Soviet Union

- Boundaries of the Kiev Military District (in red) on 1 January 1989
- Active: 1862–1992
- Country: Russian Empire (1862–1917); Russian Republic (1917); Ukrainian People's Republic (1918–1919); Russian SFSR (1918–1919); Soviet Union (1939–1941), (1944–1991); Ukraine (1991–1992)
- Type: Military district
- Headquarters: Kiev
- Engagements: Invasion of Poland, Invasion of Romania, World War II

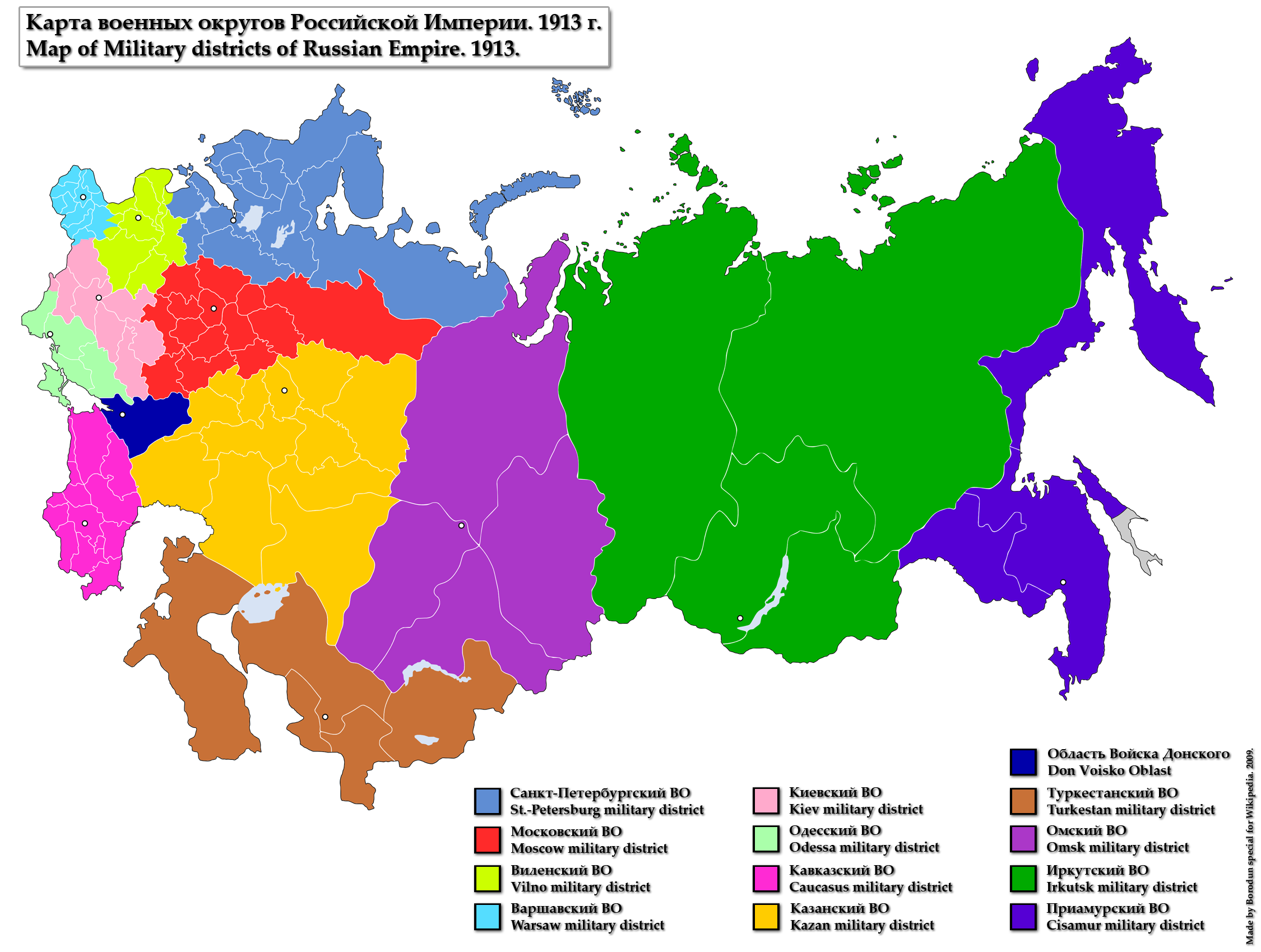
Military Districts of the Russian Empire, 1913

The Kiev Military District (Russian: Киевский военный округ (КВО), romanized: Kiyevskiy voyennyy okrug (KVO); Ukrainian: Червонопрапорний Київський військовий округ, romanized: Chervonoprapornyi Kyivskyi viiskovyi okruh, lit. 'Red Banner Kyiv Military District', abbreviated КВО, KVO) was a military district of the Imperial Russian Army and subsequently of the Red Army and Soviet Armed Forces. It was first formed in 1862, and was headquartered in Kiev (Kyiv) for most of its existence.

== Imperial Russian Army formation ==
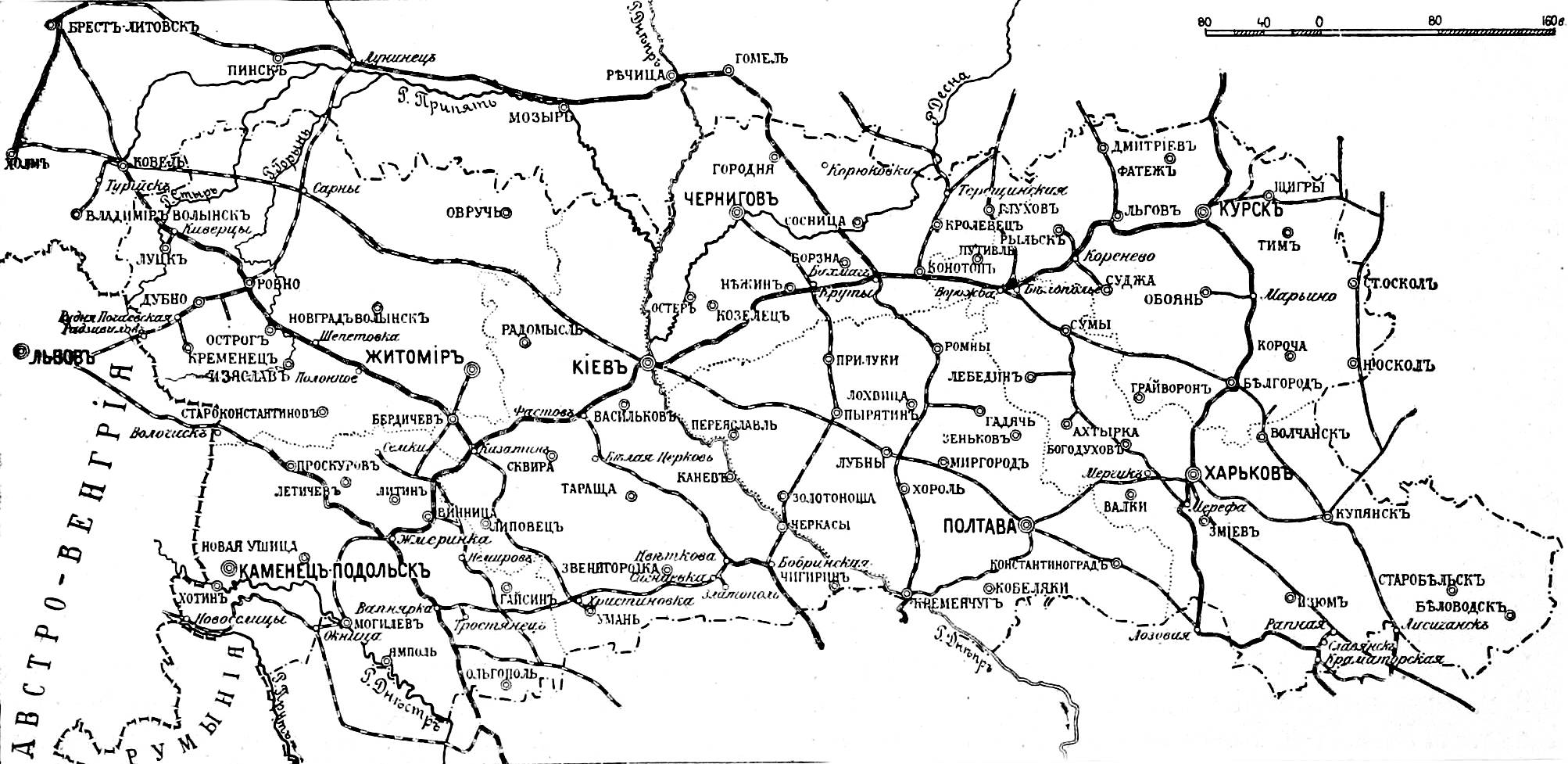
Kiev Military District in 1911–1915

The Kiev Military District was an imperial military district, a territorial division type utilised to provide more efficient management of army units, their training and other operations activities related to combat readiness. The district originally covered the Kiev Governorate, Podolia Governorate (less Balta County), and Volhynia Governorate.

Assigned formations included the 10th Army.

In 1888, the Kharkov Military District was merged into the Kiev Military District.

With the start of World War I the district was transformed into the 3rd Army. In April 1917, Poltava and Kursk governorates were transferred under the administration of the Moscow Military District.

After the October Revolution in Petrograd, the district came under jurisdiction of the Ukrainian People's Republic and existed until the early February 1918 advance of the Petrograd-Moscow Russian Red Guards forces of the Antonov's Task Force that was charged by Vladimir Lenin to "fight counter-revolution in the Southern Russia", but was in fact invading Ukraine in what would become known as the Ukrainian–Soviet War.

The district was not reinstated during the brief Bolshevik period in 1918 nor after the establishment of the independent Ukrainian State.

=== Commanders in the Russian Empire ===
- Lieutenant General Prince Illarion Vasilchikov (July 6, 1862 – November 12, 1862*)
- Lieutenant General Count Adam Rzhevusky (temporary in November 1862)
- General of the infantry Nicholas Annenkov (December 1862? – January 19, 1865)
- General of the artillery Aleksandr Bezak (January 19, 1865 – December 30, 1868*)
- Lieutenant General Nikolai Kozlyaninov (January 6, 1869 – May 1, 1872)
- Lieutenant General Prince Aleksandr Dondukov-Korsakov (temporary January – April 1877)
- Lieutenant General Mikhail Chertkov (temporary September 13, 1877 – April 15, 1878)
- Lieutenant General Mikhail Chertkov (September 15, 1878 – January 13, 1881)
- General of the infantry Alexander Drenteln (January 13, 1881 – July 15, 1888*)
- General of the infantry Fyodor Radetsky (October 31, 1888? – 1889)
- General of the infantry Mikhail Dragomirov (January 1, 1889 – December 24, 1903)
- Lieutenant General Nikolai Kleigels (December 24, 1903 – October 19, 1905)
- Lieutenant General Vladimir Sukhomlinov (October 19, 1905 – December 2, 1908; General of the cavalry from 1906)
- General of the artillery Nikolay Ivanov (December 2, 1908 – July 19, 1914)
- Lieutenant General Nikolai Khodorovich (April 16, 1916 – 1917)

=== Commanders under the Provisional Government ===
- Colonel Konstantin Oberuchev (commissar of Provisional Government, March – May 1917)
- Major General Konstantin Oberuchev (May 1917 – October 17, 1917)
- Lieutenant General Mikhail Kvetsinsky (October 17, 1917 – November 7, 1917)

=== Major conflicts ===
- January Uprising (pro-Polish insurgency)
- Revolution of 1905
- World War I (1914–1917)

== First Ukrainian Army formation ==
=== Commanders ===
- Lieutenant Colonel Viktor Pavlenko (November 14, 1917 – December 13, 1917)
- Captain Mykola Shynkar (December 13, 1917 – 1918)

=== Major conflicts ===
- Bolshevik insurgency (1917)
- Ukrainian–Soviet War (1917–1918)

== First Red Army formation ==
The district was reinstated on March 12, 1919, and then again disbanded on August 23, 1919, with the advance of Denikin's forces.

== Kiev Military Region ==
The Kiev Military Region (oblast) was formed by Denikin's forces on August 31, 1919, but already on December 14, 1919, its forces were retrieved and merged with the Forces of Novorossiysk Region. Commander of the military district was Abram Dragomirov.

== Soviet Armed Forces of Ukraine and Crimea formation ==
The District was formed again in January 1920 as part of the Russian SFSR Armed Forces stationed in Ukraine.

In the early 1920s, the District included the following divisions:

- 3rd Crimea Rifle Division
- 7th Chernigov Rifle Division
- 15th Sivashsk Division
- 24th Samaro-Simbirsk Iron Rifle Division
- 25th Chapaev Rifle Division
- 30th Irkutsk Rifle Division
- 44th Kiev Mountain Rifle Division
- 45th Volhynia Rifle Division
- 51st Perekop Rifle Division

== Ukrainian Military District ==
In April 1922 the Kiev Military District was merged with the Kharkov Military District into the South-Western Military District. In June 1922 it was renamed Ukrainian Military District.

The 6th Rifle Corps was formed on the orders of the Commander of the Armed Forces of Ukraine and Crimea number 627/162 from May 23, 1922, in Kiev, part of Kiev and Kharkov Military District.

=== Commanders ===
- Mikhail Frunze (1922–1924)
- Alexander Yegorov (1924–1925)
- Iona Yakir (1925–1935)

== Second Red Army formation ==
On May 17, 1935 the Ukrainian Military District was split between the Kharkov Military District and the Kiev Military District.

13th Rifle Corps was reformed in the district by a District order of December 1936, and its headquarters was established at Bila Tserkva.

On July 26, 1939, the district was renamed into the Kiev Special Military District.

On February 20, 1941, the district formed the 22nd Mechanized Corps (which had 527 tanks) in the 5th Army (Soviet Union), the 16th Mechanized Corps (which had 372 tanks) in the 12th Army, and the 9th mechanized Corps (had 94 tanks), the 24th mechanized Corps (which had 56 tanks), the 15th mechanized Corps (which had 707 tanks), and the 19th Mechanized Corps (had 274 tanks ) in the reserve of the district. Air-defence forces within the District included the 36th Fighter Aviation Division of the PVO located at Vasylkiv.

When the German Operation Barbarossa began on 22 June 1941, on the basis of the Kiev Special Military District was created the Soviet Southwestern Front that completely integrated the district on September 10, 1941.

=== Commanders ===
- Komandarm 1st rank Iona Yakir (1935–1937)
- Komandarm 1st rank Ivan Fedko (1937–1938)
- Komandarm 2nd rank Semyon Timoshenko (1938–1940)
- General of the Army Georgy Zhukov (1940–1941)
- Colonel General Mikhail Kirponos (1941)
- Lieutenant General Vsevolod Yakovlev (1941)

== Soviet Army formation ==
Kiev Military District
- Active: 25 October 1943 - 1 November 1992
- Country: Soviet Union
- Size: 150,000 (1990)
- Part of: South-Western Strategic Direction
- HQ: Kiev
- Tanks APCs Artillery Helicopters: 1,500; 1,500; 700; 100
- Engagements: World War II

The District was formed again on 25 October 1943, with the Headquarters in Kiev. In June 1946, seven oblasts of the disbanded Kharkov Military District were added to the Kiev Military District. The district now included the oblasts (provinces) of Kiev, Cherkasy, Uman, Voroshilovgrad (historically and now Luhansk), Dnipropetrovsk (now Dnipro), Poltava, Stalino (now Donetsk), Sumy, Kharkiv and Chernihiv.

Units stationed in the District were the 1st Guards Army and 6th Guards Tank Army. 69th Air Army was active from the early 1950s to at least 1964 in the district (see ru:Колесник, Василий Артёмович). In 1959, the 17th Air Army was relocated to the District from Mongolia to provide air support. The 60th Corps of the 8th Air Defense Army provided air defence for the District.

The 43rd Rocket Army of the Strategic Rocket Forces was formed at Vinnytsia within the District's boundaries in 1960. It comprised the 19th Rocket Division (Khmelnytskyi), 37th Guards Rocket Division (Lutsk), 43rd Rocket Division (Kremenchuk), 44th Rocket Division (Kolomyia, Ivano-Frankivsk Oblast), and the 46th Rocket Division (Pervomaisk, Mykolaiv Oblast). The 43rd Rocket Army's last commander was Colonel-General Vladimir Alekseevich Mikhtyuk, who served from 10 January 1991 to 8 May 1996, when it was finally disbanded.

Also in the district in 1988 was the 72nd Central Artillery Weapons Base (Центральная артиллерийская база вооружения (средств управления)) at Krasnograd.

From 1980 to 1988 the 17th Air Army was known as the Air Forces of the Kiev Military District (VVS KVO). Then-Colonel Nikolay Antoshkin was chief of staff of the VVS KVO at the time of the Chernobyl disaster, and led helicopter operations to respond to the accident, dropping tonnes of sand and lead onto the exposed reactor core. He was quickly promoted to general-mayor (one star) rank, and awarded the Hero of the Soviet Union.

In 1991 the district included the 6th Guards Tank Army (at Dnipropetrovsk), 1st Guards Army (Chernihiv), 36th Motor Rifle Division (Artemivsk [Bakhmut]), 48th Motor Rifle Division (Chuhuiv), 48th Guards Tank Training Division (Desna), 9th independent Special Forces Brigade GRU (activated 15 October 1962 in Kirovohrad [Kropyvnytsnkyi], formed up 31 December 1962, remaining in Ukraine in 1992), 17th Air Army, and the 60th Air Defence Corps of the 8th Air Defence Army (Soviet Air Defence Forces). Among the district's air force units were the Chernihiv Higher Military Aviation School of Pilots at Chernihiv.

Also located within the district's boundaries but responsible to HQ South-Western Strategic Direction was the 23rd independent Landing-Assault Brigade (effectively an airmobile brigade), at Kremenchuk, Poltava Oblast.

In 1991, Colonel General Viktor S. Chechevatov was dismissed as District commander for refusing to take an oath of loyalty to Ukraine. The District was disbanded after the dissolution of the Soviet Union, by 1 November 1992, and its structure utilized as the basis for the new Ukrainian Ministry of Defense and General Staff.

=== Commanders ===
- Lieutenant General Viktor Kosyakin (1943 – 1944)
- Lieutenant General Vasyl Herasymenko (1944 – 1945)
- Colonel General Andrei Grechko (9 July 1945 – 25 May 1953)
- Marshal of the Soviet Union Vasily Chuikov (26 May 1953 – April 1960)
- General of the Army Pyotr Koshevoy (April 1960 – January 1965)
- General of the Army Ivan Yakubovsky (January 1965 – April 1967)
- Colonel General Viktor Kulikov (April 1967 – 1969)
- Colonel General Grigoriy Salmanov (April 1969 – 1975)
- Colonel General Ivan Gerasimov (1975 – 1984)
- Colonel General Vladimir Osipov (1984 – 1989)
- Colonel General Boris Gromov (1989 – December 1990)
- Colonel General Viktor Chechevatov (January 1991 – 1992)

== Second Ukrainian Army formation ==
=== Commanders ===
- Lieutenant General Valentyn Boryskin (1992)

== See also ==
- Operational Command North, Ukraine
