= 42nd Guards Tank Division =

Tank division of the Soviet military

The 42nd Guards Priluki Order of Lenin Red Banner Order of Bogdan Khmelnitsky Tank Division (Military Unit Number 29410) was an armoured division of the Soviet Ground Forces, active from 1957 to 1990.

The division was formed with the Western Front in July 1942 from the 1st Guards Red Banner Rifle Brigade as the 1st Guards Red Banner Rifle Division. The division in the process of formation was temporarily called the '1st Guards Red Banner Rifle Division' (formed 1942) from July 6, 1942, to September 13, 1942. Units of the division included the 1st, 2nd, and 3rd Guards Rifle Regiments.

On 13 September 1942 the division became the 42nd Guards Red Banner Rifle Division. On 1 October 1942 it was part of the Western Front reserves; by 1 November 1942 it had been shifted into 20th Army, seemingly as part of the Battles of Rzhev. It eventually fought at Stalingrad, Kursk, Kiev, Iasi, and Budapest; gained the 'Prilukskaya' honorific 13 February 1944 after the liberation of Pryluky; and it was serving with the 1st Guards Cavalry-Mechanized Group of the 2nd Ukrainian Front at the end of the war in May 1945. The division also served with the 5th; 31st; 5th Guards; 40th Army (September — November 1943 and December 1943 — March 1945); and the 53rd Armies by the end of the war.

The 42nd Gv Tank Division was formed from the 42 GRD on 4 June 1957 at Hvardiiske, Dnepropetrovsk Oblast. The town was established around the unit's base in 1957, and named for the Guards designation of the division. It was part of the 6th Guards Tank Army throughout its existence.

The division became the 6299th Base for Storage of Weapons and Equipment (VKhVT) on 1 September 1990; probably actually the 6299th Guards VKhVT.
