= Vasile Atanasiu =

Romanian general (1886–1964)

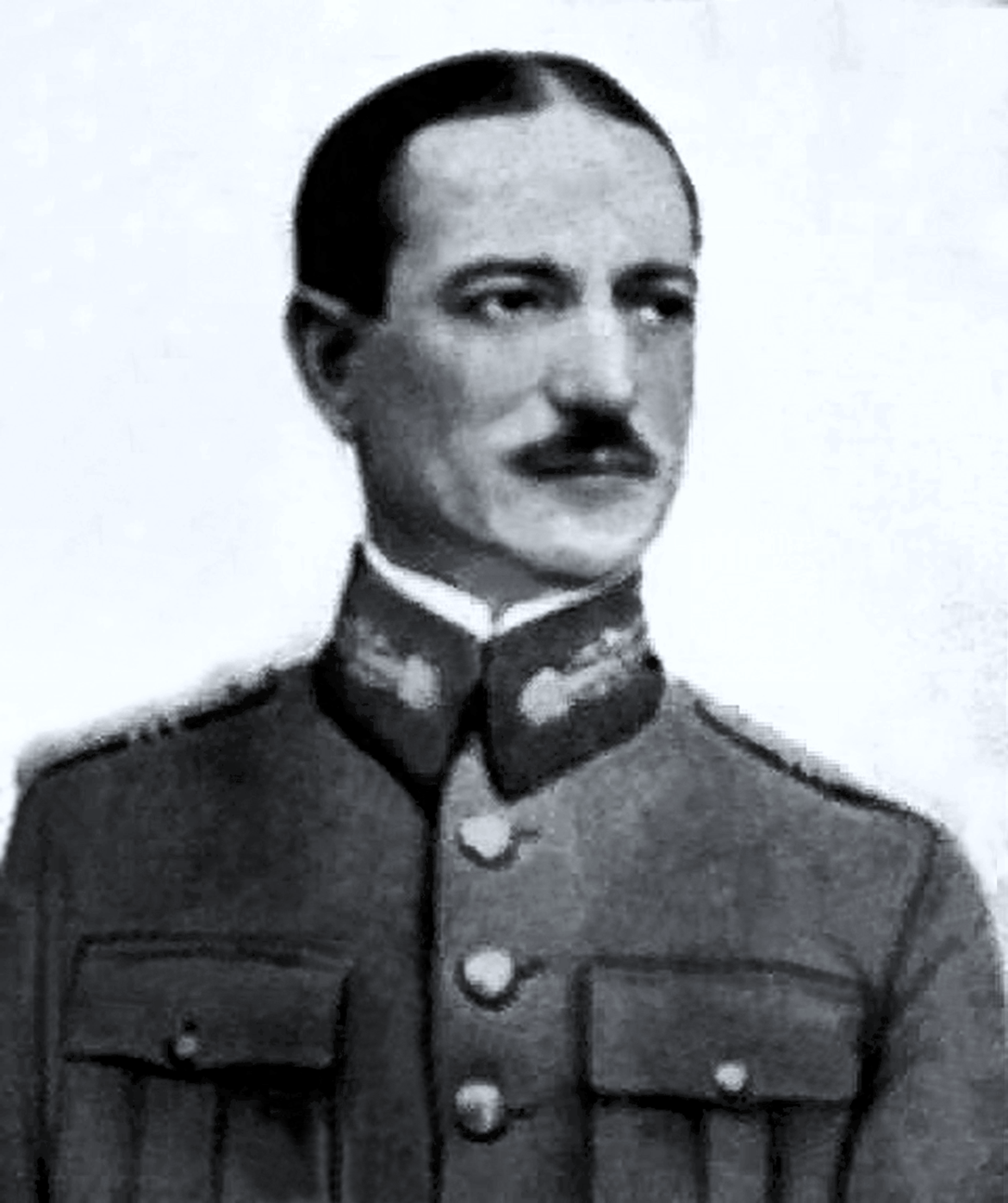
- Born: April 25, 1886; Târgoviște, Romania
- Died: June 6, 1964 (aged 78); Bucharest, Romania
- Occupation: Army General
- Known for: World War II veteran

Vasile Atanasiu (April 25, 1886 – June 6, 1964) was a Romanian general in World War II.

== Biography ==
He was born in Târgoviște, Romania, in 1886, in a Greek-Romanian family, the son of Ștefan and Paulina Atanasiu. He graduated from the "Military School of Artillery, Combat Engineering and Navy officers" in 1907, with the rank of second lieutenant, being promoted lieutenant in 1910, captain in 1915, and major in 1917 during World War I. After the war he attended the Higher War School in Bucharest, graduating in 1920, when he was advanced to the rank of lieutenant colonel.

After reaching the rank of colonel in 1928, and of brigadier general in 1935, Atanasiu was advanced to divisional general in 1940, before the beginning of World War II and to lieutenant general in 1942.

He served as Commander of the 2nd Army Corps in 1941, and moved to the 3d Army Corps which he commanded from June 22, 1941, to March 20, 1943. In this capacity he led the Corps in the military actions for the liberation of Bessarabia in the battle for the beachhead of Albița on the Prut River, and then in the advance to the Dniester at Tiraspol. He was then in command of the corps on the front line from Karpovo to Dalnik during the Siege of Odessa.

In 1943 he was appointed Inspector-General of Artillery, a position which he held from March 20, 1943, to February 12, 1945.

After King Michael's Coup in August 1944, he took command of the 1st Romanian Army, taking part in the battles on the Czechoslovak front in the Javorina, between the rivers Hron and Morava and thereafter in Bohemia, during the Bratislava–Brno Offensive. He was promoted to general (general de armată) on April 11, 1945. Atanasiu retired in 1948 and died in Bucharest in 1964.

== Awards ==
During his career, Atanasiu received the following awards and medals.

- Romanian awards
  - Order of Michael the Brave, 3rd class; 17 October 1941
  - Order of Michael the Brave, 3rd class; 4 August 1945
  - Order of the Star of Romania, Commander class; 8 June 1940
  - Order of the Star of Romania, Officer class
  - Order of the Crown, Commander class
- Czechoslovak award
  - Order of the White Lion
- Soviet awards
  - Order of Suvorov
  - Medal "For the Victory over Germany in the Great Patriotic War 1941–1945"
