= Cherkaske, Dnipropetrovsk Oblast =

Rural locality in Dnipropetrovsk Oblast, Ukraine

Cherkaske Черкаське
- Rural settlement
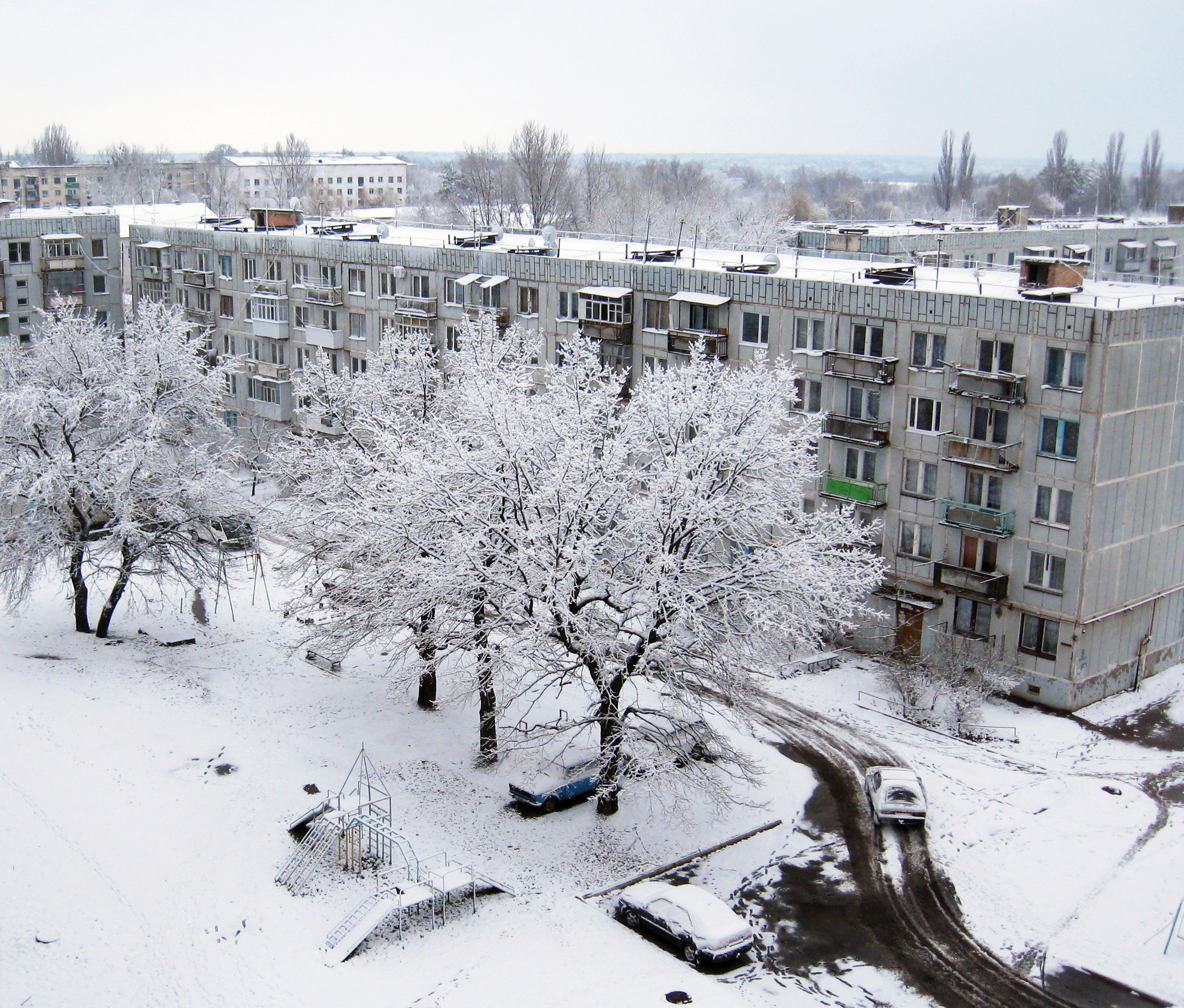

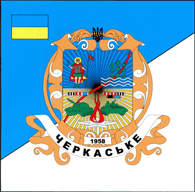
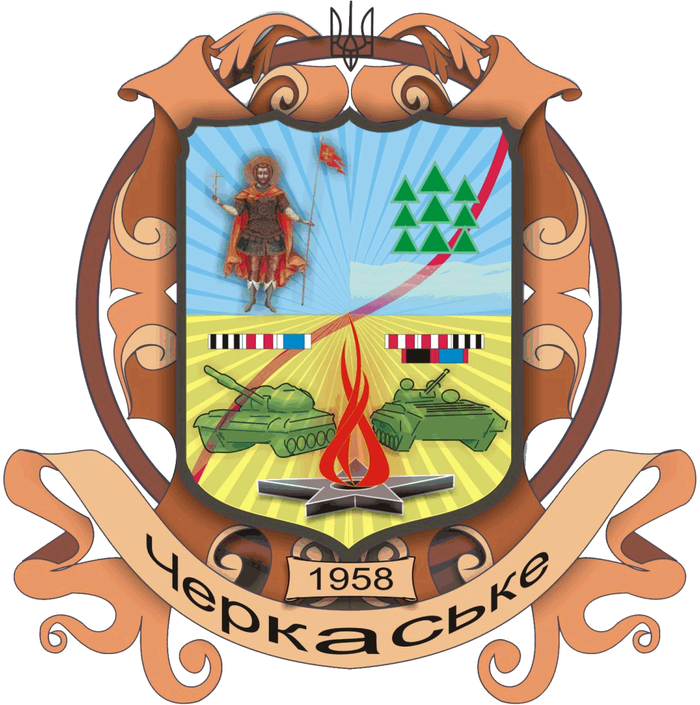
- Flag Seal

- Location within Ukraine Location within Dnipropetrovsk Oblast
- Coordinates: 48°42′15″N 35°23′00″E
- Country: Ukraine
- Oblast: Dnipropetrovsk Oblast
- Raion: Samar Raion
- Urban-type settlement: 1958

Population (2022)
  - Total: 4,117

Cherkaske (Ukrainian: Черкаське) is a rural settlement in Samar Raion, Dnipropetrovsk Oblast, eastern Ukraine. It hosts the administration of Cherkaske settlement hromada, one of the hromadas of Ukraine. Population: 4,117 (2022 estimate).

It is home to the 93rd Mechanized Brigade of the Ukrainian Ground Forces. Cherkaske is located in close proximity to another military townlet, Zarichne.

== History ==
During the Cold War, the 22nd Guards Tank Division was based in Cherkaske. The settlement originated in 1949 as the military townlet of Nove, where a training battalion was originally stationed, and was renamed in 1957 after the Cherkassy honorific title of the 22nd Guards Tank Division.

Until 26 January 2024, Cherkaske was designated urban-type settlement. On this day, a new law entered into force which abolished this status, and Cherkaske became a rural settlement.
