= 22nd Guards Tank Division =

Tank division of the Soviet military

- Active: 1957–1990
- Country: Soviet Union
- Branch: Soviet Army
- Type: Armor
- Part of: 6th Guards Tank Army
- Garrison/HQ: Cherkaske
- Decorations: Order of the Red Banner; Order of Bogdan Khmelnitsky
- Battle honours: Cherkasy

The 22nd Guards Tank Division (Russian: 22-я гвардейская танковая дивизия) was a tank division of the Soviet Army. The division traced its lineage back to the World War II 7th Guards Airborne Division (First formation), which became the 115th Guards Rifle Division after the end of the war. In 1957, the 115th became the 22nd Guards Tank Division. The division was based in the military townlet of Novoye, which was quickly renamed Cherkaske after the Cherkassy honorific title of the division. From May 1957, it was part of the 6th Guards Tank Army, relocated from the Transbaikal. The division's 223rd Tank Regiment was transferred from the 16th Tank Division of the 6th Guards Tank Army, formerly stationed in Mongolia. The division was maintained as a high strength cadre division, not ready for combat. It was disbanded in 1990 to make room for the 93rd Guards Motor Rifle Division, which had been withdrawn from Hungary.

Future Army General Yury Yakubov commanded the division's 317th Guards Tank Regiment between 1979 and 1982, then served as deputy division commander until 1984.

== History ==
In December 1945 the division arrived in Cherkassy from Austria. On the basis of a directive dated 3 May 1946, the 115th Guards Rifle Division was reorganized as the 14th Separate Guards Rifle Brigade to include the 5th, 21st, and 37th Separate Guards Rifle Battalions and the 470th Separate Guards Artillery Regiment, under the command of Major General Ivan Osipovich Naryshkin. In March 1947 the brigade was disbanded. The personnel and equipment were transferred to the 20th Guards Rifle Corps, and the 43rd Separate Roslavl Red Banner Rifle Brigade of the 14th Guards Rifle Corps was redesignated as the 14th Separate Guards Rifle Brigade, a shift completed on 20 March 1947. The reformed brigade was based at Dnipropetrovsk, commanded by Colonel Aleksandr Gavrilovich Pankov. In a reorganization that was completed on 15 November 1953, the brigade was reorganized as the 115th Guards Rifle Division to include the following elements, under Major General Kirill Yakovlevich Tymchik:

- 360th Guards Red Banner Order of Kutuzov Rifle Regiment
- 365th Guards Budapest Order of Kutuzov Rifle Regiment
- 67th Separate Vienna Orders of Suvorov and Kutuzov Rifle Regiment
- 470th Guards Orders of Kutuzov and Aleksandr Nevsky Gun Artillery Regiment
- 269th Separate Guards Order of Bogdan Khmelnitsky Tank-Self Propelled Artillery Battalion
- 166th Separate Destroyer Anti-Tank Battalion
- 385th Separate Anti-Aircraft Artillery Battalion
- 566th Separate Guards Signals Battalion
- 277th Separate Guards Sapper Battalion
- Separate Guards Reconnaissance Company

In May 1957, the 115th Guards Rifle Division was reorganized as the 22nd Guards Tank Division, to include the following elements:

- 223rd Tank Regiment
- 302nd Guards Tank Regiment
- 317th Guards Heavy Tank Regiment
- 360th Guards Motor Rifle Regiment
- 470th Guards Artillery Regiment
- 67th Separate Tank Destroyer Company
- 2059th Anti-Artillery Regiment
- 11th Separate Guards Reconnaissance Company
- 566th Separate Guards Signals Battalion
- 277th Separate Guards Sapper Battalion
- 215th Separate Chemical Defense Company
- Division Artillery Headquarters Battery
- 183rd Separate Medical Company
- 109th Separate Auto Transport Company
- 477th Artillery Workshop
- 382nd Armored Workshop
- 475th Vehicle Repair Workshop
- 109th Separate Training Tank Battalion

The 223rd Tank Regiment of the 16th Tank Division was transferred to the 22nd Guards to become its third divisional tank regiment, and relocated from Mongolia in accordance with a directive of 23 October 1958 without its tanks, equipment and armament. It totaled 296 personnel of which 96 were officers.

In accordance with a directive of 12 March 1962, the division was reorganized along a now TO&E, shtat 10/240, with a total strength of 3,226 personnel of which 633 were officers. As a result, the three division workshops were disbanded and replaced by the 126th Equipment Maintenance and Recovery Battalion. The 189th Rocket Artillery Battery was also formed. The division thus included the following elements (Military Unit Number in parentheses):

- Division headquarters (36895) (146 men)
- 223rd Tank Regiment (38121) (533 men)
- 302nd Guards Tank Regiment (55363) (533 men)
- 317th Guards Tank Regiment (41437) (533 men)
- 360th Guards Motor Rifle Regiment (32093) (349 men)
- 865th Guards Howitzer Artillery Regiment (89529) (171 men)
- 945th Anti-Aircraft Artillery Regiment (21501) (177 men)
- 652nd Separate Rocket Battalion (96513) (102 men)
- 189th Separate Rocket Battery (22179)
- 72nd Separate Guards Reconnaissance Battalion (87024) (75 men)
- 566th Separate Guards Signals Battalion (62802)
- 277th Separate Guards Sapper Battalion (83381)

December 1985 data recorded the division as totalling 2,550 men with 322 T-64A, twelve BMP-1, three BTR-60, and 108 122mm M-30. It was disbanded in 1990 to make room for the 93rd Guards Motor Rifle Division, which had been withdrawn from Hungary.

== 1989 Structure ==
All units were at Cherkaske. Military Unit Number in parentheses.

- Division headquarters (36895)
- 360th Guards Motor Rifle Regiment (32093)
- 223rd Tank Regiment (38121)
- 302nd Guards Tank Regiment (55363)
- 317th Guards Tank Regiment (41437)
- 871st Guards Self-Propelled Artillery Regiment (89529)
- 1069th Anti-Aircraft Rocket Regiment (63741)
- Separate Rocket Battalion (61528)
- Separate Reconnaissance Battalion
- 277th Separate Guards Engineer-Sapper Battalion
- 566th Separate Guards Signal Battalion (62802)
- Separate Chemical Defense Company
- Separate Repair and Reconstruction Battalion
- Separate Medical Battalion
- Separate Material Support Battalion (87024)
- Military Counterintelligence Department
