= Valentyn Boryskin =

Ukrainian army officer

- Валентин Данилович Борискін
- Born: Valentyn Danylovych Boryskin; 6 February 1942; Ozerki, Russian SFSR, Soviet Union
- Died: 8 January 2013 (aged 70); Kyiv, Ukraine
- Military career
- Allegiance: Soviet Union; Ukraine
- Branch: Ukrainian Ground Forces
- Service years: 1961-1997
- Rank: Lieutenant General
- Commands: Kyiv Military District (1992)

Valentyn Danylovych Boryskin (Ukrainian: Валентин Данилович Борискін; 6 February 1942 - 8 January 2013), was a Soviet and later Ukrainian Army officer who was the commander of the Kyiv Military District in post-independence Ukraine in 1992.

He was the first head of the Academy of the Armed Forces of Ukraine from 1992 to 1997. He was a candidate of Military Sciences, and a lecturer. He was an honorary member of the Military Intelligence Veterans Fund of Ukraine.

== Biography ==
Valentyn Boryskin was born in Ozerki, Ryazan Oblast on 6 February 1942. His father, Danil Nikitovich, a mathematics teacher, volunteered for the front in 1941, commanded a mortar battery and died at the front (according to some sources, a month after the birth of his son, according to others, in the spring of 1943).

After graduating from high school, Boryskin worked for some time as a physical education and military teacher in a high school. From 1961 to 1963, he served in tank troops in the Group of Soviet Forces in Germany. In 1966, he graduated from the Kharkov Guards Higher Tank Command School. After graduating from the school he held the positions of tank platoon commander and tank company commander in the Group of Soviet Forces in Germany. In 1968, he took part in Operation Danube, the Warsaw Pact invasion of Czechoslovakia. He served in the positions of tank platoon commander, tank company commander, deputy unit commander, unit commander.

From 1970 to 1973 Boryskin studied at the Malinovsky Military Armored Forces Academy, was a Suvorov scholarship recipient, and graduated from the academy with a gold medal. From 1973 to 1979, he served in the Byelorussian Military District as the deputy commander and commander of a motorized rifle regiment, deputy commander of the 120th Guards Motor Rifle Division. From 1979 to 1983, he was the commander of the 19th Guards Tank Division of the Southern Group of Forces.

In 1983, Boryskin was awarded the rank of major general. After graduating from the Academy of the General Staff that same year, he was appointed to the post of Chief of Staff — First Deputy Commander of the Army of the Baltic Military District, and was sent to the 11th Combined Arms Army of the Baltic Military District as chief of staff. He was a participant in the response to the Chernobyl disaster. From May 1988 to July 1989, he was the commander of the 6th Guards Tank Army of the Kyiv Military District.

From July 1989 to December 1991, Boryskin was the Chief of Staff of the Kyiv Military District. In January 1992, Boryskin was appointed the commander of the Kyiv Military District in post-independence Ukraine. In November 1992, he became the head of the Academy of the Armed Forces of Ukraine. He left that position in January 1997. In 1998, he became professor at the Department of Intelligence at the National Defence University of Ukraine.

Boryskin died on 8 January 2013 in Kyiv. He was buried on 11 January at the Baikove Cemetery.

== Family ==
Boryskin had two sons, Yuriy (1960-2021) and Oleksandr.

Yuriy graduated from the Frunze Military Academy in 1991, and served in the Ukrainian Army, with honors. He died in hospital of COVID-19 in November 2021. He was married, and had a daughter and a son. Oleksandr, who is a lieutenant colonel, serves in the troops of the State Emergency Service of Ukraine.
