= Ořechov (Brno-Country District) =

- Municipality
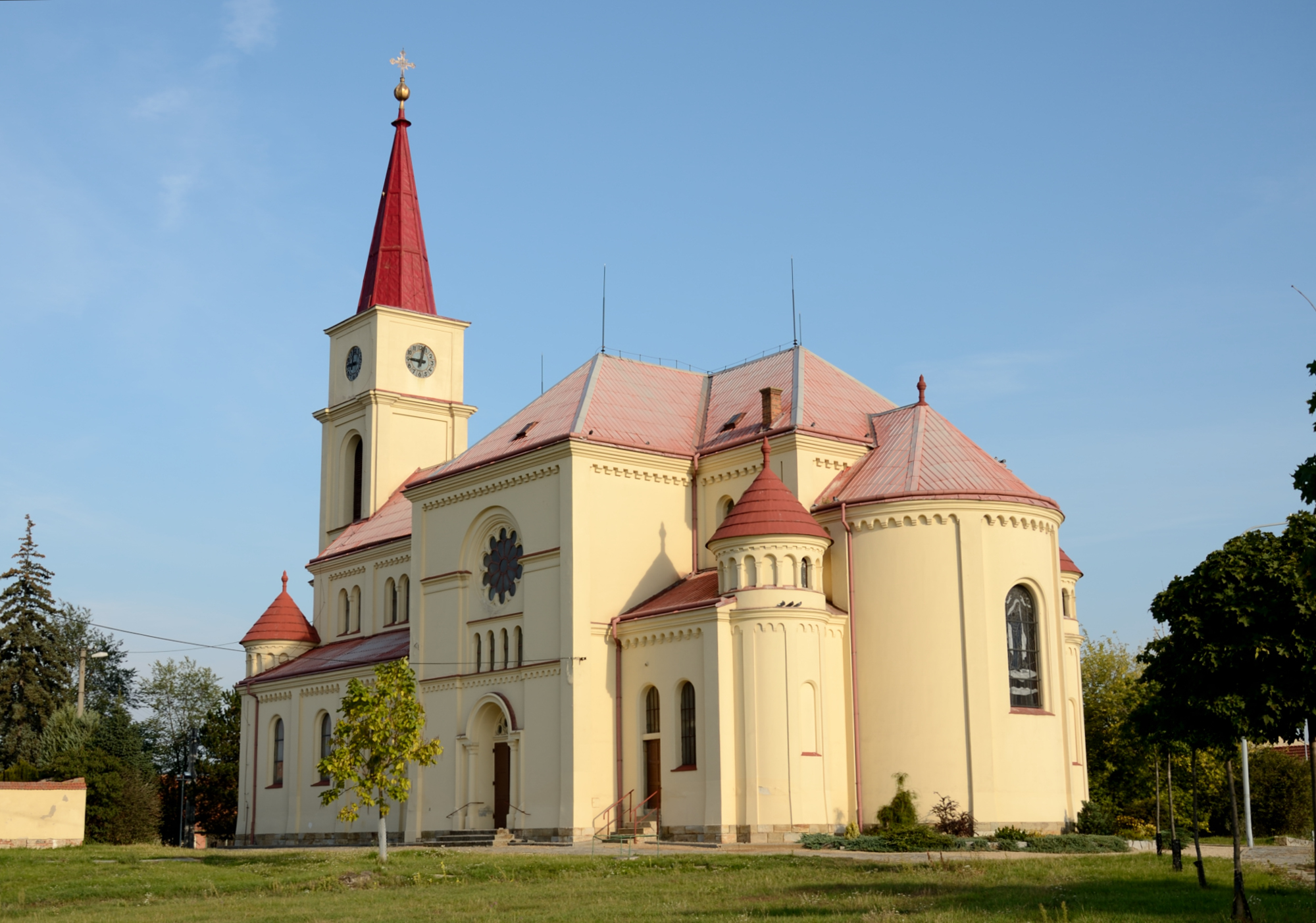
- Church of All Saints

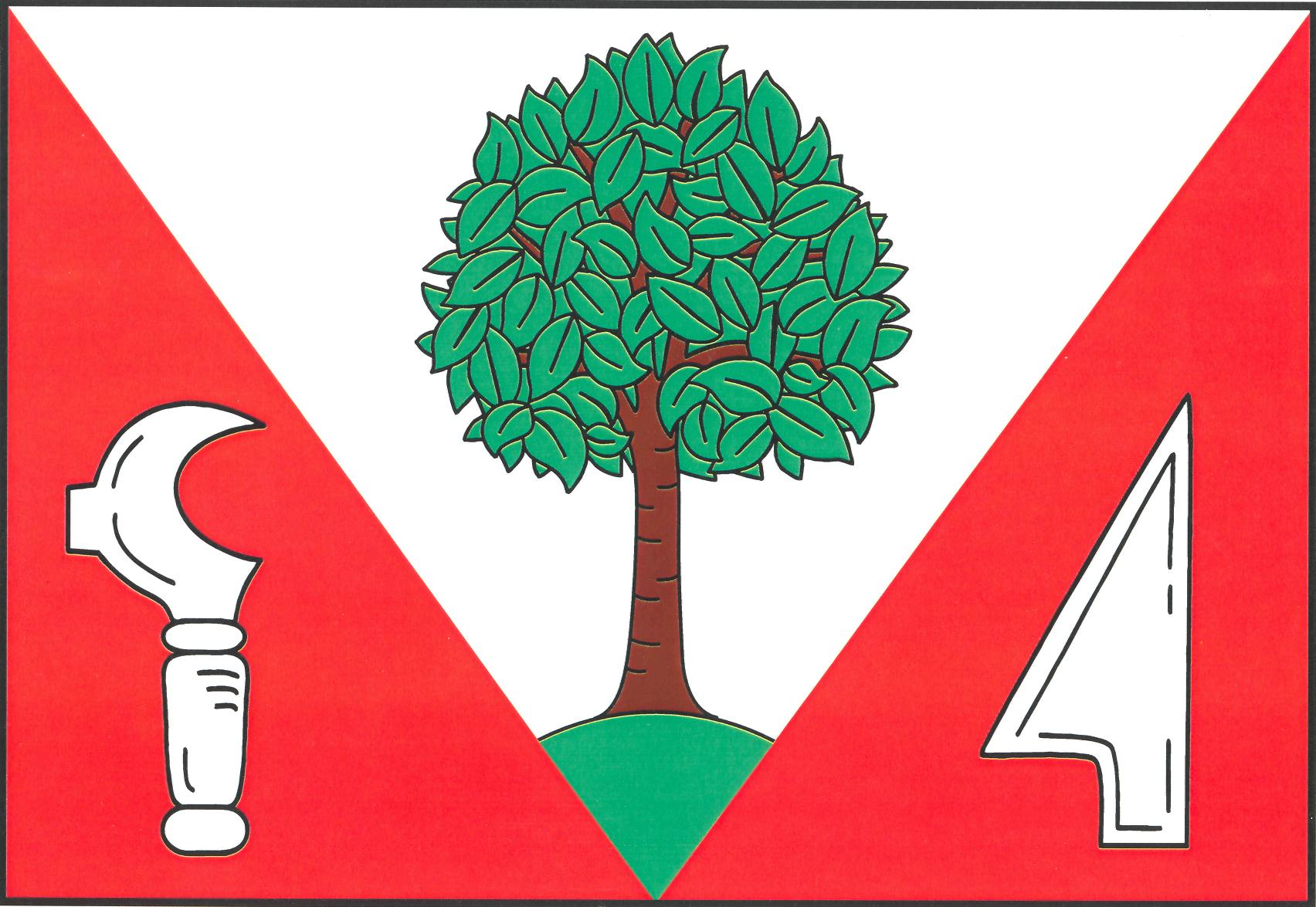
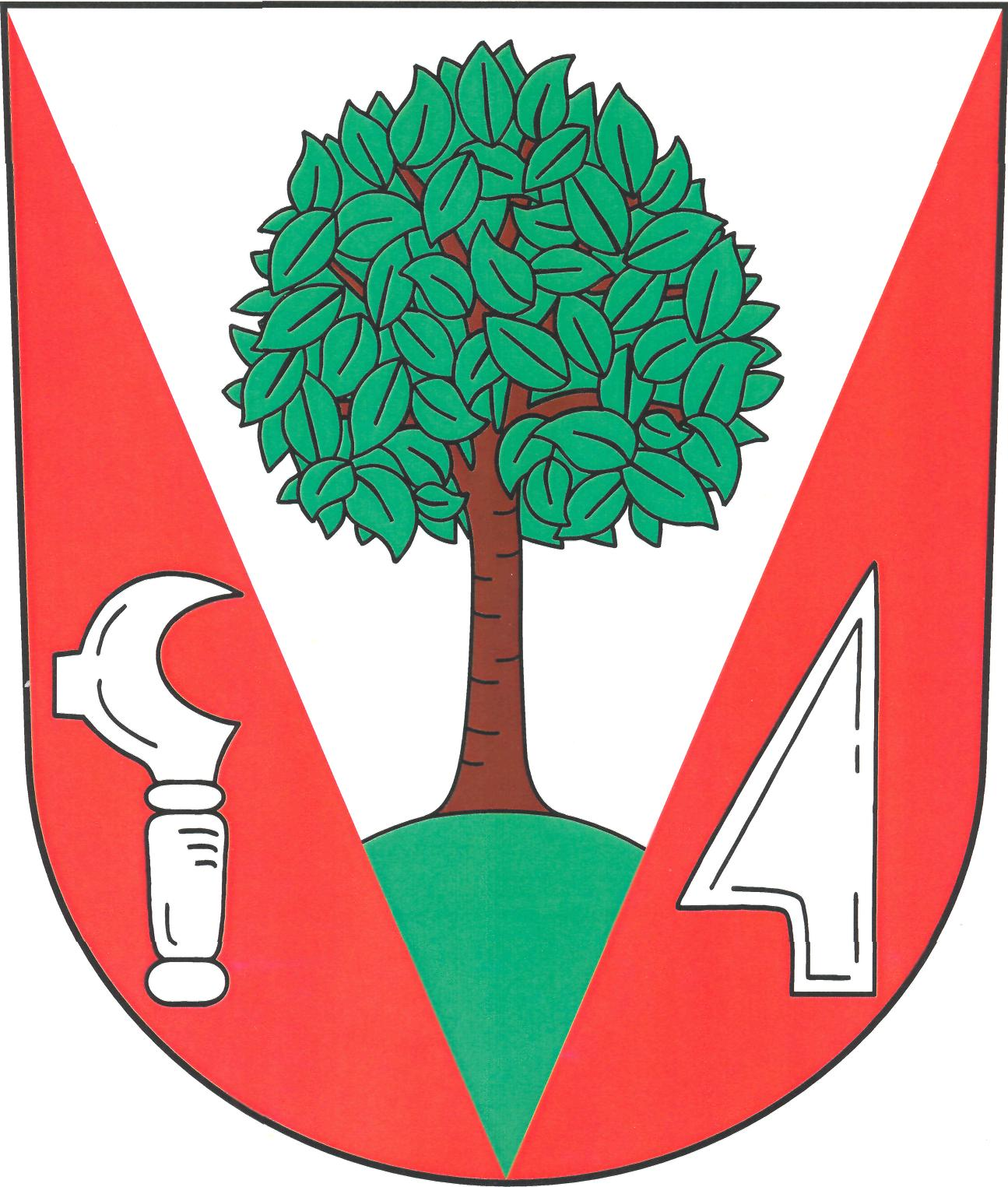
- Flag Coat of arms

- Location in the Czech Republic
- Coordinates: 49°6′40″N 16°31′24″E
- Country: Czech Republic
- Region: South Moravian
- District: Brno-Country
- First mentioned: 1234

Area
  - Total: 19.68 km^{2} (7.60 sq mi)
- Elevation: 302 m (991 ft)

Population (2026-01-01)
  - Total: 2,936
  - Density: 149.2/km^{2} (386.4/sq mi)
- Time zone: UTC+1 (CET)
  - Summer (DST): UTC+2 (CEST)
- Postal code: 664 44
- Website: www.orechovubrna.cz

Ořechov (German: Urhau) is a municipality and village in Brno-Country District in the South Moravian Region of the Czech Republic. It has about 2,900 inhabitants.

== Geography ==
Ořechov is located about 11 kilometres (7 mi) southwest of Brno. It lies in the Bobrava Highlands. The highest point is at 347 m (1,138 ft) above sea level. The municipality is situated on the right bank of the Bobrava River.

== History ==
The first written mention of Ořechov is in a deed of the Rajhrad monastery from 1234. There were originally three villages in the area of today's municipality: Ořechov, Ořechovičky and Tikovice. In 1378, the area was divided into several parts, which had different owners. Most of the area was owned by the Royal Capital Chapter of St. Peter and Paul in Brno. The villages recovered, but further damage occurred during the Battle of Austerlitz in 1805 and during the Austro-Prussian War in 1866.

On 18–24 April 1945, Ořechov was the site of one of the largest tank battles of World War II, when the armies led by Ferdinand Schörner on the German side and Rodion Malinovsky on the Soviet side clashed. 1,452 members of the Red Army fell during the fighting.

During the first half of the 20th century, the villages of Ořechov, Ořechovičky and Tikovice urbanistically fused. In 1946, they were merged into one municipality. Today they form one indivisible unit.

== Demographics ==
Historical population

Year	Pop.	±%
1869	1,932	—
1880	2,081	+7.7%
1890	2,317	+11.3%
1900	2,365	+2.1%
1910	2,657	+12.3%

Year	Pop.	±%
1921	2,672	+0.6%
1930	2,704	+1.2%
1950	2,208	−18.3%
1961	2,350	+6.4%
1970	2,444	+4.0%

Year	Pop.	±%
1980	2,474	+1.2%
1991	2,353	−4.9%
2001	2,353	+0.0%
2011	2,440	+3.7%
2021	2,754	+12.9%

Source: Censuses

== Transport ==
There are no railways or major roads passing through the municipality.

== Culture ==
Every year, the municipality organises celebrations of the anniversary of liberation by the Red Army. As part of these celebrations, a reconstruction of the tank battle is taking place with the participation of historical tanks.

== Sights ==
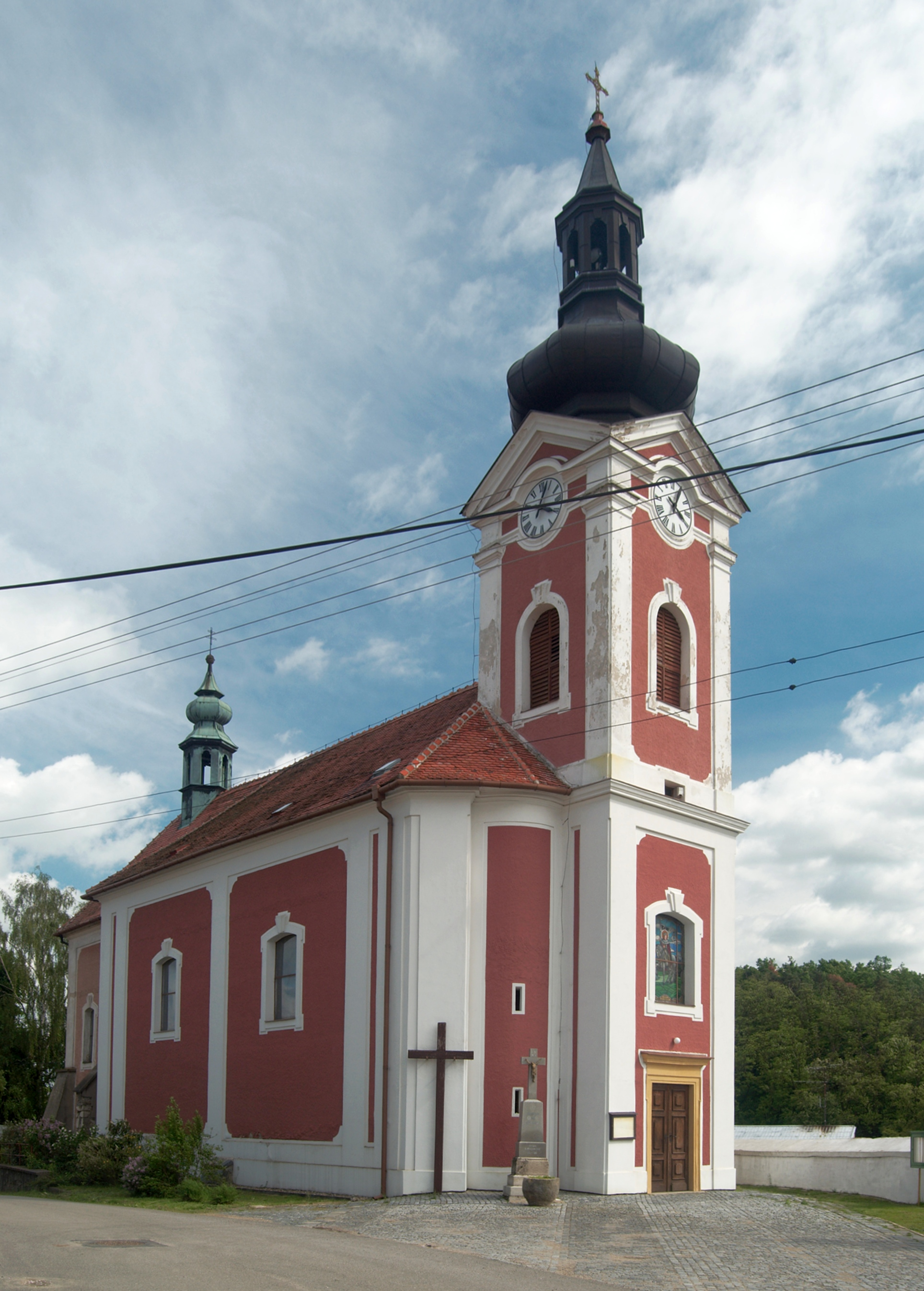
Church of Saint George

The Church of Saint George has a medieval core from the 12th or 13th century and belongs to the oldest churches in Moravia. It was rebuilt to its present Baroque form in 1725 by Moritz Grimm.

The Church of All Saints is a large Neo-Romanesque building. It was built in 1899–1900 on the site of an old demolished church, first documented in 1317.

A cultural monument is the Red Army Cemetery, where members of the Red Army killed in the 1945 tank battle were buried.
