= Andrey Kravchenko (general) =

Soviet military commander

Andrei Grigoryevich Kravchenko
- Russian: Андре́й Григо́рьевич Кра́вченко; Ukrainian: Андрій Григорович Кравченко
- Born: 18 November [O.S. 30 November] 1899; Sulimin, Poltava Governorate, Russian Empire (now Sulymivka, Kyiv Oblast, Ukraine)
- Died: 18 October 1963 (aged 63); Moscow, Soviet Union
- Burial place: Novodevichy Cemetery, Moscow
- Military career
- Allegiance: Soviet Union
- Branch: Red Army; Soviet Army
- Service years: 1918–1955
- Rank: Colonel General of Tank Troops
- Commands: 31st Tank Brigade; 2nd Tank Corps; 4th Tank Corps / 5th Guards Tank Corps; 6th (Guards) Tank Army
- Conflicts: Russian Civil War; Polish–Soviet War; Winter War; World War II; Eastern Front; Soviet invasion of Manchuria
- Awards: Hero of the Soviet Union (twice); Order of Lenin (twice); Order of the Red Banner (four times); Order of Suvorov, 1st class (twice)

Andrey Grigoryevich Kravchenko (Russian: Андре́й Григо́рьевич Кра́вченко; Ukrainian: Андрій Григорович Кравченко; 18 November [O.S. 30 November] 1899 – 18 October 1963) was a Soviet colonel general of tank troops and twice Hero of the Soviet Union. During World War II, he commanded the 4th Tank Corps, later the 5th Guards Tank Corps, at Stalingrad and Kursk, and from 1944 the 6th (later 6th Guards) Tank Army in eastern Europe and in the Soviet invasion of Manchuria.

== Early life and Civil War ==
Kravchenko was born on 30 November 1899 (18 November Old Style) at the farmstead of Sulimin in the Poltava Governorate, now the village of Sulymivka in the Yahotyn district of Kyiv Oblast, into a poor peasant family. In 1916–1917, he worked for a construction office in Kyiv.

In November 1918, Kravchenko volunteered for the Red Army and served as a private in the Tarashcha Regiment of the 1st Ukrainian Soviet Division under Nikolai Shchors, which became the 44th Rifle Division in 1919. From March 1920, he was a junior commander in the 60th Rifle Regiment of the 7th Vladimir Rifle Division. During the Russian Civil War, he fought against the forces of Anton Denikin and Symon Petliura and against Polish troops in the Polish–Soviet War.

== Interwar service ==
In April 1921, Kravchenko entered military school, and in 1923 he graduated from the Poltava infantry school. From 1923 to 1925, he served in the 2nd Signals Battalion of the Separate Caucasus Army in Tbilisi, rising from squad leader to company commander. He joined the Communist Party in 1925. In 1928, he graduated from the Frunze Military Academy, and in July of that year he became chief of staff of the 21st Rifle Regiment of the 7th Chernigov Rifle Division.

From September 1930, Kravchenko taught tactics at the advanced courses for armoured troops in Leningrad, becoming head of a course there in November 1931. In February 1932, he was sent on a foreign assignment. From November 1933, he was chief of staff of the advanced training courses in Kazan. In October 1934, he was expelled from the party and moved to a lower post for a disciplinary offence involving drunken rowdiness, and he was readmitted to the party in 1939. From February 1935, he taught tactics at the tank school in Saratov, and from May of that year he headed its combined-arms department. He was promoted to major in 1936 and to colonel in January 1939.

In May 1939, Kravchenko became an officer for special assignments on the staff of the Volga Military District, and in August 1939 he was made chief of staff of the 61st Rifle Division. From December 1939, he was chief of staff of the 173rd Motorised Rifle Division, with which he fought in the Winter War against Finland and took part in the occupation of Bessarabia in June and July 1940. He then served as chief of staff of the 16th Tank Division from June 1940 and, from March 1941, of the 18th Mechanised Corps at Akkerman in the Odessa Military District.

== World War II ==
=== 1941–1942 ===
Kravchenko entered combat with the 18th Mechanised Corps on the Southern Front in June 1941. From 9 September 1941 to 10 January 1942, he commanded the 31st Tank Brigade of the 20th Army on the Western Front, taking part in the Battle of Moscow. In February 1942, he became deputy commander for tank troops of the 61st Army, and from 31 March to 30 July 1942 he was chief of staff of the 1st Tank Corps. He was promoted to major general of tank troops on 21 July 1942. He then commanded the 2nd Tank Corps until 13 September 1942.

=== Stalingrad and Kursk ===
From 18 September 1942 to 24 January 1944, Kravchenko commanded the 4th Tank Corps, which took part in the encirclement of the German 6th Army at Stalingrad in November 1942. The encircling forces of the Southwestern and Stalingrad Fronts met near Sovetsky at about 4 pm on 23 November 1942. On 7 February 1943, the corps was redesignated the 5th Guards Tank Corps. He was promoted to lieutenant general of tank troops on 7 June 1943.

At the start of the Battle of Kursk in July 1943, the 5th Guards Tank Corps was deployed on the Voronezh Front in the sectors of the 40th Army and the 6th Guards Army. According to the Heroes of the Country database, the corps fought in the battle, including the tank fighting near Prokhorovka, and in October 1943 in the Battle of the Dnieper. By a decree of the Presidium of the Supreme Soviet of 10 January 1944, Kravchenko was made a Hero of the Soviet Union and received the Order of Lenin and the Gold Star medal No. 2546.

=== 6th Tank Army ===
On 20 January 1944, Kravchenko took command of the 6th Tank Army, which fought on the 1st, 2nd and 3rd Ukrainian Fronts. The army took part in the Korsun-Shevchenkovsky, Uman–Botoșani, Jassy–Kishinev and Bucharest–Arad operations. In September 1944, it was redesignated the 6th Guards Tank Army, and Kravchenko was promoted to colonel general of tank troops on 13 September 1944. The army then fought in the Debrecen, Budapest, Vienna and Bratislava–Brno operations.

=== Manchuria ===
After the war in Europe, the 6th Guards Tank Army, whose headquarters was then in the village of Ince in Czechoslovakia, was moved to Mongolia, where it joined the Transbaikal Front under Marshal Rodion Malinovsky. At the start of the Manchurian operation, it had 810 tanks, 193 SU-100 self-propelled guns and 6,489 motor vehicles. Its task was to advance on Changchun and to hold the passes of the Greater Khingan until the main infantry forces arrived. It crossed the border on the night of 9 August 1945 and covered about 400 km in three days, crossing the Greater Khingan and reaching the Central Manchurian Plain.

According to the American historian David Glantz, the army met no opposition other than the terrain, and it relied heavily on aircraft to deliver fuel. Glantz concluded that its advance, together with that of the 39th Army, ended Japanese hopes of defending western Manchuria. As the main striking force of the front, the army advanced more than 800 km in under three weeks. By a decree of 8 September 1945, Kravchenko received a second Gold Star medal, No. 83.

== Postwar service ==
After the war, Kravchenko remained in command of the 6th Guards Tank Army in the Transbaikal Military District, and the army was reorganised as the 6th Guards Mechanised Army in July 1946. From April 1948, he commanded the armoured and mechanised troops of the district. In 1949, he completed the higher academic courses at the Voroshilov Higher Military Academy, now the Military Academy of the General Staff. He then commanded the armoured and mechanised troops of the Baltic and Far Eastern Military Districts. In January 1954, he became assistant commander of the Far Eastern Military District for tank armament. From August 1954, he was placed at the disposal of the Minister of Defence because of serious illness, and in October 1955 he retired on health grounds. He was a deputy of the Supreme Soviet of the Soviet Union of the 2nd convocation from 1946 to 1950.

== Death and commemoration ==
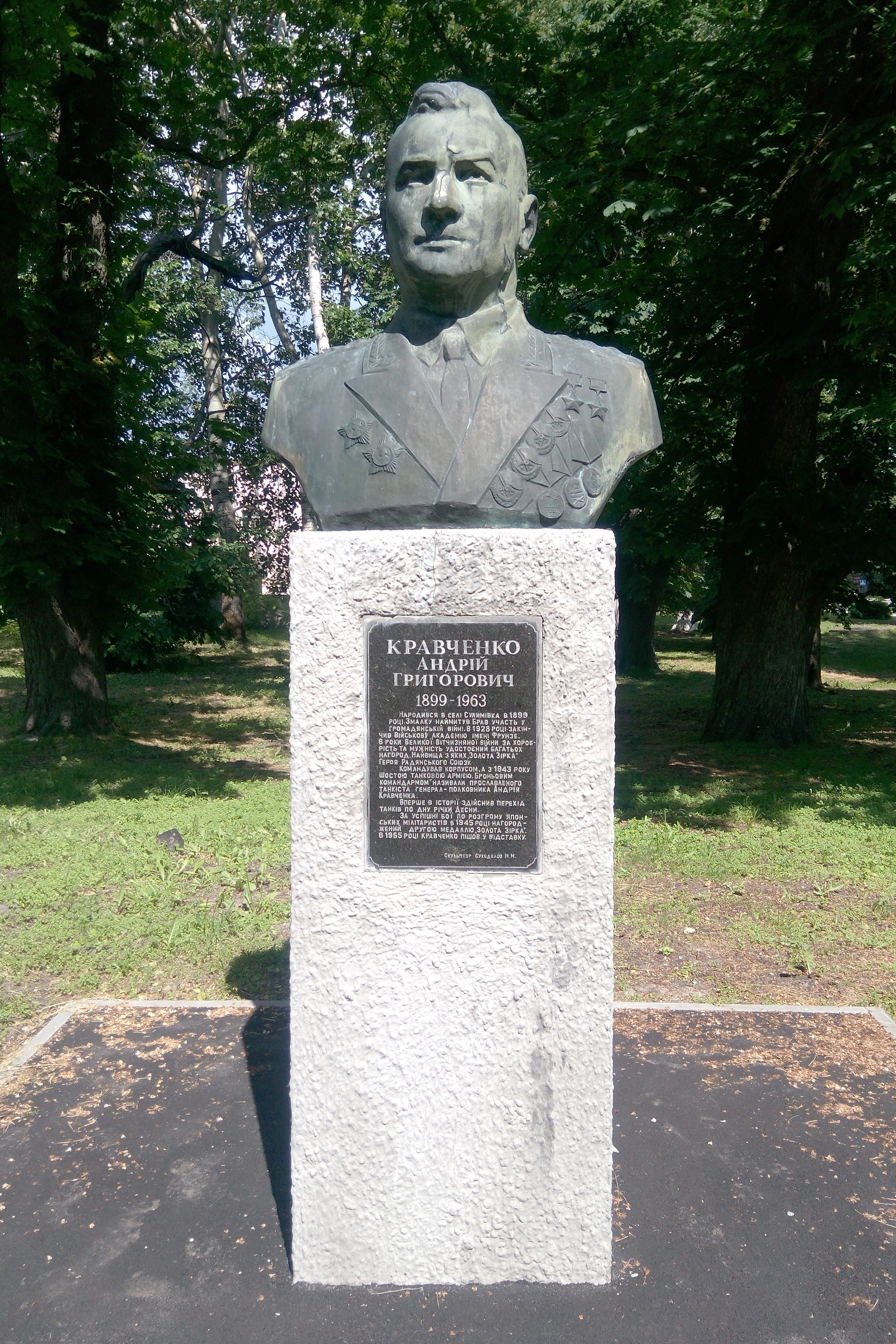
Bust of Kravchenko in Yahotyn

Kravchenko died in Moscow on 18 October 1963 and was buried at the Novodevichy Cemetery. A bust of him stands on the Alley of Heroes in Yahotyn. Memorial plaques were placed in Kyiv, Sumy and Moscow, a memorial sign in Dnipro and an information board in Stavyshche.

Kravchenko's eldest son Vil (1927–1944) served as a ship's boy on a river minesweeping boat of the Dnieper Military Flotilla and was killed at the age of 17 during the Pinsk landing of 1944. He was posthumously awarded the Order of the Patriotic War, 2nd class.

== Honours ==
=== Domestic ===
- Hero of the Soviet Union, twice (10 January 1944, Gold Star No. 2546, and 8 September 1945, Gold Star No. 83)
- Order of Lenin, twice (10 January 1944 and 21 February 1945)
- Order of the Red Banner, four times (21 March 1940, 2 January 1942, 3 November 1944 and 20 June 1949)
- Order of Suvorov, 1st class, twice (13 September 1944 and 28 April 1945)
- Order of Bogdan Khmelnitsky, 1st class (17 May 1944)
- Order of Suvorov, 2nd class (8 February 1943)
- Order of Kutuzov, 2nd class (27 August 1943)
- Medal "For the Defence of Moscow"
- Medal "For the Defence of Stalingrad"
- Medal "For the Capture of Budapest"
- Medal "For the Capture of Vienna"
- Medal "For the Liberation of Prague"
- Medal "For the Victory over Germany in the Great Patriotic War 1941–1945"
- Medal "For the Victory over Japan"
- jubilee medals

=== Foreign ===
- Honorary Knight Commander of the Order of the British Empire (United Kingdom, 11 May 1944)
- Order of St Michael and St George (United Kingdom)
- George Medal (United Kingdom)
- Commander of the Legion of Honour (France)
- Croix de Guerre 1939–1945 (France)
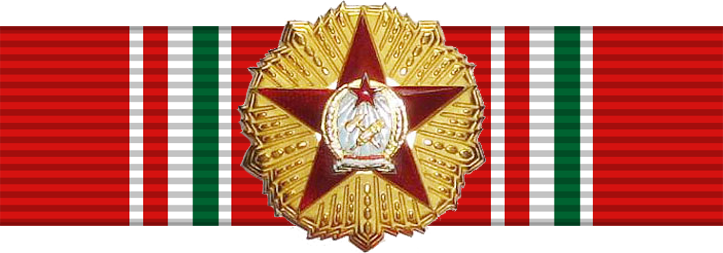
- Order of Merit of the Hungarian People's Republic, 2nd class (Hungary)
- Order of the Red Banner (Mongolia
- Order of the Cloud and Banner (degree unknown) (Republic of China, 24 January 1946)
- Order of the White Lion, 2nd class (Czechoslovakia)
- Order of the Defence of the Fatherland, 3rd class (Romania)
- Medal "For Liberation from the Fascist Yoke" (Romania)
