= Popůvky (Třebíč District) =

- Municipality
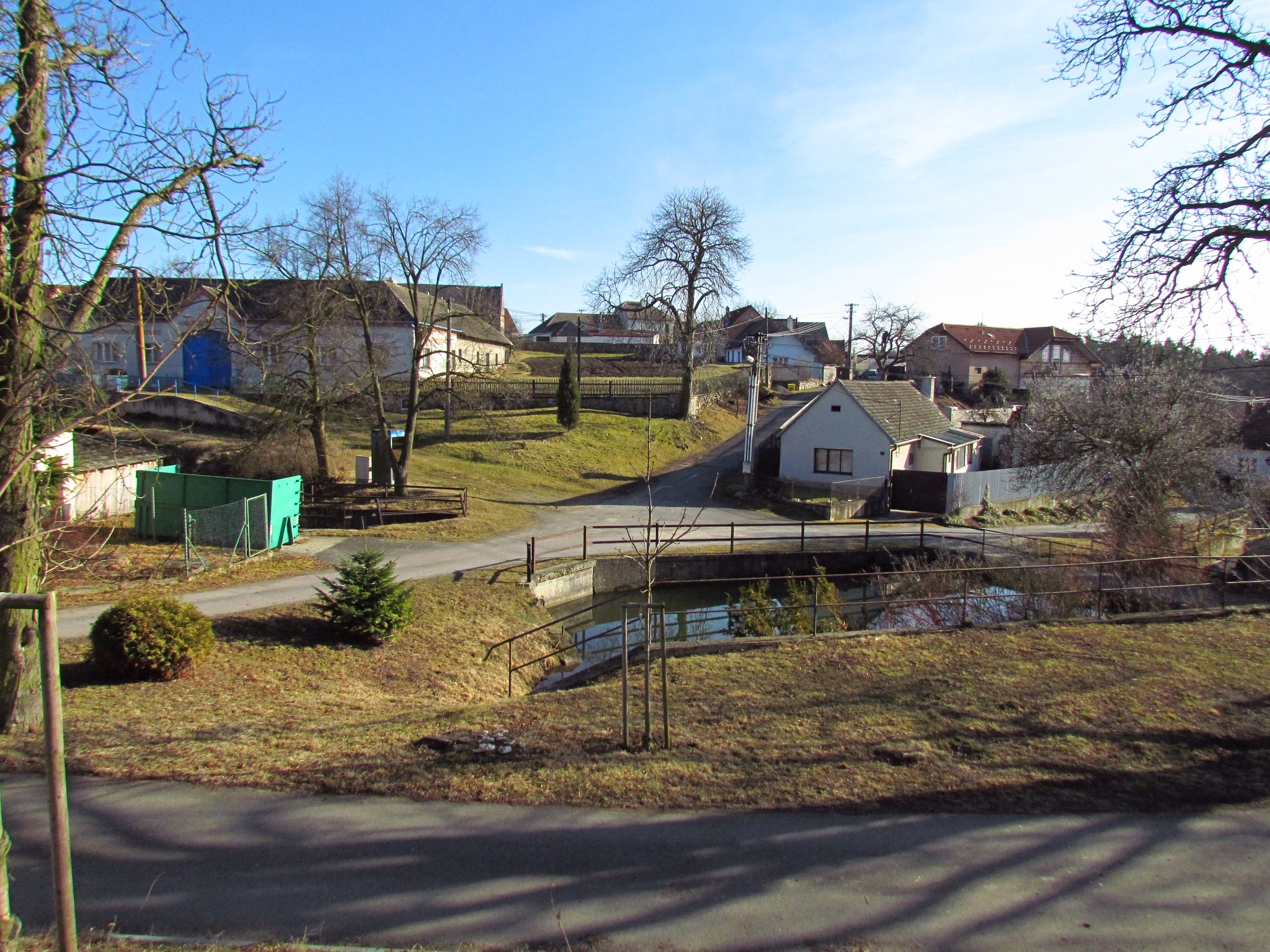
- Centre of Popůvky

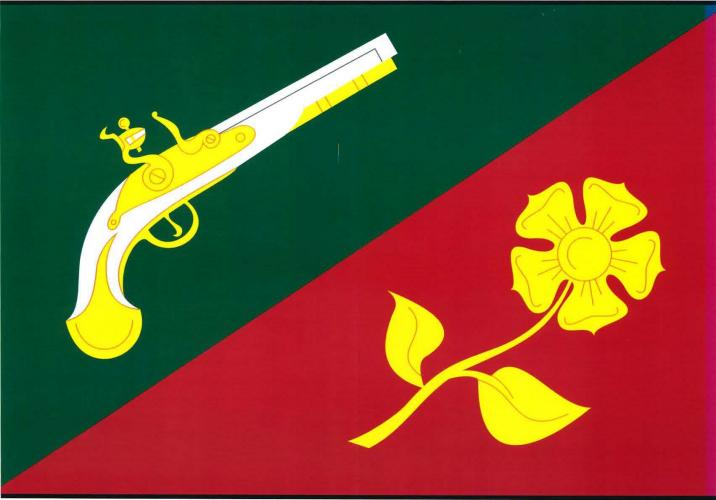
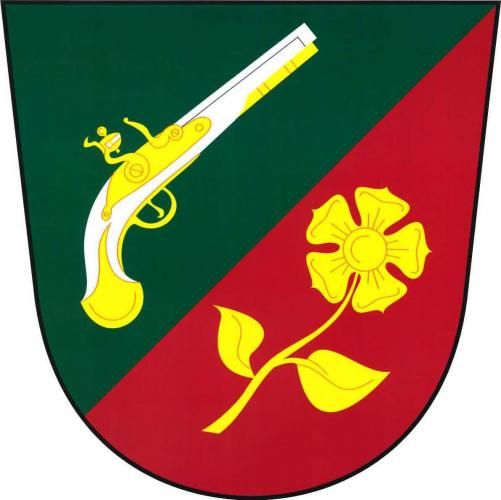
- Flag Coat of arms

- Location in the Czech Republic
- Coordinates: 49°9′33″N 16°7′39″E
- Country: Czech Republic
- Region: Vysočina
- District: Třebíč
- First mentioned: 1371

Area
  - Total: 5.74 km^{2} (2.22 sq mi)
- Elevation: 445 m (1,460 ft)

Population (2026-01-01)
  - Total: 73
  - Density: 13/km^{2} (33/sq mi)
- Time zone: UTC+1 (CET)
  - Summer (DST): UTC+2 (CEST)
- Postal code: 675 75
- Website: www.popuvky-obec.cz

Popůvky is a municipality and village in Třebíč District in the Vysočina Region of the Czech Republic. It has about 70 inhabitants.

Popůvky lies approximately 20 kilometres (12 mi) east of Třebíč, 48 km (30 mi) south-east of Jihlava, and 161 km (100 mi) south-east of Prague.

== Demographics ==
Historical population
Year	Pop.	±%
1869	185	—
1880	212	+14.6%
1890	198	−6.6%
1900	196	−1.0%
1910	221	+12.8%
1921	204	−7.7%
1930	199	−2.5%
1950	186	−6.5%
1961	178	−4.3%
1970	173	−2.8%
1980	154	−11.0%
1991	126	−18.2%
2001	91	−27.8%
2011	82	−9.9%
2021	67	−18.3%
Source: Censuses
