= Mirnaya, Zabaykalsky Krai =

Mirnaya Мирная
- Settlement
- Location within Zabaykalsky Krai Location within Russia
- Coordinates: 50°45′N 116°03′E
- Country: Russia
- Region: Zabaykalsky Krai
- District: Olovyanninsky District
- Time zone: UTC+9:00

Mirnaya (Russian: Мирная) is a rural locality (a settlement) in Olovyanninsky District, Zabaykalsky Krai, Russia. Population: 1,032 (2021 census); 1,367 (2010 census); 1,740 (2002 census); There are 22 streets in this settlement.

== Geography ==
This rural locality is located 40 km from Olovyannaya (the district's administrative centre), 229 km from Chita (capital of Zabaykalsky Krai) and 5,546 km from Moscow. Byrka is the nearest rural locality.
