= Popůvky (Brno-Country District) =

- Municipality
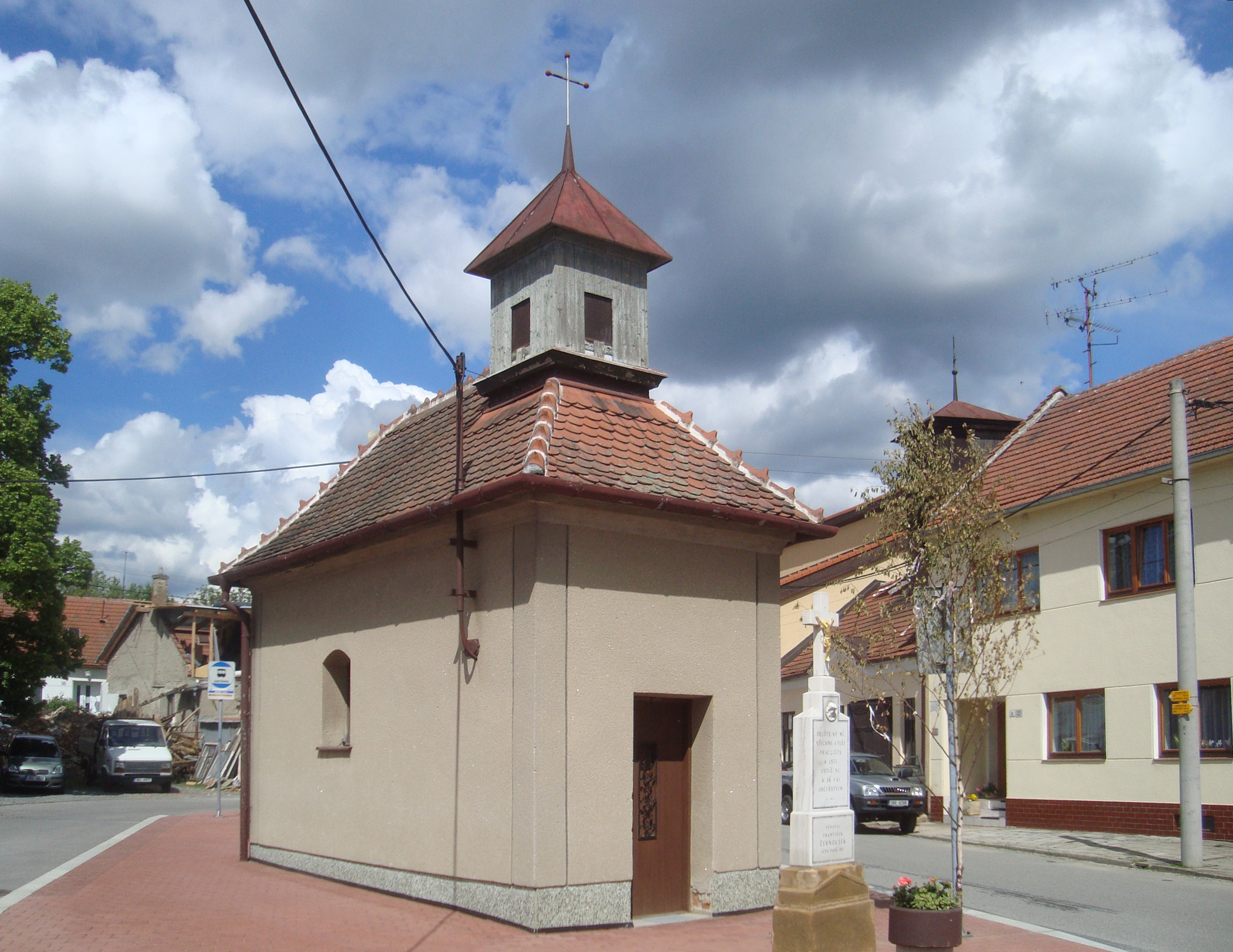
- Chapel of Saint John of Nepomuk

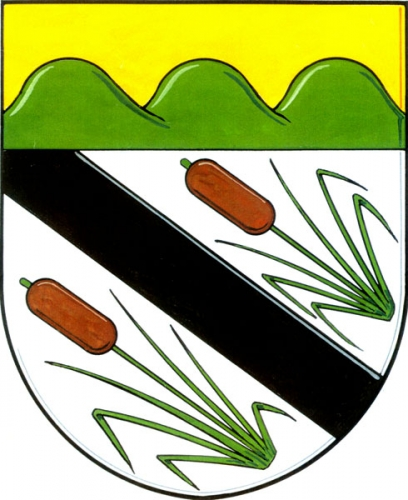
- Flag Coat of arms

- Location in the Czech Republic
- Coordinates: 49°10′39″N 16°29′15″E
- Country: Czech Republic
- Region: South Moravian
- District: Brno-Country
- First mentioned: 1349

Area
  - Total: 7.46 km^{2} (2.88 sq mi)
- Elevation: 288 m (945 ft)

Population (2026-01-01)
  - Total: 1,908
  - Density: 256/km^{2} (662/sq mi)
- Time zone: UTC+1 (CET)
  - Summer (DST): UTC+2 (CEST)
- Postal code: 664 41
- Website: www.popuvky.cz

Popůvky is a municipality and village in Brno-Country District in the South Moravian Region of the Czech Republic. It has about 1,900 inhabitants.

== Demographics ==
Historical population
Year	Pop.	±%
1869	237	—
1880	258	+8.9%
1890	282	+9.3%
1900	320	+13.5%
1910	364	+13.7%
1921	394	+8.2%
1930	537	+36.3%
1950	589	+9.7%
1961	615	+4.4%
1970	623	+1.3%
1980	584	−6.3%
1991	536	−8.2%
2001	599	+11.8%
2011	1,371	+128.9%
2021	1,798	+31.1%
Source: Censuses

== Transport ==
The D1 motorway from Prague to Brno runs through the municipality.
