= 2nd Ukrainian Front =

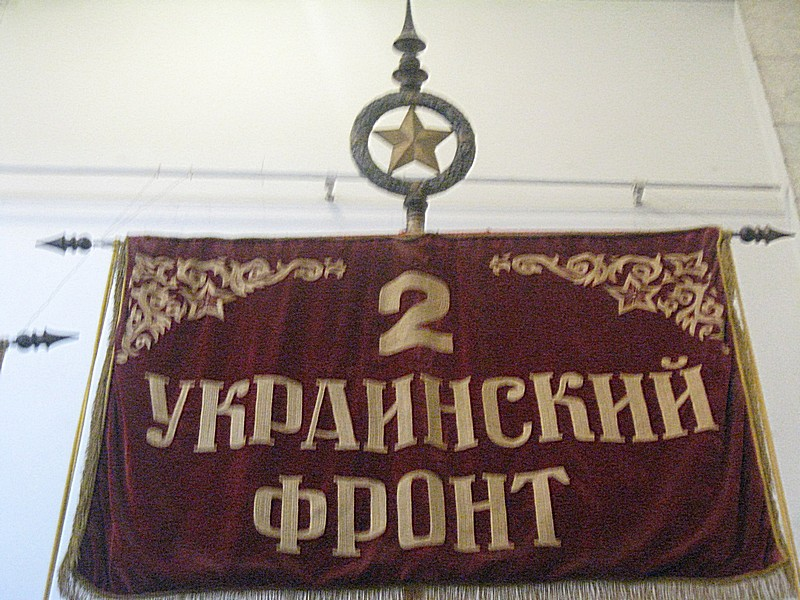
- Standard of the 2nd Ukrainian Front
- Active: 1943–1945
- Country: Soviet Union
- Branch: Red Army
- Type: Army group
- Role: Co-ordination and conduct of Red Army Operations in Ukraine, South-Eastern and Central Europe
- Engagements: World War II; Battle of the Dnieper; Battle of Korsun–Cherkassy; Second Jassy–Kishinev Offensive; Siege of Budapest; Western Carpathian Offensive; Vienna Offensive; Prague Offensive

The 2nd Ukrainian Front (Russian: 2-й Украинский фронт) was a front of the Red Army during the Second World War.

== History ==
On October 20, 1943, the Steppe Front was renamed the 2nd Ukrainian Front.

In mid-May 1944 Malinovsky took over the 2nd Ukrainian Front.

During the Second Jassy–Kishinev Offensive, 2nd Ukrainian Front, led by Army General Rodion Malinovsky, comprised:

- 6th Guards Tank Army – Major General A.G. Kravchenko
- 4th Guards Army – Ivan Galanin
- 7th Guards Army – Lieutenant General M.S. Shumilov
- 27th Army – Lieutenant General S.G. Trofimenko
- 40th Army – Lieutenant General Filipp Zhmachenko
- 52nd Army – Lieutenant General K.A. Koroteev
- 53rd Army – Lieutenant General Ivan Managarov
- 18th Tank Corps – Major General V.I. Polozkov
- Cavalry-Mechanized Group Gorshkov – Major General Sergey Gorshkov
  - 5th Guards Cavalry Corps
  - 23rd Tank Corps – Lieutenant General Alexey Akhmanov

On 1 January 1945, during the Siege of Budapest, the Front consisted of the

- 7th Guards Army,
- 27th Army
- 40th Army
- 53rd Army
- 6th Guards Tank Army,
- a Cavalry mechanized group consisting of 4th and 6th Guards Cavalry Corps,
- 5th Air Army.

On 10 June 1945, in accordance with a Stavka directive of 29 May 1945, the 2nd Ukrainian Front was disbanded. Elements thereof were incorporated into Headquarters Odessa Military District.

The 12th Air Defence Corps (12 корпус ПВО), established from the Odessa Corps Air Defence Area (Одесский корпусной район ПВО) on 21.04.1944, provided air defence to the 2nd Ukrainian Front until 01.02.1945, except for its 61st AAA Division (1776, 1778, 1780, 1782 and 1784 AAA regiments and the 6th AA Lighting Regiment), which provided air defence to the 1st Ukrainian Front.

== Commanders ==
- Army General Ivan Konev (July 1943 – May 1944; since February 1944 Marshal of the Soviet Union)
- Army General Rodion Malinovsky (May 1944 – May 1945; since September 1944 Marshal of the Soviet Union)

== See also ==
- Combat composition of the Soviet Army

== References and further reading ==
- Erickson, John (1989) [1983]. The Road to Berlin, Stalin's War with Germany, Volume 2. Yale University Press. ISBN 0-300-07813-7.
