= 6th Guards Tank Army =

Formation of the Soviet army, 1944-1993

6th Tank Army 6th Guards Tank Army
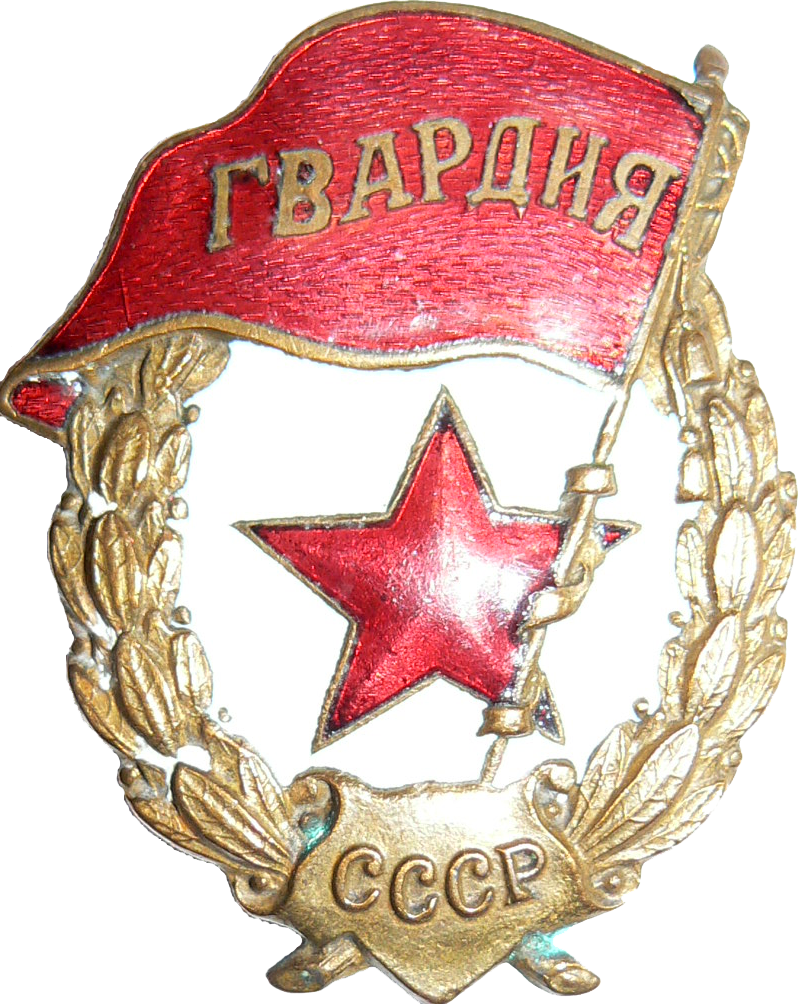
- Active: 1944–1993
- Country: Soviet Union
- Branch: Armour
- Type: Offensive
- Size: two or three corps (Second World War) three divisions (Cold War)
- Part of: Kiev Military District (Cold War)
- Engagements: World War II; Battle of Debrecen; Second Jassy–Kishinev offensive

The 6th Guards Order of Red Banner Tank Army was a tank army of the Soviet Union's Red Army, first formed in January 1944 as the 6th Tank Army, and disbanded in Ukraine in the 1990s after the dissolution of the Soviet Union. During its service in World War II, the army was commanded by Lieutenant General of Tank Troops (later Colonel General) Andrei Kravchenko.

== World War II ==
Initially commanding the 5th Mechanised Corps and the 5th Guards Tank Corps, the 6th Tank Army's first major operation was the suppression of the Korsun-Cherkassy Pocket in January–February 1944. It then fought in the Iassy-Kishinev Offensive during August 1944 before gaining a Guards title in September 1944. Under its new title, it was soon engaged in the Battle of Debrecen on the 2nd Ukrainian Front, before fighting against the Germans during Operation Frühlingserwachen in March 1945. Pushing west, the tank army moved south of Vienna, Austria and pivoted to the north in a wide encircling maneuver that cut Vienna off from the rest of the German Reich. At the end of the war, one of its subordinate formations, the 2nd Guards Mechanised Corps, ended operations in the area of Benešov, Czechoslovakia, on 9 May 1945.

The 6th Guards Tank Army was then moved to the Transbaikal Military District in order to take part in the Soviet invasion of Manchuria. The army, under the command of Colonel General Andrei Kravchenko spearheaded the Transbaikal Front's offensive against the Japanese Kwantung Army on 9 August 1945. The 6th Guards Tank Army consisted of the 5th Guards Tank Corps, and 7th and 9th Guards Mechanised Corps, and many smaller formations, in all, a total of 1,019 tanks and self-propelled guns. For this operation, the tank army was restructured such that the infantry, artillery, and armored components were much more balanced than they had been during the war against the Germans. This was the first example of what proved to be the standard Soviet mechanized army organization during the Cold War. During the Soviet invasion of Manchuria, the Army was operating as part of the Transbaikal Front, and during the Khingano-Mukden Operation, the Army was tasked to advance 800 kilometers.

== Cold War ==
Order of Battle of the 6th Guards Tank Army in 1987

It was stationed in Mongolia, reporting to the Transbaikal Military District, for 15 years after the war. It still included the 5th Guards Tank Division (First Formation, "Stalingrad-Kiev").

The friendship with China of those days and the Nikita Khrushchev military reductions changed the fate of the Army, and in 1959 it was relocated to Dnipropetrovsk (now Dnipro) in the Kyiv Military District. 22nd Guards Tank Division joined the army in 1957. Toward the end of the 1980s it appears to have retained four Guards Tank Divisions – the 17th, 42nd (the former 42nd Guards Rifle Division) and the 75th (formerly the 75th Guards Rifle Division, plus the 22nd Guards Tank Division (disbanded September 1990).

On 11 November 1990, following the disbandment of the 22nd and the 75th Guards Tank Divisions, the reorganisation of the 42nd Guards Tank Division as the 6299th Base for Storage of Weapons and Equipment, and the arrival of the 93rd Guards Motor Rifle Division from the Southern Group of Forces, the Army had on hand 462 main battle tanks, all T-64s, 228 BMPs and BTRs, 218 other pieces of equipment of various types, including the surface-to-surface missiles of the 107th Rocket Brigade at Kremenchug, and five helicopters (with the 16th Separate Mixed Aviation Squadron at Podgorodnoe).

| Formation in 1985 | Formation in 1987 | Formation in 1989 | Formation in 1991-2 (Ukraine) |
|---|---|---|---|
17th Guards Tank Division
| 22nd Guards Tank Division | | | Disbanded in 1990 |
| 42nd Guards Tank Division | | | Renamed 6299th Base for Storage of Weapons and Equipment in 1990 / Disbanded in 1991 |
| 75th Guards Tank Division | | Renamed 5362nd Weapons and Equipment Storage Base | Disbanded in 1990 |
| 52nd Tank Division (Mob.) | Renamed 722nd Territorial Training Center | Renamed 5359th Weapons and Equipment Storage Base | Disbanded in 1991 |
| 58th Reserve Tank Division (Mob.) | Renamed 747th Territorial Training Center | Renamed 5361st Weapons and Equipment Storage Base | Disbanded in 1990 |
| 64th Reserve Tank Division (Mob.) | | Renamed 5360th Weapons and Equipment Storage Base | Disbanded in 1991 |

== Ukrainian service ==
After the dissolution of the Soviet Union, it became part of the Ukrainian Ground Forces. In March 1992 Major General Volodymyr Shkidchenko returned home to become the army's commander. He was promoted to lieutenant general by Edict 642/92 of 31 December 1992. Shkidchenko was released from command of the 6th Guards Tank Army by Presidential Edict No. 220/93 June 19, 1993, to be appointed to another post. The first reference to the 6th Army Corps, the successor formation, appears in Ukaz N 350/93 of the President of Ukraine on 21 August 1993. Thus it appears the 6th Guards Tank Army was disbanded by redesignation sometime between June and August 1993.

Personnel of the Ukrainian 6th Army Corps mark the 65th anniversary of the creation of its predecessor, the 6th Guards Tank Army.

The 6th Army Corps was based at Dnipropetrovsk and consisted of several brigades, including the 17th Armored Brigade and the 93rd Mechanized Brigade. It was disbanded in 2013 and being replaced by Operational Command South.

== Commanders ==
The army was commanded by the following officers during its existence.

- Colonel General Andrei Kravchenko (20 January 1944 – June 1947)
- Lieutenant General Vladimir Zhdanov (June 1947 – 30 April 1949)
- Lieutenant General Ivan Dremov (30 April 1949 – 27 February 1958)
- Lieutenant General Evgeniy Fominykh (27 February 1958 – May 1960)
- Lieutenant General Gennady Obaturov (May 1960 – 13 July 1966)
- Lieutenant General Vladimir Makarov (13 July 1966 – 13 June 1969)
- Lieutenant General Gennady Zakharov (13 June 1969 – 26 February 1971)
- Lieutenant General Pyotr Shkidchenko (26 February 1971 –17 August 1973)
- Lieutenant General Yuriy Terentev (17 August 1973 – May 1978)
- Lieutenant General Vladimir Osipov (May 1978 – 6 January 1981)
- Lieutenant General Valery Sokolov (6 January 1981 – December 1983)
- Lieutenant General Sergey Karsakov (December 1983 – September 1985)
- Lieutenant General Vladlen Tsvetkov (September 1985 – May 1988)
- Lieutenant General Valentyn Boryskin (May 1988 – July 1989)
- Colonel General Vasyl Sobkov (July 1989 – 2 May 1991)
- Lieutenant General Vitaly Radetsky (3 May 1991 – April 1992)
