= Liberation Day (Moldova) =

Day of the Liberation of Moldova
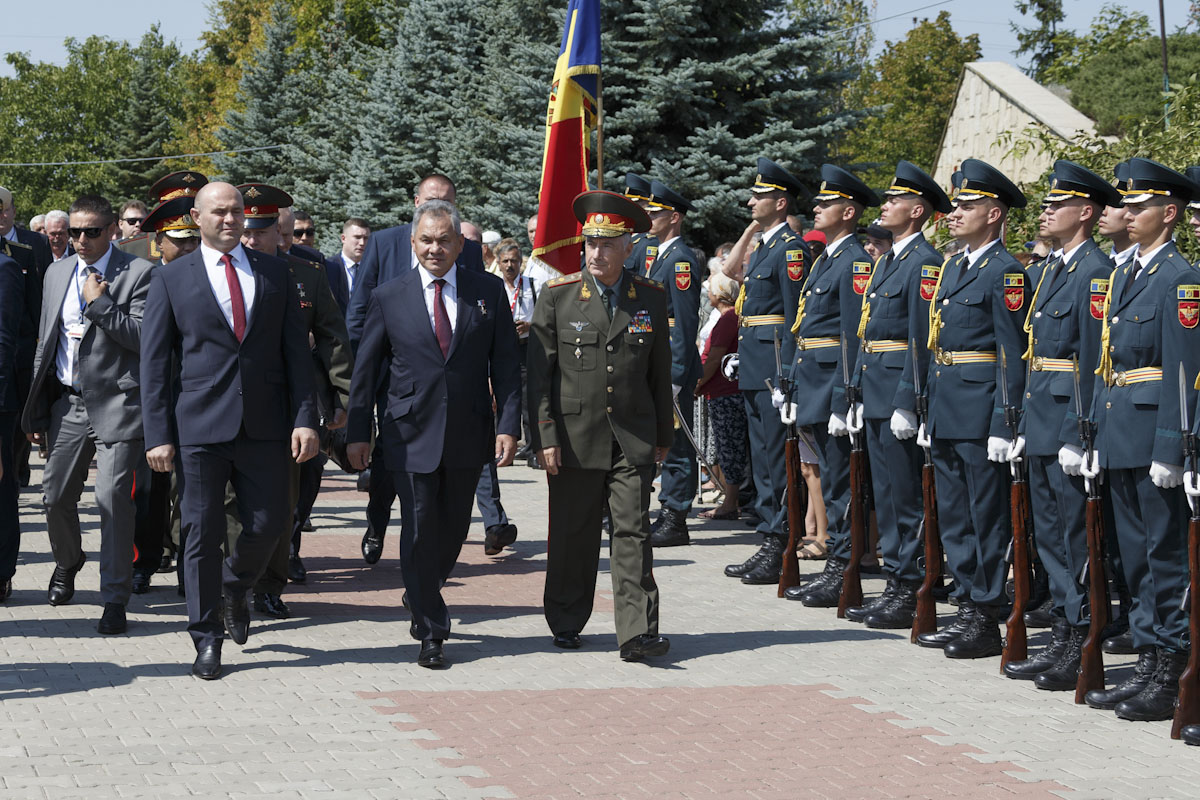
- Sergey Shoigu, Pavel Voicu, and Victor Gaiciuc during the 24 August celebrations in 2019.
- Official name: Day of the Liberation of Moldova from Fascist Occupation
- Observed by: Moldova
- Type: National
- Significance: Defeat of the Axis and reestablishment of the Moldovan SSR
- Date: 24 August
- Next time: 24 August 2027
- Related to: World War II

The Day of the Liberation of Moldova from Fascist Occupation (Romanian: Ziua eliberării Moldovei de sub ocupația fascistă) is a public holiday celebrated annually in Moldova to commemorates the anniversary of the allied victory in the second Jassy–Kishinev offensive during World War II. It is celebrated on 24 August and is also associated with the former Liberation from Fascist Occupation Day (which was a public holiday there from 1949 to 1990) and the present day European Day of Remembrance for Victims of Stalinism and Nazism in Romania. It is used to commemorate Moldova's role in the defeat of Nazi Germany in 1945. It is also recognized by the internationally unrecognized Transnistria.

== Background ==
The operation was named after the two major cities between Romania and Moldova: Iași and Chișinău. The Soviet Red Army offensive against forces from the Axis powers took place in what was then the Eastern half of the Kingdom of Romania, and saw the participation of the 2nd and 3rd Ukrainian Fronts. The two fronts engaged the Army Group South Ukraine, which consisted of a mix German and Romanian formations. The operation's goal was to reclaim the Moldavian SSR and destroy the presence of the Romanian Armed Forces and the Wehrmacht in the region.

== Holiday history ==
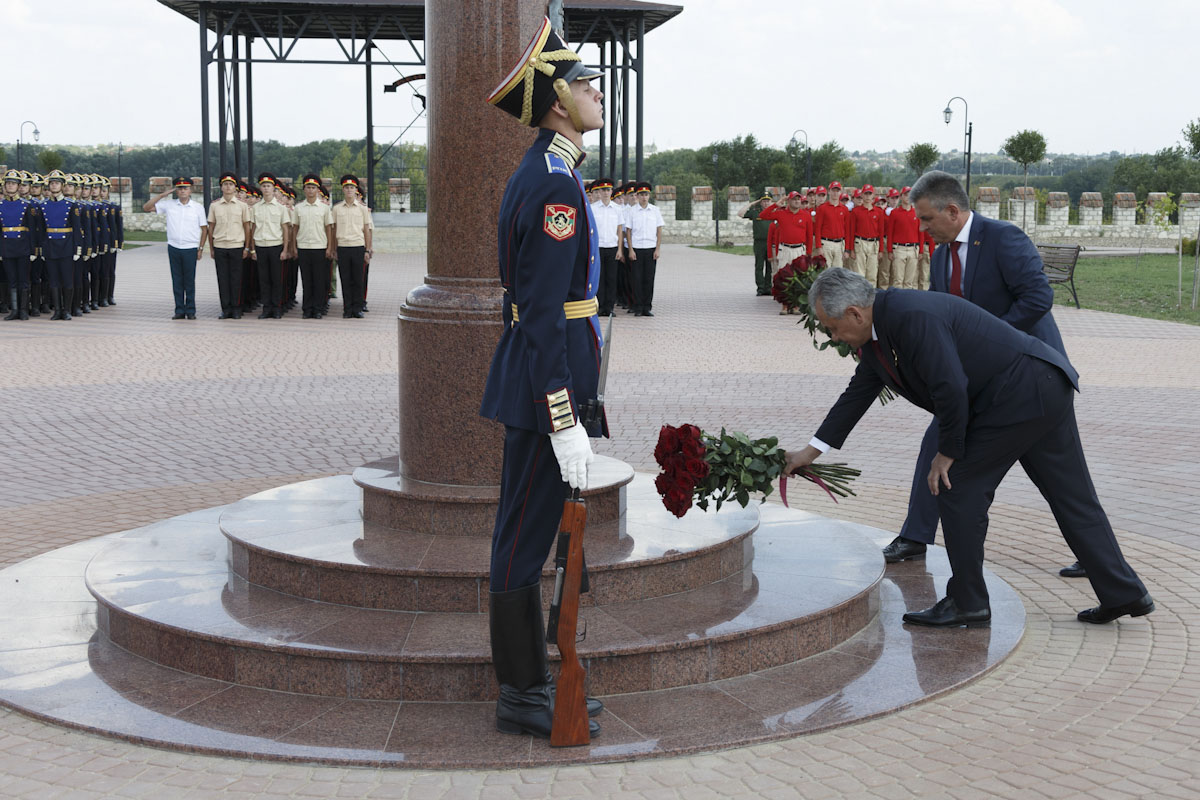
Sergey Shoigu with Transnistrian president Vadim Krasnoselsky laying flowers on 23 August, 2019.

=== Soviet era ===
In the post war period, Liberation Day was a public holiday celebrated in the Moldovan SSR. On 23 August 1969, during the 25th anniversary of the offensive, a Liberation Monument at the Academy of Sciences of Moldova was opened, having been renovated three times, in 1975, 2014 and 2019. In the neighboring Socialist Republic of Romania, Liberation Day was the main holiday of the state, growing in importance in the 70s.

=== Independence ===
Since Independence, the holidays was for the most part neglected by pro-European Union governments and presidents. Major celebrations of the holiday took place under Presidents Vladimir Voronin and Igor Dodon, both of whom are considered to be Russophiles. In 2006, the newly renovated Eternity Memorial Complex in Chișinău was opened on Liberation Day by Voronin.

==== 75th anniversary ====
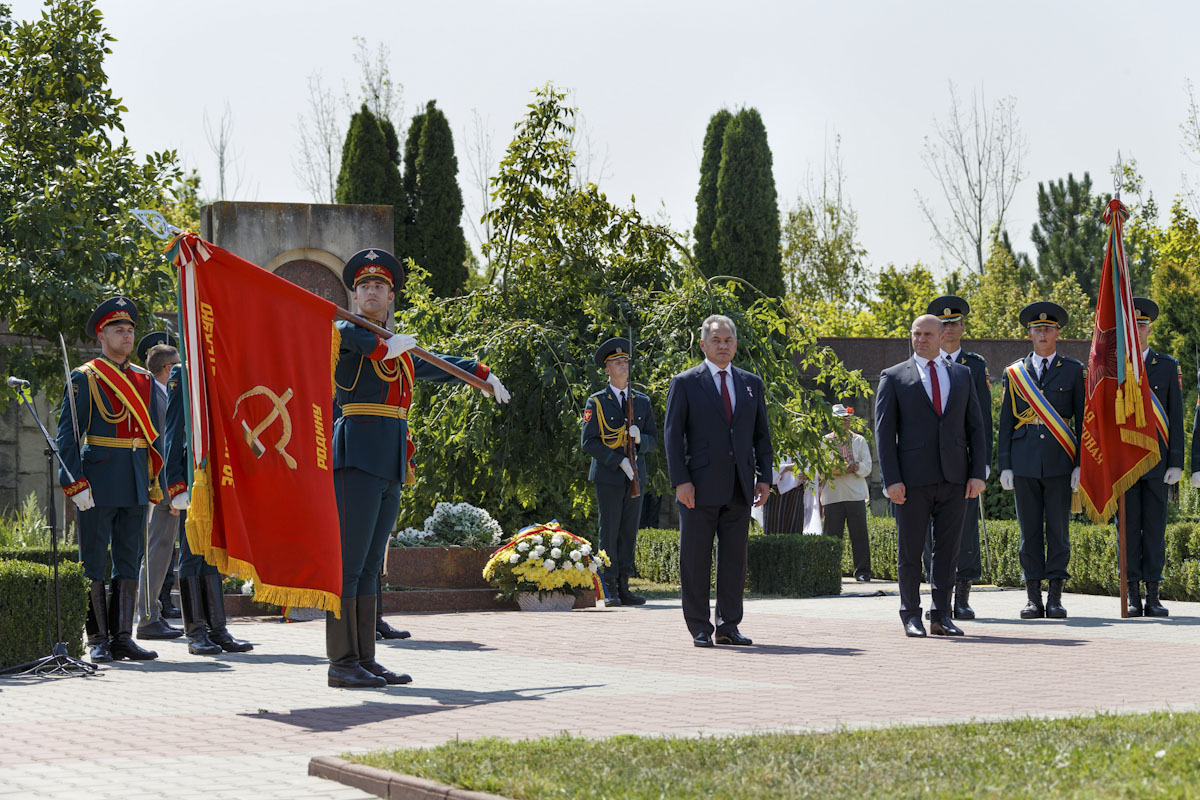
The flag ceremony

In early 2019, Dodon declared the year to be dedicated to the operation's diamond jubilee (75th anniversary). As a result, he ordered the creation of a National Coordination Committee to plan national events and celebrations, including a potential state visit by Russian president Vladimir Putin and the release of a movie entitled "Jassy-Kishinev Operation. Moldova's History". The actual day of the anniversary was attended by Russian Defence Minister Sergey Shoigu at the request of Moldovan Defence Minister Pavel Voicu. During the national ceremony at the Capul de pod Șerpeni Memorial Complex, Shoigu ceremonially handed to Voicu the military flags of two all-Moldovan regiments who participated in the offensive (the banners of the 14th Assault Engineering and Combat Brigade as well as the 507th Army Anti-Tank Kishinev Artillery Regiment), which until that point, were kept at the Central Armed Forces Museum. The visit was criticized by Prime Minister Maia Sandu, who allowed the visit on the condition that no agreements are signed. Shoigu also attended a separate ceremony in Transnistria hosted by the occupying Operational Group of Russian Forces.

==== 2020 celebrations ====
On 15 April 2020, Dodon ordered the postponement of the diamond jubilee Victory Day celebrations on 9 May, which included the Immortal Regiment march, to Liberation Day due to the coronavirus pandemic in Moldova. A military parade on Great National Assembly Square was also planned for 24 August, which was later scrapped in July of that year.

On 24 August, the Immortal Regiment saw 200 cars from the 1940s, including the GAZ-M20 Pobeda, drive along the streets of the capital.

== See also ==
- Liberation Day (Ukraine)
- Independence Day (Belarus)
