= Măcărești =

Măcăreşti may refer to the following places:

- Măcăreşti, a village in Ponor Commune, Alba County, Romania
- Măcăreşti, a village in Prisăcani Commune, Iaşi County, Romania
- Măcăreşti, Ungheni, a commune in Ungheni district, Moldova
