= Center of Military History and Culture =

The Center for Culture and Military History (Romanian: Centrul de Istorie și Cultură Militară) is an institution of the Moldovan National Army under the auspices of the Ministry of Defense. Founded on 18 August 2011, its mission is to develop fundamental investigation into Moldovan military history. It has cooperated with foreign historical institutions such as the Romanian National Military Archives and the NATO Information and Documentation Centre. In February 2017, the book Homage and Gratitude, which was in memory of those who fell in the Transnistria War, was unveiled at the center. It has also played host to multiple events, including the first meeting of the National Council for War Veterans Affairs in 2020 and the meeting of Moldovan alumni of the George C. Marshall European Center for Security Studies in 2015. It is currently under the leadership of its director, Colonel Alexandru Chirilenco, who was appointed by President Igor Dodon in December 2019. One of its former directors, Colonel Vitalie Ciobanu, was the founded of the magazine "Cohorta" (founded in 1999), the first and only military publication of Moldovan military history.

== Structure ==
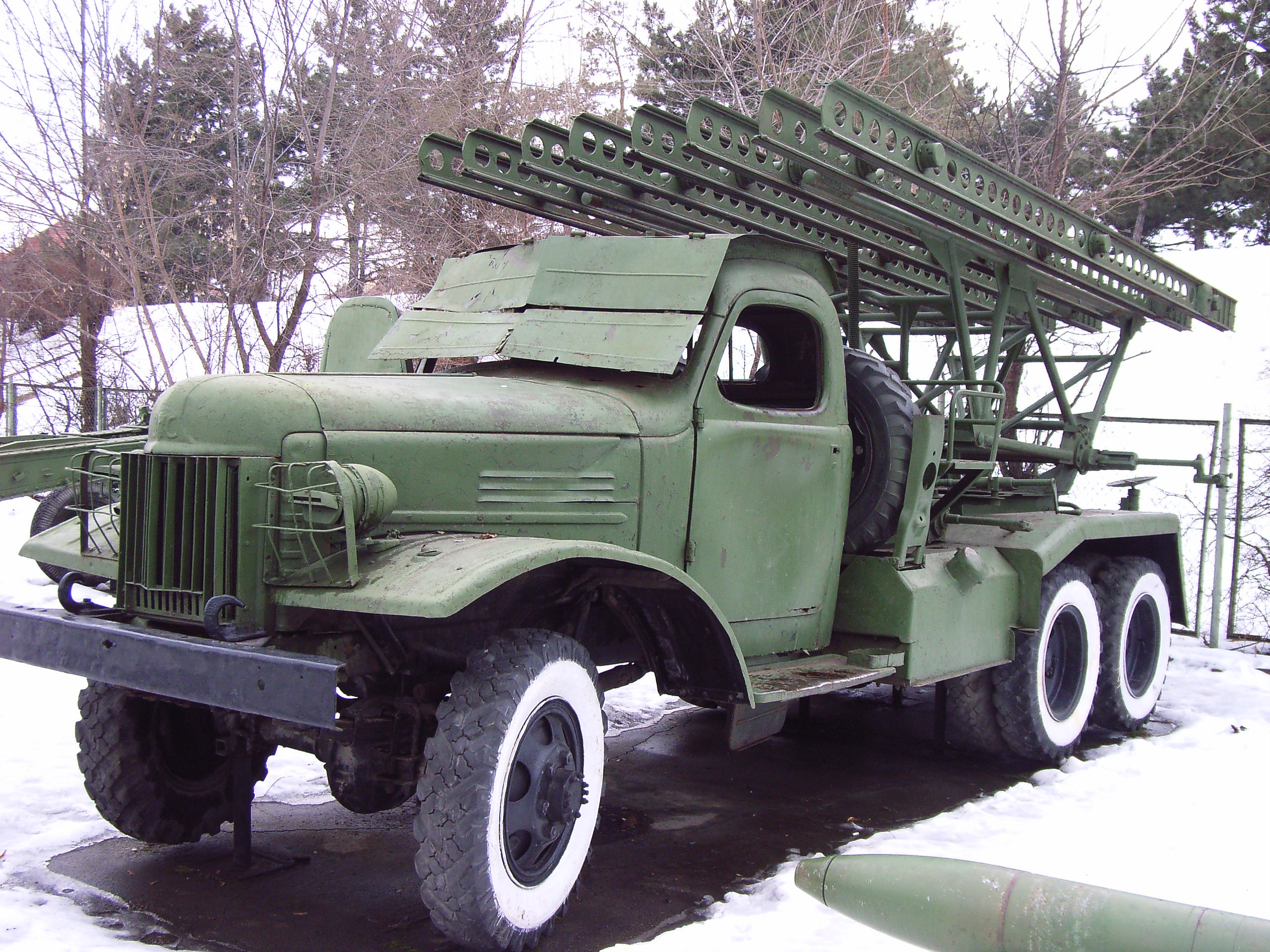
A Katyusha rocket launcher on a ZIS-151 chassis at the center.

It has control over the Army Museum of Chisinau. Another branch of the institution is the Military Historiography and Museography, whose area of investigation began in 1994 through the establishment of the military museum. In 2015, at the initiative of Defense Minister Anatol Șalaru, a museum was opened at the Center for Culture and Military History where evidence of deportations during the Soviet occupation of Bessarabia and Northern Bukovina are displayed. In September of that, on his instructions and with his personal participation, the T-34 tank mounted on the territory of the Ștefan cel Mare 2nd Motorized Infantry Brigade in Chisinau was removed from the pedestal and was transferred to the museum. The institution also owns an open air exhibition of military technical equipment and weapons, as well as the Capul de pod Șerpeni Memorial Complex through the army museum.

== See also ==
- Bundeswehr Military History Museum
- United States Army Center of Military History
- Central House of Officers of the Russian Army
