= Second Jassy–Kishinev offensive =

Second Soviet 1944 offensive into Romania

Jassy–Kishinev offensive
- Part of the Eastern Front of World War II
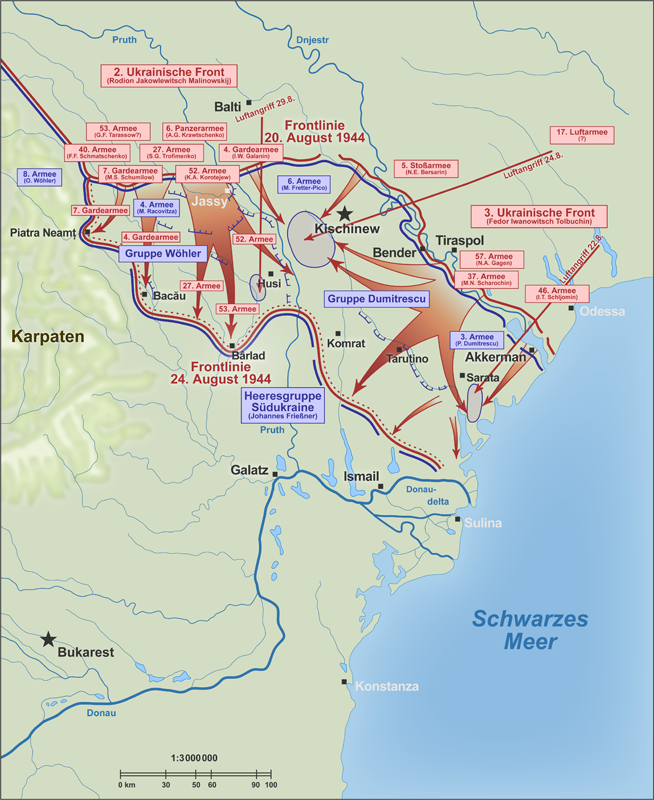
- Soviet advance
Date	20–29 August 1944
Location	Eastern and southern Romania
Result	Soviet victory; Destruction of the German 6th Army; Romania undergoes a coup and defects to the Allies; German forces begin evacuating the Balkans
Territorial changes	Soviet Union reoccupies central and southern Bessarabia

Belligerents
Soviet Union; Romania (24–29 August); Yugoslavia United States (Air support only)	Romania (20–24 August); Germany

Commanders and leaders
(Soviet Union) Joseph Stalin (Soviet Union) Semyon Timoshenko (Soviet Union) Rodion Malinovsky (Soviet Union) Fyodor Tolbukhin (Soviet Union) Filipp Oktyabrsky (Kingdom of Romania) Michael I (Kingdom of Romania) Constantin Sănătescu (Kingdom of Romania) Gheorghe Mihail (Kingdom of Romania) Nicolae Macici	(Kingdom of Romania) Ion Antonescu (Kingdom of Romania) Ilie Șteflea (Kingdom of Romania) Petre Dumitrescu (Kingdom of Romania) Ioan Mihail Racoviță (Nazi Germany) Adolf Hitler (Nazi Germany) Johannes Friessner (Nazi Germany) Otto Wöhler (Nazi Germany) Maximilian Fretter-Pico (Nazi Germany) Alfred Gerstenberg

Units involved
see below	see below

Strength
Soviet Union: 1,314,200; 16,000 guns 1,870 tanks 2,200 aircraft Romania: 465,659	Romania: 1,163,347 (as of 15 August 1944); 800 aircraft Germany: 250,000 (Army Group South Ukraine)

Casualties and losses
Soviet Union: 13,197 irrecoverable losses 53,933 wounded or sick Romania: 8,586 killed or wounded	Romania: 25 aircraft Germany: 150,000 killed, wounded or captured

The Jassy–Kishinev offensive, (Note: Romanian: Operațiunea Iași-Chișinău Russian: Ясско-кишинёвская стратегическая наступательная операция – Jassy–Kishinev strategic offensive operation. A number of less common transliteration variants of the operation's name exists in various historical sources. Among them are Yassy–Kishinev Operation (Chris Bellamy, 1986), Iassi–Kishinev Operation (David Glantz, 1997), Second Iasi–Kishinev Operation (David Glantz, 2007) etc.) named after the two major cities, Jassy and Kishinev, in the staging area, was a Soviet offensive against Axis forces, which took place in Eastern Romania from 20 to 29 August 1944 during World War II. The 2nd and 3rd Ukrainian Fronts of the Red Army engaged Army Group South Ukraine, which consisted of combined German and Romanian formations, in an operation to reoccupy Bessarabia and destroy the Axis forces in the region, opening the way into Romania and the Balkans.

The offensive resulted in the encirclement and destruction of the German forces, allowing the Soviet Army to resume its strategic advance further into Eastern Europe. It also pressured Romania to switch allegiance from the Axis powers to the Allies. For the Germans, this was a massive defeat, which can be compared to the defeat at Stalingrad.

== Background ==
The Red Army had advanced past Romania's pre-war borders in the Uman–Botoșani offensive in early April. By late April, the German-Romanian allies managed to stabilize the frontline on the Carpathians-Târgu Frumos-lower Dniester alignment, and on May 6 the Stavka ordered the Soviet troops to switch to a defensive posture. Historian David Glantz however claims the Soviets made an unsuccessful attack in the same sector in an operation he refers to as the first Jassy–Kishinev offensive, from 8 April to 6 June 1944. In 1944, the Red Army pressed the Wehrmacht back along its entire front-line in the East. By May 1944, Germany's South Ukraine Army Group (Heeresgruppe Südukraine) was pushed back towards the prewar Romanian frontier, with the German 6th Army managing to establish a line on the lower Dniester River after the conclusion of the Soviet Odessa Offensive in April 1944. The line, however, was breached in two places, with the Red Army holding bridgeheads. After June, calm returned to the sector, allowing the rebuilding of the German formations.

Heeresgruppe Südukraine had been, until June 1944, one of the most powerful German formations in terms of armour. However, during the summer of 1944 the Oberkommando des Heeres re-assigned most of its armoured units to Army Group North and to Army Group Centre to stem Red Army advances in the Baltic states, Belarus, northern Ukraine, and Poland. On the eve of the offensive, the only armoured formations left were the 1st Romanian Armored Division (with the Tiger I tank), and the German 13th Panzer and 10th Panzergrenadier Divisions.

=== Failure of German intelligence ===
Soviet deception operations prior to the attack worked well. The German command-staff believed that the movement of Soviet forces along the front line was a result of a troop transfer to the north. The Wehrmacht lacked knowledge of the exact positions of Soviet formations until the final hours before the Jassy–Kishinev operation started.

By contrast, the Romanians were aware of the imminent Soviet offensive and anticipated a rerun of Stalingrad, with major attacks against the 3rd and 4th Armies and an encirclement of the German 6th Army. The German command dismissed such concerns as "alarmist". Marshal Ion Antonescu suggested a withdrawal of Axis forces to the fortified Carpathian–FNB (Focșani–Nămoloasa–Brăila)–Danube line, but Generaloberst Friessner, the commander of Army Group South Ukraine, was unwilling to consider such a move, having already been dismissed on 23 July 1944 by Hitler from Army Group North for requesting permission to retreat.

== Order of battle ==
=== Allied ===
==== Soviet ====
- 2nd Ukrainian Front – Army General Rodion Malinovsky
  - 6th Guards Tank Army – Major General Andrei Kravchenko
  - 18th Tank Corps – Major General V. I. Polozkov
  - Cavalry-Mechanized Group Gorshkov – Major General Sergey Gorshkov
    - 5th Guards Cavalry Corps
    - 23rd Tank Corps – Lieutenant General Alexey Akhmanov
  - 4th Guards Army – Lieutenant General Ivan Galanin
  - 27th Army – Lieutenant General Sergei Trofimenko
  - 52nd Army – Colonel General Konstantin Koroteyev
  - 7th Guards Army – Colonel General Mikhail Shumilov
  - 40th Army – Lieutenant General Filipp Zhmachenko
  - 53rd Army – Lieutenant General Ivan Managarov
- 3rd Ukrainian Front – Army General Fyodor Tolbukhin
  - 5th Shock Army – Lieutenant General Nikolai Berzarin
  - 4th Guards Mechanized Corps – Major General Vladimir Zhdanov
  - 7th Mechanized Corps – Major General Fyodor Katkov
  - 57th Army – Lieutenant General Nikolai Gagen
  - 46th Army – Lieutenant General Ivan Shlemin
  - 37th Army – Major General Mikhail Sharokhin
    - 6th Guards Rifle Corps
    - 66th Rifle Corps
- Black Sea Fleet – Sergey Gorshkov

==== United States ====
- Fifteenth Air Force – Major General Nathan F. Twining
  - 306th Fighter Wing – Brigadier General Dean C. Strother

=== Axis forces ===
Army Group South Ukraine – Generaloberst Johannes Friessner

- Army Group Dumitrescu (East)
  - Romanian 3rd Army – Colonel General Petre Dumitrescu
    - XXIX. Army Corps (Generalleutnant Anton von Bechtoldsheim): 9th Infantry, Romanian 4th Mountain and 21st Infantry Divisions,
    - Romanian II Corps: 4th Infantry Division and 15th Infantry Division
    - Coastal Defence: Romanian II Corps: 9th Infantry Division and 110th Infantry Brigade.
  - 6th Army – General der Artillerie Maximilian Fretter-Pico
    - VII Corps (General der Artillerie Ernst-Eberhard Hell) : 106th, 370th and Romanian 14th Infantry Divisions,
    - XXXXIV Corps (Generalleutnant Ludwig Müller) : 62nd, 258th, 282nd and 335th Infantry Divisions,
    - LII Corps (General der Infanterie Erich Buschenhagen) : 161st, 294th and 320th Infantry Divisions,
    - XXX Corps (Generalleutnant Georg-Wilhelm Postel) : 384th, 302nd, 257th, 15th and 306th Infantry Divisions,
  - Reserve
    - 13th Panzer Division – Generalleutnant Hans Tröger
    - Romanian 1st Cavalry Division
- Army Group Wohler (West)
  - 8th Army – General der Infanterie Otto Wöhler
    - XVII Army Corps (General der Gebirgstruppe Hans Kreysing) : 8th Jäger-Division and 3rd Mountain Division
    - Romanian VII Corps : 8th Infantry Division, 103rd and 104th Mountain Brigade
    - Romanian I Corps : 6th Infantry Division and 20th Infantry Division
    - Romanian V Corps – Lieutenant General Constantin Nicolescu: Guards Division and 4th Infantry Division
    - LVII Panzer Corps (General der Panzertruppe Friedrich Kirchner) : 46th, Romanian 1st and 13th Infantry Division and Romanian 1st Armoured Division "Groß-Rumänien"
  - Romanian 4th Army – Lieutenant General Ioan Mihail Racoviță, replaced by Ilie Șteflea on 23 August
    - Romanian VI Corps : 5th Infantry Division, 102nd Mountain Brigade and German 76th Infantry Division,
    - Romanian IV Corps : 3rd Infantry Division, 7th Infantry Division and 102nd Mountain Brigade
    - IV Corps (General der Infanterie Friedrich Mieth) : 79th, 376th and Romanian 11th Infantry Divisions.
  - Reserve
    - 10th Panzergrenadier Division – Generalleutnant August Schmidt
    - 153rd Feldausbildungs-Division - Generalleutnant Friedrich Bayer

==== 1st Romanian Armoured Division ====
The 1st Romanian Armored Division did not have all of its units immediately available for opposing the Soviet offensive. Some of its units were still in the interior as of 20 August. Therefore, an ad hoc organization of the Division's units which were actually available for opposing the Soviet offensive lists the Division's 80 front line tanks as follows (not including the Division's 12 armored cars):

Name	Type	Country of Origin	Quantity
Panzer IV	Medium tank	Nazi Germany	48
Sturmgeschütz III	Assault gun	Nazi Germany	22
TACAM T-60	Tank destroyer	Romania	10

The Division also had a dedicated anti-tank battalion. Its main weapons were entirely of Romanian origin: 10 TACAM T-60 tank destroyers and 24 75 mm Reșița field/anti-tank guns. The 24 guns were the first ones produced of this model.

The 1st Romanian Armored Division had lost 34 armored fighting vehicles by 23 August, but claimed 60 Soviet tanks on 20 August alone.

== Soviet strategy ==
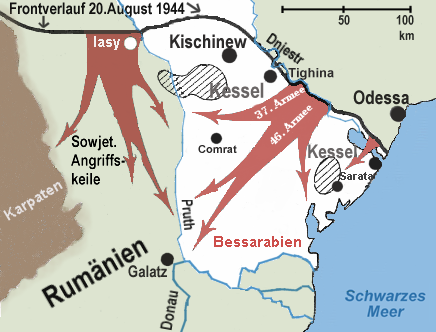
Soviet operations

Stavka's plan for the operation was based on a double envelopment of German and Romanian armies by the 2nd and 3rd Ukrainian Fronts.

The 2nd Ukrainian Front was to break through north of Iași, and then commit mobile formations to seize the Prut River crossings before withdrawing German units of the 6th Army could reach it. It was then to unleash the 6th Tank Army to seize the Siret River crossings and the Focșani Gate, a fortified line between the Siret River and the Danube.

The 3rd Ukrainian Front was to attack out of its bridgehead across the Dniester near Tiraspol, and then release mobile formations to head north and meet the mobile formations of the 2nd Ukrainian Front. This would lead to the encirclement of the German forces near Chișinău.

Following the successful encirclement, the 6th Tank Army and the 4th Guards Mechanised Corps were to advance towards Bucharest and the Ploiești oil fields.

== Progress of the offensive ==
=== General ===
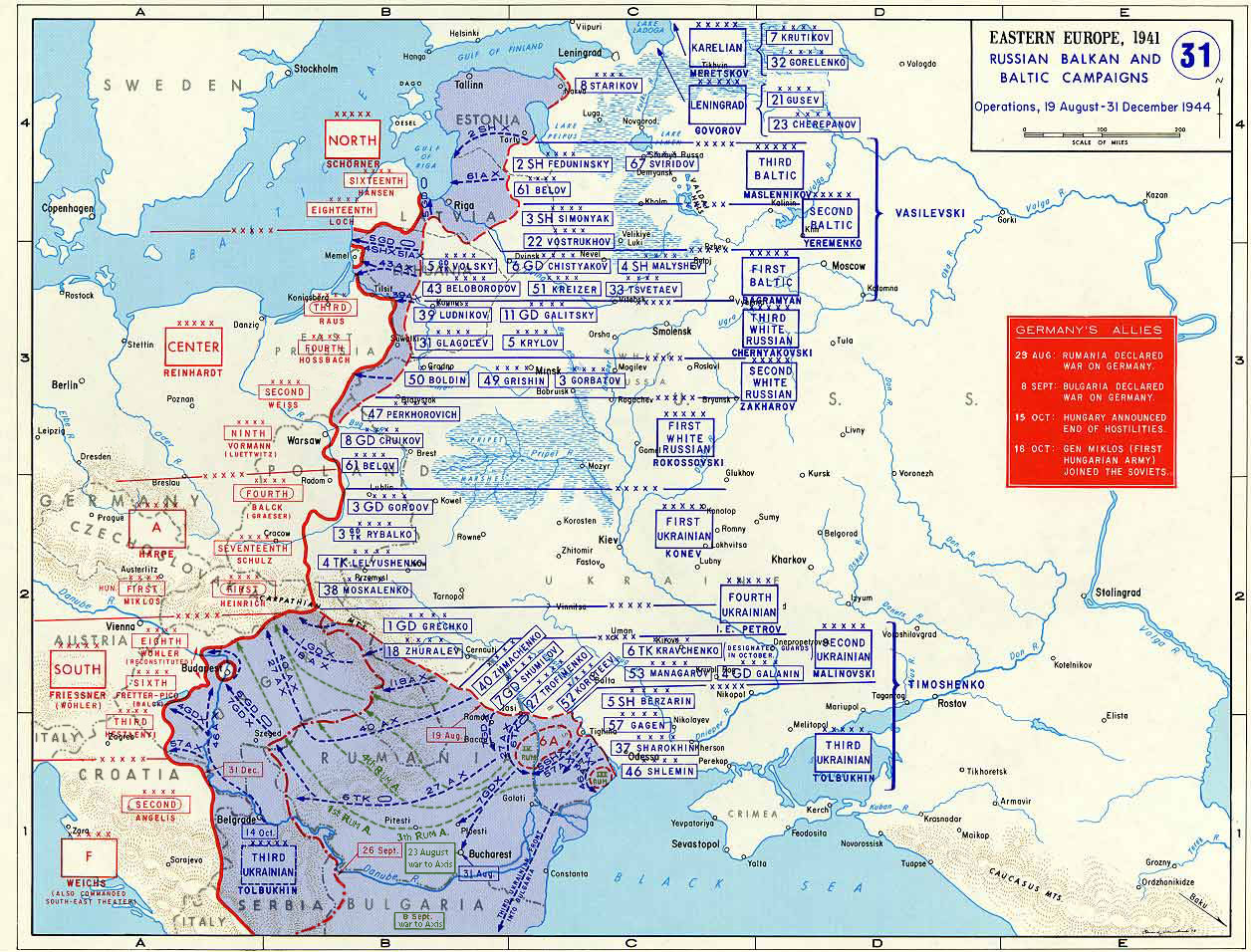
Soviet Operations, 19 August–31 December 1944

Both the 2nd and the 3rd Ukrainian Fronts undertook a major effort, leading to a double envelopment of the German Sixth Army and parts of the Eighth Army. The German–Romanian front line collapsed within two days of the start of the offensive, and 6th Guards Mechanized Corps was inserted as the main mobile group of the offensive. The initial breakthrough in the 6th Army's sector was 40 km (25 mi) deep, and destroyed rear-area supply installations by the evening of 21 August. By 23 August, the 13th Panzer Division was no longer a coherent fighting force, and the German 6th Army had been encircled to a depth of 100 km (62 mi). The Red Army mobile group managed to cut off the retreat of the German formations into Hungary. Isolated pockets of German units tried to fight their way through, but only small remnants managed to escape the encirclement.

=== Detailed study of the Soviet breakthrough ===
The main effort of the front was in the sector of the 37th Army, commanded by Lieutenant General Sharokhin, by the 66th and 6th Guards Rifle Corps. The 37th Army had a 4 km (2.5 mi)-wide breakthrough frontage assigned to it. It was divided in two groupings, two corps in the first echelon, and one in reserve. According to the plan, it was to break through the German–Romanian defence lines in seven days, to a distance of 110–120 km (68–75 mi), with the goal of covering 15 km (9.3 mi) per day during the first four days.

The 66th Rifle Corps, under Major General Kupriyanov, consisted of the 61st Guards Rifle and 333rd Rifle Divisions in the first echelon and the 244th Rifle Division in reserve. Attached were the 46th Gun Artillery Brigade, 152nd Howitzer Artillery Regiment, 184th and 1245th Tank Destroyer Regiment, 10th Mortar Regiment, 26th Light Artillery Brigade, 87th Recoilless Mortar Regiment, 92nd and 52nd Tank Regiment, 398th Assault Gun Regiment, two pioneer assault battalions, and two light flamethrower companies.

Corps frontage: 4 km (2.5 mi)
Corps breakthrough frontage: 3.5 km (2.2 mi) (61st Rifle Division 1.5 km (0.93 mi), 333rd Rifle Division 2 km (1.2 mi))

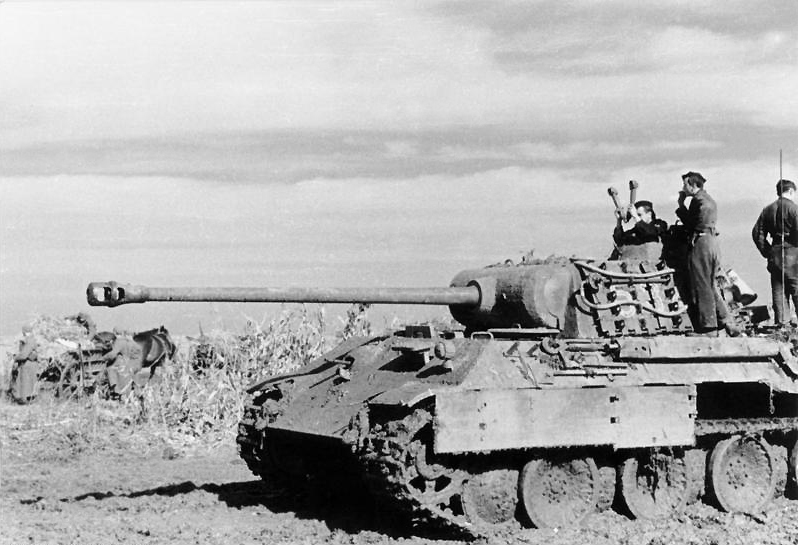
A German Panther tank in Romania, August 1944

Troop density per kilometer of frontage:

- Rifle battalions – 7.7
- Guns/mortars – 248
- Tanks and assault guns – 18

Superiority:

- Infantry – 3:1
- Artillery – 7:1
- Tanks and assault guns – 11.2:1

There is no manpower information on the divisions, but they probably had between 7,000 and 7,500 men each, with the 61st Guards Rifle Division perhaps mustering 8,000–9,000. The soldiers were prepared over the course of August by exercising in areas similar to those they were to attack, with emphasis on special tactics needed to overcome the enemy in their sector.

Troops density in the 61st Guards Rifle Division's sector per kilometer of frontage was:

- Rifle battalions – 6.0
- Guns/mortars – 234
- Tanks and assault guns – 18

Troops density in the 333rd Rifle Division's sector per kilometer of frontage was:

- Rifle battalions – 4.5
- Guns/mortars – 231
- Tanks and assault guns – 18

=== Initial attack ===
The 333rd Rifle Division put three regiments in the first echelon and had none in reserve. The 61st Guards Rifle Division attacked in a standard formation, with two regiments in the first echelon and one in reserve. This proved to be fortunate, because the right wing of the 188th Guards Rifle Regiment was unable to advance past the Plopschtubej strongpoint. The 189th Guards Rifle Regiment on the left wing made good progress though, as did 333rd Rifle Division on its left. The commander of the 61st Guards Rifle Division therefore inserted his reserve (the 187th Guards Rifle Regiment) behind the 189th Guards Rifle Regiment to exploit the breakthrough. When darkness came, the 244th Rifle Division was assigned to break through the second line of defense. It lost its way, and only arrived at 23:00, by which time elements of the 13th Panzer Division were counterattacking.

The German–Romanian opposition was XXX. and XXIX. AK, with the 15th and 306th German Infantry Divisions, the 4th Romanian Mountain Division, and the 21st Romanian Infantry Division. The 13th Panzer Division was in reserve. At the end of the first day, the 4th Romanian Mountain (General de divizie, (Major General) Gheorghe Manoliu), and 21st Romanian Divisions were almost completely destroyed, while the German 15th and 306th Infantry Divisions suffered heavy losses (according to a German source, the 306th Infantry lost 50% in the barrage, and was destroyed apart from local strong-points by evening). Almost no artillery survived the fire preparation.

The 13th Panzer Division counterattacked the 66th Rifle Corps on the first day, and tried to stop its progress the next day to no avail. A study on the division's history says 'The Russians [Soviets] dictated the course of events.' The 13th Panzer Division at the time was a materially underequipped, but high manpower unit, with a high proportion of recent reinforcements. It only had Panzer IVs, StuG IIIs and self-propelled anti-tank guns. By the end of the second day, the division was incapable of attacking or putting up meaningful resistance.

At the end of the second day, the 3rd Ukrainian Front stood deep in the rear of the German 6th Army. No more organised re-supply of forces would be forthcoming, and the 6th Army was doomed to be encircled and destroyed again. Franz-Josef Strauss, who was to become an important German politician after the war, served with the Panzer Regiment of the 13th Panzer Division. He comments that the division had ceased to exist as a tactical unit on the third day of the Soviet offensive: 'The enemy was everywhere.'

In Mazulenko, results of the operations of the 66th Rifle Corps were described: "Because of the reinforcement of the Corps and the deep battle arrangements of troops and units the enemy defenses were broken through at high speed."

German survivors of the initial attack stated "By the end of the barrage, Russian [Soviet] tanks were deep into our position." (Hoffman). A German battalion commander, Hauptmann Hans Diebisch, Commander II./IR579, 306.ID, commented "The fire assets of the German defense were literally destroyed by the Soviet fighter bombers attacking the main line of resistance and the rear positions. When the Russian infantry suddenly appeared inside the positions of the battalion and it tried to retreat, the Russian air force made this impossible. The battalion was dispersed and partly destroyed by air attacks and mortar and machine gun fire."

=== Alleged Romanian collapse ===
It is often alleged that the speed and totality of the German collapse were caused by Romanian betrayal, for example, in Heinz Guderian's 1952 autobiography Panzer Leader. The study of the combat operations by Mazulenko indicates that this is probably not correct. Romanian formations did resist the Soviet attack in many cases, but were ill-equipped to defend themselves effectively against a modern army due to a lack of modern anti-tank, artillery, and anti-air weapons. In contrast to German claims, for instance, in the symposium notes published by David Glantz, or in the history of the offensive published by Kissel, it appears that the Romanian 1st Armoured Division did offer resistance against the Soviet breakthrough. However, Mark Axworthy states in his book that the battered 1st Armoured Division maintained cohesion, experiencing some local, costly successes before being forced to cross the Moldova River. Axworthy claims that the postwar Communist government would have obviously used this act of "betrayal" for propaganda purposes. Also, there are no Soviet reports of collaboration before 24 August 1944. The Soviet rates of progress imply an ineffective defense of the Romanian troops, rather than active collaboration and en-masse surrender.

Ion. S. Dumitru was a Romanian tank commander in the battle of the Romanian 1st Armoured Division against Soviet tanks and he described the battle in his book. According to Dumitru, fighting took place near the village of Scobâlțeni in the vicinity of a town called Podu Iloaiei on 20 August. The Romanian division destroyed 60 Soviet tanks and lost 30 tanks. At the end of the day, Romanians decided to retreat to the south after an analysis of the military results of the day.

The complete collapse of the German 6th Army and the Romanian 4th Army was more likely caused by the inability of the numerous horse-drawn infantry divisions to maintain cohesion while retreating and under attack of the Soviet mechanized troops. This claim is reinforced by the fact that the only Romanian division which retained its cohesion under the Soviet attack was the 1st Armoured Division, which had the mobility and the anti-tank weapons needed to do so.

The surrender of Romania took place at a time when the Soviet Army had already moved deep inside Romania, and the German 6th Army had been cut off from the rest of the Wehrmacht in Romania. The opening of hostilities between the Wehrmacht and the Romanian Army commenced after a failed coup d'état by the German ambassador.

=== German–Romanian combat ===
Military operations, 23–31 August 1944: red = Soviet Red army; yellow = Romanian troops; blue = Axis forces, frontlines

Simultaneously, a coup d'état led by King Michael of Romania on 23 August deposed Antonescu and withdrew Romania from the Axis. By this time, the bulk of the German and Romanian armies had either been destroyed or cut off by the Soviet offensive, with only residual and rear-echelon forces present in the Romanian interior. Hitler immediately ordered special forces under the command of Otto Skorzeny and Arthur Phleps, stationed in nearby Yugoslavia, to intervene in support of the remaining German troops, which were mostly concentrated around Bucharest, Ploiești, Brașov, and Giurgiu. General Alfred Gerstenberg, commander of the Luftwaffe defenses around the oilfields at Ploiești, had already ordered a column of motorized troops to attack Bucharest on the evening of 23 August. Open hostilities between German and Romanian forces began the following morning on the city's northern outskirts. After capturing the airfield at Otopeni, the attack stalled, and by 28 August Gerstenberg and the remaining German forces in the vicinity of Bucharest surrendered. The fighting here featured the only instance of cooperation between Romanian and Western Allied forces during the campaign, when Romanian ground troops requested a USAAF bombing raid on the Băneasa Forest. Poor coordination however led to friendly fire when American bombers accidentally hit a company of Romanian paratroopers.

Meanwhile, Brandenburger special forces landed at Boteni and Țăndărei airfields on 24 August in an attempt to immobilize the Romanian aircraft there, but they were overpowered by Romanian paratroopers and security companies before they could achieve their objectives. A proposed operation to rescue Antonescu, led by Skorzeny and inspired by the Gran Sasso raid which liberated Benito Mussolini in 1943, could not materialize as Antonescu's whereabouts were unknown even to the Romanian government until 30 August, when he was handed over to the Soviets and shipped to Moscow. Another group of Brandenburgers joined Gerstenberg's unsuccessful drive on Bucharest on 25 August and were captured three days later. Altogether, these events constituted one of the worst defeats suffered by the German special forces in the war.

The German situation was further complicated by the loss of Brașov and the Predeal Pass, both of which were secured by the Romanian 1st Mountain Division by 25 August, thus cutting off the most direct route of reinforcement or retreat for the remaining Wehrmacht formations to the south. The following day, the Romanian 2nd Territorial Corps captured Giurgiu and neutralized the German AA units there, taking 9,000 prisoners in the process. The 25,000-strong German presence around Ploiești, consisting mostly of flak troops and their security companies, was at first locked in a stalemate with the Romanian 5th Territorial Corps, which had a similar numerical strength. Over the following days however, the Germans were gradually confined to the city's immediate surroundings and became heavily outnumbered as Romanian reinforcements began arriving from Bucharest and also from the east, together with lead elements of a Soviet motorized brigade. On 30 August, an attack by the 5th Territorial Corps, now numbering over 40,000 men, reduced the Germans to a pocket around the village of Păulești, roughly 10 km (6.2 mi) north of Ploiești. They surrendered the following day after a failed breakout attempt. About 2,000 Germans were able to escape to the Hungarian lines across the Carpathians. Other major cities and industrial centers, such as Constanța, Reșița, and Sibiu were secured by the Romanians with relative ease. By 31 August, all German resistance in Romania had been cleared.

During the fighting between 23 and 31 August, the Romanian Army captured 56,000 German prisoners, who were later surrendered to the Soviet Army. A further 5,000 Germans were killed in action, while Romanian casualties amounted to 8,600 killed and wounded.

Romanian sources claim that internal factors played a decisive role in Romania's switch of allegiance, while external factors only gave support; this version is markedly different from the Soviet position on the events, which holds that the offensive resulted in the Romanian coup and "liberated Romania with the help of local insurgents".

== Aftermath ==
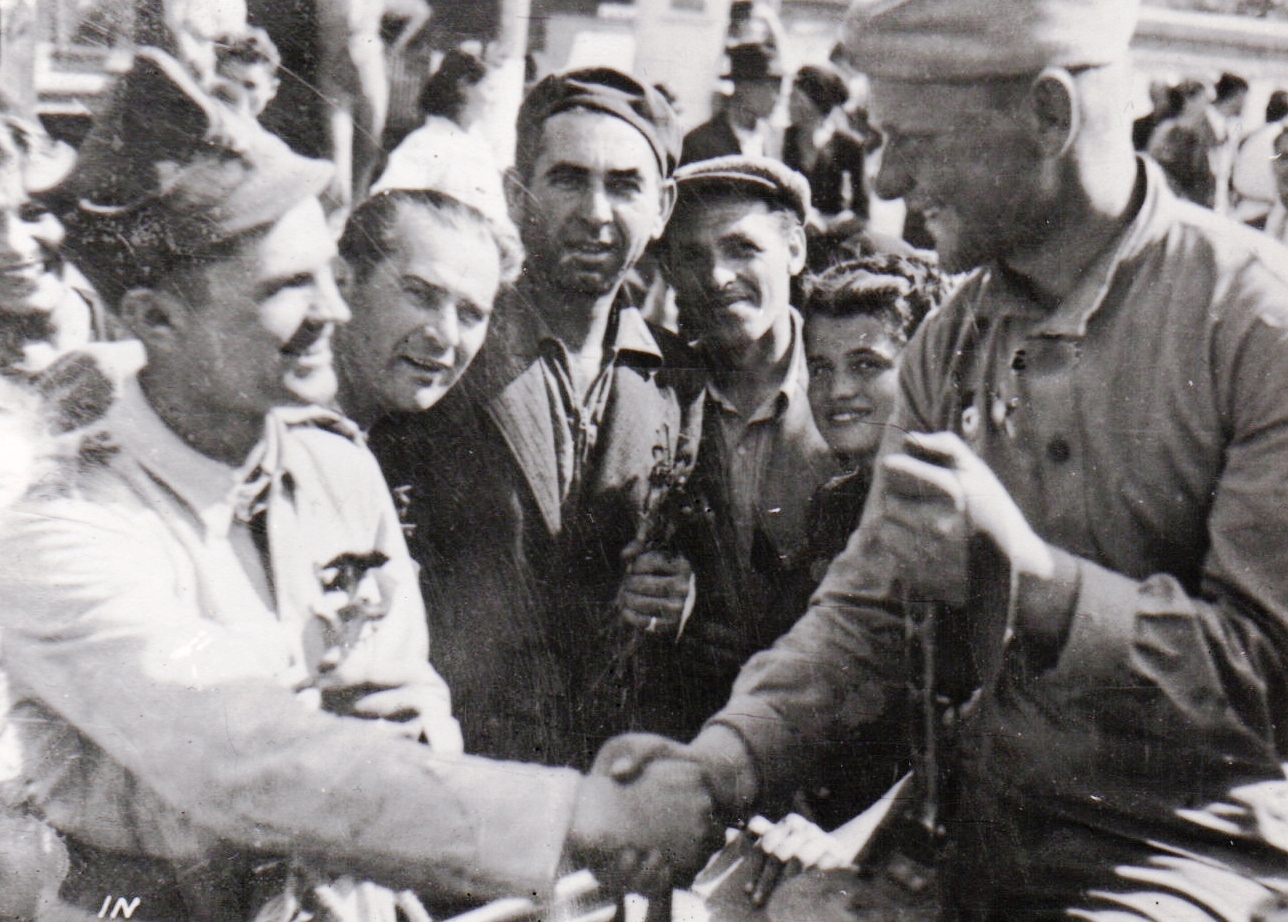
Romanian and Soviet soldiers shaking hands in Bucharest after the coup, 30 August

The German formations suffered significant irrecoverable losses, with over 115,000 prisoners taken, while Soviet casualties were unusually low for an operation of this size. The Red Army advanced into Yugoslavia and forced the rapid withdrawal of the German Army Groups E and F from Greece, Albania, and Yugoslavia to avoid being cut off. Together with Yugoslav Partisans and Bulgaria, they liberated the capital city of Belgrade on 20 October.

On the political level, the Soviet offensive triggered King Michael's coup d'état in Romania, and the switch of Romania from the Axis to the Allies. Almost immediately, border hostilities between Romania and Germany's ally Hungary erupted over territory that Romania had been forced to cede to Hungary in 1940 as a result of the Second Vienna Award. Romania's defection meant the loss of a vital source of oil for Germany, leading to serious fuel shortages in the Wehrmacht by the end of 1944 and prompting Hitler's first admission that the war was lost.

Following the success of the operation, Soviet control over Bessarabia and Northern Bukovina, which had been occupied by the USSR in 1940, was re-established. Soviet forces proceeded to collect and expel the remaining Romanian troops. According to Anatol Petrencu, President of the Historians' Association of Moldova, over 170,000 Romanian soldiers were deported, 40,000 of which were incarcerated in a prisoner-of-war camp at Bălți, where many died of hunger, cold, disease, or execution.

In Soviet history, this offensive was listed as one of Stalin's ten blows.

== Legacy ==
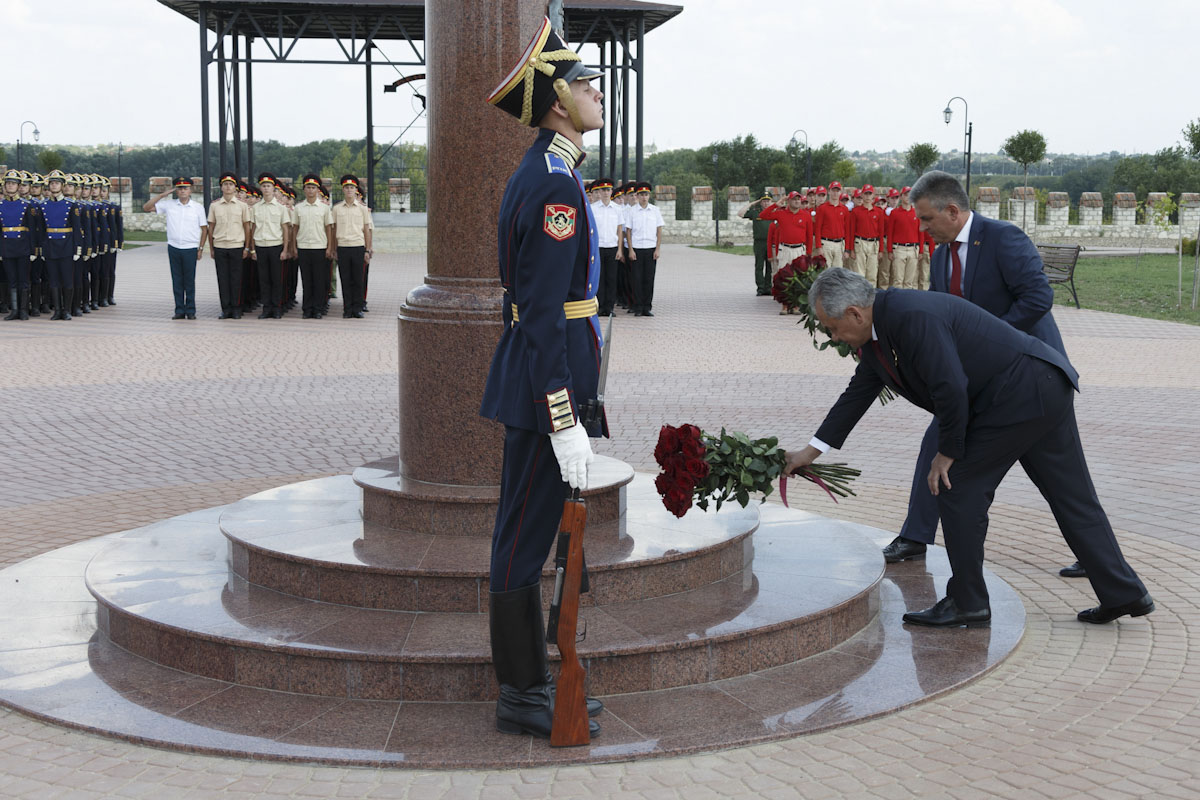
Sergey Shoigu with Vadim Krasnoselsky laying flowers on 23 August.

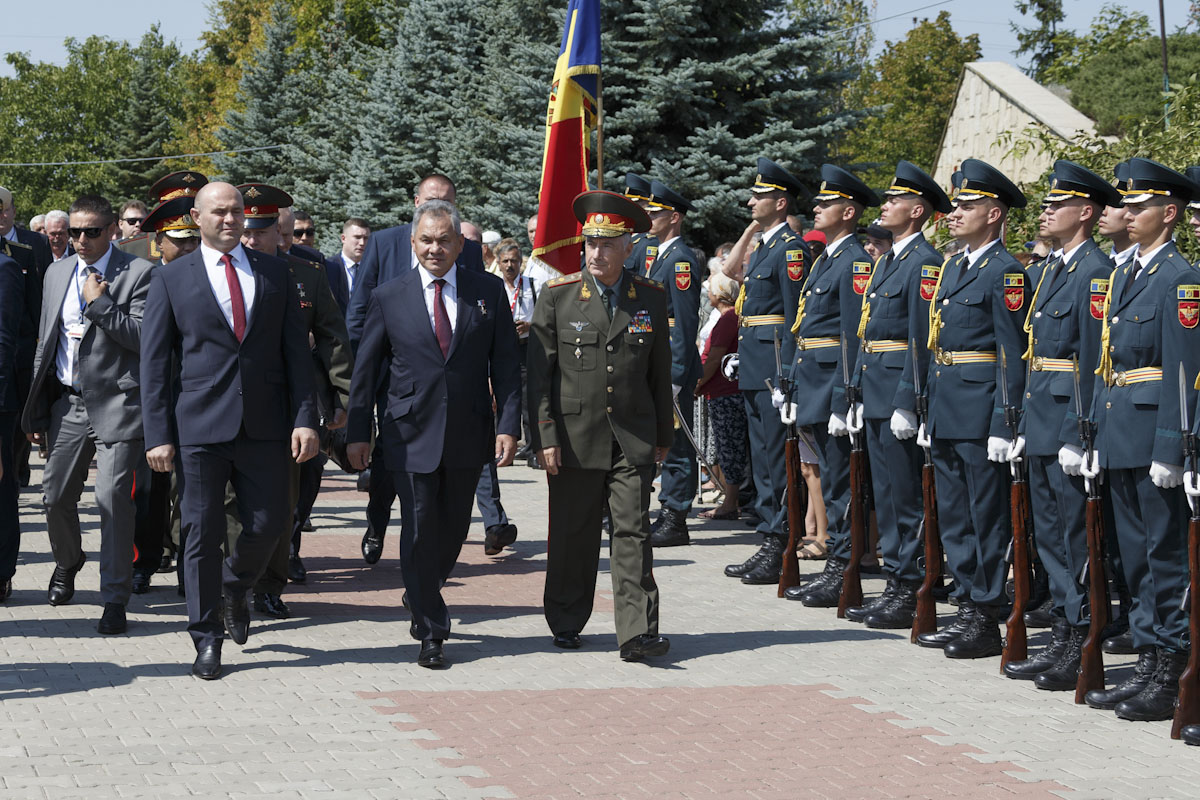
Members of the Honor Guard Company of the Moldovan National Army being inspected by Sergey Shoigu, Pavel Voicu and Victor Gaiciuc during the 24 August celebrations in 2019.

In Moldova and the breakaway state Transnistria, August 24 is a public holiday, and is known officially as Liberation Day. King Michael's coup on August 23 was also celebrated in neighboring Romania as Liberation from Fascist Occupation Day until 1990. In 1970, a street in Botanica was named in honor of Aleksei Belsky, a Hero of the Soviet Union and a participant in the second Jassy–Kishinev offensive. After the collapse of the USSR, the street was renamed to honor Alexandru Ioan Cuza. The village of Malinovscoe, in the Rîșcani District, named in honor of the Marshal Rodion Malinovsky was dedicated to the anniversary of the end of the operation.

=== Monuments ===
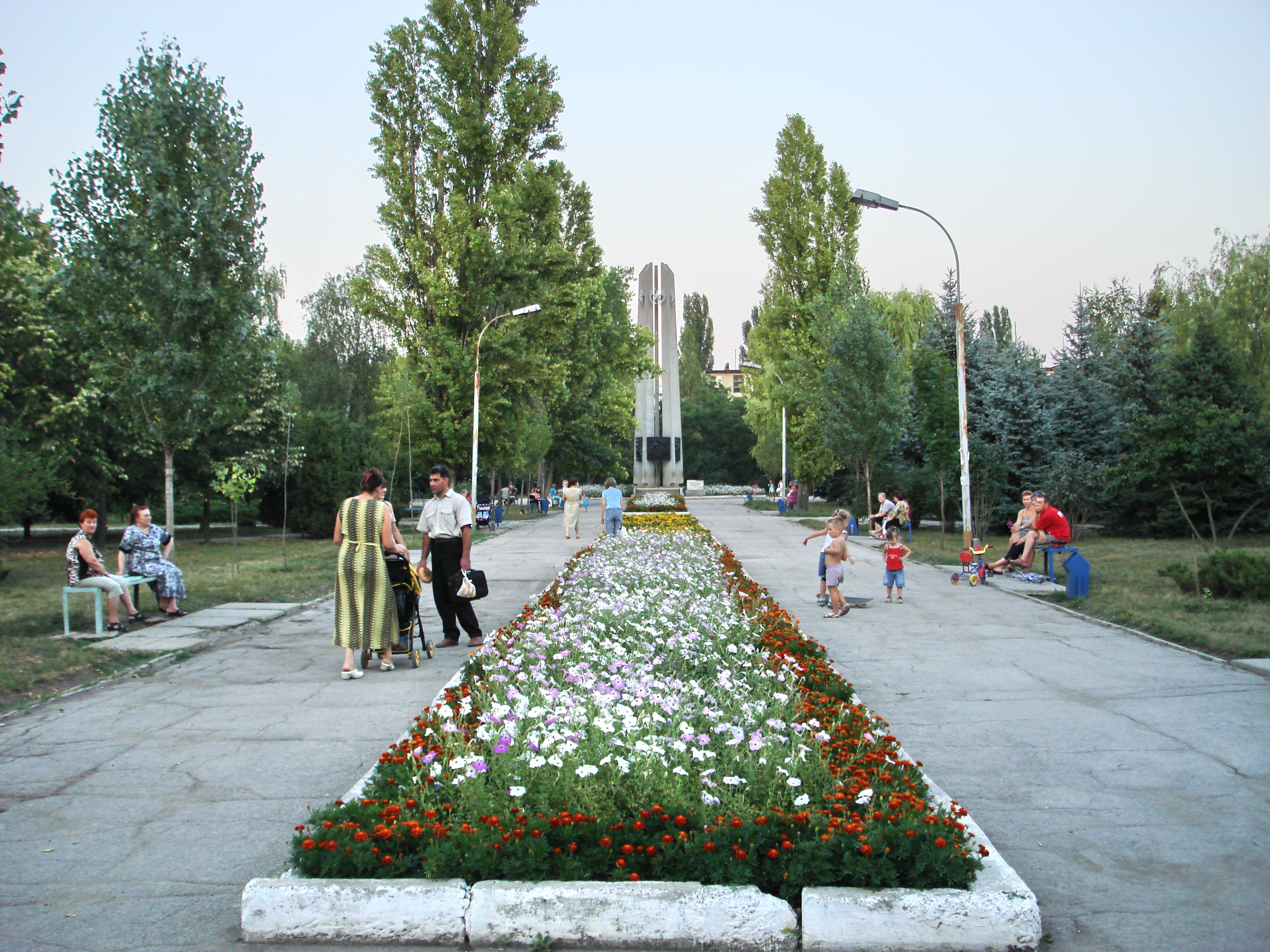
The "Monument in honor of the 40th anniversary of the liberation of Bender from the German-Romanian invaders" in the Victory Park, Bender, Moldova

On 23 August 1969, during the 25th anniversary of the offensive, a liberation monument at the Academy of Sciences of Moldova was opened. It has been renovated two times, in 1975 and 2019. In 2014, a demolition of it was considered. The monument to the second Jassy–Kishinev offensive in the village of Chițcani was opened on 9 May 1972 and is currently the site of the monument is a mass grave, in which 1,495 soldiers who died during the operation are buried. The Capul de pod Șerpeni Memorial Complex was opened in 2004. Two years later, the Eternity Memorial Complex in Chișinău was opened on Liberation Day, acting as the Soviet war memorial in Moldova.

=== Events ===
In 2019, President Igor Dodon dedicated the year to the 75th anniversary of the Liberation of Moldova, and ordered that a National Coordination Committee plan national events and celebrations throughout the country in honor of the anniversary. On the actual anniversary, celebrations were held, led by Dodon and attended by Russian Defence Minister Sergey Shoigu at the request of Moldovan Defence Minister Pavel Voicu.

A ceremony with Dodon, Shoigu and Voicu in attendance at the Capul de pod Șerpeni Memorial Complex was held, in which Shoigu ceremonially handed Voicu the military flags of two Moldovan regiments who participated in the offensive, which until then, were kept at the Central Armed Forces Museum. A separate ceremony at the Transnistria-based Operational Group of Russian Forces was also held.

== Bibliography ==
- Art of War Symposium, From the Dnepr to the Vistula: Soviet Offensive Operations – November 1943 – August 1944, A transcript of Proceedings, Center for Land Warfare, US Army War College, 29 April – 3 May 1985, Col. D.M. Glantz ed., Fort Leavewnworth, Kansas, 1992
- Axworthy, Mark; Scafeș, Cornel; Crăciunoiu, Cristian (1995). Third Axis, Fourth Ally: Romanian Armed Forces in the European War, 1941–1945. London: Arms & Armour. ISBN 1-85409-267-7.
- Erickson, John (1989) [1983]. The Road to Berlin, Stalin's War with Germany, Volume 2. Yale University Press. pp. 715–719 & 356–369. ISBN 0-300-07813-7.
- House, Jonathan M.; Glantz, David M. (1995). When Titans clashed: how the Red Army stopped Hitler. Lawrence: University Press of Kansas. ISBN 0-7006-0717-X.
- Frieser, Karl-Heinz; Schmider, Klaus; Schönherr, Klaus; Schreiber, Gerhard; Ungváry, Kristián; Wegner, Bernd (2007). Die Ostfront 1943/44 – Der Krieg im Osten und an den Nebenfronten [The Eastern Front 1943–1944: The War in the East and on the Neighbouring Fronts]. Das Deutsche Reich und der Zweite Weltkrieg (Germany and the Second World War) (in German). Vol. VIII. München: Deutsche Verlags-Anstalt. ISBN 978-3-421-06235-2.
- Glantz, David M. (2007). Red Storm Over the Balkans: The Failed Soviet Invasion of Romania, Spring 1944. University Press of Kansas. ISBN 978-0-7006-1465-3.
- Maculenko, Viktor Antonovič; Balcerowiak, Ina (1959). Die Zerschlagung der Heeresgruppe Südukraine: Aug.–Sept. 1944 (in German). Berlin: Verl. d. Ministeriums f. nationale Verteidigung. OCLC 72234885.
- Hoffmann, Dieter (2001). Die Magdeburger Division: zur Geschichte der 13. Infanterie- und 13. Panzer-Division 1935–1945 (in German). Hamburg: Mittler. ISBN 3-8132-0746-3.
- Kissel, Hans (1964). Die Katastrophe in Rumänien 1944 (in German). Darmstadt: Wehr und Wissen Verlagsgesellschaft mbH. p. 287. OCLC 163808506.
- Ziemke, E.F. Stalingrad to Berlin: The German Defeat in the East, Office of the Chief of Military History, U.S. Army; 1st edition, Washington D.C., 1968
- Dumitru, Ion S. (1999). Tancuri în flăcări. Amintiri din cel de-al doilea război mondial [Tanks in flames. Memories of the Second World War] (in Romanian). Bucharest: Nemira. p. 464. OCLC 80266325.
- Roper, Steven D. Romania: The Unfinished Revolution (Postcommunist States and Nations), Routledge; 1 edition, 2000, ISBN 978-90-5823-027-0
- Tismăneanu, Vladimir (2003). Stalinism for All Seasons: A Political History of Romanian Communism. Berkeley: University of California Press. p. 86. ISBN 0-520-23747-1.
