= Liberation Monument (Chișinău) =

Monument in Chișinău, Moldova

Coordinates: 47°00′49″N 28°50′56″E

The Liberation Monument in 2025

The Liberation Monument (Romanian: monumentul "Eliberarea", "Eliberarea Moldovei") is a monument in Chișinău, Moldova, commemorating the second Jassy–Kishinev offensive of 1944. Having taken place in eastern Romania, the offensive brought the territory of modern Moldova back to Soviet control.

== History ==
The monument was inaugurated on 23 August 1969, on the occasion of the 25th anniversary of the second Jassy–Kishinev offensive through which the territory of the Kingdom of Romania composing modern Moldova was brought under the control of the Soviet Union. It was erected in front of the Academy of Sciences of Moldova.

Sculptors Naum Epelbaum and Lazar Dubinovsky were part of the project.

It was renovated in 1975 and in 2019. In 2014, it was proposed to demolish the monument and replace it with another one, for the Romanian language.

== See also ==
- Eternity Memorial Complex, Chișinău
