= Army Museum of Chișinău =

Coordinates: 47.01577474582726°N 28.840606956313266°E

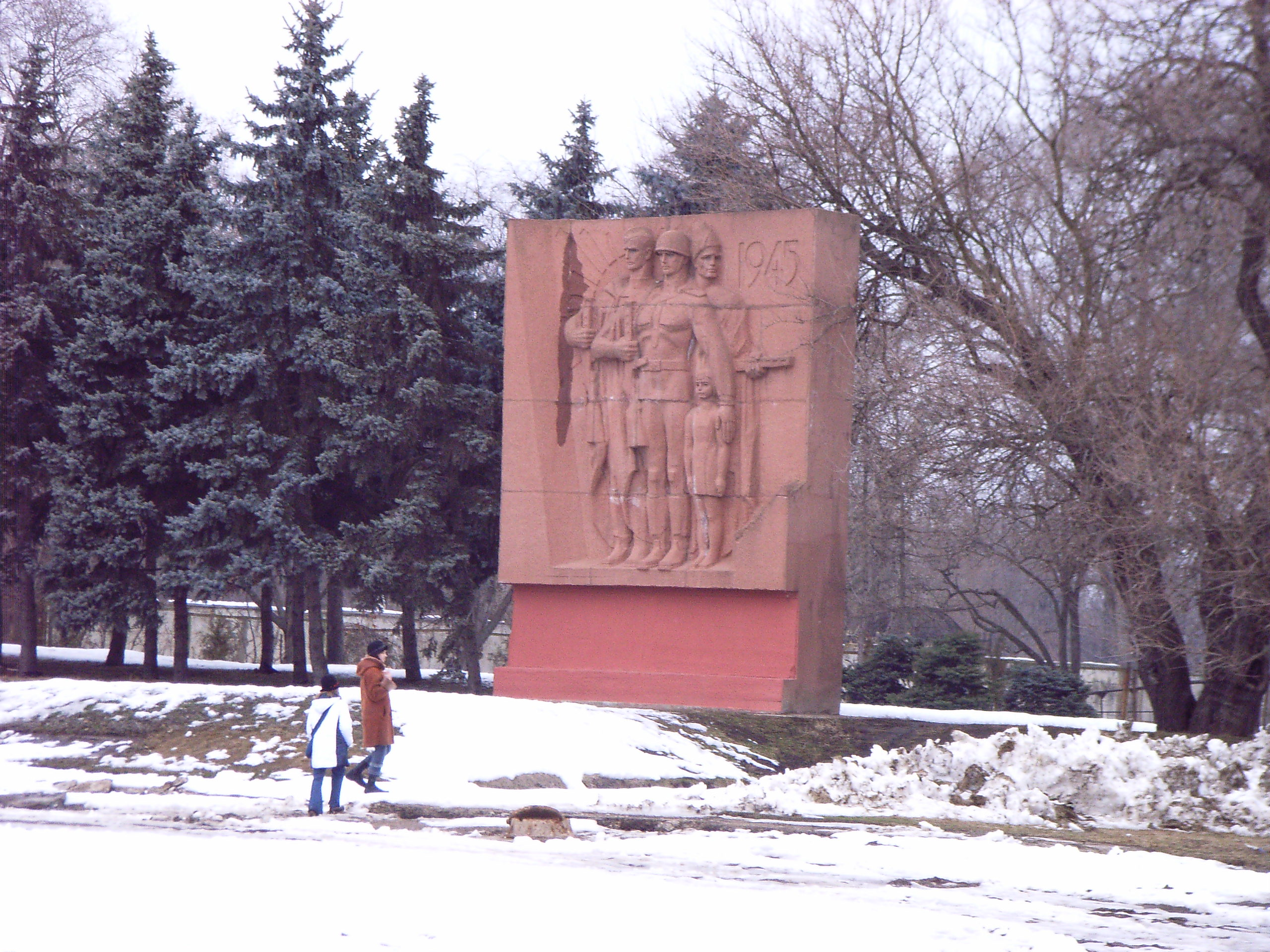
A structure at the museum.

The Army Museum of Chișinău (Romanian: Muzeul armatei din Chișinău), is a center of military history of the Armed Forces of Moldova located in northern Chișinău, the capital of Moldova.

== Description ==
It is located on 47 Tighina Street and is within the command structure of the Center of Military History and Culture, subordinated to the Ministry of Defense of Moldova. The museum has been in operation since 1999. It is located in the building of the former Soviet Army House of Officers. Its mission is to collect, preserve and capitalize on cultural and historical assets and to reflect through museum pieces the evolution of national military history and art. The museum's exhibitions are arranged chronologically from prehistory to the stage of the "Contemporary National Army". Among the museum's exhibits are: weapons; military harness and clothing, military equipment, heraldic objects, original images, vintage documents, maps, etc. The museum holds a permanent exhibition dedicated to the Second World War and presents a wide range of weapons, Red Army and NKVD uniforms, and Soviet propaganda. The institution publishes the military history magazine Cohorta. In 2003, the Capul de pod Șerpeni Memorial Complex was put under the supervision of the museum. The museum also has a basic exhibition on Soviet terror.

In August 2020, a ceremony of transferring 150 cartridges with soil taken from the graves of soldiers who died in World War II to the Military Museum took place. It was part of the National Action Plan dedicated to the 75th anniversary of the end of the war.

== See also ==
- Central Armed Forces Museum
- Central House of Officers of the Armed Forces of Ukraine
- National Military Museum, Romania
- Central House of Officers (Minsk)
- National Museum of History of Moldova
