= Capul de pod Șerpeni Memorial Complex =

Military memorial in Moldova

- Complexul memorial "Capul de pod Șerpeni"
- Army Museum
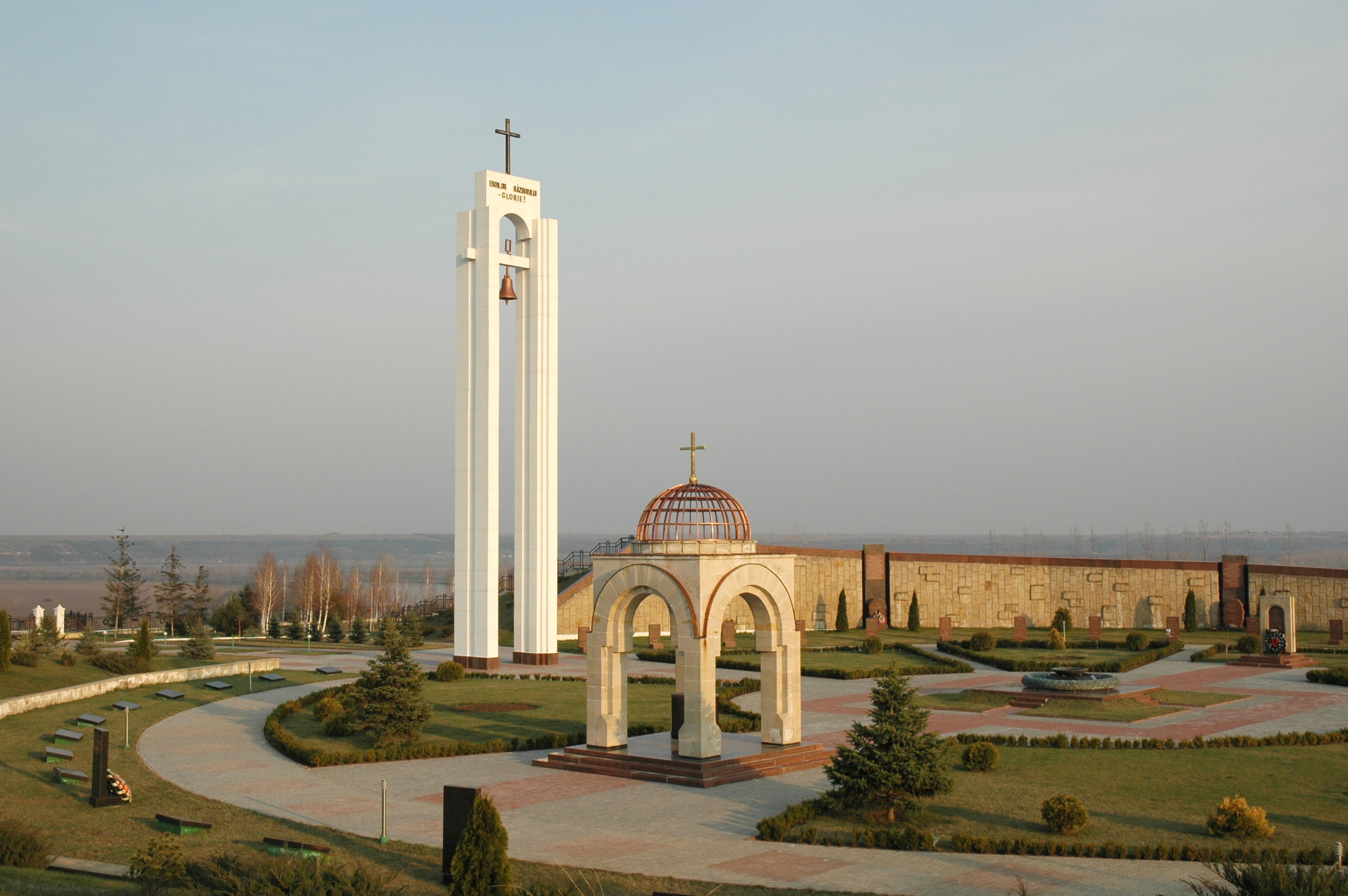
- The memorial in April 2009
- For 12,000 Red Army soldiers who died at Șerpeni Bridgehead on the Dniester in the 1944 Second Jassy–Kishinev Offensive
- Established: 1985
- Location: 47.033115°N 29.352599°E near Șerpeni

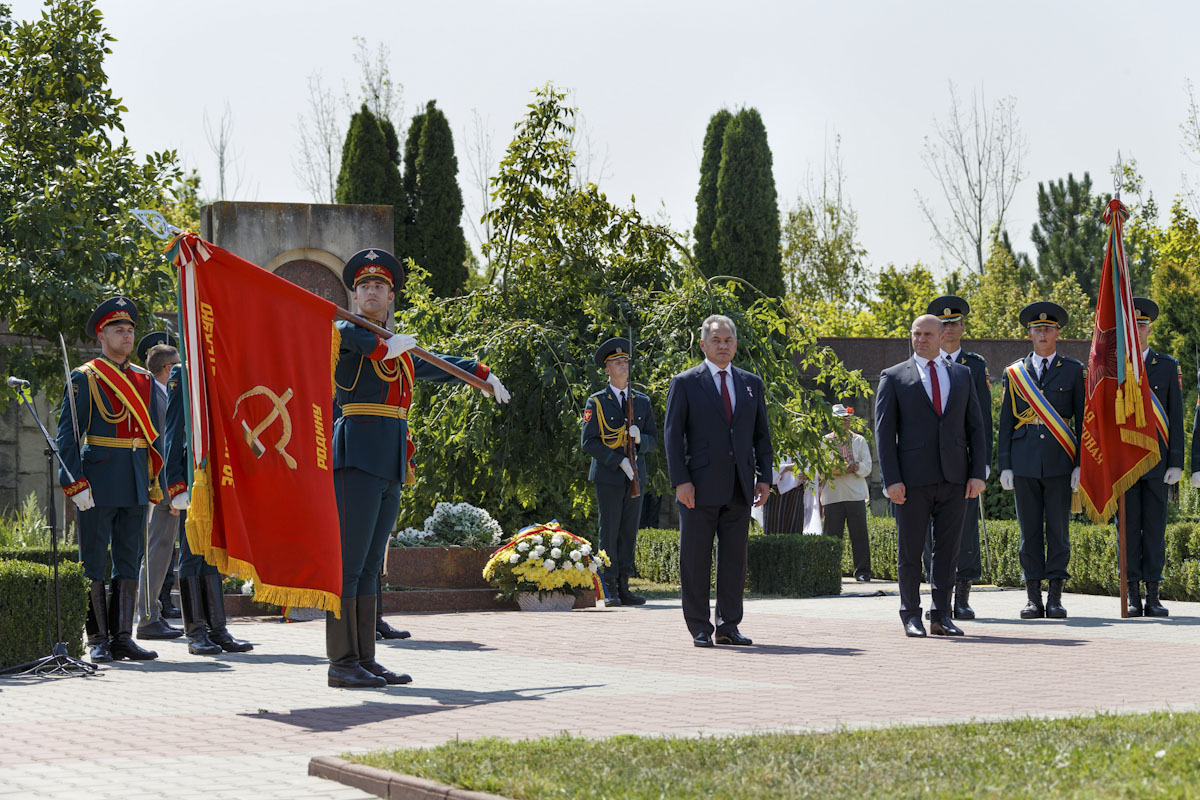
The flag ceremony at the complex in 2019.

Capul de pod Șerpeni Memorial Complex (Romanian: Complexul memorial „Capul de pod Șerpeni”) is a military memorial located in Șerpeni, a village in the Anenii Noi District of Moldova. It is dedicated to the 12,000 Red Army soldiers who died at Șerpeni Bridgehead on the Dniester in the 1944 Second Jassy–Kishinev Offensive.

== History ==
It was built on the site of a strategic bridgehead on the high right bank of the Dniester River which was liberated by troops of the 2nd and 3rd Ukrainian Fronts. The battle at the Șerpeni bridgehead was one of the bloodiest in the history of the offensive, although against the background of other battles, it was only a small episode of the war. In 1985, according to witnesses, a mass grave of Soviet soldiers who died was found in the city. In October 1985, it was decided to build a Memorial of Military Glory, on which with honors to rebury the remains of soldiers from the burial found. The competition for the best project of the memorial was won by the architect Leonid Grigorashchenko. The construction of the complex was carried out in 1995-2003. In 2003, the Government of Moldova established a coordinating council on the actions regarding the completion of the construction works. Construction also came under the supervision of the Army Museum. Dozens of people from Russia and Ukraine provided substantial support for the construction of this building on the banks of the Dniester. On 22 August 2004, seventy kilometers east of the capital of Chișinău, the memorial complex was opened by the architect S. Shoikhet and sculptor S. Ganenko. The official inauguration ceremony was attended, along with veterans from the Republic of Moldova and veterans from Ukraine, Russia, Kazakhstan, Uzbekistan, Belarus and others. A postage stamp of Moldova depicting the complex was issued in 2004 on the occasion of the 60th anniversary of the offensive. A year later, a veteran delivered a speech at the complex in which he compared it to the Mamayev Kurgan in Volgograd and the Brest Fortress in Belarus.

== Description ==
The memorial consists of three main components. On one side is a stylized altar that adorns a marble safe. In the central part, under two high pylons, connecting at the top of the cross is an eternal flame burning. A bell tower rises above the picturesque banks of the Dniester, which recalls the historical continuity of Moldova and the restoration of respect for the ancestors who previously lived in those places. From the observation deck of the bridgehead, a beautiful view of the Dniester valley and the adjacent forests, meadows and fields opens.

== Burials and ceremonies ==
The search and reburial of fallen soldiers at the complex is ongoing. On 21 March 2010, the search squad "Russian Historical and Patriotic Club" buried 14 fighters of the Red Army. On Victory Day (9 May) in 2018, members of the Party of Socialists of the Republic of Moldova participated in a solemn burial ceremony of the bones of 26 soldiers in a ceremony was organized by the National Committee "Victory", under the auspices of the President of Moldova. The ceremony was attended by the Ambassador of Russia. On the operation's diamond jubilee (75th anniversary) in 2019, a ceremony which was attended by Russian Defence Minister Sergey Shoigu, President Igor Dodon, and Moldovan Defence Minister Pavel Voicu was held at the complex. During the national ceremony, Shoigu ceremonially handed to Voicu the military flags of two all-Moldovan regiments who participated in the offensive, which until that point, were kept at the Central Armed Forces Museum in Moscow. 45 burials were held on the 75th anniversary in 2020.
