= Pavel Voicu =

Moldovan politician (born 1973)

Pavel Voicu MP
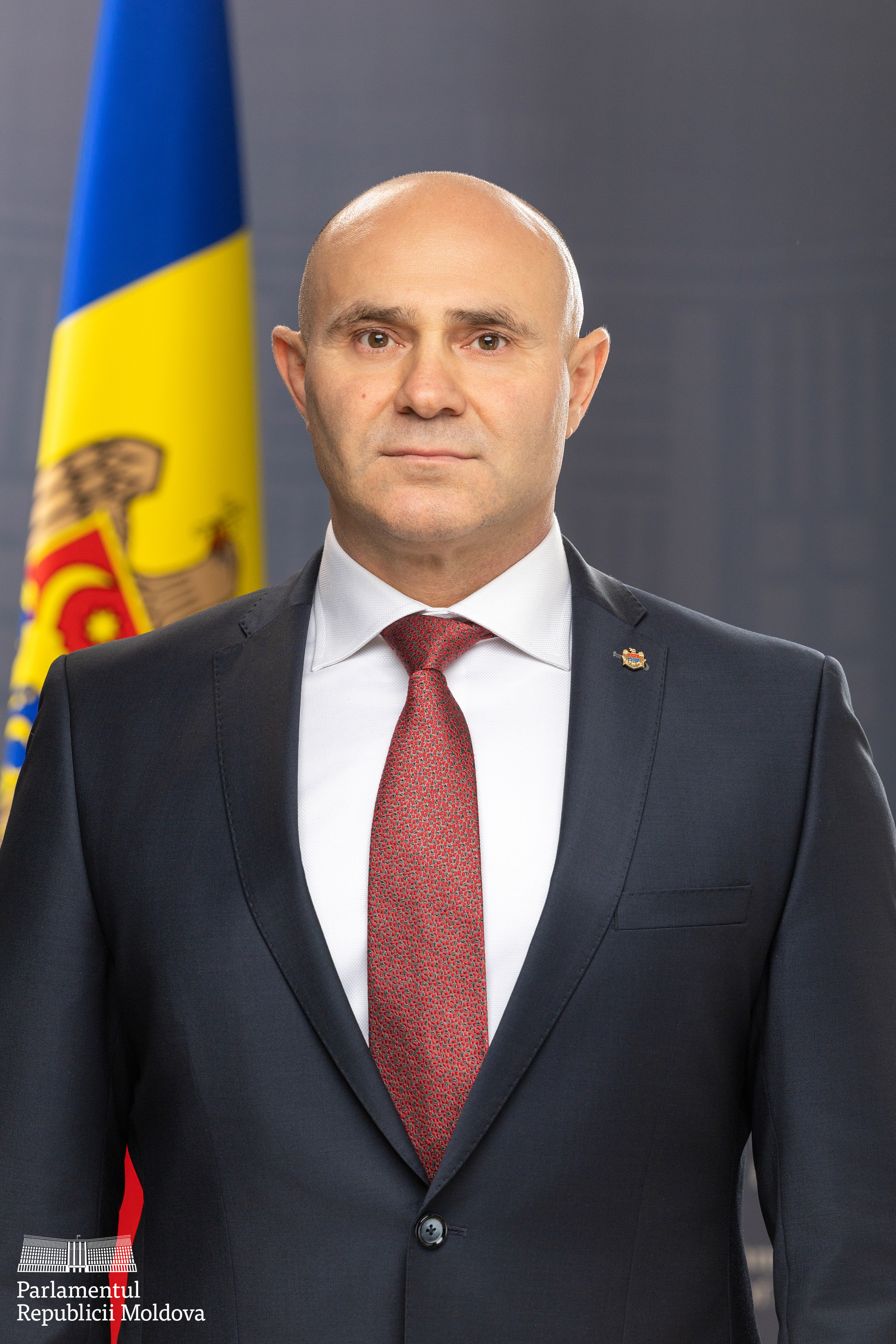
- Official portrait, 2025

Member of the Moldovan Parliament
- Incumbent
- Assumed office 22 October 2025
- Parliamentary group: Party of Socialists

Minister of Internal Affairs
- In office 14 November 2019 – 6 August 2021
- President: Igor Dodon; Maia Sandu
- Prime Minister: Ion Chicu; Aureliu Ciocoi (acting)
- Preceded by: Andrei Năstase
- Succeeded by: Ana Revenco

Minister of Defense
- In office 8 June 2019 – 14 November 2019
- President: Igor Dodon
- Prime Minister: Maia Sandu
- Preceded by: Eugen Sturza
- Succeeded by: Victor Gaiciuc

Special Missions Advisor to the President
- In office 22 August 2017 – 8 June 2019
- President: Igor Dodon

Personal details
- Born: 29 January 1973 (age 53) Măcărești, Moldavian SSR, Soviet Union (now Moldova)
- Education: Ştefan cel Mare Police Academy; Academy of Public Administration

Pavel Voicu (born 29 January 1973) is a Moldovan politician who was the Minister of Defence of Moldova in the Sandu Cabinet and the Interior Minister under President Igor Dodon and Prime Minister Ion Chicu. He was also a personal advisor to Dodon. He has prior experience in Moldovan law enforcement.

== Biography ==
Pavel Voicu was born on 29 January 1973 in Frăsinești (now Măcărești, Ungheni) in the western part of the Moldovan SSR. Between 1990 and 1995, he studied at the Ștefan cel Mare Academy of the Ministry of Internal Affairs. In the years that followed, he held various positions within the Ungheni Police Inspectorate, the Center for Combating Economic Crimes and the National Anti-corruption Center. He held the position of commissioner of the municipal police station in Călăraşi and Cimişlia and chief of the Buiucani and Bender (in the Moldovan-controlled area of Varnița) police inspectorate. From February 2016 to August 2017, he held the post of chief of police in Tighina. On 22 August 2017, he was appointed Councilor to the President of Moldova for special missions, serving alongside Vasile Şova.

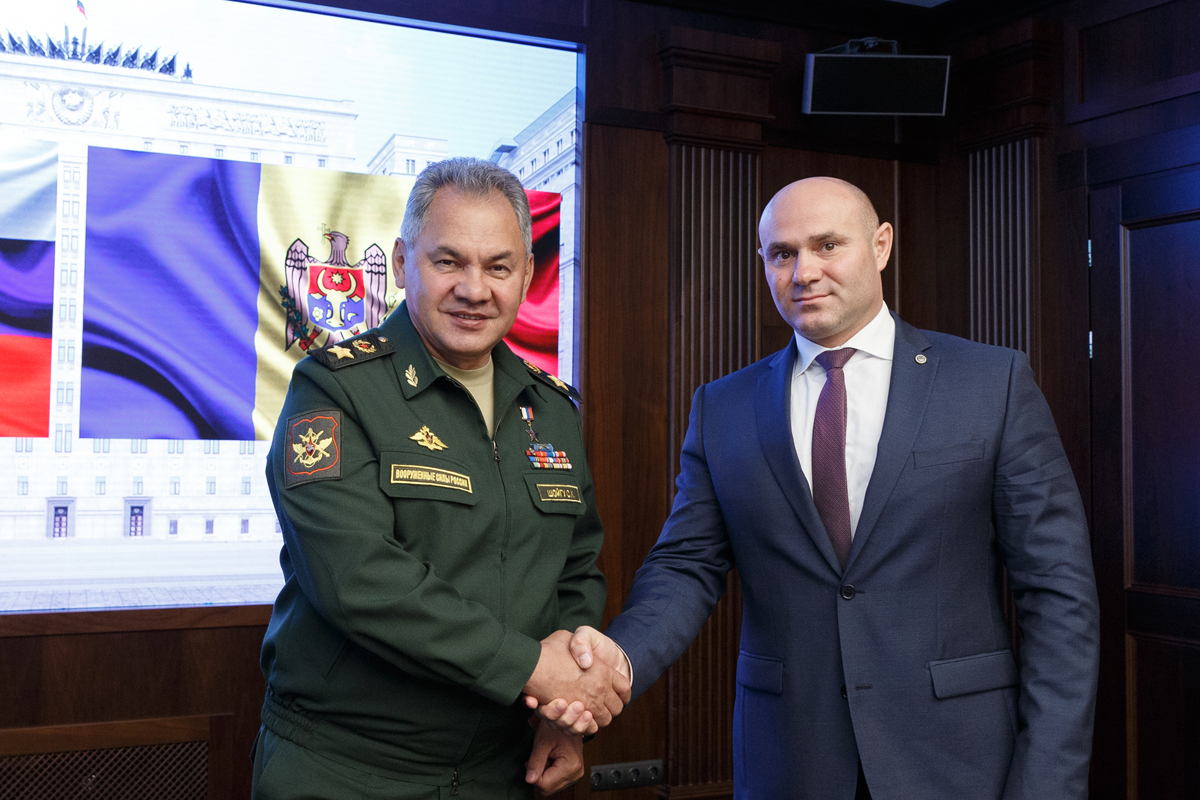
Voicu with Sergey Shoygu.

== Modern career ==
Pavel Voicu was appointed Minister of Defense by decree of President Dodon on 8 June 2019, officially joining the newly formed Sandu Cabinet. During Voicu's presentation ceremony, which included military honors from an honor guard, Dodon noted that he did not cooperate with former defense minister Eugen Sturza and that he has the conviction that under Voicu's leadership, the relationship between the two government institutions (the military and the presidency) will grow. Over the course of his leadership at the defence ministry, he only made two major visits to foreign countries, one to Moscow to meet with Russian defence minister Sergey Shoygu and the other to the United States accompanied by Ambassador Dereck J. Hogan to meet with Moldovan troops training with the North Carolina National Guard in Fort Irwin. On 2 May 2020, Voicu announced that he had tested positive for COVID-19. Pavel Voicu was not hospitalized, being self-isolated at home and later recovered on 20 May.

President Maia Sandu had accused the Interior Ministry and Voicu personally of following her family members as the campaign for the 2021 Moldovan parliamentary election began.

He is married with one child. He is fluent in French as well as Russian aside from the Romanian language.

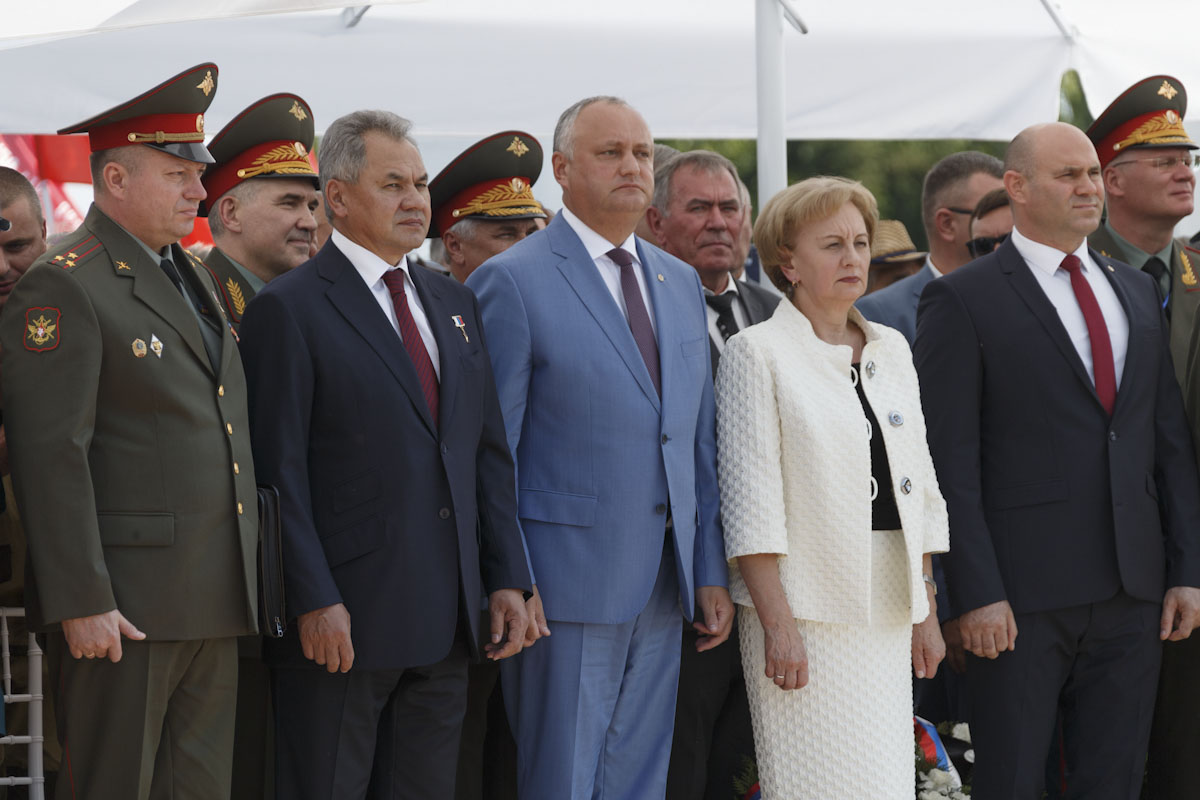
From left to right: Sergey Shoigu, Igor Dodon, Zinaida Greceanîi and Pavel Voicu in 2019, during the celebration of the Liberation Day
