= Eternity Memorial Complex, Chișinău =

Military memorial in Chișinău, Moldova

Eternity Memorial Complex
- Complexul Memorial „Eternitate”
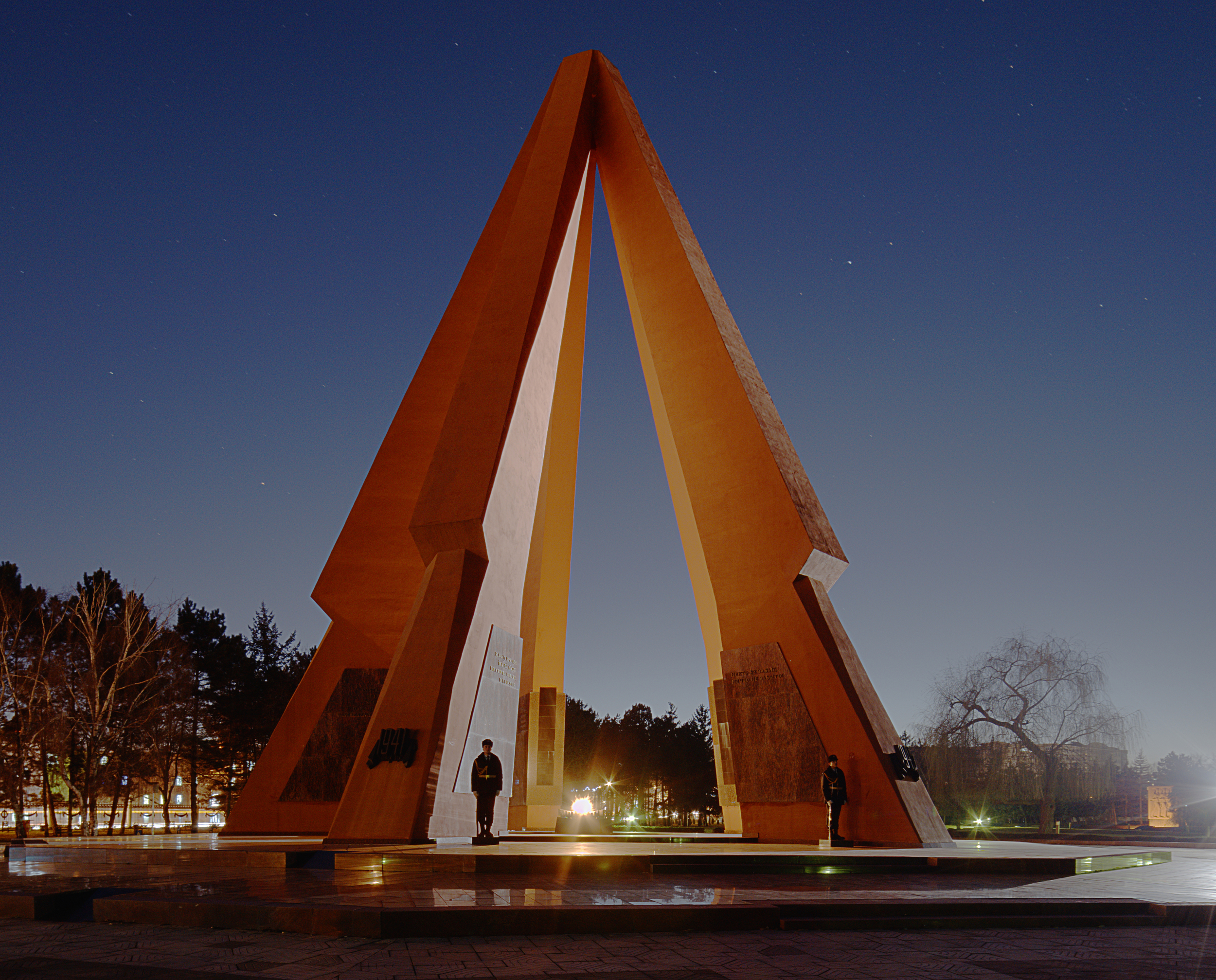
- The monument at night
- Interactive map of Eternity Memorial Complex
- Location: Chișinău, Moldova
- Coordinates: 47°00′33″N 28°49′58″E
- Created: May 9, 1975
- Status: All year

The Eternity Memorial Complex (Romanian: Complexul Memorial „Eternitate”) is a memorial located in Chișinău, the capital of Moldova. The memorial is located along P. Halippa Street (formerly Marshal Malinovsky Street). It is dedicated to Soviet soldiers who died in the Second Jassy–Kishinev Offensive.

== History ==
In Soviet times the complex was known as the Victory Memorial. The monument was made on 9 May 1975 in honour of the Soviet soldiers who died in the second Jassy–Kishinev offensive. The monument was restored on 24 August 2006, marking the 62nd anniversary of the offensive.

== Description ==
The central part of the memorial is a pyramid of five 25-meter tall stone rifles. A 5-pointed star with an eternal flame in the center of the monument. The monument is guarded by an honor guard from the Moldovan Army that changes guard hourly. Wreath-laying ceremonies are regularly held at the center of the memorial on national holidays. On 1 August 2016, the Central Bank of Russia issued a five-ruble coin from the series "Cities — capitals of states liberated by the Soviet troops from Nazi invaders", dedicated to Chișinău, the reverse of which depicts the memorial honoring the offensive. The number of copies is two million.

== Gallery ==
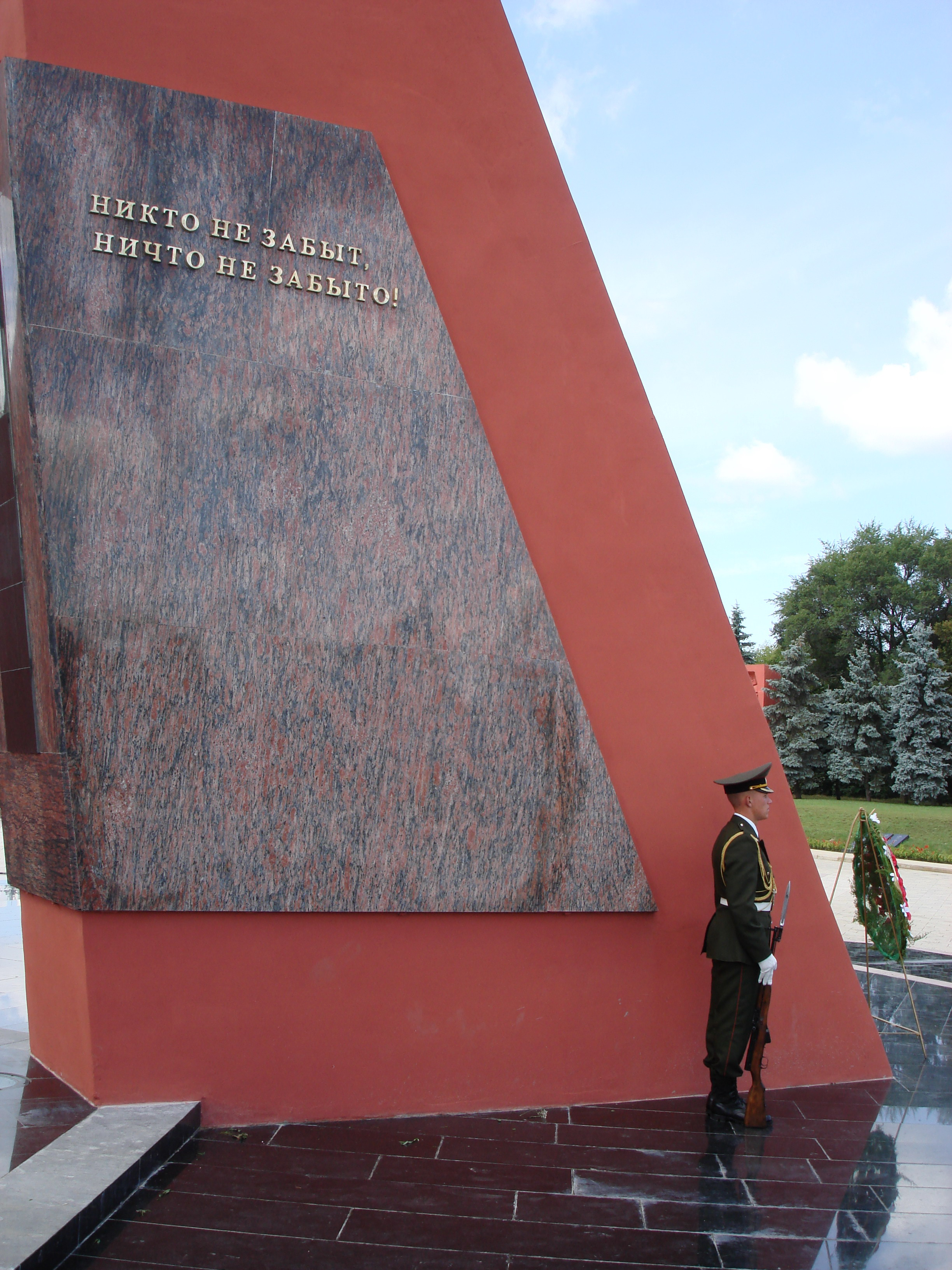
An army honor guard

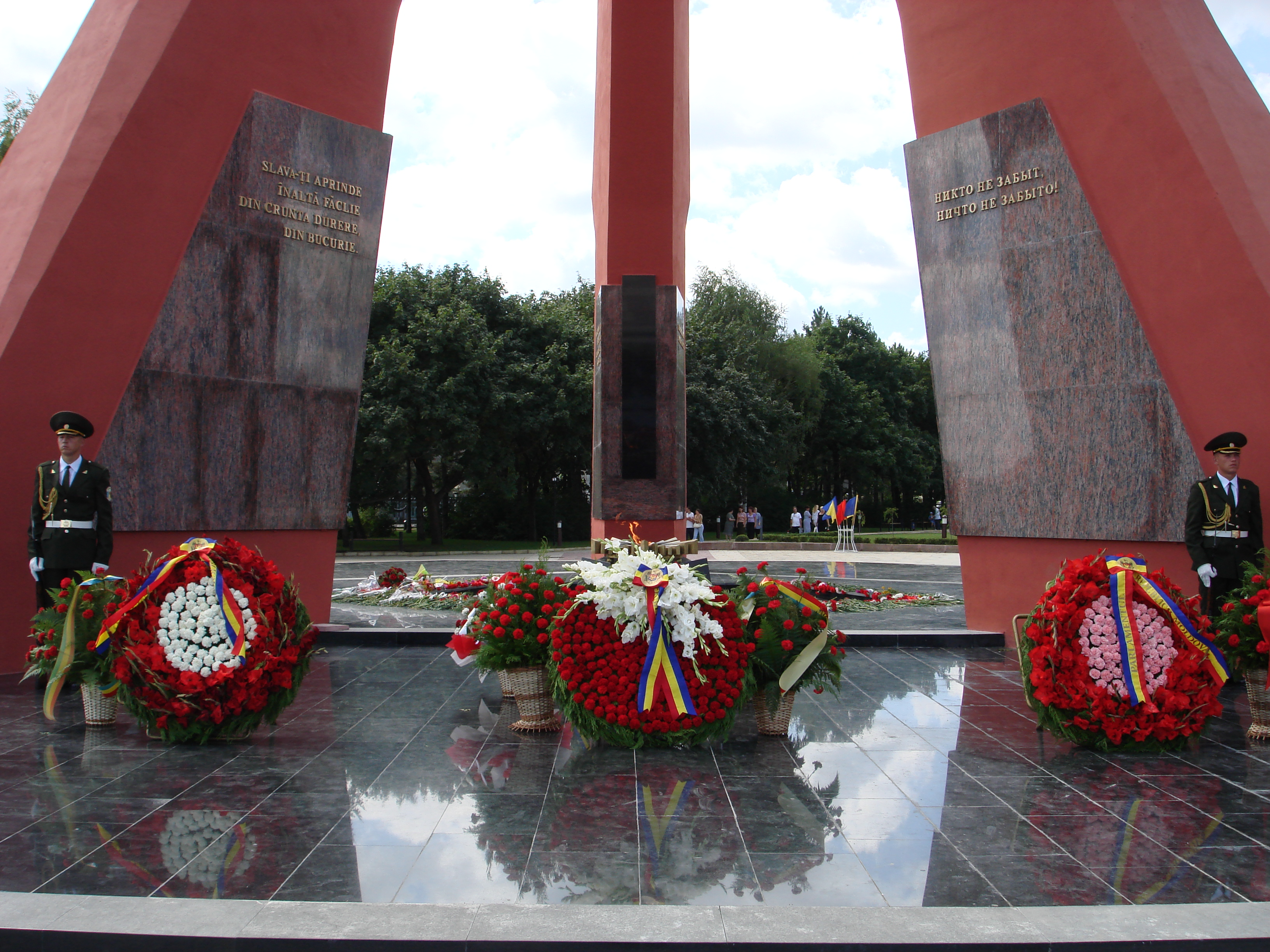
Government wreaths at the monument

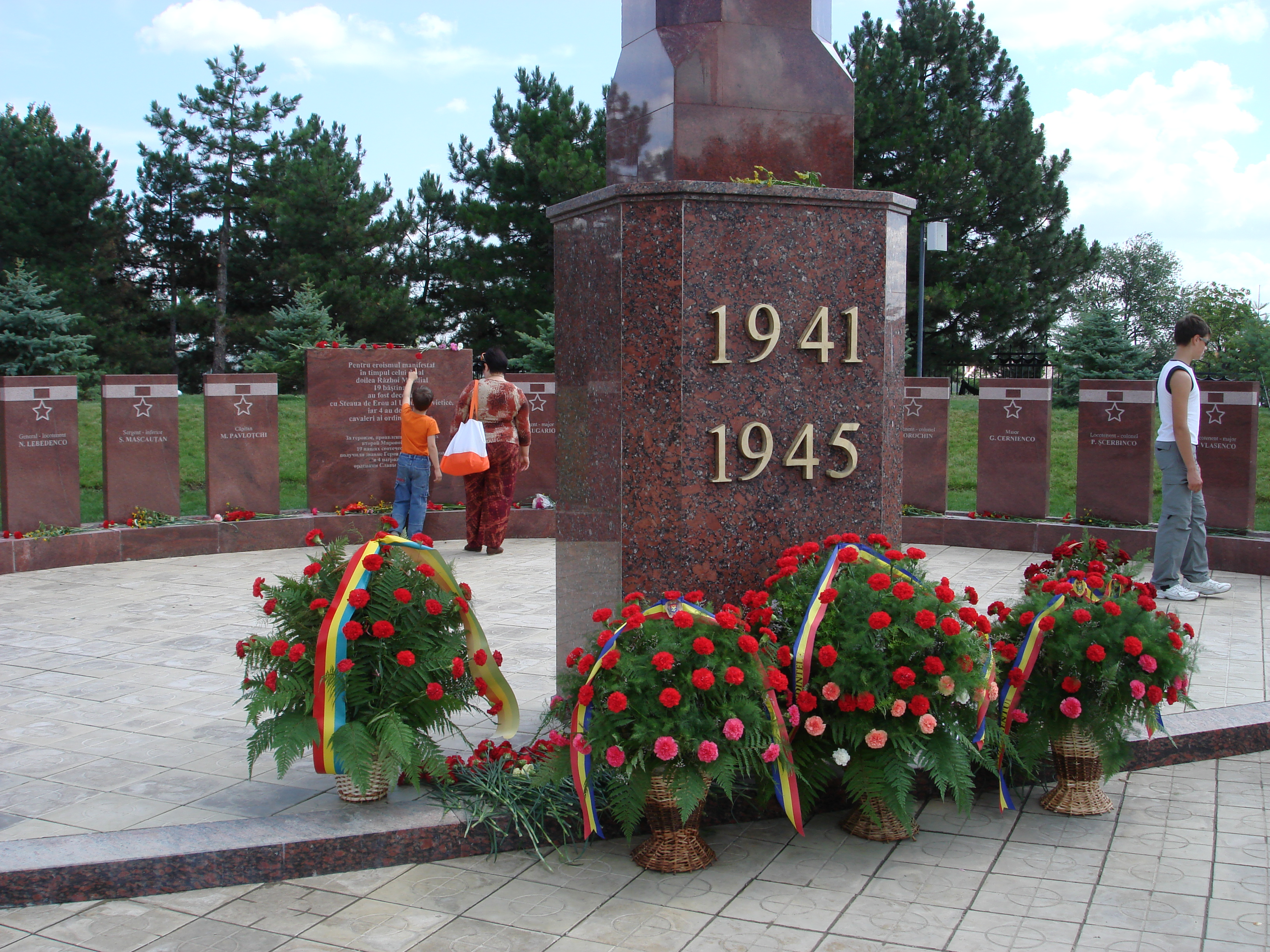

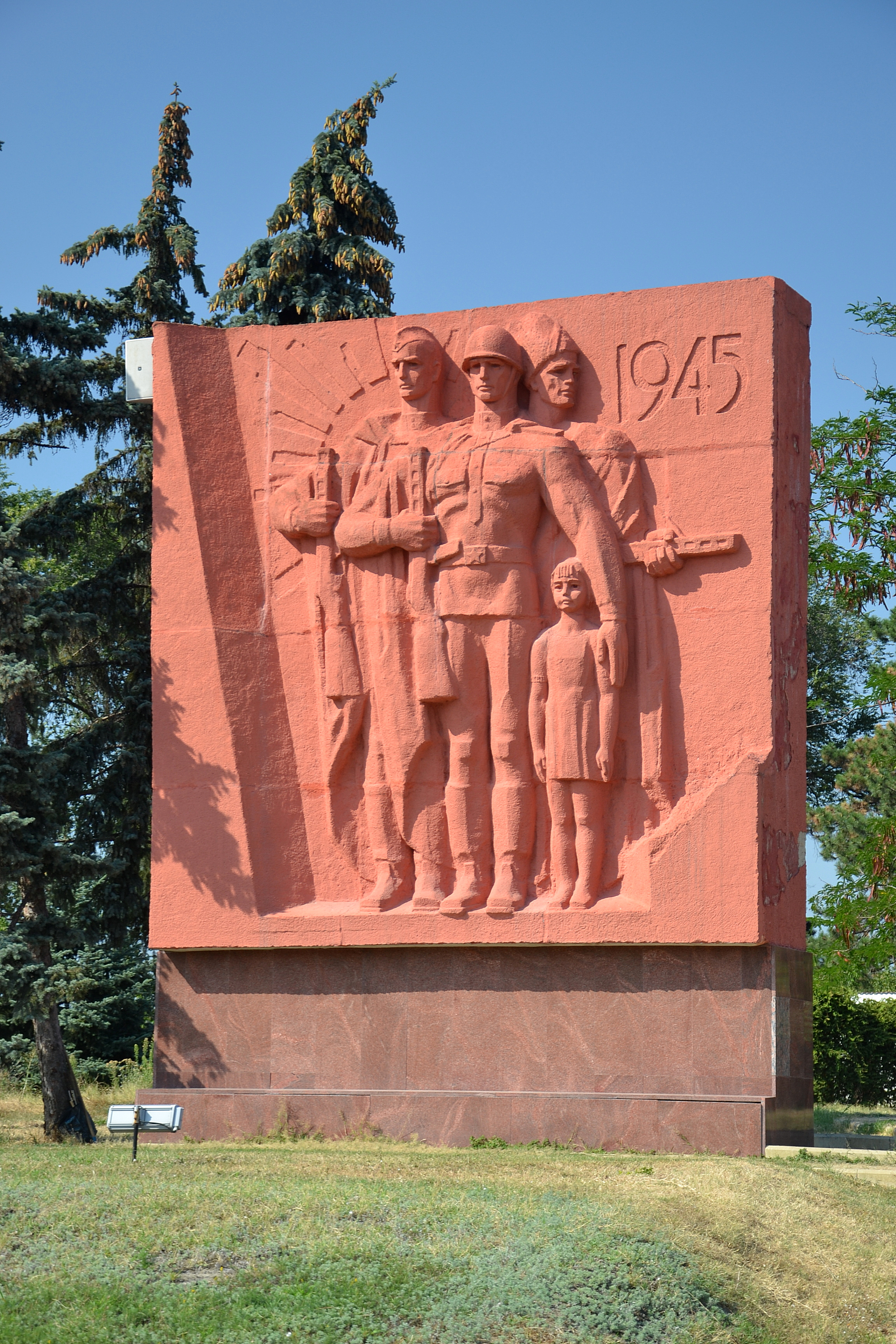

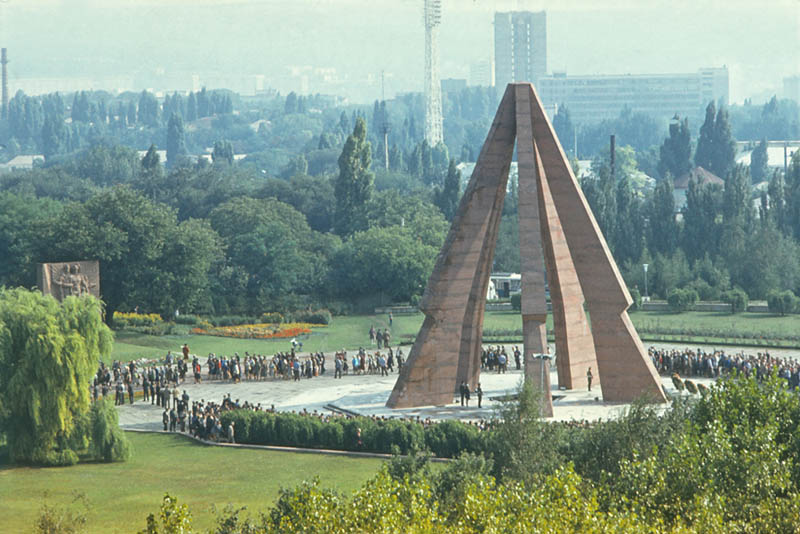

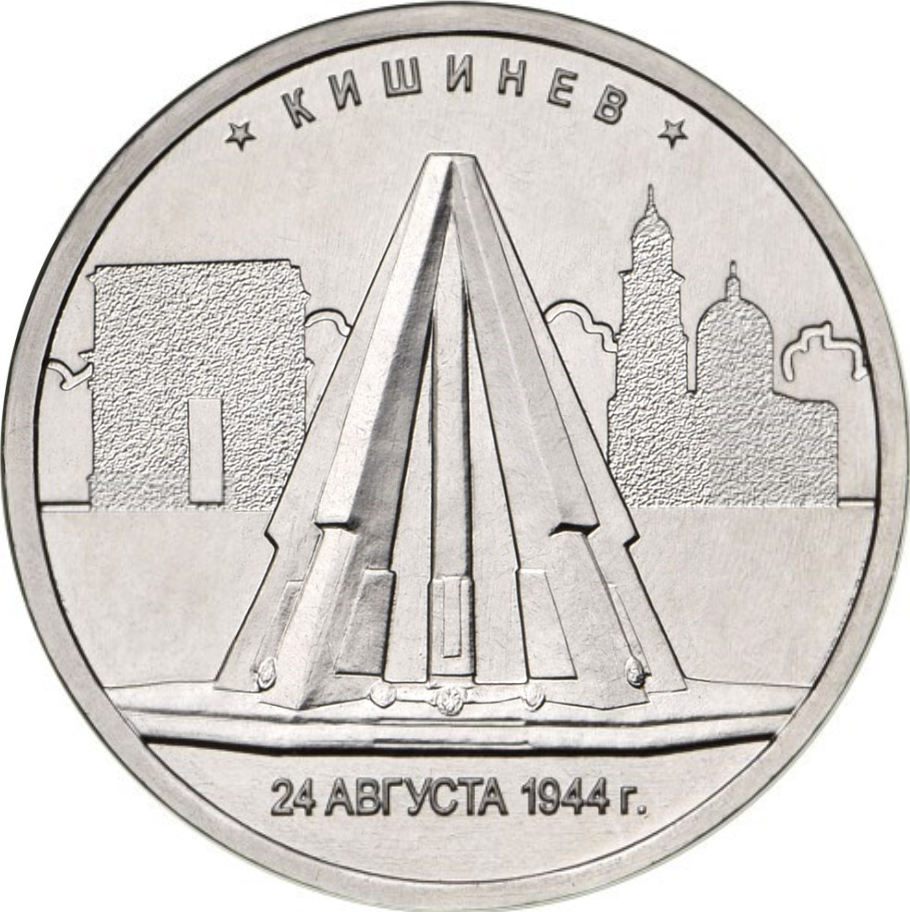
The memorial on a commemorative coin

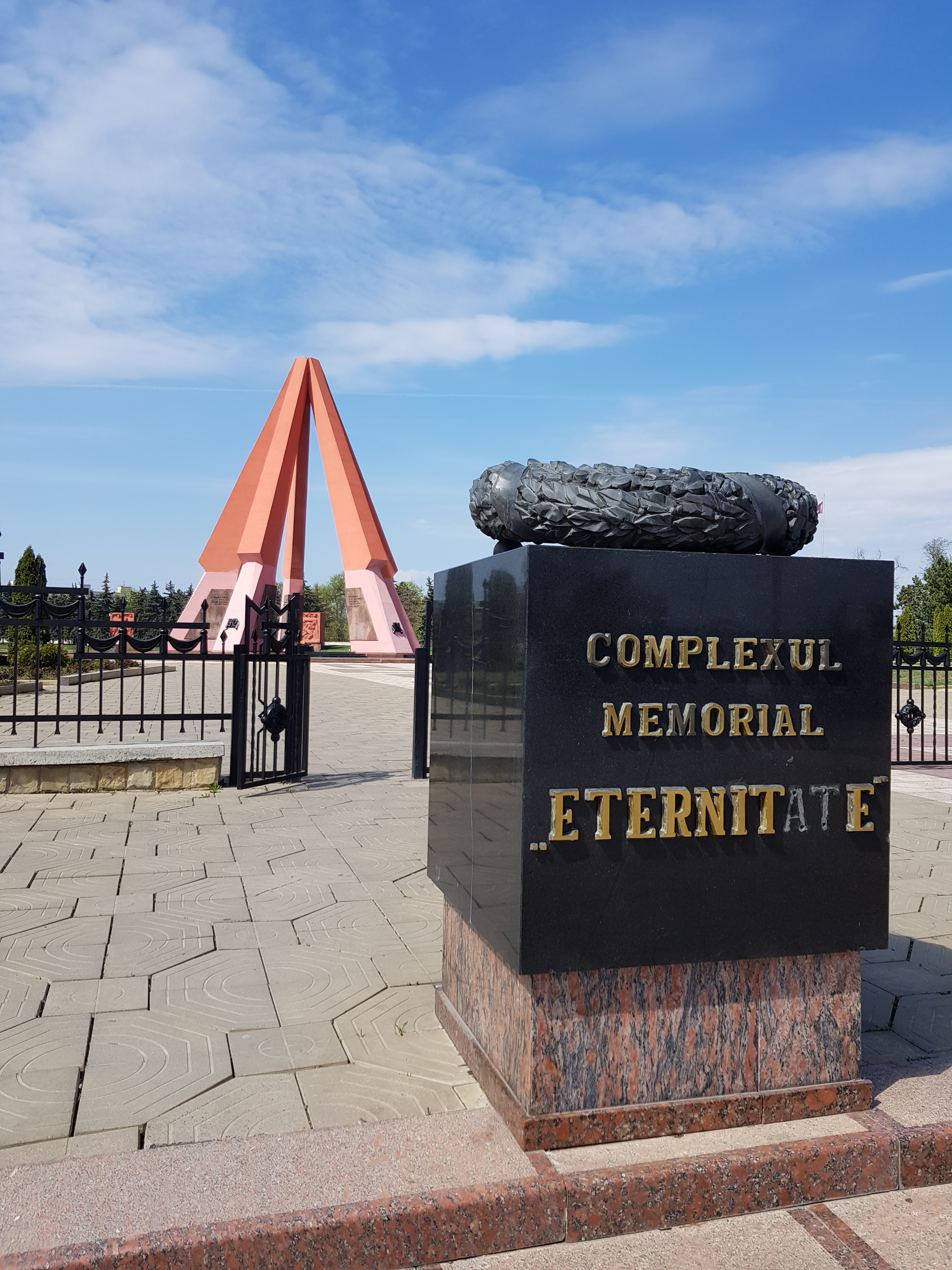
The memorial entrance

== See also ==
- Liberation Monument (Chișinău)
