= Măcărești, Ungheni =

Măcărești
- Commune
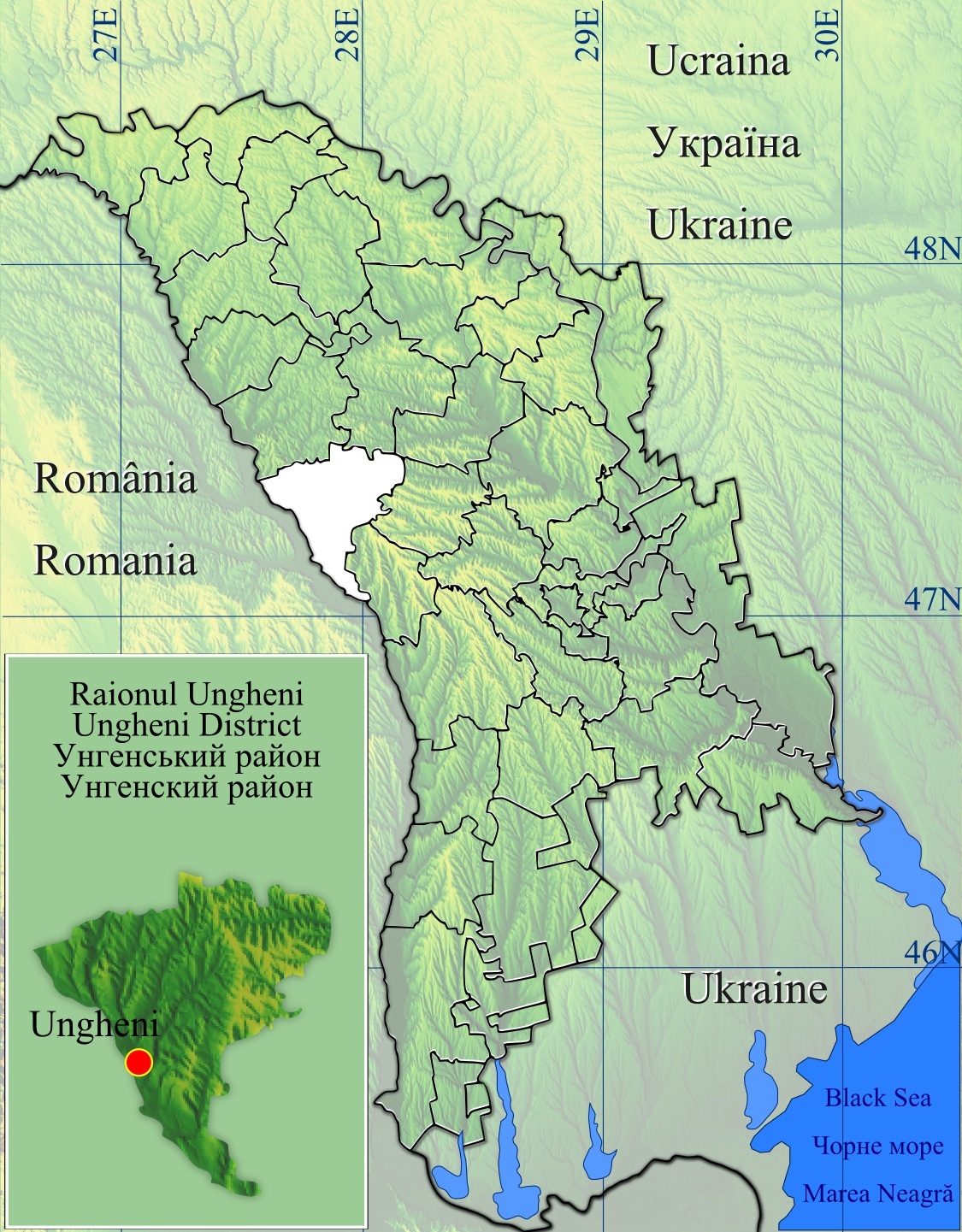
- Location within Ungheni
- Coordinates: 47°3′1″N 27°58′22″E
- Country: Moldova
- District: Ungheni District

Government
  - Mayor: Pintea Eacob, PDM 2011

Population (2014)
  - Total: 1,273
- Time zone: UTC+2 (EET)
  - Summer (DST): UTC+3 (EEST)
- Postal code: MD-3632

Măcărești is a commune in Ungheni District, Moldova. It is composed of two villages, Frăsinești and Măcărești.
