= Battle of Debrecen order of battle =

This order of battle lists the German, Hungarian, Romanian, and Soviet forces involved in the Battle of Debrecen in October 1944.

== Order of Battle for 6th Army, October 1944 ==
| Army Group | Army | Corps | Division | Remarks |
|---|---|---|---|---|
| South Gen Friessner | German; 6th Army; Gen Fretter-Pico | IV Panzer Corps; LtGen Kleeman | 24th Panzer Division | |
| South Gen Friessner | German; 6th Army; Gen Fretter-Pico | LXXII Army Corps; LtGen Schmidt | 76th Infantry Division | |
| South Gen Friessner | German; 6th Army; Gen Fretter-Pico | Hungarian; VII Army Corps; MajGen Vörös | Hungarian; 8th Reserve Division | |
| South Gen Friessner | German; 6th Army; Gen Fretter-Pico | Hungarian; VII Army Corps; MajGen Vörös | Hungarian; 12th Reserve Division | |
| South Gen Friessner | German; 6th Army; Gen Fretter-Pico | III Panzer Corps; LtGen Breith | 1st Panzer Division | |
| South Gen Friessner | German; 6th Army; Gen Fretter-Pico | III Panzer Corps; LtGen Breith | 13th Panzer Division | |
| South Gen Friessner | German; 6th Army; Gen Fretter-Pico | III Panzer Corps; LtGen Breith | 23rd Panzer Division | |
| South Gen Friessner | German; 6th Army; Gen Fretter-Pico | III Panzer Corps; LtGen Breith | Feldherrnhalle; Panzergrenadier Division | |
| South Gen Friessner | German; 6th Army; Gen Fretter-Pico | III Panzer Corps; LtGen Breith | 22nd SS Cavalry Division; Maria Theresa | |
| South Gen Friessner | German; 6th Army; Gen Fretter-Pico | III Panzer Corps; LtGen Breith | 46th Infantry Division | |
| South Gen Friessner | German; 6th Army; Gen Fretter-Pico | III Panzer Corps; LtGen Breith | 503rd Heavy Tank Battalion | |
| South Gen Friessner | Hungarian; Second Army; LtGen von Dalnoki (Attached to German; Sixth Army) | Hungarian; II Army Corps; MajGen Kiss | Hungarian; 2nd Armored Division | |
| South Gen Friessner | Hungarian; Second Army; LtGen von Dalnoki (Attached to German; Sixth Army) | Hungarian; II Army Corps; MajGen Kiss | Hungarian; 25th Infantry Division | |
| South Gen Friessner | Hungarian; Second Army; LtGen von Dalnoki (Attached to German; Sixth Army) | Hungarian; II Army Corps; MajGen Kiss | German; 15th Infantry Division | |
| South Gen Friessner | Hungarian; Second Army; LtGen von Dalnoki (Attached to German; Sixth Army) | Hungarian; Group Finta; BrigGen Finta | Hungarian; 7th Replacement Division | |
| South Gen Friessner | Hungarian; Second Army; LtGen von Dalnoki (Attached to German; Sixth Army) | Hungarian; Group Finta; BrigGen Finta | Hungarian; 1st Replacement; Mountain Brigade | |
| South Gen Friessner | Hungarian; Second Army; LtGen von Dalnoki (Attached to German; Sixth Army) | Hungarian; Group Finta; BrigGen Finta | Hungarian; 2nd Replacement; Mountain Brigade | |
| South Gen Friessner | Hungarian; Second Army; LtGen von Dalnoki (Attached to German; Sixth Army) | Army Reserve; LtGen von Dalnoki | Hungarian; 9th Replacement Division | |

== Order of Battle for Second Ukrainian Front, October 1944 ==
2nd Ukrainian Front (Marshal Rodion Malinovsky)

- 7th Guards Army (Lieutenant General Mikhail Shumilov)
  - 24th Guards Rifle Corps
    - 72nd Guards Rifle Division
    - 81st Guards Rifle Division
    - 6th Rifle Division
  - 25th Guards Rifle Corps
    - 6th Guards Airborne Division
    - 36th Guards Rifle Division
    - 53rd Rifle Division
  - Army Reserves
    - 227th Rifle Division
- 27th Army (Lieutenant General Sergei Trofimenko)
  - 35th Guards Rifle Corps
    - 3rd Guards Airborne Division
    - 93rd Rifle Division
    - 180th Rifle Division
    - 202nd Rifle Division
  - 33rd Rifle Corps
    - 78th Rifle Division
    - 337th Rifle Division
  - 104th Rifle Corps
    - 4th Guards Airborne Division
    - 163rd Rifle Division
    - 206th Rifle Division
  - Army Reserve
    - 11th Artillery Division
    - 27th Guards Tank Brigade
    - Romanian 2nd Mountain Division
    - Romanian 3rd Mountain Division
    - Romanian 18th Infantry Division
    - Romanian Tudor Vladimirescu Infantry Division
- 40th Army (Lieutenant General Filipp Zhmachenko)
  - 50th Rifle Corps
    - 240th Rifle Division
  - 51st Rifle Corps
    - 38th Rifle Division
    - 133rd Rifle Division
    - 232nd Rifle Division
  - Army Reserve
    - 42nd Guards Rifle Division
- 46th Army (Lieutenant General Ivan Shlemin)
  - 10th Guards Rifle Corps
    - 49th Guards Rifle Division
    - 59th Guards Rifle Division
    - 86th Guards Rifle Division
    - 109th Guards Rifle Division
  - 31st Guards Rifle Corps
    - 4th Guards Rifle Division
    - 34th Guards Rifle Division
    - 40th Guards Rifle Division
  - 37th Rifle Corps
    - 108th Guards Rifle Division
    - 320th Rifle Division
  - Army Reserve
    - 7th Breakthrough Artillery Division
- 53rd Army (Lieutenant General Ivan Managarov)
  - 27th Guards Rifle Corps
    - 297th Rifle Division
    - 409th Rifle Division
  - 49th Rifle Corps
    - 1st Guards Airborne Division
    - 110th Guards Rifle Division
    - 375th Rifle Division
  - 57th Rifle Corps (Major General Fyodor Ostashenko)
    - 203rd Rifle Division
    - 228th Rifle Division (Colonel Ivan Yesin)
    - 243rd Rifle Division
  - Army Reserve
    - 18th Tank Corps
    - 5th Guards Breakthrough Artillery Division
- 6th Guards Tank Army (Major General Andrei Grigoryevich Kravchenko)
  - 9th Guards Mechanized Corps
  - 5th Guards Tank Corps
  - 6th Self-Propelled Artillery Brigade
  - Romanian Cavalry Corps
    - 1st Cavalry Training Division
    - 1st Infantry Training Division
- Cavalry – Mechanized Group Pliyev (Major General Issa Pliyev)
  - 4th Guards Cavalry Corps
    - 9th Guards Cavalry Division
    - 10th Guards Cavalry Division
    - 30th Cavalry Division
  - 6th Guards Cavalry Corps
    - 8th Guards Cavalry Division
    - 13th Guards Cavalry Division
    - 8th Cavalry Division
  - 7th Mechanized Corps
- Cavalry – Mechanized Group Gorshkov (Major General Sergey Gorshkov)
  - 5th Guards Cavalry Corps
    - 11th Guards Cavalry Division
    - 12th Guards Cavalry Division
    - 63rd Cavalry Division
  - 23rd Tank Corps
- Romanian First Army (General Nicolae Macici)
  - IV Corps
    - 2nd Infantry Division
    - 4th Infantry Division
  - VII Corps
    - 9th Cavalry Division
    - 19th Infantry Division
- Romanian Fourth Army (General Gheorghe Avramescu)
  - Mountain Corps
    - 1st Mountain Division
    - 3rd Infantry Division
    - 6th Infantry Division
  - II Corps
    - 8th Cavalry Division
  - 20th Infantry Division
  - VI Corps
    - 7th Infantry Division
    - 9th Infantry Division
    - 21st Infantry Division
  - Army Reserve
    - 1st Cavalry Division
  - 11th Infantry Division
  - Armored Group (Remnants of 1st Armored Division)
- Front Reserve
  - 2nd Guards Mechanized Corps
  - 25th Guards Rifle Division
  - 303rd Rifle Division
