= 228th Rifle Division =

228th Rifle Division (March 14, 1941 - December 27, 1941) 228th Rifle Division (December 1941 - September 1, 1942) 228th Rifle Division (June 25, 1943 - July 1945)
- Active: 1941–1945
- Country: Soviet Union
- Branch: Red Army
- Type: Infantry
- Size: Division
- Engagements: Operation Barbarossa; Battle of Brody (1941); Battle of Kiev (1941); Case Blue; Donbas strategic offensive (August 1943); Battle of the Dniepr; Nikopol–Krivoi Rog offensive Uman–Botoșani offensive First Jassy–Kishinev offensive Second Jassy–Kishinev offensive Budapest offensive Siege of Budapest; Bratislava–Brno offensive Prague offensive
- Decorations: Order of Suvorov (3rd formation)
- Battle honours: Voznesensk (3rd formation)

Commanders
- Notable commanders: Col. Aleksandr Mikhailovich Ilyin; Col. Viktor Georgievich Chernov; Col. Nikolai Ivanovich Dementev; Col. Pavel Grigorevich Kulikov; Maj. Gen. Ivan Yesin

The 228th Rifle Division was an infantry division of the Red Army, originally formed in the months just before the start of the German invasion, based on the shtat (table of organization and equipment) of September 13, 1939. After being formed in the Kiev Special Military District it soon took part in the fighting in northern Ukraine where it joined the 5th Army north of Kyiv. The presence of this Army in the fastnesses of the eastern Pripyat area influenced German strategy as it appeared to threaten both the left flank of Army Group South and the right flank of Army Group Center. In September the latter Group was turned south to encircle the Soviet forces defending Kyiv and in the process the 228th was cut off and destroyed.

A new 228th formed in the Siberian Military District in December 1941 based on the 451st Rifle Division. It was soon assigned to 24th Army in Southern Front which was intended as a backstop to the front line armies facing the German summer offensive of 1942, but it was driven back, encircled and destroyed in a matter of weeks.

The third 228th, based on the shtat of December 10, 1942, was created in June 1943 from the cadre of a rifle brigade. It took part in the liberation of eastern Ukraine as part of 1st Guards Army before being moved to 37th Army of 2nd Ukrainian Front during the fighting along the Dniepr. During the advance into western Ukraine in the spring of 1944 it won a battle honor but this advance was halted in April after the German defense crystallised along the west bank of the Dniestr River near Bender. During the next few months the 228th moved to the northwest as a reserve unit but was assigned to 53rd Army shortly after the start of the offensive that drove Romania out of the Axis in August. As part of this Army it advanced into Hungary and Czechoslovakia and would be decorated for its part in the liberation of Brno. It was disbanded in July 1945.

== 1st Formation ==
The division began forming on March 14, 1941, at Zhytomyr in the Kiev Special Military District. When completed it had the following order of battle:

- 767th Rifle Regiment
- 795th Rifle Regiment
- 799th Rifle Regiment
- 669th Light Artillery Regiment
- 366th Howitzer Artillery Regiment
- 10th Antitank Battalion
- 9th Antiaircraft Battalion
- 304th Reconnaissance Battalion
- 383rd Sapper Battalion
- 605th Signal Battalion
- 378th Medical/Sanitation Battalion
- 324th Chemical Defense (Anti-gas) Platoon
- 701st Motor Transport Battalion
- 485th Field Bakery
- 659th Field Postal Station
- 531st Field Office of the State Bank

Col. Aleksandr Mikhailovich Ilyin was appointed to command on the day the division began forming. On June 22 it was in the 36th Rifle Corps in the reserves of Southwestern Front, and was located at Shepetivka. By the first of July it had left 36th Corps and had been assigned to 5th Army under direct Army command. At this time it was positioned south of Hoshcha fighting against the advancing 13th and 14th Panzer Divisions of III Motorized Corps in cooperation with 19th Mechanized Corps. As the panzers pushed toward Kyiv on July 7 the 228th attempted to hold at Novohrad-Volynskyi but was soon forced to fall back to the southeast. By July 10 it had been returned to 36th Corps which was now in 6th Army of the same Front, but later in the month the division was again assigned to 5th Army. By July 23 it was fighting southwest of Malyn and as of August 11 it was located east of that city near the confluence of the Teteriv and Irsha Rivers. On August 1 Colonel Ilyin was removed from command and replaced by Col. Viktor Georgievich Chernov. Ilyin would take command of the 215th Motorized Division in mid-September and escaped the Kyiv encirclement to later lead the 261st Rifle Division and the 61st Rifle Corps before being killed in action in May 1944. Chernov had previously served as deputy commanding officer of the 62nd Rifle Division.

=== Battle of Kiev ===
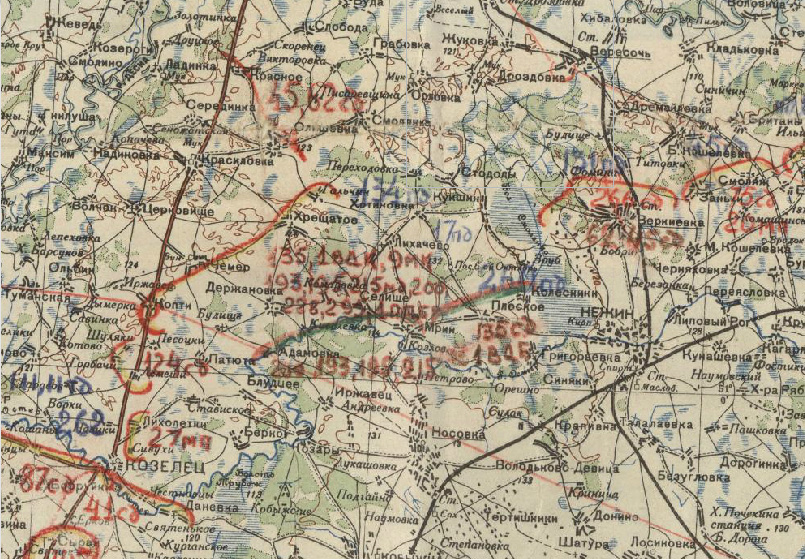
Positions of Soviet forces northeast of Kozelets on September 12, 1941. The 228th is shown.

The presence of 5th Army in the area north of Kyiv had been affecting German strategy for some time as noted in Führer directive No. 33 of July 19:

The Kiev fortifications and the Soviet 5th Army's operations on our rear have inhibited active operations and free maneuver on Army Group South's northern flank.

The directive set the task, among others, "to destroy the Soviet 5th Army by means of a closely coordinated offensive by the forces on Army Group Center's southern flank and Army Group South's northern flank."

By August 14 strength returns showed that there were only 2,429 personnel remaining in the 228th, and 11 days later, on August 25 the number had decreased to under 2,000. By the end of the month the 669th Light Artillery Regiment had been detached to 26th Army as a support unit while the remainder of the division was transferred to 37th Army.

Meanwhile, the 2nd Panzer Group and 2nd Army of Army Group Center began their drives southward. At this time the remnants of the division were attempting to hold positions west of Chernihiv from elements of the XXIII Army Corps outflanking it to the east. By September 10 the remnants of 5th and 37th Armies were grouped north of Kozelets but on September 16 the 2nd Panzers linked up with the 1st Panzer Group of Army Group South well to the east and the Army was deeply encircled. While the division was noted as effectively destroyed by October 1, it was not officially removed from the Red Army order of battle until December 27. Colonel Chernov took command of 47th Mountain Rifle Division on October 2 and would go on to lead the 90th Guards and 60th Rifle Divisions and be promoted to the rank of major general before being killed in action on March 17, 1945. On April 6 he was posthumously made a Hero of the Soviet Union.

== 2nd Formation ==
The 451st Rifle Division began forming at Kansk in the Siberian Military District in November 1941. Later that month it was redesignated as the 2nd formation of the 228th. Its order of battle was similar to that of the 1st formation:

- 767th Rifle Regiment
- 795th Rifle Regiment
- 799th Rifle Regiment
- 669th Artillery Regiment
- 10th Antitank Battalion
- 129th Antiaircraft Battery
- 120th Mortar Battalion
- 236th Reconnaissance Company
- 383rd Sapper Battalion
- 605th Signal Battalion
- 378th Medical/Sanitation Battalion
- 522nd Chemical Defense (Anti-gas) Company
- 585th Motor Transport Company
- 438th Field Bakery
- 903rd Divisional Veterinary Hospital
- 1698th Field Postal Station
- 1068th Field Office of the State Bank

Col. Nikolai Ivanovich Dementev took command on February 18, 1942, and would lead the division until it was disbanded. It arrived at the active front on April 28 where it was placed at the disposal of Southern Front.

=== Operation Blue ===
When 1st Panzer and 17th Army launched the German summer offensive on their sectors on July 7, the 228th was still in Southern Front, but now in 24th Army. This newly formed Army, with just four rifle divisions, two of which (335th and 341st) had been badly damaged in the Second Battle of Kharkov, was attempting to provide a second echelon for the Front behind the 12th and 18th Armies. On July 10 the Front was ordered to form those divisions into a task force along with a special tank group to move northeastward to block the XXXX Panzer Corps in the Chertkovo area. This move availed very little, and the Southern Front commander, Lt. Gen. R. Ya. Malinovsky, soon reported that 24th Army was being driven back to the Millerovo–Rogalik–Vishniaki line "under great pressure." By dawn on July 15 the 3rd Panzer Division of 4th Panzer Army had linked up with 14th Panzer of 1st Panzer Army 40 km south of Millerovo. By this time the 228th had been reduced to under 2,500 personnel and although the encirclement was never really closed too few of these men managed to escape for the division to be rebuilt. By the beginning of August the 24th Army had been effectively disbanded and the 228th was no longer in the Red Army order of battle as of July 29 although its headquarters was not officially disbanded until September 1. Colonel Dementev escaped the debacle and on September 6 took over command of the 337th Rifle Division. He was promoted to the rank of major general in January 1943 before being wounded in February and hospitalized for several months; he did not see any further front line service.

== 3rd Formation ==
Another new 228th was formed on June 25, 1943, in 6th Army of Southwestern Front, based on the 106th Rifle Brigade.

=== 106th Rifle Brigade ===
This brigade had formed from December 1941 until April 1942 in the Moscow Military District. By May 1 it was considered ready for front line service and first went to the Reserve of the Supreme High Command before being assigned to 61st Army in Western Front by month's end. It consisted of:

- 4 rifle battalions
- 1 artillery battalion (12 76mm cannon)
- 1 mortar battalion (82mm mortars)
- 1 antitank rifle company (48 antitank rifles)
- 1 submachine gun company
- 1 reconnaissance company
- 1 sapper company

In June it was moved to the reserves of Bryansk Front and in July joined Operational Group Chibisov on the southern flank of the Front, fighting in direct support of 16th Tank Corps. The 106th took heavy losses during the early stages of Case Blue and returned to the Reserve of the Supreme High Command and then Moscow Military District in September for rebuilding. Late in October it returned to the front as part of 13th Army in Bryansk Front. Near the end of the year it was moved to 6th Army in Southwestern Front but after advancing in the wake of the German defeat at Stalingrad it was caught up in the German counteroffensive at Kharkiv. Once the front stabilized in March the brigade was assigned to the 4th Guards Rifle Corps of 6th Army and was again rebuilt, at least in terms of infantry, but remained short of heavy weapons until it was converted to the new 228th.

Once formed the division's order of battle was again very similar to that of the first two formations:

- 767th Rifle Regiment
- 795th Rifle Regiment
- 799th Rifle Regiment
- 669th Artillery Regiment
- 10th Antitank Battalion
- 236th Reconnaissance Company
- 383rd Sapper Battalion
- 605th Signal Battalion (later 1457th Signal Company)
- 378th Medical/Sanitation Battalion
- 522nd Chemical Defense (Anti-gas) Company
- 585th Motor Transport Company
- 562nd Field Bakery
- 908th Divisional Veterinary Hospital (later 903rd)
- 1751st Field Postal Station
- 1831st Field Office of the State Bank

Col. Pavel Grigorevich Kulikov took command on June 29. The new division remained in 4th Guards Corps for several weeks but by the beginning of August it had come under direct Army command.

== Into Ukraine ==
In July the 6th Army was near the right flank of Southwestern Front, along the Donets River southeast of Kharkiv, but was not directly involved in the first Donbas strategic offensive. The Front launched a new effort in the Donbas on August 13 in cooperation with the Soviet forces attacking toward Kharkiv from the north in Operation Polkovodets Rumyantsev. At about this time the 228th was transferred to 34th Rifle Corps of 1st Guards Army, just to the south. The defending German 6th Army and 1st Panzer Army resisted as best they could but on August 31, under immense pressure, were authorized to withdraw to the line of the Kalmius River. The retreat did not end there and through September and into October the 228th remained in 34th Corps of 1st Guards Army advancing toward Dnepropetrovsk.

Later in October, after the Dniepr had been crossed in several places, the division was shifted again, now to 68th Rifle Corps in 37th Army of 2nd Ukrainian Front, although in November it would come under direct Army command. This Front was under command of Army Gen. I. S. Konev and on October 15 he launched an offensive with elements of four armies, including the 37th, from a bridgehead roughly halfway between Dnepropetrovsk and Kremenchuk in the direction of Kryvyi Rih. Piatykhatky was liberated on October 18 and by the 25th the advance had reached the outskirts of Kryvyi Rih. A counterattack by XXXX Panzer Corps from October 27–30 drove Konev's forces back up to 30 km and badly damaged nine rifle divisions.

=== Nikopol-Krivoi Rog Offensive ===
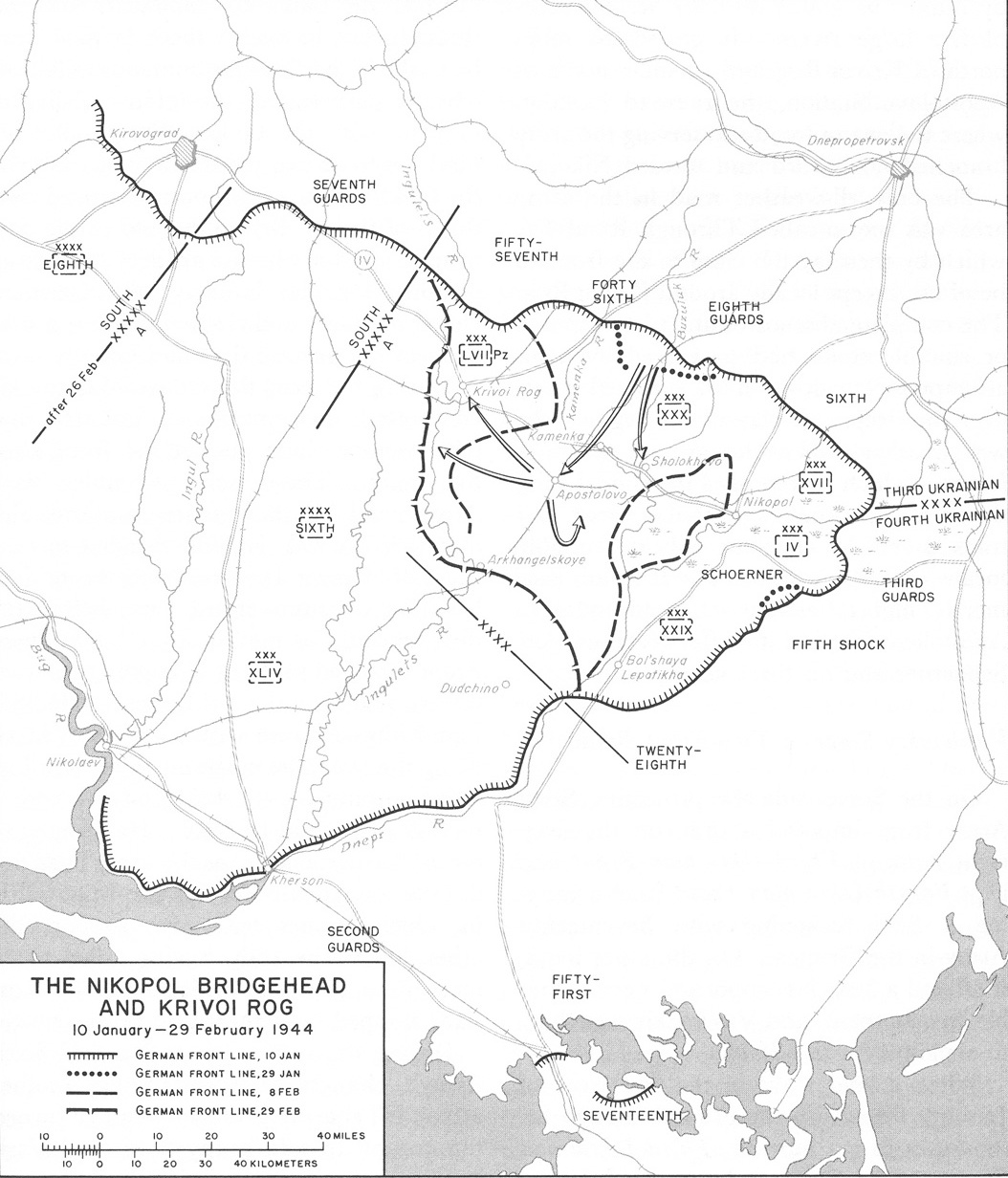
Nikopol-Krivoi Rog Offensive

During December the 228th became part of 57th Rifle Corps, still in 37th Army. In January 1944 the Army came under command of 3rd Ukrainian Front. The Front's first effort to renew the drive on Kryvyi Rih began on January 10, led mainly by 46th Army, but made only modest gains at considerable cost and was halted on the 16th. The offensive was renewed on January 30 after a powerful artillery preparation against the positions of the German XXX Army Corps on the same sector of the line, but this was met with a counter-barrage that disrupted the attack. A new effort the next day, backed by even heavier artillery and air support, made progress but still did not penetrate the German line.

On February 1 the XXX Corps line was pierced in several places and by nightfall the Soviet forces had torn a 9 km-wide gap in the line west of the Bazavluk River. During the next two days German 6th Army tried to avoid encirclement by slogging through the mud to the Kamianka River line, which was already compromised by the Soviet advance. Forward detachments of 8th Guards Army reached Apostolove on the 4th and over the next few days 46th Army began to attempt a sweep westward to envelop Kryvyi Rih from the south. The dispersion of the Front's forces, combined with German reserves produced by the evacuation of the Nikopol bridgehead east of the Dniepr and indecision on the part of the German high command, produced "a peculiar sort of semiparalysis" on this part of the front during the second half of the month. Finally, on February 21 elements of the 46th and 37th Armies broke into the outer defenses of Kryvyi Rih. To avoid costly street fighting 6th Army was withdrawn west of the city, which was liberated the next day.

=== First Jassy–Kishinev Offensive ===
The Uman–Botoșani Offensive began on March 5 and as 37th Army advanced toward the Dniestr River the division was one of only two units granted a battle honor for the liberation of Voznesensk on March 24. Three days later Colonel Kulikov left the division and was replaced by Col. Ivan Yesin. This officer had previously commanded the 38th and 88th Guards Rifle Divisions and had been serving as deputy commander of 35th Guards Rifle Division. He would be promoted to the rank of major general on November 2 and would lead the 228th for the duration of the war.

As 37th Army closed on the Dniestr the 57th Rifle Corps was commanded by Maj. Gen. F. A. Ostashenko and consisted of the 58th and 92nd Guards and the 228th Rifle Divisions. Early on April 11 the bulk of 3rd Ukrainian Front's forces began pursuing disorganized German forces toward the river with 37th Army advancing toward Tiraspol. The Army's assignment was to force the Dniestr from north of Parcani to as far south as Slobozia, seize a bridgehead roughly 25 km wide and 12 km deep, and to prepare for a further pursuit in the direction of Chișinău. Much of this area consisted of a large, irregular bend of lowlands that were nearly indefensible, but retaining possession depended on capturing high ground to the west that dominated the lower terrain.

The Army advanced with 57th Corps on the right (north) wing, 82nd Rifle Corps on the left, and 6th Guards Rifle Corps in second echelon but mostly following the 82nd. The 57th proceeded through Blijnii Hutor toward Parcani with the mission of capturing Tiraspol with an assault from the north, then crossing the river at Parcani before taking the town of Bender (Tighina) on the west bank and its adjacent strip of high ground. General Ostashenko deployed the 228th in the center with 58th Guards to the north and 92nd Guards to the south; the 188th Rifle Division of 82nd Corps supported the flank of the 92nd. The 58th Guards and the 228th cleared Tiraspol overnight on April 11/12 before pushing on to the river south of Parcani. The 92nd Guards also reached the east bank north of the town but ran into effective resistance from the 257th Infantry Division which prevented any crossings. The 58th Guards managed to secure a small bridgehead near Varnița while the 228th was able to get over near Tîrnauca. Colonel Yesin was fortunate to escape the fate of his fellow division commanders, both of whom were wounded in the day's fighting and required evacuation. The 6th Guards Corps had more success in its crossing operations but German reinforcements were already reaching the high ground.

Late on April 12 the Front commander, Army Gen. Malinovsky, ordered the Army to "capture the fortress of Bendery by day's end on 14 April". 57th Corps was to capture Novye Lipkani (a suburb of Bender) to the south of the town and Varnița to the north as part of an encircling move but the artillery preparation, which began at 0700 hours on April 13, proved utterly ineffective and this effort ended in total failure. Fighting continued over the following days and by April 17 the Army's bridgehead south of Tiraspol was roughly 15 km wide and 15 km deep, but Bender was still in German hands, as was the high ground where they had managed to establish continuous defenses. Overnight on April 18/19 the 57th and 82nd Corps, reinforced by the 15th Guards Rifle Division, were to make a second effort to seize German positions near Bender, led by the 58th Guards and the 228th. In the event the offensive was postponed until April 20 and in heavy fighting over the next five days the Army made no progress whatsoever. Operations on this sector were effectively shut down until August.

== Into the Balkans ==
In June the 57th Corps was moved to the reserves of 2nd Ukrainian Front and remained there through July. At the start of the Second Jassy-Kishinev Offensive the Corps (now containing the 228th, 203rd and 243rd Rifle Divisions) was still in reserve on the right flank of the Front backing the 52nd and 27th Armies, which formed the Front's shock group. The Corps was to be ready to operate in the zone of either of these as needed. When the offensive began on August 20 the 57th Corps was initially involved in the artillery preparation only. During the first three days the shock group completed the breakthrough of the Axis front and the Front reserves (53rd Army, 57th and 27th Guards Rifle Corps) were ordered to move to the area south of the Podu Iloaiei–Iași road during the night of August 22/23. Over the remainder of the operation the Corps advanced southward to cut off and reduce the retreating German and Romanian forces. By the beginning of September the Corps had been officially assigned to 53rd Army, and the 228th would remain in this Army until after the German surrender.

=== Hungarian Campaign ===
Following its advance through Romania, on October 28 the left flank forces of 2nd Ukrainian Front, including 53rd Army, began an operation to defeat the German-Hungarian forces in and around Budapest. The main drive was carried out by 7th Guards and 46th Armies while the 53rd provided flank security. On October 29 the Army advanced up to 13 km and reached the outskirts of Polgár. By the morning of November 4 the 27th Army relieved the 53rd along the front from Polgár to Tiszafüred while it regrouped to force the Tisza River three days later. On November 11 the Army's right flank corps began fighting for the southern outskirts of Füzesabony; the town did not finally fall until the 15th after which the Army commander, Lt. Gen. I. M. Managarov, was ordered to develop the offensive in the direction of Verpelét. By November 20 the 53rd reached the southeastern slopes of the Mátra Mountains between Gyöngyös and Eger where the Axis forces were able to organize a powerful defense which brought the advance to a halt until November 26.

=== Advance into Slovakia and Postwar ===
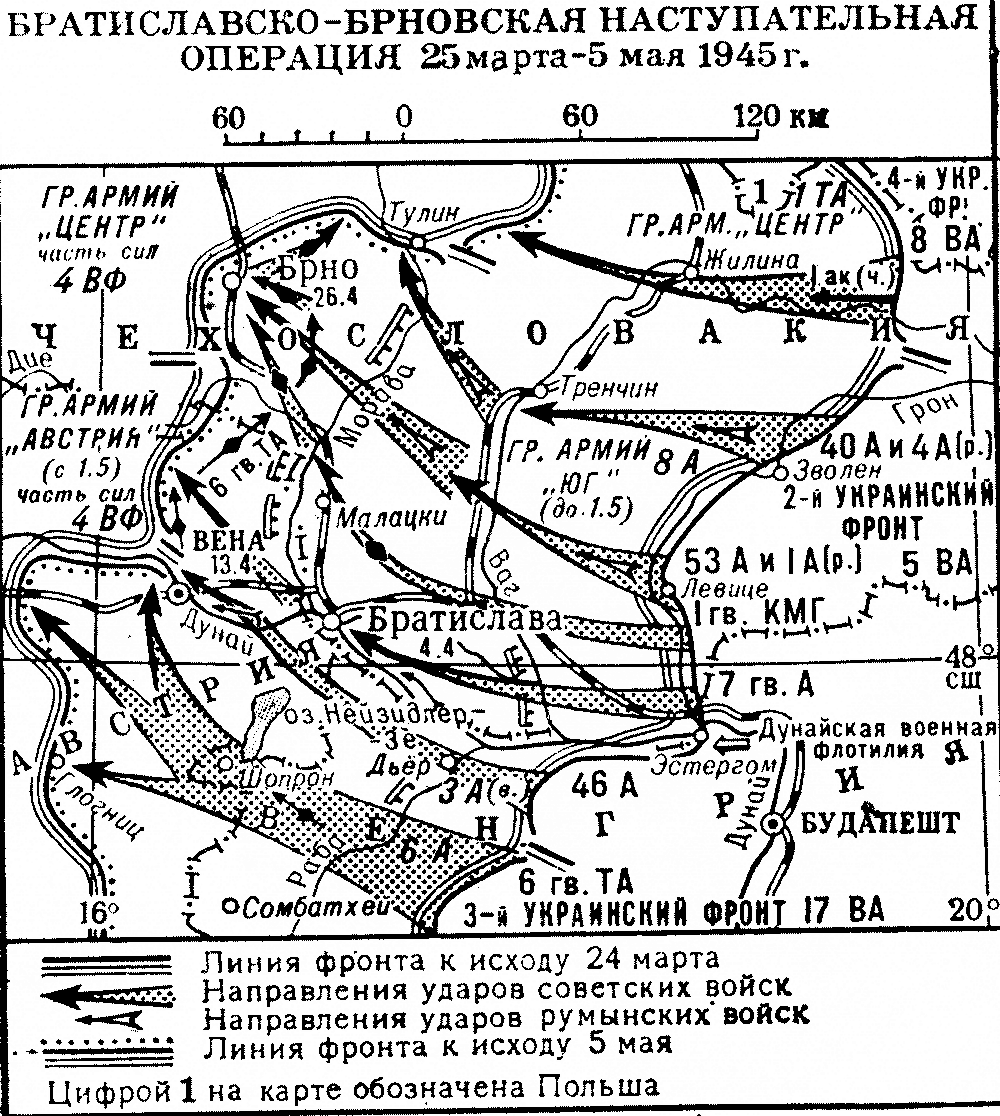
Bratislava-Brno Operation

A new phase of the offensive began on December 5. 53rd Army occupied a line from Eger to Lőrinci facing units of the German 6th Army and the Hungarian 3rd Army. The assault began at 1015 hours following a brief but powerful artillery preparation and the Army was able to advance 2–4 km on the first day despite facing defenses in mountainous terrain and the fighting continued through the night. In the days following the Army was only able to advance with its left-flank units and by December 9 was stalled along a line from Eger to Gyöngyös. The next phase involved completing the encirclement of Budapest and began on December 10 but again the 53rd Army advanced very little until Pliyev's Cavalry-Mechanized Group rolled up the German/Hungarian defense from the Šahy area in the general direction of Szoldiny.

On December 14 Plyiev was ordered to attack in the direction of Kisterenye in conjunction with 53rd Army advancing toward Pásztó. This made only modest progress and on December 18 General Managarov was directed to relieve Plyiev's Group to enable it to regroup for a new assignment. The next day the Army was tasked with reaching a line from Veľký Krtíš to Nemce to Želiezovce. The left-flank forces of 2nd Ukrainian Front attacked at 1000 hours on December 20 but on the first day the 53rd Army made only local advances. By December 29 it had reached a front from Kutas to Szécsény to Balassagyarmat. The encirclement of Budapest had been completed on December 26, but under this command the division played little direct role in the siege of that city.

The 53rd pushed on toward Lučenec before going over to the defense in late February. Units of the Army liberated Banská Štiavnica on March 7. The Bratislava–Brno Offensive began on March 25 with 53rd Army roughly in the center of the Front; by this time the division had been reassigned to 49th Rifle Corps, still in 53rd Army, and it remained in this Corps for the duration. The city of Brno was cleared on April 26 and following the German surrender, on May 28, the 228th would be awarded the Order of Suvorov, 2nd Degree, for its role in this victory. By now 53rd Army was in the process of being sent to the far east in preparation for the Soviet invasion of Manchuria but the division was considered excess to these requirements and was therefore briefly assigned to the Central Group of Forces. According to STAVKA Order No. 11096 of May 29, part 8, the division was listed to be disbanded in place. In accordance to this directive the division was disbanded in July. General Yesin would go on to command the 303rd and 55th Guards Rifle Divisions before his retirement in January 1956.
