= Scoposeni =

Scoposeni may refer to several villages in Romania:

- Scoposeni, a village in Gorban Commune, Iași County
- Scoposeni, a village in Horlești Commune, Iași County
