= Ivan Yesin =

Soviet Army major general

Ivan Nikitovich Yesin
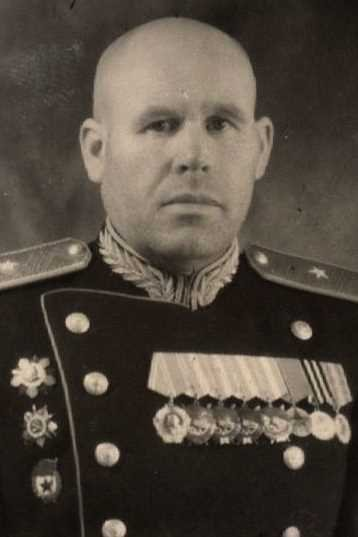
- Yesin, postwar
- Born: 25 August 1900; Chebudasy, Simbirsk Governorate, Russian Empire
- Died: 1 January 1970 (aged 69) Moscow, Soviet Union
- Allegiance: Soviet Union
- Branch: Red Army (Soviet Army from 1946)
- Service years: 1918–1956
- Rank: Major general
- Commands: 38th Guards Rifle Division; 88th Guards Rifle Division; 228th Rifle Division
- Conflicts: Russian Civil War; World War II
- Awards: Order of Lenin

Ivan Nikitovich Yesin (Russian: Иван Никитович Есин; 25 August 1900 – 1 January 1970) was a Soviet Army major general who held division commands during World War II.

A veteran of the Russian Civil War, Yesin rose to command positions in the interwar Red Army and commanded a brigade in the Soviet invasion of Poland. When Operation Barbarossa began, Yesin was commanding a military school. Sent to the front, he was wounded in fighting in the North Caucasus in late 1941 and held a series of staff positions. During mid-1943 he commanded the 38th Guards Rifle Division, but was relieved of command for poor performance. Yesin was reduced to deputy division commander and in early 1944 returned to division command, leading the 228th Rifle Division until the end of the war in the westward Soviet advance. Postwar, he held division command before retiring in the 1950s.

== Early life and Russian Civil War ==
A Russian, Ivan Nikitovich Yesin was born on 25 August 1900 in the village of Chebudasy, Ardatovsky Uyezd, Simbirsk Governorate. He worked as a railway repairman at Atyashevo station. During the Russian Civil War, Yesin was conscripted into the Red Army on 15 May 1918 and sent to the 16th Separate Battalion as a Red Army man for rear duties described in his service record as the “struggle against counterrevolution and speculation” in Nizhny Novgorod. He fought on the Southern Front from September 1919 with the 119th Rifle Regiment of the 14th Rifle Division. He took part in fighting against the White Cossacks of General Mikhail Fostikov in the Kuban, and the suppression of the Dagestan uprising. Yesin was wounded during the war.

== Interwar period ==
Yesin entered the 2nd Vladikavkaz Courses in June 1921, and transferred to the 12th Vladikavkaz Command Courses for Operational Branches in May 1922. Upon graduation in September, Yesin was appointed a platoon commander in the 39th Rifle Regiment of the 13th Dagestan Rifle Division of the North Caucasus Military District in Derbent. He completed the district's recurring training courses in Rostov-on-Don between 19 October 1923 and 21 July 1924, and became a platoon and company commander in the stanitsa of Morozovskaya after returning to the regiment. Yesin transferred to command a company of the division's 38th Rifle Regiment at Millerovo in May 1931. In August 1932 he was appointed a company commander at the Yeysk Military School for Naval Pilots.

Yesin was transferred to the Ukrainian Military District in December of that year to serve as chief of the 6th section of the staff of the 45th Mechanized Corps at Kiev. From December 1934 he held the same position with the 8th Mechanized Brigade, then in December was appointed chief of the 2nd section of the staff of the 135th Rifle and Machine Gun Brigade of the 45th Mechanized Corps. In March 1936 he was transferred to command a rifle and machine gun battalion of the 17th Mechanized Brigade (later redesignated the 23rd Light Tank Brigade) at Proskurov. By an order of 26 December 1938, Yesin, then a major, was appointed commander of the 1st Motor Rifle and Machine Gun Brigade of the 25th Tank Corps at Berdichev. He led the brigade in the advance into western Ukraine during the Soviet invasion of Poland.

After the disbandment of the corps, in April 1940, Yesin, by then a colonel, was appointed chief of infantry of the 81st Motorized Division at Lvov. During October and November he briefly served as deputy commander of the 124th Rifle Division, then was appointed commander of the 6th Motorized Brigade at Brody. On its disbandment in March 1941 Yesin was appointed chief of the Zhitomir Infantry School, relocated to Rostov-on-Don in May.

== World War II ==
After Germany invaded the Soviet Union, Yesin continued to command the school. In October 1941 he was sent with it to the front in the region of Matveyev Kurgan and Taganrog, where he took part in the fighting on the approaches to the city. On 27 November Yesin was wounded and evacuated to a hospital in Kislovodsk. On his recovery in January 1942 he returned to the school, by then in Stavropol. In May Yesin was appointed commander of the 19th Destroyer Brigade, forming in the Armavir region.

On 25 June he was recalled to Moscow and appointed chief of the combat training department of the forming Tambov army. In July the formation of the army was halted, and Yesin appointed to the same position in the Borisoglebsk army. In August this formation was redesignated the 4th Reserve Army, and became the 1st Guards Army on 5 December. With the Southwestern Front, the army fought in the counteroffensive near Stalingrad and the offensive in the Donbass. For his performance as a staff officer, Yesin was recommended for the Order of the Red Star by the army deputy chief of staff in February 1943. The award was upgraded to the Order of the Red Banner, which Yesin was awarded on 6 March 1943. The recommendation read:

Colonel Comrade Yesin himself took an active part in the conduct of the operation of the 1st Guards Army on the Boguchar axis. During the period of the operation, he was employed as an operations worker. He carried out a series of combat missions, going to the troops to communicate orders and examine the situation. For selfless combat work, he is deserving of the award of the Order of the Red Star.

Yesin was appointed commander of the 38th Guards Rifle Division in early March, which took part in combat operations as part of the 26th Guards Rifle Corps of the 6th Army of the Southwestern Front. In late April and early May the division was withdrawn to the army reserve. In mid-July the division was assigned to the 4th Guards Rifle Corps and as part of the 1st Guards Army took part in the Izyum–Barvenkovo offensive. By an order of the army of 25 July 1943, Yesin was relieved of command for “unskillful leadership” and placed at the disposal of the front military council. He was soon reassigned to command the 88th Guards Rifle Division of the 8th Guards Army, but on 7 August for “indecisiveness and weak will,” he was relieved of command again.

Yesin was appointed deputy commander of the 35th Guards Rifle Division on 6 September. He took part in the Donbass offensive and the Battle of the Dnieper in which the division fought as part of the 6th Army. The division liberated Lozovaya during the offensive on 16 September. At the end of October the division was reassigned to the 8th Guards Army of the 3rd Ukrainian Front and with the army took part in the Lower Dnieper offensive, Zaporozhye offensive, Nikopol–Krivoy Rog offensive, and Bereznegovatoye–Snigiryovka offensive. In the last of these operations the division broke through German defenses on the west bank of the Inhulets and liberated Novy Bug.

Yesin took command of the 228th Rifle Division on 28 March. In April it operated as part of the 37th Army in the Odessa offensive, taking Tiraspol on the night of 11–12 April, crossing the Dniester and seizing a bridgehead on the opposite bank near Ternovskaya Plavnya south of Bender. Yesin led the division in repeated failed attacks against Bender between 20 and 25 April. The 228th was withdrawn to the reserve of the 2nd Ukrainian Front on 31 May for rebuilding. From 22 to 31 August it marched to Bucharest, where it was assigned to the 53rd Army, with which it spent the rest of the war. For his performance in command of the 228th, 57th Rifle Corps commander Fyodor Ostashenko recommended Yesin for a second Order of the Red Banner on 9 September, which Yesin was awarded on 31 October:

Guards Colonel Comrade Yesin has commanded the division since March 1944.

The division, led by Yesin, took part in fighting as part of the corps from the Dnieper river and the city of Krivoy Rog to the Dniester river and forced a crossing of the Dniester, taking a bridgehead on its right bank.

For distinguishing itself in combat operations the honorific Voznesensk was conferred on the division. From 1 June to 14 August the division was in the front reserve for rebuilding.

During this time Comrade Yesin organized the training and cohesion of the units of the division with persistence and urgency. From 14 August to 5 September 1944 the division conducted a forced march from the region of Beltsy to the approaches to the Danube river, an expanse of more than 720 kilometers.

Following the forward units, Comrade Yesin excellently ensured the fulfillment of combat missions to liberate Bucharest, for which he was commended in the order of Supreme Commander Comrade Stalin.

For exemplary fulfillment of tasks of the command for the clearing of the territory of Romania from German-Fascist invaders and for decisive assistance in the taking of the city of Bucharest, Comrade Yesin is deserving of the Order of the Red Banner.

Under Yesin's command, the division took part in the Debrecen offensive, Budapest offensive, Bratislava–Brno offensive, and the Prague offensive during the remainder of the war. Yesin was promoted to the rank of major general on 2 November 1944. Ostashenko recommended him for the Order of Suvorov, 2nd class on 12 December for his performance in the operations of late 1944. The award was downgraded to the Order of Kutuzov, 2nd class, which Yesin was awarded on 28 April 1945. The recommendation read:

The division, under the command of Comrade Yesin conducted a thousand-kilometer forced march across the territory of Romania and with sustained battles exited the mountains and with a decisive offensive expanded the bridgehead on the Hungarian hills, successfully forced the Mureș river and liberated the towns of Makó, Mezőhegyes, Nădlac, Csanádpalota, and Hódmezővásárhely and dozens of other settlements from the enemy. In these battles the division captured about 2,000 enemy soldiers and officers and wiped out a great quantity of personnel and equipment.

The 767th Rifle Regiment, subordinated to the division, was first to force the Tisza river and the division in sustained and bitter fighting successfully expanded the bridgehead on the right bank of the Tisza. The division twice forced the Tisza, first in the region of the city of Szeged, and second in the region of the town of Tiszafüred. These actions gave the opportunity for the remaining units of the army to fulfill the mission during the expansion of the bridgehead on its west bank, liberating from the enemy the towns of Szeged, Poroszló, Egerfarmos, Füzesabony and several other settlements.

For distinguishing himself in the conduct of the operation to force the Tisza, for fine organization of the battle to expand the bridgehead on its right bank, as a result of which the division liberated several cities, Comrade Yesin is deserving of the award of the Order of Suvorov 2nd class.

For the seizure of Brno the division was awarded the Order of Suvorov, 2nd class, on 28 May 1945.

== Postwar ==
After the end of the war, Yesin was placed in the officer reserve of the Central Group of Forces Military Council after the 228th was disbanded in July. He was appointed commander of the 303rd Rifle Division in October. The division was transferred to the Stavropol Military District in February and in July reorganized as the 42nd Separate Rifle Brigade, which Yesin continued to command. In March 1948 Yesin was transferred to serve as chief of the Combined Officer Improvement Courses of the North Caucasus Military District. He completed the Improvement Courses for Rifle Division Commanders at the Frunze Military Academy between December 1948 and May 1950, and on graduation was appointed commander of the 55th Guards Rifle Division. In January 1952 Yesin was dismissed from command, and in August appointed deputy commander of the 6th Machine Gun Artillery Division of the Far Eastern Military District. He was transferred to the reserve on 2 January 1956, and died in Moscow on 1 January 1970.

== Awards ==
Yesin was a recipient of the following awards and decorations:

- Order of Lenin
- Order of the Red Banner (4)
- Order of Kutuzov, 2nd class
- Order of the Patriotic War, 1st class
- Medals
