= Sergei Romanovtsev =

Soviet military officer (1925–2022)

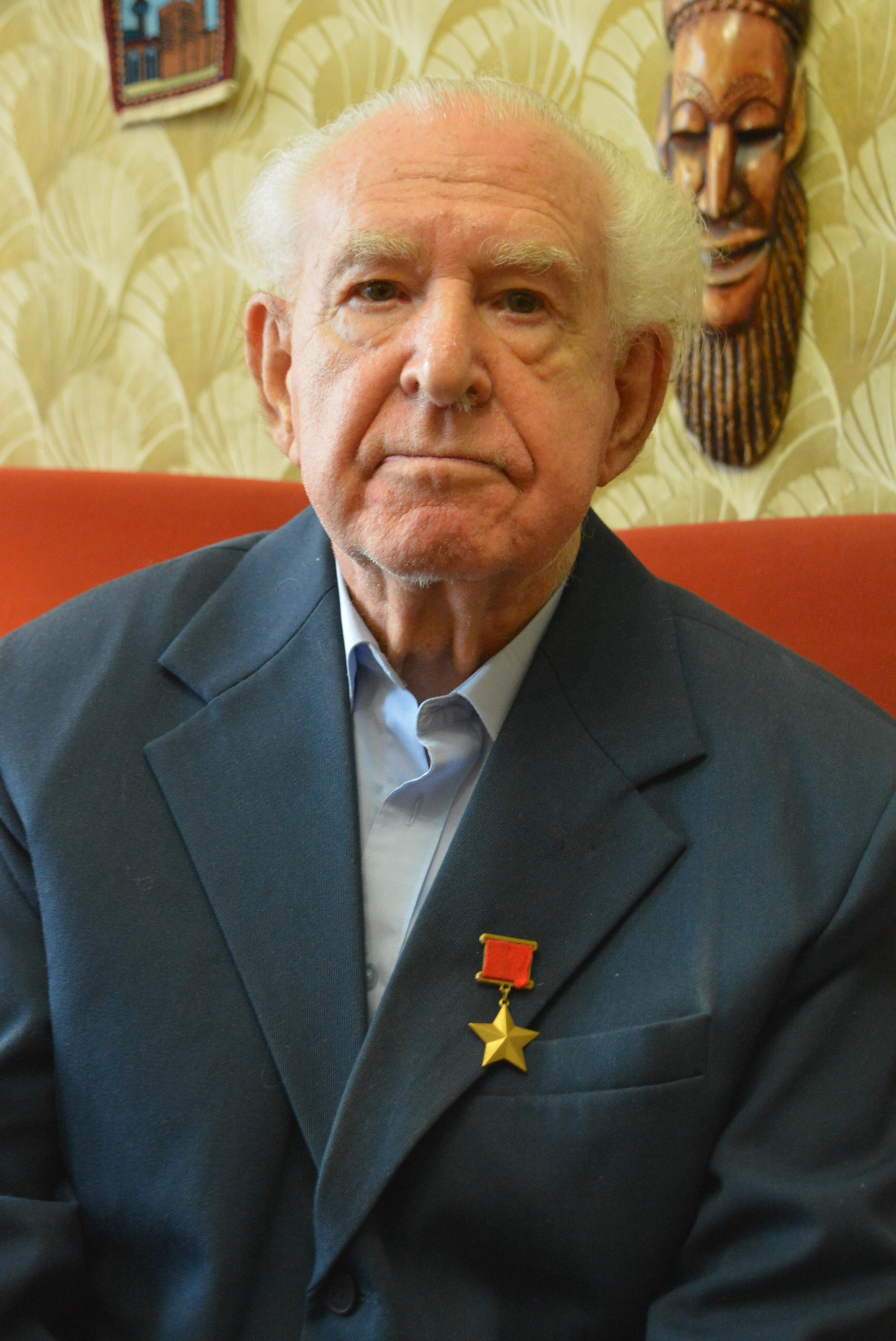
- Romanovtsev in 2016
- Native name: Сергей Дмитриевич Романовцев
- Born: 29 September 1925; Tula, Russian SFSR, USSR
- Died: 26 May 2022 (aged 96) Moscow, Russian Federation
- Allegiance: Soviet Union; Russia
- Branch: Infantry
- Service years: 1941–1992
- Rank: Polkovnik (Colonel)
- Conflicts: Second World War
- Awards: Hero of the Soviet Union; Order of Lenin; Order of the Red Banner; Order of the Patriotic War First Class; Order of Glory Third Class; Medal "For Battle Merit"; Medal "For the Victory over Germany in the Great Patriotic War 1941–1945"; Medal "For the Capture of Berlin"; Medal "For the Liberation of Warsaw"

Sergei Dmitriyevich Romanovtsev (Russian: Сергей Дмитриевич Романовцев; 29 September 1925 – 26 May 2022) was an officer of the Soviet Armed Forces. Over his time in service, he reached the rank of polkovnik, the Soviet equivalent to colonel. In 1944, he was awarded the title of Hero of the Soviet Union.

Deployed to defend his home city of Tula shortly after the Axis invasion of the Soviet Union in June 1941, Romanovtsev later joined the Red Army as commander of a machine-gun squad. He saw action in the heavy fighting in the south of the Soviet Union, and distinguished himself in battle by repelling a number of counterattacks in 1944. Romanovtsev remained in the military after the war, entering the reserves in 1947 and subsequently graduating from military schools. He joined the KGB's foreign intelligence service in 1954, while also being part of the diplomatic service with the Ministry of Foreign Affairs, carrying out duties in Western Europe and North America. He retired in December 1991 with the rank of polkovnik, and with numerous honours and awards. He died in 2022 at the age of 96.

== Early life ==
Romanovtsev was born into the family of a gunsmith on 29 September 1925 in Tula, in the Russian Soviet Socialist Federative Republic. He received a secondary level education, and worked in a local factory. He joined the defence effort shortly after the Axis invasion of the Soviet Union in June 1941, and between July and August 1941 was deployed as part of the Tula youth detachment to build defensive structures along the Dnieper near the city of Dorogobuzh. After the Soviet defeat at the Battle of Smolensk in August, Romanovtsev joined the Red Army in retreat. He was then deployed in defence of Tula in an anti-tank role, and in 1943 he joined the Red Army. He underwent training at the 1st Moscow Machine Gun School, which had been evacuated to Ryazan, and was then deployed to the front in July 1943.

== Second World War ==
By early 1944 Romanovtsev held the rank of guards sergeant, serving as commander of a machine-gun squad of the 266th Guards Rifle Regiment, part of the 88th Guards Rifle Division, 28th Guards Rifle Corps, in the 8th Guards Army. During operations to retake the cities of Zaporizhzhia and Odessa Romanovtsev fought at the crossings of the Inhul and Inhulets rivers, and in defence of the bridgeheads. On 12 February 1944 he took part in repelling seven counterattacks around the settlement of Shyroke. Having cut off the enemy infantry from the supporting tank force, Romanovtsev and his forces were credited with killing 150 German soldiers and officers. On 3 March his detachment crossed the Inhulets, and after repelling further counterattacks in which 65 German soldiers and officers were killed, captured Rudnik and the Inhulets railway station. On 6 March he assisted in the capture of Tsvetkovo in the face of heavy German resistance.

On 3 June 1944 he was awarded the title of Hero of the Soviet Union, and the Order of Lenin.

== Later life ==
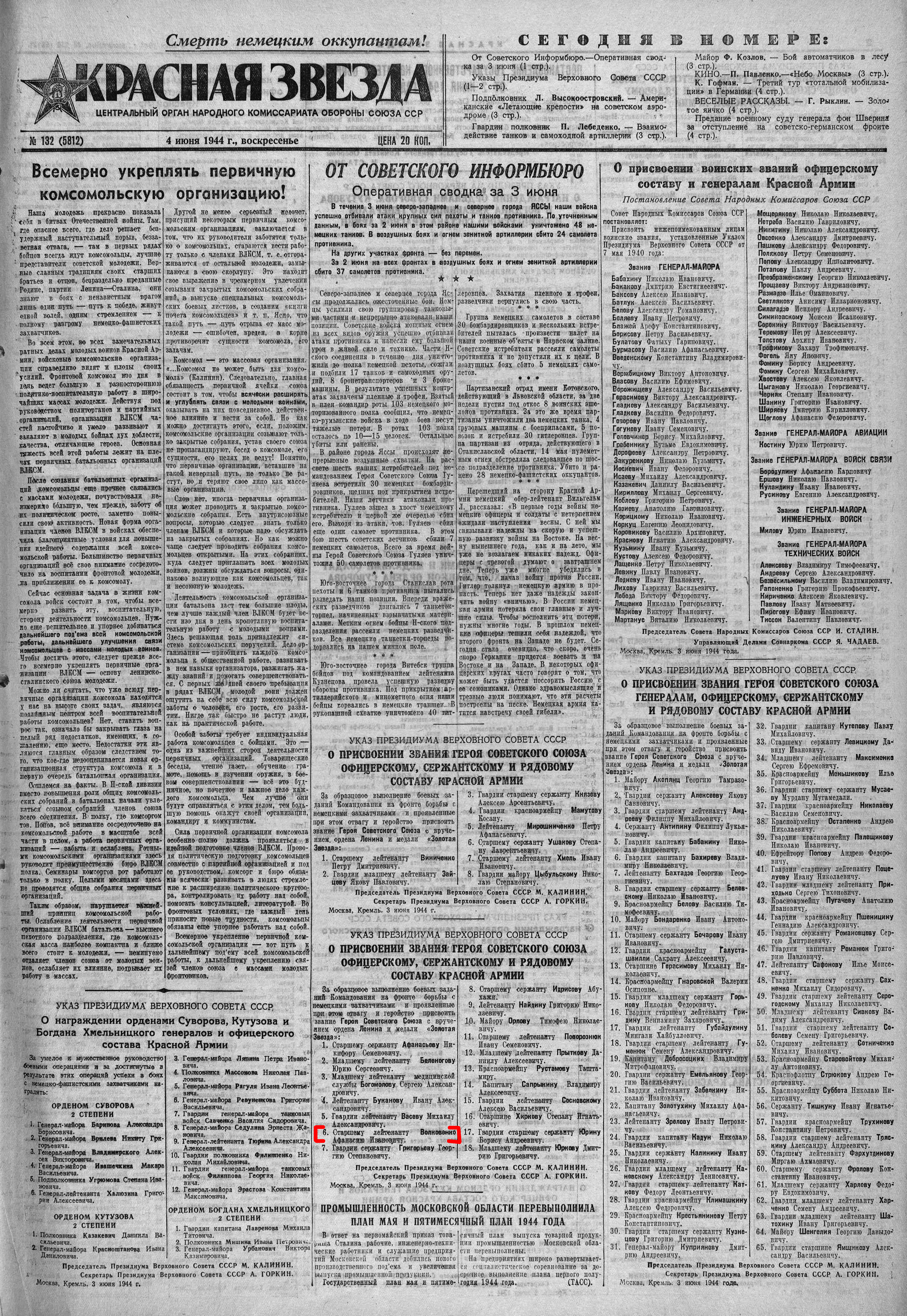
The 4 June 1944 edition of the military newspaper Krasnaya Zvezda, announcing Romanovtsev's award of the title of Hero of the Soviet Union

Romanovtsev remained in the military after the war, entering the reserves in 1947 and subsequently graduating from the Higher Military-Pedagogical Institute in 1952, and then the Academy of the General Staff in 1954. He had been a member of the Communist Party of the Soviet Union since 1944. He joined the KGB's foreign intelligence service in 1954, while also being part of the diplomatic service with the Ministry of Foreign Affairs, carrying out duties in Western Europe and North America. He began as assistant of the Second European Department of the Ministry of Foreign Affairs, and was later employed at the Soviet embassy in Canada from 1955 to 1958, the embassy in the USA from 1960 to 1965, and the embassy in Finland from 1972 to 1976. From 1985 until 1991 he was an adviser in the department for the Non-Aligned Movement, and an adviser in the Department of International Organizations.

He retired in December 1991 with the rank of polkovnik, the Soviet equivalent to colonel, and settled in Moscow. Over his career he had received the title of Hero of the Soviet Union, the Order of Lenin and the Order of the Red Banner, as well as the Order of the Patriotic War First Class, the Order of Glory Third Class, and various medals, including those "For Battle Merit", "For the Victory over Germany in the Great Patriotic War 1941–1945", "For the Capture of Berlin", and "For the Liberation of Warsaw". He joined the United Russia political party on 19 February 2013.

Romanovtsev died on 26 May 2022, at the age of 96.
