= 8th Guards Cavalry Division =

8th S. I. Morozov Guards Rovno Red Banner Order of Suvorov Cavalry Division
- Active: 1941–1959
- Country: Soviet Union
- Branch: Red Army (Soviet Army from 1946)
- Type: Cavalry
- Engagements: World War II
- Decorations: Order of the Red Banner; Order of Suvorov
- Battle honours: Rovno

The 8th S. I. Morozov Guards Rovno Red Banner Order of Suvorov Cavalry Division (Russian: 8-я гвардейская кавалерийская Ровенская Краснознамённая ордена Суворова дивизия имени С.И.Морозова) was a cavalry division of the Red Army during World War II. Postwar, it was stationed in Ukraine as the 10th Guards Mechanized Division, which was reorganized as the 83rd Guards Motor Rifle Division in 1957 before being disbanded in 1959.

== World War II ==
The division was formed as the 89th Cavalry Division in Chkalov in accordance with an order dated 11 August 1941. Before the war, the 11th Morozov Cavalry Division had been based in Chkalov, so the 89th Division command petitioned for the renaming of the division to the 11th Cavalry Division named for Morozov. The petition was accepted and on 29 September the division was officially renamed. The 11th Cavalry Division was reorganized as the 8th Guards Cavalry Division on 19 January 1943. The division was awarded the Order of the Red Banner on 14 November 1944, the Order of Suvorov 2nd class on 17 May 1945, and the Rovno honorific on 7 February 1944.

== Postwar ==
The division was reorganized as the 10th Guards Mechanized Division on 1 August 1945, to include the following elements:

- 36th Guards Orders of Kutuzov and Bogdan Khmelnitsky 2nd class Mechanized Regiment
- 37th Guards Red Banner Order of Suvorov 3rd class Mechanized Regiment
- 38th Guards Orders of Aleksandr Nevsky and Bogdan Khmelnitsky 2nd class Mechanized Regiment
- 123rd Guards Gatchina Red Banner Orders of Suvorov and Kutuzov Tank Regiment
- 100th Guards Novgorod Red Banner Order of Suvorov 3rd class Heavy Tank-Self Propelled Artillery Regiment
- 689th Molodechno Howitzer Artillery Regiment
- 116th Guards Mortar Regiment
- 1732nd Debrecen Order of Kutuzov 3rd class Anti-Aircraft Artillery Regiment
- 4th Separate Guards Lvov Red Banner Order of Kutuzov 2nd class Mortar Battalion
- 213th Separate Guards Order of the Red Star Communications Battalion
- 12th Separate Guards Brandenburg Order of Aleksandr Nevsky Motorcycle Battalion
- 150th Separate Guards Sapper Battalion
- 623rd Medical-Sanitary Battalion
- 33rd Auto Transport Battalion
- 260th Mobile Tank Repair Base
- 89th Separate Training Tank Battalion

The division relocated to Rovno in July 1945, becoming part of the 27th Rifle Corps of the 13th Army. In accordance with a directive dated 25 April 1953, the division was reorganized to a reduced table of organization and equipment, reorganizing the 116th Guards Mortar Regiment to the 945th Guards Howitzer Artillery Regiment, the 12th Separate Guards Motorcycle Battalion to the 12th Separate Guards Reconnaissance Battalion, and the 102nd Guards, 206th Guards, and 157th Separate Tank Battalions of the mechanized regiments into tank battalions (not separate). The 414th Separate Chemical Defense Platoon was formed as a result of the reorganization. As a result of unit renumberings on 4 March 1955, the 1732nd Anti-Aircraft Artillery Regiment became the 488th Anti-Aircraft Artillery Regiment, and the 623rd Separate Medical-Sanitary Battalion the 111th. The 945th Guards Artillery Regiment and 256th Artillery Repair Workshop were disbanded. The 27th Rifle Corps headquarters was disbanded in August 1956 and the division came under direct army control. The division relocated to Lutsk in September 1956.

Between 15 June and 15 July 1957 the division was reorganized as the 83rd Guards Motor Rifle Division, to include the following elements:

- Headquarters (Military Unit Number 3466)
- 311th Guards Motor Rifle Regiment (12945), former 36th Guards Mechanized Regiment
- 313th Guards Motor Rifle Regiment (26045), former 38th Guards Mechanized Regiment
- 37th Guards Motor Rifle Regiment (17654), former 37th Guards Mechanized Regiment
- 123rd Guards Tank Regiment (75658)
- 689th Artillery Regiment (43601)
- 488th Anti-Aircraft Artillery Regiment (14246)
- 4th Guards Separate Mortar Battalion (89557)
- 100th Guards Separate Reconnaissance Company (66961), former 12th Guards Separate Reconnaissance Battalion
- 213th Guards Separate Communications Battalion (43607)
- 150th Guards Separate Sapper Battalion (75570)
- 111th Separate Medical Sanitary Battalion
- 33rd Auto Transport Battalion

The division was disbanded on 21 September 1959.

== Commanders ==
The following officers commanded the division:

- Colonel Mikhail Surzhikov (7 September 1941 – 19 August 1943, major general 4 February 1943)
- Colonel Yevgeny Korkuts (20 August – 10 October 1943)
- Colonel Dmitry Pavlov (10 October 1943 – 19 April 1947, major general 17 January 1944)
- Major General Semyon Chernobay (19 April – October 1947)
- Major General Yermolay Koberidze (15 April 1948 – December 1950)
- Major General Vladimir Aleksandrovich Gusev (December 1950 – 30 March 1955)
- Colonel Vasily Kirillovich Yankovsky (30 March 1955 – 13 July 1957, major general 8 August 1955)
- Colonel Nikolay Pavlovich Makarov (13 July 1957 – 1959)
