= 337th Rifle Division =

- Active: 1941–1946
- Country: Soviet Union
- Branch: Red Army
- Type: Infantry
- Size: Division
- Engagements: Barvenkovo–Lozovaya Offensive; Second Battle of Kharkov; Battle of the Caucasus; Belgorod-Khar'kov Offensive Operation; Battle of the Dniepr; Battle of Kiev (1943); Battle of the Korsun–Cherkassy Pocket; First Jassy–Kishinev Offensive; Second Jassy-Kishinev Offensive; Battle of Debrecen; Vienna Offensive
- Decorations: Order of the Red Banner (2nd Formation); Order of Suvorov 2nd class (2nd Formation); Order of Bogdan Khmelnitsky (2nd Formation)
- Battle honours: Lubny

Commanders
- Notable commanders: Col. Sergei Mikhailovich Bushev; Maj. Gen. Ilia Vasilevich Vasilev; Maj. Gen. Nikolai Ivanovich Dementev; Maj. Gen. Grigorii Osipovich Lyaskin; Col. Taras Pavlovich Gorobets

The 337th Rifle Division was first formed in August 1941, as a standard Red Army rifle division, at Astrakhan. Like the 335th Rifle Division, this formation was assigned to the southern sector of the Soviet-German front during the winter counteroffensive, but was encircled and destroyed during the German spring offensive that formed the Izium Pocket. The division was formed again from July until August 13, 1942, serving in the Caucasus and along the coast of the Black Sea before being moved to the central part of the front to take part in the Soviet counteroffensive following the Battle of Kursk. As the front advanced towards the Dniepr River the 337th was recognized for its role in the liberation of the Ukrainian city of Lubny and was granted its name as an honorific. As the division continued to advance through northern and western Ukraine and into Hungary, it earned further honors before ending its combat path in western Austria.

== 1st Formation ==
The division first began forming on August 22, 1941 at Astrakhan in the North Caucasus Military District. Its basic order of battle was as follows:

- 1127th Rifle Regiment
- 1129th Rifle Regiment
- 1131st Rifle Regiment
- 899th Artillery Regiment
- 616th Sapper Battalion

Its first commander, Col. Sergei Mikhailovich Bushev, was appointed on the same day. In October, while still barely formed, the division was assigned to 57th Army, which was also just in the process of forming-up in the Reserve of the Supreme High Command at Stalingrad. In January, 1942 the division went into combat with its Army in Southwestern Front, taking part in the Barvenkovo–Lozovaya Offensive which led to the creation of the Izium salient south of Kharkov. By the end of January, 1942, the 337th was reassigned to 6th Army, still in Southwestern Front, in the northeastern sector of the salient.

=== Second Battle of Kharkov ===
Maj. Gen. Ilia Vasilevich Vasilev took command of the division on February 26. When the Soviet offensive to liberate Kharkov began in May, the 337th was in a defensive deployment along a long sector on the right (southern) bank of the Northern Donets River, holding the north shoulder of the salient with the 47th Rifle Division to the west and the 304th to the east, facing the German 44th Infantry Division in its own salient based on Andreevka and Balakleia. Through the course of the offensive, and the German counter-offensive, which began on May 17, it maintained these positions, even as the situation deteriorated both to the south and the north. On May 22 the 1st Panzer Army in the division's rear linked up with the 44th Infantry to its front, and the 337th was encircled. On May 23 the 3rd Panzer Division, which had been freed up by the collapse of the Soviet offensive north of Kharkov, drove into its positions across the Donets, causing havoc. On May 25, while directing breakout efforts, General Vasilev was severely wounded in the chest, and died later that day near the village of Kamenka. On the same date the division headquarters disintegrated and the division was officially disbanded.

== 2nd Formation ==
A new 337th Rifle Division was formed in the high summer of 1942, once again in the North Caucasus Military District. Its order of battle remained the same as that of the first formation, with the addition of the 889th Antitank Battalion. Col. G. M. Kochenov was appointed to command on August 13, but he would be replaced by Col. Nikolai Ivanovich Dementev on September 6. With German panzers driving towards the Prokhladnyi and Mozdok regions, on August 23 the STAVKA ordered the formation of a new 24th Army to defend the Makhachkala region. The 337th was assigned to this new Army, but on August 28 the order was countermanded, re-designating the new Army as the 58th.

As German Army Group A continued its drive to capture the Caucasian oil fields, on September 29, Lt. Gen. I.I. Maslennikov, commander of the Transcausasus Front's Northern Group of Forces, received orders for defense of the region from the STAVKA, including the following:

"...2. To secure this defense... concentrate: a) The 337th Rifle Division, 256th Rifle and 9th and 10th Guards Rifle Brigades, and 52nd Tank Brigade in the Kalaus, Voznesenskaia, and Balashov regions..."

By October 23 the division was in 44th Army. It appeared to Maslennikov that, although the Germans had taken Mozdok and some territory to its south, they were a spent force and he was proposing a counterattack with a group that would include the 337th. In the event this was forestalled two days later when the "spent" Germans launched a renewed drive to the southwest and then to the east; this attack was halted at the gates of Ordzhonikidze on November 5, at which time the division was serving in 9th Army.

In January, 1943 the division was moved to the 47th Army in the Black Sea Group of Forces of the Transcaucasus Front, which became the North Caucasus Front the next month. On January 27, Colonel Dementev was promoted to Major General, but just five days later he was severely wounded; he would be hospitalized for five months and would never return to the front. He was first replaced by Col. S. F. Sklyarov for about a month until Col. Grigorii Osipovich Lyaskin was appointed to command of the division on March 8; on April 28 he was promoted to Major General. Also in April the combat path of the 337th veered sharply northwards as it and its Army were transferred to the Steppe Military District in the Reserve of the Supreme High Command, backing up the Soviet forces deployed in the Kursk salient. Following the Battle of Kursk the division re-entered the fighting front in late July in the Voronezh Front to take part in the Belgorod-Khar'kov Offensive Operation.

As the offensive expanded into eastern Ukraine, on September 18, the division was recognized for its role in the liberation of Lubny as follows:

"LUBNY" - 337 Rifle Division (Major General Lyaskin, Gregorii Osipovich)... by the order of the Supreme High Command the 337th Rifle Division is awarded the name Lubny.

In the same month Voronezh Front assigned the division to the 47th Rifle Corps of 40th Army, and in November the division, still in 47th Corps, joined the 27th Army in 1st Ukrainian Front (former Voronezh Front). On February 13, 1944, General Lyaskin handed his command to Col. Taras Pavlovich Gorobets, who would remain in that post for the duration. The 337th would remain in 27th Army for the duration of the war, moving to 2nd Ukrainian Front in March. From that month, and for most of the rest of the war, the division was in the 33rd Rifle Corps.

=== First Jassy-Kishinev Offensive ===
On February 26 the 337th was awarded the Order of Bogdan Khmelnitsky, 2nd Class, in recognition of its successes in the Korsun-Shevchenovski Operation. On April 8 it was further honored for its role in forcing a crossing of the Dniestr River and the subsequent capture of the city of Beltsi with the award of the Order of the Red Banner.

In Marshal I. S. Konev's plan for a breakthrough of the German-Romanian front west of Iasi in the second week of April, his 40th and 27th Armies were designated as his shock groups. In the event, while the division's corps-mates, 78th and 180th Rifle Divisions, made a strong but unsuccessful effort against 24th Panzer Division defending the town of Podu Iloaiei up to April 12, the 337th held a defensive line facing the Romanian 7th Infantry Division northwest of Iasi.

Konev planned a new offensive later that month, which included a diversionary attack directly on Iasi. Early on April 24 several reinforced rifle battalions of the 337th were to conduct a reconnaissance-in-force along the road from Zahorna to Iasi. Regardless of the success of this reconnaissance, the remainder of 33rd Corps, with armor support, was to attack the Romanian 18th Infantry Division between Tautesti and Vinaturi early the next day. On the 26th, forces of the 52nd Army would join the attack, backed by additional tanks and the 337th in support, all in the aim of capturing the enemy's defenses at Vulturi, 6 km due north of Iasi. In the event, the reconnaissance made few gains, while the main attack managed to wedge up to 2–3 km into the Romanian defenses east of Tautesti before reinforcements from the German 79th and 46th Infantry, and 24th Panzer Divisions forced 33rd Corps back to its jumping-off positions by the end of April 28.

A further effort was scheduled to begin on May 2. An extensive regrouping moved 78th Rifle Division westwards to reinforce the 35th Guards Rifle Corps, while the remainder of 33rd Corps was make a supporting assault northwest of Iasi, beginning at 0615 hrs. This made no progress against stubborn resistance, for a loss of 24 men killed and 113 wounded. Konev's forces persisted in their attacks until May 7, but this produced nothing but casualties for the 337th. The front remained mostly quiet until near the end of the month.

During this time Konev ordered a major regrouping of his forces to the sector north of Iasi, intending to make another effort against that city. However, on May 24 he was reassigned to command of the 1st Ukrainian Front; he was replaced by Gen. R. I. Malinovsky and the offensive was cancelled. German intelligence had noticed the regrouping, and their 8th Army made plans for a preemptive attack. This began on May 30 and took the Soviet forces by surprise. The 337th and 202nd Divisions of 33rd Corps were deployed defensively on an 8 km sector from Horlesti to Avantul, backed by forward elements of 16th Tank Corps about 5 km to the rear. The Axis forces attacking were from Grossdeutschland Panzer Grenadier and 24th Panzer Divisions, backed by the Romanian 3rd and 18th Divisions. The initial assault, Operation Sonja, hit 52nd Army to the east and continued until June 1, driving a deep wedge into its defenses. The next day the second phase, Operation Katja, was launched against 27th Army. By now, 206th Rifle Division had arrived from the west to support the rest of 33rd Corps. The attack hit the boundary between 33rd Corps and 52nd Army and collapsed the 337th's defenses around Horlesti, bypassing that town and moving towards Zahorna, which was held by the division's second echelon rifle regiment. Horlesti was soon captured, and the division fell back rapidly to the north. By midday the Soviet front was pierced in many places, and Grossdeutschland's fusilier regiment in particular had caused heavy casualties to the 337th. By mid-morning the 33rd Corps was described as "shattered", and on June 3 only "remnants" of the division were still in the fight. The arrival of the 27th Guards Rifle Corps, and especially the 409th Rifle Division, brought Katya to a halt by June 6.

=== Second Jassy-Kishinev Offensive ===
The division rebuilt at the front through the rest of June and July. The plan for the next Soviet offensive called for 27th Army to lead its attack with 104th and 35th Guards Rifle Corps with 33rd Corps in second echelon; the 337th's divisional artillery was to support 35th Guards Corps' assault. In the days leading up to the offensive the division had to change its front sectors twice, at night and under heavy security. The offensive opened on August 20, and the 337th entered the fighting the next day. The Corps' objective was the enemy defensive line along the Mare Ridge. During the morning the attack ran into resistance from remnants of Romanian 5th Infantry Division, a regiment of the German 46th Infantry Division, and Romanian 13th Infantry Division, supported by tanks. Counterattacks by these Axis forces were held off, and in the afternoon were crushed; despite this, 33rd Corps, which was tasked to take Mare Ridge, only reached its forward edge by the end of the day. This proved a temporary setback. On August 22 the 337th, taking advantage of the 5th Guards Tank Corps operating ahead of it, broke into the clear and advanced far to the south, reaching the Birlad River and crossing it near Todiresti.

== Postwar ==
In the last weeks of the war 27th Army was reassigned to 3rd Ukrainian Front, and the division ended the war in western Austria having earned the full title of 337th Rifle, Lubny, Order of the Red Banner, Order of Suvorov, Order of Bogdan Khmelnitsky Division (Russian: 337-я стрелковая Лубненская Краснознамённая орденов Суворова и Богдана Хмельницкого дивизия). The division was initially part of the Southern Group of Forces with the 27th Army, but was later transferred to Vinnytsia in the Carpathian Military District and disbanded by May 1946 as part of 33rd Rifle Corps.
