= 88th Guards Rifle Division =

- Active: 1943–1947
- Country: Soviet Union
- Branch: Red Army
- Type: Division
- Role: Infantry
- Engagements: Izyum-Barvenkovo Offensive; Donbas Strategic Offensive (August 1943); Battle of the Dniepr; Nikopol–Krivoi Rog Offensive; Odessa Offensive; First Jassy-Kishinev Offensive; Operation Bagration; Lublin–Brest Offensive; Vistula-Oder Offensive; Battle of Poznań (1945); Battle of the Seelow Heights; Battle of Berlin
- Decorations: Order of Lenin; Order of the Red Banner; Order of Suvorov; Order of Bogdan Khmelnitsky
- Battle honours: Zaporozhye

Commanders
- Notable commanders: Maj. Gen. Vladimir Yakovlevich Vladimirov; Maj. Gen. Grigorii Ivanovich Vekhin; Maj. Gen. Boris Nikiforovich Pankov; Col. Efim Timofeevich Marchenko

The 88th Guards Rifle Division was reformed as an elite infantry division of the Red Army in April 1943, based on the 1st formation of the 99th Rifle Division, and served in that role until after the end of the Great Patriotic War. It would become one of the most highly decorated rifle divisions of the Red Army.

The 99th had distinguished itself in the fighting around Stalingrad as part of 66th Army but was transferred to 62nd Army near the end of the battle and when that Army became the 8th Guards Army the 88th Guards joined the 28th Guards Rifle Corps and it would serve under these commands for the duration. The division inherited the Order of the Red Banner that the 99th had won in July 1941. The Army failed to penetrate into the Donbas in July, but when the offensive was renewed in August it joined the summer offensive through eastern Ukraine to the Dniepr River. In mid-October the division would win an honorific for its part in the liberation of Zaporozhye. Through the winter it would take part in the battles in the great bend of the Dniepr, now as part of 3rd Ukrainian Front. It soon also won the Order of Suvorov in recognition of its role in the fighting along the Inhulets River and the subsequent exploitation to the west. Following the liberation of Odessa in April 1944 it advanced into the estuary of the Dniestr River but, unable to find a viable crossing, backtracked to the north and then became involved in defensive fighting for a bridgehead south of Grigoriopol. After the Front went over to the defense the 8th Guards Army was transferred to 1st Belorussian Front where it remained for the duration. The 88th Guards earned another decoration for its part in breaking the German defense west of Kovel in the later stage of Operation Bagration and after helping to liberate the city of Lublin entered the bridgehead over the Vistula at Magnuszew in the first days of August.

During the Vistula-Oder Offensive several of the division's regiments and other subunits were recognized with honorifics or decorations for their success in the advance into Poland. In early February the 88th Guards helped to expand a bridgehead over the Oder River near Küstrin and remained in that position until the final offensive on Berlin began in mid-April. The division and its units collected further honors during this offensive and ended the war in the center of the city near the Zoological Garden. The 88th Guards was assigned to occupation duty in the Soviet sector of Germany but was disbanded in early 1947.

== Formation ==
At the beginning of March 1943 the 99th Rifle Division was part of 62nd Army in the Reserve of the Supreme High Command en route to the Kupiansk region following the victory at Stalingrad; by April 1 the Army had been assigned to Southwestern Front as it reorganized as the 8th Guards Army. On April 17 the division was redesignated as the 88th Guards; it would receive its Guards banner on May 17. It inherited the Order of the Red Banner won by the 99th on July 22, 1941 in recognition of its role in the border battles near Przemyśl; this was the first decoration awarded to any Red Army unit following the German invasion. The 266th Guards Rifle Regiment also retained the Order of the Red Banner that had been presented to the 1st Rifle Regiment on February 22, 1941 in recognition of the 23rd anniversary of the Red Army. Once the division completed its reorganization its order of battle was as follows:

- 266th Guards Rifle Regiment (from 1st Rifle Regiment)
- 269th Guards Rifle Regiment (from 197th Rifle Regiment)
- 271st Guards Rifle Regiment (from 206th Rifle Regiment)
- 194th Guards Artillery Regiment (from 22nd Artillery Regiment)
- 96th Guards Antitank Battalion
- 93rd Guards Reconnaissance Company
- 102nd Guards Sapper Battalion
- 157th Guards Signal Battalion (later 2nd Guards Signal Company)
- 98th Guards Medical/Sanitation Battalion
- 92nd Guards Chemical Defense (Anti-gas) Company
- 94th Guards Motor Transport Company
- 91st Guards Field Bakery
- 90th Guards Divisional Veterinary Hospital
- 981st Field Postal Station
- 706th Field Office of the State Bank

The division remained under the command of Maj. Gen. Vladimir Yakovlevich Vladimirov, who had commanded the 99th since October 1941. In late April it was assigned to the 28th Guards Rifle Corps along with the 39th and 79th Guards Rifle Divisions; the 88th Guards would remain under this Corps command in the 8th Guards Army for the duration of the war. On May 14 General Vladimirov was made the chief-of-staff of 8th Guards Army and three days later Maj. Gen. Grigorii Ivanovich Vekhin was moved from command of the 152nd Rifle Division to take over the 88th Guards. During early July it was reported that the personnel of the division were roughly 70 percent Russian, with the remaining 30 percent of several Asian nationalities.

== Into Ukraine ==
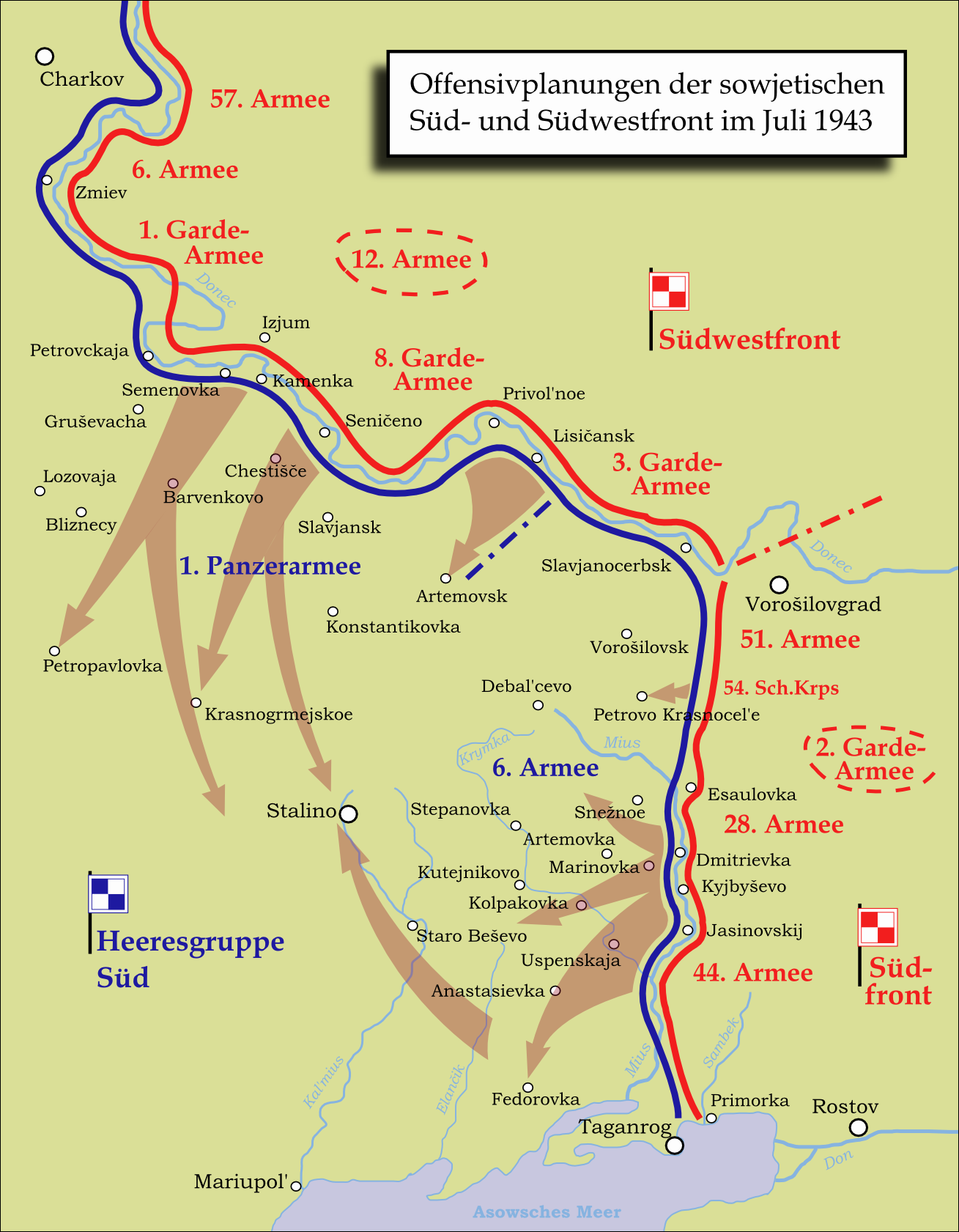
Izyum-Barvenkovo Offensive. Note position of 8th Guards Army.

On July 17, days after the German offensive at Kursk was suspended, Southwestern Front began an offensive against the German 1st Panzer Army in an effort to force the Severskii Donets River and advance into the Donbas. While the 8th Guards was able to force a crossing and establish a bridgehead it was halted by counterattacks and the effort was suspended on July 27. On the same day Col. Ivan Yesin took over command of the 88th Guards, but he would hold this post only until August 7 when he was replaced by Col. Boris Nikiforovich Pankov. This officer would be promoted to the rank of major general on November 17 and would lead the division, apart from two short breaks, for the duration of the war.

A renewed offensive began on August 13 and although Southwestern Front was initially unable to penetrate the front of 1st Panzer Army south of Izium the Southern Front broke through the recreated 6th Army beginning on August 18. By August 23 1st Panzer was also in trouble with its army corps south of Izium reduced to a combat strength of just 5,800 men and unable to hold a continuous line. On the 31st Field Marshal E. von Manstein was finally authorized to withdraw both armies to the Kalmius River, effectively beginning the race to the Dniepr. In a slashing attack on the morning of September 6 Southwestern Front rammed through a mechanized corps and nine rifle divisions north of the boundary between the two German armies, unhinging the Kalmius line.

During the Battle of the Dniepr, 8th Guards Army closed on the city of Zaporozhye, which had been von Manstein's headquarters in early September. On Hitler's orders 1st Panzer Army held a bridgehead over the river centered on the city. Southwestern Front's first attack on October 1 made minor gains that were soon erased by counterattacks. This led to a week-long pause in operations for regrouping. On the morning of October 10 the 8th and 3rd Guards Armies renewed the offensive against the bridgehead beginning with a very powerful artillery preparation. While the bridgehead line held the casualties on both sides were very heavy and the commander of 1st Panzer Army again requested permission to withdraw, which was refused. A night attack on the 13th, supported by another massive artillery bombardment, compelled the German forces to abandon the city the next day. In recognition of its role in this success, the men and women of the division were awarded the city's name as an honorific:

ZAPOROZHYE... 88th Guards Rifle Division (Col. Pankov, Boris Nikiforovich)... The troops who participated in the liberation of Zaporozhye, by the order of the Supreme High Command of 14 October 1943, and a commendation in Moscow, are given a salute of 20 artillery salvoes from 224 guns.

On October 20 Southwestern Front was redesignated as 3rd Ukrainian Front.

=== Battles in the Dniepr Bend ===
Both 3rd and 4th Ukrainian Fronts attempted to rush the cities of Nikopol and Krivoi Rog in December but this was unsuccessful. 3rd Ukrainian faced a well-fortified line along the Kamianka River. On January 10, 1944 it attacked in the direction of Apostolove but this effort also failed after a week. A revised plan called for the 46th Army, 8th Guards Army and the 4th Guards Mechanized Corps to remount the offensive on Apostolove with the objective of reducing Nikopol in cooperation with 4th Ukrainian Front. This new effort began on January 30 and the defense system covering the two cities was finally cracked on February 5 when Apostolove was taken, splitting the 6th Army. 46th and 8th Guards Armies now turned west toward the Inhulets River while elements of 4th Ukrainian Front cleared Nikopol on February 9. Krivoi Rog was covered in part by defenses along the Inhulets which were breached by 8th Guards at Shyroke on February 6 but it wasn't until February 22 that the city was liberated by 37th Army. At this point 3rd Ukrainian Front was poised to strike along the Mykolaiv - Odessa axis.

During the battle for Shyroke on February 12 Jr. Sgt. Sergei Dmitrievich Romanovtsev distinguished himself for his leadership of a heavy machine gun section of the 266th Guards Rifle Regiment and became a Hero of the Soviet Union. In the fighting for a bridgehead over the Inhulets he and his team repulsed seven German counterattacks with their fire. He would be awarded his Gold Star on June 3.

=== Battles on the Dniestr ===
It recognition of its role in the fighting for the Inhulets and the subsequent liberation of Novyi Buh the division was awarded the Order of Suvorov, 2nd Degree, on March 19. As the Odessa Offensive continued in early April the 8th Guards Army was advancing through difficult conditions along the southernmost sector of the front in Ukraine, along the northern shores of the Black Sea. Mykolaiv had been liberated on March 28 and shortly after several German and Romanian divisions were trapped at Rozdilna. The Front's center and left flank armies now advanced directly on Odessa and on April 10 that city was liberated by a three-pronged attack by 8th Guards, 6th and 5th Shock Armies. During this fighting on April 5 General Pankov was wounded and hospitalized; while he recovered he was replaced in command of the division by Col. Efim Timofeevich Marchenko but would return to his position on June 25.

Following this, 8th Guards Army advanced into the estuary of the Dniestr River by April 13 with the 28th Guards Corps reaching southwestward toward Ovidiopol. A force of cavalry from Pliyev's Cavalry-Mechanized Group had been encircled here by German forces escaping from Odessa and once these were relieved the Corps attempted to cross the estuary but this was stymied by spring flood waters and shortages of supplies and equipment. To escape this strategic dead end the Corps was ordered to backtrack north to Palanka where it rejoined the rest of 8th Guards Army by the end of the month.

In early May the Army was ordered north along the east bank of the river to relieve 5th Guards Army in the bridgehead it held at Tașlîc. This relief occurred over the nights of May 5, 6 and 7. The 88th Guards took up positions at the northern end of the bridgehead facing the remnants of the 17th Infantry Division south of Grigoriopol. All this activity was not missed by the Axis forces on the west bank, and very early on May 10 the XXXX Panzer Corps launched a powerful attack to drive in the bridgehead before the relief operation was complete. After several hours of heavy fighting the forward defenses of the 39th and 79th Guards Divisions had to be abandoned and the Corps commander, Maj. Gen. S. I. Morozov, was forced to personally gather reserves to defend the village of Puhăceni; this included heavy antiaircraft guns commanded by Cpt. V. G. Zaitsev who had gained fame as a sniper at Stalingrad. On the second day the pressure on 28th Guards Corps relented somewhat as the panzers wheeled southwards to strike the positions of 4th Guards Rifle Corps at Șerpeni which covered the Army's only crossing point at Butor. Over the next two days the assault forced the bridgehead back until it was about 11km wide but only 1-3km deep. On the morning of May 14 units of the 29th Guards Rifle Corps entered the bridgehead and partially relieved the 39th Guards, helping to stabilize the situation; late on May 18 this division turned its defensive sector over to the 88th Guards and was evacuated to the "Vinogradar" Collective Farm on the Dniestr's east bank. Due to this setback, among others, the Soviet offensive was halted, and would not resume until August.

== Operation Bagration ==
At a STAVKA conference held in Moscow in the last days of May it was decided to reassign the 8th Guards Army to the left wing of the 1st Belorussian Front as part of the preparations for the main Soviet summer offensive. The Army would remain in this Front for the duration of the war. This movement was not completed until late June, after the first phase of the offensive was completed, but in time to take a leading role in the Lublin–Brest Offensive. The 8th Guards was one of five combined-arms armies and a tank army ordered to be prepared to attack by July 17 in the direction of Siedlce and Lublin, with part of these forces to capture Brest in conjunction with the Front's right wing forces. The 11th Tank Corps was designated as the Army's mobile group. The 88th Guards played a leading role in breaking through the German defense west of Kovel, in recognition of which it would be awarded the Order of Bogdan Khmelnitsky, 2nd Degree, on August 9.

By the end of July 22 the 3rd Tank Corps, advancing as the vanguard of 28th Guards Corps, reached the Wieprz River and seized a bridgehead from the march; the next day the two corps jointly took the city of Lublin. At this time the 28th Guards Corps was operating along the left flank of 8th Guards Army and the Army was advancing at a pace of up to 27km per day. Brest was liberated on July 28 after which the Front commander, Marshal K. K. Rokossovskii, directed his main forces along the Warsaw axis. During the night of August 1 the 8th Guards Army seized a bridgehead over the Vistula in the Magnuszew area. During the following days the main forces of the Army were ferried across and by the end of August 2 had expanded the bridgehead to 19km in width and up to 6km in depth. Through the rest of the month until August 28 the 8th Guards Army continued to expand its foothold in cooperation with the 69th Army at Puławy, repelling numerous German tank and infantry counterattacks and eventually reaching the mouth of the Pilica River. The next day the STAVKA ordered the Army to go over to the defensive.

== Into Poland ==
The 88th Guards remained in the Magnuszew bridgehead into January, 1945 with the rest of its Corps and Army. In the plan for the Vistula-Oder operation the 8th Guards was assigned a breakthrough front 7km wide and had 250 guns and mortars per kilometre of this front. It was to break through the German defense between Matyldzin and Chmeilnik with the objective of launching an attack toward Jedlińsk and Radom on the second day. The 1st Guards Tank Army would be committed on the third day and lead the 8th Guards to the intermediate goal of the fortified city of Poznań which was to be reached by the third week.

1st Belorussian Front began its breakout from the Magnuszew and Puławy bridgeheads at 0855 hours on January 14 following a 25-minute artillery onslaught from all the Front's artillery. The 88th Guards had formed a special assault battalion in common with the rest of the first echelon divisions and these quickly captured up to four lines of German trenches. The division's main forces, supported by a double rolling barrage, took advantage of this success, broke through the main defensive zone and advanced 12-13km during the day. The offensive developed successfully overnight and into January 15 despite the arrival of XXXX Panzer Corps. 1st Guards Tank was committed early and pushed the German force back to the west with heavy losses, after which the Soviet armies went over to the pursuit. In recognition of the 88th Guards' leading role in the breakout from the Magnuszew bridgehead, on February 19 its 269th and 271st Guards Rifle Regiments, plus the 194th Guards Artillery Regiment, would be awarded the Order of the Red Banner while the 266th Guards Rifle Regiment received the Order of Suvorov, 3rd Degree. On the same date the 96th Guards Antitank Battalion was granted the Order of the Red Star for its part in the fighting for the city of Włocławek and nearby towns.

During the breakout battle Jr. Lt. Ivan Sergeevich Yolkin distinguished himself on the path to becoming a Hero of the Soviet Union. Near the village of Tsitselyuvka, 20km northeast of Radom, Yolkin's rifle platoon of the 266th Guards Regiment was the first to break into the German trenches. During a subsequent counterattack he knocked out a self-propelled gun with a grenade, then led his platoon back to the attack during which it accounted for over 80 German officers and men plus a battery of artillery. On January 25 Yolkin led his platoon across the Warta River 15km north of Poznań; after establishing himself with two of his guardsmen on the west bank they provided covering fire for the rest of the unit to cross. Yolkin was awarded his Gold Star on March 24. He survived the war and continued to serve in the Soviet Army, reaching the rank of lieutenant colonel before moving to the reserve in 1970. He later retired to Grodno and died on April 3, 1991.

=== Battle for Poznań ===
During January 18-19 the 8th Guards Army advanced up to 55km and with the assistance of the 11th and 9th Tank Corps liberated the city of Łódź; for its part in this victory the 269th Guards Rifle Regiment (Lt. Col. Kozyarenko, Ivan Petrovich) would receive its name as an honorific. Despite the appearance of German reserves the advance of 1st Belorussian Front reached the Poznań defensive line late on January 22 and the city was blockaded by 1st Guards Tank Army on January 24. On January 26 the Front commander, Marshal G. K. Zhukov, delivered a plan to the STAVKA that called for the 8th Guards Army to reach the Oder within a week and force a crossing in the Küstrin area. However an initial attempt by the 1st Guards and 2nd Guards Tank Armies to take Poznań from the march failed and, with a garrison of 60,000 men, it would clearly be a hard nut to crack. Elements of 8th Guards Army, including the 39th Guards Division, took over most of 1st Guards Tank's sector of the blockade late on January 25 while the 79th and 88th Guards advanced on Küstrin.

=== Battle for the Küstrin Bridgehead ===
The advance on Küstrin was led by the 5th Shock Army which began arriving on the east bank of the Oder River on January 31. The previous day Zhukov had issued orders to bounce the river and take Berlin with a swift rush by mid-February. The forward detachments of this Army crossed the fragile ice on the river and soon established a bridgehead 4km wide and 3km deep near the town of Kienitz. As German reserves gathered to contain and eliminate this and other bridgeheads the 79th and 88th Guards arrived along the river on February 3 and took over a small bridgehead south of Küstrin, in conjunction with 4th Guards Rifle Corps, that had been established by the 1st Guards Tank Army. Over the next few days this foothold was expanded until it was 10km wide and between 2-4km deep. The commander of the 266th Guards Rifle Regiment, Lt. Col. Ivan Petrovich Subbotin, helped lead the defense of the bridgehead against the subsequent German counterattacks. In the process his soldiers caused significant casualties and destroyed many vehicles and other equipment. Despite being wounded on February 9 Subbotin carried on in command until nightfall before agreeing to be evacuated. After returning from hospital he continued to lead his regiment during the Berlin operation. On March 24 he was made a Hero of the Soviet Union. He continued to serve in the Soviet Army after the war in several staff positions and was transferred to the reserve in 1973. He died at Rostov-na-Donu on August 26, 1980.

== Into Berlin ==
On March 17 Maj. Gen. Dmitrii Ivanovich Stankevskii took command of the division until General Pankov returned on March 22. Pankov would also be made a Hero of the Soviet Union prior to the Berlin operation, on April 6.

The final offensive on the German capital began on April 16. After breaking out of the Küstrin bridgehead the units of 8th Guards Army were tasked with seizing the Seelow Heights on the west bank of the Oder. The Army was deployed along an 18km front from Golzow to Podelzig but its main attack would be made on a 7km-wide front from Golzow to Sachsendorf. The 4th Guards and 29th Guards Corps would make the main attack while the 28th Guards Corps covered the remainder of the front with the 79th and 88th Guards in the first echelon and 39th Guards in second. Within the Army the rifle regiments organized their battalions in a single echelon with the companies stacked in three lines. At this stage of the war, in common with most rifle divisions of its Front, the 88th Guards had roughly 5,200 personnel on strength.

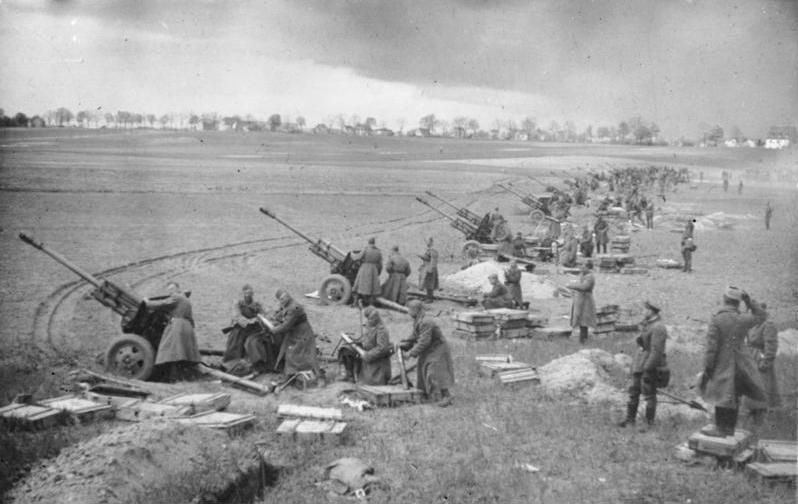
Soviet divisional artillery supporting the attack on Berlin

The offensive from the Küstrin bridgehead was preceded by a reconnaissance-in-force on April 14-15 to determine the main German defense zone along the bridgehead and to seize various sectors of forward trenches. This effort was supported by a significant amount of artillery and aviation. On the first day the main part of 28th Guards Corps' reconnaissance was carried out by the 79th Guards. In addition to uncovering and compromising parts of the German defense the thickest zone of minefields had been neutralized and the German command became uncertain of the timing of the main offensive.

=== Battle for the Seelow Heights ===
8th Guards Army attacked at 0525 hours on April 16 following a 25-minute artillery preparation with 51 searchlights. Having crushed the fire resistance of the defenders and beaten off several counterattacks the Army advanced 3-6km, having broken through the main defensive zone and capturing 600 prisoners. Forward brigades of 1st Guards Tank Army began following the infantry at 0700 hours and together they reached the powerful German second defensive zone along the Seelow Heights at noon. This position was occupied by part of the forces of the 20th Panzergrenadier and 303rd Infantry Divisions, which had fallen back from the main defensive zone, as well as Panzer Division Müncheberg which had been committed from the reserve. The antitank defense of the Heights was substantially reinforced with antiaircraft artillery from the Berlin zone.

Following a 15-minute artillery preparation 8th Guards Army attacked the Heights but was met by heavy fire. Repeated attempts by the Army's units, backed by brigades of 1st Guards Tank Army, failed to break through. 28th Guards Corps, still with the 88th and 79th Guards up and the 39th Guards back, along with three brigades of the 8th Guards Mechanized Corps, was soon fighting along the eastern slopes of heights 53.2 and 58.9 and near marker 10.8. The most stubborn defense was put up along the paved road from Seelow to Müncheberg where nearly 100 88mm guns were positioned. It was soon clear that a regrouping of the artillery and the conduct of a new artillery and air preparation would be necessary to break this line. Marshal Zhukov ordered the offensive to be continued during the night.

The battle on April 17 began with a 30-minute artillery preparation beginning at 1000 hours. The assault was met with stubborn resistance and counterattacks supported by groups of 10-12 tanks. At noon the 57th Guards Rifle Division captured the town of Seelow. 28th Guards Corps, still operating in its previous combat formation along with 8th Guards Mechanized, took the strongpoint in front of Dolgelin and by the end of the day had arrived at the western and southwestern outskirts of the town itself for a total advance of 1-3km. 8th Guards Army resumed its offensive at 0700 hours the next day following a short artillery preparation. It was facing fresh reserves east of Müncheberg including the 23rd SS Division "Nederland" which undertook 14 counterattacks by infantry and tanks. Faced with five of these the 28th Guards Corps was forced to fight along its previous line, with its right flank managing to gain only 500-1,000m during the day. The Corps also faced difficult and hilly terrain cut by a large number of lakes and channels.

By the night of April 18/19 Zhukov was becoming concerned that the offensive was being conducted too slowly and could die out. In consequence he issued orders to improve organization and the quality of troop control. After a pause for reorganization and replenishment of ammunition the offensive would resume at noon with an artillery preparation along the entire front. Meanwhile, the German command moved further reserves into their third defensive zone including large numbers of Volkssturm. The primary objective for 8th Guards Army was Müncheberg which was still blocking the road to Berlin. Following a 30-minute artillery preparation the 4th Guards Corps attacked at 1230 hours, followed an hour later by the 29th and 28th Guards Corps. The town was taken by the 29th Guards Corps during the afternoon while the 28th Guards Corps, still struggling with the terrain and heavy counterattacks, gained only 1,000m, ending the day along a line from Neuentempel to Neu Malisch with its front facing southwest.

=== Into the City ===
German resistance to 8th Guards Army in the third defense zone continued on April 20 as some of the rest of 1st Belorussian Front began reaching the outskirts of Berlin proper. The 79th Guards cleared the woods east of Belendorf and by the end of the day the main forces of 28th Guards Corps had concentrated in the Eggersdorf area. This helped complete the breakthrough of the third zone. The next day the Army, along with 1st Guards Tank Army, was involved in stubborn fighting along the city's outer defensive line. 28th Guards Corps, still working with 8th Guards Mechanized Corps, attacked in the continuous wooded area southeast of Kalkberg and after heavy fighting reached the Kalksee and the eastern outskirts of Erkner, making an advance of 15km during the day.

The two armies continued attacking through the night and by noon on April 22 had taken the Berlin suburbs of Hoppegarten, Fichtenau and Rahnsdorf. The offensive continued through the afternoon, breaking through the city's inner defensive line along a sector from Mahlsdorf to Wendenschloss with a total advance of 10km to the west. By now all the armies of 1st Belorussian Front's main shock group were fighting in the streets of Berlin. The following day the 8th Guards and 1st Guards Tanks were attacking into the southeastern part of the city. 28th Guards Corps, having forced the Dahme River, by the end of the day was fighting with two of its divisions for Altglienicke and Bohnsdorf, having advanced 3km. Overnight the Corps, backed by 8th Guards Mechanized, completely cleared the two districts. The mission of the two armies on April 24 remained as before as the encirclement of Berlin became imminent. During the morning the 28th Guards and 8th Guards Mechanized developed the offensive westward and at 1030 hours linked up with 1st Ukrainian Front's 71st Mechanized Brigade west of Bohnsdorf. Following this the 11th Guards Tank Corps was transferred to the 28th Guards' offensive sector, crossing the Dahme at the 8th Guards Mechanized's crossings; following this the 28th and 29th Guards Corps with the two mobile corps attacked to the northwest and by the day's end had taken the districts of Rudow, Buckow and Britz and had reached the southern shore of the Teltow Canal.

=== Battle for the City Center ===
General Chuikov was ordered to develop his Army's offensive on April 25 to the northwest in the general direction of the Tiergarten, still in cooperation with 1st Guards Tank Army. After a short but powerful barrage the offensive was resumed at 0800 hours. At noon the encirclement of the entire German group of forces in Berlin was completed. Despite stubborn resistance, during the day the two armies forced the Teltow Canal, occupied more than 50 city blocks, and on the left flank reached Tempelhof Airport.

The next day the two armies were tasked with capturing the area of the airport and the nearby central railroad marshalling yards. They were facing the remnants of Panzer Division Müncheberg and 11th SS Panzergrenadier Division Nordland along with several battalions of Volkssturm. The 28th Guards Corps forced its sector of the Teltow Canal and captured the parks adjacent to the eastern part of Tempelhof while the 29th Guards Corps took the airport itself. During April 27 the 8th Guards Army was reaching out to establish contact with 3rd Shock Army in the Tiergarten area, which would split the German forces in the central city. It attacked vigorously to the northwest along the south bank of the Landwehr Canal and by the end of the day the 28th Guards Corps had advanced 3km, taken the southern part of the marshalling yards, and was fighting along a line from Großgörschenstrasse to the railroad triangle in the area of Torgauerstrasse.

Chuikov assigned the 4th Guards and 29th Guards Corps the task of reaching the area of the Reichstag on April 28 and while these advanced 1,000-1,500m with the bulk of the Army's artillery support the 28th Guards Corps made only limited gains and by day's end was fighting in the northeastern part of Schöneberg. Overnight the 88th Guards and 79th Guards came under command of 1st Guards Tank Army and during the day continued attacking westward along the south bank of the Landwehr Canal in tandem with 8th Guards Mechanized Corps. Together the two divisions and the Corps seized 50 city blocks, advanced 1.5km and reached a line from Lützowplatz to Wittenbergplatz to the intersection of Motzstrasse and Hohenstaufenstrasse.

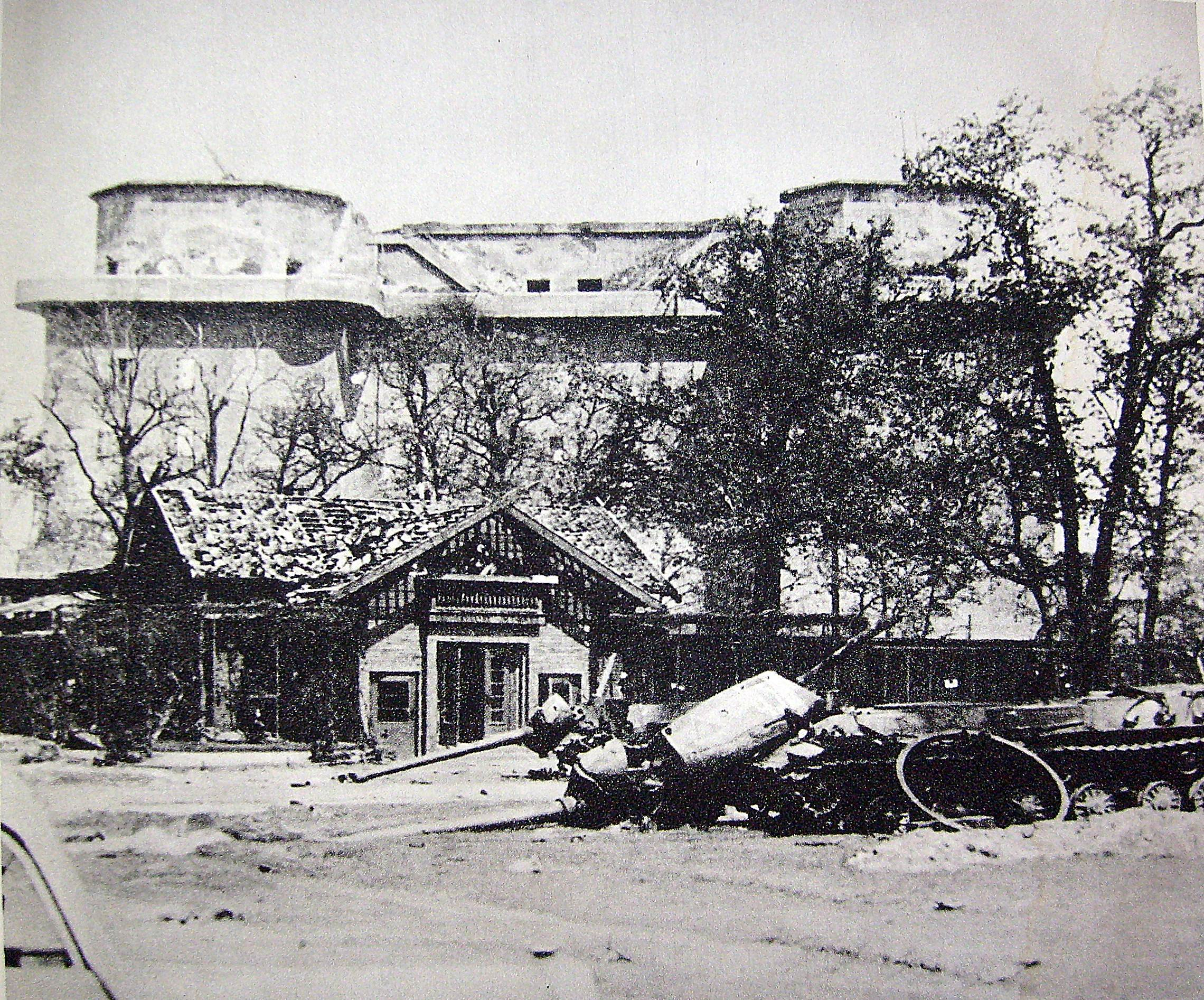
The Berlin Zoo flak tower in May 1945. Destroyed IS tank in the foreground.

As the 79th Rifle Corps of 3rd Shock Army fought for the Reichstag on April 30 the 28th Guards Corps attacked to meet the 2nd Guards Tank Army in the area of the Zoological Garden, which also contained the Zoo flak tower. During the morning the 39th Guards reached the Budapesterstrasse with the 88th Guards to its left along the same street near the southwestern part of the Zoo. The Zoo was defended by a garrison of about 5,000 men of various units with five tanks and a large number of artillery pieces. It was also heavily fortified with bunkers, stone buildings and concrete barricades. Several methods were tried to overcome the reinforced concrete bunkers, including direct fire from guns as large as 152mm calibre at ranges from 200-300m, but it required engineers blocking firing apertures and undermining entranceways to gain success. Over 3,000 prisoners were taken and the next day the entire Zoo was cleared.

By the evening of April 30 the 8th Guards Army's forward units were located 600-800m from the Reich Chancellery. Just before midnight a German envoy reached the forward lines of the 35th Guards Rifle Division's 102nd Guards Rifle Regiment near the Potsdam Station; this would lead to surrender talks between Gen. of Inf. H. Krebs and General Chuikov at 0330 hours on May 1. Despite this fighting continued in the city centre during the day. 28th Guards Corps, again in tandem with 8th Guards Mechanized, reached the racetrack and established direct communications with 2nd Guards Tanks, isolating the remnants of the German Tiergarten grouping defending in the Halensee area. At 0040 hours on May 2 the signal battalion of 79th Guards Division picked up a radio message in Russian from the LVI Panzer Corps headquarters requesting a ceasefire. By 1500 hours the resistance of the Berlin garrison had completely ceased.

== Postwar ==
On May 2 three of the division's regiments were awarded honorifics:

BERLIN... 266th Guards Rifle Regiment (Lt. Colonel Subbotin, Ivan Petrovich)... 271st Guards Rifle Regiment (Lt. Colonel Vishnyakov, Dmitrii Arkadevich)... 194th Guards Artillery Regiment (Lt. Colonel Spas, Mikhail Ivanovich)... The troops who participated in the capture of Berlin, by the order of the Supreme High Command of 2 May, 1945, and a commendation in Moscow, are given a salute of 24 artillery salvoes from 324 guns.

The division as whole was awarded the Order of Lenin on May 28 for its contributions to the breakthrough of the defenses east of the German capital. In a final round of awards on June 11 the 269th Guards Rifle Regiment was given the Order of Suvorov, 3rd Degree, the 102nd Guards Sapper Battalion won the Order of Aleksandr Nevsky and the 157th Guards Signal Battalion was presented with the Order of the Red Star, all for their roles in the battle for Berlin.

According to STAVKA Order No. 11095 of May 29, part 2, the 88th Guards is listed as one of the rifle divisions to be retained as part of the occupation force. On June 9 the division, along with the rest of 8th Guards Army, was assigned to the Group of Soviet Forces in Germany. In January 1946 it came under the command of Maj. Gen. Grigorii Semyonovich Kolchanov, who was replaced in August by Maj. Gen. Pyotr Yosifovich Zalizyuk. Despite its highly distinguished record the 88th Guards was disbanded in 1947.
