= Chebudasy =

Village in Mordovia, Russia

Coordinates: 54°33′49″N 45°58′05″E

Chebudasy is a village in Atyashevsky District, Mordovia, Russia. The village is under the administration of the Bolshemanadyshsky rural settlement.

== Geography ==
The village is located on the Vecherley river.

== History ==
Chebudasy was mentioned in the 1863 list of settlements of Simbirsk Governorate, part of Ardatovsky Uyezd. At the time it included 43 homesteads.

== Demographics ==
The village had a population of 141 in 2002 which declined to 133 in 2010. According to the 2002 census, the village was 89 percent Russian.
