= 409th Rifle Division =

409th Rifle Division (August 19, 1941 – July 1945)
- Active: 1941–1945
- Country: Soviet Union
- Branch: Red Army
- Type: Division
- Role: Infantry
- Engagements: Battle of the Caucasus; Kuban Bridgehead; Donbas strategic offensive Battle of the Dniepr; Kirovograd Offensive; Uman–Botoșani Offensive; First Jassy-Kishinev Offensive; Second Jassy-Kishinev Offensive; Budapest Offensive; Vienna Offensive
- Decorations: Order of Bogdan Khmelnitsky
- Battle honours: Kirovograd

Commanders
- Notable commanders: Col. Artashes Arshakovich Vasilyan; Kombrig Mikhail Ivanovich Zaporozhchenko; Col. Vasilii Fedorovich Gladkov; Col. Mikhail Ignatevich Dobrovolskii; Col. Gavriil Stepanovich Sorokin; Maj. Gen. Evstafii Petrovich Grechanyi

The 409th Rifle Division was as an infantry division of the Red Army from 1941 to 1945. It fought against the German invasion, Operation Barbarossa. It was officially considered an Armenian National division, and initially almost all its personnel were of that nationality. After forming it remained in service along the border with Turkey until nearly the end of 1942, when it was redeployed to the 44th Army in Transcaucasus Front, assisting in driving the German 17th Army into the Kuban peninsula. Following this the division was moved to the 46th Army in Southwestern Front and took part in the summer offensive through the Donbas and eastern Ukraine. In October it was moved again, now to the 57th Army in 2nd Ukrainian Front; it would remain in that Front for the duration of the war, moving to the 7th Guards Army in December. After crossing the Dniepr the 409th won a battle honor in January, 1944, then spent the spring and summer in the battles around Jassy and Kishenev in Moldova. After the defeat of Romania the division advanced into Hungary as part of the 27th Guards Rifle Corps. In October it rejoined the 7th Guards Army, where it remained for the duration, mostly in the 25th Guards Rifle Corps. After the fall of Budapest the division joined the final advances on Vienna and Prague in the spring of 1945, and was disbanded shortly thereafter.

== Formation ==
The 409th Rifle Division began forming on August 19, 1941, at Stepanavan in the Transcaucasus Military District along with its "sister" 408th Rifle Division nearby. Its order of battle, based on the first wartime shtat (table of organization and equipment) for rifle divisions, was as follows:

- 675th Rifle Regiment
- 677th Rifle Regiment
- 684th Rifle Regiment
- 964th Artillery Regiment
- 196th Antitank Battalion
- 192nd Antiaircraft Battery (later 688th Antiaircraft Battalion until July 1, 1943)
- 463rd Reconnaissance Company
- 682nd Sapper Battalion
- 852nd Signal Battalion (later 784th Signal Company)
- 486th Medical/Sanitation Battalion
- 479th Chemical Protection (Anti-gas) Company
- 344th Motor Transport Company
- 251st Field Bakery
- 826th Divisional Veterinary Hospital (later 409th)
- 1460th Field Postal Station
- 731st Field Office of the State Bank

Col. Artashes Arshakovich Vasilyan was appointed to command of the division on the day it began forming. That month it was noted that 95 percent of its personnel were Armenian, in contrast to its "sister" 408th which had nearly 80 percent non-Armenian. For well over the entire first year of its service, the 409th was in 45th Army along the border with Turkey. On February 3, 1942, Kombrig Mikhail Ivanovich Zaporozhchenko took command of the division from Colonel Vasilyan, but the latter returned to command on July 15. Shortly before the 409th moved to the fighting front, Vasilyan handed the unit over to Col. Vasilii Fedorovich Gladkov.

== Kuban, Donbas, and Ukraine ==
In December the division was moved to 44th Army in Lt. Gen. Ivan Maslennikov's Northern Group of Forces in Transcaucasus Front. By the beginning of January, 1943, with the destruction of German 6th Army at Stalingrad imminent, Army Group A was forced to fall back from the positions it had taken in the Caucasus region during the previous summer and fall. The Northern Group was in the Grozny and Taman sector and set out in pursuit when 1st Panzer Army began its retreat on January 1. The German command planned to fall back only as far as the Kuma River, but this could not be held and Maslennikov's forward detachments were over it in force on January 10. Meanwhile, the Soviet Southern Front was advancing towards the Manych River, threatening Army Group A's supply line through Rostov. In the event the 4th Panzer Army was able to hold this line long enough for 1st Panzer Army to escape, while 17th Army fell back to the Kuban bridgehead.

On January 18 Colonel Gladkov had handed command of the 409th to Col. Mikhail Ignatevich Dobrovolskii. By the beginning of February the division had been moved to the 37th Army in what was now called the North Caucasus Front, where it engaged in mostly fruitless fighting against the heavily fortified bridgehead. In March it was removed to the Reserve of the Supreme High Command and sent north. When the summer campaign began in July the division was part of the 46th Army in Southwestern Front. As of the beginning of August the 409th was back in the Reserve of the Supreme High Command with 46th Army, returning that month to Southwestern Front, then to Steppe Front in September. Steppe Front would be renamed 2nd Ukrainian Front on October 20, and the division would remain in this front for the duration of the war. During October it was reassigned to the 64th Rifle Corps in 57th Army. By the end of 1943, after five months of almost continuous offensive combat, the division had a total strength of 2,947 officers and men, armed with 1,424 rifles, 483 sub-machine guns, 11 heavy machine guns, 36 light machine guns, 30 antitank rifles, 23 mortars and 21 artillery pieces of all calibres.

=== Kirovograd Offensive ===
In December the 409th was moved to the 25th Guards Rifle Corps of 7th Guards Army. It would be part of that Army for most of the rest of the war, apart from those periods when it was serving as a separate rifle division directly under Front control. On December 5 Colonel Dobrovolskii was succeeded in command by Col. Gavriil Stepanovich Sorokin. On January 3, 1944 the 2nd Ukrainian Front began a new offensive against German 8th Army in the great bend west of the Dniepr River, aimed at Kirovograd. On January 8 the city was liberated, and the division was awarded a battle honor:

"KIROVOGRAD"... 409th Rifle Division (Colonel Sorokin, Gavriil Stepanovich)... The troops who participated in the liberation of Kirovograd, by the order of the Supreme High Command of 8 January 1944, and a commendation in Moscow, are given a salute of 20 artillery salvoes from 224 guns.

On February 7, in a final change of command, Colonel Sorokin was replaced by Maj. Gen. Evstafii Petrovich Grechanyi. During the westward advance from Kirovograd the division was recognized for its part in the liberation of Novoukrainka with the award of the Order of Bogdan Khmelnitsky, 2nd Degree, on March 29.

== Jassy-Kishinev Offensives ==
As of the start of April the 409th was serving as a separate rifle division in the reserves of the Front. A month later it had been joined with the 297th Rifle Division in the 27th Guards Rifle Corps, still in the reserve. Due to its reserve status the division saw little, if any, combat in the early stages of the first Jassy-Kishinev offensive, but in the last days of May the German 8th Army began a counteroffensive against the 52nd Army north of Iași which they codenamed Operation "Sonja". This made significant gains over two days and the Front commander, Marshal Ivan Konev, ordered the 27th Guards Corps to reinforce the adjacent 27th Army. This proved timely as the 8th Army launched its Operation "Katja" with four panzer and three infantry divisions against that Army's positions northwest of Iași on June 2. This powerful force was facing three weak rifle divisions and about 50 tanks of 2nd Tank Army. The arrival of 27th Guards and 35th Rifle Corps would tip the balance of forces in Soviet favor, but this would take from two to five days.

Overnight on June 4/5 the 409th arrived at the front, taking up positions between the remnants of the 202nd Rifle Division at Epureni and the 337th Rifle Division at Tipilesti, facing elements of the Großdeutschland Panzergrenadier Division and the Romanian 18th Mountain Division. In the morning the panzergrenadiers reached the southern approaches to Tipilesti but faltered in the face of the 409th's resistance, backed by the remainder of the 3rd Tank Corps. After further fighting on the following day the German offensive went into a lull which was followed by a Soviet counterattack on June 7 south of Epureni involving the division which drove part of Großdeutschland back and convinced the German command to go over to the defensive. The fighting front remained quiet until late August.

=== Second Jassy-Kishinev Offensive ===
At the beginning of August the 409th was still in 27th Guards Corps, with the 297th and 214th Rifle Divisions, and was in the second echelon behind the 7th Guards and 27th Armies between the Seret and Prut Rivers. According to the plan of the offensive the Corps was to be prepared to operate in the zone of either of these Armies. For the artillery preparation when the offensive began on August 20 all the Corps' artillery, including that of the 409th and the other divisions, was used in support of 27th Army, specifically the 206th Rifle and 4th Guards Airborne Divisions in the first echelon. In the event the offensive unfolded so successfully that 27th Guards Corps remained in Front reserve until the end of the operation and through August 25–27 was employed in clearing the central part of the Mare ridge of roaming groups of defeated German and Romanian troops. In the last days of the month there was one remaining major group of German forces in the rear of 2nd Ukrainian Front, and the Corps was brought in to secure the road from Roman to Bacău to Adzud Nou. This grouping was eliminated in the Bacău area during September 2–3.

== Into the Balkans ==
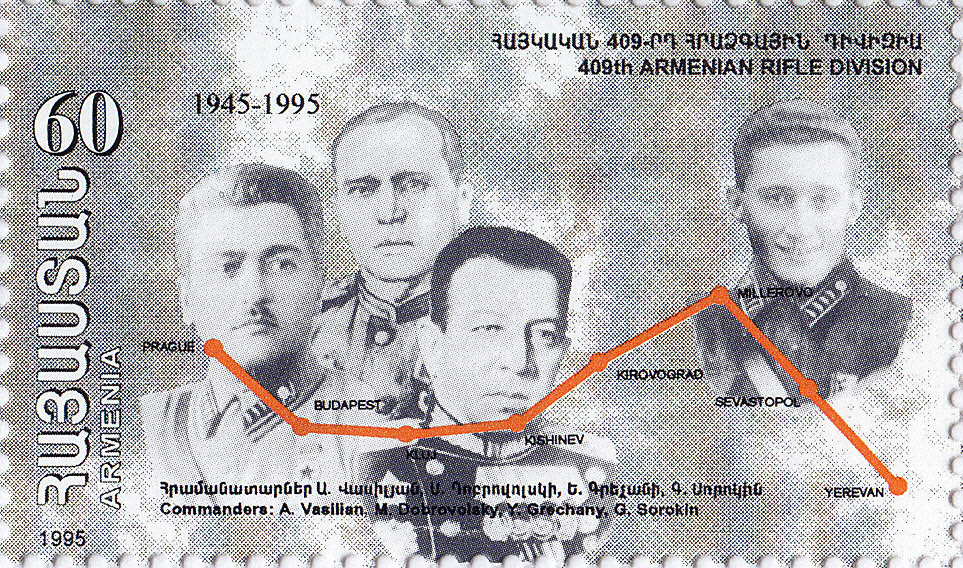
1995 Armenian postage stamp of the combat path and commanders of the 409th. Credit user Mchpv.

As of October 28 the 409th was back in the 7th Guards Army as a separate rifle division. It would remain in this Army for the duration of the war. During the first attack against the German/Hungarian Budapest group of forces the Army reached the line from Kőtelek to Újszász to Albertirsa. The second attack began on November 11 and the 409th was supported by the 27th Guards Tank Brigade in its push on Újszász and Jászberény. This stepped off at 0850 hours after a 20 minute artillery barrage and by the end of the next day the 27th Guards Tank and the 4th Guards Mechanized Corps reached the latter town but were unable to take it from the march. On November 14 the division, in cooperation with the 227th and 303rd Rifle Divisions, was able to penetrate into its southern suburbs. The advance continued until November 26, gaining 60–80 km in bitter fighting through marshy, difficult terrain. In preparation of the offensive on Budapest itself the division's artillery was assigned to add its weight to the preparatory bombardment ahead of the 25th Guards Rifle Corps. The offensive began at 1045 hours on December 5 following the artillery preparation which successfully suppressed the German firing points and by the end of December 9 the 7th Guards had reached a line from Nandor to Borsosberenke to the left bank of the Danube in the Verőce area.

Before the end of the Siege of Budapest the 7th Guards Army was advancing towards Slovakia. The 409th was now back in the 25th Guards Rifle Corps. On the night of January 6, 1945, the 677th Rifle Regiment was taking part in the battle for the village of Bela, 36 km southeast of the town of Nové Zámky. In the course of the fighting a platoon commander of the 2nd Battalion, Jr. Lt. Alexei Fedorovich Lebedev, attempted to knock out a German machine-gun bunker with grenades. When this failed he blocked the embrasure with his body, allowing his men to carry on the attack. In recognition of his sacrifice, Lebedev was posthumously made a Hero of the Soviet Union on April 28.

== Postwar ==
The division ended the war near Prague, once again in the 27th Guards Rifle Corps. At this time its men and women shared the official title of 409th Rifle, Kirovograd, Order of Bogdan Khmelnitsky Division. (Russian: 409-я стрелковая Кировоградская ордена Богдана Хмельницкого дивизия.) According to Stavka Order No. 11096 of May 29, part 8, the division was listed to be disbanded in place. In accordance to this directive the division was disbanded in July.
