= Horlești =

- Commune
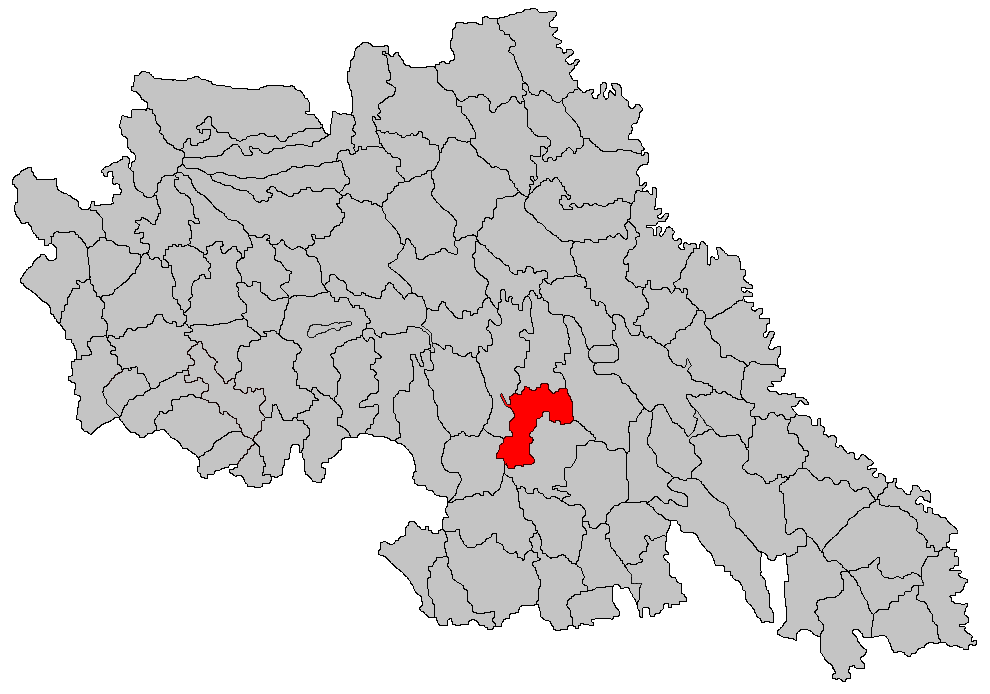
- Location in Iași County

- Location in Romania
- Coordinates: 47°06′20″N 27°22′25″E
- Country: Romania
- County: Iași
- Subdivisions: Horlești, Bogdănești, Scoposeni

Government
  - Mayor (2024–2028): Mihai Cadar (PNL)
- Area: 50.87 km^{2} (19.64 sq mi)
- Elevation: 118 m (387 ft)
- Population (2021-12-01): 2,529
  - Density: 50/km^{2} (130/sq mi)
- Time zone: EET/EEST (UTC+2/+3)
- Postal code: 707260
- Area code: +40 x32
- Vehicle reg.: IS
- Website: primariahorlesti.ro

Horlești is a commune in Iași County, Western Moldavia, Romania. It is composed of three villages: Bogdănești, Horlești and Scoposeni.

At the 2002 census, 100% of inhabitants were ethnic Romanians. 60.4% were Romanian Orthodox, 39% Roman Catholic and 0.6% Seventh-day Adventist.
