= 157th Rifle Division =

157th Rifle Division (August 19, 1939 – March 1, 1943) 157th Rifle Division (May 21, 1943 – February 1946)
- Active: 1939–1946
- Country: Soviet Union
- Branch: Red Army
- Type: Infantry
- Size: Division
- Engagements: Siege of Odessa; Crimean campaign Battle of the Kerch Peninsula; Battle of Stalingrad; Operation Uranus; Operation Ring; Smolensk operation Orsha offensives (1943); Operation Bagration; Minsk offensive Vilnius offensive Kaunas offensive Gumbinnen Operation; East Prussian offensive Heiligenbeil Pocket; Soviet invasion of Manchuria; Harbin–Kirin Operation
- Decorations: Order of Suvorov; Order of Kutuzov (both 2nd Formation)
- Battle honours: Neman (2nd Formation)

Commanders
- Notable commanders: Col. Vasilii Vasilevich Glagolev; Col. Dmitrii Ivanovich Tomilov; Col. Dmitrii Semyonovich Kuropatenko; Col. Aleksandr Vasilevich Kirsanov; Col. Dmitrii Ivanovich Golubev; Col. Grigorii Kondratevich Zaitsev; Col. Aleksandr Efimovich Vinogradov; Col. Aleksandr Aleksandrovich Shchennikov; Col. Vasilii Aleksandrovich Katyushin; Col. Nikolai Fyodorovich Kusakin

The 157th Rifle Division was first formed as an infantry division of the Red Army in August 1939 in the North Caucasus Military District, based on the shtat (table of organization and equipment) that would become official the following month. It was still in that District when the German invasion began in June 1941. It entered the fighting in September when it was shipped to reinforce the Separate Coastal Army defending the port of Odesa. After taking part in several actions it was evacuated to Sevastopol and soon went into battle again in a last-ditch effort to prevent German 11th Army from overrunning the Crimea. This failed, and the 157th was forced to trek through the Crimean Mountains to reach Sevastopol, from where it was evacuated back to the Caucasus. At the end of December its 633rd Rifle Regiment formed part of the assault landing force that retook the port of Feodosia and caused the local German corps commander to evacuate the Kerch Peninsula. A German counterattack recaptured the port within weeks, and the front line eventually settled along the Parpach Isthmus until May when a new offensive threw the 157th and the rest of its Front out of Crimea. After a brief rest back in the North Caucasus the division was ordered north to the Don River as the German summer offensive pushed into the Caucasus steppe. Retreating to the east it moved to 64th Army in Southeastern Front in August, fighting against 4th Panzer Army on the southern approaches to Stalingrad. It fell back to the so-called Beketovka bridgehead over the Volga south of the city and remained there until the start of the Red Army counteroffensive in November. As part of Stalingrad Front it advanced westward before coming up against German positions on the southern edge of what was now the Stalingrad Kessel (Pocket). In the last days of Operation Ring in January 1943 the 157th pushed into the southern part of the city where it recaptured the grain elevator that had been lost in September. Before the German surrender it was removed for redeployment elsewhere, and on March 1 it became the 76th Guards Rifle Division.

A new 157th was formed in the Moscow Military District in May 1943, based on a pair of rifle brigades, one of which had no combat experience. As it formed it came under command of 68th Army in the Reserve of the Supreme High Command but the Army was assigned to Western Front in July, prior to the start of the summer offensive toward Smolensk. During the course of this operation it was reassigned to 33rd Army, and then to 21st Army in late September. It briefly returned to the 68th until that Army was disbanded in early November, then moved to 5th Army and back to the 33rd as the Front shuffled its forces in its futile efforts to liberate Orsha. It then turned its attentions to cutting off the forces of 3rd Panzer Army in and around Vitebsk, but in difficult fighting through the winter of 1943-44 this proved equally futile. When Western Front was disbanded in the spring the 33rd was assigned to the new 2nd Belorussian Front. At the outset of Operation Bagration the 157th was employed as the infantry component of a special mobile group which served as the vanguard of the Front in the liberation of Mogilev. During the pursuit of the defeated Army Group Center it moved with its Army to 3rd Belorussian Front and was under these commands when it won a battle honor for the battles near Kaunas and across the Neman River. Following the abortive Gumbinnen operation into East Prussia the division returned to 5th Army, and it would remain under this command into the postwar. During the Vistula-Oder offensive in January 1945 the 157th distinguished itself in finally penetrating the East Prussian defenses and was awarded the Order of Kutuzov, while several of its subunits also received decorations during this operation. During April the division saw action in clearing Samland, then loaded on trains as part of the Reserve of the Supreme High Command, moving across the USSR to take part in the invasion of Manchuria. It received the Order of Suvorov following this operation, and remained in the far east until July 1946, when it was converted to a coastal defense unit.

== 1st Formation ==
The 157th began forming on August 19, 1939, in the North Caucasus Military District, based on a rifle regiment from the 74th Taman Rifle Division. At the outbreak of war it was moved to Taman and began constructing defenses on the Black Sea coast. At this time its order of battle was as follows:

- 384th Rifle Regiment
- 633rd Rifle Regiment
- 716th Rifle Regiment
- 85th Light Artillery Regiment (later 422nd Artillery Regiment)
- 212th Antitank Battalion
- 175th Antiaircraft Battery (later 272nd Antiaircraft Battalion)
- 141st Reconnaissance Battalion [including 15 light tanks] (later 190th Reconnaissance Company)
- 150th Sapper Battalion
- 199th Signal Battalion
- 133rd Medical/Sanitation Battalion (later 152nd)
- 149th Chemical Defense (Anti-gas) Company
- 124th Motor Transport Company
- 367th Field Bakery
- 157th Divisional Veterinary Hospital
- 492nd Field Postal Station
- 217th Field Office of the State Bank

Col. Vasilii Vasilevich Glagolev had been appointed to command on the day the division began forming. He had previously led the 76th Cavalry Regiment and most recently had served as chief of staff of the 12th Cavalry Division. On August 15 he was moved to command of the 42nd Cavalry Division and was succeeded by Col. Dmitrii Ivanovich Tomilov. Glagolev would later lead four different armies during the war, rising to the rank of colonel general, and was made chief of Soviet Airborne Forces postwar. Tomilov had previously been acting commander of the 86th Rifle Division and came to the 157th from the position of chief of the Combat Training Section, North Caucasus Military District.

== Siege of Odesa ==
By September 17 the division had reached a strength of 12,600 personnel, and on this date Tomilov received orders to prepare to move by sea to the besieged city of Odesa. As part of the invasion plan, Romanian 4th Army had been tasked with advancing into Ukraine, confronting and defeating Red Army forces west of the Southern Bug River, and capturing the city in a lightning strike. This offensive, in conjunction with Romanian 3rd and German 11th Armies, had begun on July 2 and gradually pushed back the Soviet 9th and 18th Armies until the line stabilized temporarily between the Prut and Dniestr Rivers. Gen. G. Nicolae Ciupercă's 4th Army, with 160,000 personnel, faced a daunting prospect as Odesa was heavily fortified with three lines of defense, and the STAVKA was determined to hold it. Eventually the 3rd Army would also have to be committed, along with German reinforcements. The Separate Coastal Army had been formed on July 9 to direct the defense, which began when the port was isolated on August 5; this Army would have to be reinforced and supplied by sea, but Romania had insufficient naval forces to interfere meaningfully. The 1st Armored Division struck the outer defenses on August 10 and came close to taking the city in one stroke, but Soviet reinforcements soon made its position untenable. Further assaults on August 16, 24, 28, and 30 were stopped cold, and General Ciupercă was sacked, being replaced by Gen. Iosif Iacobici. German reinforcements arrived, as did 15,000 Red Army personnel, and when the fighting resumed on September 12 the Romanians again took heavy losses to artillery fire and local counterattacks while gaining very little ground. From August 28 to September 11 the Romanian forces suffered 31,552 casualties, making a total of 58,859 since the start of the siege.

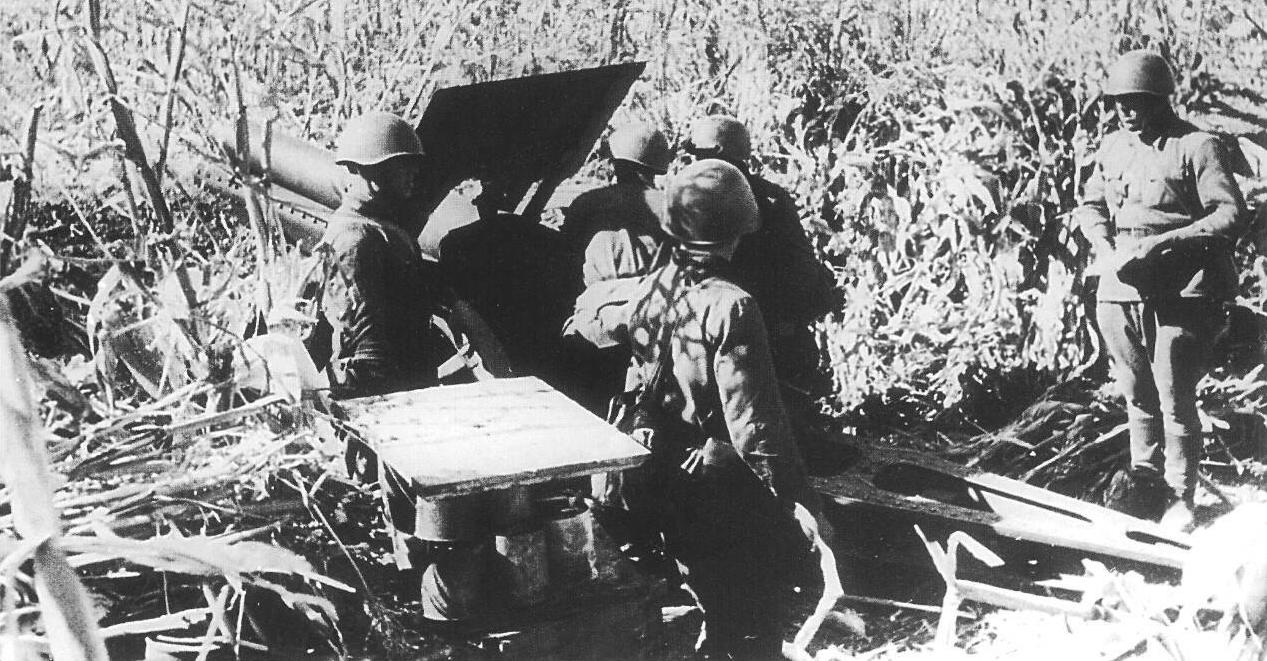
Soviet artillery firing near Odesa

The 157th began arriving from September 22 to 28, on transports escorted by the cruisers Krasny Krym, Krasny Kavkaz, Chervona Ukraina, and other warships. It went into action immediately in a combined operation with the 3rd Marine Brigade, which landed at Grigorievka and Chebanka in the rear of the 15th Infantry Division after a 30-minute bombardment from naval guns. This, plus a failed landing further to the east, drew off Romanian reserves. At 0640 hours on September 22 the leading regiment of the 157th attacked the 13th Infantry Division along the rail line from Odesa to Bierezovka. The 22nd Infantry Regiment was taken by surprise. The commander of one of its battalions was killed and his men panicked and fled to the southern outskirts of the village of Kubanka, unhinging the entire position of 5th Corps, leading to the retreat of the 15th Infantry as well. The advance of the 157th's regiment and the 3rd Marines was halted by the 5th Corps reserve of two battalions plus motorized units. The 13th Infantry lost 1,300 casualties, and 5th Corps' heavy artillery was pushed back out of range of the Odesa harbor area.

On September 29 German forces broke into the Crimea via the Isthmus of Perekop, and the STAVKA realised that Odesa would soon be untenable. Evacuation was first ordered for October 6, but was rescheduled for October 14. A diversionary attack was launched on October 2 on a 4 km-wide (2.5 mi) front by the 157th, the 25th Rifle Division, and the 2nd Cavalry Division against the sector of the Romanian lines held by the Frontier Guard Division and the left flank of the 6th Infantry Division after a powerful artillery preparation. The Red Army forces advanced along the road from Dalnik to Perselenet supported by tanks and aircraft. The sight of tanks caused two Romanian machine gun battalions and one battalion of Frontier Guards to retreat in disorder, but the 6th Infantry held firm. Romanian counterattacks on October 3–4 were able to restore the situation, but Coastal Army evacuated its first 86,000 troops in the meantime. A further Romanian attack on October 8/9 gained ground despite Soviet counterattacks with tanks. General Iacobici issued orders on October 12 for a general assault but two days later the Romanian General Staff noted increased activity by the Black Sea Fleet. Romanian patrols pushed forward on October 15, meeting heavy fire at first, but at 1030 hours the next day elements of the 7th Infantry Division entered the city. A total of some 350,000 soldiers and civilians had been evacuated, including the men of the 157th, which had begun to leave on October 3.

== Crimean campaigns ==
The division had been concentrated at Sevastopol by October 19, just as the situation in the Crimea was in crisis. 51st Army's position at Ishun had been broken by Gen. E. von Manstein's 11th Army, which was now in a position to overrun most of the peninsula. The first elements of the 157th were marching up from the port and the commander of 51st Army, Col. Gen. F. I. Kuznetsov, planned to throw them into an immediate counterattack against the salient held by the 73rd Infantry Division, alongside two dismounted cavalry divisions under his deputy, Lt. Gen. P. I. Batov. On the morning of October 20 two of the division's regiments, supported by 122mm howitzer fire, plus T-34s of the 5th Tank Regiment, struck Ishun from the southeast while Batov's troopers attacked from the southwest. The attack made progress at first and the 73rd was forced out of Ishun, fighting a delaying action. The 157th followed out into open ground and came under heavy artillery attack and air strikes. One bombing attack found Colonel Tomilov's command post, wounding him and much of his staff. This caused the attack to falter and the 73rd recaptured Ishun, forcing the 157th back to the Chatyrlyk River before heavy rain brought the fighting to a close. The following days saw continued skirmishing without significant gains by either side.

The loss of Ishun shocked the STAVKA and Kuznetsov was relieved of his command, being replaced by Batov. By October 24 the 25th and 95th Rifle Divisions had arrived from Odesa, the worse for wear from the fighting there. A new attack against the 73rd Infantry near Ishun went in without adequate artillery support and failed in the face of machine guns, mortars, and air attacks. A further effort the next day also suffered heavy losses and the German command, sensing weakness, committed the fresh 170th Infantry Division south of Ishun. This soon gained some 7 km (4.3 mi) against a collapsing Soviet front. 11th Army had the initiative and von Manstein released another division to push southward, as Coastal Army's forces began a withdrawal to Simferopol after taking 28,000 casualties in the Ishun fighting.

An improvised mobile force named Brigade Ziegler pursued the Coastal Army and reached the outskirts of Simferopol on October 30. Coastal Army was cut off the next morning, forcing its retreat into the Crimean Mountains toward Alushta. After a long trek it began to reach Sevastopol in early November. On November 20 the 157th was evacuated to Novorossiysk.

In December the division provided cadre for the headquarters of 44th Army, which was forming in the North Caucasus District. Colonel Tomilov left his duties on December 5 as he was hospitalized in Grozny to recover from the leg wounds he sustained on October 20. Col. Dmitrii Semyonovich Kuropatenko took over until January 9, 1942, when Tomilov returned.

The 157th was now moved to the Transcaucasian Military District and was substantially rebuilt with replacements from the 100th Reserve Regiment. As of December 31 the division had 1,023 officers, 2,040 non-commissioned officers, and 9,047 enlisted personnel, for a total of 12,110, very close to the official shtat of December 6. They were equipped with 7,948 rifles, 329 semi-automatic rifles, nine sub-machine guns, 103 light machine guns, 66 heavy machine guns, four antiaircraft machine guns and one 25mm gun, 12 76mm regimental guns, 15 122mm howitzers, a total of 83 mortars of several calibres, and 33 radios. It also had extra weapons that were for the most part allocated to mountain rifle divisions: two 76mm mountain guns and five 107mm mortars, plus four 76mm antiaircraft guns. It also had 1,782 horses, seven cars, 100 trucks, eight tractors, one motorcycle, and 16 specialized vehicles on strength. At about this time as well the 85th Light Artillery Regiment and 212th Antitank Battalion were disbanded while the new 422nd Artillery was formed as a standard "mixed" regiment (76mm cannons and 122mm howitzers), and the 141st Reconnaissance Battalion became the 190th Reconnaissance Company.

=== Kerch landings ===
The chief of staff of Caucasus Front (later Crimean Front), Maj. Gen. F. I. Tolbukhin, came up with an overly elaborate plan to compromise the positions of German 11th Army in the Kerch Peninsula with many small amphibious landings at multiple points rather than one large landing. This would begin overnight on December 25/26 when five different transport groups would land a total of 7,500 troops from the 224th Rifle and 302nd Mountain Rifle Divisions of 51st Army on separate beaches north and south of Kerch. Despite minimal resistance from the over-extended German 46th Infantry Division the landings were badly hampered by poor planning, adverse weather, and air attacks and they were largely defeated by late on December 28.

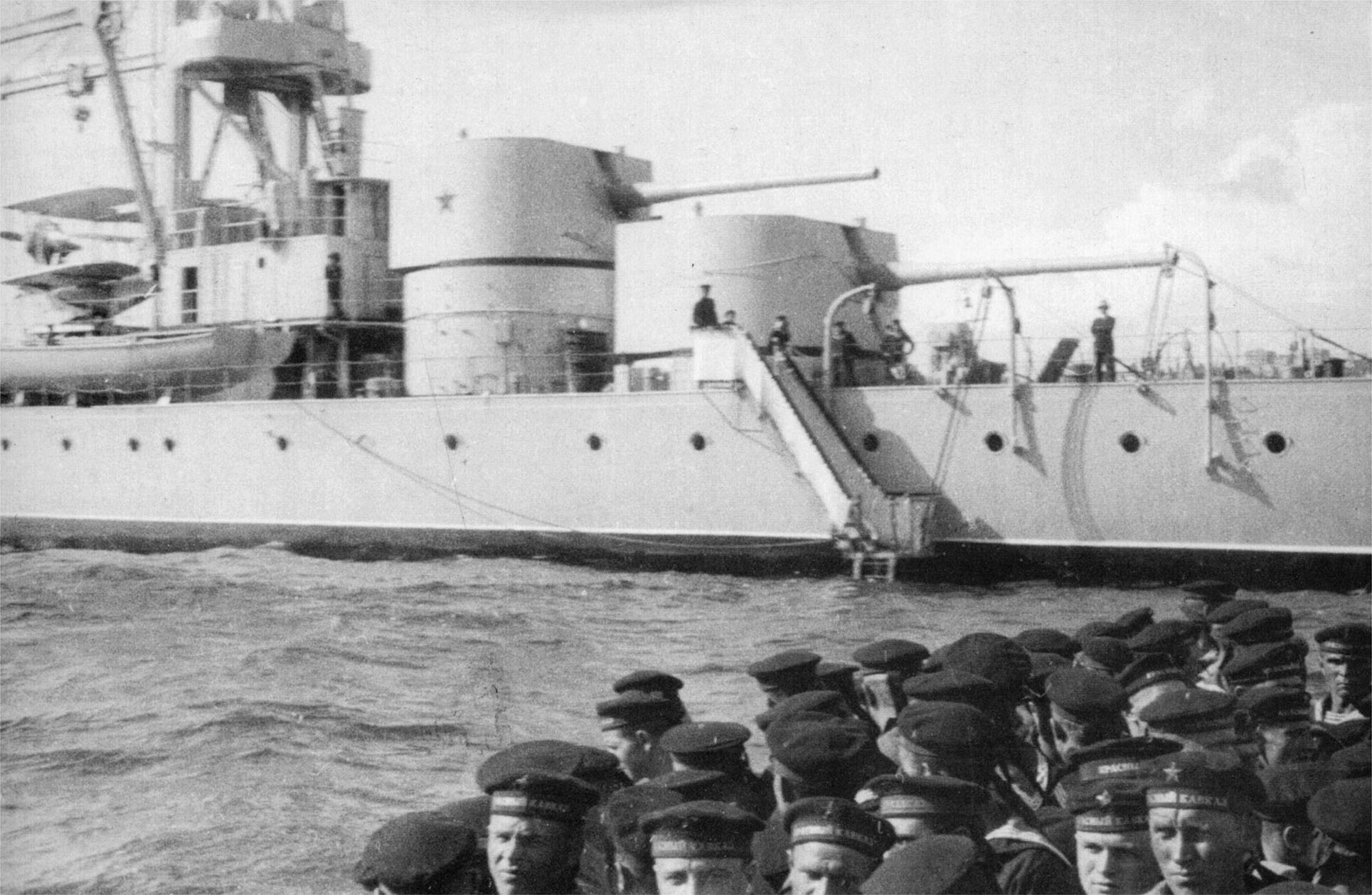
Rear 180mm gun turrets of Krasny Kavkaz

However, as the weather subsided the next phase of Tolbukhin's plan began with the loading of two assault regiments of 44th Army, one of which was the 157th's 633rd, aboard an invasion fleet at Novorossiysk. The fleet comprised two light cruisers (one of which was the Krasny Kavkaz), eight destroyers, 14 transports, and an assortment of small craft. The target was the Crimean port of Feodosia, which was largely held by two battalions of artillery and 700-800 lightly armed engineers. The fleet approached at 0350 hours on December 29 and began a 13-minute bombardment as light forces landed to secure the harbor entrance. Three destroyers entered to unload naval infantrymen before the Krasny Kavkaz was brought alongside the harbor mole at 0500 to offload 1,853 troops of the 633rd. German guns replied, hitting the cruiser 17 times and setting Turret #2 on fire while the ship returned fire with its 180mm main guns. After three hours the commander, Cpt. 1st Rank A. M. Guscin, successfully pulled away with his mission complete.

By this time the German command had lost all control of the port and transports were beginning to land vehicles and artillery. As Soviet infantry moved into the city the German gunners and engineers could put up little effective resistance. By 1000 hours the XXXXII Army Corps commander, Gen. Lt. Hans Graf von Sponeck, was informed that the Red Army had most of the city and was still coming ashore; in fact 4,500 men landed in the morning and by day's end large portions of three divisions, including the 157th, had disembarked. Sponeck had no reserves of any size available and the communications to his 46th Infantry were immediately threatened. He ordered the Romanian 8th Cavalry and 4th Mountain Brigades to block to roads to the west and phoned Manstein to ask permission to withdraw the 46th, which was refused. Manstein instead promised reinforcements to retake Feodosia. Sponeck now took the extraordinary step of cutting communications with 11th Army and ordering the 46th to retreat regardless, for which he was eventually court-martialled and executed. He also ordered the two Romanian brigades to counterattack Feodosia on December 30 without artillery or air support. This was quickly repulsed, after which the three divisions (157th, 63rd Mountain Rifle, 236th Mountain Rifle) pushed northward, threatening the isolation that Sponeck feared. The Soviet force was organized, along with the 404th Rifle Division, as the 9th Rifle Corps.

The 46th Infantry marched 120km westward in a snowstorm during December 30–31, abandoning vehicles due to lack of fuel and with heavy weapons falling behind, only to find the 63rd Mountain blocking its path at Vladislavovka. Unable to break through the German troops had no option but to move cross-country through the 10 km-wide (6.2 mi) gap that still remained between the 63rd and the Sea of Azov, and they formed a new defensive line on January 1, 1942, roughly 16 km (9.9 mi) west of Feodosia. An attack that day on the XXXXII Corps command post at Ismail-Terek by infantry and T-26 tanks of 44th Army failed with the loss of 16 vehicles knocked out. The withdrawal allowed 302nd Mountain to take Kerch and 51st Army soon cleared the rest of the Kerch Peninsula, leaving it and 44th Army facing thin German defenses along the roads to Sevastopol, where Coastal Army held out.

==== Feodosia counterattack ====
44th Army appeared to be in a good position with 23,000 troops ashore and the Axis forces appearing weak and disorganized. The 236th Division was holding about 13 km (8.1 mi) west of Feodosia on the Biyuk-Eget ridge while 63rd Mountain remained on the defense in and around Vladislavovka. In fact the Army was overextended and Crimean Front was hampered by the inept leadership of Lt. Gen. D. T. Kozlov. By January 13 von Manstein had concentrated more than four divisions outside Feodosia. His counteroffensive began at dawn on January 15, focused on the 236th which was badly defeated in a single day of fighting, in part because Kozlov was convinced the German objective was Vladislavovka and therefore concentrated most of his reserves to this sector. Feodosia fell to the Axis on January 17 and three days later both 44th and 51st Armies were in retreat to the Parpach Isthmus under pressure from XXXXII and XXX Army Corps. The front now settled into a static line of trenches, barbed wire, and dugouts as the crippled 44th Army attempted to recover. 9th Corps was abolished during the month and the 157th again came under direct Army command.

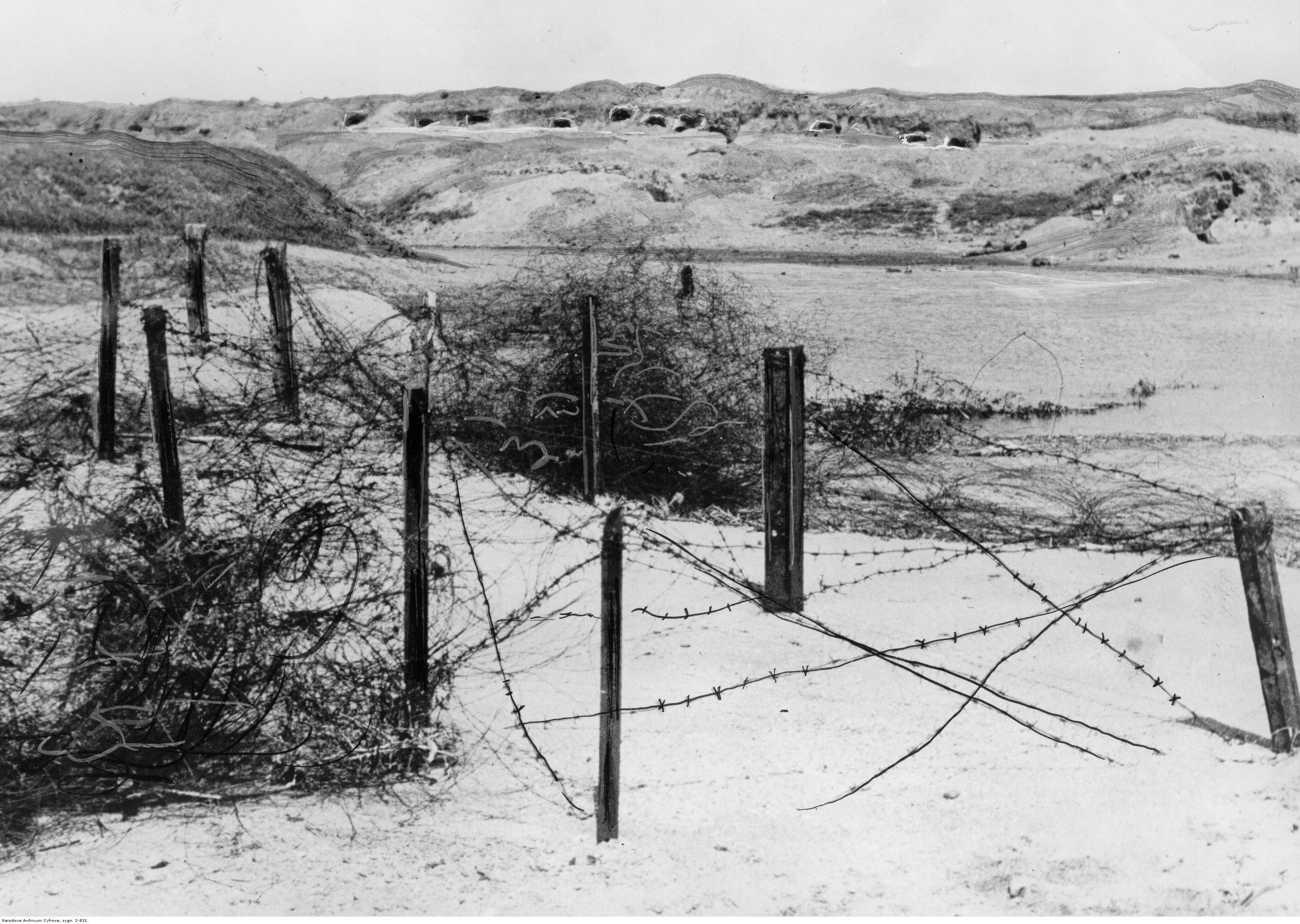
Red Army defenses on the Parpach Isthmus, May 1942

From February 27 to April 11 Crimean Front launched a series of efforts to break out west of Parpach toward Sevastopol but these had little result beyond heavy Soviet casualties. 51st Army on the northern part of the line did most of this fighting with 44th Army offering diversionary support; as one further result the bulk of the Front's forces ended up massed on this northern flank. At the start of May 44th Army had the 157th, 63rd Mountain, 404th, 276th, and 396th Rifle Divisions under command.

=== Operation Bustard Hunt ===
Before the last of these offensives ended von Manstein began planning an operation to destroy all three armies of Crimean Front in one stroke. Operation Trappenjagd would initially target the 44th Army, which was now defending a sector about 6 km (3.7 mi) long with its five rifle divisions plus two tank brigades. Although defenses in depth had been prepared, almost all the rifle units were deployed within 3km of the front line. They were backed by an 11m-wide antitank ditch across the Parpach Isthmus which was protected by minefields, barbed wire and steel girders planted vertically. When the attack began on May 8 German airstrikes quickly achieved air superiority and a 10-minute artillery preparation on the 63rd Mountain and 276th Divisions began at 0415 hours. The 157th and 404th Divisions were in second echelon guarding the ditch. Despite holding naturally strong positions the frontline regiments of the 63rd Mountain were shattered in just three and a half hours, and German advance elements gained a bridgehead over the ditch by 0755 hours.

Meanwhile, one infantry company of the 132nd Infantry Division, plus a pioneer platoon, were embarked on a flotilla of motorized Sturmboote from Feodosia to make a landing some 1,400m behind the ditch. The Black Sea Fleet did nothing to interfere, and light artillery and mortar fire failed to score any hits. This bold move unhinged the second echelon as two bunkers covering the coast were quickly taken. During the rest of the day the German motorboats ferried in most of the remainder of the 436th Infantry Regiment while the 157th and 404th were pinned down by heavy air attacks, although 13 Sturmboote were eventually lost as Soviet aim improved. In addition, the 28th Jäger Division used the air cover to expand its bridgehead, eventually linking up with the 436th. XXX Corps captured 4,514 prisoners in this operation at a cost of only 388 killed and wounded.

The following day the 22nd Panzer Division crossed the ditch at a point farther to the north and began pressing eastward, although this was mostly halted by heavy rains on the night of May 9/10. As the rout continued the commanders of 44th and 47th Armies were relieved of command, and on May 15 one regiment of the 170th Infantry advanced more than 80km to reach Kerch itself, which fell the next day. The remnants of the 157th that were able to escape the debacle returned to the North Caucasus Front. On June 1, Colonel Tomilov left the division due to serious wounds; he never returned to the front and served in the educational establishment until his retirement, being promoted to the rank of major general on October 16, 1943. He was replaced by Col. Yakov Lvovich Shteiman until June 15 when Colonel Kuropatenko again took command.

== Battle of Stalingrad ==
As of June 28 the 44th Army had been moved to Transcaucasus Front and the 157th remained in North Caucasus Front with 51st Army. As the German summer offensive developed on July 12 the STAVKA took the precaution of ordering the Front to concentrate three divisions from 51st Army (157th, 156th, and 91st), each with a regiment of Guards mortars in support, to form a covering force on the south bank of the Don River east of Rostov-na-Donu. At the same time it ordered the 64th Army, under command of Lt. Gen. V. I. Chuikov, to take up positions between Surovikino on the Chir River and Verkhnekurmoiarskaya on the Don. The next day Hitler redirected the 4th Panzer Army to take crossings over the Don from 120km - 210km east of Rostov. The XXXXVIII Panzer Corps' 29th Motorized Division attempted to break out of its bridgehead at Tsimlianskaya on the morning of July 25, but was stymied by strong counterattacks delivered by the 157th, 91st, and 138th Rifle Divisions. On July 31 the panzers began an advance on the Abganerovo axis. This struck the 157th and 138th Divisions, tearing apart their defenses east of the Don and forcing them to withdraw in considerable disorder toward Kotelnikovo. At this time 51st Army was part of Stalingrad Front.

=== Fighting on the Approaches ===
Late on August 2 the new commander of 64th Army, Maj. Gen. M. S. Shumilov, created the Southern Operational Group under command of his now deputy, Chuikov. The next day Shumilov ordered the 138th and 157th to reinforce this Group, which was to defend the line of the Aksai River. By nightfall on August 4 Chuikov's Group had proven incapable of maintaining a coherent defense over a front of 60km with divisions that had from 1,500 - 4,500 men each (the 157th had 1,500 on strength), with a total of about 40 tanks and 300 guns and mortars in support. Unless something was done, German forces could advance on Stalingrad virtually unimpeded. In response, in order to improve command and control, the STAVKA split Stalingrad Front and created Southeastern Front effective August 7 and 51st Army, with the 157th, was subordinated to the latter, although the division remained part of Group Chuikov. It was currently holding its defense along the Aksai, at Novoaksaysky and Chikov.

As these command rearrangements were being made the 14th Panzer Division resumed its advance on August 5 and during the day thrust 30-40km north from Aksai, bypassing Group Chuikov's weak left flank and reaching Abganerovo Station, 70km southwest of Stalingrad. Despite this perilous position Chuikov's Group managed to halt the left wing of 4th Panzer Army along the lower Aksai for 12 days. This forced the Panzer Army to divide its forces instead of concentrating for a decisive advance on the city. Also on August 5 the Romanian VI Army Corps managed to force a bridgehead at the junction between the 138th and 157th divisions but this was thrown back with a dawn counterattack the next day. Two days later the Romanian 1st Infantry Division punched through the defenses west of Zalivskii, halfway between Aksai and the Don. Kuropatenko's troops, reinforced by a regiment from 29th Rifle Division, struck both flanks, driving the Romanians back again and reportedly "destroying up to two battalions of enemy infantry and, by 0600 hours, digging in along the Novoaksaiskii and Chikov line." Late on August 10 the Romanian force attacked the 157th in an effort to relieve pressure on XXXXVIII Panzer Corps, but this was driven off with heavy losses. It was reported by the Red Army General Staff that the division:

... was fighting to destroy the enemy in the vicinity of Hill 78.9 and Popova Balka [ravine]. Seven guns, 5 heavy and 9 light machine guns and about 350 rifles were seized, and up to 120 enemy soldiers were destroyed [killed] in the fighting.

On August 13 General Shumilov, concerned that Group Chuikov could be encircled, ordered a phased withdrawal to the Myshkova River. By this time the division had been formally subordinated to 64th Army as the 51st fell back east toward the Volga.

4th Panzer Army resumed its advance on August 20 with XXXXVIII Panzer, which fielded 180-200 tanks. 64th Army was deployed across a front of 120km, with the extended sector along the upper Myshkova from Vasilevka to the Don defended by the 157th, the 118th Fortified Region, 66th Naval Rifle Brigade, and two military school regiments; the 208th Rifle Division was in Army reserve. The assault soon drove back the first echelon divisions along the lower Myshkova and a battlegroup of 14th Panzer, reinforced by part of 29th Motorized Division, advanced 4km and captured Tinguta. On August 22 the XXXXVIII Panzer redeployed and in heavy fighting reached the southern and eastern approaches to Abganerova Station. The assault was resumed the next day, and the Red Army General Staff stated in its report on the next day's fighting that the 157th drove Axis forces from the region west of Vasilevka. On August 29 XXXXVIII Panzer found a weak spot and overwhelmed the 126th Rifle Division north of Abganerovo Station, advancing 20km during the day, forcing other elements of the Army to abandon their positions at Tinguta.

With a path open to the rear areas of 64th and 62nd Armies the commander of Southeastern Front, Col. Gen. A. I. Yeryomenko, ordered Shumilov to withdraw to new defenses from Novy Rogachik southeastward along the Chervlennaia River to Ivanovka, 25km southwest of Stalingrad. On September 1 the 157th was reported as being in combat with German tanks and withdrawing to a line from Tsybinko to Gavrilovka. The penetration of 24th Panzer Division to Basargino Station paved the way for a further advance by the LI Army Corps of German 6th Army, which was threatening to reach the Kalach–Stalingrad rail line near Novyi Rogachik. If this was successful a total of three divisions, including the 157th, plus two rifle brigades and two school regiments of the 62nd and 64th Armies, would be encircled and destroyed, in which case LI Corps would likely be able to penetrate into the city from the west. In the event, when the reconnaissance elements of 24th Panzer advanced early on September 2 they found no Red Army forces to their front. 62nd Army had successfully taken up new defenses on Stalingrad's north and west outskirts, while 64th Army was now in its designated positions from Staro-Dubrovka through Elkhi to Ivanovka, guarding the city's west and southwest sectors. Colonel Kuropatenko was now reassigned to the battered 126th Division; he went on to lead three other rifle divisions and was promoted to major general on September 1, 1943. Artillery officer Col. Aleksandr Vasilevich Kirsanov moved up from command of the 157th's artillery to full command on September 3. He would remain in this post for the duration of the first formation.

=== Battles for the Suburbs ===
XXXXVIII Panzer Corps deployed 14th and 24th Panzer, 29th Motorized, 94th Infantry, and Romanian 20th Infantry Divisions on September 3 in line abreast to attack east from Voroponovo Station to Elkhi, with the objective of reaching the Volga. The attack struck the boundary between 62nd and 64th Armies and forced the 157th, 204th, 126th Divisions and 10th Rifle Brigade back eastward toward Gornaya Polyana and the river south of Kuporosnoe. However, the 14th Panzer and 29th Motorized were repelled in the sector from west of Peschanka south to Elkhi. However, the next day the 29th Motorized and 94th Infantry succeeded in taking Elkhi and some ground to its north.

4th Panzer Army renewed its offensive on September 8. The 29th Motorized and a battlegroup of 14th Panzer wheeled south and struck the extreme right wing of 64th Army southeast of Voroponovo Station. The assault pressed the 204th and 126th Divisions and the reinforcing 138th Division and 133rd Tank Brigade back to new defenses extending southwest from Peschanka. The Army reported that one rifle regiment of the 138th "as a result of the enemy tank attack... was almost completely destroyed," although "18 enemy tanks were destroyed and burned." The following day the German forces drove southward west of Kuporosnoe, forcing the 157th, 204th and 138th Divisions to abandon Staro-Dubovka. The Soviet forces withdrew to the new defense line east and west of Gornaya Polyana, which was already manned by the 126th Division. During the day the remainder of 14th Panzer reinforced the assault of the 29th Motorized and while this was halted short of Kuporosnoe and the west bank of the Volga, the four rifle divisions were being rapidly eroded away.

On September 12 the fighting for the Stalingrad suburbs reached its climax. 14th Panzer was now supported by the mixed German/Romanian IV Army Corps and probed the defenses of the 64th Army from the southwest outskirts of Kuporosnoe around to its boundary with 57th Army at Ivanovka. This position would become known as the Beketovka bridgehead. At this time the division was facing the Romanian 20th Infantry west of Gornaya Polyana and was recorded as having a total of 1,996 personnel. During the following weeks the focus of the overall battle shifted to the city itself, but overnight on October 1/2 Shumilov unleashed an attack against IV Corps northwest of Beketovka, striking the German 371st Infantry Division at and west of Peschanka with forces of five divisions, including the 157th. The commander of the 422nd Rifle Division, Col. I. K. Morozov, wrote:

Day and night, the divisions of 64th Army fought their way to the north to link up with 62nd Army, but the distance between the armies scarcely diminished.

Although the attack failed, it was an unpleasant distraction for Gen. F. Paulus whose 6th Army was now deeply involved in the fighting in the city.

=== Operation Uranus ===
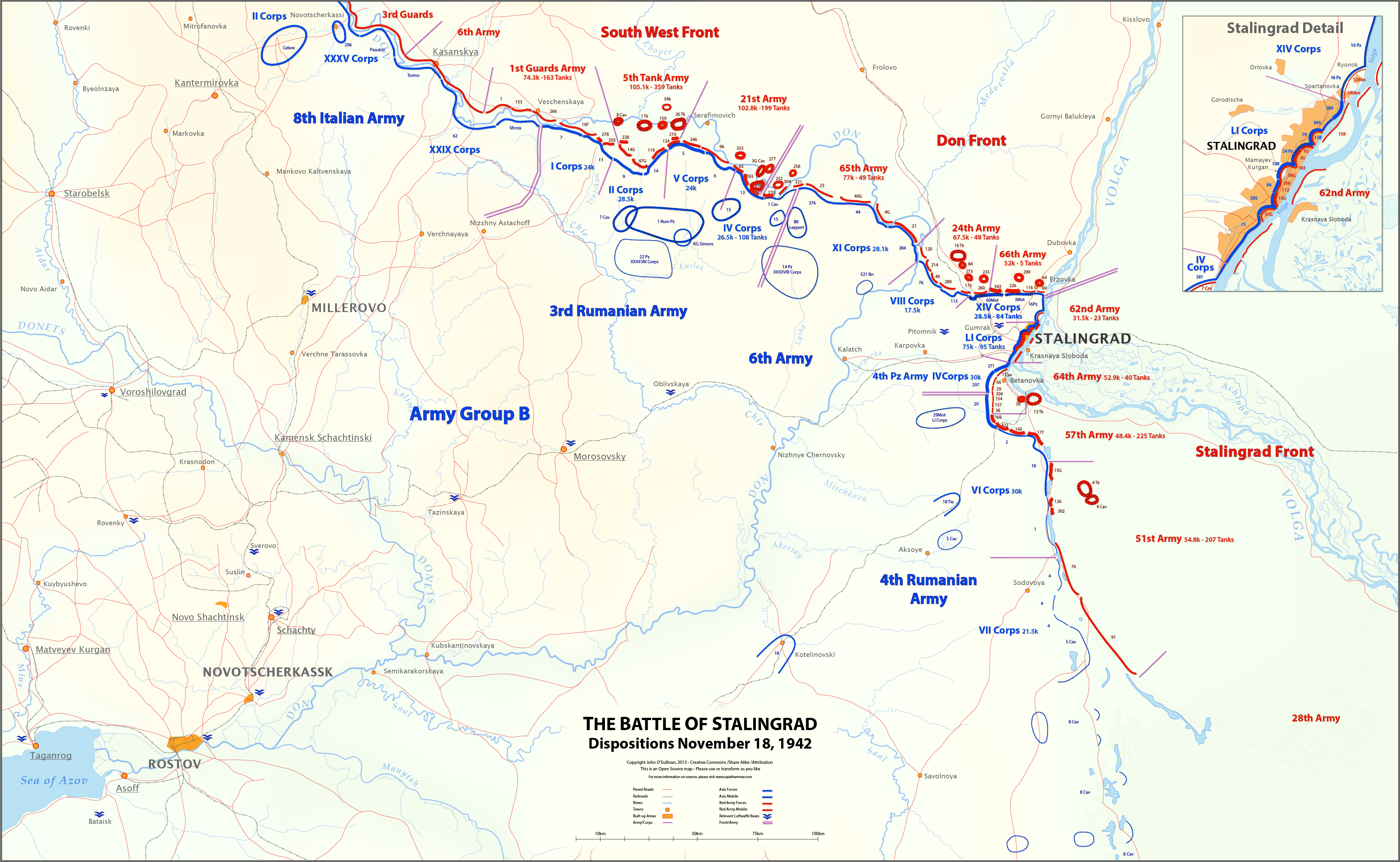
Preparations for Operation Uranus. Note position of 157th Division southwest of Stalingrad.

As of November 19 the 157th was one of five rifle divisions in 64th Army, which also commanded five rifle brigades, two tank brigades, and several other formations. The Army was now back in Stalingrad Front, commanded by General Yeryomenko, who had helped plan the operation that would encircle and destroy the German 6th Army. Under this plan the 157th, 204th and 38th Rifle Divisions, supported by the 13th and 56th Tank Brigades and several supporting units, would form a shock group with the objectives of penetrating the defenses of the German 297th Infantry Division and the Romanian 20th Division, reaching Yagodnyi and Nariman on the first day, then envelop and destroy these Axis forces in cooperation with 57th Army.

The Front's counteroffensive began on November 20 with a 75-minute artillery preparation at 1430 hours and 64th Army launched its ground assault at about 1535 hours. Supported by about 40 infantry support tanks the three rifle divisions attacked to the west in the 12 km-wide (7.5 mi) sector from the north bank of the Chervlenaia River to just east of Elkhi. This was in close cooperation with 57th Army's shock group, the 422nd and 169th Rifle Divisions, attacking south of the Chervlenaia. The three divisions of the 64th struck the defenses of the 297th Infantry's 523rd Regiment in and around Elkhi, and the Romanian 20th, which was spread from Elkhi as far south as Tundutovo Station. The 157th, in the shock group's center, along with the 38th, rapidly gained as much as 5km, sweeping through the forward positions of the 20th Romanian's left wing and center. The 204th, on the shock group's right wing, faced determined resistance at and north of Elkhi and made only a minimal advance despite launching multiple assaults into the early evening. The offensive resumed shortly after dawn but soon encountered intense counterattacks, reportedly supported by as many as 70 tanks likely from the 29th Motorized, which halted all progress by the 204th and 157th Divisions near Yagodnyi and also forced a short withdrawal by the 38th after it took heavy losses.

Early on November 22 General Shumilov focused his Army's efforts on its left flank while replacing the 38th Division with the 36th Guards Rifle Division, reinforced with the 56th Tank Brigade, 1104th Artillery Regiment and a battalion of the 4th Guards Mortar Regiment. The 36th Guards, flanked on the right by the 157th and 204th, went over to the attack at 1300 hours and advanced roughly 5km in heavy fighting while the 157th covered 3km toward a group of burial mounds at Height Marker 1.7 by 1730 with the 204th making similar gains on the right. Under heavy pressure the commander of IV Corps ordered the Romanian 20th and most of the 297th Division to fall back to a new defensive line anchored on the town of Tsybenko; this line ran eastward 10km along the Karavatka Balka to Elkhi, which was still in the hands of the 297th. During November 23 the 64th Army shock group faced resistance from rearguards of the German 297th and 371st Infantry and the 82nd Regiment of the Romanian 20th Infantry but still advanced up to 8 km (5.0 mi) as the Axis forces fell back to their new line. On the right of the 36th Guards the 157th, with support from 13th Tank Brigade, conducted a successful pursuit through the day, advancing about 4km and capturing the strongpoint at Yagodnyi from the Romanian 82nd Regiment by 1600 and then covering another 2 km (1.2 mi) to the village of Popov by dusk. On the same day the Soviet forces completed the encirclement of German 6th Army. The next day the shock group, weakened by casualties during the offensive to date, ran up against the strong Tsybenko–Elkhi defensive line and faltered. The 204th and 157th were thrown back along the Balka by the Romanian 82nd and the German 523rd Regiments.

On November 28 the Army launched an attack with the 157th and 38th Divisions with 50-60 tanks of 56th and 235th Tank Brigades on a 6 km-wide (3.7 mi) sector held by 297th Infantry along the same line, in cooperation with a similar effort by 57th Army. The two divisions struck the Romanian 82nd, the 297th's Bicycle Detachment, two battalions of the 523rd Infantry Regiment, plus Battlegroup Pickel and the 670th Regiment of the 371st Infantry. In two days of intense fighting the 157th penetrated the Romanian defenses to a depth of as much as 2 km (1.2 mi) before being forced back by counterattacks supported by a handful tanks of 14th Panzer Division. The 4th Company of 716th Rifle Regiment was cut off in the Yagodnyi area and forced to break out at the cost of heavy casualties. Altogether, IV Corps claimed 330 Soviet soldiers killed, 19 tanks destroyed and 21 more damaged. 64th Army would remain facing these defenses well into December.

=== Operation Ring ===
On December 2 the 29th Rifle Division, backed by about 40 tanks, struck the defenses of two battalions of the German 523rd Regiment on the 6 km-wide (3.7 mi) sector from Yagodnyi to Elkhi and, at the cost of perhaps 30 tanks destroyed, managed to capture part of the latter place. Further west at Tsybenko repeated assaults by the 157th and 204th Divisions and elements of 57th Army achieved little or nothing. The situation on this sector remained stalemated into January 1943.

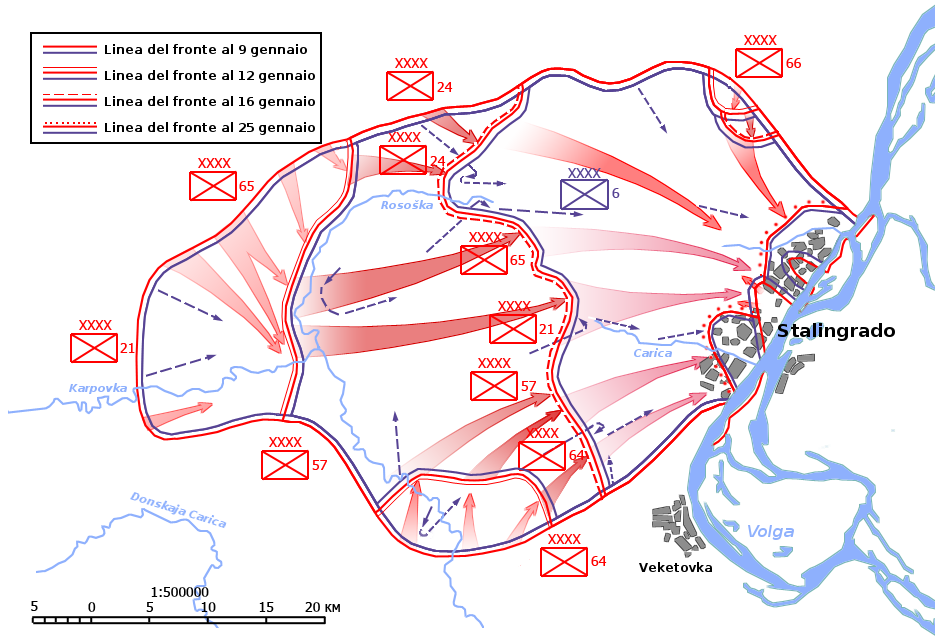
Operation Ring

By January the Soviet forces besieging the Stalingrad Kessel had been consolidated into Don Front, under command of Col. Gen. K. K. Rokossovskii. In the planning for Operation Koltso [Ring] the 64th Army was directed to initially pin down the opposing German forces it opposed before exploiting to the north and northeast. Shumilov organized his main attack on the sector from south of Hill 111.6 east to Elkhi with a shock group that consisted of the 157th, the 204th, and the 36th Guards, plus the 143rd Rifle Brigade. This force was supported by 51 tanks from the 90th Tank Brigade and 35th and 166th Tank Regiments. This group faced the center of the 297th Infantry Division, including the Romanian 82nd Regiment.

The offensive began on January 10. Attacking at 0900 hours the 157th and the 143rd Brigade reached Hill 119.7 and encircled Popov. By day's end the 64th and 57th Armies' shock groups had carved a penetration up to 3km deep through the defenses of the 297th Infantry and forced it to use all its reserves in futile attempts to close the breach. In addition the German division had lost 18 of its 31 antitank guns. The shock groups continued to gain ground the following day and on January 12 did further damage to the defenses of IV Army Corps, with the 157th and 204th Divisions and 143rd Rifle Brigade enveloping Hill 119.7 from three sides. On the fourth day the 157th advanced to positions 2-3km northwest of Elkhi, facing the refused right flank of the 297th Infantry's 523rd Regiment. The gap in IV Corps' defenses was now 15 km (9.3 mi) wide and up to 8 km (5.0 mi) deep. Early on January 14 Shumilov shuffled his forces in preparation for a wheel to northeast toward the ruined city. By the end of the day the 157th, 66th Naval Rifle Brigade, 169th Division, and the three brigades of 7th Rifle Corps were facing the left wing of 297th and the 371st Infantry from Hill 119.7 east to Elkhi and northeast to Kuporosnoe. Over the next two days the pace of the offensive slowed and Rokossovskii, who was promoted to colonel general on the 15th, paused operations from January 18–21. 64th Army spent these four days preparing for the final drive; on the 22 km-wide (14 mi) attack sector of 21st, 57th and 64th Armies 4,100 guns (76mm calibre or larger) and 75 tanks (mostly KV models) were concentrated.

Ring resumed on January 22, when 64th Army took the Staro-Dubovka region. The advance resumed the next day; 36th Guards and 29th Divisions captured Peschanka from the 297th Infantry and then pushed eastward toward Verkhnaya Elshanka, which provided the 157th and 169th a gap to exploit toward the northeast. Together they seized Zelenaya Polyana, just 4km from the outskirts of Stalingrad's southern suburbs. During January 24 the size of the pocket was reduced by about 33 percent as the German forces outside the city fell back toward the ruins. The following day 64th Army began a general advance through the suburbs, with the division assisting in the liberation of Elshanka and Minina. During this fighting the 157th captured the infamous grain elevator that had been the site of a see-saw battle in September and took a large number of prisoners before driving toward the Tsaritsa River. On January 27 the STAVKA issued orders for the 157th and 169th, plus two rifle brigades, to be withdrawn from the Army into the Reserve of the Supreme High Command for redeployment to other sectors. On March 1 the 157th was redesignated as the 76th Guards Rifle Division.

== 2nd Formation ==
A new 157th Rifle Division began forming on May 21 at Kalinin in the Moscow Military District, based on the 148th Rifle Brigade and 134th Rifle Brigade.

=== 148th Rifle Brigade ===
This brigade began forming in December 1941 in the Siberian Military District. In April 1942 it left that District to enter the Reserve of the Supreme High Command, and by the end of May it had been assigned to the 8th Guards Rifle Corps, which was a reserve formation in Western Front. (Guards rifle corps at this time generally comprised one Guards rifle division and several regular rifle brigades.) The Corps was assigned to 20th Army in July and took part in the First Rzhev–Sychyovka offensive operation which began on its sector on August 4. While the offensive gained ground in the Pogoreloe Gorodishche area it was ultimately unsuccessful and by September the Corps was back in Western Front reserves for rebuilding. It returned to 20th Army for the unsuccessful Operation Mars in November, and in February 1943 the 148th was reassigned to 33rd Army, also in Western Front, where it was under direct Army command. In May it returned to the Reserve of the Supreme High Command and moved to Kalinin to help form the new 157th.

=== 134th Rifle Brigade ===
The second brigade of this number was formed in January 1943 in the South Ural Military District. In March it was sent west into the Moscow Military District where it was soon disbanded to provide manpower and equipment for a few newly forming rifle divisions, including the 157th.

Once formed the division's order of battle was very similar to that of its 1st formation:

- 384th Rifle Regiment
- 633rd Rifle Regiment
- 716th Rifle Regiment
- 422nd Artillery Regiment
- 212th Antitank Battalion
- 141st Reconnaissance Company
- 150th Sapper Battalion
- 199th Signal Battalion (later 159th Signal Company)
- 152nd Medical/Sanitation Battalion
- 149th Chemical Defense (Anti-gas) Company
- 124th Motor Transport Company
- 367th Field Bakery
- 157th Divisional Veterinary Hospital
- 1793rd Field Postal Station
- 1750th Field Office of the State Bank

Col. Dmitrii Ivanovich Golubev was appointed to command on the day the division began forming. This officer had served in the training establishment from before the outbreak of the war until he was given command of the 134th Brigade. On June 16 he was moved to the position of deputy commander that had been held by Col. Grigorii Kondratevich Zaitsev as he took over full command. Zaitsev had considerable combat experience and had recently led the 143rd Rifle Brigade. The division immediately came under command of Lt. Gen. E. P. Zhuravlev's 68th Army, and on July 12 this Army became part of the active forces when it joined Western Front. The 157th was under direct Army command.

== Battle of Smolensk ==
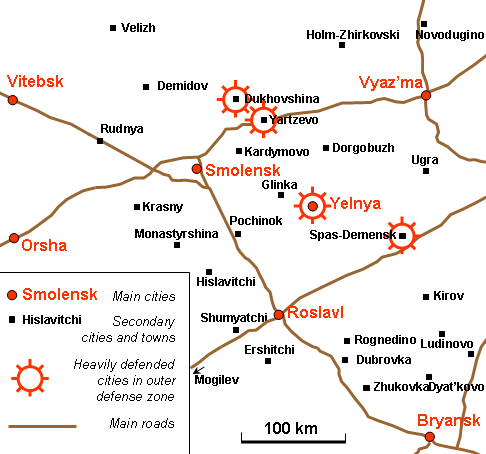
General layout of the Smolensk region during the offensive

Operation Suvorov began on August 7 with a preliminary bombardment at 0440 hours and a ground assault at 0630. The commander of Western Front, Col. Gen. V. D. Sokolovskii, committed his 5th, 10th Guards, and 33rd Armies in the initial assault, while 68th Army was in second echelon. The attack quickly encountered heavy opposition and stalled. By early afternoon, Sokolovskii became concerned about the inability of most of his units to advance and decided to commit 68th Army's 81st Rifle Corps to reinforce the push by 10th Guards Army against XII Army Corps. This was a premature and foolish decision on a number of levels, crowding an already stalled front with even more troops and vehicles.

On the morning of August 8, Sokolovskii resumed his offensive at 0730 hours, but now he had three armies tangled up on the main axis of advance. After a 30-minute artillery preparation the Soviets resumed their attacks across a 10 km-wide (6.2 mi) front. 81st Corps was inserted between the two engaged corps of 10th Guards, putting further pressure on the 268th Infantry Division. Reinforcements from 2nd Panzer Division were coming up from Yelnya in support. By August 11 it became clear that XII Corps was running out of infantry and so late in the day the German forces began falling back toward the Yelnya–Spas-Demensk railway. By now Western Front had expended nearly all its artillery ammunition and was not able to immediately exploit the withdrawal. Sokolovskii was authorized to temporarily suspend Suvorov on August 21.

=== Yelnya Offensive ===
Sokolovskii was given just one week to reorganize for the next push. In the new plan the 10th Guards, 21st, 33rd and 68th Armies would make the main effort, attacking XII Corps all along its front until it shattered, then push mobile groups through the gaps to seize Yelnya. It kicked off on August 28 with a 90-minute artillery preparation across a 25 km-wide (16 mi) front, but did not initially include 68th Army. A gap soon appeared in the German front in 33rd Army's sector, and the 5th Mechanized Corps was committed. On the second day this Corps achieved a breakthrough and Yelnya was liberated on August 30. By this time the attacking rifle divisions were reduced to 3,000 men or fewer. By the beginning of September the 157th had left 68th Army and was reassigned to 65th Rifle Corps in 33rd Army.

=== Advance to Smolensk ===
The offensive was again suspended on September 7, with one week allowed for logistical replenishment. When it resumed on September 15, German 4th Army was expected to hold a 164km front with fewer than 30,000 troops. Sokolovskii prepared to make his main effort with the same four armies against IX Army Corps' positions west of Yelnya; the Corps had five decimated divisions to defend a 40 km-wide (25 mi) front. At 0545 hours a 90-minute artillery preparation began, followed by intense bombing attacks. When the ground attack began the main effort was directed south of the Yelnya–Smolensk railway, near the town of Leonovo. After making gains the attacks resumed at 0630 on September 16. Although the IX Corps was not broken after two days, it was ordered to withdraw to the next line of defense overnight on September 16/17. Sokolovskii now planned to pivot the 33rd and 21st Armies, with the 6th Guards Cavalry Corps, toward the southwest, aiming to cut the Smolensk–Roslavl railroad near Pochinok. On September 20, during fighting for the village of Gorodok, near Pochinok, Colonel Zaitsev was fatally wounded. He would be buried with full military honors at Spas-Demensk and was replaced by Col. Aleksandr Efimovich Vinogradov. This officer had been in command of the 65th Guards Rifle Division but had been removed on August 9 for failure to meet his objectives in the early part of Suvorov and placed at disposal of the Front command.

Over the coming days 4th Army fell back to the Dora-Stellung. Smolensk was taken on September 25 and 33rd Army advanced on Mogilev while 21st Army was pulled out of the line for regrouping. The retreat finally ended on October 2. As part of this regrouping the 157th was moved to 21st Army where it joined the 61st Rifle Corps.

== Into Belarus ==
Sokolovskii began organizing a new offensive on Orsha to begin on October 12. This would take the form of two thrusts, with 21st and 33rd Armies forming the southern one. The 33rd would concentrate in the sector currently held by the 21st north and south of Lyenina, while the 21st side-stepped to new positions south of Baevo. 61st Corps (157th, 62nd, 95th Rifle Divisions) was located between those two places. Altogether the Army had 85 tanks and self-propelled guns in support. In total, Western Front amassed an attacking force of 19 rifle divisions with artillery support of 150-200 guns and mortars per kilometre of front. The preparation lasted 85 minutes and while the fighting continued for two days the German defense proved effective and deadly to Soviet forces across the front; 21st Army gained no more than 300m-400m west of Baevo at a heavy cost in casualties.

=== Third Orsha Offensive ===
A further regrouping took place from October 16–20. In the course of this the headquarters of 69th Rifle Corps moved from 21st to 68th Army, and the 76th and 157th Divisions also made the move to come under this headquarters. By the end of October 20 a powerful shock group had been formed, based on 31st Army, with a total of 11 rifle divisions. The assault began early on October 21 with an artillery preparation of two hours and ten minutes. This struck the defenses of 197th Infantry Division and punched through, although at considerable cost. This promising start began to stall the next day, when the attackers gained an additional 1,000m on average. On October 24 the 69th Corps' 174th Rifle Division was committed south of the Dniepr River in an effort to develop the penetration. Two days later the offensive collapsed in exhaustion; Western Front had lost more than 4,700 men killed and more than 14,200 wounded. On November 5 the 68th Army was disbanded and the 157th went to 5th Army, still under 69th Corps.

=== Fourth and Fifth Orsha Offensives ===
As of November 14 the division was facing the 30th Panzergrenadier Regiment of 18th Panzergrenadier Division. Sokolovskii had been assured by the STAVKA that his ammunition supply would be improved. He therefore set about planning for a new offensive, relying again on the 10th Guards, 31st, 33rd, and 5th Armies. Two shock groups would be employed, each on a 12 km-wide (7.5 mi) sector on each side of the Dniepr; 5th and 33rd Armies would make a supporting attack south of the river toward Dubrowna and Orsha. Thirty-two rifle divisions would attack, 18 of which were in first echelon. This included the 157th and 76th Divisions, which had the 23rd Guards Tank Brigade in support and managed to take the villages of Zagrazdino and Volkolakovka, although 20 tanks were lost. This was a greater gain than most of the attackers achieved as they faltered in the face of well dug-in defenses backed by artillery and machine gun fire. The operation was suspended on November 18. On November 23 Colonel Vinogradov was hospitalized due to illness; he would never hold another battlefield command. He was replaced by Col. Aleksandr Aleksandrovich Shchennikov, who had previously led the 2nd formation of the 97th Rifle Division and the 36th Rifle Brigade before being removed for failure to attain an objective in September 1942 and being moved to deputy command of the 222nd Rifle Division. He came to the 157th after recovering from wounds received earlier during Suvorov.

The offensive was set to begin again on November 30, and in preparation the 69th Corps and its sector was taken over by 33rd Army. The attackers were forced to slog through wet snow that turned the roads into slurry. Elements of 5th Army finally managed to seize Bobrova on December 2 but German reserves prevented any further advance, and 33rd Army failed to make anything but the smallest gains. By now the Army's divisions were down to 4,000 personnel or less. Following these successive failures Sokolovskii soon ordered his forces to regroup to the north to join 1st Baltic Front in a fresh effort to take Vitebsk.

== Battles for Vitebsk ==
In December the 157th was reassigned to 81st Rifle Corps, which also contained the 95th Division. The Corps was positioned at Arguny and Pogostishche and would soon be joined by the 97th Division. On December 23, 33rd Army, massively reinforced, and the 39th Army of 1st Baltic Front, began a new drive from east and northeast of Vitebsk that was expected to crack the defenses of 3rd Panzer Army and capture the city. 81st Corps was part of the shock group, along with three other rifle corps, organized into two or three echelons. On the first day the defenders were forced back about 1,000m between Kovaleva and Arguny at the boundary of the 206th and 246th Infantry Divisions. On the second day three of the rifle corps, including the 81st, committed their second-echelon divisions and the penetration was deepened to 2-3km, threatening to split the two German divisions. Counterattacks were unsuccessful and on December 25 the Army surged ahead 2–7 km (1.2–4.3 mi) further and cut the Smolensk–Vitebsk railway at a point just 20km southeast of the latter city's central square.

33rd Army's advance continued the next day as 36th Rifle Corps fought for Zakhodniki, west of the rail line. The battle continued through December 27–28 in the Maklaki area, with the 157th attempting to advance east of that place. The STAVKA was well pleased with the progress made by the Army, but less so with the efforts of 1st Baltic Front. Maklaki was taken late on December 28 and its forward elements were within sight of the Vitebsk–Orsha road; through the next two days these elements pivoted to the northwest seeking a more favorable route across the road and seizing the village of Kopti. However, the defenses were never truly penetrated and by December 31 the Soviet forces were held barely short of the road. 33rd Army was ordered to continue on January 1, 1944, but 1st Baltic's 39th Army was completely stalled and unable to offer any support. Sokolovskii now ordered, among other moves, the transfer of the 157th to 5th Army, with orders to hold the south flank of the penetration from Krynki to Bolshaya Vydreya. 5th Army's commander, Lt. Gen. N. I. Krylov, went back to the attack that day with two corps, but this went nowhere and was suspended temporarily on January 6.

The STAVKA ordered the offensive to be renewed on January 8. By now, all of Sokolovskii's divisions and tank brigades were under 40 percent strength. In two days of heavy fighting the 72nd Rifle Corps broke the defenses of part of the Feldherrnhalle Panzergrenadier Division, crossed the road, and pushed 4.5 km (2.8 mi) into the German defenses. By late on January 10 it appeared that 5th and 33rd Armies had created conditions for the commitment of 2nd Guards Tank Corps, if a crossing could be forced over the Luchesa River, just 1,000m farther on. However, German reserves were rapidly arriving and 72nd Corps made no further progress over the next five days.

Despite the weakness of his forces, Krylov stated later:

Undoubtedly, the seizure of the Vitebsk-Orsha main road was a major success. At the same time, this situation created certain complications since the enemy continued to hold on to the region around the village of Krynki, situated 5 kilometres east of Dymanovo, which was occupied by our forces. By doing so, he threatened 5th Army's entire left wing with a penetration to the north in the direction of Eremino, which, if carried out, could force our forces to withdraw behind the line of the Vitebsk-Smolensk railroad.
Thus, the mission of improving its position now gained far greater importance for 5th Army since only by doing so could we prevent an enemy penetration to the north.

He therefore prepared a new offensive to take place on January 15, to the south toward Krynki. Further reinforcements from 33rd Army were transferred to 72nd Corps, in addition to several tank corps. Krylov designated his shock group as the 157th, 199th, and 159th Rifle Divisions in first echelon on a 6 km-wide (3.7 mi) sector, with 173rd and 222nd Divisions plus 36th Rifle Brigade in second. The 157th and 222nd appear to have been under 36th Corps. This resulted in several further days of combat, with the shock group capturing Krynki and driving some 2 km (1.2 mi) further west, although a segment of the Vitebsk–Smolensk railway east of Miafli remained in German hands. After one further regrouping on January 20 the 157th and 199th, backed by the 274th Rifle Division, took this length of rail line and pushed as far as northern outskirts of Shugaevo and Kryukovo. With this, Sokolovskii's January offensive ended. Sixteen days of battle had cost Western Front another 25,000 casualties, 5,500 of whom were killed, for a gain of no more than 4 km (2.5 mi).

=== The Arguny Salient ===
By the beginning of February the 157th was in the 45th Rifle Corps, still in 5th Army, and was located at the southern shoulder of the so-called Arguny salient. As a sideshow to the battles raging south of Vitebsk and along the Luchesa, on February 13 Krylov attempted to take advantage of what he saw as German weakness northeast of Vysochany by launching an attack on their defenses east of Dobrino. However, his intelligence was unaware that the sector was now defended by the entire 211th Infantry Division. The attack was assigned to 45th Corps' 157th and 184th Rifle Divisions, backed by the 43rd Guards and 120th Tank Brigades, and struck the 211th between Chernyshi and Belyi Bor. The attack took the village of Kuchareva and drove the defenders back to new positions just beyond, but then ran out of steam. On February 14 Colonel Shchennikov was moved to take acting command of the 153rd Rifle Division, and he was replaced by Col. Vasilii Aleksandrovich Katyushin, who had been briefly in command of the 153rd. During February, Western Front suffered a total of 71,689 casualties, most of them in 33rd and 5th Armies. A report from late in the month put the personnel strength of the 157th at 3,630. By the start of March the division was under direct Army command.

==== Bogushevsk Offensive ====
Yet another offensive on this sector was planned to begin on March 21. At this time the division was back in 45th Corps in the left of the Corps sector on the Army's left wing. According to the plan the Front's shock group was to penetrate the defense between Drybino and Dobrino prior to pushing south some 5–10 km (3.1–6.2 mi) to the Sukhodrovka River. It was then to push the German forces back to the upper reaches of the Luchesa and create bridgeheads; this would require a total advance of about 15 km (9.3 mi). If this was successful the 45th Corps would join the push with a supporting attack from the Leutino area, and then also reach the Luchesa.

Prior to the attack the 157th shifted to the left to make room for the main shock group, then concentrated with the 159th in the Belyi Bor area to prepare for their follow-up attack. They were facing the 406th Grenadier Regiment of 201st Security Division, plus a battalion of the 14th Infantry Division, and were deployed on a 2 km-wide (1.2 mi) front. The main offensive began after an intense artillery preparation, and its weight broke the defense on a wide sector, with an advance of between 1–4 km (0.62–2.49 mi) on the first day. However, 3rd Panzer Army reacted quickly with reserves, which largely halted the advance. On either March 24 or 25, now in an effort to restore the offensive, the 159th and 157th struck southwest of Dobrino against the 406th Regiment, which had already sent part of its forces west to battle the main shock group. They penetrated as much as 2 km (1.2 mi) and took Kukharevka, but another quick reaction held the Soviet divisions short of Dobrino and Vysochany. By March 27 it was clear that the offensive had failed, although the fighting went on for another two days. Casualties were again high, totaling 57,861 in Western Front during March, again mostly from 5th and 33rd Armies. The last days of March saw several changes in command of the 157th. Colonel Katyushin was hospitalized due to illness on March 25 and was succeeded by his chief of staff, Col. Nikolai Fyodorovich Kusakin. This officer returned to his previous position on March 30 when Col. Mikhail Mefodevich Kolesnikov took over as acting commander from his position of deputy commander.

== Operation Bagration ==
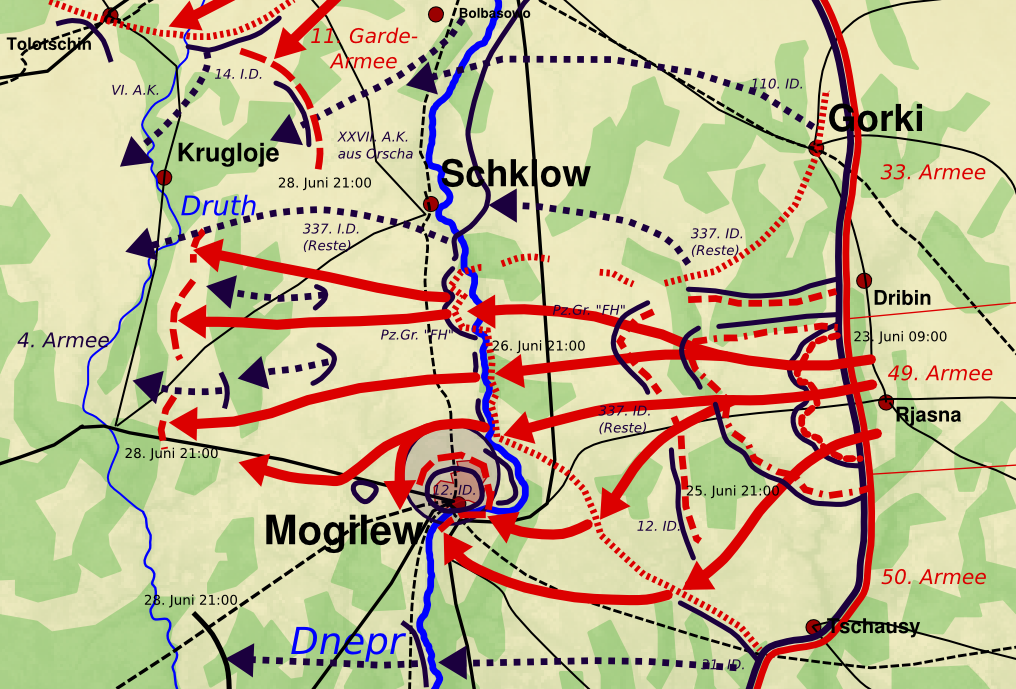
Operation Bagration, Mogilev sector

This scale of bloodletting, especially for such meager results, was more than the Red Army could sustain, and within two weeks Stalin had dismissed Sokolovskii. Western Front was split into the new 2nd and 3rd Belorussian Fronts, with 5th Army going to the latter. Colonel Katyushin returned from hospital on May 27, and Kolesnikov was reassigned as commander of the 70th Rifle Division; Kusakin remained as chief of staff. By this time the division had returned to 33rd Army in 2nd Belorussian Front, and was assigned to 62nd Rifle Corps.

In the buildup to the summer offensive 33rd Army was stripped of most of its forces, which were reassigned to 49th Army. In addition, a Front mobile group was formed under command of Lt. Gen. A. A. Tyurin, the deputy commander of 49th Army. It consisted of the 157th, the 13th Antitank Artillery Brigade, 23rd and 256th Tank Brigades, 1434th Self-Propelled Artillery Regiment (SU-85s), 1st Guards Engineer-Sapper Brigade, and the 87th Separate Mechanized Pontoon Battalion, plus staff from the field headquarters of the Front. Its objective, once the 49th reached the Basya River, would be to rapidly push ahead to the Dniepr and force a crossing. By the third day of the operation it was to be on the line Vysokoe–Staraya–Vodva–Senkovo, where it would hold until the arrival of the Army's main forces. Strong covering forces would be left near Bel and Mostok to hold off any German attacks from Orsha or Mogilev.

The operation began on the Front's sector on June 22 with a demonstration attack which was intended to pin 4th Army's XXXIX Panzer Corps in place. 33rd Army was on the north flank with minimal forces and was intended to simply screen its 50km line between the main attacks on Orsha and Mogilev. Overnight, the German defenses were subjected to heavy air attacks as 49th Army moved up its main forces for a morning attack. This made good progress following a powerful artillery preparation, but was hindered by difficult terrain which included many streams and rivers. By the evening the 337th Infantry Division had been badly damaged and its defenses had been penetrated to a depth of 8km on a 12km sector. As the assault continued on the morning of June 24 and now the 42nd Rifle Division broke through into the clear, reached and crossed the Basya. By 2130 hours on June 25 the 49th Army had broken the line held by Feldherrnhalle and the mobile group entered the road to Mogilev, approaching the Dniepr bridges by midnight. Only a German battlegroup consisting of an infantry battalion, an assault gun brigade and a tank destroyer battalion was delaying the advance. By the next evening 49th Army was over the Dniepr in strength and 4th Army finally received permission to evacuate the east bank bridgehead, but this came too late for most of its forces trapped there. On June 27 the mobile group, followed by elements of 49th and 50th Armies, broke into Mogilev from the northwest and street fighting began with the defending 12th Infantry Division. The city was cleared the next day, at the cost of considerable losses.

Meanwhile, the remainder of 62nd Corps plus the support elements of 33rd Army pushed over the Dniepr on the same day and threw the 25th Panzergrenadier and 110th Infantry Divisions back 15 km (9.3 mi) by evening. At about the same time 4th Army was ordered to pull back 50km to the Berezina River as quickly as possible due to the disasters that had befallen the German forces at Orsha and Babruysk. However, it was too late for 4th Army which had been badly depleted already, chiefly in battle with 49th Army. Under constant air attack and now hindered by the watery terrain that had previously shielded it, it was slow to cross the Berezina. Late on the morning of July 1 elements of 50th Army cut its retreat before advancing on Minsk, while 33rd Army was in battle with 5th and 14th Panzer Divisions plus two German battlegroups at Chernevka on the Berezina. By the end of the next day the bulk of 4th Army was being rounded up or desperately attempting to escape.

=== Baltic Offensives ===
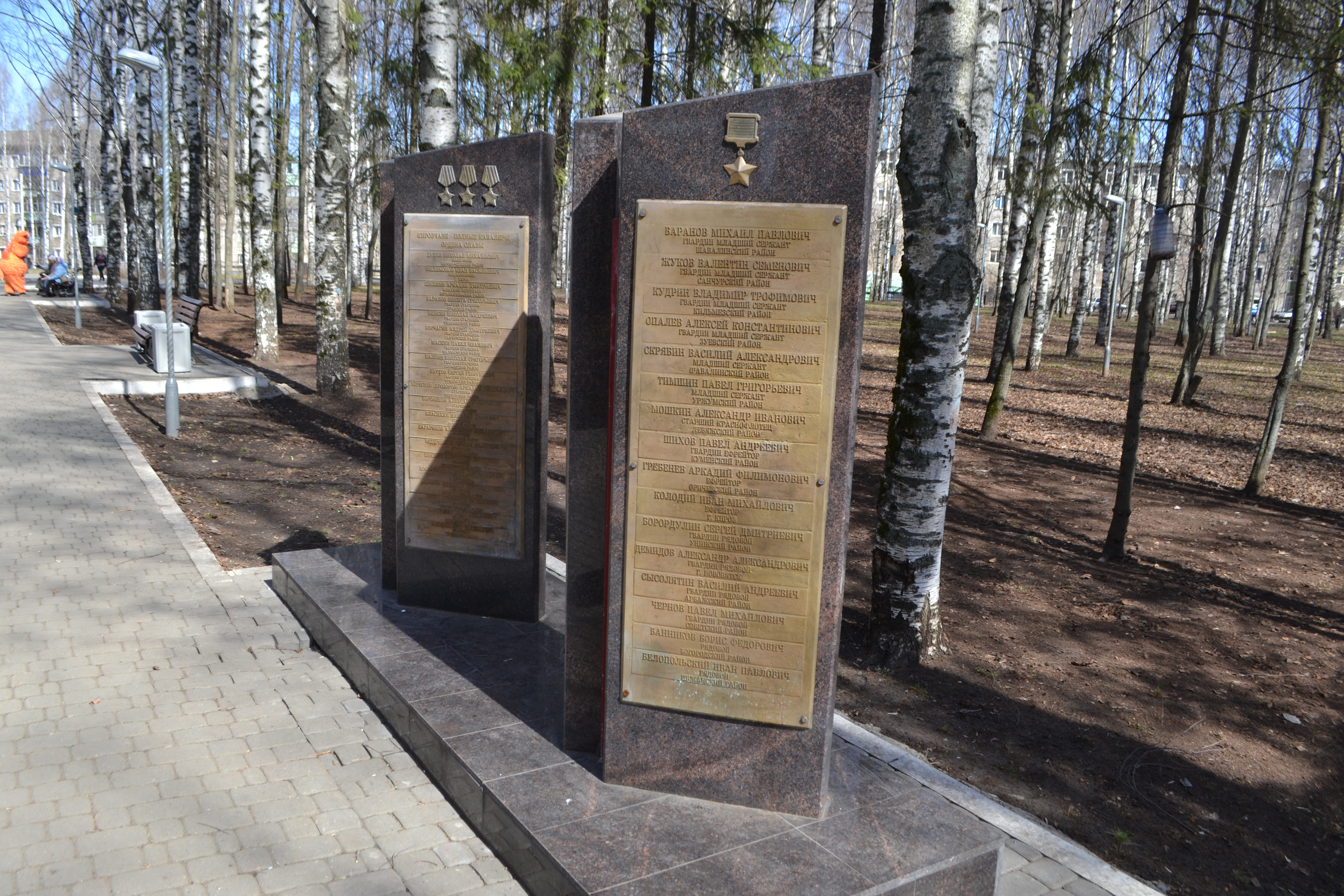
Monument in Kirov containing the name of Hero of the Soviet Union P. G. Timshin

The Front spent July 4 in regrouping in preparation of subsequent pursuit of the defeated German forces and eliminating those that were encircled. 62nd Corps had reached a line from Mostishche to Maltsy and was deployed facing south to cut the escape route to the north of the German Pekalin grouping. At midnight the next day the 157th, along with its Corps and Army, were reassigned to 3rd Belorussian Front. During July 6 the breakout attempts continued as the encircled forces were split into several groups. Fighting continued into July 9 while 33rd Army set up the perimeter defense of Minsk. The Front had already begun the Kaunas operation, which aimed to take that city as well as Vilnius, and force crossings of the Neman River, but initially 33rd Army remained in the Minsk area to secure the left wing of the Front. When its advance resumed the 633rd Rifle Regiment was struck by a counterattack at Bogryany, near Vilkaviškis. Jr. Sgt. Pavel Grigorievich Timshin commanded the crew of a heavy machine gun and directed fire which caused many German casualties. When the gun was destroyed he carried on fighting with grenades, despite being wounded three times. Following the battle he was evacuated to hospital where he underwent nine months of treatment before moving to airfield service in the rear for the duration. On March 24, 1945, he would be made a Hero of the Soviet Union. A former tractor driver, he was demobilized the same year and returned to the Kirov region where he worked in the mechanical trades until his retirement. He died on November 29, 2007, at the age of 82 and was buried at Kirov. Vilnius was cleared on July 13 after heavy fighting and this was followed by an advance of 50km toward Kaunas.

Part of 11th Guards Army reached the Neman on July 13 and seized several bridgeheads the next day. By July 15 the Front had forced the river on an overall frontage of 70km to a depth of up to 10km. The German command reacted strongly to this and the Front was forced over to the defense during July 20–28 before resuming the attack. On July 31 the 157th was recognized for its capture of the rail hub of Mariampol and the next day participated in taking Kaunas. This culminated on August 12 with the award of the honorific "Neman". The 633rd Regiment (Col. Mustafa Shakurovich Gafarov) had been awarded the battle honor "Kaunas" on August 1. By August 18, after two months of offensive operations, the rifle companies of the division averaged about 40 "bayonets" (riflemen and sappers) each. By the end of the month it had been withdrawn to the Front reserves (under 113th Rifle Corps) for rest and refitting. For a few weeks in late September and early October it was under 8th Guards Rifle Corps in 11th Guards Army before being moved to 5th Army, where it returned to 65th Rifle Corps. The division would remain in this Army into the postwar. While under 11th Guards it took part in the abortive Gumbinnen operation.

== East Prussian Offensives ==
Just prior to the winter offensive in January 1945 the 157th was reassigned back to 45th Rifle Corps, where it would remain into the postwar. The Corps now also contained the 159th and 184th Divisions. At the start of the Vistula-Oder Offensive on January 12, 5th Army was tasked with a vigorous attack in the direction of Mallwischken and Gross Skeisgirren, with the immediate task of breaking through the defense, then encircling and destroying the Tilsit group of forces in conjunction with the 39th Army. Progress proved slower than expected, with the German forces putting up fierce resistance. On the morning of January 14, 5th Army broke through the enemy's fourth trench line, and began to speed up the advance until the early afternoon, when heavy German counterattacks began. 65th Corps faced tank and infantry attacks from the 5th Panzer Division, which slowed, but did not halt, the advance. This sped up considerably on January 17 as 2nd Guards Tank Corps took up the running. 45th and 65th Corps had taken and consolidated the strongpoint of Radschen before advancing to a line from Mingschtimmen to Korellen, throwing the defenders out of the main positions of their Gumbinnen defense line. The last German reserves, including the 10th Motorized Brigade of nine assault gun companies, struck the boundary of the 45th and 72nd Rifle Corps before a fighting withdrawal to the west began. On February 19 the 157th would be awarded the Order of Kutuzov, 2nd Degree, for its role in breaking the defenses of East Prussia.

Despite these breakthroughs a core group of German forces continued to hold out against 5th and 28th Armies in the Gumbinnen–Insterburg area. General Krylov moved part of his 72nd Corps forces northward to attack in the Girren area, but this did not prove effective. 45th Corps joined this effort and advanced slowly with the 72nd and by 2100 hours the joint force had taken the defense line along the Tilsit–Gumbinnen paved road, moving up to the line Kraupischken–Neudorf–Antballen. 5th Army was ordered early on January 20 to push on to reach the Angerapp and Pissa Rivers with its main forces by the end of the day. On January 21, the Army was directed to encircle and destroy the German grouping defending Insterburg in conjunction with 11th Guards Army on the following day; 45th Corps was to attack towards Didlakken. By 0600 hours on January 22 Insterburg had been completely cleared. During the following week the Army continued to attack in the direction of Zinten. On February 19 the 633rd Regiment would be decorated with the Order of Kutuzov, 3rd Degree, for the taking of Insterburg.

On January 27, 45th Corps, attacking along the Army's right flank, reached the area of Uderwangen and turned to the southwest toward Preußisch Eylau, with 72nd Corps following. By this time most German forces in East Prussia were falling back toward Königsberg and its fortifications. The following morning the 45th was unexpectedly counterattacked by elements of XXVI Army Corps coming from the south. The German force included up to 35 tanks and assault guns, but was thrown back with losses. The 45th now pushed the attackers back to the south, forced a crossing of the Frisching River, and reached a line from Mühlhausen to Abswangen by the end of the day. Krylov exploited this success by committing 72nd Corps from behind the right flank toward Kreuzburg. On January 29 the 65th Corps turned its sector north of Friedland over to 28th Army and was moved to the left flank of 45th Corps before also beginning an attack to the south. The German forces continued to resist along the Heilsberg fortified line, and it was not until February 7 that 5th Army's forces were able to secure Kreuzburg. By March 12 the 157th was noted as having just 2,243 personnel on strength. On April 5 the 384th Rifle and 422nd Artillery Regiments would each receive the Order of Kutuzov, 3rd Degree, for their role in the capture of Heilsberg and Friedland.

=== Samland Offensive ===
On March 13 Colonel Katyushin was reassigned to command of the 173rd Rifle Division, and Colonel Kusakin again took over the top position in the 157th. In the last days of March the division took part in the final reduction of the German forces trapped near Heiligenbeil, and on April 26 the 716th Rifle Regiment would receive the Order of Suvorov, 3rd Degree, while the 150th Sapper Battalion was given the Order of the Red Star. By the start of April the Soviet forces had been significantly regrouped. 5th Army was holding a sector from Spallwitten to Reessen, southwest of Königsberg. The Army was not part of the Zemland Group of Forces and was therefore not tasked with taking part in the assault on the city, which was set to begin on April 6. Instead, it would take part in the mopping up of the German forces isolated in the Sambia Peninsula, which began on April 13. The 5th and 39th Armies were assigned to make the main attack in the direction of Fischhausen, which would split XXVIII Army Corps in half east to west. Following this, the northern and southern pockets would be defeated in detail, with the assistance of 43rd and 2nd Guards Armies. The attack began with an hour-long artillery preparation before the infantry advanced at 0800 hours. 5th Army, on the right flank, moved on Norgau and Rotenen, advanced 5km, and took more than 1,000 prisoners. A further 3km were gained the next day against stubborn resistance. By April 17 the entire peninsula had been cleared, and 5th Army was already being pulled out of the fighting. While it moved back to the nearest railheads, the Army was assigned to the Reserve of the Supreme High Command on April 19 as it entrained for the far east.

== Soviet invasion of Manchuria ==
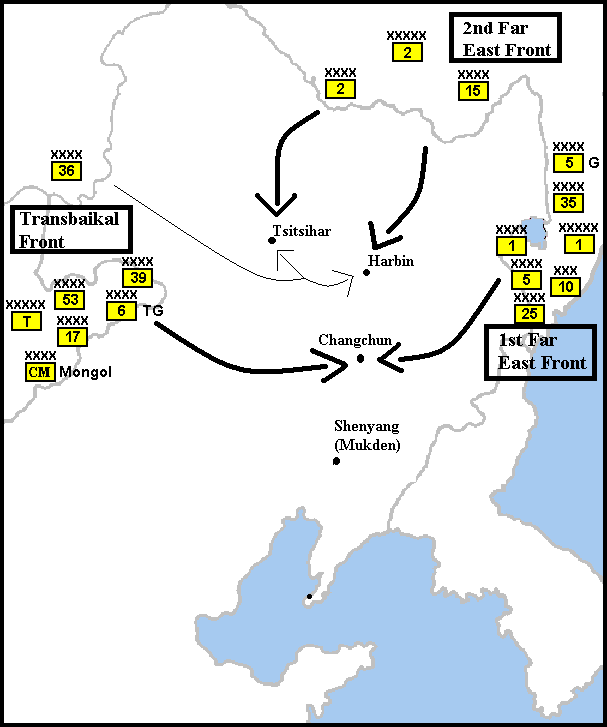
Invasion of Manchuria. Note route of 5th Army.

By the end of June the division was in the Maritime Group of the Far Eastern Front, which became the 1st Far Eastern Front at the beginning of August. When the offensive began on August 9 the 5th Army was tasked with making the Front's main attack. By day's end the Army had torn a gap 35km wide in the Japanese lines and had advanced anything from 16–22 km (9.9–13.7 mi) into the enemy rear, with 45th Corps in second echelon. Within three days the rifle regiments of the Corps' three divisions, backed by reinforcing sappers and self-propelled artillery, had liquidated all remaining strongholds in Volynsk, Suifenho, and Lumentai. The Army's other three corps advanced deep into Japanese-held territory against the retreating 124th Infantry Division. Mudanjiang was taken after a two-day battle on August 15–16, following which 5th Army pushed southwestward towards Ning'an, Tunghua and Kirin. On August 18 the Japanese capitulation was announced, and the Army deployed to accept and process the surrendering units.

== Postwar ==
On September 19 the division gained its second decoration, the Order of Suvorov, 2nd Degree, for its service against Japan, while the 716th Rifle and 422nd Artillery Regiments both received the Order of the Red Banner. The men and women of the division now shared the full title of 157th Rifle, Neman, Order of Suvorov and Kutuzov Division. (Russian: 157-я стрелковая Неманская орденов Суворова и Кутузова дивизия.) The division was disbanded in 1946 with the remainder of 45th Corps, being converted into the 9th Machine Gun/Artillery Division for coastal defense. Colonel Kusakin had been replaced in command in September 1945 by Col. Arsenii Ignatievich Gordienko, but this officer was reassigned in February 1946.
