= 63rd Mountain Rifle Division =

- Active: 1936–1942
- Country: Soviet Union
- Branch: Red Army
- Type: Division
- Role: Mountain Infantry
- Engagements: Anglo-Soviet invasion of Iran; Battle of the Kerch Peninsula
- Decorations: Order of the Red Star
- Battle honours: In the name of M. V. Frunze

Commanders
- Notable commanders: Maj. Gen. Aleksandr Markovich Krupnikov; Col. Semyon Georgievich Zakiyan; Lt. Col. Pyotr Yakovlevich Tsindzenevskii; Col. Matvei Vasilevich Vinogradov

The 63rd Mountain Rifle Division was formed as a specialized infantry division of the Red Army in July 1936, based on the 2nd Georgian Mountain Division. When the German invasion of the Soviet Union began it was in the Transcaucasus Military District and was soon assigned to the 47th Army for the invasion of Iran. Following this it was moved to the western Caucasus region where it joined the 44th Army of Crimean Front for amphibious operations against the Axis forces in the Crimea. In late December 1941 it landed at Feodosia as part of 9th Rifle Corps. Along with the remainder of the Corps the 63rd Mountain hindered but failed to block the retreat of Axis forces from Kerch, where the 51st Army had also made landings. After a German counteroffensive retook Feodosia in mid-January 1942 the division fell back to the Parpach Isthmus where it took part in trench warfare near the Black Sea coast into the spring, gradually losing strength. On May 8 it was caught up in the opening stage of Operation "Bustard Hunt" (Trappenjagd) and in a few hours was overwhelmed and largely destroyed by German air and artillery bombardment in support of infantry and armor attacks. Less than a week later it was stricken from the Red Army's order of battle and was never rebuilt.

== Formation ==
The division was officially converted from the 2nd Georgian Mountain Division at Tbilisi in the Transcaucasus Military District in July 1936 following the decision of the STAVKA to abolish "national" divisions and other such formations. By 1940 it was stationed at Kirovakan in the Armenian SSR. Based on the prewar shtat (table of organization and equipment) for mountain rifle divisions, as of June 22, 1941 its order of battle was as follows:

- 63rd Mountain Rifle Regiment
- 251st Mountain Rifle Regiment
- 291st Mountain Rifle Regiment
- 346th Mountain Rifle Regiment
- 26th Artillery Regiment
- 76th Antitank Battalion
- 273rd Antiaircraft Battery (later 347th Antiaircraft Battalion)
- 53rd Cavalry Squadron
- 170th Sapper Battalion
- 51st Signal Battalion
- 116th Medical/Sanitation Battalion
- 33rd Artillery Park Battalion
- 283rd Chemical Protection (Anti-gas) Company
- 400th Motor Transport Company
- 20th Field Bakery
- (unknown number) Field Postal Station
- 230th Field Office of the State Bank

From May 9, 1940 the division was under the command of Kombrig Aleksandr Markovich Krupnikov; this officer would have his rank modernized to major general on June 4. It inherited the Order of the Red Star that had been awarded to the 2nd Georgian on February 24, 1936 as well as the honorific "in the name of M. V. Frunze" that had been granted in April 1927. In common with other Soviet mountain divisions the 63rd had four regiments and no battalion structure. Instead each regiment had five rifle companies plus companies of supporting arms. This organization, designed for semi-independent operations in isolated mountain passes, also proved useful in amphibious operations.

== Invasion of Iran ==
By the start of August 1941 the 63rd Mountain had been assigned to the new 47th Army in Transcaucasus Military District, joining the 76th Mountain (former Armenian Mountain) and 236th Rifle plus the 6th and 54th Tank Divisions. Under the impact of Operation Barbarossa it was vital to ensure the safety of Allied supply lines to the USSR, secure Iranian oil fields and limit German influence in Iran.

The Soviet forces attacked jointly with British forces on August 25. The Red Army attacked using three armoured spearheads, totalling over 1,000 tanks and motorised infantry; the Iranians had no tanks in the area. 47th Army broke through the border and moved from Soviet Azerbaijan into Iranian Azerbaijan. It then moved towards Tabriz and Lake Urmia and soon captured the city of Jolfa. Following a delay there the Army moved south, capturing Dilman (100 km [62 mi] west of Tabriz) and then Urmia (Oromiyeh). On August 29 the Iranian forces accepted a ceasefire and the Soviet forces halted their advance on September 1 short of Tehran. During the rest of the month the 63rd Mountain was stationed at Maku. On September 28 General Krupnikov was moved to the first of many staff assignments he would hold until his retirement in 1958, eventually reaching the rank of lieutenant general. He was replaced in command of the division the next day by Col. Semyon Georgievich Zakiyan. As of the beginning of December it was still in 47th Army in Transcaucasus Front along with the 138th Mountain and the 392nd and 394th Rifle Divisions. On December 25 Colonel Zakiyan handed his command to Lt. Col. Pyotr Yakovlevich Tsindzenevskii.

== Battle of the Kerch Peninsula ==
On the same day the division again joined the active army, now in the 44th Army of the new Crimean Front. It was at virtually full strength, as follows:

- 13,240 personnel (of 14,158 authorized)
- 6,576 horses (of 6,742 authorized)
- 369 motor vehicles (of 418 authorized)
- 90 sub-machine guns (of 1,413 authorized)
- 334 light machine guns (of 348 authorized)
- 101 heavy machine guns (of 110 authorized)
- 28 antiaircraft machine guns (as authorized)
- 120 mortars (as authorized)
- 23 76mm mountain guns (of 32 authorized)
- 24 122mm howitzers (as authorized)
- 8 45mm antitank guns (as authorized)
- 4 37mm antiaircraft guns (of 8 authorized)
- 36 radios (of 56 authorized)
- 2 armored cars (not authorized)

Crimean Front began its operations to retake the Kerch Peninsula overnight on December 25/26 with landings in the vicinity of Kerch itself. This was followed on December 28/29 with further landings at the port city of Feodosia which took the defending German XXXXII Army Corps utterly by surprise. The assault was led by naval infantry detachments plus the 633rd Rifle Regiment of the 157th Rifle Division and by 0730 hours the German forces had completely lost control of the port. By the end of the day elements of three Red Army divisions were ashore, including the 251st and 291st Mountain Regiments. The response of the German Corps commander, Lt. Gen. H. von Sponeck, was one of near panic as the communications of his own 46th Infantry Division were in immediate danger of being cut off from the rest of the Crimea. He disobeyed orders from the headquarters of 11th Army and directed the 46th to retreat from the Kerch area despite the fact that nearly 20,000 Romanian troops were on hand to counterattack Feodosia.

Sponeck ordered two Romanian brigades to counterattack the Soviet lodgement (now organized as the 9th Rifle Corps) on December 30 but these troops, tired from countermarching and without artillery or air support, were quickly repulsed. 9th Corps now pushed northward to complete the isolation of XXXXII Corps. Over two days the 46th Infantry marched 120 km (75 mi) westward in a snowstorm; fuel shortages led to some motor vehicles being abandoned and heavy weapons lagged behind. When its lead elements reached the crossroads town of Vladislavovka they were shocked to find it held in strength by the 63rd Mountain Division. The German divisional commander ordered his lead regiments to crash through the position but this failed due to exhaustion and lack of artillery. Inexplicably the 9th Corps had left a 9km-wide gap between its pincer and the south shore of the Sea of Azov through which the German division was able to escape with light losses in personnel. By January 1, 1942 the XXXXII Corps had established a new line roughly 16 km (9.9 mi) west of Feodosia. An attack that day on the Corps command post at Ismail-Terek by infantry and T-26 tanks of 44th Army failed with the loss of 16 vehicles knocked out.

Despite this setback the Army appeared to be in a good position with 23,000 troops ashore and the Axis forces appearing weak and disorganized. The 236th Rifle Division was holding about 13 km (8.1 mi) west of Feodosia on the Biyuk-Eget ridge while the 63rd Mountain remained on the defense in and around Vladislavovka as the 51st Army moved up from the Kerch area. In fact the 44th Army was overextended and the Crimean Front was hampered by the inept leadership of Lt. Gen. D. T. Kozlov. By January 13 the commander of 11th Army, Gen. d. Inf. E. von Manstein, had concentrated more than four divisions outside Feodosia. His counteroffensive began at dawn on January 15, focused on the 236th which was badly defeated in a single day of fighting, in part because Kozlov was convinced the German objective was Vladislavovka and therefore concentrated most of his reserves to this sector. Feodosia fell to the Axis on January 17 and the 63rd Mountain then came under attack, losing its positions and being forced back toward the Black Sea as the XXX Army Corps attempted to isolate the 236th.

The 236th Rifle Division was soon annihilated with the 63rd Mountain and 157th Divisions being forced back to the Parpach Isthmus. After January 20 the two sides dug in along this 17km-wide line which soon acquired the characteristics of a WWI battlefield with extensive trenches, dugouts and barbed wire. 44th Army was effectively crippled and the addition of 51st Army did not allow Crimean Front to do more than hold its ground. On February 24 Lt. Colonel Tsindzenevskii handed his command to Col. Matvei Vasilevich Vinogradov, who would lead the division for the remainder of its existence. By the beginning of February the 9th Rifle Corps had been abolished and the 251st Mountain Regiment was serving as a separate regiment within 44th Army but later that month it returned to divisional command. From February 27 to April 11 Crimean Front launched a series of efforts to break out west of Parpach toward Sevastopol but these had little result beyond heavy Soviet casualties. 51st Army on the northern part of the line did most of this fighting with 44th Army offering diversionary support; as one further result the bulk of the Front's forces ended up massed on this northern flank. At the start of May the Army had the 63rd Mountain, 157th, 276th, 396th and 404th Rifle Divisions under command.

=== Operation Bustard Hunt ===
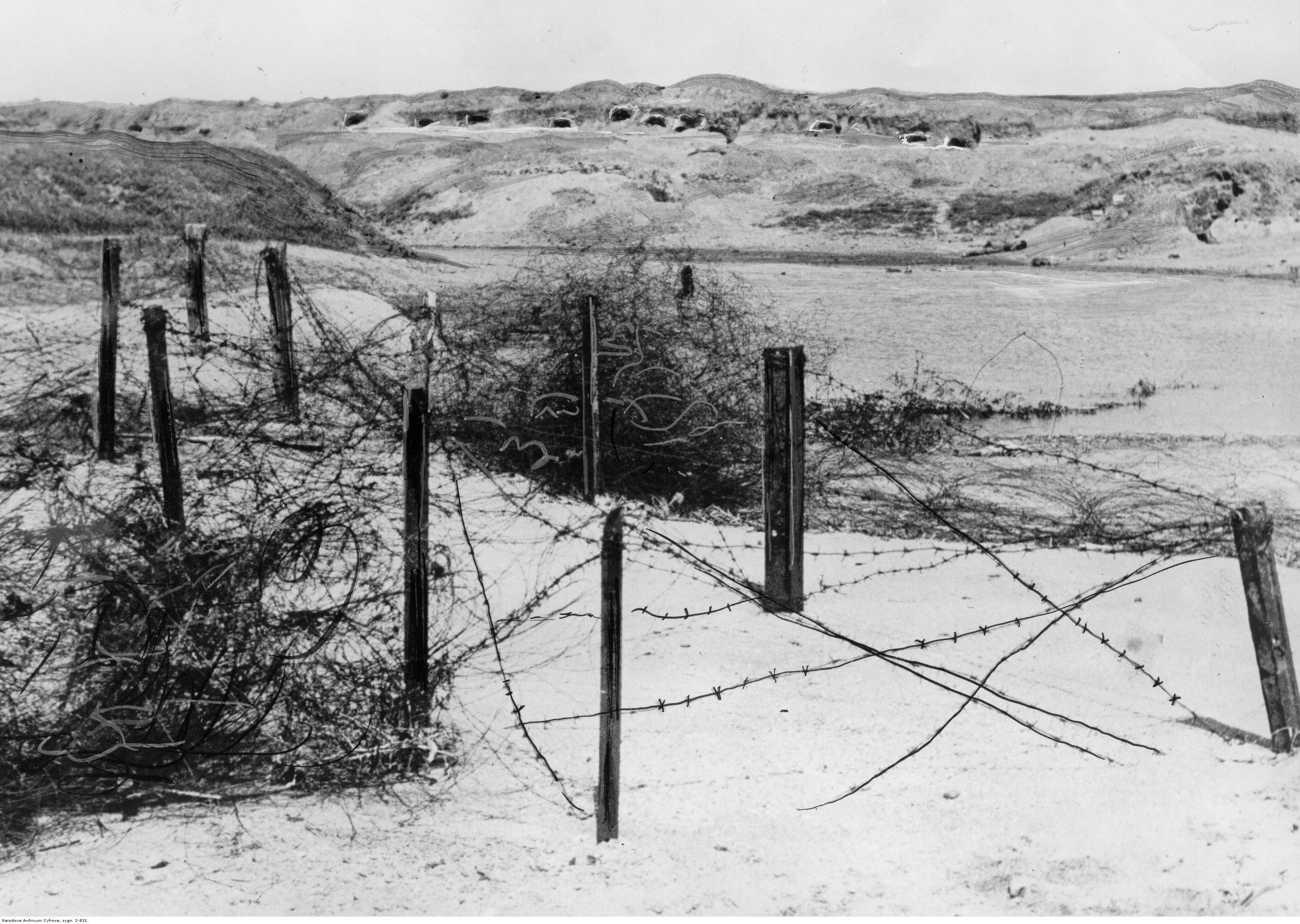
Red Army defenses on the Parpach Isthmus, May 1942

Before the last of these offensives ended General von Manstein began planning an operation to destroy all three armies of Crimean Front in one stroke. Operation Trappenjagd would initially target the 44th Army, which was defending a sector about 6 km (3.7 mi) long with five rifle divisions and two tank brigades. Although defenses in depth had been prepared, almost all the rifle units were deployed within 3 km (1.9 mi) of the front line. They were backed by an 11m-wide antitank ditch across the Parpach Isthmus which was protected by minefields, barbed wire and steel girders planted vertically. When the attack began on May 8 German airstrikes quickly achieved air superiority and a 10-minute artillery preparation on the 63rd Mountain and 276th Divisions began at 0415 hours. The 251st Mountain Regiment held a very strong position on the 40m high "Tatar Hill" north of the Feodosia–Kerch road but was not entirely tied in with the 346th Regiment to the south. Ju 87 dive bombers of Sturzkampfgeschwader 77 blasted the top of the hill just as troops of the 28th Jäger Division left their start line. Shortly after the air attacks ended one regiment of the Jäger division, supported by 21 StuG III Ausf. B assault guns and 18 captured Soviet tanks, was able to first bypass and then overwhelm the isolated 346th Regiment. About 3 km (1.9 mi) to the south the lead regiments of the 132nd Infantry Division and 22 assault guns overran the strongpoints of the 291st Regiment on the coast by 0445 hours. After "Tatar Hill" was taken the leading German forces reached the west side of the antitank ditch about an hour later and the 49th Jäger Regiment had forced a crossing by 0755 hours in the face of scattered resistance from isolated Red Army units. In only three-and-a-half hours the 63rd Mountain's front line regiments had been irreparably shattered. Meanwhile, a flotilla of assault boats landed a German force 1,500m behind the antitank ditch to disrupt the second echelon defenses. Overnight the ditch was bridged, and late on the 9th Manstein was able to commit the 22nd Panzer Division which by the middle of the next day reached the Sea of Azov, cutting off the 51st Army as well as the remnants of the 44th. The what remained of the division was devastated in this mayhem and while some of its men were among the approximately 50,000 evacuated from Crimea to the Taman Peninsula, the 63rd Mountain had already effectively ceased to exist and was officially disbanded on May 13.
