= 276th Division =

276th Division may refer to:

- 276th Volksgrenadier Division, Wehrmacht, Germany
- 276th Rifle Division, Soviet Union

== See also ==
- List of military divisions by number
