= 76 mm mountain gun M1958 (2A2) =

Soviet mountain gun designed during the 1950s

76 mm mountain gun M1958 2A2
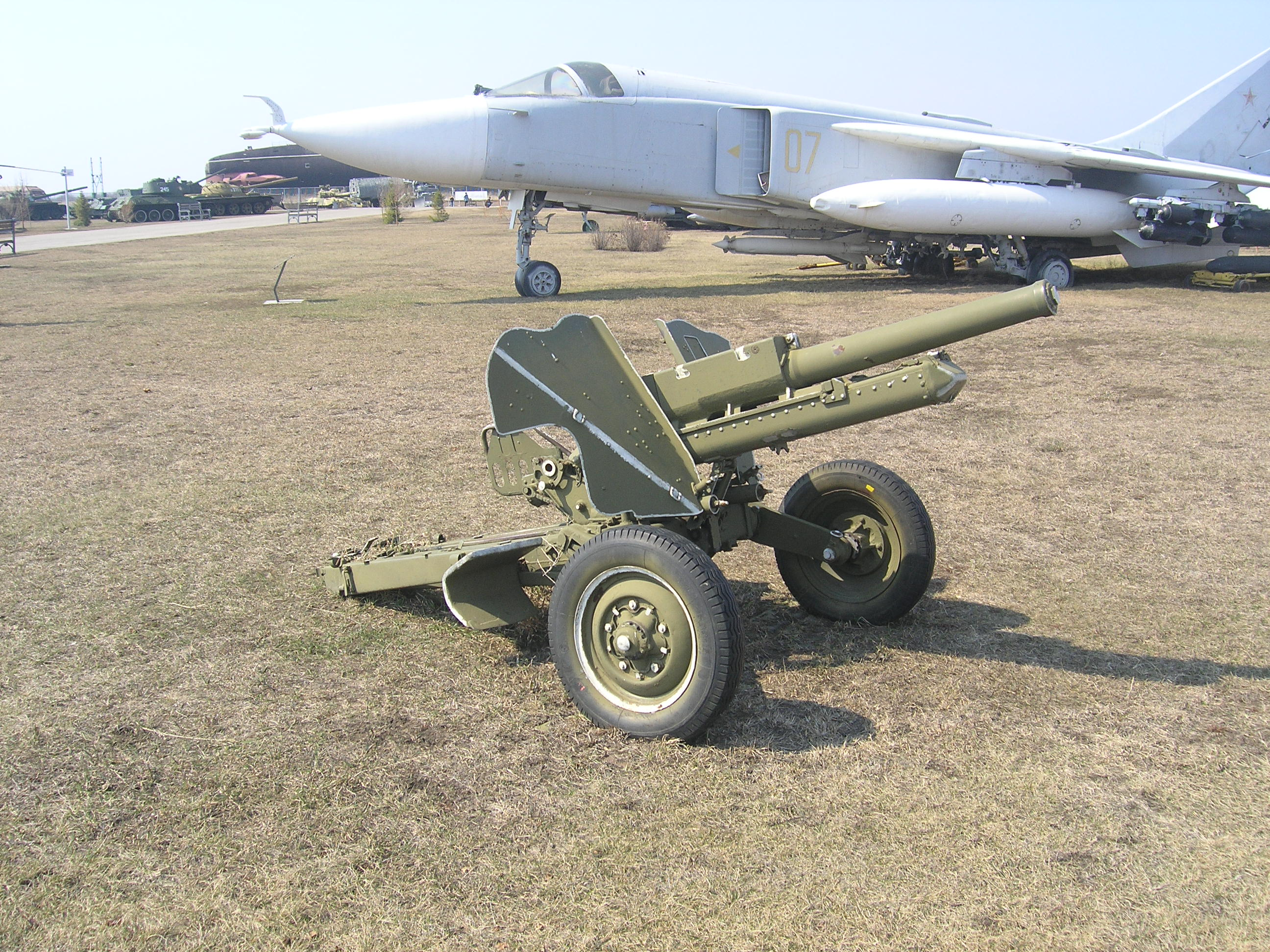
- A 2A2 in the Technical Museum Of Togliatti
- Type: Mountain gun Airborne gun
- Place of origin: Soviet Union

Service history
- Used by: Soviet Union

Production history
- Designer: Plant № 172
- Designed: 1951
- Manufacturer: Plant № 172
- Produced: 1958

Specifications
- Mass: Travel: 750 kg (1,650 lb); Firing: 735 kg (1,620 lb)
- Length: Travel: 3.3 m (10 ft 10 in); Firing: 4.2 m (13 ft 9 in)
- Barrel length: 1.63 m (5 ft 4 in) L/21.4
- Width: 1.62 m (5 ft 4 in)
- Height: Travel: 1.4 m (4 ft 7 in); Firing: 1 m (3 ft 3 in)
- Shell: Semi-Fixed QF
- Shell weight: 6.23 kg (13 lb 12 oz)
- Caliber: 76.2 mm (3.00 in)
- Breech: Semi-automatic horizontal sliding block
- Recoil: Hydro-pneumatic
- Carriage: Split trail
- Elevation: -10 to +70 degrees
- Traverse: -45 to +45 degrees
- Rate of fire: 10-20 RPM
- Muzzle velocity: 485 m/s (1,590 ft/s)
- Maximum firing range: 10 km (6.2 mi)

The 76 mm mountain gun M1958 (M-99, GP or 2A2) was a Soviet mountain gun designed during the 1950s.

== History ==
Developed by SKB-172 under the guidance of Mikhail Yurievich Tsirulnikov. The M-99 passed factory tests in December 1954 and passed military tests on 21 April 1955.

The M-99 was officially adopted in 1958 under the name 76 mm GP mountain gun. At this time, a new indexing of guns was introduced, and the M-99 received the GRAU index number 2A2.

== Design ==
The barrel is the same as the 76 mm mountain gun model 1938. It has a split-trail carriage, a hydro-pneumatic recoil mechanism, a semi-automatic horizontal sliding wedge breech, torsion bar suspension, and pneumatic tires for motor transport. The gun is collapsible or can be broken down into 10 pack loads for transport.

== Surviving examples ==
- Museum of the History of PJSC Motovilikha Plants, Perm.
- Museum of Russian Military History, Moscow.
- UMMC Museum Complex, Sverdlovsk.
- Central Museum of the Armed Forces of the Russian Federation, Moscow.
- Tula Artillery Engineering Institute, Tula.
- Omsk Cadet Military Corps, Omsk.

== Ammunition ==
| Designation | Type |
|---|---|
| 53-VOF-356 | HEF |
| 53-UBK-356 | HEAT |
| 53-UBK-356M | HEAT |
| 53-UBP-356 | AP |
| 53-UBP-356A | AP |
| 53-UBP-356M | AP |
| 53-UBR-356 | AP-T |
| 53-UBR-356A | AP-T |
| 53-UBR-356B | AP-T |
| 53-UBR-356SP | AP-T |
| 53-UD-356 | Smoke |
| 53-UD-356A | Smoke |
| 53-UZ-356 | Incendiary |
| 53-UO-356A | Frag |
| 53-UOF-356 | HE |
| 53-UOF-356A | HE |
| 53-UOF-356AM | HE |
| 53-UOF-356M | HE |
| 53-UOKh-356 | Fragmentation-Chemical |
| 53-USh-356 | Shrapnel |
| 53-USh-356T | Shrapnel |

== See also ==
- 76 mm mountain gun M48 — A similar Yugoslavian Cold War design
- OTO Melara Mod 56 — A similar Italian Cold War design
- M116 howitzer — A similar American WWII design
