= Motovilikha Plants =

Russian metallurgical and military equipment manufacturer

Coordinates: 58°02′06″N 56°18′00″E

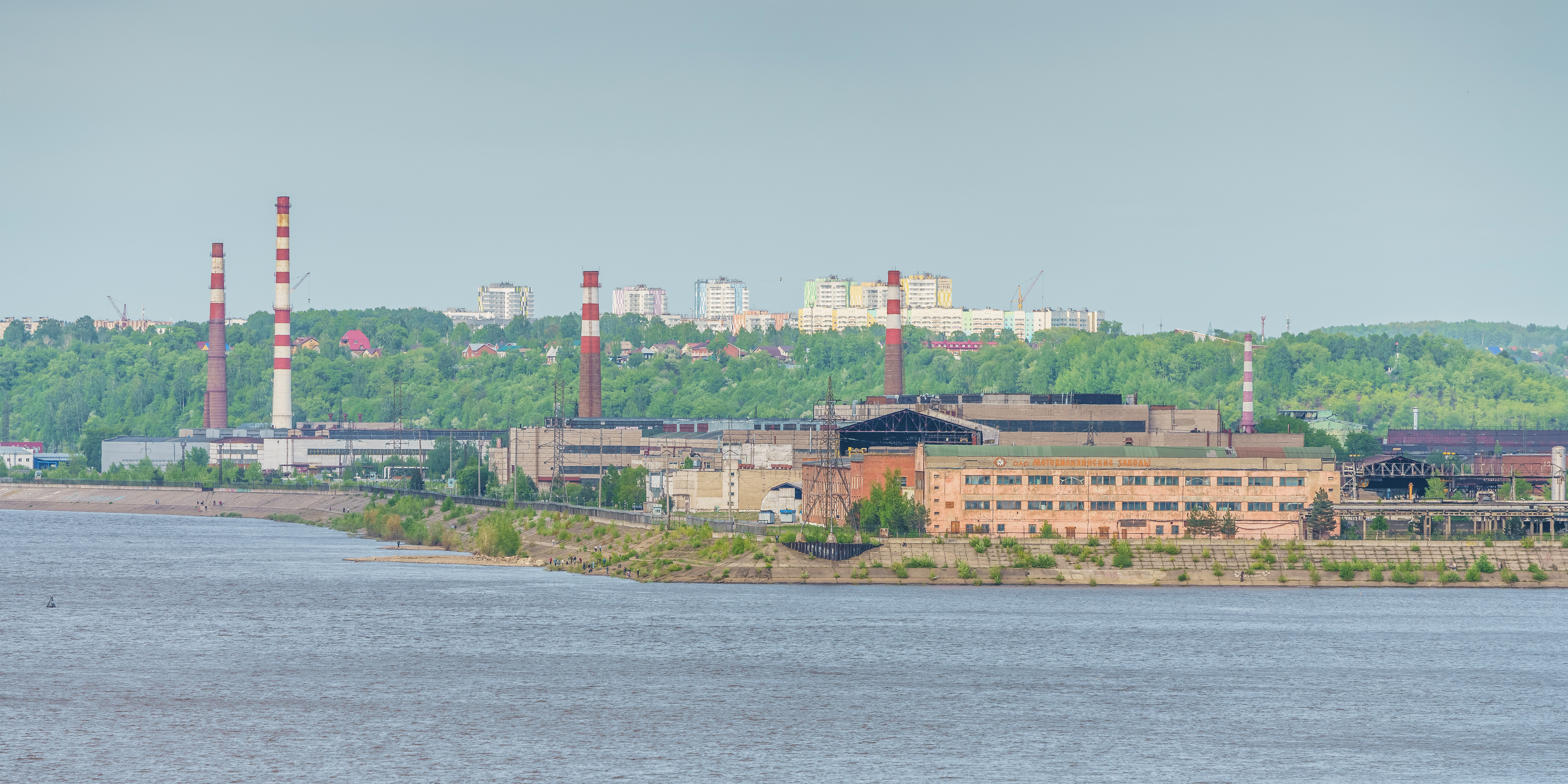
- Remote view of Motovilikha Plants
- Native name: Мотовилихинские заводы
- Type: Public company
- Industry: Defense industry
- Founded: 1736
- Headquarters: Perm, Russia
- Products: Artillery, Self-propelled artillery, Howitzers, Multiple rocket launchers, Military vehicles
- Revenue: $17 million (2016)
- Operating income: −$26.8 million (2016)
- Net income: −$48.7 million (2016)
- Total assets: $283 million (2016)
- Total equity: −$72.7 million (2016)
- Owner: Rostec (39.9%); NPO Splav (10%)
- Website: mz.perm.ru

PJSC Motovilikha Plants / Motovilikhinskiye Zavody PAO (MOTZ, MOTZ.MM) (Russian: Мотовилихинские заводы; MCX: MOTZ) is a Russian metallurgical and military equipment manufacturer. In 2016 Motovilikha Plants joined NPO Splav, a Rostec company. It is named after the former town of Motovilikha, where it's located, which in 1938 was amalgamated into the city of Perm. The town in turn was named after the eponymous river, a small Kama tributary.

== History ==
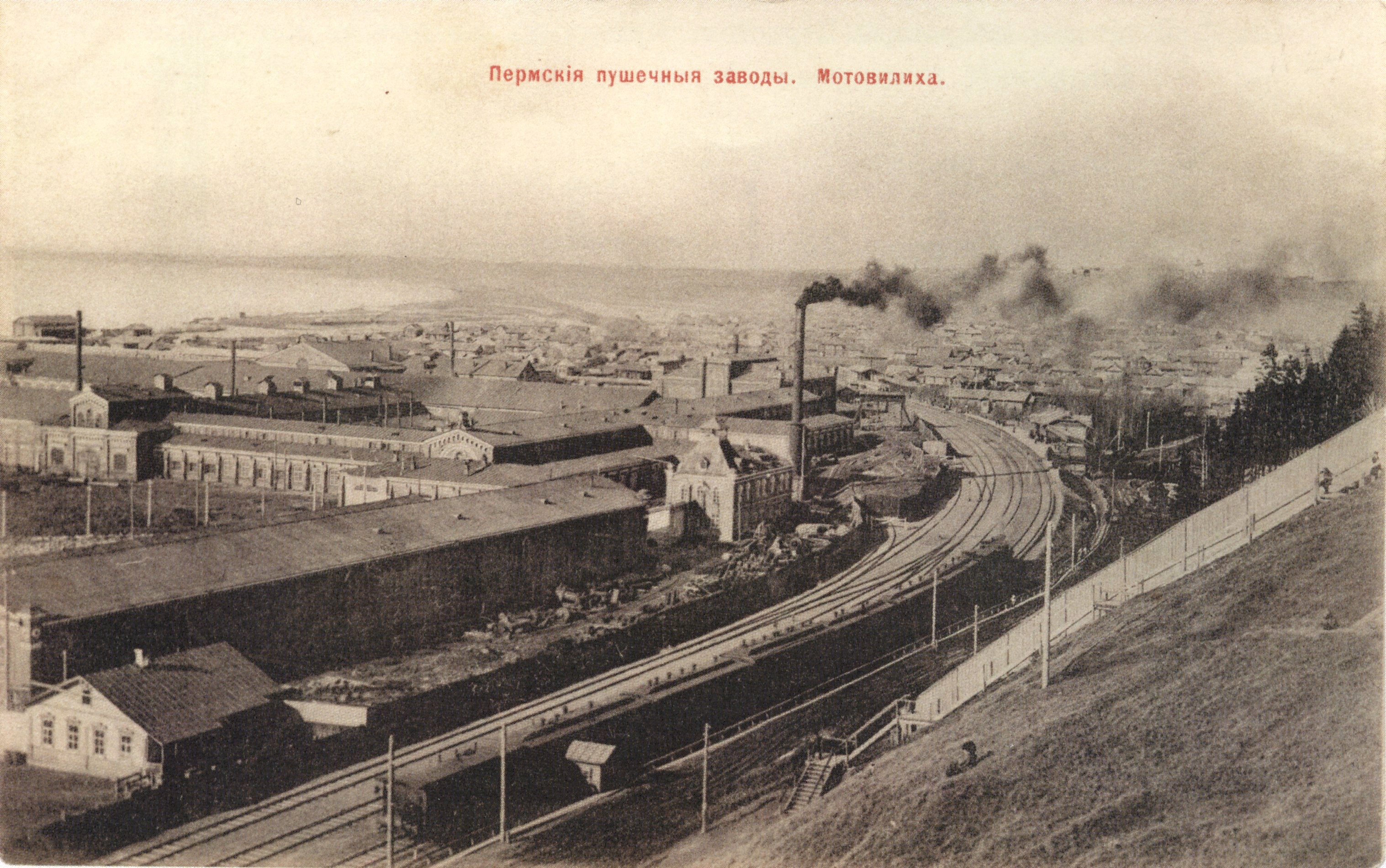
Motovilikha Plants in 1900

The origins of the plant can be traced back to the year 1736, when Empress Anna issued a decree to establish a smelter with the purpose of producing steel. This steel was specifically intended to be used in nearby factories that were operational during that time. The main objective was to supply steel blocks that would be utilized in the manufacturing of rifles and guns. As the 18th century drew to a close, the production of weapons commenced in the village of Motovilikha as a response to the growing demand. These guns manufactured in Motovilikha played a significant role in various conflicts that Russia participated in during the first half of the 19th century, including the infamous Napoleonic Wars and the Crimean War.

During the latter part of the 19th century, there was a growing push to introduce industrial manufacturing practices in Russia. This endeavor culminated in the year 1871, when all the metal smelters and weapons workshops in the area were merged into one centralized facility situated in the city of Perm.

The plant launched the first steamship in the Urals, in 1871, and the first steam locomotive the following year. In 1893, Nikolay Slavyanov, an exceptional individual working at the plant, revolutionized the welding industry by introducing shielded metal arc welding. In 1914, the factory had reached a level of production where they were responsible for manufacturing every third cannon that was being produced in Russia.

The plant was nationalized by a decree of the Supreme Council of the National Economy on October 2, 1918. Formerly known as the Motovilikha Mechanical Plant. During the early Soviet era, the factories were utilized for the production of a diverse array of machinery, encompassing machine tools, cranes, and construction equipment. It repaired steam locomotives, automobiles, and tractors, and manufactured agricultural machinery, internal combustion engines, artillery pieces, and shells. From 1921, it was known as the Motovilikha Ordnance Plant, and from 1927, the Motovilikha Machine-Building Plant. In 1934, the plant was renamed State Union Plant No. 172 named after Vyacheslav Molotov. In 1957, the plant was renamed the Perm Machine-Building Plant named after Vladimir Lenin.

Following the onset of World War II, the factory reverted back to manufacturing heavy weaponry, prioritizing the production of civilian equipment only once the war had concluded. In 1941, the plant was awarded the Order of Lenin, in 1944, the Order of the Red Banner of Labour, and in 1945, the Order of the Patriotic War, 1st Class. During the Great Patriotic War, the Perm Motovilikha Plants manufactured a quarter of all artillery systems for the Red Army. The first shot at Nazi Germany on August 2, 1944, was fired from a 152-mm ML-20 No. 3922 howitzer-gun, manufactured in Perm at the Motovilikha Plant, and the first shot at Berlin on April 20, 1945, was fired from a 122-mm A-19 No. 501 corps gun, also manufactured in Perm.

=== Russian Federation ===
By order of the Government of Russia on December 5, 1992, the enterprise was transformed into Motovilikha Plants JSC. In 1993, the Perm Krai Property Fund held a voucher auction to sell the shares of Motovilikha Plants JSC. At that time, the plant employed more than 20,000 people. The plant came under the control of plant director Yuri Bulaev.

In 2002–2003, the plant changed hands, coming under the control of ZAO Financial House Rus. By order of the Russian Government on August 20, 2009, PAO Motovilikha Plants was included in the list of strategic organizations. In 2011, a large stake was acquired by Uralvagonzavod Corporation, through which the company was transferred to the state corporation Rostec.

In 2013, a criminal case was opened against former shareholder Marat Zagidullov for fraud, which caused damages to Motovilikha Plants amounting to 1.2 billion rubles. In early August 2017, the company entered bankruptcy proceedings—the Perm Krai court placed the plant under observation.[16] In 2018, the company was declared bankrupt, and bankruptcy proceedings were initiated. In September 2023, the assets of Motovilikha Plants were purchased by the Naberezhnye Chelny-based armored vehicle plant Remdizel.

In January 2024, the Prosecutor General's Office filed a lawsuit for 3.83 billion rubles against eight defendants suspected of stripping the company of its assets and taking out loans, which ultimately led to its bankruptcy. Among the defendants is Marat Zagidullov.[17]

The year 2011 marked the establishment of a state-of-the-art production line for artillery at the plant. However, things took a turn for the worse in March 2018, when bankruptcy proceedings were initiated against the company. Consequently, the company was forced to delist from the stock market, thereby undergoing a significant setback.

In September 2023, the property of Motovilikha Plants was purchased by the Tatarstan armored vehicles plant Remdizel.

== Operation ==
PJSC Motovilikha Plants unites metallurgical and machine-building production facilities. Motovilikha — Civil Engineering LLC produces metallurgical products (forgings, stampings, rolled products), SKB CJSC produces defense equipment (artillery guns, mortars and multiple rocket launchers). They are the developer and the only manufacturer in Russia of combat and transport-loading vehicles from multiple launch rocket systems such as Grad, Smerch and their modified versions Tornado-G, Tornado-S, produce self-propelled artillery guns Nona-SVK, Vienna, towed howitzersMsta-B, Nona-M1 mortars and other artillery systems.

Main production units: Motovilikha-Civil Engineering LLC, SKB CJSC, Teplo-M LLC.

== Products ==
- 130 mm towed field gun M1954 (M-46)
- 9A52-4 Tornado
- 2S9 Nona
- 152 mm towed gun-howitzer M1955 (D-20)
- 122 mm gun M1931/37 (A-19)
- 122 mm howitzer M1938 (M-30)
- 76 mm mountain gun M1958 (2A2)

== Owners and management ==
The authorized capital of the company is 1.49 billion rubles. As of March 31, 2014, 39.9% of the shares of the Motovilikhinsky Plants group of enterprises belonged to State Corporation "Rostec", the other owners owned shares in approximately equal shares.

Sergey Dyadkin was the Managing Director of PJSC Motovilikhinsky Plants until January 25, 2024.
