= 396th Rifle Division =

- Active: 1941 - 1945
- Country: Soviet Union
- Branch: Red Army
- Type: Division
- Role: Infantry
- Engagements: Battle of the Kerch Peninsula; Soviet invasion of Manchuria

Commanders
- Notable commanders: Col. Vladimir Yosifovich Grigorovich; Col. Gelb Nikolaievich Korchikov; Col. Spiridon Matveevich Fochkin

The 396th Rifle Division was created in 1941 as an infantry division of the Red Army and was activated twice during the Great Patriotic War. The division followed a very similar combat path to that of the 398th Rifle Division in its 1st formation. It was first formed in August in the Transcaucasus Military District. In January 1942 it was moved to the Crimea where it joined first the 47th and then the 44th Armies in Crimean Front. On 8 May it came under attack by the German 11th Army as part of Operation Trappenjagd and by the end of the month it was destroyed in the Kerch peninsula, being officially disbanded on 14 June. In the buildup to the Soviet invasion of Manchuria a new 396th was formed in the Far Eastern Front in early 1945. The new division was one of only three formed in 1945 and served with the 2nd Red Banner Army, crossing the Amur River on 11 August and helping to reduce a Japanese fortified zone while also marching towards central Manchuria. Its rifle regiments were all decorated for their achievements and the division was disbanded before the end of the year.

== 1st Formation ==
The 396th began forming on 19 August 1941 at Kusary, Azerbaijan, in the Transcaucasus Military District. Its order of battle, based on the first wartime shtat (table of organization and equipment) for rifle divisions, was as follows:

- 803rd Rifle Regiment
- 816th Rifle Regiment
- 819th Rifle Regiment
- 957th Artillery Regiment
- 175th Antitank Battalion
- 185th Antiaircraft Battery (later 681st Antiaircraft Battalion)
- 679th Mortar Battalion
- 456th Reconnaissance Company
- 675th Sapper Battalion
- 845th Signal Battalion
- 479th Medical/Sanitation Battalion
- 472nd Chemical Protection (Anti-gas) Company
- 509th Motor Transport Company
- 355th Field Bakery
- 819th Divisional Veterinary Hospital
- 1452nd Field Postal Station
- 724th Field Office of the State Bank

Col. Vladimir Yosifovich Grigorovich was assigned to command of the division on the day it formed, and he would remain in command until 30 October. In September it was noted that 70 percent of its personnel were of various Caucasian nationalities. It continued forming under the military district headquarters into November, coming under the command of Col. Gelb Nikolaievich Korchikov on the first day of that month; he would officially remain in this post until the division was disbanded. A few weeks later it was assigned to 51st Army in Transcaucasus Front.

=== Battle of the Kerch Peninsula ===
In late January the 396th crossed into Crimea via the ice road that had been built across the Kerch Strait, and on 28 January the 51st Army was subordinated to the new Crimean Front. In February the division was reassigned to the new 47th Army, which was a second echelon holding formation at the time, indicating that the 396th was not yet considered ready for combat. In March the division was shifted to the front lines in 44th Army, however in the four offensives conducted by the Front between 27 February and 11 April this Army took little part.

Before the fourth offensive ended the commander of German 11th Army, General Erich von Manstein, began planning an operation to destroy all three armies of Crimean Front in one stroke. Operation Trappenjagd would initially target the 44th Army, which was defending a sector about 6 km (3.7 mi) long with five rifle divisions and two tank brigades. Although defenses in depth had been prepared, almost all the rifle units were deployed within 3 km (1.9 mi) of the front line, while the 396th was in reserve with the tanks. When the attack began on 8 May German airstrikes quickly achieved air superiority and a 10-minute artillery preparation on the 63rd Mountain and 276th Rifle Divisions began at 0415 hours. Meanwhile, a flotilla of assault boats landed a German force 1,500m behind the anti-tank ditch across the Parpach Narrows to disrupt the second echelon defenses. Overnight the ditch was bridged, and late on the 9th Manstein was able to commit the 22nd Panzer Division which by the middle of the next day reached the Sea of Azov, cutting off the 51st Army as well as the remnants of the 44th. The division was caught up in this mayhem and while some of its men were among the approximately 50,000 evacuated from Crimea to the Taman Peninsula, Colonel Korchikov was moved to command of the 236th Rifle Division on 30 May, and the 396th was officially stricken from the Red Army order of battle on 14 June.

== 2nd Formation ==
Nearly three years after the disbandment of the original division a new 396th was formed on 13 March 1945 in the 2nd Red Banner Army of the Far Eastern Front. It and the 2nd formation of the 345th Rifle Division were the last two regular rifle divisions formed during the war. It had an entirely different order of battle from the 1st formation:

- 500th Rifle Regiment
- 586th Rifle Regiment
- 614th Rifle Regiment
- 219th Artillery Regiment
- 485th Self-Propelled Gun Battalion
- 68th Antitank Battalion
- 182nd Reconnaissance Company
- 155th Sapper Battalion
- 143rd Signal Company
- 280th Medical/Sanitation Battalion
- 254th Chemical Protection (Anti-gas) Company
- 558th Motor Transport Company
- 475th Field Bakery
- 423rd Divisional Veterinary Hospital
- 3183rd Field Postal Station
- 2003rd Field Office of the State Bank

Col. Spiridon Matveevich Fochkin was appointed to command on the day the division re-formed, and remained in command for the duration.

=== Soviet invasion of Manchuria ===
At the start of the Manchurian operation the 2nd Red Banner Army was on the right (or west) flank of the new 2nd Far Eastern Front, deployed opposite the Japanese fortified positions at Aihun and Sunwu. The 396th formed an operational group at Blagoveshchensk with the 368th Mountain Rifle Regiment and 258th Tank Brigade with the goals of securing the Aihun fortified region and then advancing south to Nencheng and eventually Qiqihar. While the overall offensive began on 9 August, the 2nd Red Banner Army remained on the defensive for the first two days, conducting reconnaissance and seizing islands in the Amur River.

Early in the morning of 11 August forward detachments of the operational groups, under the cover of an artillery preparation and in concert with the Zey-Bureisk Brigade of the Amur River Flotilla, landed at Heiho, Sakhalin, Aihun and Holomoching and established footholds allowing the main forces to cross. Due to a lack of crossing equipment it took until 16 August to transport all units across the river. By the 13th sufficient forces were available to develop the offensive. The 396th and its operational group pushed the Japanese 135th Independent Mixed Brigade towards the main Aihun fortified region, and surrounded it there in bitter fighting on 14 and 15 August. At the same time it sent out a forward detachment formed around the 258th Tanks to pursue Japanese forces retreating along the Nencheng road. On the 16th the task of reducing the fortifications was handed to the heavy artillery, supported by the 101st Fortified Region and the 614th Rifle Regiment, while the balance of the division joined the southward advance. The Aihun position continued resistance until 20 August when its remaining 4,520 men surrendered. The advance was slowed by bad roads and worse weather, but on the same day Nencheng was secured and after the formal Japanese surrender the march became administrative, continuing on towards Qiqihar and Harbin.

On 14 September all three rifle regiments of the division were awarded the Order of the Red Star for their efforts in the offensive. The division was disbanded at the same time its superior command, the 2nd Red Banner Army, was disbanded in November - December 1945.
