= Škoda 75 mm Model 1936 =

- Type: Mountain gun
- Place of origin: Czechoslovakia

Service history
- Wars: World War II

Production history
- Designer: Škoda
- Manufacturer: Škoda
- Variants: 76 mm mountain gun M1938

Specifications
- Mass: 785 kg (1,731 lb)
- Barrel length: 1.43 m (4 ft 8 in) L/18.7
- Shell weight: 6.23 kg (13.7 lb)
- Caliber: 75 mm (2.95 in)
- Breech: Vertical sliding-wedge
- Carriage: Box-trail
- Elevation: -8° to +65°
- Traverse: 7°
- Rate of fire: 4 rpm
- Muzzle velocity: 495 m/s (1,620 ft/s)
- Maximum firing range: 10 km (6.2 mi)

The Škoda 75 mm Model 1936 (75 mm M.36) was a mountain gun manufactured by Škoda Works, in Czechoslovakia, and a variant was produced in Soviet Union (as the 76 mm mountain gun M1938). Škoda also produced a handful of the 76.2 mm variant. For transport, the gun could be broken down into three sections, and further broken down into ten loads. The gun crew was protected by an armoured shield.
