= 398th Rifle Division =

398th Rifle Division (August 15, 1941 – May 19, 1942)
- Active: 1941 - 1942
- Country: Soviet Union
- Branch: Red Army
- Type: Division
- Role: Infantry
- Engagements: Battle of the Kerch Peninsula

Commanders
- Notable commanders: Col. Yakov Lvovich Steyman; Col. Kasim Mukamedyarovich Mukamedyarov

The 398th Rifle Division was raised in 1941 as an infantry division of the Red Army, and served briefly during the Second World War in that role. The division followed a very similar combat path to that of the 396th Rifle Division in that unit's 1st formation. It was first formed in August in the Transcaucasus Military District. In January, 1942 it was moved to the Crimea where it joined the 44th Army in Crimean Front. On May 8, now in the 51st Army, it came under attack by the German 11th Army as part of Operation Trappenjagd and within days it was destroyed in the Kerch peninsula, being officially disbanded on May 19 after one of the briefest careers of any Soviet division. The 398th was never reformed.

== Formation ==
The 398th began forming on August 19, 1941, at Kirovabad, Azerbaijan, in the Transcaucasus Military District. Its order of battle, based on the first wartime shtat (table of organization and equipment) for rifle divisions, was as follows:

- 821st Rifle Regiment
- 824th Rifle Regiment
- 826th Rifle Regiment
- 958th Artillery Regiment
- 176th Antitank Battalion
- 186th Antiaircraft Battery (later 682nd Antiaircraft Battalion)
- 680th Mortar Battalion
- 457th Reconnaissance Company
- 676th Sapper Battalion
- 846th Signal Battalion
- 480th Medical/Sanitation Battalion
- 473rd Chemical Protection (Anti-gas) Company
- 510th Motor Transport Company
- 245th Field Bakery
- 820th Divisional Veterinary Hospital
- 1453rd Field Postal Station
- 725th Field Office of the State Bank

Col. Yakov Lvovich Steyman was assigned to command of the division on the day it formed, and he would remain in command until March 13, 1942. It continued forming under the military district headquarters into November when it was assigned to 51st Army but remained under the military district.

=== Battle of the Kerch Peninsula ===
In late January the 398th crossed into Crimea via the ice road that had been built across the Kerch Strait, and was assigned to 44th Army which was subordinated to the new Crimean Front on January 28. On March 14 Col. Steyman was replaced in command by Col. Kasim Mukamedyarovich Mukamedyarov. By April 1 it had returned to 51st Army, which had done most of the fighting in the four offensives conducted by the Front between February 27 and April 11 and had suffered casualties accordingly.

Before the fourth offensive ended the commander of German 11th Army, General Erich von Manstein, began planning an operation to destroy all three armies of Crimean Front in one stroke. Operation Trappenjagd would initially target the 44th Army, which was defending a sector about 6 km long with five rifle divisions and two tank brigades. Although defenses in depth had been prepared, almost all the rifle units were deployed within 3 km of the front line. When the attack began on May 8 German airstrikes quickly achieved air superiority and a 10-minute artillery preparation on the first-line divisions of the Army began at 0415 hours. Meanwhile, a flotilla of assault boats landed a German force 1,500m behind the anti-tank ditch across the Parpach Narrows to disrupt the second echelon defenses. Overnight the ditch was bridged, and late on the 9th Manstein was able to commit the 22nd Panzer Division which by the middle of the next day reached the Sea of Azov, cutting off the 51st Army as well as the remnants of the 44th. The 398th was caught up in this mayhem and while some of its men were among the approximately 50,000 evacuated from Crimea to the Taman Peninsula, most were killed or captured and the division was officially stricken from the Red Army order of battle just a few days later on May 19.
