= Chikov =

Chikov Чиков
- Khutor
- Location within Volgograd Oblast Location within Russia
- Coordinates: 47°59′N 43°27′E
- Country: Russia
- Region: Volgograd Oblast
- District: Oktyabrsky District
- Time zone: UTC+4:00

Chikov (Russian: Чиков) is a rural locality (a khutor) in Zalivskoye Rural Settlement, Oktyabrsky District, Volgograd Oblast, Russia. The population was 375 as of 2010. There are 6 streets.

== Geography ==
The village is located on the left bank of the Aksay Yesaulovsky River.
