= 404th Rifle Division =

- Active: 1941–1942
- Country: Soviet Union
- Branch: Red Army
- Type: Infantry
- Engagements: World War II: Battle of the Kerch Peninsula

The 404th Rifle Division was an infantry division of the Soviet Union's Red Army during World War II. Formed in late 1941, the division fought in the Battle of the Kerch Peninsula and was destroyed there in May 1942.

== History ==
The division was formed from September to October 1941 on the Transcaucasian Front, in accordance with Stavka Order No. 170426. It was commanded by Colonel Pyotr Motovilov. After completing its formation, the division was deployed in the Caucasus, fighting in combat from 1 December. It was part of the 44th Army. On 26 December, the division landed in Crimea during the Battle of the Kerch peninsula. On 29 March, Colonel Mikhail Menshikov took command of the division. Colonel Dmitry Kuropatenko took command on 26 April. During the German offensive in May 1942, the division was destroyed. It was officially disbanded on 14 June 1942.

== Composition ==
The division included the following units.

- 643rd Rifle Regiment
- 652nd Rifle Regiment
- 655th Rifle Regiment
- 961st Artillery Regiment
- 187th Separate Anti-Tank Battalion
- 189th Anti-Aircraft Artillery Battery (later 685th Separate Anti-Aircraft Artillery Battalion)
- 682nd Mortar Battalion
- 460th Reconnaissance Company
- 679th Sapper Battalion
- 849th Separate Communications Battalion
- 483rd Medical Battalion
- 476th Separate Chemical Defence Company
- 341st Motor Transport Company
- 248th Field Bakery (later 112th Field Bakery)
- 823rd Divisional Veterinary Hospital
- 1457th Field Post Office
- 728th Field Ticket Office of the State Bank
