= 76 mm mountain gun M1938 =

Soviet mountain gun used during WWII

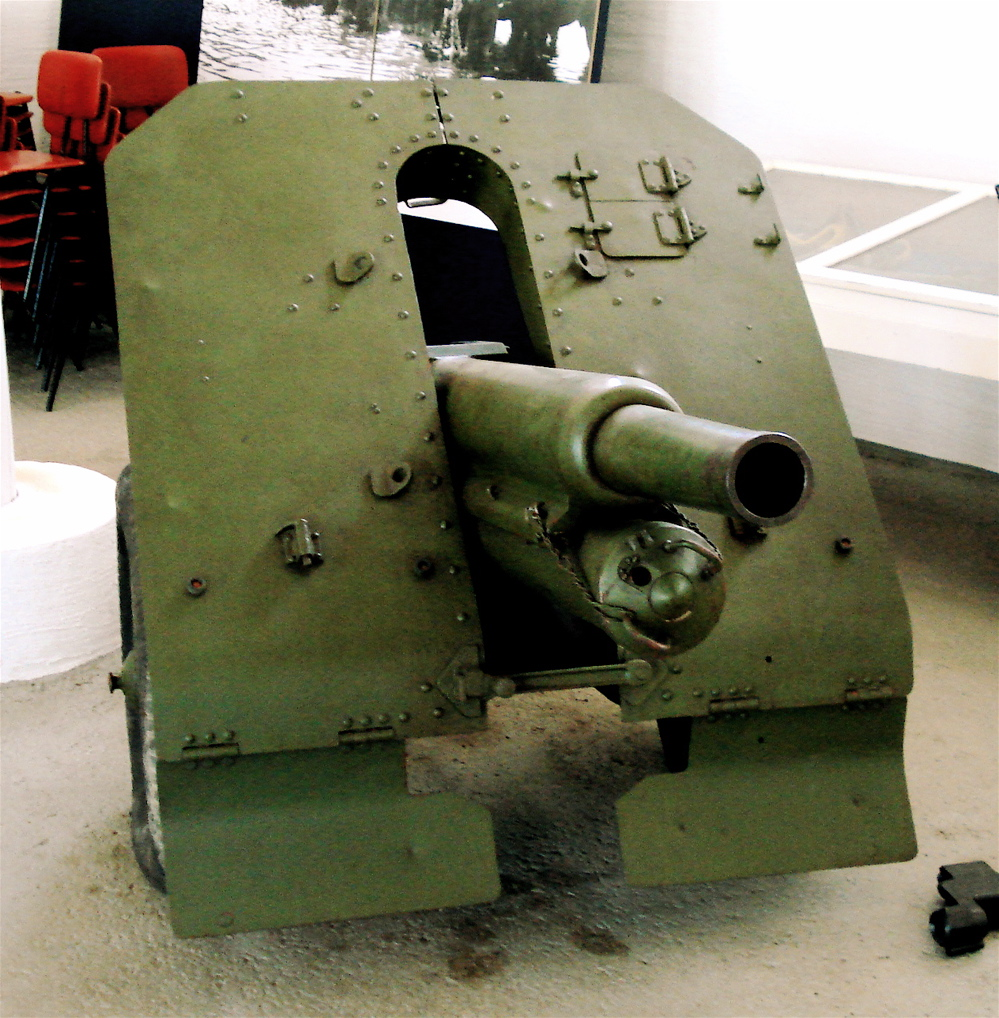
- M1938 in the Artillery Museum of Finland.
- Type: mountain gun
- Place of origin: Czechoslovakia

Service history
- Used by: USSR
- Wars: World War II

Production history
- Designer: Plant no 7
- Designed: 1937–1938
- Manufacturer: Plant no 7
- Produced: 1939
- No. built: 1,068 (1939–1940)

Specifications
- Mass: 785 kg (1,731 lb)
- Length: 4.24 m (13 ft 11 in)
- Barrel length: 1.63 m (5 ft 4 in) L/21.4
- Width: 1.28 m (4 ft 2 in)
- Height: 1.35 m (4 ft 5 in)
- Shell weight: 6.23 kg (13.7 lbs)
- Caliber: 76.2 mm (3 in)
- Breech: Vertical sliding-block
- Carriage: Box trail
- Elevation: -8° to +65°
- Traverse: 10°
- Rate of fire: 10–15 r.p.m.
- Muzzle velocity: 495 m/s (1,624 ft/s)
- Maximum firing range: 10,720 m (6.66 mi)

The 76 mm mountain gun M1938 (Russian: 76-мм горная пушка обр. 1938 г.) was a Soviet gun used in World War II.

In 1937, USSR got a license for Skoda 75 mm M1936 mountain gun in exchange for license production of Tupolev SB in Czechoslovakia; subsequently, in 1937-1938 a team led by L. I. Gorlitskiy at Plant no 7 developed a modification eventually adopted as 76 mm mountain gun M1938.

The gun had high elevation angle and could be quickly dismantled for transporting by pack horses. Sprung wheels allowed high towing speed. The gun was light enough to be moved in combat by its crew.

By 1 June 1941, the Red Army possessed about 1068 pieces. In addition to mountain units, the weapon was issued to some airborne units.

In Wehrmacht service the gun was designated as 7.62 cm GebK 307(r). The Finnish army operated five captured pieces, known as 76 VK 38.

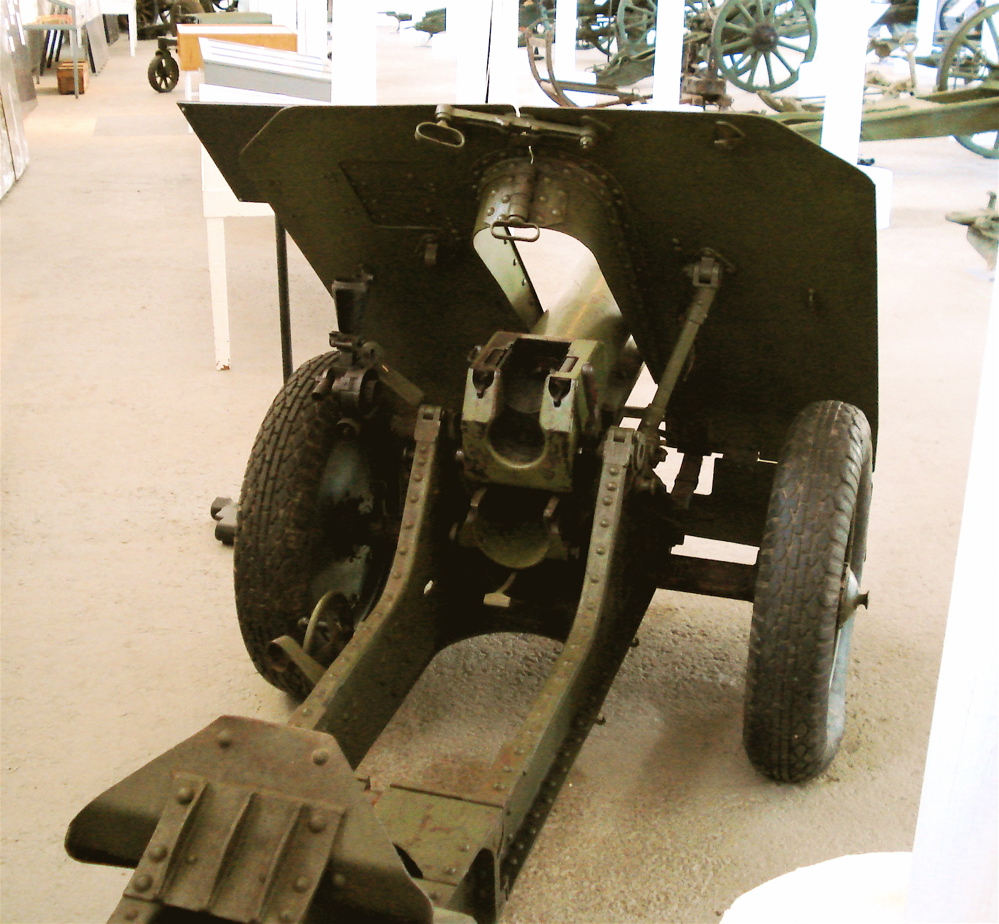
M1938, rear view.

== See also ==
- 76 mm mountain gun M1958 (2A2) — A Soviet Cold War successor that used the same barrel.
