= 276th Rifle Division =

- Active: 1st formation: July 1941 – May 1942; 2nd formation: August 1942 – summer 1945
- Country: Soviet Union
- Branch: Red Army
- Type: Rifle division
- Engagements: World War II
- Decorations: Order of the Red Banner (2nd formation)
- Battle honours: Temryuk (2nd formation)

The 276th Rifle Division (Russian: 276-я стрелковая дивизия) was an infantry division of the Soviet Union's Red Army during World War II, formed twice.

First formed in the summer of 1941, the 276th was destroyed in Crimea during the Battle of the Kerch Peninsula in the spring of 1942. Reformed during the summer in the Caucasus as a Georgian national division, the 276th served through the entire war before being disbanded in the summer of 1945.

== History ==
=== First Formation ===
The 276th began forming on 10 July 1941 near Orel in the Orel Military District. Its basic order of battle included the 871st, 873rd, and the 876th Rifle Regiments, as well as the 852nd Artillery Regiment. Still incomplete, the division was rushed south to Crimea, where it finished forming near Simferopol with the 51st Army. The division fought in the defense of Crimea until November, when it was evacuated to the Caucasus. In February 1942 the division returned to Crimea, fighting in the Battle of the Kerch Peninsula as part of the 44th Army. When Operation Bustard Hunt, the final German offensive, began on 8 May, the division was virtually destroyed. Its division commander and staff escaped by being evacuated to the Caucasus.

=== Second Formation ===
The 276th was reformed at Kutaisi in the Transcaucasian Military District as a Georgian National Division in August. In November, it was sent into combat as part of the 9th Army of the Transcaucasian Front northern group along the Terek River. After the German retreat from the Caucasus, the 276th remained with the 9th Army on the Kuban front. In October 1943, the division was transferred to the Reserve of the Supreme High Command, and at the end of 1943 was assigned to the 18th Army on the front. The 276th was soon transferred to the 1st Guards Army. By the beginning of 1944 the division had removed all of the light 50 mm mortars of its rifle units, which may have been a mistake because the army spent most of 1944 in the Carpathian mountains, and the mortars were portable over rough terrain. By August, the 852nd Artillery Regiment had at least one battery entirely equipped with captured German 105 mm howitzers in place of the normal 122 mm howitzers. During the last weeks of the war, in April 1945, the division transferred to the 38th Army, advancing through western Czechoslovakia. The division was disbanded "in place" during the summer of 1945 with the Northern Group of Forces.
