= 224th Rifle Division =

224th Rifle Division (June 1941 - June 14, 1942) 224th Rifle Division (July 1, 1942 - April 1946)
- Active: 1941–1946
- Country: Soviet Union
- Branch: Red Army
- Type: Infantry
- Size: Division
- Engagements: Crimean campaign Battle of the Kerch Peninsula; Siege of Leningrad; Operation Iskra; Leningrad–Novgorod offensive Krasnoye Selo–Ropsha offensive Continuation War; Battle of Vyborg Bay (1944)
- Decorations: Order of the Red Banner (2nd Formation)
- Battle honours: Gatchina (2nd Formation)

Commanders
- Notable commanders: Lt. Col. Ivan Mikhailovich Lilyavin; Col. Aleksandr Pavlovich Degtyarev; Col. Valerian Sergeevich Dzabakhidze; Col. Stepan Ivanovich Gerasimenko; Col. Fyodor Antonovich Burmistrov

The 224th Rifle Division was an infantry division of the Red Army, originally formed as one of the first reserve rifle divisions following the German invasion of the USSR. A large part of this first formation took part in amphibious landings near Kerch in late December 1941 but it was encircled and destroyed during the Battle of the Kerch Peninsula in May 1942.

A new 224th was raised in July 1942 near Arkhangelsk and served the rest of the war in the fighting near Leningrad and the subsequent campaigns against Finland. Even after joining the 67th Army in the city, it was understrength until it was reinforced by a disbanded rifle brigade. During the Leningrad–Novgorod Offensive, as part of 42nd Army, it took part in the liberation of Gatchina (Krasnogvardeisk) for which it received a battle honor. As the offensive continued, it took part in the partial encirclement and elimination of a German division near Lake Peipus and was recognized for this feat with the Order of the Red Banner. During the summer offensive in 1944 that drove Finland out of the war, the 224th, now in 59th Army, played a leading role in amphibious landings on several islands in Vyborg Bay. Following this, it remained facing Finland as part of 23rd Army until the end of the war. Late in 1945 it was moved to the Ivanovo Oblast and was disbanded in April 1946.

== 1st Formation ==
While technically this could be considered a pre-war division, since it had a commander assigned on June 1, 1941, it does not appear in the official Red Army order of battle until September 1. It appears that it was scheduled to form up in June but nothing was actually done besides assigning Lt. Col. Ivan Mikhailovich Lilyavin, and possibly a basic staff, until July. The formation took place at Sukhumi in the Transcaucasian Military District and as it was recruited locally it was considered a Georgian national division through its existence. Once formed, its official order of battle, based on an abbreviated version of the shtat (table of organization and equipment) of September 13, 1939, was as follows:

- 143rd Rifle Regiment
- 160th Rifle Regiment
- 185th Rifle Regiment
- 111th Artillery Regiment
- 76th Antitank Battalion
- 80th Antiaircraft Battalion
- 96th Reconnaissance Company
- 47th Sapper Battalion
- 172nd Signal Battalion
- 44th Medical/Sanitation Battalion
- 46th Motor Transport Company
- 52nd Field Bakery
- 994th Field Postal Station
- 898th Field Office of the State Bank

Lt. Colonel Lilyavin was replaced on July 10 by Col. Aleksandr Pavlovich Degtyarev, and this probably marks the time when the division began forming in earnest. As of the start of September it was assigned to 46th Army in Transcaucasian Front.

== Crimean Campaign ==
The 224th officially entered the fighting front on November 24, and on December 18 it was reassigned to 51st Army in the Caucasus Front (later Crimean Front). The Front chief of staff, Maj. Gen. F. I. Tolbukhin, came up with an overly elaborate plan to compromise the positions of German 11th Army in the Kerch Peninsula with many small amphibious landings at multiple points rather than one large landing. In the first echelon of the operation five different transport groups would land a total of 7,500 troops from the 224th and the 302nd Mountain Rifle Division on separate beaches north and south of Kerch.

On the evening of December 25 elements of the 224th and the 83rd Naval Infantry Brigade loaded aboard small craft on the Taman Peninsula to cross the near-frozen Kerch Strait. Group Two, heading for Cape Khroni, 7 km (4.3 mi) northeast of Kerch, consisted of the gunboat Don, the transports Krasny Flot and Pyenay, a tugboat, two self-propelled barges that carried three T-26 tanks and some artillery, and 16 small fishing trawlers. Lacking purpose-built landing craft the Azov Flotilla was forced to use whaleboats to transfer troops from the transports to the shore, a tedious and difficult process under the circumstances. The weather was roughly Sea state 5 with strong westerly winds and rain, and worsening. At the landing point 697 soldiers of the 2nd Battalion of 160th Rifle Regiment managed to reach shore by 0630 hours on December 26, but a number of men drowned while wading ashore through the surf or became hypothermia casualties. Later in the day another battalion was landed, along with the tanks and artillery. Only 290 men succeeded in getting ashore at Cape Zyuk farther west, and at Cape Tarhan the effort was abortive due to a lack of whaleboats. A more successful landing took place at Bulganak Bay where 1,452 troops of the 143rd Rifle Regiment landed, along with another three T-26s, two 76mm howitzers and two 45mm antitank guns. Other landings at Kazantip Point and Yeni-Kale failed due to the weather.

By midday the Army had five separate beachheads on the north side of the Kerch Peninsula containing barely 3,000 half-frozen and lightly armed soldiers who generally moved 1–2 km (0.62–1.24 mi) inland before digging in against expected German counterattacks. The 22nd Regiment of the 46th Infantry Division was located in the Kerch area but had very few men along this stretch of coast. However, the German Air Force soon arrived, sinking the cargo ship Voroshilov with 450 soldiers aboard, while a further 100 were lost when a vessel of Group Two was bombed near Cape Zyuk. The isolated regimental and battalion commanders of the 224th, with little or no communications between them or with higher headquarters, decided to wait for the arrival of the rest of the division and the follow-on 83rd Brigade before advancing inland. However, the worsening weather prevented any further large-scale landings for the next three days. The landings by 302nd Mountain Division south of Kerch on December 26 were opposed by the 46th Infantry's 42nd Regiment and largely failed, apart from 2,175 who got ashore at Kamysh Burun.

The commander of the 46th Infantry, Lt. Gen. K. Himer, ordered elements of his reserve 97th Regiment to counterattack the beachhead at Cape Zyuk but due to bad road conditions they were not in position until 1300 hours on December 27. Nevertheless, during the next day they were able to overwhelm the lodgement, which had been reinforced by the 83rd Brigade; 300 Red Army men were killed and 458 were taken prisoner. In the meantime the reinforcing 72nd Infantry Regiment crushed the beachhead at Cape Khroni. Only about 1,000 troops remained hanging on at Bulganak Bay.

A second wave of Soviet landings took place farther west on December 29, and the city of Feodosiya, which had been held by a battalion of the 97th Regiment, was liberated by units of the 44th Army. At 0830 hours the German Corps commander ordered his 46th Division to retreat from the Kerch Peninsula despite having been forbidden to do so by the commander of 11th Army. The division force-marched 125 km (78 mi) through a snowstorm over December 30-31 toward the Corps headquarters northwest of Feodosiya, abandoning vehicles due to fuel shortages and with its heavy equipment lagging behind. It then ran into a roadblock held by the 63rd Mountain Rifle Division and was forced to continue its retreat cross-country, although its personnel losses were light. With the departure of the 46th the 302nd Mountain Division was able to liberate Kerch on the 31st. Both the 51st and 44th Armies were free to establish themselves on the Kerch Peninsula.

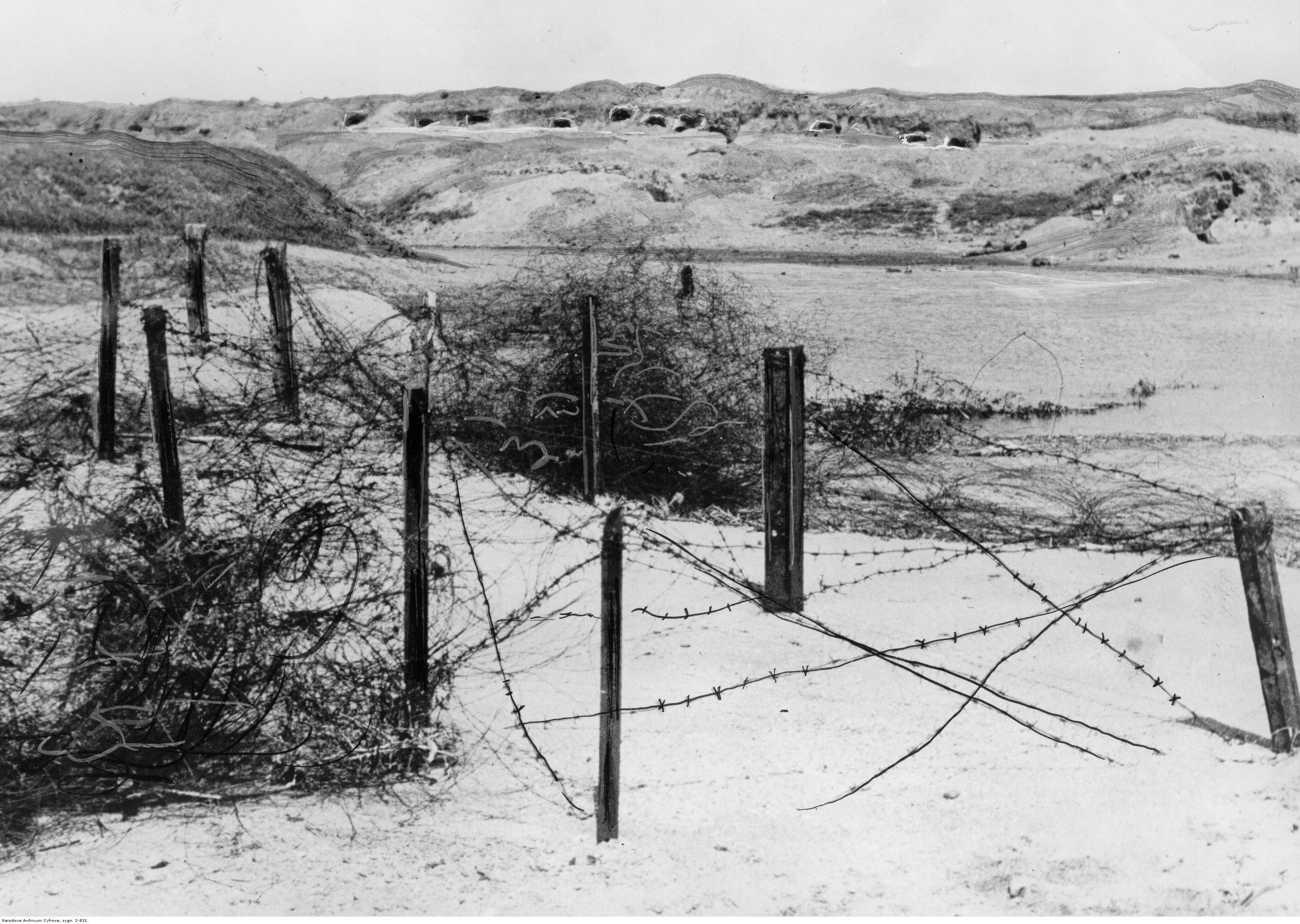
Red Army defenses on the Parpach Isthmus, May 1942

The vanguard of 51st Army arrived at the Parpach Isthmus by January 5, 1942, but by the 12th it still had only two divisions deployed forward. Meanwhile 11th Army was concentrating German and Romanian forces for a counterattack which struck 44th Army on January 15, effectively destroying the 236th Mountain Rifle Division on the first day, mauling much of the rest of the Army and forcing it back to the Parpach. After January 20 the two sides dug in along this 17km-wide line which soon acquired the characteristics of a WWI battlefield with extensive trenches, dugouts and barbed wire. 44th Army was effectively crippled and the addition of 51st Army did not allow Crimean Front to do more than hold its ground. On January 29 Colonel Degtyarev handed his command to Col. Mikhail Ivanovich Menshikov, but this officer was in turn replaced by Col. Valerian Sergeevich Dzabakhidze on February 10. From February 27 to April 11 Crimean Front launched a series of efforts to break out west of Parpach toward Sevastopol but these had little result beyond heavy Soviet casualties. 51st Army on the northern part of the line did most of this fighting with 44th Army offering diversionary support; as one further result the bulk of the Front's forces ended up massed on this northern flank. By the start of May the 224th had been reassigned to 47th Army which had recently moved to Crimean Front.

=== Operation Bustard Hunt ===
Before the last of these offensives ended General von Manstein began planning an operation to destroy all three armies of Crimean Front in one stroke. Operation Trappenjagd would initially target the 44th Army, which was defending a sector about 6 km (3.7 mi) long with five rifle divisions and two tank brigades. 47th Army was deployed on the opposite (northern) end of the Parpach defenses. While the Front had nearly 260,000 men, 347 tanks, and 3,577 guns and mortars deployed in the peninsula, most of these forces were concentrated in preparation for their own attack, leaving them poorly prepared to defend themselves. Trappenjagd began with a massive artillery preparation at 0315 hours on May 8 and the positions of 44th Army were hopelessly compromised within hours. Late the next morning the 22nd Panzer Division penetrated the Parpach line and, despite heavy rains overnight got into the rear of 51st and 47th Armies on May 10. The battle quickly became a disaster for the Red Army; on May 15 a regiment of the German 170th Infantry Division covered more than 80 km (50 mi) to retake Kerch. Over the next two days the surrounded Soviet troops came under heavy artillery and air attacks which reduced them to a formless mob, 170,000 eventually being made prisoners. Colonel Dzabakhidze survived the debacle, going on to command the 406th and 414th Rifle Divisions before the end of the war and being promoted to the rank of major general in November 1943. The 224th was officially disbanded on June 14.

== 2nd Formation ==
A new 224th began forming on July 1, 1942, at Onega in the Arkhangelsk Military District, based on the 116th Rifle Brigade. Given the realities of sparse population and limited resources in the far north the division spent almost six months forming up as compared to other divisions being formed in two to four months elsewhere in the Soviet Union. Once formed its order of battle, based on the shtat of July 28, was as follows:

- 143rd Rifle Regiment
- 160th Rifle Regiment
- 185th Rifle Regiment
- 111th Artillery Regiment
- 76th Antitank Battalion
- 96th Reconnaissance Company
- 47th Sapper Battalion
- 364th Signal Company (until November 5, 1944; thereafter 253rd Signal Battalion)
- 44th Medical/Sanitation Battalion
- 205th Chemical Defense (Anti-gas) Company
- 46th Motor Transport Company
- 52nd Field Bakery
- 100th Divisional Veterinary Hospital
- 1764th Field Postal Station
- 1718th Field Office of the State Bank

Lt. Col. Stepan Ivanovich Gerasimenko, who had been in command of the 116th Brigade since April, remained in command of the division; he would be promoted to the rank of colonel on October 23. The 224th joined the fighting front on December 12 when it entered the reserves of Leningrad Front. It would remain in this Front for the duration of the war.

== Siege of Leningrad ==
The pending defeat of the German 6th Army at Stalingrad led the STAVKA to exploit the victory by breaking the siege of Leningrad. Operation Iskra (Spark) was in planning from late November with the objective of forcing a corridor across the Shlisselburg–Sinyavino bottleneck east of the city by linking up the 67th Army from the west with the 2nd Shock Army from the east. The 224th was part of a group of reinforcements, including five rifle brigades, that was shipped across Lake Ladoga to join the 67th. The offensive began early on January 12, 1943, with a massive two-and-a-half hour artillery preparation against the positions held by elements of German 18th Army's XXVI Army Corps across the Neva. During the first two days the Army made some gains but failed to make a breakthrough and the Army commander, Maj. Gen. M. P. Dukhanov, was ordered to commit his second echelon on January 14, but this may have actually slowed progress. The Soviet armies eventually linked up south of Lake Ladoga on January 18, restoring land communications to Leningrad.

== Leningrad–Novgorod Offensive ==
In February the division was moved to 23rd Army north of the city and then in March to 55th Army on its southern approaches. Even now, before seeing any serious combat, it was not up to strength and in May it was reinforced with troops from the 56th Naval Rifle Brigade, which had been disbanded within 55th Army. During July and August it was slated to take a supporting role in the Fifth Sinyavino Offensive but this was cancelled when 67th Army's attacks were unsuccessful.

The division was pulled back to the Leningrad Front reserves in December where it was assigned to the 108th Rifle Corps, but when it returned to the front prior to the winter offensive it was assigned to the 42nd Army's 116th Rifle Corps, which also contained the 291st Rifle Division. Colonel Gerasimenko was sent to study at the Voroshilov Academy on December 17 and would later command the 79th Guards Rifle Division. He was replaced by Col. Fyodor Antonovich Burmistrov, who would lead the division into the postwar.

=== Krasnoe Selo-Ropsha Offensive ===
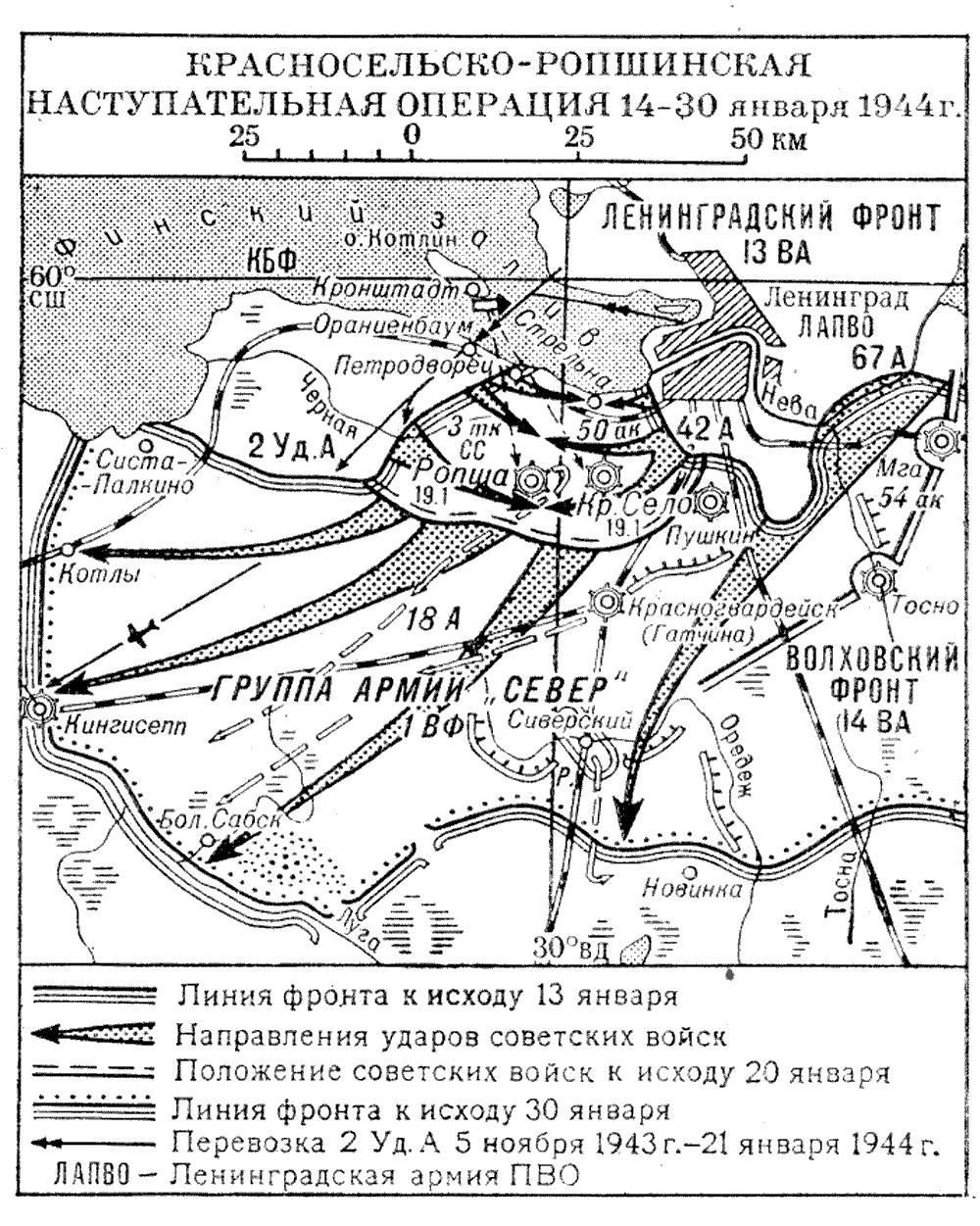
Krasnoe Selo-Ropsha Offensive. Note initial positions of 42nd Army.

The offensive that finally ended the siege of Leningrad began on January 14, 1944. The strongest German defenses faced 42nd Army and the Volkhov Front's 59th Army, where the main defensive belt was 4–6 km (2.5–3.7 mi) deep, backed by a second belt 8–12 km (5.0–7.5 mi) to the rear. The plan called for the 116th Corps to serve as the Army's reserve in the initial stage.

The assault began with air attacks overnight followed by a massive 65-minute artillery preparation and by the day's end the 2nd Shock Army's first echelon had gained as much as 3 km (1.9 mi) on a 10-kilometer-wide (6.2-mile) sector with 42nd Army's artillery providing support. That Army began its assault at 1100 hours on January 15 following a similar bombardment but its leading troops faced heavier resistance from three divisions of L Army Corps and it soon degenerated into a slugfest with 30th Guards Rifle Corps managing to penetrate no farther than 4km; a similar gain was made the next day. By January 17 the two Soviet armies were converging and the German positions north of Krasnoye Selo were threatened with encirclement. 116th Corps was committed the next day while 30th Guards Corps captured Krasnoye Selo and cut the road to Gatchina. Overnight on January 19/20 mobile units of 2nd Shock and 42nd Armies linked up in the Ropsha region as demoralized German troops filtered through their lines. On January 22 the Army commander, Col. Gen. I. I. Maslennikov, ordered his main shock group to assault German defenses around Gatchina at 1300 hours after a 15-minute artillery raid. This was led by the 123rd and 117th Rifle Corps, while 110th Rifle Corps advanced on Pushkin and Slutsk from the west and while the latter made progress the main attack hung up on powerful defenses. The effort was renewed on January 25 and finally the next day at 1000 hours the 224th, in cooperation with the 120th Rifle Division, cleared the town. In recognition it received a battle honor:

GATCHINA (KRASNOGVARDEISK) - ...224th Rifle Division (Col. Burmistrov, Fyodor Antonovich)... By order of the Supreme High Command of 26 January 1944 and a commendation in Moscow, the troops who participated in the battles for the liberation of Krasnogvardeisk are given a salute of 12 artillery salvoes from 124 guns.

42nd Army continued its advance over the next few days against dwindling resistance and captured the important German supply base at Volosovo. Its spearheads reached the Luga River on January 30 and captured several bridgeheads. By this time German 18th Army's left flank and center were in full retreat.

On February 7 the Army fought a meeting engagement with elements of Army Group North attempting to take up positions for a counterattack southwest of Luga and east of Lake Peipus. The Army advanced to the south in a single echelon from west of the Plyussa River to the east bank of the lake. 116th and 123rd Corps regrouped during February 6-8 and prepared to assault southeastward toward the Luga–Pskov railroad but their advance the next day ran into the German counterattack force, most of which had not yet reached its designated positions. The 58th Infantry Division encountered the 224th and 86th Rifle Divisions at the junction of the two Corps. The two rifle divisions attacked immediately and overwhelmed the 58th before it could take up a defense, while also turning the left flank of the 13th Luftwaffe Field Division and forced its troops to occupy a hasty defense south of the Plyussa. L Corps' 21st and 24th Infantry Divisions were supposed to protect the flanks of the 58th but were late arriving, leaving the division to fend for itself against superior forces. By the time the 21st and 24th arrived the 224th and 86th had been reinforced with the remainder of 116th Corps.

The situation of the 58th Infantry worsened on February 10 when the 291st Rifle Division joined the attack and helped collapse the defenses of all three German divisions in the Zarudine, Berezitsa and Orekhovno sectors. The 58th's 154th Infantry Regiment was left encircled and over the next several days the 224th, 86th and 291st Divisions strove to destroy it while also advancing south- and southwestward. The 24th Infantry tried to close the gap on the right of the 58th but got nowhere. The new commander of Army Group North, Field Marshal W. Model, ordered the 13th Luftwaffe and 12th Panzer Divisions to go to the rescue of the 58th, whose 220th Infantry Regiment was now also encircled in the Zovka region. The effort was defeated when the 168th Rifle Division attacked into the gap between 12th Panzer and the 58th and the 224th intercepted and defeated the 13th Luftwaffe's relief force. During February 11-12 the division, along with the 86th and 291st, completed destroying the two encircled regiments, as well as the 5th Panzergrenadier Regiment of 12th Panzer in the Zarudine region. According to a Soviet account:

On 13 February subunits of the 58th Infantry Division's 220th Infantry Regiment and the 12th Panzer Division's 5th Motorized Regiment attempted to penetrate from the region northwest of Lake Chernoe toward Strugi Krasnye. The attempt ended unsuccessfully. Throwing away its combat weaponry and supplies, the enemy began crossing Lake Chernoe on the ice on the night of 15 February.

Given this, and other, defeats the commander of 18th Army informed Model the only way to close the gaps on his left flank was to take the entire front back to the shortest line from the south end of Lake Peipus to Lake Ilmen, which Model reluctantly agreed to. In recognition for its part in this victory the division would be awarded the Order of the Red Banner on March 22.

== Continuation War ==
Later in February the 224th, along with the rest of 116th Corps, was moved to 67th Army, but in March it was shifted to 98th Rifle Corps in the same Army, before going into the Front reserves in April. In May it was assigned to the 43rd Rifle Corps in 2nd Shock Army, but by the beginning of July it was serving as the only rifle division in 59th Army. 43rd Corps was soon subordinated to this Army and the 224th rejoined it, along with the 124th and 80th Rifle Divisions.

=== Battle of Vyborg Bay ===
What the STAVKA intended to be the final offensive against Finland had begun on June 10 and ten days later the combined 21st and 23rd Armies of Leningrad Front occupied the city of Vyborg (Viipuri). The Baltic Fleet had been assigned to support the former in its advance on the west side of the Karelian Isthmus. Part of this support consisted of conducting genuine and feint amphibious assaults to tie down Finnish forces, using elements of 43rd Corps. The 224th was selected to carry out real landings in the Ino, Seiviaste and Koivisto sectors any time after June 3. The Red Army had gained considerable experience in small-scale amphibious operations since 1942 and for this purpose two of the division's regiments were organized as follows:

- 143rd Rifle Regiment: 1,200 men, eight artillery pieces, six mortars, four T-26 tanks;
- 160th Rifle Regiment: 1,200 men, three artillery pieces, six mortars.

Following the occupation of Vyborg the 21st and 23rd Armies expected to smash through the Finnish defenses to the north and northeast and advance to the prewar Soviet-Finnish border and the seaborne attack was intended to assist this by capturing the islands in Vyborg Bay before landing on the Finnish mainland on the Bay's north shore to outflank the Finnish lines.

The Finns had already erected defenses along the north coast of the Bay in expectation of an assault and these were manned by the 2nd Coastal Brigade and elements of V Army Corps. The islands were held by the reinforced 1st Cavalry Brigade. In addition to other Finnish forces on the mainland the German 122nd Infantry Division was in reserve in the Siakkiiarvi region. According to Soviet intelligence the 1st Cavalry and 2nd Coastal Brigades had 31 artillery and mortar batteries with 130 guns and mortars of 75mm-210mm calibre. On the other hand, the 224th was immediately backed by a gun artillery brigade and an antiaircraft regiment. It had further support from a mortar brigade, one howitzer and one antitank brigade, a naval railroad artillery brigade, a Guards-mortar regiment, and other ground and air assets. The naval force consisted of 84 cutters and 30 amphibious tenders plus a division of torpedo boats.

The assault was set to start at first light on July 4. Colonel Burmistrov's three rifle regiments were to land simultaneously on Teikar-saari, Suonion-saari and Ravan-saari after embarking at Khannukkola and Iokhannes late on July 3. Coastal and ship's guns and aircraft would support the passage and smokescreens would conceal the landings. The 143rd and 160th Regiments formed the first echelon while the 185th was in the second. Beginning at 0845 hours a five-minute artillery raid, followed by 65 minutes of methodical fire, then another five-minute raid, was conducted by the 250 guns, mortars and launchers of 59th Army, and a total of 142 Pe-2 and Il-2 aircraft bombed the islands for up to 40 minutes. The 160th Regiment started landing on Teikar-saari at 1006 hours, while the 185th forced the Tranzund Straits and had Ravan-saari and its village under control by midday.

The 143rd Rifle Regiment faced a more difficult battle on Suonion-saari. One of the first men ashore was Sen. Sgt. Afrikan Ivanovich Votinov, a pre-war member of the Marine Border Troops based in Kamchatka. As second-in-command of his platoon he helped guide its landing without losses, and when his commander was seriously wounded later in the day he took over the lead. This was soon followed by a Finnish counterattack which was repulsed with the loss of up to 20 officers and men, of which Votinov accounted for nine in hand-to-hand combat. The Finnish forces withdrew to Essi-saari and the 143rd crossed again to this island, but the first company to land came under heavy fire and went to ground. Votinov led his platoon in a flanking move which reached the outskirts of the island's village. His men suppressed the Finnish fire positions with hand grenades, which allowed the company to rise up and capture the settlement. On March 24, 1945, Sergeant Votinov was made a Hero of the Soviet Union. After the war he went back to service in the Border Troops in the far east before being retired in 1956. He then worked as a technician in radio and television broadcasting at Tomsk before he died in March 1967.

The 160th also faced difficulties at Teikar-saari. It completed its landing successfully by 1100 hours but afterward recorded only mixed results. It soon lost communications with the coast when a naval mine blew up the ship carrying the commander's radio. When the Regiment encountered heavy resistance it lacked the means to call for artillery or air support. Despite this it was able to secure the southern and central part of the island before Finnish reinforcements began arriving at 1645. Despite losing several small vessels the Finns managed to land a reinforced infantry battalion between 1900 and 2400 hours and by the latter time the 160th had been driven to the island's southern end. At this point the Regiment abandoned the island apart from 200 men dug in on its southern tip. The Army commander, Lt. Gen. I. T. Korovnikov, now ordered this toe-hold reinforced with two battalions and four tanks of the 124th Division, which arrived successfully by 1100 on July 5. With communications restored support from the coast was again available and the Finnish force retreated northward, abandoning Teikar-saari at 2100 hours.

By the end of the same day the 224th was fighting for Turkin-saari and Musta-saari as the remainder of the 124th cleared further islands in the bay, prompting the Finnish command to shore up its coastal defenses southwest of Vyborg. Meanwhile, the Leningrad Front commander, Marshal L. A. Govorov, ordered the Baltic Fleet to prepare another amphibious assault along this coast on July 12 with the three divisions of 43rd Corps. This was cancelled when his renewed offensive on the mainland failed and on July 14 the 59th Army was ordered to go over to the defense.

== Postwar ==
The division did not see any significant combat for the duration of the war. In September it left 43rd Corps and entered the reserves of 59th Army before being reassigned to 23rd Army in October where it joined the 115th Rifle Corps. During the next month it was reassigned again, now to 6th Rifle Corps. During 1945, until the surrender of Germany, the division was in 97th Rifle Corps of 23rd Army, standing watch over the border with Finland. Its final full title was the 224th Rifle, Gatchina, Order of the Red Banner Division. (Russian: 224-я стрелковая Гатчинская Краснознамённая дивизия.) At the end of the year it was redeployed with its Corps to the Ivanovo Oblast where it formed the garrison of Shuya. The division was disbanded there in April 1946.
