= Dmitry Timofeyevich Kozlov =

Soviet general

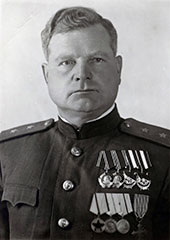
- Kozlov as commander of the Crimean Front
- Born: October 22, 1896; Razgulyayka, now in Nizhny Novgorod Oblast
- Died: December 6, 1967 (aged 71); Minsk, Belarusian SSR, USSR
- Military career
- Allegiance: Russian Empire; Russian SFSR; Soviet Union
- Branch: Infantry
- Service years: 1915–1954
- Rank: Lieutenant general
- Commands: 44th Rifle Division; Transcaucasian Military District; Transcaucasian Front; Caucasian Front; Crimean Front; 24th Army
- Conflicts: World War I; Russian Civil War; World War II; Winter War; Crimean campaign; Battle of the Kerch Peninsula
- Awards: Order of Lenin (3 times), Order of the Red Banner (5 times)

Dmitry Timofeyevich Kozlov (Russian: Дми́трий Тимофе́евич Козло́в; October 23, 1896– December 6, 1967) was a Soviet military commander.

== Life ==
=== 1914–1941 ===
Born in the village of Razgulyayka, he left school in 1915 and joined the Russian Army at the rank of Praporshchik. He served in the First World War and graduated from officer training school in 1917. He moved to the Red Army in 1918, commanding a battalion and then a regiment in the Russian Civil War.

In December 1922 he became the commander of the 4th Turkestan Regiment, then of the 109th Regiment in September 1924. He moved to the staff in 1928, then to head the Kiev Infantry School in 1930. He then became the commander and commissar of 44th Rifle Division in January 1931. Next, he became a general tactical lecturer at the RKKA Military Academy in December 1935, deputy commander of the troops in Odessa Military District in April 1940, and head of the Main Directorate of Red Army Air Defence in December 1940. 1940 also saw him promoted to lieutenant general. He also fought in the Russo-Finnish War.

=== 1941–1967 ===
In January 1941 he was appointed commander of the troops of Transcaucasian Military District and when the Germans invaded in August of that year he was put in command of the Transcaucasian Front, where he led the Soviet contingent in the Anglo-Soviet invasion of Iran.

He moved to command the Caucasian Front in December 1941 and the Crimean Front in January 1942. He commanded the Kerch Peninsula landings but, despite initial successes, the operation ended in disaster, with the Soviets losing over 176,000 men, 37 tanks, around 3,500 guns and mortars and 400 aircraft and losing the bridgehead to the Germans in Operation Trappenjagd. On June 4, 1942, he was demoted to major general and removed from command of the front. In August of that year he was transferred to command 24th Army and from October 1942 was assistant deputy commander of the Voronezh Front.

Kozlov headed Kharkiv's defence and was one of the last Russians to leave it before the Germans recaptured it on March 14, 1943. From March 14 to 21, 1943 Soviet divisions were constantly withdrawing through the woods northeast of Mokhnachev, and Kozlov took the same route away from Kharkiv. From May to August 1943 he was given a post on the Leningrad Front and from August 1943 was made deputy commander of the Transbaikal Front, where he took part in the Soviet offensives against Japan. From 1946 until his retirement in 1954, he was made deputy commander of Transbaikal. He died in 1967 in Minsk.

== Sources ==
- (in Russian) KA Zaleski, Империя Сталина. Биографический энциклопедический словарь. (Stalin's empire. Biographical Encyclopaedia.) Moscow, Veche, 2000.
