= Crimean campaign =

Axis invasion of Crimea during World War II

- Part of Operation Barbarossa
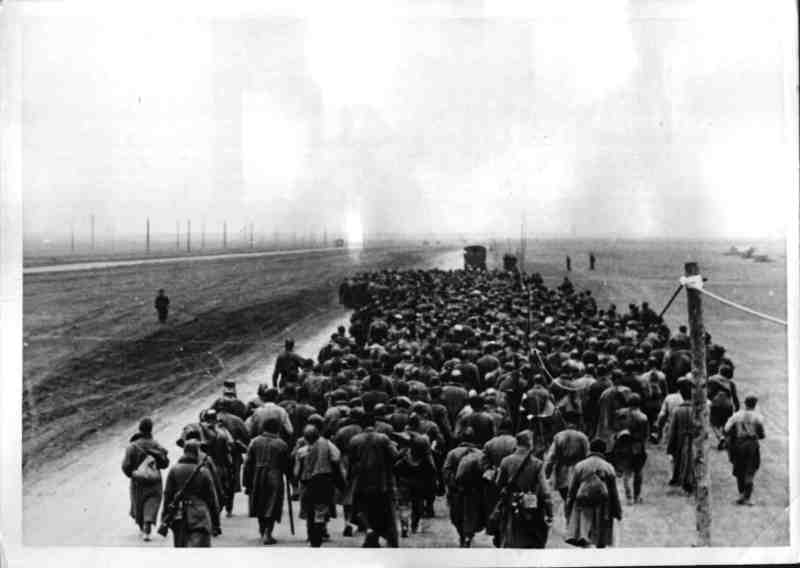
- Soviet POWs in Axis-occupied Crimea, 6 November 1941
Date	18 October 1941 – 4 July 1942 (8 months, 2 weeks and 2 days)
Location	Crimean ASSR, Russian SFSR, Soviet Union
Result	Axis victory
Territorial changes	Beginning of the German occupation of Crimea: Absorption into Reichskommissariat Ukraine

Belligerents
Germany; Romania; Supported by: Italy	Soviet Union

Commanders and leaders
Erich von Manstein; Erick-Oskar Hansen; Maximilian Fretter-Pico; Hans Graf von Sponeck; Florea Mitrănescu; Gheorghe Avramescu; Wolfram von Richthofen	Gordey Levchenko; Ivan Petrov; Filipp Oktyabrsky; Pyotr Novikov (POW); Dmitry Kozlov; Lev Mekhlis; Alexey Pervushin (WIA); Konstantin Kolganov; Vladimir Lvov †; Sergey Gorshkov

Units involved
11th Army: LIV Corps; XXX Corps; XXXXII Corps; 7th Corps; Mountain Corps; VIII Air Corps	Crimean Front: 44th Army; 47th Army; 51st Army; Crimean Front VVS; Sevastopol Defence Region: Coastal Army; Black Sea Fleet: Azov Flotilla

Casualties and losses
30,000 killed, wounded, or missing	65,000 captured 212 vehicles destroyed 672 guns destroyed

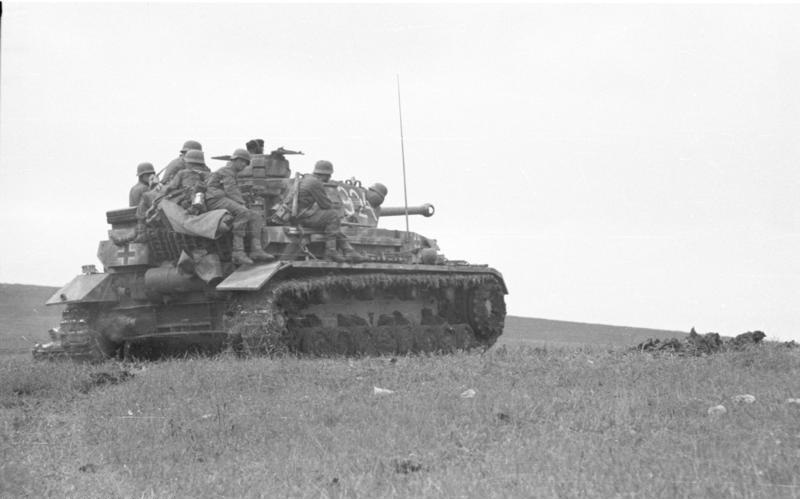
German Panzer IV tank and soldiers in the Crimea, 1942.

The Crimean campaign was conducted by the Axis as part of Operation Barbarossa during World War II. The invading force was led by Germany with support from Romania and Italy, while the Soviet Union took up defensive positions throughout the Crimean Peninsula. The Axis offensive routed the Red Army and enabled the three-year-long German occupation of Crimea.

Beginning on 26 September 1941, the German 11th Army and the Romanian Third Army and Fourth Army were involved in the fighting. They were opposed by the Soviet 51st Army and elements of the Black Sea Fleet. After the campaign, Crimea was occupied by Germany's Army Group A, with the 17th Army as a major subordinate formation.

Sevastopol and Kerch were the only Crimean cities that were not occupied by Axis forces during this campaign; the former was honoured by the Soviet government as a Hero City for resisting against the German and Romanian armies, and the latter was briefly recaptured by the Soviets during an amphibious operation near the end of 1941 before being taken again by the Germans during Operation Bustard Hunt on 8 May. The Siege of Sevastopol lasted 250 days, from 30 October 1941 to 4 July 1942, when the Axis finally captured the city.

In the early hours of 6 November, the Romanian submarine Delfinul, commanded by Constantin Costăchescu, torpedoed and sank the Soviet 1,975-ton cargo ship Uralets 6.4 kilometres (4 mi) to the south of Yalta. The submarine was subsequently attacked by Soviet forces, but she followed a route along the Turkish coast and managed to evade up to 80 depth charges before safely arriving at Constanța on 7 November.

Sevastopol, the main object of the campaign, was surrounded by German forces and assaulted on 30 October 1941. However, the Germans were repulsed by a Soviet counterattack. Later, many troops who had been evacuated from the city of Odessa contributed to defending Sevastopol. The Germans then began an encirclement of the city. Other attacks on 11 November and 30 November, in the eastern and southern sections of the city, failed. German forces were then reinforced by several artillery regiments, one of which included the railway gun Schwerer Gustav. Another attack on 17 December was repulsed at the last moment with the help of reinforcements, and Soviet troops landed on the Kerch Peninsula one day after Christmas to relieve Sevastopol. They remained in the area until being subject to a German counterattack on 9 April and being eliminated by 18 May. With the distraction removed, German forces renewed their assault on Sevastopol, penetrating the inner defensive lines on 29 June. Soviet commanders had been flown out or evacuated by submarine towards the end of the siege and the city surrendered on 4 July 1942, although some Soviet troops held out in caves outside of the city until 9 July.

In 1944, Crimea was recaptured by the 4th Ukrainian Front during the Crimean offensive (8 April 1944 – 12 May 1944), which consisted of three sub-operations:

- Kerch–Eltigen Operation (31 October 1943 – 11 December 1943)
- Perekop–Sevastopol Offensive Operation (8 April 1944 – 12 May 1944)
- Kerch–Sevastopol Offensive Operation (11 April 1944 – 12 May 1944)

== Bibliography ==
- Bishop, Chris, The Military Atlas of World War II, Igloo Books, London, 2005 ISBN 1-904687-53-9
- http://www.soldat.ru/spravka/freedom/1-ssr-3.html Dudarenko, M.L., Perechnev, Yu.G., Yeliseev, V.T., et.el., Reference guide "Liberation of cities": reference for liberation of cities during the period of the Great Patriotic War 1941–1945, Moscow, 1985 (Дударенко, М.Л., Перечнев, Ю.Г., Елисеев, В.Т. и др., сост. Справочник «Освобождение городов: Справочник по освобождению городов в период Великой Отечественной войны 1941–1945»)
- Keegan, John, The Times Atlas of the Second World War, Crescent Books, New York
