= Battle of the Kerch Peninsula =

1942 battle in the Crimea

Coordinates: 45°15′N 35°59′E

- Part of the Crimean campaign during the Eastern Front of World War II
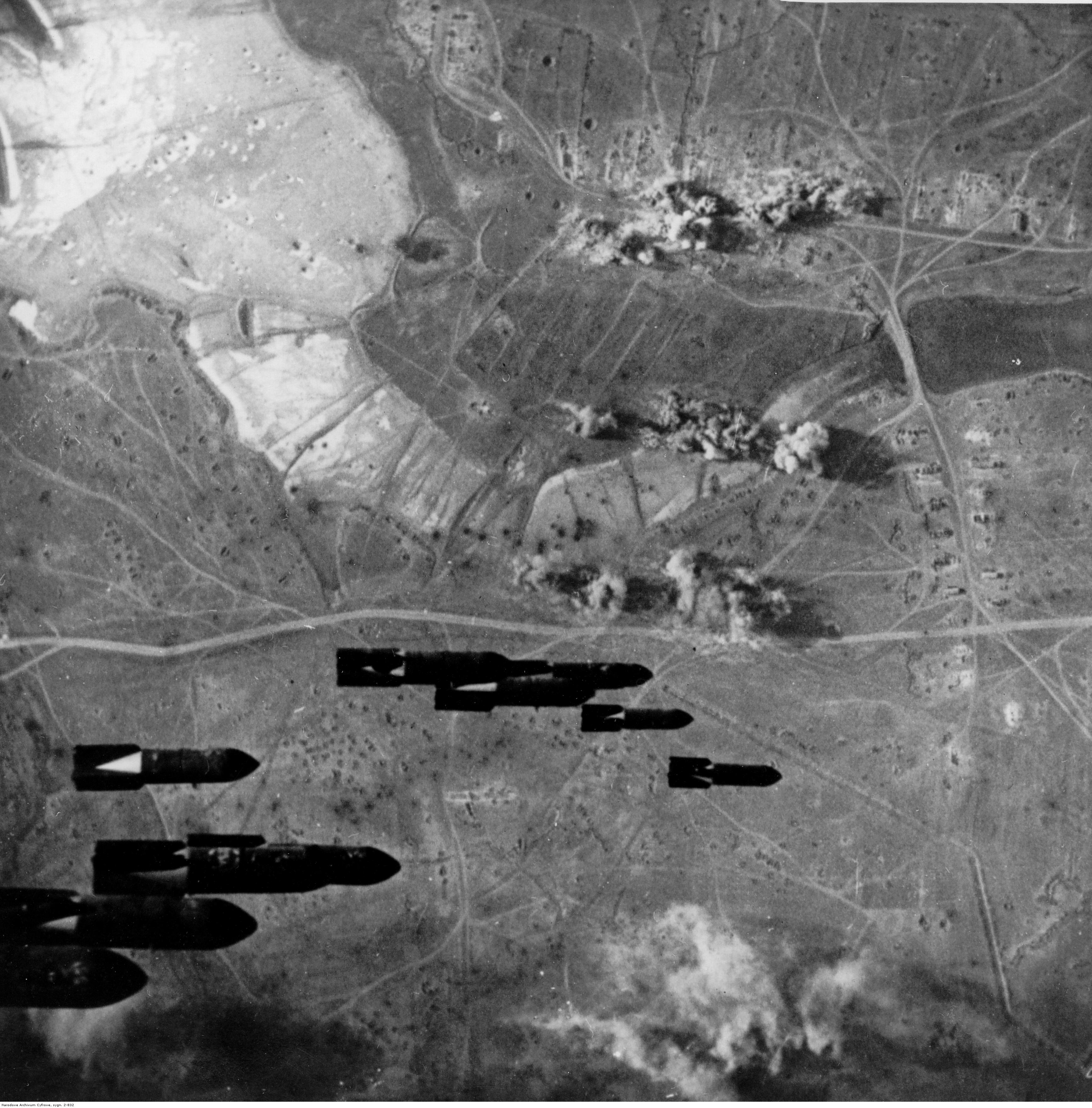
- German bombs fall on the Kerch Peninsula, May 1942
Date	26 December 1941 – 19 May 1942 (4 months, 3 weeks and 2 days)
Location	Crimea, Russian SFSR, Soviet Union
Result	Axis victory

Belligerents
Germany; Romania	Soviet Union

Commanders and leaders
(Nazi Germany) Erich von Manstein (Nazi Germany) W. F. von Richthofen	(Soviet Union) Dimitri Kozlov (Soviet Union) Lev Mekhlis (Soviet Union) Simon Zakyan † (Soviet Union) Filipp Oktyabrsky

Units involved
(Nazi Germany) 11th Army (Nazi Germany) 8th Air Corps	(Soviet Union) Caucasus Front (Note: The front started as the Transcaucasian Front, which became the Caucasus Front on 30 December 1941, and which the independent Crimean Front split from on 28 January 1942) (Soviet Union) Crimean Front: 44th Army; 47th Army; 51st Army; 390th Rifle Division; (Soviet Union) Separate Coastal Army (Soviet Union) Air Force of the Crimean Front (Soviet Union) Black Sea Fleet

Strength
8 May 1942: (Nazi Germany); XXX. Armeekorps – 75,000 men 46th Infantry Division – 13,500 men Total: fewer than 90,000 men 200 tanks 57 assault guns 800+ aircraft (Kingdom of Romania) unknown men	8 May 1942: 249,800 men or 296,000 men 238 tanks 404 aircraft (Air Force of the Crimean Front)

Casualties and losses
38,362 Breakdown: Kerch losses: 21 December – 31 December: 6,654 men 1,108 killed 5,287 wounded 259 missing January 1942 – April 1942: 24,120 men 8 May 1942 – 19 May 1942: 7,588 men 1,703 killed or captured 5,885 wounded 8–12 tanks destroyed 3 assault guns destroyed 9 artillery pieces destroyed 37 aircraft destroyed	570,601 Breakdown: Kerch losses: 26 December – 2 January: 41,935 men 32,453 killed or captured 9,482 wounded or sick 1 January 1942 – 30 April 1942: 352,000 men (Note: 115,630 in January, 98,523 in February, 74,125 in March and 63,722 in April.) 8 May 1942 – 19 May 1942: 176,566 men 162,282 killed or captured 14,284 wounded or sick 258 tanks destroyed 1,133 guns lost 417 aircraft destroyed (315 from Air Force of the Crimean Front)

The Battle of the Kerch Peninsula, which commenced with the Soviet Kerch-Feodosia Landing Operation (Russian: Керченско-Феодосийская десантная операция, romanized: Kerchensko-Feodosiyskaya desantnaya operatsiya) and ended with the German Operation Bustard Hunt (German: Unternehmen Trappenjagd), was a World War II battle between Erich von Manstein's German and Romanian 11th Army and the Soviet Crimean Front forces in the Kerch Peninsula, in the eastern part of the Crimean Peninsula. It began on 26 December 1941, with an amphibious landing operation by two Soviet armies intended to break the Siege of Sevastopol. Axis forces first contained the Soviet beachhead throughout the winter and interdicted its naval supply lines through aerial bombing. From January through April, the Crimean Front launched repeated offensives against the 11th Army, all of which failed with heavy losses. The Red Army lost 352,000 men in the attacks, while the Axis suffered 24,120 casualties. Superior German artillery firepower was largely responsible for the Soviet debacle.

On 8 May 1942, the Axis attacked in a major counteroffensive codenamed Trappenjagd which concluded by around 19 May 1942 with the defeat of the Soviet defending forces. Manstein used a large concentration of airpower, heavily armed infantry divisions, concentrated artillery bombardments and amphibious assaults to break through the Soviet front in its southern portion in 210 minutes, swing north with the 22nd Panzer Division to encircle the Soviet 51st Army on 10 May and annihilate it on 11 May. The remnants of the 44th and 47th armies were pursued to Kerch, where the last pockets of organized Soviet resistance were defeated by 19 May. The decisive element in the German victory was the campaign of airstrikes against the Crimean Front by Wolfram von Richthofen's 800 aircraft VIII. Fliegerkorps, which flew an average of 1,500 sorties per day in support of Trappenjagd and constantly attacked Soviet field positions, armored units, troop columns, medical evacuation ships, airfields, and supply lines. German bombers used up to 6,000 canisters of SD-2 anti-personnel cluster munitions to kill masses of fleeing Soviet infantrymen.

Manstein's outnumbered 11th Army suffered 7,588 casualties, while the Crimean Front lost 176,566 men, 258 tanks, 1,133 artillery pieces and 315 aircraft in three armies comprising twenty-one divisions. Total Soviet casualties during the five-month-long battle amounted to 570,000 men, while Axis losses were 38,000. Trappenjagd was one of the battles immediately preceding the German summer offensive (Case Blue). Its successful conclusion allowed the Axis to concentrate their forces on Sevastopol, which was conquered within six weeks. The Kerch Peninsula was used as a launching pad by German forces to cross the Kerch Strait on 2 September 1942 during Operation Blücher II, a part of the German drive to capture the Caucasus oilfields.

== Prelude ==
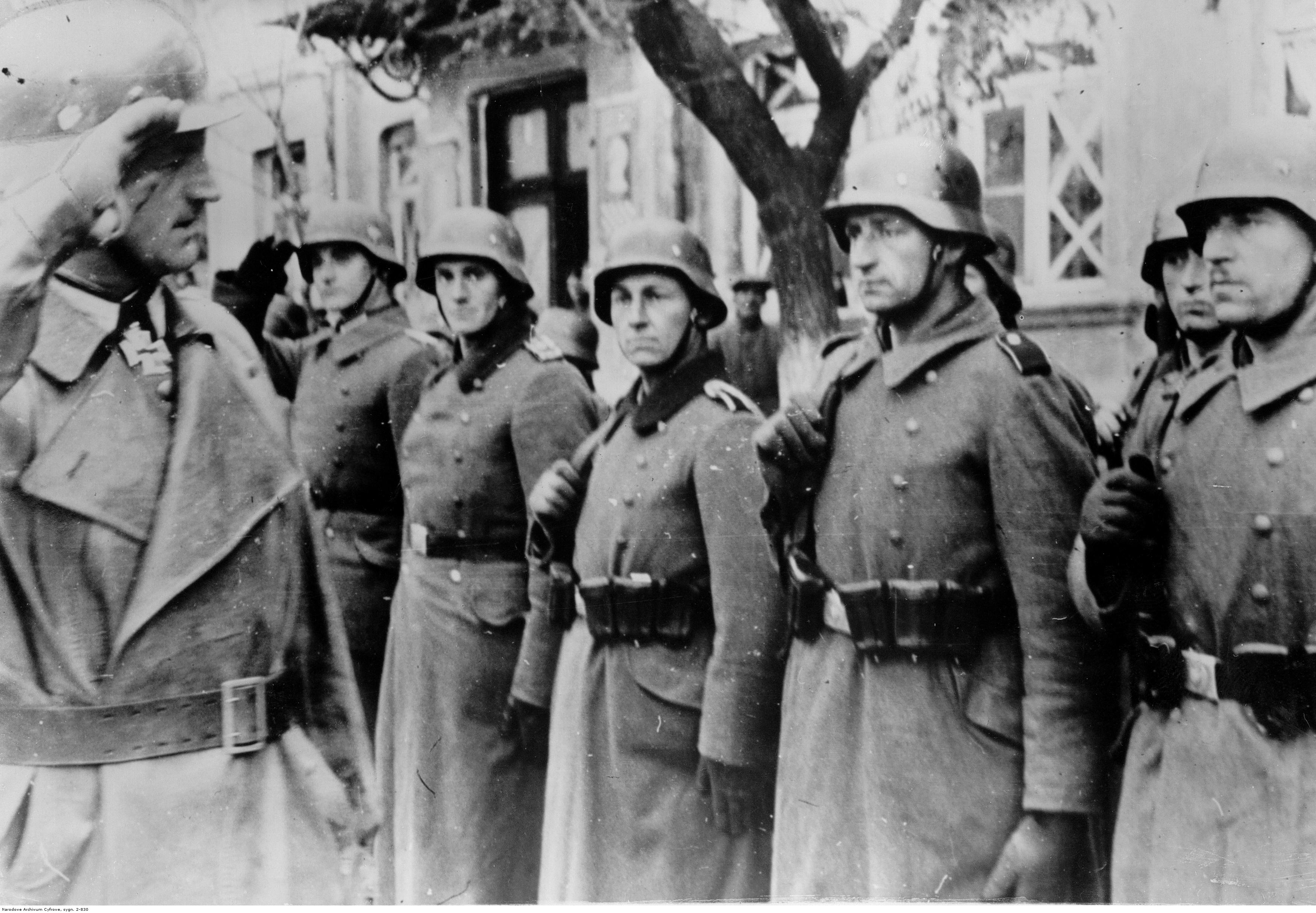
German soldiers in Kerch, November 1941

On 8 December 1941, Stavka, the Soviet supreme command, ordered General-Lieutenant Dmitry Kozlov's Transcaucasian Front to begin planning for a major operation to cross the Kerch Strait and link up with the Soviet Separate Coastal Army holed up in Sevastopol, thereby liberating Crimea from the Germans. The ambitious operation, the first major amphibious operation in Soviet history, was founded upon Soviet dictator Joseph Stalin's belief in the German Wehrmacht's imminent collapse. The plan was drawn up by the Transcaucasian Front's chief of staff General-Major Fyodor Tolbukhin.

Tolbukhin's plan was too complicated for the Red Army's and Soviet Navy's abilities. It was based on multiple small landings at separate locations at separate times instead of one large, simultaneous landing. Five transport groups from Rear-Admiral Sergey Gorshkov's Azov Flotilla would land 7,500 soldiers from the 224th Rifle Division and 302nd Mountain Rifle Division of the 51st Army on eight isolated beaches north and south of Kerch. After the Germans were distracted by this, the 44th Army would land at Feodosiya in the German rear. Naval gunfire support would be provided by the Black Sea Fleet. The Soviet Air Forces, would contribute air cover from the Taman Peninsula. The Soviets had the men and troop transports on hand but were compelled to use fishing trawlers for the actual landings due to the lack of landing craft, had little experience with large-scale joint operations and were impeded by the stormy winter weather.

A German Messerschmitt Bf 110 reconnaissance aircraft noted the buildup of Soviet naval forces and reported it to Lieutenant General Hans Graf von Sponeck's XXXXII Army Corps headquarters. Sponeck issued a general alert for enemy amphibious landings in the Kerch Peninsula. The mass of Sponeck's units had been transferred for the assault on Sevastopol and he had only the 46th Infantry Division under Lieutenant General Kurt Himer who had assumed his command on 17 December, two coastal artillery battalions equipped with obsolete World War I artillery pieces, a combat engineer regiment and a Luftwaffe anti-aircraft battalion. The 46th Infantry Division, mostly up to strength, was woefully overextended holding down the entire Kerch Peninsula against potential Soviet landings. Sponeck's only backup was the Romanian 8th Cavalry Brigade near Alushta.

On the evening of 25 December 1941, the Soviet 224th Rifle Division and 83rd Naval Infantry Brigade were packed into small craft on the Taman Peninsula and began to pass the Kerch Strait.

== Battle ==
=== Kerch landing, 26 December – 28 December ===
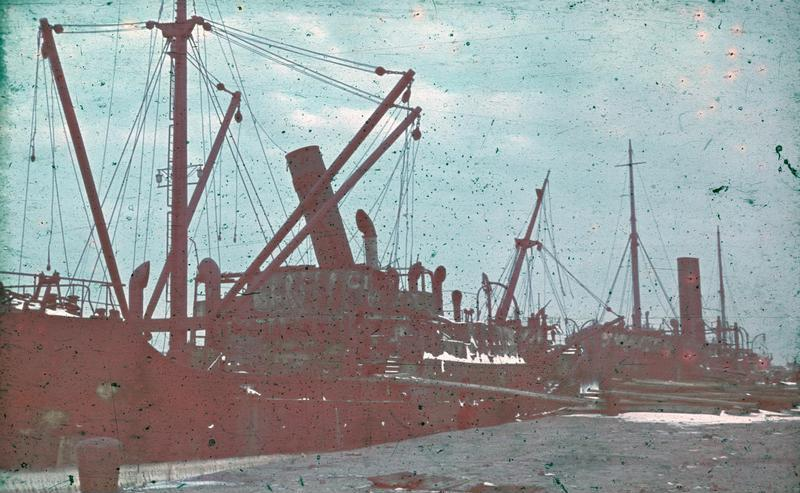
Cargo ship in German-controlled Kerch harbor in the winter of 1941.

Group 2 disembarked at Cape Khroni to the northeast of Kerch. It consisted of the gunboat Don, the transports Krasny Flot and Pyenay, a tugboat, two motor barges that carried three T-26 light tanks and a few artillery pieces, and 16 fishing trawlers. Whaleboats were substituted for landing craft, resulting in tediously slow landings and the drowning of men and equipment. 697 men from the 2nd Battalion of the 160th Rifle Regiment landed at Cape Khroni by 0630 hours on 26 December and many drowned in the waves or were incapacitated by hypothermia. Another rifle battalion landed at Khroni later that day with a platoon of T-26 tanks and light artillery pieces.

At Cape Zyuk, 290 troops got ashore in six hours but a few vessels foundered on the rocky beach. At Cape Tarhan only 18 soldiers got to the beach out of Group 3's landing force of 1,000 men due to a lack of whaleboats. West of Cape Khroni at Bulganak Bay the Azov flotilla landed 1,452 men, three T-26 tanks, two 76mm howitzers and two 45mm anti-tank guns. Two more landings at Kazantip Point and Yenikale were aborted due to stormy weather. By noon, the Red Army had 3,000 lightly armed men ashore north of Kerch in five separate beachheads. German resistance was minimal at first, but by 1050 hours He 111 medium bombers and Ju 87 Stuka dive bombers began attacking the Soviet landing forces. The cargo ship Voroshilov at Cape Tarhan was bombed and sunk with 450 troops aboard. One vessel with 100 men from Group 2 was bombed and sank off Cape Zyuk. Lacking radios, the lightly-armed and half-frozen Soviet formations north of Kerch moved only one kilometer inland before stopping and digging in for German counterattacks. The Soviet regimental commanders, with little to no communications link to headquarters, decided to wait for planned reinforcements that were delayed for three days due to the unfavorable winter weather and never arrived to help them.

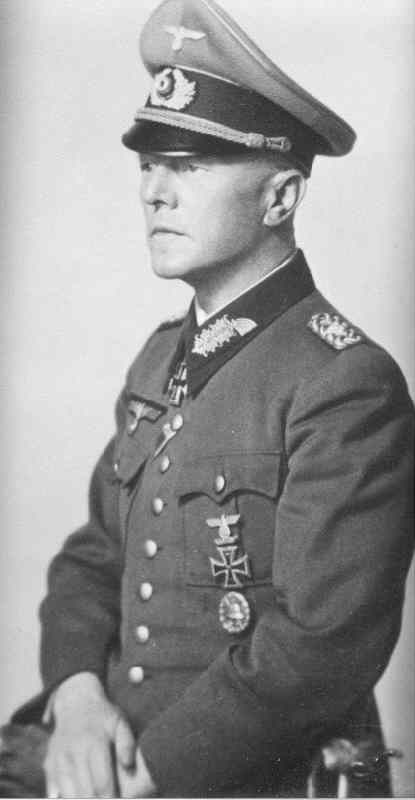
Generalleutnant Hans Graf von Sponeck.

The 302nd Mountain Rifle Division landed at Kamysh Burun south of Kerch and ran into extremely effective German resistance. Two German battalions from Colonel Ernst Maisel's 42nd Infantry Regiment held perfect defensive positions on high ground that dominated the sand beaches. The landing at 0500 hours was stopped by an onslaught of German MG 34 machine gun, mortar and light-artillery fire that prevented the whaleboats and fishing trawlers from advancing to the shore. The 2nd Battalion of the 42nd Infantry Regiment devastated a Soviet landing at Eltigen. A Soviet naval infantry company landed at Stary Karantin but was annihilated by a counterattack from Major Karl Kraft's 1st Battalion/42nd Infantry. The second wave landed at 0700 hours and was also thrown back. Soviet troops seized the docks at Kamysh Burun, allowing the third wave to land there and create a foothold by afternoon. The Luftwaffe sank several ships offshore and only 2,175 troops out of the 5,200-strong Kamysh Burun landing force got ashore.

Lieutenant General Kurt Himer was aware of the Soviet landings by 0610 hours but was uncertain where the Soviet point of main effort was due to the disunited nature of the Soviet forces. He ordered Colonel Friedrich Schmidt's 72nd Infantry Regiment to destroy the Soviet force at Cape Khroni but lacked the troops to deal with the Bulganak Bay and Cape Zyuk formations. Himer improvised by ordering a headquarters company, 3rd Battalion/97th Infantry Regiment and an artillery battery of 10.5 cm howitzers to tackle the Cape Zyuk landing. By midnight, infantry regiment (IR) 97 had its 1st and 3rd Battalions and two artillery batteries in position for a counterattack the next day. At 1350 hours on 26 December, IR 72 reported that a captured Soviet officer from Cape Khroni had revealed the extent of the Soviet plan – to land 25,000 troops at Kerch. Himer acted decisively and decided to bring up 2nd Battalion/IR 97 from Feodosia as well to crush the Cape Zyuk force with IR 97's full strength. IR 42 would contain the Kamysh Burun landings until the northern Soviet forces were destroyed. A mixed alarm unit consisting of infantry, artillery and combat engineers would deal with the Bulganak Bay landing. Army Corps commander Lieutenant General Sponeck requested permission to use the Romanian 8th Cavalry Brigade to reinforce Himer.

The counterattack against Zyuk was launched only at 1300 hours on 27 December due to the muddy roads. The beachhead was flat and devoid of flora, offering no cover for either side. The Soviet 2nd Battalion/83rd Naval Infantry Brigade spotted the German deployment and launched an immediate attack with three T-26 tanks and several infantry companies. A 3.7 cm Pak 36 anti-tank gun fired 42 rounds and knocked out all three Soviet tanks. Several German bombers showed up to support the German infantry and helped drive the Soviet naval infantry back to its beachhead but the Germans delayed their main attack until the next day. At dawn, the two deployed infantry battalions of IR 97 attacked the Soviet position, supported by two 10.5 cm howitzers. A combat engineer company blocked the Soviet escape route to the east. The Soviet defensive position was hopelessly exposed. Six He 111 bombers and a few Stukas bombed the Soviet troops. The Soviet defenses were smashed and by 1200 hours the Germans reached the beach. A number of Soviet troops fought on while waist-deep in the water. Their resistance fell apart by evening; 458 were captured and approximately 300 were killed. Infantry Regiment 97 lost only 40 men killed or wounded in two days of destroying the Soviet beachhead at Cape Zyuk. The Soviet beachhead at Cape Khroni was also destroyed by IR 72 on 28 December, with only 12 men swimming to safety. Himer's division took 1,700 prisoners and only the 1,000-strong Soviet force at Bulganak Bay remained, along with the Kamysh Burun beachhead as well as isolated pockets of Soviet resistance inland.

=== Feodosia landing, 29 December – 2 January ===
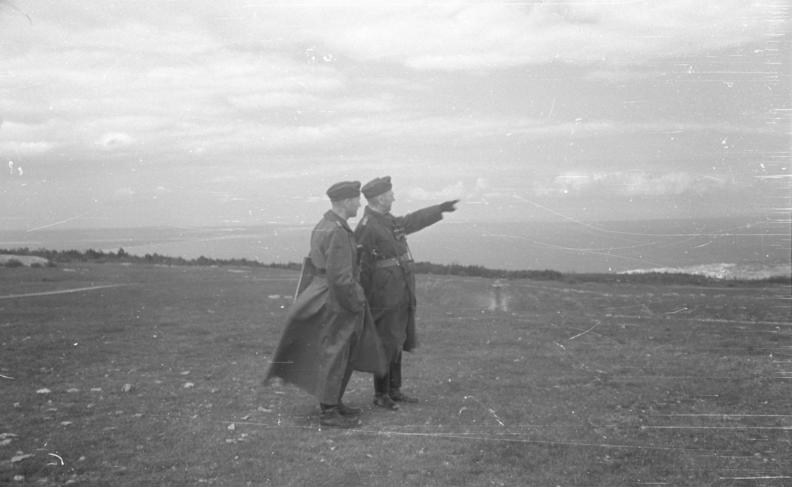
Oberstleutnant Hans von Ahlfen with another officer near Feodosia in May 1942.

Feodosia, a mid-sized town with a pre-war population of 28,000, was lightly defended by two coastal artillery battalions and 800 combat engineers under the command of Oberstleutnant Hans von Ahlfen, which were refitting from the assault on Sevastopol. The artillery units had 17 obsolete World War I-era German and Czech 15 cm and four 10 cm howitzers. The engineers had only small arms. A boom at the harbor entrance was supposed to deny the enemy access but had been left open due to negligence. The Romanian 3rd Rosiori motorized cavalry regiment was in reserve near Feodosia. Two more Romanian mountain infantry and cavalry brigades were halfway toward Kerch to crush the Soviet landings there.

The 44th Army began loading up men and equipment at 1300 hours on 28 December into an invasion fleet at Novorossiysk, which consisted of two light cruisers, eight destroyers, 14 transports and dozens of small craft. At 1730, the advance guard consisting of the Soviet cruiser Krasnyi Kavkaz, the Fidonisy-class destroyers Shaumyan, Zhelezniakov, and Nezamozhnik and patrol boats and minesweepers steamed towards Feodosia in relatively favorable weather permitting speeds of 16 knots. The destroyer Sposobnyi struck a naval mine and sank with 200 casualties. The Soviet troops were exposed to freezing weather and suffered from hypothermia and seasickness. Two Soviet submarines waited above the surface at Feodosiya harbor to mark the port entrance with lights. At 0350 hours on 29 December, the Soviet destroyers Shaumyan and Zhelezniakov showed up at Feodosia, fired star shells for illumination and followed up with a 13-minute barrage on the German defenses. Four MO-class small guard ships carrying 60 naval infantrymen secured the lighthouse at the harbor mole. The naval infantrymen, led by Lieutenant Arkady F. Aydinov, captured two 3.7 cm Pak anti-tank guns and launched green flares to signal the all-clear for the follow-up forces. The German II./AR 54 gunners engaged the Soviet patrol boats without hitting them. Beginning at 0426 hours, the destroyer Shaumyan inserted a company of naval infantrymen in 20 minutes into the harbor. The destroyers Zhelezniakov and Nyezamozhnik landed more reinforcements soon after. Shaumyan was damaged by German artillery fire.

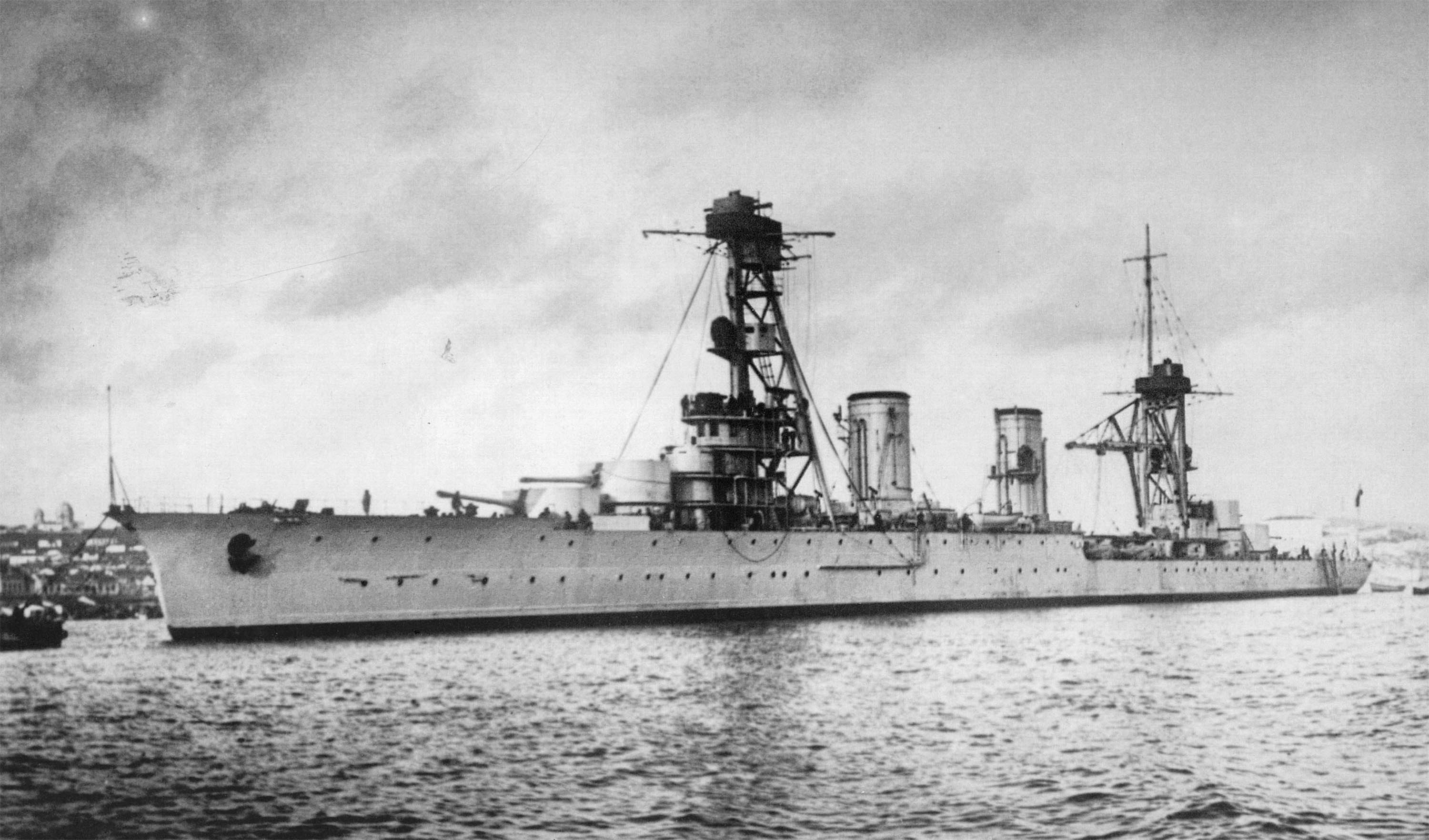
Soviet cruiser Krasnyi Kavkaz

At 0500 hours, the cruiser Krasnyi Kavkaz began unloading 1,853 soldiers from the 633rd Rifle Regiment of the 157th Rifle Division at the mole. The Germans concentrated all of their fire on the cruiser, hitting it 17 times and setting its No. 2 gun turret on fire. Krasnyi Kavkaz responded with its 180 mm batteries, landed its troops in three hours and then departed the harbor. The Luftwaffe arrived above the battlefield and sank a minesweeper and a patrol boat in the morning, but missed its chance to stop the main force from landing. By 0730, the Soviets were in full control of the port and began landing artillery and vehicles. The Soviets fought their way through the town and by 1000 hours the Germans fled after a brief fight. In a quickly executed operation, the Soviets landed 4,500 troops in the morning and parts of three divisions were ashore by the end of the day. Sponeck immediately ordered the Romanian 8th Cavalry Brigade and 4th Mountain Brigade to turn around and form defensive positions around the Soviet bridgehead at Feodosia. He requested permission from 11th Army commander General der Infanterie Erich von Manstein to withdraw the 46th Infantry Division from Kerch to avoid its encirclement but Manstein refused, ordering Sponeck to throw the enemy back into the sea with the help of reinforcements in the form of Gruppe Hitzfeld from the 73rd Infantry Division and the entire 170th Infantry Division, which would crush the Soviet landing force at Feodosia. Sponeck then disobeyed orders, cut off contact with 11th Army headquarters and at 0830 hours on 29 December, ordered the 46th Infantry Division to retreat west from Kerch to avoid encirclement. Sponeck's order was highly controversial. There were insufficient German forces at Feodosia to stop further Soviet advances, but there were 20,000 Romanian troops in the vicinity and strong German reinforcements on the way. Two Romanian brigades launched a counterattack on 30 December, but were defeated in large part due to their insufficient air and artillery support.

The 46th Infantry Division retreated 120 kilometers through a snowstorm in two days from 30–31 December. A number of vehicles were abandoned due to a lack of fuel. Moving from Feodosia, the Soviet 63rd Mountain Infantry Division established a roadblock by the morning of 31 December and after a brief fight, the 46th took a detour cross country through a narrow 10-kilometer gap between the lead Soviet elements and the Sea of Azov. The 46th avoided encirclement, but suffered moderate equipment losses and light personnel casualties. It established a new defensive line to the east of Islam Terek. On 31 December, 250 Soviet paratroopers jumped from 16 TB-3 bombers to close the gap between the Red Army and the Sea of Azov. The bombers were unsuitable for airborne operations and the Soviet paratroopers were too dispersed for decisive action. They caused a degree of worry at XXXXII Corps headquarters due to the darkness, which concealed the limited nature of the operation. Sponeck was relieved of his command on 29 December for insubordination and court-martialed in Germany three weeks later. He was replaced by 72nd Infantry Division commander General der Infanterie Franz Mattenklott. Army Group South commander-in-chief Generaloberst Walther von Reichenau ordered that, "because of its slack reaction to the Russian landing on the Kerch Peninsula, as well as its precipitate withdrawal from the Peninsula, I hereby declare 46. Infanterie-Division forfeit of soldierly honor. Decorations and promotions are in abeyance until countermanded." 302nd Mountain Division attacked from its Kamysh Burun bridgehead to capture Kerch on 31 December after 46th Infantry Division's retreat. The 51st Army had four rifle divisions ashore and liberated the eastern Kerch Peninsula on 1 January.

By 1 January XXXXII Army Corps had a defensive line 20 kilometers west of Feodosia. Gruppe Hitzfeld, led by Otto Hitzfeld, arrived with IR 213 from the 73rd Infantry Division, an artillery battalion, an anti-tank gun battalion (Panzerjäger-Abteilung 173), four StuG III assault guns and an anti-aircraft detachment. The Soviet 236th Rifle Division attacked the Romanian 4th Mountain Brigade and gained ground. The Soviets advanced only 10 kilometers in three days after landing at Feodosia on 29 December. Their failure to cut off the 46th Infantry Division and destroy the Romanian brigades was criticized by Manstein as a missed Soviet opportunity to destroy the entire 11th Army. On 1 January the 44th Army had 23,000 troops ashore in three rifle divisions but this was insufficient for sustained offensive operations against Manstein. A Soviet infantry-armored attack on the XXXXII headquarters at Islam-Terek failed after 16 T-26 tanks were knocked out by the fresh Panzerjäger-Abteilung 173. By 2 January, the follow-up effects of the Soviet success at Feodosia fizzled out and the 44th Army's combat operations degenerated into a static defense.

The Soviet landings prevented the fall of Sevastopol and seized the initiative. They did not succeed in their main objective of relieving Sevastopol. Casualties were high. The Soviet forces involved in the Kerch-Feodosia landing operation from 26 December 1941 through 2 January 1942 lost 41,935 men, including 32,453 killed or captured and 9,482 wounded or sick.

During the offensive, Soviet photojournalist Dmitri Baltermants took a famous photograph "Grief". The photograph depicts the site of a massacre of civilians by the Germans near Kerch: grief-stricken people wander across a field, searching for relatives among the corpses lying in the muddy snow.

=== German counterattack, 15 January – 20 January ===
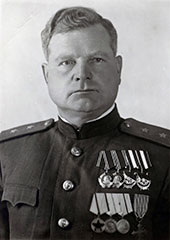
Lieutenant General Dmitry Timofeyevich Kozlov commanded the Crimean Front during the battle

The 51st Army moved with extreme slowness from Kerch, reaching the Parpach Narrows on 5 January but deploying only two rifle divisions in its forward elements on 12 January. It conducted no offensive action against the 46th Infantry Division aside from minor static warfare raiding. The Axis response was far quicker. Mattenklott's XXXXII Corps received the 170th and 132nd Infantry Divisions as reinforcements along with two battalions from the 72nd Infantry Division, c. 5 StuG III assault guns and the Romanian 18th Infantry Division. Its task was to hold the line against the 51st Army. Manstein also diverted the XXX Corps under Generalmajor Maximilian Fretter-Pico from the siege of Sevastopol to lead a counteroffensive composed of four Axis divisions that were in place by 13 January. The objective was to recapture Feodosia and throw the 44th Army off balance. Luftwaffe reinforcements poured in to meet Manstein's demand for air support and a new Special Staff Crimea was created under the command Robert Ritter von Greim to lead operations in the peninsula. Kozlov's Transcaucasian Front (which had now become the Caucasus Front) leadership did not believe the Axis were strong enough to mount an attack and did not order his two armies to dig in. Prior to his planned main offensive, he landed 226 soldiers on board the destroyer Sposobnyi 40 kilometers southwest of Feodosia as a diversion but succeeded in drawing off only one company of Panzerjäger to contain it – which Kozlov translated as weakness.

On 16 January, Kozlov landed the 226th Rifle Regiment behind German lines at Sudak. Supported by the battleship Parizhskaya Kommuna, the cruiser Krasnyi Krym and four destroyers, the Soviet Sudak Landing quickly dispersed the small Romanian garrison in the town with naval gunfire. After wading ashore, the Soviet regiment sat tight and entrenched itself. Manstein correctly saw the operation as a distraction and sent only a token watch force to keep the Soviets occupied. The Soviet landing force at Sudak initially resisted the counterattacks of two Romanian infantry battalions. The Germans used their airpower and artillery to reduce the Soviet force through attrition warfare. The 226th Rifle Regiment had no supporting artillery, anti-tank armament or mortars and could not fight back. Kozlov sent more troops to Sudak from 24 through 26 January to bring the total number of troops landed to 4,264. XXX Corps deployed more reinforcements to crush the Soviet units and by 28 January the battle was over. 2,000 Soviet troops were killed at Sudak, another 876 prisoners were taken and executed, 350–500 joined local resistance groups, while the rest laid low in the wilderness. Fretter-Pico tasked a Romanian mountain infantry battalion with mopping up operations, which continued for five months until June.

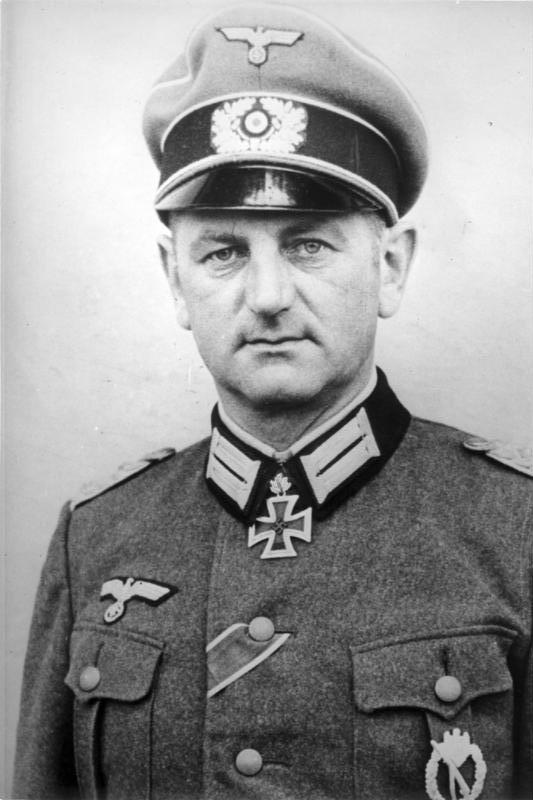
Oberst Otto Hitzfeld led the attack that recaptured Feodosia. He was awarded the Knight's Cross of the Iron Cross with Oak Leaves on 17 January 1942 and is seen wearing it on this 25 February 1942 photo.

The Soviet 236th Rifle Division's forward security zone was 20 kilometers west of Feodosia and the main line of resistance ran atop a major ridge 15 kilometers from the town. At daybreak on 15 January, He 111 medium bombers and Stuka dive bombers began attacking the Soviet positions on the ridge and were preceded by a quick artillery preparation. German bombers located the 44th Army headquarters, destroyed it and severely wounded its commander, throwing the Soviet leadership into chaos. Otto Hitzfeld's IR 213 attacked, supported by two battalions from the 46th Infantry Division (ID) and three StuG IIIs. The Germans achieved complete surprise and swiftly overran the Soviet positions. The StuGs knocked out two T-26 tanks but lost one of their own to a Soviet 76.2 mm anti-tank gun. The ridge-line west of Feodosia was in German hands by afternoon, along with a dominant position over the 44th Army. In the north, 46 ID and the Romanian 8th Cavalry Brigade launched distraction attacks against 51st Army and succeeded in drawing the majority of the Soviet reserves into an irrelevant sector. Fretter-Pico's XXX Corps lost 500 men killed, wounded and missing in its 15 January attack against the 236th Rifle Division. In exchange, five German infantry battalions backed up by powerful air support and several assault guns crushed a Soviet division and established an ascendancy over the 44th Army.

The German counteroffensive continued on 16 January. Fretter-Pico reinforced Hitzfeld with more battalions as the Soviet 63rd Mountain and 236th Rifle Divisions lost ground and were pushed into narrow, isolated sectors close to the sea. In the afternoon, the 132nd Infantry Division began deploying for an attack into Feodosia. The Luftwaffe bombed the Red Army at Feodosia with impunity. The Soviets mistakenly located the German main point of effort at Vladislavovka to the north of Feodosia and launched a battalion-sized armored-infantry counterattack there. They were stopped in their tracks by Sturmgeschütz-Abteilung 190 StuG IIIs, which knocked out 16 T-26 tanks. 32 ID assaulted Feodosia at dawn on 17 January. The Red Army troops in the town fought on through heavy street combat but were badly hampered by constant Stuka attacks as well as German artillery and machine gun fire. Impenetrable black smoke clouds formed above the burning buildings. Owing to ceaseless German airstrikes, a Black Sea Fleet evacuation of the trapped 236th Rifle Division failed. The formation was destroyed and 5,300 prisoners were taken by Fretter-Pico's men on 17 January. Its commanding officer escaped but was convicted and executed by a Soviet military tribunal three weeks later.

XXX Corps' attack intensified on 19 January as the remaining two divisions of the 44th Army were pursued along the Black Sea coast, unraveling the Soviet forward positions to the north. On 20 January, the XXXXII and XXX Corps reached the Parpach Narrows, greatly shortening the front-line. Kozlov was thrown into a panic and predicted the Soviet landing force's complete destruction. The Soviets paid the price for their slow westward deployment from Kerch, as they lacked the reserves to throw back this new and potent German threat. Soviet generals complained about the impassable roads, although this did not stop the German 46th Infantry Division from executing a fast march over the same terrain in late December. Both sides began to construct defensive positions reinforced by dugouts, trenches and barbed wire. XXX Corps defeated the 44th Army in five days, threw two Soviet armies on the defensive, killed an estimated 6,700 Soviet troops, destroyed 85 tanks and took 10,000 prisoners and 177 guns for the cost of 995 casualties, of which 243 were killed or missing. The Caucasus Front, having lost 115,630 men in January, was too shaken and weakened by Manstein's rapid counter-stroke and the Luftwaffe's anti-shipping campaign to mount large-scale offensive operations for more than a month. The Germans lacked armor and sufficient air units to maximally exploit their victory.

=== Battle of the Parpach Narrows, 27 February – 11 April ===
Stavka reinforced the Caucasus Front Front with nine rifle divisions. Soviet engineers built an ice road across the frozen Kerch Strait, enabling 96,618 men, 23,903 horses and 6,519 motor vehicles to reinforce the Kerch peninsula forces. The 47th Army was deployed to the area, initially with only two rifle divisions. The Stavka created the Crimean Front under, with Kozlov as its commander, on 28 January, with the 44th, 47th and 51st Armies belonging to it organically and the Separate Coastal Army and Black Sea Fleet falling under its operational command. Kozlov had little command experience beyond the regimental level and his staff was as inept. Stavka representative Lev Mekhlis arrived at the Crimean Front HQ in late January and introduced his own ideas into the planning stage. Stalin and Mekhlis wanted to liberate Crimea with an offensive on 13 February, but the Soviet forces were unequal to the task. Soviet troops lacked food and three 76mm artillery regiments had no ammunition at all. The backward nature of the Kerch peninsula's road network, the muddy roads and the Luftwaffe's bombing campaign against ports and Soviet cargo shipping prevented a sufficient logistical buildup and made Stalin's demand unrealistic. On 27 February Kozlov finally had available for his operation the required 93,804 troops, 1,195 guns and mortars, 125 anti-tank guns, 194 tanks and 200 aircraft. These forces were assembled in nine rifle divisions at the front along with numerous tank brigades containing T-26, T-34 and 36 KV-1 tanks. The Soviets were far from ready. Their tanks and aircraft lacked fuel supplies, many weapons did not work, the Soviet artillery had not organized a fire system, communications between Kozlov's HQ and the Crimean Front armies were repeatedly cut off, and engineers had not constructed field works of any kind. Under pressure from Stalin, Kozlov started his attack anyway.

==== First Offensive, 27 February – 3 March ====
The 51st Army planned to attack in the north on 27 February across a flat, 80-square kilometer plain dotted only by a handful of small villages. The Germans fortified the villages of Tulumchak, Korpech’, and Koi-Asan. The German 46th and 132nd Infantry Divisions held the XXXXII Corps front along with the Romanian 18th Infantry Division. Gruppe Hitzfeld waited in reserve. The Axis defensive preparations were extensive and in accordance with German tactical doctrine. Reinforced German strongpoints had all-around defenses, neutralizing the effects of simultaneous Soviet frontal and flank attacks, and the Germans created a system of engineering works permeated with augmented artillery fires. Mattenklott made the mistake of putting the Romanian 18th Infantry Regiment into a difficult and exposed position in a salient on the northern part of the line. The Soviet planners, led by Tolbukhin, failed to account for the warm weather that turned the terrain into a sea of mud.

51st Army's offensive kicked off at 0630 hours on 27 February with a 230-gun artillery preparation of which most were light 76 mm guns and only 30 were heavy 122 mm guns. The fortified German strongpoints were largely unharmed by the light high-explosive rounds. German artillery responded with its own fire and the Soviets lacked the counter-battery capabilities to suppress them. The open terrain provided no cover for the Red Army soldiers, who were systematically killed and wounded in great numbers by incessant German artillery strikes. The heavy Soviet KV-1s sank into the mud and could not get forward. Vehicles were also stuck and Soviet artillery shells had to be carried by hand. Confused Soviet soldiers trampled their comrades to death in the mud.

The German strongpoint at Tulumchak was overrun by T-26 tanks and infantry, although seven tanks were lost to German Teller mines; and the Romanian 18th Infantry Regiment was routed. A German artillery battalion in support of the Romanians lost all 18 of its 10.5 cm leFH howitzers and 14 3.7 cm PaK guns. Kozlov's push was supported by 100 Air Force of the Crimean Front sorties that day, while the Luftwaffe flew only three sorties in the area. After a five-kilometer Soviet penetration, Gruppe Hitzfeld sealed off the attack with artillery, anti-tank and machine-gun fire. Strongpoint Korpech’ remained in German hands and subjected the attacking Soviets to withering machine gun and mortar fire. Kozlov added the 77th Mountain Rifle Division into the right-wing attack at the plain, while Mattenklott redeployed Hitzfeld's IR 213 and I./IR 105 to help out the Romanians. Hitzfeld attacked on 28 February and took back a part of the lost ground. The Romanians proved brittle and 100 were captured as the 77th Mountain Rifle Division made a small penetration and captured Kiet hamlet, threatening to outflank all of 11th Army. Hitzfeld counterattacked and retook Kiet, stabilizing the line. The Soviet attack against the Romanians continued on 1 March until it was stopped by the arrival of the German 170th Infantry Division. The rest of the Soviet effort slackened. The 44th Army's weak attacks failed to tie down all German troops opposite it and could not prevent reinforcements from moving to the threatened north. The Soviets lost 40 tanks in three days from 27 February – 1 March. Soviet naval bombardments of Feodosia and Yalta achieved little, as did a small and quickly withdrawn landing at Alushta on 1 March.

The German strongpoint at Koi-Asan, held by IR 42 and 72 in the junction between XXXXII and XXX Corps was the pivot of Manstein's defense and its control allowed the Germans to feed reserves into the north with little difficulty. Kozlov directed two rifle divisions, three tank brigades and a tank battalion to take the village on 2 March. German obstacles slowed down the Soviet tanks, turning them into easy targets for German anti-tank units and artillery. The Luftwaffe made its presence felt with 40 Stuka sorties on the overcrowded Soviet tank masses. The Soviets admitted to losing 93 tanks in one day. Their gains were comparatively minor: four Czech-made German howitzers were destroyed and the Soviet Air Forces bombed and destroyed a 23-ton ammunition dump at Vladislavovka. The Soviets called off their attack on 3 March. Kozlov's big push failed and from 27 February he suffered extremely heavy losses of infantry and tanks, including 28 KV-1s. He had gained an exposed salient, which he could hold only with light forces due to its lack of cover.

==== Second Offensive, 13 March – 15 March ====
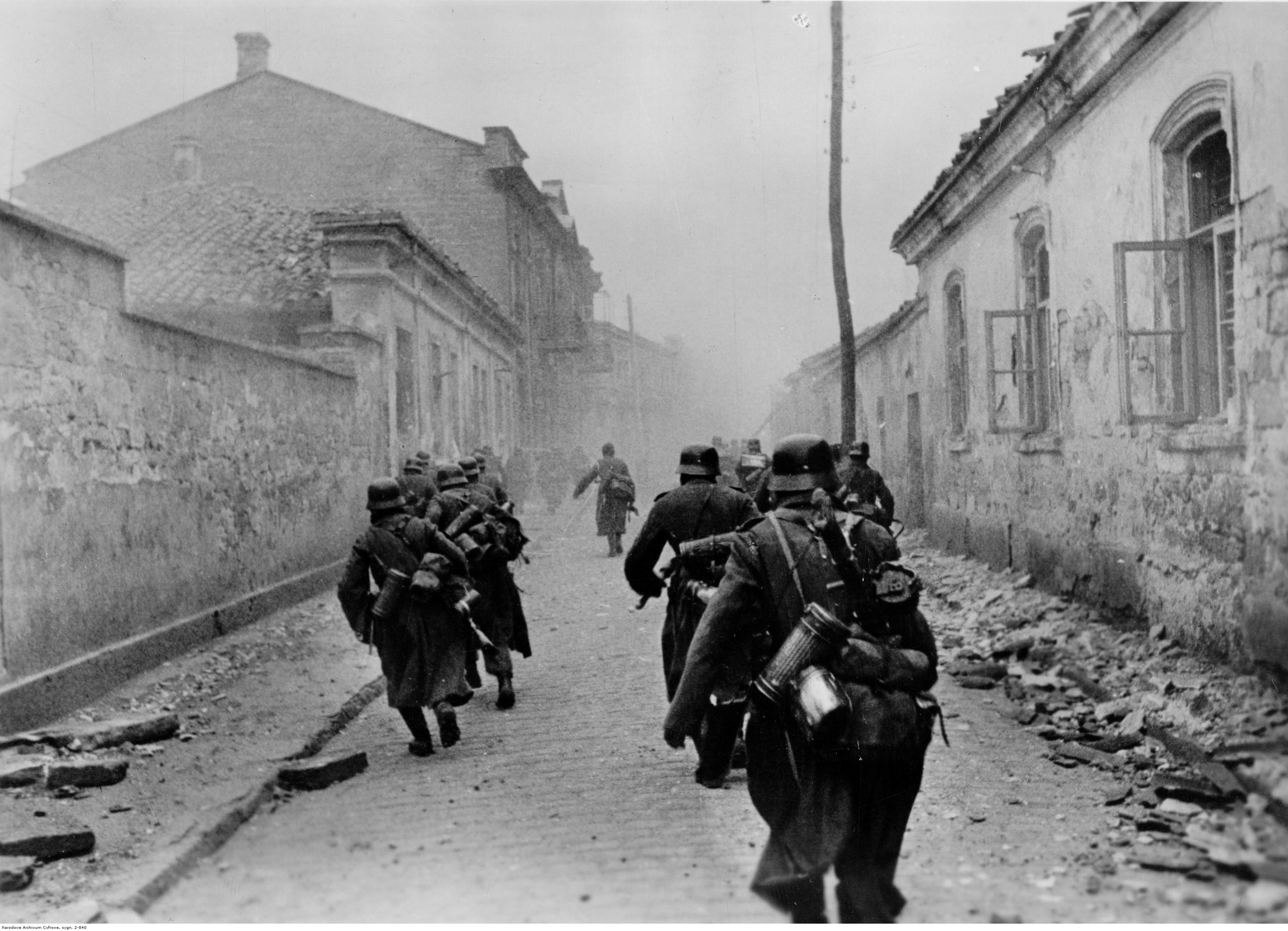
German soldiers during street fighting in Crimea, March 1942.

Kozlov blamed the weather for his failure, while Mekhlis decided the fault lay with Tolbukhin's inept planning and had him fired. Stalin ordered the second offensive to proceed in ten days. The Soviet planning staffs saw Koi-Asan as the priority target and decided to mass 51st Army's striking power against it. The 44th Army would launch a significant feint attack on the 132nd Infantry Division along the coast. Kozlov had 224 tanks, but on Mekhlis' recommendation he decided to share them between the rifle divisions instead of massing them in a strike force. Stalin reinforced the Air Force of the Crimean Front to 581 aircraft by early March, though they were largely obsolete models. The Germans laid down 2,000 Teller mines near the Koi-Asan position and Manstein concentrated assault guns for its defense.

The Soviets attacked at 0900 hours on 13 March with three rifle divisions that were quickly cut to pieces in the boggy terrain. The supporting Red Army tanks were easily destroyed by StuG IIIs and anti-tank guns. Lieutenant Johann Spielmann's StuG III destroyed 14 T-34s in one day while Fritz Schrödel's StuG III destroyed eight Soviet tanks, of which two were KV-1s. Soviet tank losses were large, with 157 tanks destroyed in three days. The 56th Tank Brigade lost 88 tanks. The Soviet attempt to capture Koi-Asan failed yet again but the fighting had been bitter. The German 46th Infantry Division repulsed at least 10 Soviet attacks during the three-day offensive. On 24 March, strongpoint Korpech’ fell to the 51st Army after the Soviet infantry suffered heavy losses. The Crimean Front had fired off most of its artillery ammunition and could not proceed further despite its limited success. II./JG 77, a German fighter wing, arrived in Crimea after refitting and began to weaken Soviet air superiority. The 60-ton ammunition dump at Vladislavovka was again blown up by Soviet bombers.

==== German counterattack, 20 March ====
The 22nd Panzer Division was a fresh German armored division and was tasked by Manstein with the recapture of Korpech’. The division was not yet fully equipped with its supporting elements and its tanks were mostly obsolete Czech-built Panzer 38(t)s. Its attack at 0600 hours on 20 March in dense fog ran headlong into an offensive buildup of Soviet armor and went badly wrong. One of the division's battalions had to stop after meeting a minefield, while another lost cohesion in the fog. The Soviet 55th Tank Brigade blocked the road to Korpech’ with a battalion of T-26s and four KV-1s. A battalion of Regiment 204 lost 40% of its tanks destroyed or damaged after running into a concentration of Soviet 45 mm anti-tank guns. After three hours the German attack was called off. 22nd Panzer lost 32 of 142 tanks destroyed or damaged, including 17 Panzer 38(t), nine Panzer II and six Panzer IV. Manstein conceded he had prematurely committed an inexperienced, half-deployed division into an all-out assault but pointed out that an immediate counterattack was necessary as his army was in danger of losing its critical defensive positions. Also, the division did succeed in disrupting the Soviet attack preparations.

==== Third Offensive, 26 March ====
Kozlov's third drive on Koi-Asan began after a week of replacements, restocking and reinforcements; it was a smaller operation conducted by the 390th Rifle Division and 143rd Rifle Brigade of the 51st Army, supported by two T-26 companies, six KVs, and three T-34s from the 39th and 40th Tank Brigades and the 229th Separate Tank Battalion. It failed on the first day after immense losses and quickly died down. As a result of these operations, the 51st Army suffered losses of 9,852 killed, 4,959 missing, and 23,799 wounded for a total of more than 39,000 casualties between 10 and 31 March.

==== Fourth Offensive, 9 April – 11 April ====
Mounting Luftwaffe air superiority began to tell as Kerch port came under heavy and sustained German air attack, constraining the buildup of Soviet armor and artillery. Mekhlis demanded that massed tank attacks be made against the unbroken German lines. Manstein received more reinforcements in the form of the 28th Light Infantry Division, which was equipped with the new, easily concealed, low-silhouette 2.8 cm sPzB 41 light anti-tank gun. One of its soldiers, Obergefreiter Emanuel Czernik, destroyed seven T-26s and one BT tank in one day with the weapon. Manstein estimated the Soviet attack strength as six to eight rifle divisions and 160 tanks. After three days of heavy losses, Kozlov called off his fourth and as it turned out, final offensive. He withdrew back to his February starting positions by 15 April. The Crimean Front was now heavily weighted toward its right flank – 51st Army – leaving the 44th Army on the left depleted and the 47th Army in reserve a ghost command.

Kozlov's four major offensives from 27 February through 11 April were all defeated by Manstein's 11th Army with heavy Soviet losses. From 1 January to 30 April, Kozlov's Crimean Front, including the forces at Sevastopol, lost 352,000 men of which 236,370 were lost from February through April in the Parpach Narrows fighting. The Front's losses were the second-heaviest of any Soviet Front during the period. The offensives cost the Crimean Front 40 percent of its manpower, 52 percent of its tanks, and 25 percent of its artillery. Axis 11th Army casualties from January to April 1942 were far fewer at 24,120 men. The result was an unbalanced loss ratio of 14–1. Insufficient artillery and air support and ignorance of the German defenses were singled out by Soviet critics as the causes of the failure. The Crimean Front had been all but destroyed as a combat-effective formation and would be completely routed from the peninsula in May. For four months, Manstein had conducted a successful defense on two fronts at once. The spring thaw arrived in early May, and both sides prepared for the battle that would decide the campaign.

=== Luftwaffe anti-shipping operations ===
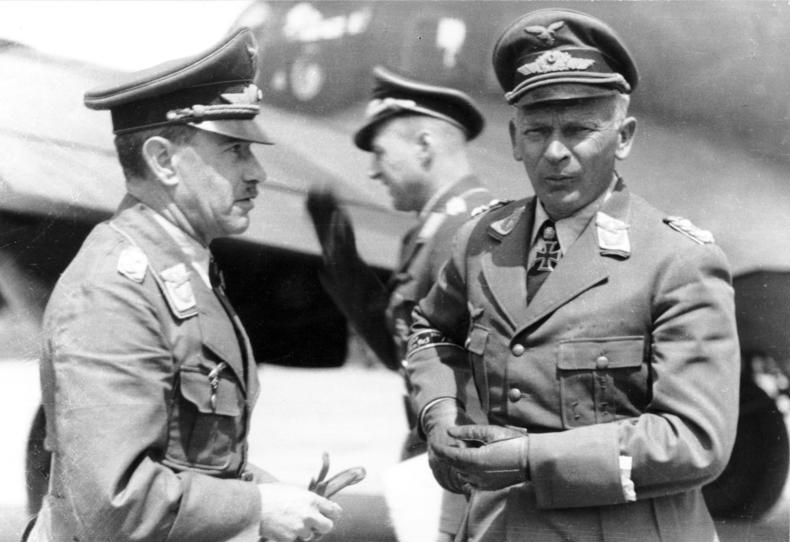
Alexander Löhr, commander of Luftflotte 4 (left) and Wolfram von Richthofen, commander of VIII. Fliegerkorps in February 1942.

To slow the Soviet build-up, Alexander Löhr's Luftflotte 4 was sent to the region to interdict shipping. The 7,500-ton transport Emba was severely damaged on 29 January, but the Luftwaffe failed to prevent the transport of 100,000 men and hundreds of artillery pieces to Kerch between 20 January and 11 February. At Sevastopol, 764 tons of fuel and 1700 tons of supplies arrived at the port. On 13 February, the cruiser Komintern and destroyer Shaumyan brought in 1,034 soldiers and 200 tons of supplies. The cruiser Krasnyi Krym and destroyer Dzerzhinskiy brought in a further 1,075 men on 14 February. The next day, the minesweeper T410 brought in 650 and evacuated 152. On 17 February, the transport Byelostok brought in 871 men. The Black Sea Fleet regularly shelled German positions on the coast. The Luftwaffe increased its pressure, dispatching KG 27, KG 55, and KG 100 to bomb the ports at Anapa, Tuapse, and Novorossiysk on the Caucasian Black Sea coast. On 20 February, the 1,900-ton transport Kommunist was sunk by KG 100.

Meanwhile, the Luftwaffe had flown in the specialist torpedo bomber unit KG 26. On 1/2 March 1942, it damaged the 2,434-ton steamer Fabritsius so severely that it was written off. The 4,629-ton oil tanker Kuybyshev was damaged on 3 March south of Kerch, which deprived the Soviets of much fuel. It was withdrawn to the port of Novorossiysk where it was crippled by Ju 88s of KG 51 on 13 March. On 18 March, KG 51 Ju 88s sank the 3,689-ton transport Georgiy Dimitrov. Further damage was done on 23 March when nine Ju 88s of KG 51 sank the minelayers Ostrovskiy and GS-13 and a motor torpedo boat in Tuapse harbour. They also damaged two submarines (S-33 and D-5). That evening, He 111s of KG 27 claimed one 5,000-ton and two 2,000-ton ships sunk. Soviet records recorded the sinking of the 2,960-ton steamer V. Chapayev, with the loss of 16 crew and 86 soldiers. KG 51 returned to Tuapse on 24 March and sank the transports Yalta and Neva. On 2 April, the Kuybyshev was intercepted and sunk. So great was the loss of shipping that Soviet land forces were ordered to cease all offensive operations to conserve supplies. In the eight-week air offensive, from early February to the end of March, the Black Sea Transport Fleet had been reduced from 43,200 tons of shipping to 27,400 tons. Six transports had been lost and six were under repair. On 17 April, the 4,125-ton steamer Svanetiya was sunk by KG 26 during an attempt to supply Sevastopol. Approximately 535 men were lost. On 19 April, the tanker I. Stalin was damaged along with three other transports. On 21 April, KG 55 damaged the minesweeper Komintern and sank a transport ship. By this time the Black Sea Fleet's ability to supply the Soviet forces in Sevastopol was severely curtailed.

=== Operation Bustard Hunt, 8 May – 19 May ===
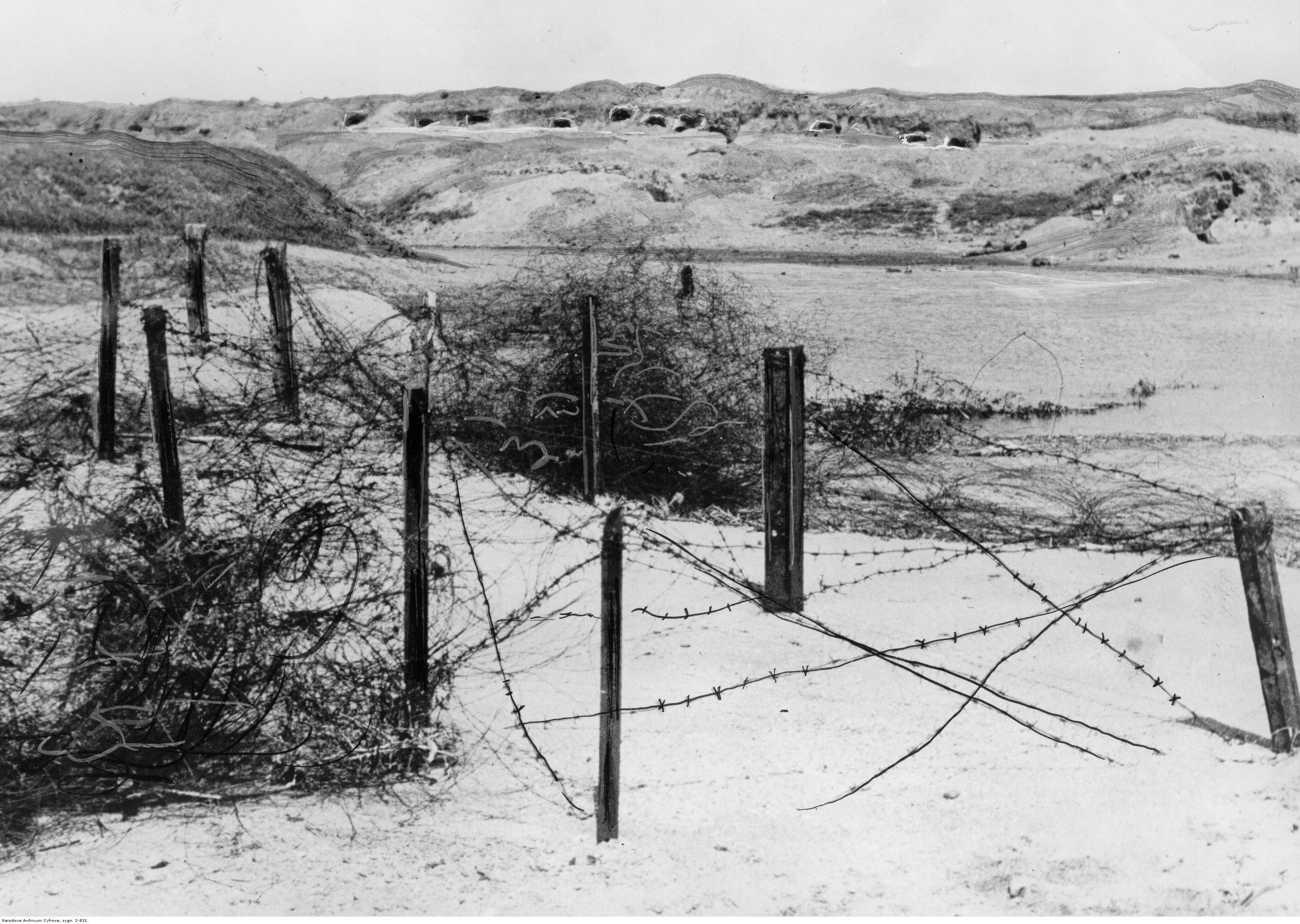
Soviet fortifications and barbed wire on the Kerch Peninsula, May 1942

The Germans launched Operation Trappenjagd on 8 May 1942. ("Trappenjagd" is a German compound noun meaning "bustard hunt".) Prior to the offensive, the Luftwaffe succeeded in applying severe pressure to the Soviet supply lines. By late April food and other resources were virtually exhausted. Everything, including firewood had to be brought in by sea. The Stavka asked Stalin to consider the evacuation of the Kerch region. Stalin refused, and on 21 April ordered preparations for an offensive to retake the Crimea. On 6 May, he changed his mind and issued Order No. 170357, which ordered all forces to assume a defensive posture. He also refused to send more reinforcements. Mixed in with this order, was a limited offensive operation against German lines to improve the defenders' tactical positions. Instead of preparing for a defense against the impending German offensive, the Soviets were preparing for an attack.

For the defence of the peninsula, the Soviets had three armies; the 51st, protecting the north, had eight rifle divisions and three rifle and two tank brigades, while the 44th Army in the south had five rifle divisions and two tank brigades. The 47th Army, with four rifle and one cavalry division, was kept in reserve. The Air Force of the Crimean Front deployed 404 aircraft. Kozlov did not expect a major attack as he outnumbered the Germans two to one. Moreover, on the southern front, he had swampy terrain, which made it an unfavorable place for offensive operations. Although the Soviets constructed an anti-tank ditch that ran the entire length of the Parpach Narrows and had three lines of defense, the infantry units were deployed in one line at the front, with the tanks and cavalry in reserve. Kozlov failed to deploy his troops into a well-prepared defense-in-depth.

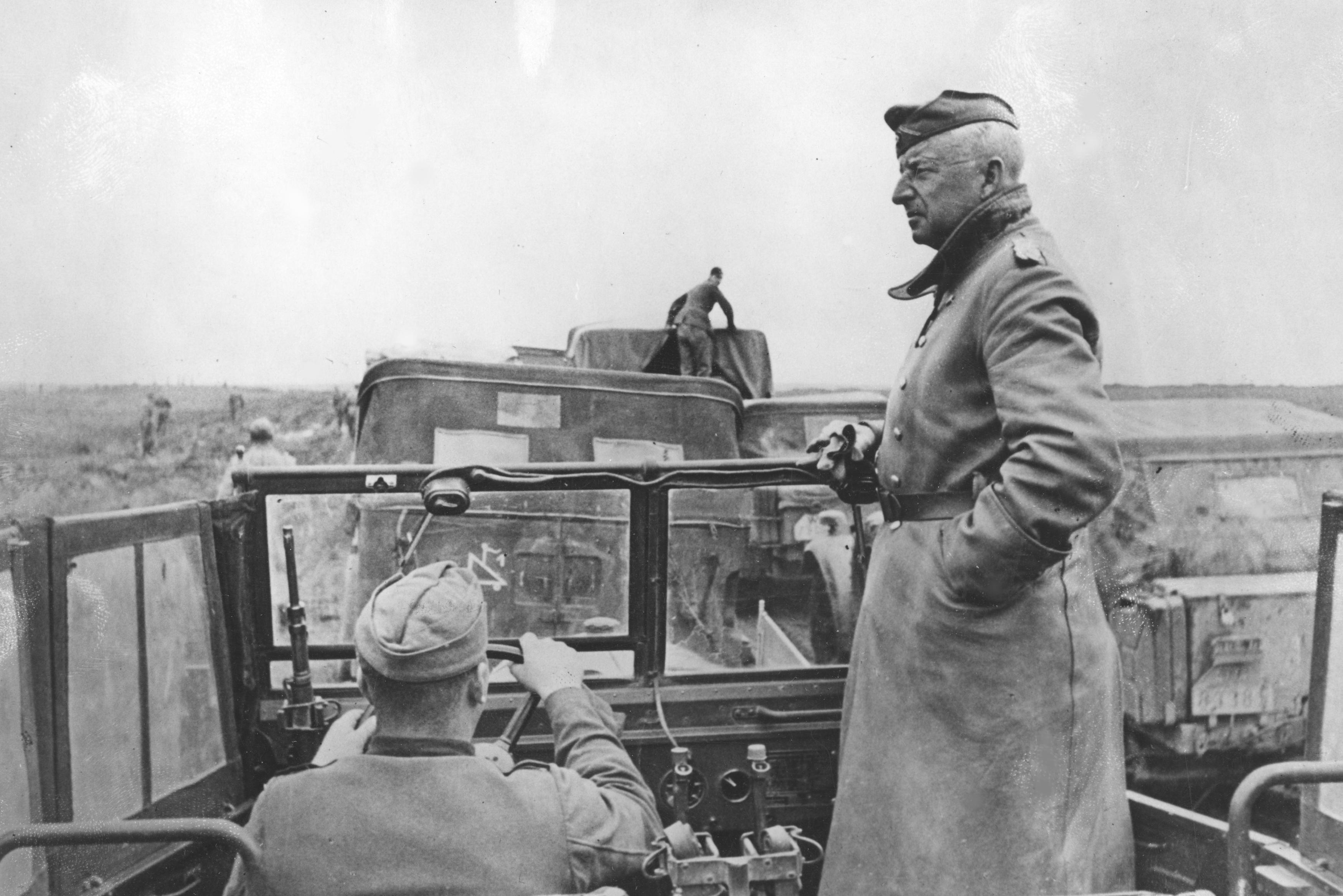
Manstein at the frontline in the Kerch Peninsula, May 1942.

The German offensive had no option but to break through the Soviet lines in the south head-on and then swing north with armored and motorized units to encircle the 51st Army. To do this, it needed exceptionally strong air support. Fliegerkorps VIII under the command of Wolfram Freiherr von Richthofen was sent to support the assault. The unit was the best equipped close air support corps in the Luftwaffe. To bolster its strength, it was given the experienced KG 55 medium bomber wing. Richthofen had 20 Gruppen comprising 740 aircraft and a number of seaplanes. Two Kampfgruppen were also made available by the 4th Air Corps of General Kurt Pflugbeil. The corps operated from newly built airfields as Richthofen had the airfield system expanded to reduce bomber sortie times. He was also fascinated and delighted by the 2 kilogram SD-2 anti-personnel cluster bombs and had more than 6,000 canisters of them delivered by the end of April. By 8 May, he had 800 aircraft under his command in the Crimea and Soviet air superiority in the area had collapsed. The limited Soviet air reconnaissance failed to spot this buildup.

To maximize surprise, Manstein selected the swampy terrain held by the 44th Army as his main attack sector. Fretter-Pico's XXX Corps would breach the Soviet lines, allowing the 22nd Panzer Division to run riot through the gaps. Improved tactics for breaking through heavily defended enemy lines were utilised, built on the integration of infantry assault groups, assault guns, combat engineers, Panzerjäger and flak units. Fretter-Pico received 57 StuG IIIs, 12 of which had the new 7.5 cm KwK 40 gun, two batteries of 8.8 cm Flak and ample combat engineer support. Only one German infantry division and the Romanians were in the north, while the rest were under Fretter-Pico's command.

Trappenjagd began at 04:15 on 8 May. Fliegerkorps VIII operating under Luftflotte 4, began operations against lines of communication and against Soviet airfields. Within hours, Ju 87s of StG 77 had knocked out the Soviet 44th Army's critical communications and mortally wounded the 51st Army's commander. The airfields were destroyed and 57 of the 401 Soviet aircraft in the area were shot down in 2,100 German sorties. With the army's Headquarters knocked out, the Soviets could not organise a counter offensive and the 44th Army collapsed into a retreat when Manstein launched the ground attack. Manstein had five infantry divisions, the 22nd Panzer Division, and two and a half Romanian divisions against 19 Soviet divisions and four armoured brigades at Kerch. The 902nd Assault Boat Command of the 436th Regiment, 132nd German Infantry Division, landed behind the Soviet lines and helped unbuckle the Soviet second lines. The Soviet Black Sea Fleet failed to stop the German seaborne attack. The German artillery bombardment, which included four Nebelwerfer rocket batteries, lasted only 10 minutes, and within 210 minutes of the assault being launched, the second defensive line of the 44th Army was broken.

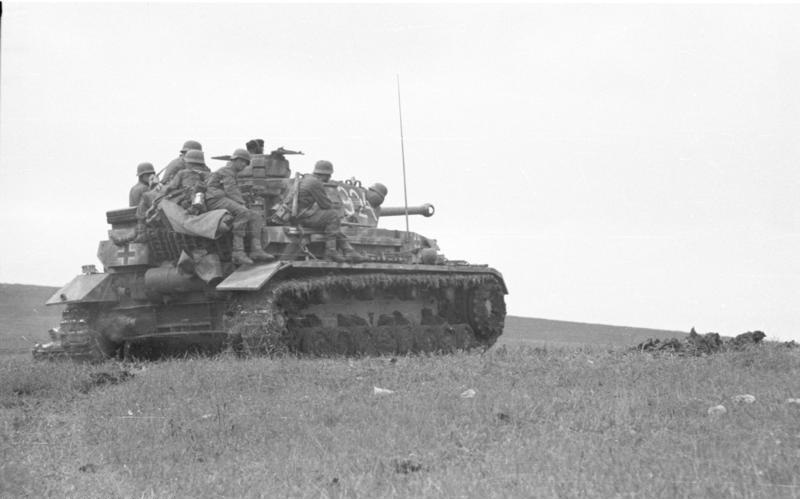
German Panzer IV tank and infantry in battle on the Kerch Peninsula in May 1942.

Stukas, Henschel Hs 129s, Ju 88s and He 111s raked the Soviet positions, paving a smooth road for the German ground forces. Soviet field fortifications were neutralized by Fliegerkorps VIII's close air support and air interdiction capabilities. The 44th Army's 157th and 404th Rifle Divisions were mauled and paralyzed in their movements by the Stukas and Hs 129s. In one incident, 24 counterattacking Soviet tanks were destroyed on sight by StuG IIIs for the loss of only one German assault gun. The 56th Tank Brigade and 126th Separate Tank Battalion launched a counterattack with 98 tanks, including seven KV-1 against the 28th Light Infantry Division. Stukas and Hs 129 Bs showed up and destroyed the attacking Soviet tanks. An estimated 48 Soviet tanks were knocked out, including all seven KV-1. On the first day, XXX Corps, attacking with the 28th, 50th and 132nd Divisions broke through in the south. At a cost of 104 killed and 284 wounded, they captured 4,514 Soviet soldiers. The German engineers partially bridged the anti-tank obstacles on 8 May to prepare the way for the 22nd Panzer Division. Kozlov did not appreciate the significance of the German breakthrough and failed to release reserves for a counter-attack.

On 9 May, the German engineers finished breaching the anti-tank ditch and Manstein committed the 22nd Panzer Division, which swung north and trapped the 51st Army against the Sea of Azov on mid-day 10 May. Confused Soviet counterattacks near Arma-Eli were blasted apart by German close air support and infantry-armor teams. The remaining combat-capable Soviet armor was eliminated by German airpower on 9 May and 25 Soviet aircraft were shot down by German Bf 109 fighters. Richthofen's air units flew 1,700 sorties on 9 May and claimed 52 Soviet aircraft shot down for the loss of 2 of their own. A rainstorm gave the Soviets a brief respite on the evening of 9 May, but when it cleared the next morning, Fliegerkorps VIII destroyed the remaining isolated Soviet tanks, including 11 KV-1.

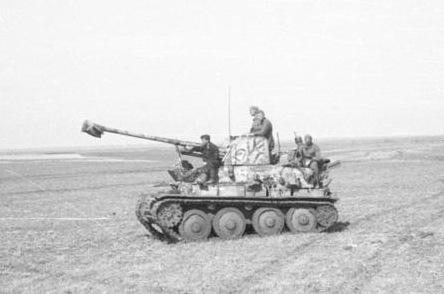
Marder III tank destroyer mounting a captured 76.2mm Russian anti tank gun, deploying for an attack on the Kerch Peninsula in May 1942

Soviet morale and organisation collapsed, and a stampede to the rear areas began. Once this happened, the eight divisions of the 51st Army surrendered on 11 May, releasing XXX Corps to pursue the fragments of retreating Soviet forces to Marfovka, barely 12 kilometers from Kerch. The motorized ad-hoc Groddeck brigade, supported by the Schlachtgeschwader 1 wing, reached the Marfovka airfield in the afternoon and destroyed 35 fighters on the ground. Fliegerkorps VIII's air supremacy peaked on 12 May, when it conducted 1,500 sorties without significant Soviet opposition and was free to bomb the fleeing Soviet columns, resistance nests and Kerch harbour. Richthofen burned Kerch to the ground by dropping 1,780 bombs on it on 12 May. That day, Richthofen was ordered to send the bulk of his combat units to support the German 6th Army at the Second Battle of Kharkov. The number of flown missions was reduced accordingly; from 1,500 to 2,000 sorties per day prior to the redeployment to between 300 and 800 to the end of the Kerch operation. Richthofen described his bombing operations during Trappenjagd as 'concentrated air support, the likes of which has never existed'.

The speed of the advance was rapid. The 132nd Infantry Division overran several airfields, capturing 30 Soviet aircraft on the ground. On 10 May, Fliegerkorps VIII launched KG 55's He 111s against the Soviet forces. The large and slow He 111s made easy targets for ground fire, and eight were lost, but the anti-personnel bombs (SD-2) were devastating to Soviet infantry. German bombers also attacked shipping evacuating personnel from Kerch. Three transports with 900 wounded aboard were sunk, along with a gunboat, six patrol boats and other small craft. The 1,048-ton Chernomorets was sunk the same day. By this time, the air battle was won by the Luftwaffe. Despite the withdrawal of a number of Geschwader to support the 6th Army at the Second Battle of Kharkov, the Luftwaffe had destroyed Soviet aerial opposition and enabled the German Army to make deep penetrations, capturing 29,000 Soviet men, 220 guns and around 170 tanks. Kerch fell on 15 May. The Luftwaffe assisted the final defeat of Soviet ground forces on 20 May, when the last pocket of Soviet resistance south of Kerch was destroyed.

== Aftermath ==
Manstein destroyed three Soviet armies, wiping out nine Soviet divisions and reduced nine more to ineffective remnants. Although forced to return several Luftwaffe units and the 22nd Panzer Division for Case Blue, he could now concentrate his forces for an attack on Sevastopol.

John Erickson wrote that in May 1942 at Kerch Lev Mekhlis "threw away twenty-one divisions of three armies (47th, 51st and 44th) in a nightmare of confusion and mismanagement".

=== Analysis ===
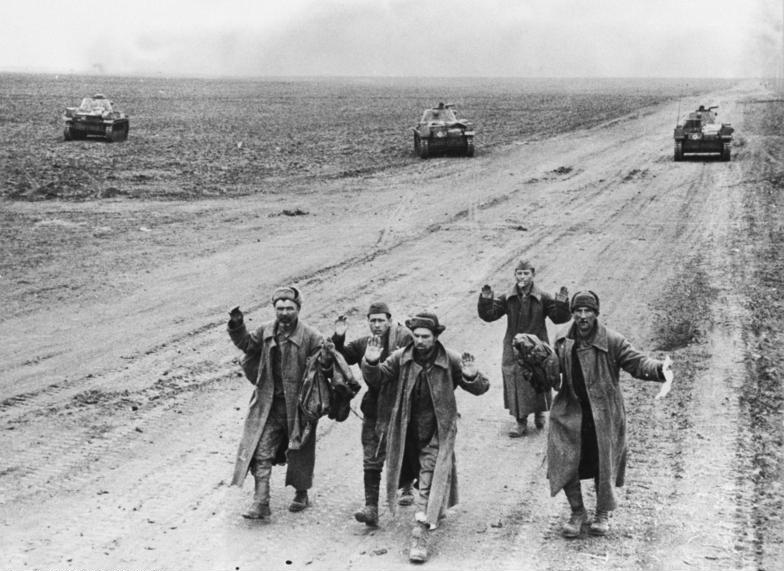
Five Soviet soldiers march to captivity on the Kerch Peninsula in May 1942. Three German tanks are visible in the background.

Manstein executed a successful combined-arms offensive, concentrating armored mobility as well as artillery and aerial firepower to annihilate a Soviet grouping twice his strength. The Soviets failed to conduct a defense-in-depth, allowing the Germans to puncture their lines on the first day of the offensive and defeat their counterattacks. Three Soviet armies either surrendered within four days, or were heavily mauled by Richthofen's VIII. Fliegerkorps while retreating.

=== Casualties ===
In the 11 days of Operation Bustard Hunt, Fliegerkorps VIII lost 37 aircraft. At the same time, the Air Force of the Crimean Front lost 417 aircraft. Between 37,000 and 116,045 Soviet soldiers were evacuated by sea, of which 20 percent were wounded. An estimated 162,282 were left behind, killed or captured. 28,000 Soviet troops were killed and 147,000–170,000 taken prisoner, but according to Swedish historian Christer Bergström the prisoners included a large number of civilians. German casualties amounted to only 7,588 men in XXX and XLII Corps, including 1,703 killed or missing. They expended 6230 tons of ammunition, losing nine artillery pieces, three assault guns and 8–12 tanks.

Several groups of Soviet survivors refused to surrender and fought on for many months, hiding in the catacombs of the Adzhimushkay quarries. Many of these soldiers were occupying the caves along with many civilians, who had fled the city of Kerch. The Germans also deployed poison gas against the survivors, thus furthering the casualties.

== Bibliography ==
- Bellamy, Chris (2007). Absolute War: Soviet Russia in the Second World War. Alfred A. Knopf. ISBN 978-0-375-41086-4.
- Brookes, Andrew (2003). Air War Over Russia. Shepperton, United Kingdom: Ian Allan Publishing. ISBN 978-0-7110-2890-6.
- Bergström, Christer (2007). Stalingrad – The Air Battle: 1942 through January 1943. Hinckley: Midland Publishing. ISBN 978-1-85780-276-4.
- Erickson, John (1975). The Road to Stalingrad: Stalin's War With Germany. New Haven, Connecticut: Yale University Press. ISBN 978-0-300-07812-1.
- Erickson, John (2003) [1975]. The Road to Stalingrad: Stalin's War with Germany Volume One. London: Cassell. ISBN 0-304-36541-6.
- Forczyk, Robert (2008). Sevastopol 1942: Von Manstein's Triumph. Oxford: Osprey. ISBN 978-1-84603-221-9.
- Forczyk, Robert (2014). Where the Iron Crosses Grow: The Crimea 1941–44. Oxford: Osprey. ISBN 978-1-4728-1678-8.
- Glantz, David M.; House, Jonathan (1995). When Titans Clashed: How the Red Army Stopped Hitler. Lawrence, Kansas: Kansas University Press. ISBN 978-0-7006-0717-4.
- Glantz, David M. (March 2001). "Forgotten Battles of the German-Soviet War (1941-45), Part 6: The Winter Campaign (5 December 1941 – April 1942): The Crimean Counteroffensive and Reflections". Journal of Slavic Military Studies. 14 (1): 121–170. doi:10.1080/13518040108430472. S2CID 143776440.
- Hayward, J. (1998). Stopped at Stalingrad: The Luftwaffe and Hitler's Defeat in the East, 1942–1943. Lawrence, Kansas: University Press of Kansas. ISBN 978-0-7006-1146-1.
- Hooton, E.R. (2016). War over the Steppes: The air campaigns on the Eastern Front 1941–45. Oxford: Osprey. ISBN 978-1-47281562-0.
- Isaev, Alexei; et al. (2016). Битва за Крым 1941–1944 гг [Battle for Crimea 1941–1944] (in Russian) (EPUB ed.). Moscow: Yauza/Eksmo. ISBN 978-5-699-92485-1.
- Krivosheev, Grigoriy (1997). Soviet Casualties and Combat Losses in the Twentieth Century. London: Greenhill Books. ISBN 978-1-85367-280-4.
- Melvin, Mungo (2010). Manstein: Hitler's Greatest General. London: Weidenfeld & Nicolson. ISBN 978-0-297-84561-4.
- Shneer, David (2020). Grief: The Biography of a Holocaust Photograph. Oxford University Press. ISBN 978-0-19-092381-5.

=== Further reading ===
- Hayward, Joel S. A. (Summer 1997). "The German Use of Air Power at Kharkov, May 1942" (PDF). Air Power History. 44 (2). Archived from the original (PDF) on 2015-07-03.
- Hayward, Joel S. A. (June 1997). "Von Richthofen's 'Giant fire-magic': The Luftwaffe's Contribution to the Battle of Kerch, 1942". The Journal of Slavic Military Studies. 10 (2): 97–124. doi:10.1080/13518049708430293.
- Hooton, E.R. Eagle in Flames: The Fall of the Luftwaffe. Arms & Armour Press. 1997. ISBN 1-86019-995-X
