= Caucasus Front (Soviet Union) =

- Active: 30 December 1941 – 28 January 1942
- Country: Soviet Union
- Branch: Red Army
- Type: Army Group Command
- Size: Several Armies
- Engagements: World War II; Kerch–Feodosiya Landing Operation

Commanders
- Notable commanders: Dmitry Kozlov

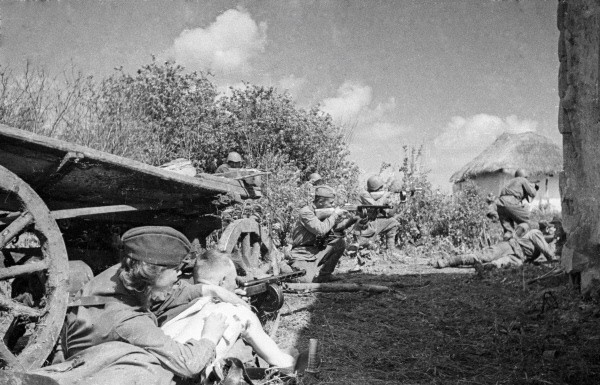
Soviet troops fight for a village on the Caucasian front.

The Caucasus Front was a front of the Red Army during the Second World War.

== History ==
The Caucasus Front was created on 30 December 1941 from Transcaucasus Front. The commander of the latter, Lieutenant General Dmitry Kozlov, continued in command of the front. Its chief of staff was Major General Fyodor Tolbukhin.

It comprised the

- 44th Army (Aleksei Pervushin and Ivan Dashichev)
- 45th Army (Vasily Novikov
- 46th Army (Alexander Khadeyev)
- 47th Army (Konstantin Baranov)
- 51st Army (Vladimir Lvov)

Were operationally subordinated to the front :

- Sevastopol Defensive Region (under siege)
- the Black Sea Fleet
- the Azov Flotilla

The troops of the front completed the Kerch–Feodosiya Landing Operation, began on 25 December by the Transcaucasus Front and Black Sea Fleet, gaining a bridgehead in Crimea and pushing back the defending German forces.

On 28 January 1942, the front was split, with the 44th, 47th, and 51st Armies becoming part of the new Crimean Front, while the 45th and 46th Armies joined the reestablished Transcaucasus Military District.
