= Defense of the Adzhimushkay quarry =

1942 battle in Crimea during WW2

- Part of the Eastern Front of World War II
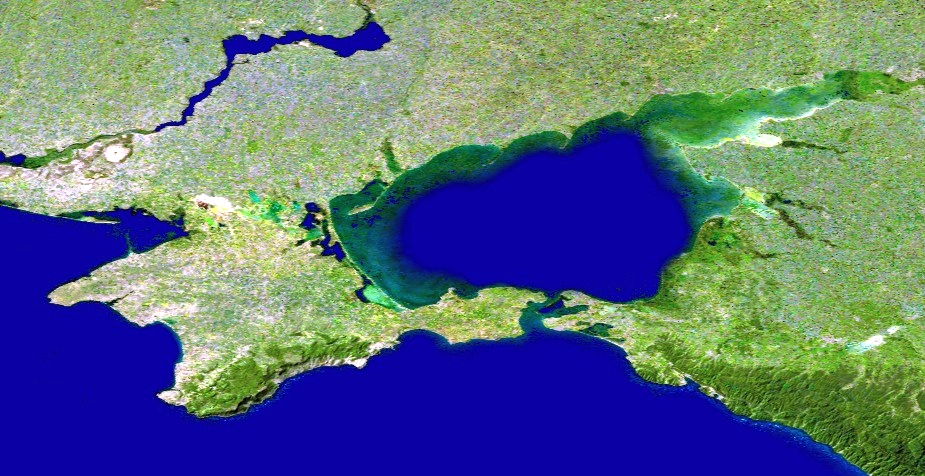
- Crimea and Sea of Azov
Date	May 16 – October 30, 1942
Location	Adzhimushkay (now within Kerch), Crimea, USSR 45.3812°N 36.5235°E
Result	German victory

Belligerents
Germany	Soviet Union

Strength
Several regiments	≈13 000

Casualties and losses
Unknown	≈12 900+ (only 48 people survived)

The defense of the Adzhimushkay quarry (Russian: Оборона Аджимушкайских каменоломен) took place during World War II, between May and October 1942, in the Adzhimushkay quarry named after the Adzhimushkay suburb of Kerch during Nazi Germany's occupation of Crimea.

== Background ==
Adzhimushkay was a small mining suburb 5 km from the city of Kerch, where a complex network of catacombs is located. Limestone was extracted there from 1830 by using both the surface quarry and the underground mines. The latter resulted in the network of tunnels (catacombs), known as the Great and Small Adzhimushkay catacombs. They were first used for military purposes by pro-Bolshevik armed groups during the Russian Civil War.

== Events ==
When Kerch was occupied by the Wehrmacht in November 1941, a squad of Soviet partisans already operated in the catacombs. By May 1942, a counteroffensive was staged by the Wehrmacht to expel the Red Army from the Kerch Peninsula and the city of Sevastopol. The Red Army was overrun, had to evacuate the bridgehead and sustained heavy casualties. By May 19, 1942, regular fighting in the area had ended, and to ensure the evacuation of the Soviet troops across the Strait of Kerch, a defense group was left in Adzhimushkay and led by Colonel Pavel Yagunov.

The group absorbed retreating soldiers, along with numerous civilians fleeing the city, and eventually grew to several thousand. When it became obvious that the bridgehead over the strait could not be held, the Adzhimushkay group found refuge in the catacombs. It is estimated that more than 10,000 fled to the Great Adzhimushkay catacombs system, and 3,000 to the Small Adzhimushkay catacombs system. The larger garrison was led by Yagunov, Parakhin and Burmin and the smaller one by Yermakov, Povazhny and Karpekin.

The catacombs were ill-suited for defense, as no supplies had been prepared there, and all wells were located outside. Any supply of water had to be taken by force since a sortie was needed to reach a well. The Soviet group attempted several counterattacks, including one resulting in the defeat of the Wehrmacht garrison in Adzhimushkay on the night of 8 and 9 July 1942. Colonel Yagunov was killed in that assault.

Most Soviet guerrillas died, as the group ran out of ammunition, food and water and resorted to extreme techniques of survival such as preparing meat of the dead livestock earlier killed in the mine entrances and gathering water condensed on the mine ceilings. The defenders also attempted to dig their own wells in the catacombs as deep as 14 m to reach the phreatic water layer.

The German forces surrounded the quarries with barbed wire fencing, blocked the entrances and exits and bombed and shelled them. General Hermann Ochsner, the chief of the chemical forces, proposed the use of a non-lethal irritant gas to smoke the partisans out of such hiding places, but he was denied permission to carry out the attack although survivors' testimonies claimed otherwise.

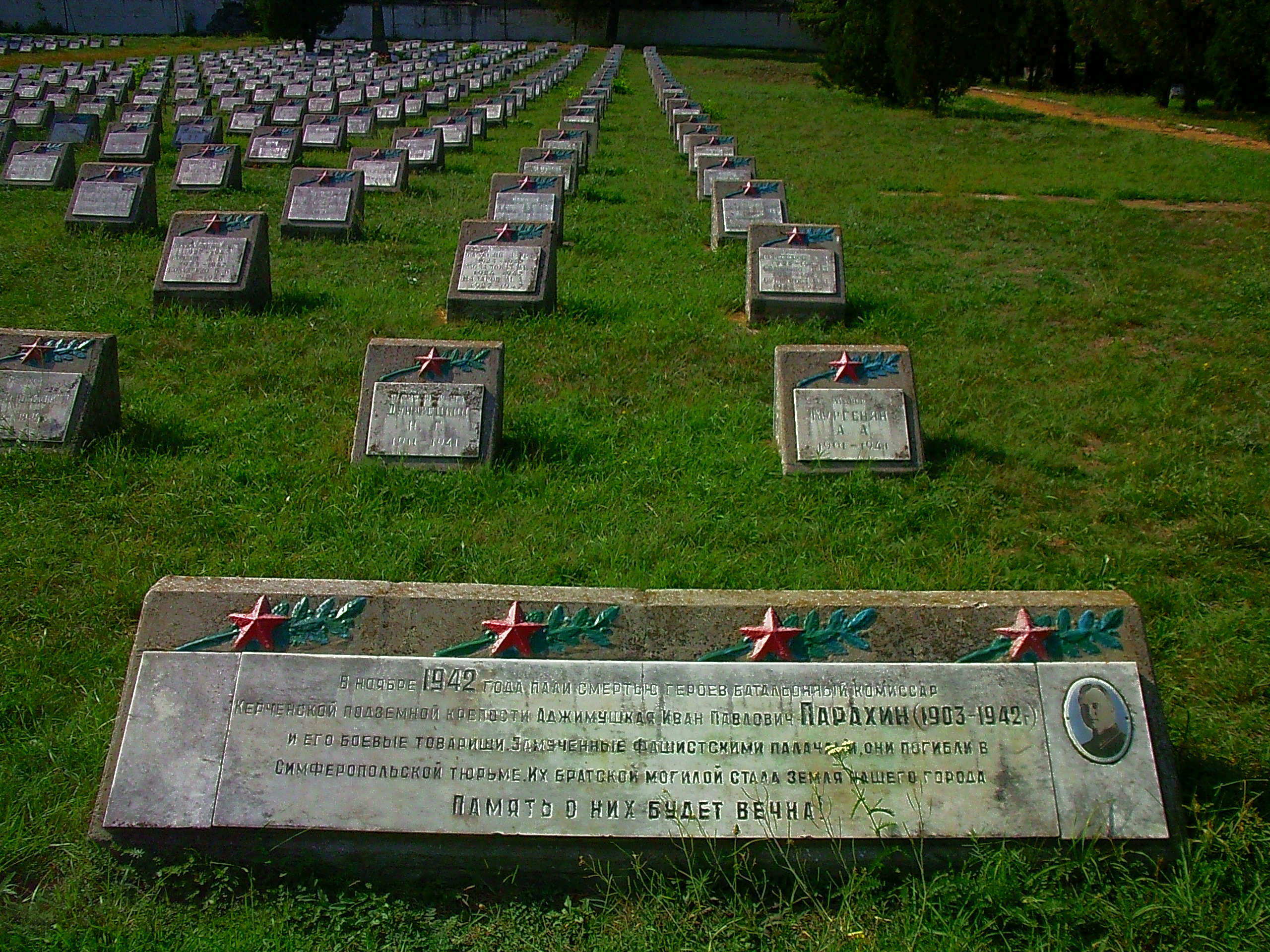
The plaque at the Simferopol military cemetery in the foreground states that Ivan Parakhin and some other Soviet defenders of Adzhimushkay were captured and executed by Nazis in the Simferopol prison.

On October 30, 1942, German forces entered the catacombs and captured the remaining defenders. The estimates of the number of guerrilla fighters surviving the 170-day siege and final clash and their subsequent treatment by Nazis varied from 48 to 300 of the initial 13,000 of the Soviet group.

== Remembrance ==
Several books and songs were written to commemorate the defense. A museum was established in the quarry in 1966 and the memorial complex was established in 1982.

== Sources ==
- В. Кондратьев. По поводу дневников, найденных в Аджимушкайских каменоломнях // «Военно-исторический журнал», № 1, 1965.
- С. С. Смирнов. Подземная крепость // Первая шеренга. М., Политиздат, 1965. с. 103—149.
- Обагренные кровью. Последнее слово павших героев. / сб., сост. П. Е. Гармаш, Н. Д. Луговой. Симферополь, изд-во "Крым", 1968. стр.180-206
- В. Кондратьев. Герои Аджимушкая. — М.: Молодая гвардия, 1975.
- А. Рябикин. Аджимушкай // журнал «Вокруг света», № 11 (2566), ноябрь 1972.
- Надписи советских воинов на стенах и записи в дневниках, найденных в Аджимушкайских каменоломнях. Май - июль 1942 г. // Говорят погибшие герои: предсмертные письма советских борцов против немецко-фашистских захватчиков (1941 - 1945 гг.) / сост. В. А. Кондратьев, З. Н. Политов. 6-е изд., испр. и доп. М., Политиздат, 1979. стр.83-91
- В катакомбах Аджимушкая: Документы. Воспоминания. Статьи. Симферополь, 1982.
- В. В. Абрамов. Героическая оборона аджимушкайских каменоломен. М., «Знание», 1983 — 64 с.
- Н. А. Ефремов. Солдаты подземелья. Ташкент, 1983.
- Князев Г. Н., Проценко И. С. Доблесть бессмертна: О подвиге защитников Аджимушкая. М., 1987—174 с.
- Щербак С. М. Легендарный Аджимушкай. Симферополь, «Таврия», 1989. — 93 с.
- Всеволод Абрамов. Керченская катастрофа 1942. — М.: Эксмо, 2006. — ISBN 5-699-15686-0.

=== Fiction ===
- Aleksei Kapler, Two of Twenty Million «Двое из двадцати миллионов»,
- Пирогов Андрей Иоанникиевич «Крепость солдатских сердец», 1974 год
- Камбулов (Колибуков) Николай Иванович: повести «Свет в катакомбах», «Подземный гарнизон», «Тринадцать осколков», «Аджимушкайская тетрадь», роман «Разводящий ещё не пришел».
- Смирнов С. С. «Подземная крепость». Из сборника «Рассказы о неизвестных героях» — М.: Молодая гвардия, 1964 г.
- Николай Арсеньевич Ефремов. "Солдаты подземелья". Издательство "Крым", Симферополь, 1970 г. - воспоминания непосредственного участника обороны.
- Lev Kassil. "Улица младшего сына"

The 1986 drama film Descended from the Heaven (Russian: Сошедшие с небес) was based on the novel by Aleksei Kapler. It is the story of an ordinary Soviet couple that struggles with the difficulties of post-World War II life. In the film's finale it is revealed that they perished in the Adzhimushkay Quarry, and the film is in fact a "what if" story.
