= Crimean Front =

- Active: 28 January 1942 – 19 May 1942
- Country: Soviet Union
- Branch: Red Army
- Type: Army Group Command
- Size: Several Armies
- Engagements: World War II; Siege of Sevastopol (1941–1942); Battle of the Kerch Peninsula

Commanders
- Notable commanders: Dmitry Kozlov

The Crimean Front (Ukrainian: Кри́мський фронт, Krýms’kyj front) was one of the Red Army fronts of World War II, which existed from January–May 1942.

== Composition ==
It was commanded throughout its existence by Dmitr Timofeyevich Kozlov, and was made up of

- 44th Soviet Army (Stepan Chernyak),
- 47th Soviet Army (Konstantin Kolganov),
- 51st Soviet Army (Vladimir Lvov).

It also had operational control over

- the North Caucasus Military District,
- the Black Sea Fleet,
- the Sevastopol Defence Region (still under siege),
- the Azov Flotilla,
- the Kerch Naval Base.

== Actions ==
It was formed on 28 January 1942 by splitting the Caucasian front and included the armies then in the Kerch and Taman peninsulas and the region of Krasnodar, along with operational control over other forces.

It was tasked with assisting the troops of Sevastopol Defence Area, striking at Karasubazar and threatening the rear of the Axis forces blockading Sevastopol. Its troops went on the offensive three times from February 27 to April 13, 1942, but made no significant progress, and after minor gains they were forced onto the defensive. On 21 April 1942, the troops in the North Caucasus were added to it.

On 8 May 1942, the Germans launched an offensive on the Kerch Peninsula and recaptured it on 16 May, forcing the Soviet troops of the Crimean Front to be evacuated to the Taman Peninsula. Some troops were unable to evacuate and fought the Germans at Adzhimushkay until the end of October of the same year, with no significant stocks of food, water, medicine, arms, or ammunition.

The Red Army lost over 300,000 men in the Kerch landings, and a large amount of its heavy weaponry. The landings' failure was also a major factor in the Soviet loss of Sevastopol in July 1942, and helped make possible the German summer offensive into the Caucasus.

On 19 May 1942, the Crimean Front was disbanded, and its troops given to the command of the North Caucasian Front.
