= Odessa Offensive Soviet order of battle =

The following Soviet units fought in the Odessa Offensive between 26 March and 30 April 1944.

For the offensive, the 3rd Ukrainian Front included 57 rifle and three cavalry divisions, a tank corps and a mechanized corps. According to a postwar history, these totaled 470,000 men, 12,678 guns and mortars, 435 tanks and self-propelled guns. The front was supported by the 17th Air Army with 436 combat aircraft. The 3rd Ukrainian Front's report on the operation, drawn up in August 1944, provides figures for the operational strength of the front on 28 March: 243,074 men, 42,512 submachine guns, 4,824 machine guns, and 344 tanks and self-propelled guns (only counting those in the 23rd Tank Corps and Cavalry-Mechanized Group), 2,112 mortars, 1,616 field guns, and 781 anti-aircraft guns.

== Abbreviations used ==
=== Military rank ===
- LTG = Lieutenant general (General-leytenant)
- LTGAv = Lieutenant General of Aviation
- LTGTF = Lieutenant General of Tank Forces
- MG = Major general (General-mayor)
- MGAv = Major General of Aviation
- MGTF = Major General of Tank Forces
- COL = Colonel (Polkovnik)
- LTC = Lieutenant Colonel (Podpolkovnik)
- MAJ = Major (Mayor)

=== Other ===
- k = Killed
- w = Wounded

== Command ==
The Soviet forces involved in the offensive were part of the 3rd Ukrainian Front, commanded by Army General Rodion Malinovsky. Lieutenant General Fyodor Korzhenevich served as front chief of staff and Lieutenant General Aleksey Zheltov as front commissar.

== Ground forces ==
=== 57th Army ===
Lieutenant General Nikolay Gagen

Units	Component units	Strength	Losses
9th Rifle Corps: MG Ivan Rosly (transferred from 28th Army)	118th Rifle Division: COL Fyodor Dobrovolsky		
9th Rifle Corps: MG Ivan Rosly (transferred from 28th Army)	230th Rifle Division: COL Iosif Kazakov		
9th Rifle Corps: MG Ivan Rosly (transferred from 28th Army)	301st Rifle Division: COL Vladimir Antonov		
64th Rifle Corps: MG Mikhail Anashkin	73rd Guards Rifle Division: MG Semyon Kozak		
64th Rifle Corps: MG Mikhail Anashkin	19th Rifle Division: MG Pavel Lazarev		
64th Rifle Corps: MG Mikhail Anashkin	52nd Rifle Division: COL Leonid Milyayev		
68th Rifle Corps: MG Nikolay Shkodunovich	93rd Rifle Division: MG Apollon Kruze		
68th Rifle Corps: MG Nikolay Shkodunovich	113th Rifle Division: COL Pyotr Dmitriyev		
68th Rifle Corps: MG Nikolay Shkodunovich	223rd Rifle Division: COL Pyotr Tatarchevsky		
Reserves and separate units	96th Separate Tank Brigade: COL Valentin Kulibabenko		
Reserves and separate units	93rd Separate Antitank Rifle Battalion		

=== 37th Army ===
Lieutenant General Mikhail Sharokhin

Units	Component units	Strength	Losses
6th Guards Rifle Corps: MG Grigory Kotov	20th Guards Rifle Division: MG Nikolay Dreyer		
6th Guards Rifle Corps: MG Grigory Kotov	195th Rifle Division: COL Ivan Kholodov		
57th Rifle Corps: MG Fyodor Ostashenko	58th Guards Rifle Division: COL Vladimir Rusakov, succeeded by COL Vasily Katsurin 15 April		
57th Rifle Corps: MG Fyodor Ostashenko	92nd Guards Rifle Division: COL Mitrofan Matveyev		
57th Rifle Corps: MG Fyodor Ostashenko	228th Rifle Division: COL Pavel Kulikov, succeeded by COL Ivan Yesin 28 March		
82nd Rifle Corps: MG Pavel Kuznetsov	10th Guards Airborne Division: MG Mikhail Mikeladze, succeeded by COL Andrey Petrushin 9 April		
82nd Rifle Corps: MG Pavel Kuznetsov	28th Guards Rifle Division: MG Georgy Chumayev		
82nd Rifle Corps: MG Pavel Kuznetsov	188th Rifle Division: COL Vasily Danilenko		
Reserves and separate units	15th Guards Rifle Division: MG Pyotr Chirkov		
Reserves and separate units	22nd Separate Armored Train Battalion		

=== 46th Army ===
Lieutenant General Vasily Glagolev

The 31st Guards Rifle Corps was in the army's second echelon at the beginning of the offensive, engaging in battle from 6 April to 24 April.

Units	Component units	Strength	Losses
31st Guards Rifle Corps: MG Arkhip Ruchkin	4th Guards Rifle Division: COL Kuzma Parfyonov	2,921 officers and men, 859 horses (6 April)	
31st Guards Rifle Corps: MG Arkhip Ruchkin	34th Guards Rifle Division: MG Filipp Braylyan	3,949 officers and men, 830 horses (6 April)	12 killed, 37 wounded (with 34th RC)
31st Guards Rifle Corps: MG Arkhip Ruchkin	40th Guards Rifle Division: MG Grigory Panchenko	3,009 officers and men, 683 horses (6 April)	
32nd Rifle Corps: MG Dmitry Zherebin	60th Guards Rifle Division: MG Vasily Sokolov		
32nd Rifle Corps: MG Dmitry Zherebin	259th Rifle Division: MG Aleksey Vlasenko		
32nd Rifle Corps: MG Dmitry Zherebin	266th Rifle Division: COL Savva Fomichenko		
34th Rifle Corps: MG Ivan Kosobutsky	236th Rifle Division: MG Ivan Fesin		202 killed, 1,204 wounded (to 15 April)
34th Rifle Corps: MG Ivan Kosobutsky	394th Rifle Division: MG Aleksandr Lisitsyn		338 killed, 1,371 wounded (to 15 April)
Reserves and separate units	353rd Rifle Division: MG Fyodor Kolchuk		81 killed, 209 wounded (with 34th RC)

=== 8th Guards Army ===
Colonel General Vasily Chuikov

Units	Component units	Strength	Losses
4th Guards Rifle Corps: LTG Vasily Glazunov	35th Guards Rifle Division: MG Ivan Kulagin		
4th Guards Rifle Corps: LTG Vasily Glazunov	47th Guards Rifle Division: MG Sergey Bobruk, COL Vasily Shugayev from 26 March		
4th Guards Rifle Corps: LTG Vasily Glazunov	57th Guards Rifle Division: MG Afanasy Shemenkov		
28th Guards Rifle Corps: MG Stepan Morozov	39th Guards Rifle Division: LTC Viktor Shtrigol		
28th Guards Rifle Corps: MG Stepan Morozov	79th Guards Rifle Division: MG Leonid Vagin		
28th Guards Rifle Corps: MG Stepan Morozov	88th Guards Rifle Division: MG Boris Pankov, COL Yefim Marchenko from 6 April		
29th Guards Rifle Corps: MG Ivan Kravtsov, LTG Sergey Bobruk from 28 March, LTG Yakov Fokanov from 13 April	27th Guards Rifle Division: MG Gleb Baklanov		
29th Guards Rifle Corps: MG Ivan Kravtsov, LTG Sergey Bobruk from 28 March, LTG Yakov Fokanov from 13 April	74th Guards Rifle Division: COL Dmitry Bakanov		
29th Guards Rifle Corps: MG Ivan Kravtsov, LTG Sergey Bobruk from 28 March, LTG Yakov Fokanov from 13 April	82nd Guards Rifle Division: MG Ivan Makarenko, LTC Matvey Karnaukhov from 2 April		
Reserves and separate units	152nd Rifle Division: COL Andrian Kuzin		
Reserves and separate units	5th Guards Separate Tank Regiment		

=== 6th Army ===
Lieutenant General Ivan Shlyomin

Units	Component units	Strength	Losses
34th Guards Rifle Corps: MG Nikolay Makovchuk	59th Guards Rifle Division: MG Georgy Karamyshev		
34th Guards Rifle Corps: MG Nikolay Makovchuk	61st Guards Rifle Division: MG Leonid Lozanovich		
34th Guards Rifle Corps: MG Nikolay Makovchuk	243rd Rifle Division: COL Makariy Togolev		
66th Rifle Corps: MG Dmitry Kupryanov	203rd Rifle Division: MG Gavriil Zdanovich		
66th Rifle Corps: MG Dmitry Kupryanov	244th Rifle Division: MG Georgy Afanasyev		
66th Rifle Corps: MG Dmitry Kupryanov	333rd Rifle Division: MG Anisim Golosko		

=== 5th Shock Army ===
Colonel General Vyacheslav Tsvetayev

Units	Component units	Strength	Losses
10th Guards Rifle Corps: MG Ivan Rubanyuk	86th Guards Rifle Division: COL Vasily Pavlovich Sokolovsky	3,998 personnel (1 April), 3,735 personnel (10 April)	
10th Guards Rifle Corps: MG Ivan Rubanyuk	109th Guards Rifle Division: COL Ilya Baldynov	3,076 personnel (1 April), 2,899 personnel (10 April)	
10th Guards Rifle Corps: MG Ivan Rubanyuk	320th Rifle Division: MG Ilya Shvygin	3,537 personnel (1 April), 3,382 personnel (10 April)	
37th Rifle Corps: MG Sergey Gorokhov	49th Guards Rifle Division: COL Vasily Margelov	3,961 personnel (1 April), 3,779 personnel (10 April)	
37th Rifle Corps: MG Sergey Gorokhov	108th Guards Rifle Division: COL Sergey Dunayev	3,047 personnel (27 March), 2,994 personnel (1 April), 2,932 personnel (10 April)	
37th Rifle Corps: MG Sergey Gorokhov	248th Rifle Division: COL Nikolay Galay	3,382 personnel (27 March), 3,304 personnel (1 April), 3,185 personnel (10 April)	
37th Rifle Corps: MG Sergey Gorokhov	416th Rifle Division: MG Dmitry Syzranov	3,604 personnel (27 March), 3,462 personnel (1 April), 3,828 personnel (10 April)	
Reserves and separate units	295th Rifle Division: COL Aleksandr Dorofeyev	4,474 personnel (1 April), 4,202 personnel (10 April)	
Reserves and separate units	1st Guards Fortified Region: COL Sergey Nikitin	2,396 personnel (1 April), 2,408 personnel (10 April)	

=== Cavalry-Mechanized Group ===
Lieutenant General Issa Pliyev

Units	Component units	Strength	Losses
4th Guards Mechanized Corps: LTGTF Trofim Tanaschishin (killed 31 March 1944), MGTF Vladimir Zhdanov	13th Guards Mechanized Brigade: LTC Pyotr Arshinov, COL Yakov Trotsenko from 17 April		
4th Guards Mechanized Corps: LTGTF Trofim Tanaschishin (killed 31 March 1944), MGTF Vladimir Zhdanov	14th Guards Mechanized Brigade: COL Nikodim Nikitin		
4th Guards Mechanized Corps: LTGTF Trofim Tanaschishin (killed 31 March 1944), MGTF Vladimir Zhdanov	15th Guards Mechanized Brigade: LTC Mikhail Andrianov		
4th Guards Mechanized Corps: LTGTF Trofim Tanaschishin (killed 31 March 1944), MGTF Vladimir Zhdanov	36th Guards Tank Brigade: COL Pyotr Zhukov		
4th Guards Mechanized Corps: LTGTF Trofim Tanaschishin (killed 31 March 1944), MGTF Vladimir Zhdanov	37th Guards Tank Regiment (organic to 15th Guards Mechanized Brigade)		
4th Guards Mechanized Corps: LTGTF Trofim Tanaschishin (killed 31 March 1944), MGTF Vladimir Zhdanov	38th Guards Tank Regiment (organic to 13th Guards Mechanized Brigade)		
4th Guards Mechanized Corps: LTGTF Trofim Tanaschishin (killed 31 March 1944), MGTF Vladimir Zhdanov	39th Guards Tank Regiment (organic to 15th Guards Mechanized Brigade)		
4th Guards Cavalry Corps: LTG Issa Pliyev	9th Guards Cavalry Division: MG Ivan Tutarinov		Personnel: 135 killed, 367 wounded; Horses: 980 killed, 6 wounded
4th Guards Cavalry Corps: LTG Issa Pliyev	10th Guards Cavalry Division: COL Nikolay Gadalin, COL Sergey Shevchuk from 6 April (captured 11 April), COL Mikhail Poprikaylo from 12 April		Personnel: 203 killed, 562 wounded; Horses: 1,856 killed, 60 wounded
4th Guards Cavalry Corps: LTG Issa Pliyev	30th Cavalry Division: MG Vasily Golovskoy		Personnel: 227 killed, 499 wounded; Horses: 1,512 killed, 174 wounded
4th Guards Cavalry Corps: LTG Issa Pliyev	128th Separate Tank Regiment (attached to the 10th Guards Cavalry Division): LTC Mikhail Sazonov	11 х М4А2 Sherman, 10 x Valentine Mk III (30 March)	
4th Guards Cavalry Corps: LTG Issa Pliyev	134th Separate Tank Regiment (attached to the 30th Cavalry Division): COL Nikolay Ognev	9 x M4A2 Sherman, 9 x Valentine Mk III (30 March)	
4th Guards Cavalry Corps: LTG Issa Pliyev	151st Separate Tank Regiment (attached to 9th Guards Cavalry Division): MAJ Nikolay Savin (killed 10 April), MAJ Pavel Bakin	9 x M4A2 Sherman, 10 x Valentine Mk III, (30 March)	Equipment: 3 x M4A2, 2 x Mk III knocked out; Personnel: 5 killed, 4 wounded

=== Front reserves ===
==== Corps ====
Units	Component units	Strength	Losses
2nd Guards Mechanized Corps: LTGTF Karp Sviridov	4th Guards Mechanized Brigade: COL Mikhail Lyashchenko		
2nd Guards Mechanized Corps: LTGTF Karp Sviridov	5th Guards Mechanized Brigade: COL Fyodor Safronov		
2nd Guards Mechanized Corps: LTGTF Karp Sviridov	6th Guards Mechanized Brigade: COL Aleksandr Roslov		
2nd Guards Mechanized Corps: LTGTF Karp Sviridov	37th Guards Tank Brigade: LTC Ivan Kharin		
2nd Guards Mechanized Corps: LTGTF Karp Sviridov	23rd Guards Tank Regiment		
2nd Guards Mechanized Corps: LTGTF Karp Sviridov	24th Guards Tank Regiment		
2nd Guards Mechanized Corps: LTGTF Karp Sviridov	25th Guards Tank Regiment		
23rd Tank Corps: MGTF Aleksey Akhmanov	3rd Tank Brigade: COL Ivan Devyatko		
23rd Tank Corps: MGTF Aleksey Akhmanov	39th Tank Brigade: COL Aleksey Lyskin		
23rd Tank Corps: MGTF Aleksey Akhmanov	135th Tank Brigade: COL Mikhail Beznoshchenko	30 T-34 tanks (29 March)	
23rd Tank Corps: MGTF Aleksey Akhmanov	56th Motor Rifle Brigade: LTC Filipp Shtanko	1,349 men, including 700 active bayonets (29 March)	139 killed, 576 wounded, 36 sick, 6 missing

==== Smaller units ====
Unit	Strength	Losses
10th Separate Automatic Weapons Battalion		
5th Guards Motor Rifle Brigade: LTC Nikolay Zavyalov		
28th Guards Separate Tank Regiment		
35th Separate Tank Regiment		
43rd Separate Tank Regiment		
52nd Separate Tank Regiment		
398th Guards Heavy Self-propelled Artillery Regiment		
864th Self-propelled Artillery Regiment		
1200th Self-propelled Artillery Regiment		
1201st Self-propelled Artillery Regiment		
1202nd Self-propelled Artillery Regiment		
1891st Self-propelled Artillery Regiment		
3rd Guards Motorcycle Regiment		
53rd Motorcycle Regiment		
67th Motorcycle Battalion		
26th Separate Armored Train Battalion		
28th Separate Armored Train Battalion		

== Air forces ==
=== 17th Air Army ===
Colonel General of Aviation Vladimir Sudets

Units	Component units	Strength	Losses
1st Mixed Aviation Corps: MGAv Vladimir Shevchenko	5th Guards Assault Aviation Division: COL Leonid Kolomeytsev		
1st Mixed Aviation Corps: MGAv Vladimir Shevchenko	288th Fighter Aviation Division: COL Boris Smirnov		
9th Mixed Aviation Corps: LTGAv Oleg Tolstikov	305th Assault Aviation Division: COL Nikolay Mikhevichev		
9th Mixed Aviation Corps: LTGAv Oleg Tolstikov	306th Assault Aviation Division: COL Aleksandr Ivanov		
9th Mixed Aviation Corps: LTGAv Oleg Tolstikov	295th Fighter Aviation Division: COL Anatoly Silverstov		
Separate units	244th Bomber Aviation Division: LTC Pavel Nedosekin		
Separate units	262nd Night Bomber Aviation Division: COL Gennady Belitsky		
Separate units	371st Night Bomber Aviation Regiment		
Separate units	39th Reconnaissance Aviation Regiment		
Separate units	96th Corrective-Reconnaissance Aviation Regiment		
Separate units	282nd Separate Signal Aviation Regiment		
Separate units	3rd Medical Aviation Regiment		
Separate units	14th Aviation Regiment, Civil Air Fleet		
