= 236th Rifle Division =

236th Motorized Division (April 20, 1941 – July 26, 1941) 236th Rifle Division (July 26, 1941 – July 1945)
- Active: 1941–1945
- Country: Soviet Union
- Branch: Red Army
- Type: Infantry
- Role: Motorized Infantry
- Size: Division
- Engagements: Crimean campaign Battle of the Kerch Peninsula; Battle of the Caucasus; Battle of the Dniepr; Dnipropetrovsk operation Nikopol–Krivoi Rog offensive Bereznegovatoye–Snigirevka offensive First Jassy–Kishinev offensive Second Jassy–Kishinev offensive Belgrade offensive Budapest offensive Operation Konrad III; Operation Spring Awakening; Vienna offensive
- Decorations: Order of the Red Banner; Order of Suvorov
- Battle honours: Dnipropetrovsk

Commanders
- Notable commanders: Maj. Gen. Vasilii Konstantinovich Moroz; Col. Pyotr Ivanovich Nemertsalov; Col. Gleb Nikolaevich Korchikov; Maj. Gen. Nikita Emelianovich Chuvakov; Maj. Gen. Nikita Fyodorovich Tsepliaev; Maj. Gen. Ivan Ivanovich Fesin; Maj. Gen. Pyotr Ivanovich Kulizhskii

The 236th Rifle Division was formed as an infantry division of the Red Army after a motorized division of that same number was reorganized in the first weeks of the German invasion of the Soviet Union. It was based on the shtat (table of organization and equipment) of July 29, 1941, although it was briefly redesignated as a mountain rifle division prior to making an amphibious landing at Feodosia in late December. This overly ambitious undertaking by Crimean Front's 44th Army led to a disaster when a German counterattack retook the port, destroying much of the division's personnel and equipment. The remnants of the division were forced to evacuate the Crimea in the wake of the German counteroffensive in May.

As it gradually rebuilt in the western Caucasus region the 236th played an important role in the defense of Tuapse during Army Group A's summer offensive. Over the winter it pursued the German 17th Army as it withdrew to the Kuban and took part in the liberation of Krasnodar. It was then moved north to join 46th Army in Southwestern Front (later 3rd Ukrainian Front) and advanced through eastern Ukraine, forcing a crossing of the Dniepr River and helping to liberate Dnepropetrovsk, for which it received a battle honor. Soon after, it was awarded two decorations for its successes in the winter battles in the great bend of the Dniepr. Its combat path was halted for a few months along the Dniestr River, but in August 1944 it began its advance through Bessarabia and into the Balkans, where all three of its rifle regiments received honors for the liberation of Belgrade. After crossing the Danube the 236th took part in the battles outside Budapest, the Hungarian capital, in early 1945, and then advanced toward Vienna, ending the war in Austria as part of 26th Army's 135th Rifle Corps. It continued to serve in the Balkans after the German surrender, but was disbanded in the fall.

== 236th Motorized Division ==
The division began forming in April 1941 as part of the prewar buildup of Soviet mechanized forces, at Qazax in the Transcaucasian Military District as part of the 28th Mechanized Corps. Its main order of battle was intended to be as follows:

- 509th Motorized Rifle Regiment
- 814th Motorized Rifle Regiment
- 672nd Howitzer Artillery Regiment
- Antitank Battalion
- Antiaircraft Battalion
- Reconnaissance Battalion
- Sapper Battalion

Maj. Gen. Vasilii Konstantinovich Moroz was appointed to command on April 20. This cavalry officer came to the division after 10 months as a senior instructor at the Frunze Military Academy. While there was a large number of tanks (mostly T-26s) in the Transcaucasus, there is no evidence that the 236th ever had a tank regiment and was therefore never more than a partially-formed rifle division. At the start of the German invasion the division was located at Ashtarak. In a STAVKA order dated July 26, effective August 1, the 28th Corps was to form the basis of the new 47th Army in preparation for the Anglo-Soviet invasion of Iran and the 236th was officially redesignated as a rifle division. While the former Corps' two tank divisions took part in this operation, the 236th was still too raw and disorganized to play any active role.

== Formation ==
After the division reorganized its order of battle was substantially changed, and there were further changes during the course of its existence:

- 177th Rifle Regiment (from 177th Reserve Rifle Regiment; later 818th and 976th Rifle Regiments)
- 509th Rifle Regiment (from 509th Motorized Rifle Regiment; later 180th Rifle Regiment)
- 814th Rifle Regiment (from 814th Motorized Rifle Regiment)
- 687th Artillery Regiment (later 889th Artillery Regiment)
- 27th Antitank Battalion (later 28th Antitank Battalion)
- 178th Antiaircraft Battery (later 292nd Antiaircraft Battalion until March 29, 1943)
- 496th Reconnaissance Company (later 311th Reconnaissance Battalion)
- 404th Sapper Battalion
- 615th Signal Battalion (later 630th Signal Company)
- 392nd Medical/Sanitation Battalion
- 102nd Chemical Defense (Anti-gas) Company (later 10th Chemical Defense (Anti-gas) Company)
- 94th Motor Transport Company (later 665th Motor Transport Battalion)
- 337th Field Bakery (later 459th Motorized Field Bakery)
- 236th Divisional Veterinary Hospital
- 701st Field Postal Station
- 508th Field Office of the State Bank

General Moroz remained in command. At the beginning of September the division's 180th Rifle Regiment was in 45th Army, while the balance remained in 47th Army, both of which were in the redesignated Transcaucasian Front; one month later the entire division had been assigned to the 45th.

In December the 236th was again reassigned, now to the 9th Rifle Corps of 44th Army in Caucasus Front, and was officially redesignated as a mountain rifle division. However, in a report on December 20 its manpower and equipment was not that of a mountain division, especially in terms of specialized equipment:

- Total personnel – 11,113
- Rifles/Semi-automatic rifles – 6,922/1,548
- Submachine guns/Light machine guns/Heavy machine guns – 178/108/54
- Antiaircraft machine guns – 8
- 76mm howitzers/cannon – 9/16
- 45mm antitank guns/37mm antiaircraft guns – 18/4
- 122mm howitzers – 8
- 50mm mortars/82mm mortars/120mm mortars – 67/37/9

At about the same time it was reported that the personnel of the division were of roughly 40 percent Russian nationality, 20 percent Belarusian and Ukrainian, and 40 percent non-Slavic nationalities.

== Crimean Campaign ==
Caucasus Front (soon renamed Crimean Front) began its operations to retake the Kerch Peninsula overnight on December 25/26 with landings in the vicinity of Kerch itself. This was followed on December 28/29 with further landings at the port city of Feodosia which took the defending German XXXXII Army Corps utterly by surprise. The assault was led by naval infantry detachments plus the 633rd Rifle Regiment of the 157th Rifle Division and by 0730 hours the German forces had completely lost control of the port. By the end of the day elements of three Red Army divisions were ashore, including part of the 236th. The response of the German Corps commander, Lt. Gen. H. von Sponeck, was one of near panic as the communications of his own 46th Infantry Division were in immediate danger of being cut off from the rest of the Crimea. He disobeyed orders from the headquarters of 11th Army and directed the 46th to retreat from the Kerch area despite the fact that nearly 20,000 Romanian troops were on hand to counterattack Feodosia.

Sponeck ordered two Romanian brigades to counterattack the Soviet lodgement on December 30 but these troops, tired from countermarching and without artillery or air support, were quickly repulsed. 9th Corps now pushed northward to complete the isolation of XXXXII Corps. Over two days the 46th Infantry marched 120 km (75 mi) westward in a snowstorm; fuel shortages led to some motor vehicles being abandoned and heavy weapons lagged behind. When its lead elements reached the crossroads town of Vladislavovka they were shocked to find it held in strength by the 63rd Mountain Rifle Division. The German divisional commander ordered his lead regiments to crash through the position but this failed due to exhaustion and lack of artillery. Inexplicably the 9th Corps had left a 9 km-wide (5.6 mi) gap between its pincer and the south shore of the Sea of Azov through which the German division was able to escape with light losses in personnel. By January 1, 1942, the XXXXII Corps had established a new line roughly 16 km (9.9 mi) west of Feodosia. The Romanian 4th Mountain Brigade was in a strong position at Staryi Krym but the 236th was pushing against its lines.

An attack that day on the XXXXII Corps command post at Ismail-Terek by infantry and T-26 tanks of 44th Army failed with the loss of 16 vehicles knocked out. Despite this setback the army appeared to be in a good position with 23,000 troops ashore and the Axis forces appearing weak and disorganized. The 236th was holding about 13 km (8.1 mi) west of Feodosia on the Biyuk-Eget ridge, the best defensive terrain in the area, with a forward security zone 5 km (3.1 mi) farther west, while the 63rd Mountain remained on the defense in and around Vladislavovka as 51st Army moved up from the Kerch area. In fact the 44th Army was overextended and the Crimean Front was hampered by the inept leadership of Lt. Gen. D. T. Kozlov. By January 13 the commander of 11th Army, Gen. d. Inf. E. von Manstein, had concentrated more than four divisions outside Feodosia.

Manstein's counteroffensive began at dawn on January 15, focused on the 236th; Kozlov was convinced the German objective would be Vladislavovka and had therefore concentrated most of his reserves to this sector. A brief artillery preparation fell on the forward zone, followed by Ju 87s and He 111s bombing the ridge line. This was immediately followed by a German infantry assault, led by the 213th Regiment of 73rd Infantry Division along with two battalions of the 46th Division, which apparently took the forward defense by surprise and overran it. Three StuG IIIs supported the attack and knocked out two T-26s, but one of the assault guns was then knocked out by a 76 mm cannon. The commander of 44th Army, Maj. Gen. A. N. Pervushin, was badly wounded in an air attack, which disrupted command and control. By evening the 213th Regiment had taken the Biyuk-Eget ridge, completing the defeat of the 236th. The next day the German attack steadily pushed 63rd Mountain back toward the sea and threatened to isolate the 236th in Feodosia.

The 132nd Infantry Division was brought up on January 17 and attacked directly into the northern part of the port, ripping apart the remaining defenses. After taking Sarygol the 236th was effectively isolated. The Black Sea Fleet braved air attack to attempt an emergency evacuation but few troops managed to escape in this manner. Others managed to filter through German lines to the east, eventually reaching the Parpach Narrows, but by the end of the next day 5,300 men had been taken prisoner in Feodosia, mostly from the division, roughly half its strength. Among those who escaped was General Moroz and most of his command cadre. On February 6 he was relieved of his command and arrested "for the loss of control of the division". He was court-martialed and condemned to death on February 18 with the sentence being carried out four days later. He had been replaced by Col. Pyotr Ivanovich Nemertsalov.

=== Operation Bustard Hunt ===
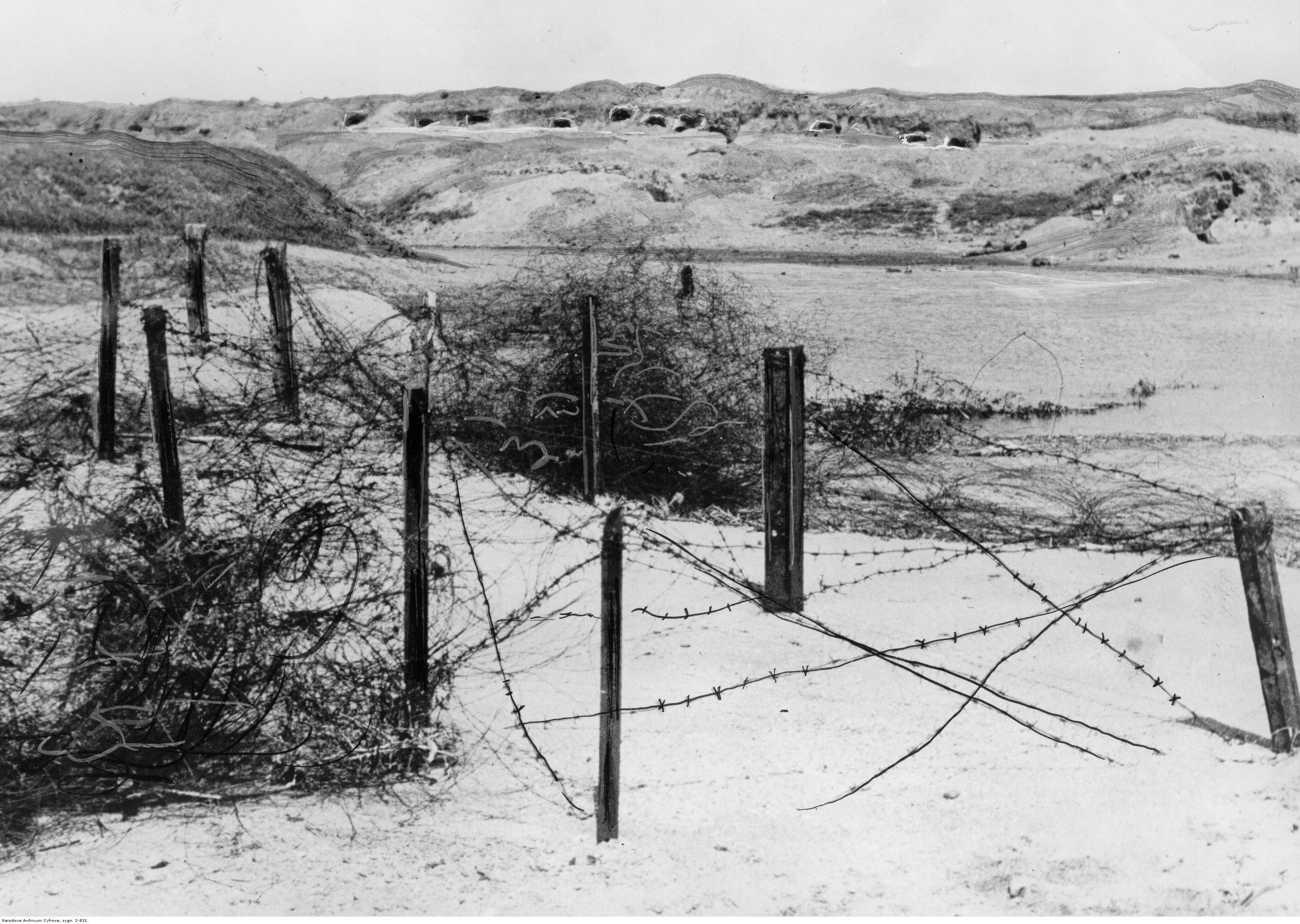
Red Army defenses on the Parpach Isthmus, May 1942

As of February 1 the 236th had lost its designation as a mountain division. Later in the month its remnants were transferred to 47th Army, still in Crimean Front, which was positioned near Kerch as a second echelon holding command for some time. Beginning on February 27 General Kozlov launched a number of offensives from his positions at the Parpach, but these did little to restore his situation while also causing heavy casualties to his forces. Before the last of these offensives ended General von Manstein began planning an operation to destroy all three armies of Crimean Front in one stroke. Operation Trappenjagd would initially target the 44th Army, which was defending a sector about 6 km (3.7 mi) long with five rifle divisions and two tank brigades. When the operation began on May 8 the division was still in 47th Army and so largely escaped the disaster that overwhelmed 44th and 51st Armies. The still-depleted 236th managed to evacuate most of its personnel and some equipment across Kerch Strait to the Taman Peninsula. By June 1 it was in North Caucasus Front, again in 44th Army. On May 30 Colonel Nemertsalov was replaced by Col. Gleb Nikolaevich Korchikov, who concurrently commanded the 396th Rifle Division for the next two weeks.

== Battle of the Caucasus ==
When 1st Panzer and 17th Armies began their part of the German summer offensive on July 7 the 236th was part of 1st Rifle Corps, which was under direct command of the Front. By the time these German forces reached the line of the lower Don River around July 25 the division (still described as "remnants") was part of 18th Army of Southern Front along with the 383rd, 395th, and 216th Rifle Divisions, 68th Naval Rifle Brigade and remnants of 16th Rifle Brigade, defending a 50 km (31 mi) sector from the Kagalnik at the mouth of the Don eastward to Kiziterinka, 20 km (12 mi) southeast of Rostov. By August 1 the division and its Army had again come under the command of the North Caucasian Front. On August 10 the STAVKA signaled the Front commander, Marshal S. M. Budyonny, in part:

With the arrival of the enemy in the Tuapse region, 47th Army and all of the front's forces located in the Krasnodar region could be cut off and end up as prisoners... Immediately push 32nd Guards Rifle Division forward and, with it, together with 236th Rifle Division, occupy three-four lines in depth from Maykop to Tuapse, and, at all costs, you are personally responsible for letting the enemy through to Tuapse.

The Front's staff replied with a detailed plan of defense on August 13. On September 1 Colonel Korchikov was relieved of his command for his conduct of the retreat and was replaced the next day by Maj. Gen. Nikita Emelianovich Chuvakov. The former officer would return to the fighting as deputy commander of the 353rd Rifle Division and later as commander of the 48th Guards Rifle Division and be promoted to the rank of major general in March 1944. The latter had been serving as deputy commander of 12th Army but refused to fully comply with the terms of Order No. 227, leading to his arrest and sentence of 2 years imprisonment, suspended until after the war. The sentence was annulled in February 1943.

=== Defense of Tuapse ===
At the start of September the division was still in 18th Army, and remained on the defense on the approaches to Tuapse. 17th Army, which had already attempted to reach the city during the previous weeks, began Operation Attika on September 23 with a total of seven divisions of the LVII Panzer, XXXXIX Mountain, and XXXXIV Army Corps, although the latter two Corps did not kick off until two days later. The objective was to capture Tuapse and encircle the bulk of 18th Army northeast of Shaumyan, where the 236th was currently positioned. While the distance to be covered was a modest 50 km (31 mi), it would require negotiating winding mountain roads against stiff resistance in deteriorating weather conditions.

By this time North Caucasian Front had been split and 18th Army was part of the Black Sea Group of Forces. The group consisted of four armies deployed along the Black Sea coast and the crest of the western Caucasus Mountains, with 18th Army on the right wing from Staroobriadcheskii to Mount Matazyk. The 236th was one of five rifle divisions in the first echelon. The defense had been augmented by the creation of the Tuapse Defensive Region under the Black Sea Fleet. However the limited road network prevented adequate supply of the forward forces.

The 97th and 101st Jäger Divisions of XXXXIV Corps began their parts in the offensive by attacking the 32nd Guards on September 25 along the Shaumyan road. This continued for three days as the Guardsmen limited the advance to only a few kilometres. The German divisions now turned to the south and assaulted the 236th and 383rd Divisions on Mount Lysaya, which fell after heavy fighting. In an effort to complete the breakthrough the assault on the 383rd's right wing was reinforced. Since this division was defending along a 25 km-wide (16 mi) sector it was forced to withdraw westward on September 30. This in turn collapsed the defenses on the right flank of the 236th and it was obliged to conform. By October 5 the mountain troops of Group Lanz had captured Mounts Gunai and Geiman, reached the valley of the Gunaika River, and was 15–20 km (9.3–12.4 mi) deep into 18th Army's defenses. On October 7, under pressure from STAVKA, the 18th Army commander, Lt. Gen. F. V. Kamkov, initiated a counterattack against Group Lanz's forward positions in the valley with the 236th, the 12th Guards Cavalry Division, 40th Motorized and 119th Rifle Brigades. This effort was hastily organized and failed to dent the German defenses. A better-planned series of counterattacks brought the German group to a halt on October 9, barely short of the Khadyzhensk–Tuapse road. 17th Army now paused for rest and reorganization until October 13.

The 17th resumed its offensive on the 14th, still attempting to reach Tuapse and encircle 18th Army. As a result of its initial successes General Kamkov was replaced by Maj. Gen. A. A. Grechko on October 18. This officer's more effective leadership, in addition to attrition of the German forces and the arrival of Soviet reinforcements, brought the offensive to a standstill by early November. By this time the 236th was providing most of the manpower for the Tuapse Defensive Region, along with the devastated 408th Rifle Division and the 408th Rifle Brigade.

== Pursuit Into the Kuban ==
Kuban Oblast in 1900. Note by 1943 Yekaterinodar was renamed Krasnodar.

As of December 1 the division was still the main formation of the Tuapse Defensive Region, especially after the disbanding of the 408th Division on November 25. As the position of the German armies in southern Russia deteriorated, especially with the encirclement of 6th Army at Stalingrad, it became clear that Army Group A would soon be forced to retreat from the Caucasus to avoid encirclement. By the beginning of the new year all Red Army forces in the region were under Transcaucasian Front, although still split between a Northern Group and a Black Sea Group, and as of January 1 the 236th was under direct command of the Front. On January 11 the STAVKA approved plans for Operations "Mountain" and "Sea" to encircle and destroy the German armies as they pulled back toward Rostov and the Kuban. The division had returned to 18th Army and was part of 16th Rifle Corps, along with the 10th and 107th Rifle Brigades, and according to the plan was to advance eastward along the Shaumyan and Khadyzhensk axis at the start of the offensive.

The army began its advance on January 14, reacting to what was believed to be a withdrawal by the German forces opposite. 16th Corps was to attack along the Tuapse road against the defenses of the 101st Jäger and elements of 4th Mountain Division, reach the withdrawal route of the German main grouping and destroy it in cooperation with 353rd Division and 40th Motorized Brigade. The Corps was in the center of the army's formation and because it faced the strongest German sector was allocated most of the army's artillery in support. When the attack began at dawn it encountered very strong resistance and harsh winter weather, with heavy rains and snow up to a metre deep, and made only modest progress of 2–8 km (1.2–5.0 mi), capturing Kotlovina and reaching the Mount Gunai and Geiman line. The next day the Corps reached the southern outskirts of Shaumyan, which was liberated on January 16, and the 236th took Navaginskii. Although none of the initial objectives had been met, the offensive did force 17th Army to accelerate its withdrawal.

On January 26 the 18th Army was directed to attack to capture Khadyzhenskaya by the end of the next day and reach the Saratovskaya region by January 30. It was then to force the Kuban River at Pashkovskaya and destroy the German Krasnodar grouping in cooperation with 56th Army. The 236th and 353rd Divisions were to attack from second echelon toward Lineinaya, Suzdalskaya, and Shabanokhabl. Due to the transportation difficulties the army was told to rely on local resources for food. 17th Army began its planned withdrawal from defensive line "F" to the line of the Kuban on January 28. On the same day the division reached the village of Abkhazskaya and pushed north from there the next day against rearguards from the 46th Infantry Division. Anticipating that the 17th Army was about to evade encirclement the Black Sea Group's forces were ordered to accelerate their pursuit, and on January 30 the division captured Kochkin, 7 km (4.3 mi) east of Zarya Vostok. The next day the 236th, in a joint advance with the 68th Rifle Brigade, reached the Vochepshiy region, 30 km (19 mi) southeast of Krasnodar. As this stage of the campaign ended on February 1 the division, which had been the strongest in 18th Army on January 10, with 6,933 personnel, had been reduced to 4,636 or 49 percent of authorized strength.

On February 4 the commander of the Black Sea Group, Lt. Gen. I. Ye. Petrov, issued orders to his 18th, 46th and 56th Armies to prepare for a converging attack on Krasnodar for the east and the south. Despite continued difficulties due to rainy weather the attack began on February 9. Maj. Gen. A. I. Ryzhov, the 18th Army's commander, almost immediately noticed that XXXXIX Mountain Corps had pulled back from the Kuban River and sent infantry to gain a crossing and then had his engineers construct a pontoon bridge. Once this was completed he sent the 40th Motorized Brigade and sent it across. On the morning of the next day German rearguards of the 198th Infantry crossed the river into Krasnodar and blew up the last bridges.

On February 11 the 236th put two rifle regiments across, including the 509th, which reached the southern outskirts of the city by 2000 hours and captured the railway station by 2300. Krasnodar was fully liberated the next day. By the start of March the division had been transferred to 46th Army. On March 4 General Chuvakov left the division to take command of the 23rd Rifle Corps. He would hold other corps commands into the postwar era, be made a Hero of the Soviet Union on October 25, and would be promoted to the rank of major general in April 1945. The new commander of the division was Maj. Gen. Nikita Fyodorovich Tsepliaev, who had been leading the 40th Motorized Brigade. Under STAVKA Order No. 46082 of March 20 was one of a group of divisions that were to be moved by rail to Millerovo in preparation for transfer to the Reserve of the Supreme High Command for redeployment to the Kursk region.

== Into Ukraine ==
By the start of May the division was in 46th Army in the Steppe Military District. At the end of the month General Tsepliaev left the division to take command of the Military Horse Breeding Directorate and was replaced by Hero of the Soviet Union Col. Ivan Ivanovich Fesin. Fesin had won the honor while commanding the 13th Motorized Rifle Brigade in battles near Rossosh and Kharkiv in January and February for continuing to lead despite being wounded in the left leg and later the left hand. He came to the 236th after his release from hospital. As of June 1 the division was still in 46th Army, now as part of Southwestern Front, where it remained into July.

Before the division could take part in the second Donbas Strategic Offensive it returned to the Reserve of the Supreme High Command with its Army and moved north. After a lengthy redeployment it reached the right (north) flank of Southwestern Front and went into action on August 25 after crossing the Siverskyi Donets River south of Kharkiv. That city had changed hands for the final time on August 21 and the 236th was exploiting the breakthrough of the German front in the direction of Dniprodzerzhynsk. On September 25-26 elements of the division were the first in the army to reach the Dniepr, and overnight successfully forced a crossing near the village of Soshinovka near Dnepropetrovsk. Under Colonel Fesin's leadership the bridgehead was entrenched and held for three days under heavy counterattacks until the remainder of the army could come up. In recognition, on November 1 he would be awarded a rare second Gold Star, and would be promoted to the rank of major general on November 17. Some 20 other soldiers of the division, including the commander of the 509th Regiment, Lt. Col. Ivan Mikhailovich Orlov, were also made Heroes for this action.

46th Army had been reassigned to Steppe Front on September 10, but early in October it returned to Southwestern Front (3rd Ukrainian Front from October 20). Later that month the division had been assigned to 26th Guards Rifle Corps. On October 25 it took part in the liberation of Dnepropetrovsk and was awarded a battle honor:

DNEPROPETROVSK - ...236th Rifle Division (Colonel Fesin, Ivan Ivanovich)... The troops who participated in the liberation of Dnepropetrovsk and Dneprodzerzhinsk, by the order of the Supreme High Command of 25 October 1943, and a commendation in Moscow, are given a salute of 20 artillery salvoes from 224 guns.

At the same time that this Dnipropetrovsk Operation was being carried out, elements of 2nd Ukrainian Front, after crossing the Dniepr farther upstream, reached Piatykhatky before driving on to Kryvyi Rih, which was liberated but then lost under the weight of counterattacks by 1st Panzer Army.

=== Nikopol–Krivoi Rog Offensive ===
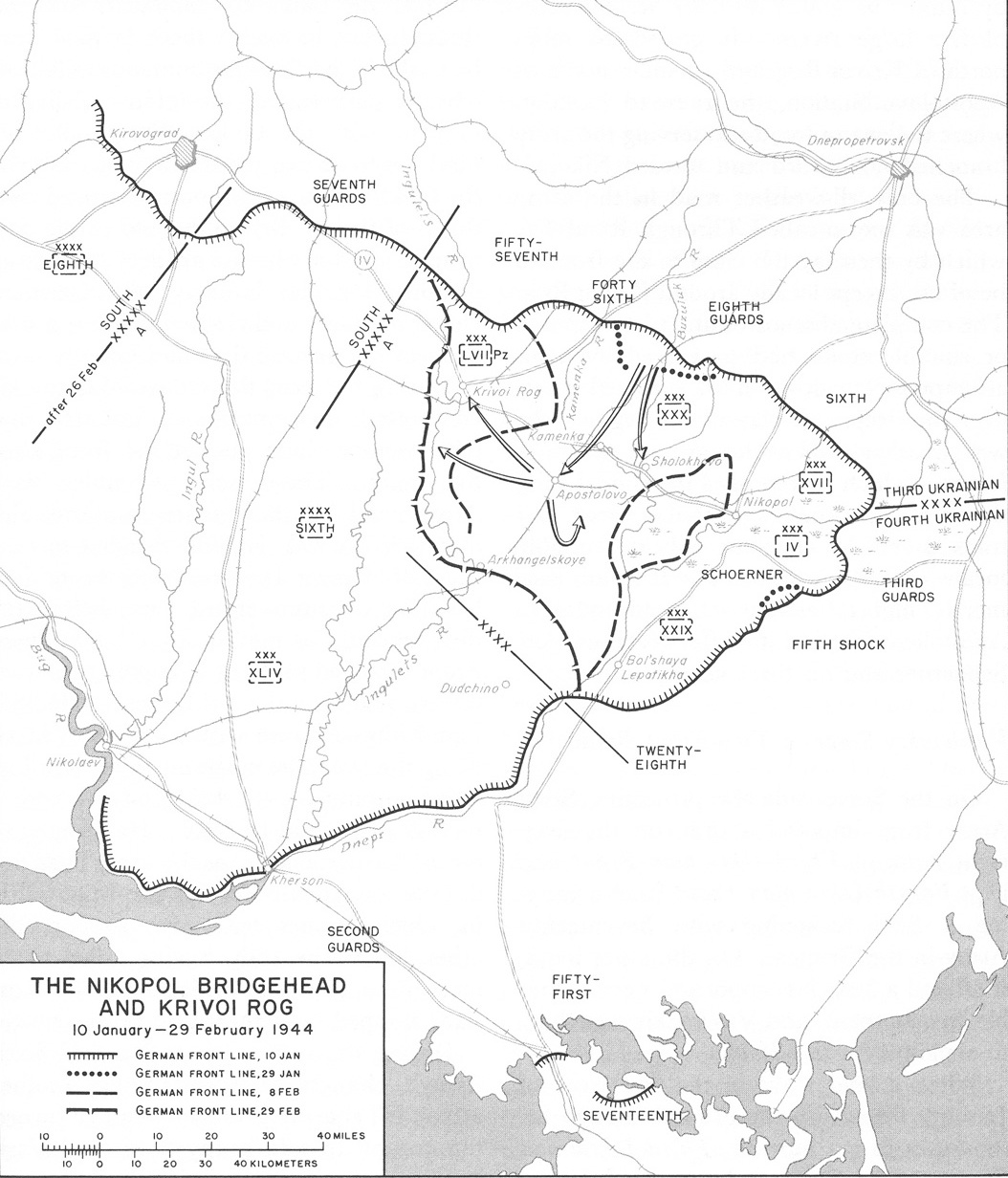
Nikopol–Krivoi Rog Offensive

By the start of the new year the 236th had been transferred to 34th Rifle Corps, still in 46th Army. On January 10, 1944, 3rd Ukrainian Front launched an attack in part with 46th Army west of the Bazavluk River against the rebuilt German 6th Army holding out in the great bend of the Dniepr, but this miscarried when the Soviet infantry failed to keep up with the tanks. Further efforts over the next three days forced the front line back about 8 km (5.0 mi) at considerable cost. The offensive was renewed on January 30 after a powerful artillery preparation against the positions of the German XXX Army Corps on the same sector, but this was met with a counter-barrage that disrupted the attack. A new effort the next day, backed by even heavier artillery and air support, made progress but still did not penetrate the German line.

When February began the division was under command of 6th Guards Rifle Corps. On that day the XXX Corps line was pierced in several places and by nightfall the Soviet forces had torn a 9 km-wide (5.6 mi) gap in the line west of the Bazavluk. During the next two days 6th Army tried to avoid encirclement by slogging through the mud to the Kamenka River line, which was already compromised by the Soviet advance. Forward detachments of 8th Guards Army reached Apostolove on the 4th and over the next few days 46th Army began to attempt a sweep westward to envelop Kryvyi Rih from the south. The dispersion of the Front's forces, combined with German reserves produced by the evacuation of the Nikopol bridgehead east of the Dniepr and indecision on the part of the German high command, produced "a peculiar sort of semiparalysis" on this part of the front during the second half of the month. Finally, on February 21 elements of the 46th and 37th Armies broke into the outer defenses of Kryvyi Rih. To avoid costly street fighting 6th Army was withdrawn west of the city, which was cleared the next day. On February 13 the 236th was awarded the Order of the Red Banner for its part in the battles for the lower Dniepr, Nikopol and Apostolove, and on the 26th it was further decorated with the Order of Suvorov, 2nd Degree, for its role in the second liberation of Kryvyi Rih.

=== First Jassy-Kishinev Offensive ===
As of March 1, the division had returned to 34th Corps and a month later was advancing under this command with the 394th Rifle Division. The 46th was one of three armies on the right flank 3rd Ukrainian Front that were tasked with continuing the offensive towards the Dniestr River while also protecting the Front's right flank. On April 8 the army was ordered to advance to the river as rapidly as possible. 34th Corps, on the army's left (south) flank, was to reach the river in the sector east of Răscăieți, 30 km (19 mi) south of Tiraspol, capture the towns of Korotnoe and Nezaertailovka near the river's east bank, force a crossing, and prepare to advance to the west. Forward detachments of the Corps reached the Dniestr late on April 11. The two divisions managed to capture small and precarious footholds on the narrow strip of flatlands west of the river but could advance no farther. In mid-April the army was ordered to attack the two German strongpoints of Cioburciu and Răscăieți. The assault on the former collapsed almost immediately but the attack by 34th Corps, which was soon reinforced by the 353rd Rifle Division, in three days of heavy fighting advanced 2–5 km (1.2–3.1 mi) deep in an 8 km-wide (5.0 mi) sector south of Răscăieți, threatening to envelop the town from the south. However, the German XXIX Army Corps reinforced the defenses at Cioburciu, allowing the 76th Infantry Division to shift most of its forces to its left wing and halt the Soviet advance. 46th Army played little subsequent role in the first offensive.

=== Second Jassy-Kishinev Offensive ===
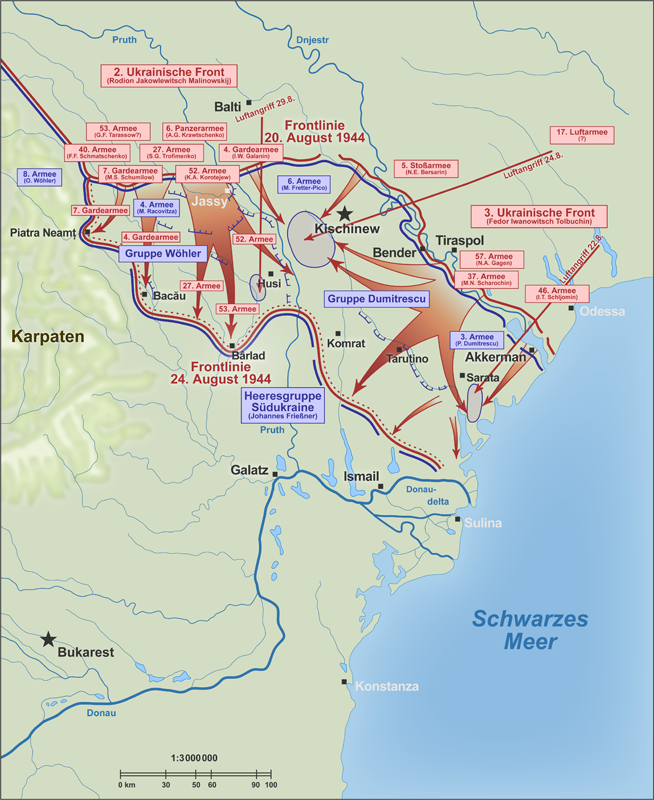
Second Jassy-Kishinev Offensive. Note initial position of 46th Army.

On June 13 General Fesin was admitted to hospital due to illness and left his command five days later, handing the division over to Hero of the Soviet Union Col. Pyotr Ivanovich Kulizhskii. Fesin would remain in hospital until August, when he became commandant of the Moscow Infantry School. He would remain in the training establishment until his retirement in 1965. Kulizhskii had won his Gold Star while leading the 152nd Rifle Division in the Dnepropetrovsk operation and would be promoted to the rank of major general on November 2; he commanded the 236th for the duration of the war. At the start of August it was still in 34th Corps of 46th Army.

From May through most of August the division had remained in much the same positions while the 2nd and 3rd Ukrainian Fronts prepared for a new offensive. 46th Army's front now ran from the western outskirts of Talmaza all the way to the Black Sea coast. In the last days before the assault, 34th Corps concentrated the 394th and 353rd Divisions in the bridgehead over the Dniestr at Purcari, while the 236th formed the army's reserve. The offensive opened at dawn on August 20, and during that day the stubborn strongpoint at Răscăieți was finally captured. Overall, 46th Army achieved all of its first-day objectives. On the second day the 34th Corps continued its advance as the German 6th and Romanian 3rd Armies were being split apart by the Front's spearheads. By the 23rd, 46th Army was in the process of encircling the Romanian forces while the 236th was concentrating in the Fridenstal area, still serving as the army's reserve. This encirclement completed the demoralization of the Romanian Army and led to that nation soon leaving the Axis. The 46th was now to completely clear the southern part of Bessarabia and occupy favorable positions for further operations into Romania.

== Into the Balkans ==
By the beginning of September the 236th had come under direct command of 3rd Ukrainian Front, and remained there into October. Through September the Front advanced through Romania and northern Bulgaria with the intention of pushing north and south of Arad for a thrust across the Tisza River to Budapest, but this was too ambitious after the lengthy offensive. On October 4 Soviet forces reached Pančevo on the north bank of the Danube 16 km (9.9 mi) downstream from Belgrade and on the 8th the railroad running into the city from the south was cut. On the night of October 14 a combined force of Soviet troops and Yugoslav partisans entered Belgrade and took the city center by the next afternoon. For this feat one of the division's regiments was awarded a battle honor:

BELGRADE - ...177th Rifle Regiment (Lt. Colonel Petrin, Nikolai Kuzmich)... The troops who participated in the battles of Belgrade, by the order of the Supreme High Command of 20 October 1944, and a commendation in Moscow, are given a salute of 24 artillery salvoes from 324 guns.

At this time the division was serving in the 75th Rifle Corps of 57th Army, still in 3rd Ukrainian Front. On November 14 the other two rifle regiments would also receive honors: the 814th would be awarded the Order of the Red Banner, while the 507th was given the Order of Bogdan Khmelnitsky, 2nd Degree. Later in October the 3rd Ukrainian Front crossed the Sava River and by the end of the month reached the Ruma area, 60 km (37 mi) northwest of Belgrade. At this time the 57th Army's forces were dispersed over a very large area with lengthy lines of communication. By the beginning of November the 236th had been shifted to the 64th Rifle Corps in the same Army.

=== Budapest Campaign ===
At the start of the Budapest Operation on October 29 the 64th Corps (19th, 236th and 73rd Guards Rifle Divisions) was fighting along the line from Hrtkovci to Progar, then along the right bank of the Kolubara River before reaching the Stara Pazova–Vojka–Nova Pazova area which was occupied by the 236th's main forces. The Corps had the task of leaving a covering force along these lines before concentrating by October 31 at crossing points on the Sava River at Belgrade, Grocka, Dubrovica, and Surduk. The Corps got over from October 31 to November 3 and was to concentrate in the Sambor–Miletic area by November 5 in preparation for a further crossing of the Danube.

Before the forcing was to begin on November 15 the division, along with the 32nd Motorized Rifle Brigade, was moved to the 57th Army reserve and was on the march in the Žabalj area. By the 15th it had reached its assigned crossing point at Kupusina. By the end of November 18 it had two rifle regiments over the river into the bridgehead that had been established by 75th Corps. These were occupying positions near the dyke 2 km (1.2 mi) northwest of Kozjak and then to the south along the dyke. The third regiment was at the crossing point. After completing its crossing the division went over to the attack and by the end of November 22 had expanded the breakthrough of the German defense up to 5 km (3.1 mi) toward the flanks and captured the Monorosz–Csiprasat and, after overcoming the last defensive line along the second dyke, advanced 3 km (1.9 mi) in the direction of Mirkovac. By this time it was again officially subordinated to 75th Corps, and as of November 24 the Corps was east of Kneževi Vinogradi–east of Grabovac–northern outskirts of Lug. One division was fighting for the former place the next day while the remainder of the Corps was held up by heavy German fire resistance. Kneževi Vinogradi finally fell on November 28.

On December 26 the Hungarian capital was encircled, and the Axis forces began operations to relieve the garrison on January 1, 1945. The third such operation, called Konrad III, began on January 18. On the morning of January 20 the German forces continued to attack to the east and northeast in an effort to capture Székesfehérvár. In reaction the 236th and 233rd Rifle Divisions were pulled into Front reserve in case they were needed to defend the southern sector of the new defensive front. Székesfehérvár fell on January 22. Two days later the headquarters of 133rd Rifle Corps was attached to 57th Army and the two divisions came under its command; the Corps formed the army's right flank along the Sárvíz Canal. The 236th relieved the 32nd Mechanized Brigade, which was pulled into the army reserve in the Tamasin area. As an indication of the rapidly evolving situation on the Soviet side, the next day the 135th Rifle Corps headquarters was also subordinated to the army and the two divisions shifted to its command. The 236th would remain in the Corps for the duration of the war. By the 26th the German relief force had reached to within 25 km (16 mi) of the inner encirclement but this proved to be the limit of the advance. On January 31, as the Front went over to the counteroffensive, a German counter-effort struck the division. Up to a regiment of infantry, supported by 80 armored vehicles and 35 tanks, was able to encircle or partly encircle most of the division's subunits, but was defeated with the loss of 15 armored vehicles, plus 700 prisoners, six guns, 30 machine guns and more than 100 motor vehicles captured.

Budapest fell on February 13. During the month the 135th Corps, which now also contained the 74th Rifle Division, was moved to 26th Army, still in 3rd Ukrainian Front. The 236th remained in this Army into the postwar. After helping to defeat the 6th SS Panzer Army in Operation Spring Awakening in March, during early April the 26th Army advanced on Vienna, which was taken on April 13, and the division ended the war advancing north of Graz.

== Postwar ==
At the time of the German surrender the men and women of the division shared the full title of 236th Rifle, Dnepropetrovsk, Order of the Red Banner, Order of Suvorov Division. (Russian: 236-я стрелковая Днепропетровская Краснознамённая ордена Суворова дивизия.) On June 15 it was assigned, along with the rest of its Army, to the Southern Group of Forces, but this was short-lived as the division was disbanded in October.
