= 353rd Division =

353rd Division may refer to:

- 353rd Infantry Division, Wehrmacht, Germany
- 353rd Rifle Division, Soviet Union

== See also ==
- List of military divisions by number
