= 266th Rifle Division =

Rifle division of Soviet Red Army during World War 2

- Active: 1st formation: July–August 1941; 2nd formation: December 1941–May 1942; 3rd formation: August 1942–1946
- Country: Soviet Union
- Branch: Red Army
- Type: Infantry
- Size: Division
- Engagements: World War II; 1st formation: Battle of Smolensk; 2nd formation: Second Battle of Kharkov; 3rd formation: Operation Little Saturn; Donbass Strategic Offensive; Second Jassy–Kishinev Offensive; Vistula–Oder Offensive; Battle of Berlin
- Decorations: Order of the Red Banner (3rd formation); Order of Suvorov (3rd formation)
- Battle honours: Artemovsk (3rd formation); Berlin (3rd formation)

The 266th Rifle Division was a rifle division of the Soviet Red Army during World War II. The 266th was formed three times during the war.

It was first formed in July 1941 from an NKVD division and destroyed during the later stages of the Battle of Smolensk in August. It was reformed in December and destroyed in the Second Battle of Kharkov in May 1942. The 266th was formed for a third time in August 1942, and fought in Operation Little Saturn, the Donbass Strategic Offensive, the Second Jassy–Kishinev Offensive, the Vistula–Oder Offensive, and the Battle of Berlin. Postwar, the division briefly remained in Germany before being withdrawn to Stalingrad, where it became a separate rifle brigade. In 1953 it was expanded into the 68th Mechanized Division, and in 1957 it became the 117th Motor Rifle Division. In 1965 it was renumbered the 266th Motor Rifle Division, and a year later transferred to the Soviet Far East. The division was based in Amur Oblast until it was reduced to a storage base in 1989.

== History ==
=== First formation ===
The 266th was first formed between 26 June and 2 July 1941 at Kaluga in the Moscow Military District as the 26th NKVD Mountain Division. It had a cadre of 1500 NKVD officers and men, and was to complete its formation as an NKVD unit by 17 July. By 2 July, it was transferred to the Red Army as the 266th Rifle Division, and consisted of the 1006th, 1008th, and 1010th Rifle Regiments, the 832nd Artillery Regiment, 557th Sapper Battalion, 379th Reconnaissance Company, and the 451st Truck Company. In early August, the 266th joined the 21st Army of the Bryansk Front. It attempted to hold the southern flank of the front and counterattack against Heinz Guderian's 2nd Panzer Group and the German 2nd Army south of Smolensk. In late August, the 2nd Panzer Group advanced south across the Desna River, breaking through the 21st Army. At this time the division was part of the army's 66th Rifle Corps and suffered heavy losses. It was disbanded on 30 August, but some of its units continued to fight under the army, and the division was still reporting its status to the army command as late as 14 September.

=== Second formation ===
The 467th Rifle Division started forming in the Stalingrad Military District on 14 December 1941. On 22 December the division was redesignated as the 266th Rifle Division at Kuybyshev in the Volga Military District. It included the 1006th, 1008th, and 1010th Rifle Regiments, as well as the 832nd Artillery Regiment, 360th Anti-Tank Battalion, 575th Sapper Battalion, 369th Reconnaissance Company, the 81st Anti-Aircraft Battery, 215th Communications Company, 295th Medical Battalion, and 451st Truck Company. After it was redesignated, the division was moved a short distance west to the Volga River area near Stalingrad. It remained there, forming and training under the Stalingrad Military District, until April 1942, when it was assigned to the Reserve of the Supreme High Command (RVGK). In late April, the 266th joined the Southwestern Front's 6th Army. On 12 May, when the Kharkov offensive in the Second Battle of Kharkov began, the 266th was an assault unit and had the most success in its initial attacks. As a result, it was farther into the pocket when the German counterattack surrounded the army in the Izyum Pocket in late May. The division never made it out and the pocket was mopped up between 26 and 28 May. The 266th was officially disbanded on 30 May. Its former commander, Alexander Tavantsev, was captured and became an officer in the Russian Liberation Army.

=== Third formation ===
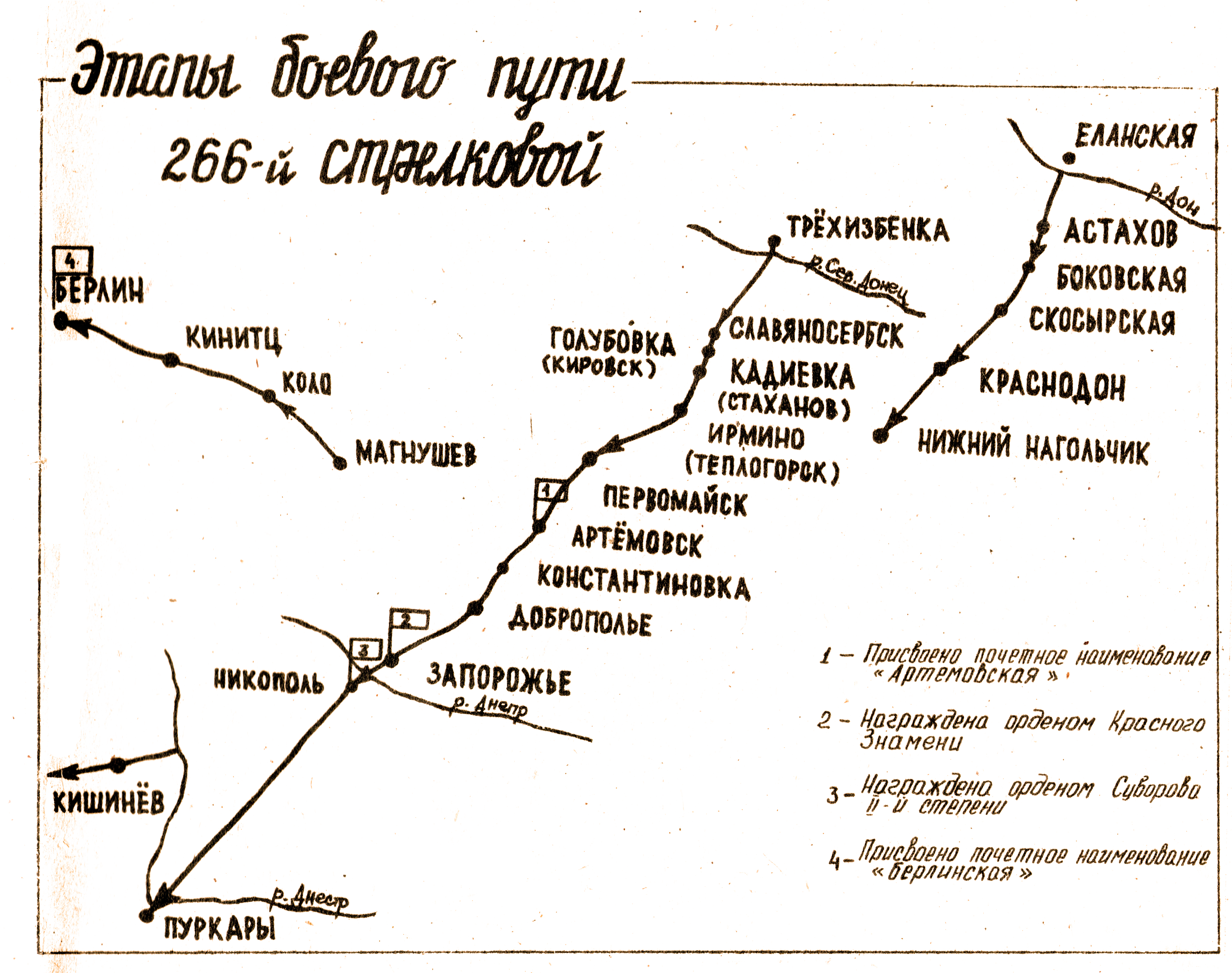
A map showing the battles of the division's third formation (not to scale)

The 266th was reformed for a third time on 26 August 1942 in Kuybyshev Oblast, part of the Volga Military District. It included the same basic order of battle as the previous formation. The division included 10,373 men, including cadres from the Barnaul and Saratov Infantry Schools, men from other Volga Military District units, convalescent wounded, and 780 non-commissioned officers and veterans transferred from the Far Eastern Front. It was commanded by Major General Leonid Vetoshnikov, a veteran of World War I and the Russian Civil War, who previously had been chief of the operations department of the Southwestern Front. The 266th remained in the district until October, when it was assigned to the 4th Reserve Army in the Reserve of the Supreme High Command. On 10 November, the division went to the front with the army, which became the 2nd Guards Army and was assigned to the Southwestern Front. Just before it fought in Operation Little Saturn in December, the division included 10,163 officers and men, who were equipped with 7,229 rifles, 931 submachine guns, 250 light machine guns, 81 heavy machine guns, 188 mortars, 30 45mm anti-tank guns, and 44 76mm cannon or howitzers. The 832nd Artillery Regiment was formed without its authorized 122mm howitzers, and as a result was completely equipped with 76mm guns, like other divisions formed in mid-1942. Around this time the division transferred to the 3rd Guards Army's 14th Guards Rifle Corps.

In late February 1943, the division was with the 5th Tank Army. By the end of March 1943, it was back with the 3rd Guards Army. After April, the 266th was part of the 32nd Rifle Corps. On 5 September, the division fought in the recapture of Artemovsk during the Donbass Strategic Offensive, and it was later awarded the honorific "Artemovsk". In late October, the army became part of the 4th Ukrainian Front. On 13 February 1944, the division was awarded the Order of Suvorov, 2nd class. In late February, it was transferred to the 3rd Ukrainian Front's 6th Army with the 32nd Rifle Corps. The 266th became part of the 46th Army in March and transferred to front reserves in May. In June, it joined the 5th Shock Army. It fought in the Second Jassy–Kishinev Offensive with the army and moved into the RVGK with the army in September. While in reserve, the 215th Communications Company was expanded into the 728th Communications Battalion and the 360th Anti-Tank Battalion was reequipped with SU-76 self-propelled guns and became the 360th Self-Propelled Battalion. By 1 October, the division had a total of 80 guns and howitzers of all types, 72 82mm and 120 mm mortars, 12 SU-76s, 141 Anti-Tank rifles, and 374 machine guns.

In late October, the division transferred with the 26th Guards Rifle Corps to the 1st Belorussian Front, where it fought for the rest of the war. In January 1945, during the Vistula–Oder Offensive, the division loaded 30 men into each of its 18 US 2.5 ton trucks, added enough “collected vehicle” to motorize most of the 1006th Rifle Regiment heavy weapons, and used this improvised motor rifle force to support tank units pursuing retreating German troops across Poland. By this time most of the division artillery had been motorized with half-tracks, including both Lend-Lease US M3A1s and captured German vehicles. The division fought in the Battle of Berlin from April 1945. In the battle, it was with the 5th Shock Army's 26th Guards Rifle Corps, part of the 1st Belorussian Front. During the fighting in the Oderbruch and the Battle of the Seelow Heights in mid-April, the division was hit by friendly fire from its own artillery as it reached the tree line. The division ended the war with the honorifics "Artemovsk–Berlin Red Banner Order of Suvorov".

== Postwar ==
The division remained with the 5th Shock Army's 26th Guards Rifle Corps in eastern Germany. By the northern hemisphere summer of 1946, it was withdrawn to Stalingrad in the North Caucasus Military District, where it became part of the 29th Rifle Corps and was downsized into the 18th Separate Rifle Brigade. The brigade was soon transferred to the 6th Rifle Corps. Between 1949 and 1953, the corps was part of the Don Military District. In October 1953, it was expanded into the 68th Mechanized Division, part of the 6th Rifle Corps. On 4 June 1957, the division was converted into the 117th Motor Rifle Division with the 6th Army Corps (the former 6th Rifle Corps). On 19 February 1965, it was renumbered as the 266th Motor Rifle Division, restoring its original World War II designation.

In September 1966, the 266th Motor Rifle Division was transferred from Volgograd to Raychikhinsk in Amur Oblast, and was replaced by the 82nd Motor Rifle Division at Volgograd. The division became part of the 35th Army at Raychikhinsk in 1969. In the late 1980s, the division headquarters, the 430th Motor Rifle Regiment, and the 832nd Artillery Regiment were at Raychikhinsk, the 155th Motor Rifle Regiment at Obluchye, the 785th Motor Rifle Regiment at Arkhara, and the 376th Tank Regiment at Zelvino. On 25 October 1989, it was converted into the 5508th Weapons and Equipment Storage Base.

== Commanders ==
The following officers commanded the division's first formation:

- Colonel Ivan Dryakhlov (2 July – 19 August 1941)
- Major General Vasily Neretin (20 August—killed in action 30 August 1941)

The following officer commanded the division's second formation:

- Colonel Alexander Tavantsev (22 December 1941 – 30 May 1942)

The following officers commanded the division's third formation:

- Major General Leonid Vetoshnikov (26 August 1942 – 6 January 1943)
- Colonel Latyp Mukhamedyarov (7 January – 26 April 1943)
- Major General Korney Rebrikov (27 April – 2 December 1943)
- Colonel (promoted to Major General 20 April 1945) Savva Fomichenko (3 December 1943 – after 9 May 1945)

== See also ==
- List of infantry divisions of the Soviet Union 1917–57
