= Elena Frumosu =

Moldovan politician (born 1968)

Member of the Moldovan Parliament
- In office 14 February 2011 – 9 December 2014
- Preceded by: Vlad Filat
- Parliamentary group: Liberal Democratic Party

Personal details
- Born: 22 November 1968 (age 57) Răscăieţi, Moldavian SSR, Soviet Union
- Party: Liberal Democratic Party

Elena Frumosu (born 22 November 1968) is a politician from Moldova. She has served as a member of the Parliament of Moldova since 2011.
