= Grigory Panchenko =

Soviet Army major general

Grigory Filippovich Panchenko
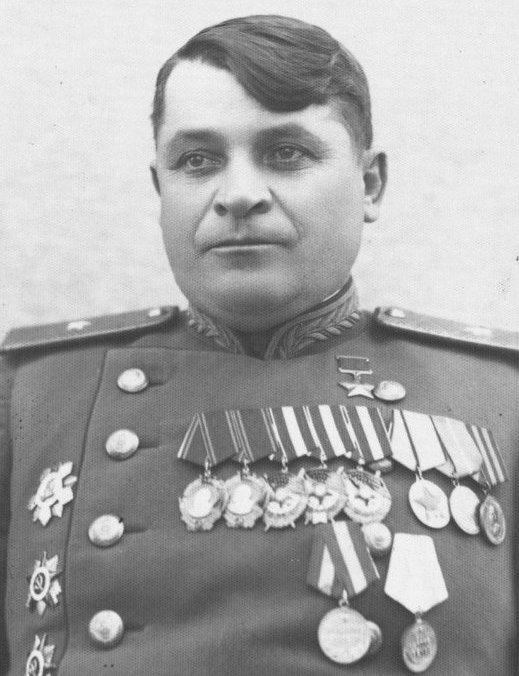
- Panchenko in the 1950s
- Native name: Григорий Филиппович Панченко
- Born: 25 December 1900; Pechenegi, Volchansky Uyezd, Kharkov Governorate, Russian Empire
- Died: 27 June 1966 (aged 65) Leningrad, Soviet Union
- Allegiance: Soviet Union
- Branch: Red Army (Soviet Army from 1946)
- Service years: 1919–1956
- Rank: Major general
- Commands: 353rd Rifle Division; 34th Guards Rifle Division; 40th Guards Rifle Division; 62nd Guards Rifle Division; 95th Guards Rifle Division
- Conflicts: Russian Civil War; World War II
- Awards: Hero of the Soviet Union

Grigory Filippovich Panchenko (Russian: Григорий Филиппович Панченко; 25 December 1900 – 27 June 1966) was a Soviet Army major general and a Hero of the Soviet Union who held divisional commands during World War II.

A veteran of the Russian Civil War, Panchenko rose through command and staff positions in the interwar Red Army and was decorated for his leadership of a regiment in the Winter War. He commanded the 353rd Rifle Division during late 1941 and early 1942 and served as deputy commander of the 2nd Mechanized Corps until his wounding in August 1943. He commanded the 40th Guards Rifle Division in the Soviet advance through southern Ukraine and into Romania during 1944, and was made a Hero of the Soviet Union for his leadership of a crossing of the Danube while deputy commander of the 31st Guards Rifle Corps. In the final weeks of the war Panchenko commanded the 62nd Guards Rifle Division. Postwar, he commanded the 95th Guards Rifle Division before failing health forced his transfer to military commissar posts.

== Early life and Russian Civil War ==
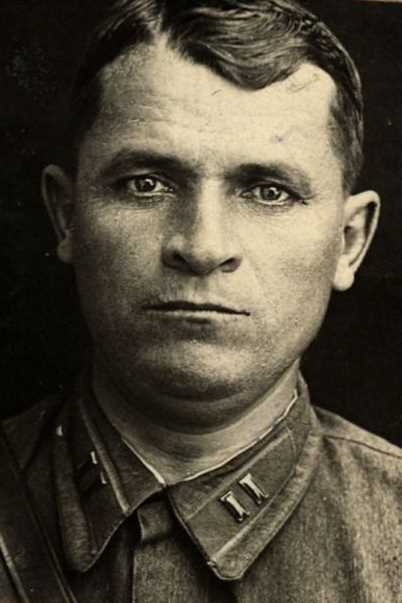
Panchenko in the late 1930s

A Ukrainian, Grigory Filippovich Panchenko was born in the village of Pechenegi, Volchansky Uyezd, Kharkov Governorate to a poor peasant family. Panchenko received a primary school education and did not have the opportunity to pass a correspondence examination for tenth grade until 1940. During the Russian Civil War, he joined the Red Army on 14 June 1919 and was sent to the supply trains of the 46th Rifle Division, serving as an ordinary soldier. In August he was transferred to the machine gun detachment of the division's 365th Rifle Regiment, fighting against the White Armed Forces of South Russia in the Kharkov Operation and at Taganrog in the Rostov–Novocherkassk Operation. After being hospitalized for illness between March and May 1920, Panchenko was posted to the 2nd Reserve Regiment. He was sent to the 41st Sumy Courses for Command Personnel in October to receive command training.

== Interwar period and Winter War ==
Panchenko was transferred to the 2nd Kiev Infantry School in March 1921, and after its disbandment, to the 1st Kharkov School for Red Starshinas, renamed the 5th Combined School for Red Starshinas in 1923. Upon graduation from the school, he was sent for on-the-job training as a section commander in the divisional school of the 23rd Rifle Division of the Ukrainian Military District. After completing this training, Panchenko was posted to the 296th Rifle Regiment of the district's 99th Rifle Division in September, where he served as a company politruk (political instructor), company commander, and responsible secretary of the regimental party bureau, charged with administrative duties.

Panchenko was moved up to the division headquarters in December 1931, serving as assistant chief of the 1st (Operations) Staff Section and the 2nd (Intelligence) Staff Section. He completed advanced training at the Specialized Intelligence Improvement Courses for Command Personnel of the 4th Directorate of the Red Army in Moscow between October 1933 and June 1934, then returned to his previous position. Panchenko, then a captain, was appointed commander of the 348th Rifle Regiment of the 51st Rifle Division of the Kiev Military District in December 1937.

He led the regiment in the Winter War, during which its parent division fought as part of the 7th Army on the Karelian Isthmus. The regiment fought on the Perojoki river in the Kämärä region between 24 February and 12 March 1940. Panchenko distinguished himself in the offensive from Suur-Pero to Mannikkala, during which his unit advanced through the roadless and fully mined Finnish defense zone. For personally leading the fighting of the regiment to take Tali and Repola from 7 to 10 March, Panchenko was awarded the Order of the Red Banner.

After the end of the war in May 1940, Panchenko, then a colonel, was appointed chief of infantry and deputy commander of the 103rd Motorized Division of the North Caucasus Military District at Voroshilovsk. From October 1940 to March 1941 Panchenko served as acting division commander.

== Eastern Front ==
A day after Germany invaded the Soviet Union on 22 June, Panchenko was appointed commander of the 16th Separate Reserve Rifle Brigade, a replacement unit at Krasnodar. He took command of the 353rd Rifle Division, forming at Novorossiysk, on 27 August. The division trained while guarding the coast in the Novorossiysk region. In mid-October, the 353rd was assigned to the 56th Separate Army, forming in the district, and took part in the Rostov Defensive Operation. After an unsuccessful attack of the army on 28 October ended with one of Panchenko's regiments reduced to 131 men, he was reprimanded in an army order for "disorganization that doomed the offensive to failure." The division, which numbered 11,192 men on 10 November, suffered heavy losses in the fighting to defend Rostov and by the time it retreated to Kamenolomni on the northwestern outskirts of the city during the night of 19–20 November only one of Panchenko's regiments remained combat effective. Leaving one regiment behind for street fighting in the city, the 353rd was ordered withdrawn through Rostov and Bataysk to Olginskaya for rebuilding. After street fighting, the remnants of the 353rd withdrew from the city to the opposite bank of the Don river on 20 November.

The division took part in the Rostov Offensive Operation that began on 27 November. Panchenko's division was assigned to the army's Eastern Operational Group, tasked with taking the stanitsa of Aksayskaya and a further advance on the settlement of Frunze. The 353rd forced a crossing of the frozen Don and by the end of the day managed to take the eastern outskirts of the stanitsa in house-to-house fighting. Continuing the attack, the Eastern Operational Group forced to the German 60th Motorized Division to retreat to the eastern and northeastern outskirts of Rostov late on the next day. Rapidly advancing, the 353rd liberated Frunze on 29 November, the day that the city was fully cleared of German resistance.

For his performance in the liberation of Rostov Panchenko was recommended by Eastern Operational Group commander Aleksey Grechkin for a second Order of the Red Banner, which he was awarded on 27 March 1942. The recommendation read:

Commander of the 353rd Rifle Division Colonel Panchenko directly led the fighting to take the stanitsa of Aksayskaya and the city of Rostov Don. Being a calming and counterbalancing influence he was able to exercise uninterrupted control in the critical moments of the battle and ensured the success of the fighting. The units of the division endured exceptionally difficult and bloody battle to take Aksayskaya, which lay on the higher bank of the Don, practically a fortress.

This was a difficult battle with the sustained resistance of the enemy. Despite this with urgent leadership the increasing tempo of battle was guaranteed and the enemy was broken. Comrade Panchenko, having communications with all units, directed these battles.

In the taking of the city of Rostov the units of the 353rd Rifle Division under the command of Colonel Panchenko also played a paramount role. Being on the outflanking flank they reached the enemy line of the retreat, forcing the enemy to abandon equipment and vehicles.

After the liberation of Rostov the 56th Army drove on Taganrog but was unable to retake that city. The army halted its attacks on 13 December, with the 353rd Division having lost 3,470 men in one week of fighting. Panchenko's division was transferred from the 56th Army on 17 December, and relocated to the Debaltsevo region, where it was assigned to the 18th Army of the Southern Front and took up defenses on the line from Debaltsevo to Greko-Timofeyevsky. In May 1942 Panchenko was sent to complete an accelerated course at the Voroshilov Higher Military Academy. After completing the course, he was appointed deputy commander of the 2nd Mechanized Corps in October. In this position, he took part in the Battle of Velikiye Luki. During the summer of 1943 the corps fought in the Battle of Kursk, Operation Kutuzov and the liberation of Oryol. Panchenko received a promotion to major general on 16 July. For his performance in the liberation of Oryol corps commander Ivan Korchagin recommended Panchenko for the Order of the Patriotic War, 1st class, which he was awarded on 1 September. The recommendation read:

Comrade Panchenko, during the period of combat operations on the Bryansk Front to eliminate the Oryol group of the enemy, displayed exceptional will, boldness, fearlessness, and skill in controlling and directing troops.

Controlling the combat objectives, assisting their leadership and leading from the front, Comrade Panchenko regularly was with the combat units and formations of the corps.

Thanks to the precise combat work of Comrade Panchenko the corps accomplished the objectives, liberating up to 80 settlements, wiping out more than 2,000 enemy soldiers and officers, taking prisoner about 150 soldiers and officers, and also wiping out and capturing a significant quantity of other military supplies and equipment.

Panchenko was wounded in battle near Kromy on 8 August and hospitalized until 9 September, then went on leave.

After recovering, Panchenko was placed at the disposal of the Military Council of the 4th Ukrainian Front in late October awaiting assignment. He took command of the 34th Guards Rifle Division on 8 November, and the 40th Guards Rifle Division on 29 November. At the time, the 40th Guards Rifle Division was in the Reserve of the Supreme High Command assigned to the 69th Army. After being brought up to strength, the division was relocated to the Krivoy Rog region in mid-January 1944, where it was assigned to the 46th Army of the 3rd Ukrainian Front. Panchenko led the division in the Nikopol–Krivoy Rog offensive against the German Nikopol bridgehead that began in late January, and then in operations on the Ingulets. Between March and April 1944 the division took part in the Bereznegovatoye–Snigirevka offensive and the Odessa Offensive. In the final stages of the Odessa Offensive Panchenko's division was the first division of the 46th Army to reach the Dniester west of Glinoye on 11 April. His unit was tasked with capturing a bridgehead at Chebruchi in an attack that began on the night of 13–14 April. The division secured a small bridgehead but could not capture the village of Chebruchi due to constant German counterattacks. After the end of the offensive, the 40th Guards Rifle Division was placed in reserve for rebuilding. In August Panchenko led the division in the Second Jassy–Kishinev offensive, during which it forced crossings of the Prut and Danube in the region of Satu Nou, reaching the 1940 Romanian–Soviet border.

Panchenko was hospitalized due to illness between 22 September and 4 December, and on his recovery appointed deputy commander of the 31st Guards Rifle Corps of the 46th Army, later transferred to the 4th Guards Army. In this capacity, he took part in the Budapest offensive and the defense against the German attack in Operation Spring Awakening. In January 1945 Panchenko led units and formations of the corps in forcing a crossing of the Danube in the region of Dunapentele and the capture of a bridgehead on the right bank of the river. For his leadership in this action, corps commander Sergey Bobruk recommended Panchenko for the Order of Suvorov, 2nd class on 12 January 1945. The recommendation was upgraded to one for the Hero of the Soviet Union, which Panchenko was awarded on 28 April. The recommendation read:

Major General Panchenko, during the period of the forcing of a crossing of the Danube, on the right flank of the corps, directly led the crossing of the 1st Battalion, 119th Guards Rifle Regiment, and subsequently that of the 4th Guards Rifle Division. Despite the absence of crossing equipment and strong pressure of enemy fire Comrade Panchenko managed to get these units across the Danube in time using improvised means, displaying in this exceptional resourcefulness and courage. During the period of the battle for the Danube I always sent Guards Major General Panchenko to the crucial sectors and, directly present with the regiments and battalions, he helped the commanders of the units and divisions to carry out the assigned objectives, instructing them on the spot how to organize the fighting and direct it.

During the period of the retreat of the corps under the pressure of superior enemy forces, General Panchenko, with a group of commanders from the corps headquarters, sometimes assisting the division commander during the retreat of the 80th Guards Rifle Division, managed to organize direction of the fighting in this sector and hold back the advance of the enemy. General Panchenko, during the retreat of the corps, displayed courage as a general twice encircled in the region of Tarján and with his courage showed exceptional steadfastness to the rest of the soldiers and officers of the 80th Guards Rifle Division.

For displaying courage to the point of self-sacrifice, for skillful leadership of the battle, both in the offensive and in the retreat of the corps General Panchenko is deserving of the award of the Order of Suvorov, 2nd class.

Panchenko took command of the 62nd Guards Rifle Division on 10 March, leading it in the Vienna offensive in the final weeks of the war.

== Postwar ==
Postwar, Panchenko continued to command the division in the Central Group of Forces. The division was disbanded in July 1946, and Panchenko placed at the disposal of the Military Council of the Central Group of Forces to await further assignment. He was appointed commander of the 95th Guards Rifle Division, stationed in Austria, in August. For health reasons he was dismissed from command in April 1947 and appointed to a desk job as military commissar of the Stalingrad Oblast Military Commissariat. Panchenko was transferred to serve in the same position for the city of Leningrad in December 1949. He was retired due to illness on 11 February 1956, and lived in Leningrad, where he died on 27 June 1966.

== Awards ==
Panchenko was a recipient of the following awards and decorations:

- Hero of the Soviet Union
- Order of Lenin (2)
- Order of the Red Banner (4)
- Order of Kutuzov, 2nd class
- Order of the Patriotic War, 1st class (2)
