= 40th Guards Rifle Division =

WWII Red Army military unit

40th Guards Rifle Division (6 August 1942 – 1945) 17th Guards Mechanized Division (1945 – April 1957) 17th Guards Motor Rifle Division (1957 – 1990s)
- Active: 1942–1991
- Country: Soviet Union
- Branch: Soviet Army
- Type: Division
- Role: Infantry
- Engagements: World War II; Battle of Stalingrad; Operation Uranus; Operation Little Saturn; Battle of Rostov (1943); Lower Dnieper Offensive; Nikopol–Krivoi Rog Offensive; First Jassy–Kishinev Offensive; Second Jassy–Kishinev Offensive; Budapest Offensive; Vienna Offensive

Commanders
- Notable commanders: Mjr. Gen. A.I. Pastrevich; Mjr. Gen. Grigory Panchenko; Col. L.Sh. Bransburg; Mjr. Gen. N.F. Sukharev

The 40th Guards Rifle Division was one of a series of ten Guards rifle divisions (32nd – 41st) of the Red Army formed from airborne troops in the spring and summer of 1942 in preparation for, or in response to, the German summer offensive. It fought in the Stalingrad area during that battle, eventually in the operations that encircled German 6th Army, and then continued to serve in the several campaigns in the south sector of the front, helping to liberate Ukraine and the Balkans, and ending the war at Vienna.

In late 1945, the division was converted into the 17th Guards Mechanized Division and was stationed in Hungary. It participated in the suppression of the Hungarian Revolution of 1956, after which it was converted into a motor rifle division with the same number. Soon afterwards, it relocated to western Ukraine, as part of the 38th Army. The division was based at Khmelnitsky for the rest of the Cold War and became part of the Ukrainian Ground Forces with the Dissolution of the Soviet Union in 1991 and 1992.

== Formation ==
The 40th Guards was formed on 6 August 1942, in the Moscow Military District from the 6th Airborne Corps. Its main order of battle was as follows:

- 111th Guards Rifle Regiment from 11th Airborne Brigade
- 116th Guards Rifle Regiment from 12th Airborne Brigade
- 119th Guards Rifle Regiment from 13th Airborne Brigade
- 90th Guards Artillery Regiment

== Stalingrad and aftermath ==
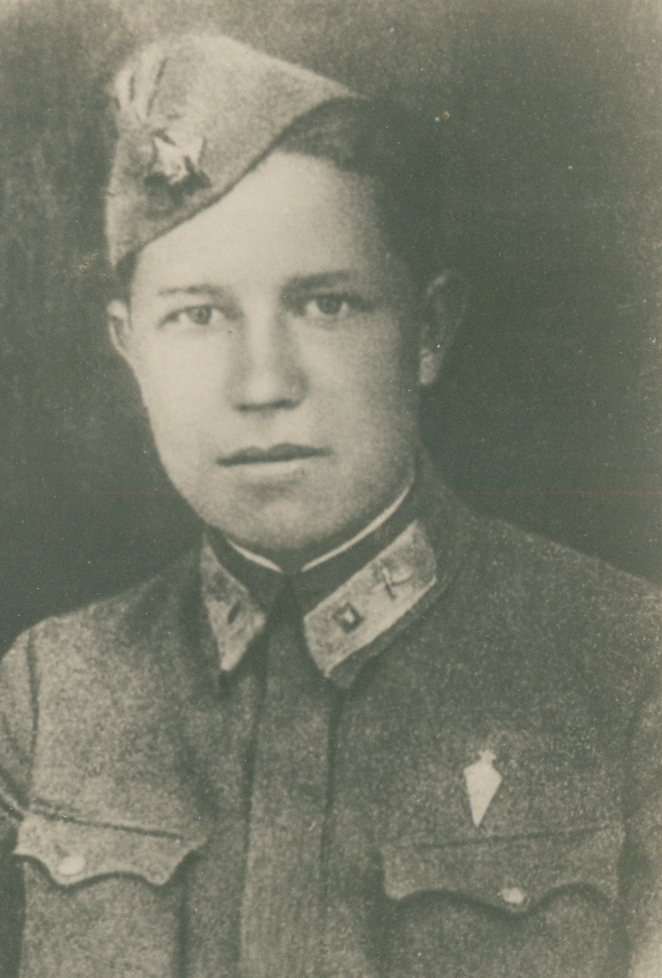
Vasily Kochetkov, a soldier of the division killed at Stalingrad and posthumously awarded the Order of Lenin

The division, along with several other of these airborne conversions, was rushed to the Stalingrad region, to begin with as part of 1st Guards Army. It departed for the front on 15 August, and spent most of September fighting along the Don River in 21st Army. Stalingrad Front was renamed Don Front on 30 September. In October, 40th Guards was transferred, this time to 65th Army, still in Don Front. In this army it was one of the assault divisions that cleared the way for 5th Tank Army in Operation Uranus as part of the northern pincer that broke through Romanian Third Army and helped encircle the German forces at Stalingrad. From early in 1943 the division was reassigned to 5th Shock Army in South Front and would remain in that army until the end of 1943. By 21 February, 40th Guards was in first echelon of its army as it moved up to the Mius River line. On 3 March, 5th Shock was fortifying the scant bridgeheads it had taken on the west bank of the river, and the advance halted for the coming months. In April, the division became part of the 31st Guards Rifle Corps, and it would remain in that formation for the duration of the war.

== Advance ==
In August 1943, South Front launched the Donbass Strategic Offensive against German Sixth Army's positions along the Mius River line, forcing it to fall back to the Dniepr with Soviet forces in pursuit. On 3 September, the division was credited with the liberation of the Ukrainian town of Yenakiyevo, and was later given its name as an honorific. South Front became 4th Ukrainian Front in October, and 40th Guards remained with it until nearly the end of the year, when it was reassigned, along with its corps, to 69th Army in the Reserve of the Supreme High Command. In January 1944, the corps was moved again, to 46th Army in 3rd Ukrainian Front.

In early April 40th Guards was approaching the lower reaches of the Dniestr River in first echelon of its corps. The division led the clearing of the east bank on 11 April and then received the following orders from army commander Lt. Gen. Vasily Glagolev:

"Force the Dnestr River in the sector from Chebruchi (incl.) [southward] to Marker 107.5 and reach positions from 500 metres northeast of Hill 145.1 through the western entrance of the forest 2.5 kilometres west of Raskaetsy, and subsequently capture Chebruchi and Hill 174.5. Begin the forcing [river crossing] operation at 2100 hours on 13 April 1944. The units of the 6th Rifle Corps [of Sharokhin's 37th Army] will attack on your right flank. The units of the 34th Guards Rifle Division will force the river on your left flank.

This attack would also be supported by the 269th Army Pontoon-Bridge Brigade.

The division commander, Mjr. Gen. Grigory Panchenko, prepared detailed plans, and on the 13th a forward detachment of assault companies from 111th Guards Rifle Regiment made a crossing and managed to secure a small bridgehead south of Chebruchi, later reinforced by the remainder of its division as well as 34th Guards, but they were stymied in their attempts to take the town. The German defenders launched at least seven counterattacks during the first 24 hours, and 40th Guards reported casualties of 30 killed and 89 wounded. On 20 April, the division, along with 34th and 4th Guards Rifle Divisions, made another attack on Chebruchi, but this collapsed immediately after it commenced. In the first week of May, all three divisions went over to the defense.

In August the division went back to the attack in the second Iasi-Kishinev Offensive, which destroyed the German Sixth Army (for the second time) and caused Romania to change sides. In September and October the 31st Guards Rifle Corps served in 2nd Ukrainian Front, still in 46th Army, but in November the corps went back to 3rd Ukrainian Front, now in 4th Guards Army. 40th Guards Rifle Division and its corps would serve under those commands for the duration. After participating in the Siege of Budapest, in the spring of 1945 the division advanced across the Hungarian plain and gained another honorific for its operations along the Danube River, ending the war near Vienna. At the end of the war, the official title of the division was 40th Guards Rifle, Yenakiyevo-Danube, Order of the Red Banner, Order of Suvorov Division. (Russian: 40-я гвардейская Енакиевско-Дунайская Краснознамённая ордена Суворова стрелковая дивизия.)

== Postwar ==
In the fall of 1945, the division became the 17th Guards Mechanized Division, headquartered at Szombathely in Hungary. The 4th Guards Army became part of the Central Group of Forces and left for the Soviet Union in August 1946, after which the division was directly subordinated to the group. In September 1955, when the Central Group of Forces disbanded, the 17th Guards became part of the Special Corps. Its headquarters was still stationed at Szombathely along with rear units and the 56th Guards Mechanized and 27th Guards Tank-Self Propelled Gun Regiments. The 58th Guards Mechanized Regiment was at Körmend, the 57th Guards Mechanized Regiment at Győr, and the 83rd Guards Tank Regiment at Hajmáskér.

Under Operation Compass, the Soviet plan for suppressing revolt in Budapest, the division, then commanded by Major General Anton Krivosheyev, was to cover the Austrian border and maintain Soviet control over Győr, Kőszeg, Körmend, and Szombathely. The division units at Hajmáskér were to be a reserve for use in Budapest if necessary. After the Hungarian Revolution began on 23 October 1956, the 2nd Guards Mechanized Division was sent into Budapest in accordance with the plan. At 20:10 on 23 October, the 17th Guards Division was ordered combat ready by the Special Corps commander, marching out of its barracks and into the previously designated concentration areas. The 83rd Tank Regiment and 1043rd Guards Artillery Regiment were ordered to immediately move on Budapest, and the 90th Guards Artillery Regiment to seal off the Austrian border. On 24 October, the 56th Guards Mechanized Regiment and a reconnaissance company were ordered to Budapest. The company was to conduct reconnaissance and protect Soviet leaders arriving in Hungary. Arriving there at 10:00, the 56th was ordered to prevent rebels from moving from Pest to Buda and seizing the government radio transmitters and communications system, while also defending the Kelenföld railway station, Budaörs Airport, and Törökbálint artillery depots. On 4 November, when the renewed Soviet assault on Budapest began, the 17th Guards were part of the 38th Army, which had been moved into Hungary, still covering the Austrian border.

The 17th Guards Motor Rifle Division was activated on 20 April 1957 in Szombathely, from the 17th Guards Mechanized Division. In February 1958 it moved back to Mukacheve with the 38th Army. On 15 July 1958 the division transferred to Khmelnytskyi. Its 27th Guards Tank Regiment moved to the 19th Guards Tank Division and was replaced by the 99th Motor Rifle Division's 105th Guards Tank Regiment. The 57th Guards Motor Rifle Regiment transferred to the 99th Division and was replaced by its 318th Motor Rifle Regiment. In 1990, the division was transferred to the 13th Army. It was taken over by Ukraine in January 1992 and by the decision of the Minister of Defense of Ukraine in September 1992, it was transformed into the 15th Separate Mechanized Brigade (uk:15-та окрема механізована бригада (Україна)).

== External links and further reading ==
- Division page at samsv.narod.ru
