= Kagalnik =

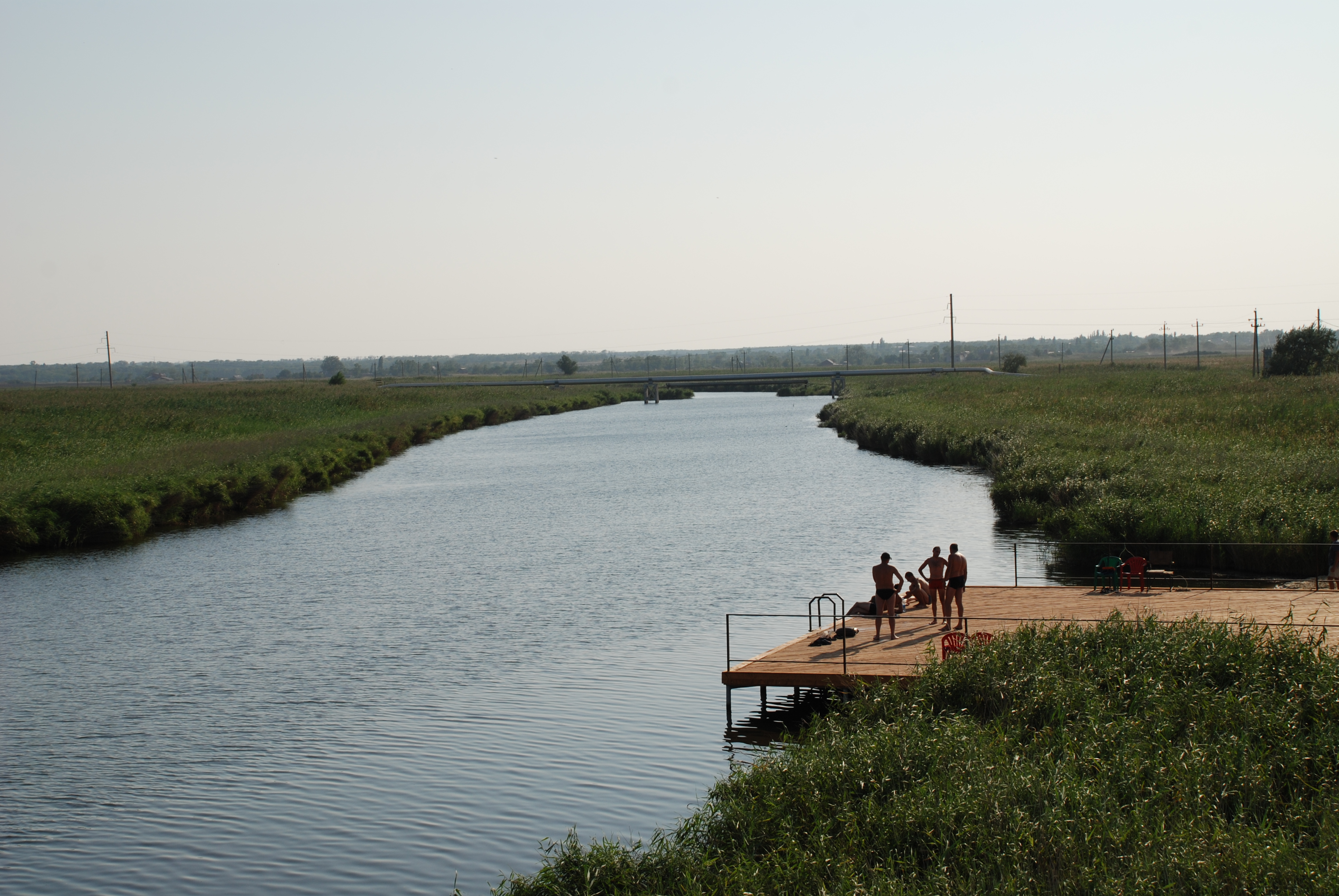

Physical characteristics
- Mouth: Sea of Azov
  - coordinates: 47.0591°N 39.3103°E
- Length: 162 km (101 mi)
- Basin size: 5,040 km^{2} (1,950 sq mi)

The Kagalnik (Russian: Кагальник) is a river in Rostov Oblast, Russia. It flows into the Sea of Azov. It is 162 kilometres (101 mi) long, and has a drainage basin of 5,040 square kilometres (1,950 sq mi).
