= Zelvino =

Zelvino Зельвино
- Settlement
- Location within Amur Oblast Location within Russia
- Coordinates: 49°45′N 129°24′E
- Country: Russia
- Region: Amur Oblast
- District: Urban okrug Raychikhinsk city
- Time zone: UTC+9:00

Zelvino (Russian: Зельвино) is a rural locality (a settlement) in urban okrug Raychikhinsk city, Amur Oblast, Russia. The population was 1,410 as of 2018. There are 30 streets.

== Geography ==
Zelvino is located 6 km south of Raychikhinsk (the district's administrative centre) by road. Raychikhinsk is the nearest rural locality.
