= Savva Fomichenko =

Soviet Army major general (1906–1974)

Savva Maksimovich Fomichenko
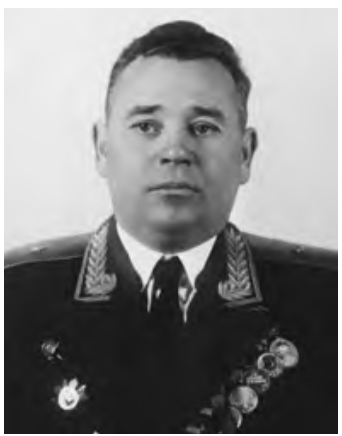
- Fomichenko, postwar
- Born: 9 September 1906; Padeyevichi, Mogilev Governorate, Russian Empire
- Died: 18 December 1974 (aged 68) Moscow, Soviet Union
- Allegiance: Soviet Union
- Branch: Red Army (Soviet Army from 1946)
- Service years: 1926–1961
- Rank: Major general
- Commands: 266th Rifle Division; 207th Rifle Division
- Conflicts: World War II
- Awards: Order of Lenin (2)

Savva Maksimovich Fomichenko (Russian: Савва Максимович Фомиченко; 9 September 1906 – 18 December 1974) was a Soviet Army major general who held divisional command during World War II.

Fomichenko rose to battalion command in the prewar Red Army and commanded the 90th Separate Rifle Brigade during the Soviet counteroffensive in the Battle of Stalingrad. After serving as deputy commander of the 266th Rifle Division, Fomichenko was promoted to command the division in December 1943. He led the 266th for the rest of the war in the Soviet advance through southern Ukraine and into Romania, ending the war in the Battle of Berlin. Postwar, Fomichenko held a series of senior staff positions before his retirement in the early 1960s.

== Early life and prewar service ==
A Belorussian, Savva Maksimovich Fomichenko was born to a poor peasant family on 9 September 1906 in the village of Padeyevichi, Igumensky Uyezd, Mogilev Governorate. Having become a Komsomol member in 1923, he chose a military career and entered the Combined International Military School in Moscow in August 1926 for command training. After the disbandment of the school in October 1927, Fomichenko was transferred to the Moscow Infantry School. Upon his graduation in August 1929 Fomichenko was posted to the 12th Rifle Regiment of the 4th Rifle Division of the Belorussian Military District, where he served as a platoon and company commander. He completed the Leningrad Armored Improvement Courses for Command Personnel between May and September 1932, then was posted to the 3rd Mechanized Brigade at Starye Dorogi, one of the first Soviet armored units. Fomichenko served with the brigade as chief of staff of a tank battalion and company commander.

Fomichenko was transferred back to the infantry in February 1933, returning to the 4th Rifle Division, this time serving with its 11th Rifle Regiment as assistant chief of staff of a regiment, and chief of staff and acting commander of a battalion. He was appointed military commandant of the city of Bobruisk on 28 May 1936. Fomichenko graduated from the Vystrel courses in 1939, and in February 1940 took command of a cadet battalion of the Pukhovichi Infantry School.

== World War II ==
After Germany invaded the Soviet Union, Fomichenko remained at the school. Then a major, he entered the Frunze Military Academy in September 1941, but was released due to the war. He was sent to the Southwestern Front between 2 and 21 October and was wounded on 17 October. Fomichenko became acting commander of the 150th Separate Rifle Brigade of the Central Asian Military District at Bayram-Ali on 15 December. Fomichenko was appointed deputy commander of the 89th Separate Rifle Brigade on 28 January 1942, and in May transferred to hold the same position with the 90th Separate Rifle Brigade at Katta-Kurgan. The brigade was assigned to the Reserve of the Supreme High Command in August and that fall moved forward to the Moscow Defense Zone. In December, Fomichenko, then a lieutenant colonel, succeeded to command of the brigade. That month, the brigade was dispatched to the Southwestern Front and assigned to the 3rd Guards Army. It took part in the Mid-Don Offensive that month and the Voroshilovgrad Offensive in January 1943.

Fomichenko was treated at a hospital for illness from February to April, then appointed deputy commander for combat units of the 266th Rifle Division on 6 April 1943. At this time, the division was holding defenses on the Mius-Front assigned to the 5th Tank Army. As deputy commander, Fomichenko organized the sniper movement in the division. The 266th took part in the Donbass Offensive from 1 September, during which it fought as part of the 3rd Guards Army, liberating Artyomovsk. Division commander Korney Rebrikov recommended Fomichenko for the Order of the Red Banner, which he received on 11 October. The recommendation read:

Lieutenant Colonel Fomichenko is a fearless soldier, a well prepared officer, disciplined, and demanding in battle. He has excellent command of the methods of directing units and formations in battle. These qualities were manifested brightly in him during the battles for the liberation of the Donbass. He personally led the 1006th and 1010th Rifle Regiments by terns, taking an active part in the leadership of combat operations to take the city of Artyomovsk. In the battles for the city of Artyomovsk he displayed personal valor, being in the combat formations of the 1st Rifle Battalion of the 1010th Rifle Regiment, leading it. Under his leadership this battalion was first to burst into the city, rousing soldiers, sergeants and officers by personal example.

Near the khutor of Oktyabrsky, they ran into a column of three German vehicles with submachine gunners. Confusion arose, Lieutenant Colonel Fomichenko quickly restored order and organized the fight, as a result of which two vehicles were disabled, one captured, and up to 20 Hitlerites wiped out. In the battle for Oktyabrsky, when the enemy suddenly attacked our units, he organized the defense and repulse of the attack, wiping out up to a platoon of Germans. In the battle for Slavyanka he was in the combat formations of the 2nd Rifle Battalion of the 1010th Rifle Regiment, when the enemy, counterattacking the regiment, cut off the battalion. Lieutenant Colonel Fomichenko quickly restored the situation and repulsed the enemy counterattack.

For skillful direction of units, as a result of which the enemy suffered repeated defeats, and for displaying personal valor and initiative in battle, Lieutenant Colonel Fomichenko is deserving of the award of the Order of the Red Banner.

Subsequently, the 266th took part in the Battle of the Dnieper, the Zaporozhye Offensive, and attacks against the German Nikopol bridgehead. Fomichenko succeeded to command the 266th on 3 December 1943 after Rebrikov was hospitalized for a concussion. He led it for the rest of the war, being confirmed in command on 15 February 1944. He led the division in the Nikopol–Krivoi Rog Offensive, the Bereznegovatoye–Snigirevka offensive and the Odessa Offensive, during which the division was transferred to the 6th Army on 14 February and the 46th Army on 19 March on the 3rd Ukrainian Front. For his performance in the Nikopol–Krivoi Rog Offensive, army commander Dmitry Lelyushenko recommended Fomichenko for the Order of Suvorov, 2nd class, which was awarded on 19 March. The recommendation read:

Colonel S. M. Fomichenko has served as division commander from 6 December 1943. A brave, sufficiently prepared commander. He knows how to organize offensive, defensive and pursuit battles well. He excellently fulfilled the objectives during the elimination of the Nikopol bridgehead and capture of the city of Nikopol from 2 to 8 February, capturing...liberating settlements: Ivanovskaya, Dneprovka, Lapinka, Alekseyevka...His units were first to assault-cross the Dnieper and to burst into and capture the southern and southeastern outskirts of Nikopol.

The division was withdrawn to the front reserve during May and June and then assigned to the 5th Shock Army, taking part in the Second Jassy–Kishinev offensive. For his performance in the Jassy–Kishinev offensive, Fomichenko was recommended for the Order of Kutuzov, 2nd class, by army commander Nikolai Berzarin, which was awarded on 13 September. The recommendation read:

Comrade Fomichenko, in the battles on the Kishinev axis, showed himself to be a strong-willed, fearless commander. The division was tasked with the objective to force a crossing of the Dniester and break through the enemy defense, six hours before the beginning of the combined offensive, to support the success of the main group. Comrade Fomichenko successfully accomplished this objective, despite isolated operations and difficult conditions, the division made a surprise assault crossing of the Dniester and breaking through the enemy defense organized a rapid pursuit, thanks to which favorable conditions were created for the offensive on the city of Kishinev. As a result of the battle significant trophies and many prisoners were captured. For the fine organization of the assault crossing, skillful leadership of battle and initiative, as a result of which the Germans suffered heavy losses and abandoned Kishinev, he is deserving of the award of the Order of Kutuzov, 2nd class.

After the end of the offensive, the 266th was withdrawn to the Reserve of the Supreme High Command and relocated to the Lutsk region for rebuilding. The division returned to action with the 5th Shock Army, assigned to the 1st Belorussian Front from 30 October. On the night of 12–13 January 1945 the 266th crossed the Vistula to the Magnuszew bridgehead. The division advanced out of the bridgehead in the Warsaw–Poznan Offensive during the wider Vistula–Oder Strategic Offensive. For his performance in the fighting for the Oder bridgeheads, 26th Guards Rifle Corps commander Pavel Firsov recommended Fomichenko for a second Order of the Red Banner, awarded on 17 March. The recommendation read:

During the period of the assignment of the 266th Rifle Division to the corps Comrade Fomichenko, commanding the division, displayed courage and skillful leadership of forces in combat operations.

During the breakthrough of the enemy defenses between 14 and 16 [January] 1945 and during the subsequent pursuit to the Oder, the division, being in the second echelon, accomplished the objective to eliminate and wipe out scattered enemy groups.

On the bridgehead on the western bank of the Oder, thanks to the skillful organization of the headquarters and cooperation with attached units, units under the command of Colonel Fomichenko showed model courage, valor and heroism, where with rapid operations they expanded the bridgehead to the depth of up to two to three kilometers and later, thanks to the steadfastness of the units, any attempts of the enemy to dislodge the units from the bridgehead were not crowned with success and a large number of attacks were repulsed with heavy losses for the enemy.

For skillful conduct of combat operations and displaying in this personal courage and heroism, Colonel Fomichenko is deserving of the award of the Order of the Red Banner.

Fomichenko led the division the Berlin Offensive in the last weeks of the war. Fomichenko was promoted to the rank of major general on 20 April, receiving his rank insignia and news of promotion at the front just before the storming of the Silesian Station. The division received the Berlin honorific for its performance in the Berlin Offensive, and Firsov recommended Fomichenko for the Order of Lenin for his performance in the Battle for Berlin, which he was awarded on 29 May. The recommendation read:

Comrade Fomichenko, during all offensive operations and battles for the city of Berlin, skillfully organizing the direction of the troops and cooperation with all attached means of reinforcement, ensured precise execution of the orders of the command.

The division, under the command of Comrade Fomichenko, operating in difficult battle conditions, in the city of Berlin (central part), inflicted great losses on the enemy, both in personnel and equipment.

For skillful organization of the headquarters of the division and successful conduct of the battle in difficult conditions in the city of Berlin, he is deserving of the Order of Lenin.

== Postwar ==
After the end of the war, Fomichenko continued to command the 266th. He entered the Voroshilov Higher Military Academy in January 1946 for advanced training. After his graduation in June 1948, he was appointed commander of the 207th Rifle Division of the Group of Soviet Occupation Forces in Germany. Fomichenko was transferred to serve as deputy chief of the Combat and Physical Training Department of the Kiev Military District in January 1951, and in July 1952 became chief of the same department of the Carpathian Military District. Placed at the disposal of the Main Cadre Directorate in June 1954, Fomichenko was sent to Czechoslovakia in September of that year as a military advisor to the chief of the Combat Training Department of the General Staff of the Czechoslovak Army. He rose to senior military advisor to this officer in October 1955. Returning to the Soviet Union, Fomichenko served as a senior inspector of the combined arms units in the Ground Forces Inspectorate of the Main Inspectorate of the Soviet Ministry of Defense. He was transferred to the reserve on 27 November 1961, and died in Moscow on 18 December 1974.

== Awards ==
Fomichenko was a recipient of the following decorations:

- Order of Lenin (2)
- Order of the Red Banner (3)
- Order of Suvorov, 2nd class
- Order of Kutuzov, 2nd class
- Order of the Red Star
- Legion of Merit (United States)
- Order of Tudor Vladimirescu, 4th class (Romania)
