= Fyodor Kolchuk =

Imperial Russian Army soldier (1894–1972)

- Born: Fyodor Samuilovich Kolchuk; September 15, 1894; Village Podlesye, Zhabinka District, Brest Region, Belarus
- Died: January 3, 1972 (aged 77); Vinnytsia, Ukrainian SSR, Soviet Union
- Military career
- Allegiance: Russian Empire (1915–1917); Soviet Union (1918–1953)
- Service years: 1915–1953
- Rank: Major General
- Commands: 214th, 208th, 210th Rifle Regiments, 24th Rifle Division; 4th Turkestan Regiment, 2nd Rifle Division; 6th Railway Brigade; 182nd Reserve Rifle Regiment; 353rd Rifle Division; 37th Rifle Corps; 1st Automobile School
- Conflicts: World War I; Eastern Front; Russian Civil War; World War II; Eastern Front
- Awards: Order of Lenin; Order of the Red Banner (Three); Order of Suvorov 2nd Class (Two); Order of Kutuzov 2nd Class; Order of the Patriotic War 1st Class; Order of the Red Banner of Labour

Fyodor Samuilovich (Samoilovich) Kolchuk (Russian: Фёдор Самуилович (Самойлович) Колчук; September 15, 1894 – January 3, 1972) was a Soviet military officer. He was a soldier of the Imperial Russian Army in World War I who rose to the rank of major general of the Red Army during the Second World War. Kolchuk's career saw a variety of highs and lows, but he eventually compiled a distinguished record of service.

== Biography ==
Kolchuk was born in western Belorussia in 1894, and was called up to the Tsar's army in 1915, but led a battalion of Red Guards in the revolution in Petrograd in 1917. While serving as a Red Guard he had the misfortune to be captured while fighting the White forces of Admiral Kolchak. He spent ten months in captivity before being conscripted into Kolchak's army in March, 1919, but soon deserted and joined the Red Army in May. He took command of a battalion on the Turkestan front later that year, and then in the Polish–Soviet War in 1920, where he was wounded in action. After the Civil War ended, Kolchuk graduated from the Vystrel Officers Course in 1924 and the Frunze Military Academy in 1931. During the 1920s he commanded each rifle regiment of the 24th Rifle Division in turn, and later the 4th Turkestan Rifle Regiment of the 2nd Rifle Division. Following the Frunze course he was appointed to command of Far Eastern Front's 6th Separate Railroad Exploration Brigade until April, 1936, and eventually earned the Order of the Red Banner of Labour.

During the Great Purge, Kolchuk was arrested in July, 1938, on charges of disloyalty and was sentenced to two years imprisonment. He was released into the reserves in July, 1941, and was first given command of the 182nd Reserve Rifle Regiment of Southern Front. On May 8, 1942, still carrying his pre-war rank of Kombrig, he took command of the 353rd Rifle Division, which he held until May 30, 1944, being promoted to Major General on November 17, 1942. He led his division through the campaigns in southern Ukraine until he was appointed to command of the 37th Rifle Corps in 46th Army. He held this post for the duration of the war, advancing through the Balkan states and into Austria. After the war he commanded rifle corps until 1950, finishing his career as chief of the 1st Automobile School. He retired in 1953 and died at Vinnytsia in Ukraine in 1972, at the age of 77.
