= 82nd Rifle Division =

82nd Rifle Division or 82nd Motor Rifle Division may refer to the following divisions of the Soviet Army:

- 82nd Rifle Division (1932–1940), the 82nd Territorial Rifle Division
- 82nd Motor Rifle Division (1940–1942), briefly designated the 82nd Motorized Division in 1941
- 82nd Rifle Division (1942–1945)
- 82nd Guards Rifle Division, 1943–1947
- 82nd Motor Rifle Division (1957–1958)

== See also ==
- 82nd Division (disambiguation)
