= Ivan Fesin =

Soviet General-major

Ivan Ivanovich Fesin
- Иван Иванович Фесин
- Born: 24 June [O.S. 12 June] 1904; Kalitvenskaya, Don Host Oblast, Russian Empire
- Died: 24 December 1991 (aged 87); Moscow, Soviet Union
- Military career
- Allegiance: Soviet Union
- Branch: Red Army
- Service years: 1926–1965
- Rank: General-major
- Conflicts: World War II
- Awards: Hero of the Soviet Union

Ivan Ivanovich Fesin (Russian: Иван Иванович Фесин; 24 June [O.S. 12 June] 1904 – 24 December 1991) was a Soviet General-major who was twice awarded the title Hero of the Soviet Union in 1943; he commanded the 13th Motor Rifle Brigade and the 236th Rifle Division during World War II. After the war he engaged in academic work, teaching at military academies and editing parts of the Great Soviet Encyclopedia.

== Early life ==
Fesin was born on 24 June [O.S. 12 June] 1904 to a family of Russian farmers. After completing parish school in 1915 he went on to attend an additional two years of school in the Rostov oblast before starting to work in farming in 1917. In 1923 he began working at a mine in Luhansk, where he remained until entering the army in September 1926.

== Military career ==
=== Prewar ===
Having entered the military in 1926, he was a regular infantryman in the North Caucasian Military District until 1927. After graduating from the Vladikavkaz Infantry School in 1930 he became a platoon commander and later a battalion commander. In 1934 he headed an NKVD regiment training program in Grozny, and then from 1937 to 1940 he commanded an NKVD battalion. He then briefly worked as a teacher before commanding a different NKVD battalion at a military school from May to July 1941.

=== In combat ===
Fesin arrived at the war front in July 1941 as he was the head of the intelligence department for the 259th Rifle Division. Promoted to commander of the 939th Rifle Regiment in August, he led the unit in the defense of the Northwestern Front; he was wounded in battle in November 1941 and was treated in Gorky. After recovering he remained away from the front for some time, attending the Military Academy of General Staff until graduating in May 1942. Upon returning in August he was in command of the 13th Motor Rifle Brigade. Under his command the unit participated in the expulsion of axis troops from the Kharkhiv and Voronezh areas. Despite sustaining a leg wound on 17 January 1943 he remained in the rank-and-file, but an arm wound on 14 February 1943 forced him to be hospitalized until April. Earlier in March, he had been awarded his first gold star.

In June 1943 Fesin was given command of the 236th Rifle Division; just a few months later, the unit crossed the Dnieper on the night of 26 September, taking a bridgehead. After the successful river crossing he was awarded the title Hero of the Soviet Union again on 1 November. However, he did not remain in command of the division for long, leaving the front in June 1944 due to health problems.

== Later life ==
From August 1944 to April 1948, Fesin headed the Moscow Infantry School. Upon graduating from the Military Academy of General Staff in 1949 he became a senior teacher in tactics, going on to become a Candidate of Military Sciences (equivalent to a holding a Ph.D.) in 1953 before retiring from the military in 1965. As a civilian he lived in Moscow, where worked for the housing department and the OSVOD before his death on 23 December 1991. He was buried in the Troyekurovskoye Cemetery.

== Awards ==
- Twice Hero of the Soviet Union (1 March 1943 and 1 November 1943)
- Two Order of Lenin (1 March 1943 and 19 November 1951)
- Two Order of the Red Banner (5 November 1946 and 30 December 1956)
- Order of Suvorov 2nd class (19 March 1944)
- Order of the Patriotic War 1st class (11 March 1985)
- Two Order of the Red Star (30 January 1943 and 3 November 1944)
- campaign and jubilee medals
