= 353rd Rifle Division =

353rd Rifle Division (August 27, 1941 – June, 1946)
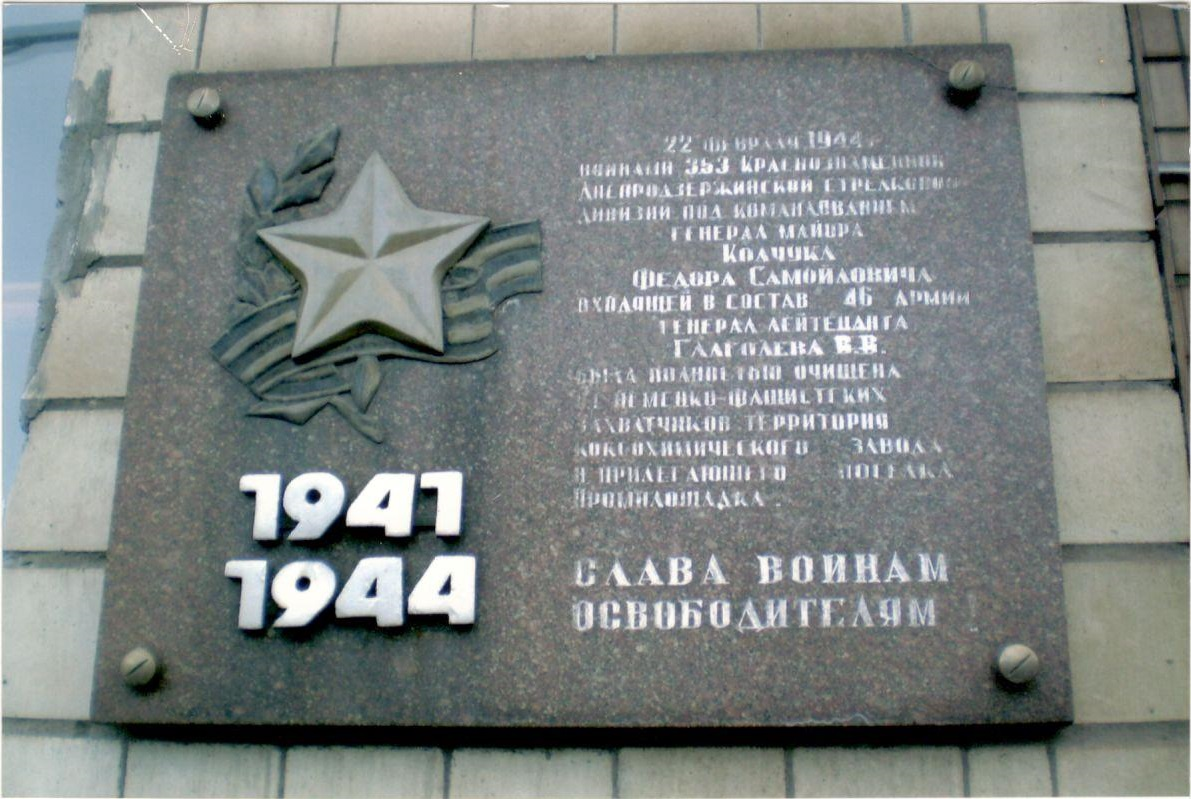
- Maj. Gen. F. S. Kolchuk
- Active: 1941–1946
- Country: Soviet Union
- Branch: Red Army
- Type: Division
- Role: Infantry
- Engagements: Battle of Rostov (1941); Operation Blue; Battle of the Caucasus; Donbass Strategic Offensive; Battle of the Dniepr; Nikopol–Krivoi Rog Offensive; First Jassy–Kishinev Offensive; Second Jassy–Kishinev Offensive
- Decorations: Order of the Red Banner
- Battle honours: Dneprodzerzhinsk

Commanders
- Notable commanders: Col. Grigory Panchenko; Maj. Gen. Fyodor Samuilovich Kolchuk; Col. Pavel Ionovich Kuznetsov; Col. Yeremei Zakharovich Karamanov

The 353rd Rifle Division formed on August 27, 1941, as a standard Red Army rifle division, at Krasnodar. It was assigned to the southern sector of the Soviet-German front, at first in 56th Army, and it would remain on this sector for the duration of the war. After assisting in the first liberation of Rostov-on-the-Don in late 1941, but in 1942 it retreated into the Caucasus region, and fought to hold the Axis forces from reaching the coast of the Black Sea. Following the retreat of the Germans and Romanians in the wake of their defeat at Stalingrad, the 353rd took part in the offensives that freed Ukraine in 1943 and 1944, winning a battle honor for the liberation of Dneprodzerzhinsk in October, 1943. In the summer of 1944 it participated in the offensive that finally drove Romania out of the Axis, and then advanced into the Balkan states. Shortly thereafter it was assigned to 37th Army, which was detached from the active army to garrison the southern Balkans, and the division remained on this quiet front for the duration of the war.

== Formation ==
The division began forming on August 27, 1941, at Krasnodar in the North Caucasus Military District. Its order of battle was as follows:

- 1145th Rifle Regiment
- 1147th Rifle Regiment
- 1149th Rifle Regiment
- 902nd Artillery Regiment

Col. Grigory Panchenko was assigned to command of the division on the day it began forming, and he continued in command until May 7, 1942. The division was one of the first assigned to the 56th Army, which was itself forming east of Rostov, in Southern Front. It first went into battle in late November, taking part in the first liberation of Rostov, one of the key initial setbacks for the German invaders. In late December the division was transferred to 18th Army, in the same Front.

== Battle of the Caucasus ==
On May 8, 1942, Kombrig Fyodor Samuilovich Kolchuk took command of the 353rd. As his pre-war rank suggests, this officer had been caught up and "repressed" during the Great Purge of the Red Army in 1937-38. Kolchuk would be promoted to the rank of Major General on November 17, and would hold this command until May 30, 1944.

When the German summer offensive began in late June, the division was still in 18th Army of Southern Front. The attack on the southern sector began on July 7, and the 353rd was in the northern half of its Front's sector, in the first echelon along the east bank of the Mius River, alongside the 383rd and 395th Rifle Divisions, with only one division and the 64th Tank Brigade in reserve. The weight of the attack by German Army Group A soon forced Southern Front into a precarious retreat into the Caucasus Mountains. By July 25 the division had been reassigned to 12th Army and was helping to defend the 40 km sector from Kiziterinka eastward to Belianin, between 20 and 50 km southeast and east of Rostov, facing the III Panzer Corps. By August 1 it was back in 18th Army, as part of the Coastal Operational Group in North Caucasus Front.

On September 23, the German 17th Army began an offensive (Operation Attika) through the high passes of the Caucasus mountains towards the Black Sea port of Tuapse. At this time the 353rd was back in 56th Army, which was part of the Black Sea Group of Forces. The attack made fairly slow progress through this difficult terrain, but by October 10 the division had been pushed back to the vicinity of the town of Anastaskevskaia, south of the enemy penetration. A renewal of the offensive on October 21 smashed the 408th Rifle Division and forced its remnants to break out and join the 353rd and 383rd Rifle Divisions; by this point 17th Army's leading troops were just 30 km from their goal. The situation demanded a counterstrike, and at dawn on October 23 the division assaulted the defenses of the 101st Jäger Division and Group Lanz south of Mount Semashkho. After difficult fighting, by day's end the 353rd had captured the mountain and encircled part of the jäger division's forces. The complex fighting in this region went on until early November until it was brought to a halt by attrition, exhaustion, and the onset of winter weather. By this time, the division was back again in 18th Army.

== Into Ukraine ==
In March, 1943, after the retreat of the Axis forces from the Caucasus mountains, the 353rd was shifted to the 37th Army, still in North Caucasus Front, and then into the Reserve of the Supreme High Command in 46th Army. It would remain in this Army until August, 1944, in Southwestern Front until October, 1943, and then its successor, the 3rd Ukrainian Front. It took part in the Donbass Strategic Offensive and the following Battle of the Dniepr, and earned a battle honor for its part in the liberation of the west-bank city of Dneprodzerzhinsk:

"DNEPRODZERZHINSK - ...353rd Rifle Division (Major General Kolchuk, Fyodor Samuilovich)... By order of the Supreme High Command of 25 October 1943 and a commendation in Moscow, the troops who participated in the battles for the liberation of Dnepropetrovsk and Dneprodzerzhinsk are given a salute of 20 artillery salvoes from 224 guns."

At this time the division was in the 6th Guards Rifle Corps, and was noted as being made up of about 40% Russians and 60% Uzbeks, Tajiks and Turkmens.

On February 26, 1944, the 353rd was decorated for its role in the liberation of the Ukrainian city of Kryvyi Rih with the Order of the Red Banner. During March, 6th Guards Corps left 46th Army, and the division was under direct Army command on April 1, serving as the Army's reserve. As it closed on the east bank of the Dniestr River in mid-April, the Army was ordered to attack the two German strongpoints of Chebruchi and Raskaetsy. The assault on the former collapsed almost immediately, but the attack by the 34th Rifle Corps, soon reinforced by the 353rd, in three days of heavy fighting, advanced 2 – 5 km deep in an 8 km wide sector south of Raskaetsy, threatening to envelop the town from the south. However, the German XXIX Army Corps reinforced the defenses at Chebruchi, allowing the 76th Infantry Division to shift most of its forces to its left wing and halt the Soviet advance. 46th Army played little subsequent role in the First Jassy-Kishinev Offensive, but as of May 1 the 353rd was officially incorporated into 34th Corps, where it would remain into the postwar.

At the end of May, General Kolchuk was reassigned to command of the 37th Rifle Corps, which he would hold for the duration. Col. Aleksey Ivanovich Melnikov took command of the division on June 1, but held it for less than three weeks before being replaced by Col. Pavel Ionovich Kuznetzov on June 19, who would continue at this post until November 8.

=== Into the Balkans ===
From May through most of August the division remained in much the same positions while the 2nd and 3rd Ukrainian Fronts prepared for a new offensive. 46th Army's front now ran from the western outskirts of Talmazy all the way to the Black Sea coast. In the last days before the assault, 34th Rifle Corps concentrated its 353rd and 394th Rifle Divisions in the bridgehead over the Dniestr at Purcari, while the 236th Rifle Division formed the Army's reserve. The offensive opened at dawn on August 20, and during that day the 353rd finally captured the stubborn strongpoint at Raskaetsy. Overall, 46th Army achieved all of its first-day objectives. On the second day the division led the advance of its Corps as the German Sixth and Romanian Third Armies were being split apart by the Front's advance. By the 23rd, 46th Army was in the process of encircling the Romanian forces, and the division had advanced as far as Plakhtiivka.

As the offensive continued, 34th Rifle Corps was temporarily transferred to 57th Army, before coming under direct command of 3rd Ukrainian Front from September to November as the advance into Romania and Hungary went on. On November 9 the division saw its final change of command with the appointment of Col. Yeremei Zakharovich Karamanov. In the same month the Corps was reassigned to 37th Army, and in December that Army became a separate army directly under command of the STAVKA, serving as a garrison for the southern Balkans for the duration of the war.

== Postwar ==
At the end of the war in Europe, the division carried the full title of 353rd Rifle, Dneprodzerzhinsk, Order of the Red Banner Division (Russian: 353-я стрелковая Днепродзержинская Краснознамённая дивизия). It was disbanded around June 30, 1946 with the 34th Rifle Corps after being withdrawn from the Southern Group of Forces in Bulgaria to Beltsy in the Odessa Military District.
