= Sergey Bobruk =

Belarusian Soviet Army lieutenant general

Sergey Antonovich Bobruk
- Born: 15 February 1901; Shubichi, Mikhailovsky volost, Pruzhansky Uyezd, Grodno Governorate, Russian Empire
- Died: 18 March 1962 (aged 61); Vinnytsia, Soviet Union
- Military career
- Allegiance: Russian SFSR; Soviet Union
- Branch: Red Army (later Soviet Army)
- Service years: 1920–1959
- Rank: Lieutenant general
- Commands: 47th Guards Rifle Division; 29th Guards Rifle Corps; 31st Guards Rifle Corps; 13th Guards Mechanized Division; 27th Guards Rifle Corps; 4th Army
- Conflicts: Russian Civil War; Kronstadt rebellion; World War II
- Awards: Hero of the Soviet Union; Order of Lenin (2); Order of the Red Banner (3); Order of Suvorov, 1st and 2nd classes; Order of Kutuzov, 2nd class; Order of the Patriotic War, 1st class

Sergey Antonovich Bobruk (Russian: Сергей Антонович Бобрук; 15 February 1901 – 18 March 1962) was a Belarusian Soviet Army lieutenant general and a Hero of the Soviet Union.

After joining the Red Army during the final phases of the Russian Civil War, Bobruk became a junior commander in cavalry units, serving in the suppression of the Basmachi movement. During the interwar period, he went on to serve in staff positions, and by the beginning of Operation Barbarossa was head of a division operational department. After serving in the Battle of Smolensk and the Battle of Moscow, Bobruk became chief of staff of the 153rd Rifle Division in early 1942, serving the latter in the Battle of Stalingrad, after which the division became the 57th Guards Rifle Division. Continuing in his position with the 57th Guards during the first months of 1943, he was transferred to become chief of staff of the 6th Guards Rifle Corps, with which he served for most of the year. Bobruk commanded the 47th Guards Rifle Division during the Nikopol–Krivoi Rog Offensive and was made a Hero of the Soviet Union for his leadership in it. In the final year of the war he led the 31st Guards Rifle Corps in its westward advance, continuing his command into the early postwar period. After serving as commander of the 4th Army in the mid-1950s, Bobruk ended his career as an advisor to the People's Liberation Army, retiring due to illness in 1959.

== Early life and Russian Civil War ==
Bobruk was born on 15 February 1901 in the village of Shubichi, Mikhailovsky volost, Pruzhansky Uyezd, Grodno Governorate in a peasant family of Belarusian ethnicity. After completing primary school in 1914, he worked as a laborer in a shoe factory in Taldom, and from 1919 was a helper and assistant machinist in the machine-mechanical workshop. During the Russian Civil War, he joined the Red Army on 28 June 1920 and was sent to cavalry courses at the 4th Tver Cavalry School. While at the school, he participated in the suppression of the Kronstadt rebellion as part of a cadet unit.

== Interwar period ==
Upon his graduation, Bobruk was appointed a platoon commander with the 18th Saratov Cavalry Courses on 1 August 1921, and in May 1922 he was transferred to Tashkent to hold the same position in the 15th Almaty Cavalry Courses of the Turkestan Front. Between November 1922 and June 1923 he underwent retraining at the Turkestan Front cavalry refresher courses in Tashkent. Upon graduation, he was sent to the 2nd Hisor Cavalry Regiment of the 1st Separate Turkestan Brigade, serving as a platoon commander and assistant squadron commander, regimental reconnaissance officer, and squadron commander. With the regiment, he fought in battles against the Basmachi of Ibrahim Bek and Kara Murza in eastern Bukhara from July 1923 to April 1925. In May of the latter year, Bobruk was transferred to the Ukrainian Military District to serve as a platoon commander in the 51st Cavalry Regiment of the 9th Cavalry Division. From April 1926, he served in the 50th Cavalry Regiment of the same division as an assistant squadron commander, commander of an economic and then cavalry platoons, acting squadron commander, and assistant regimental chief of staff. From March to June 1933 he studied at Red Army cavalry advanced training courses (KUKS) in Novocherkassk, then returned to his previous position.

Transferred to the 28th Cavalry Division of the Kiev Military District in July 1945, he served as assistant head of the 1st staff unit of the division. In April 1936 he became chief of staff of the 10th Cavalry Regiment of the 23rd Cavalry Division, and from January 1938 was acting head of the 1st staff unit of the division. In March of the latter year Bobruk was appointed assistant chief of staff of the 5th Cavalry Division, with which he fought in the Soviet invasion of Poland, advancing into western Ukraine. From February 1940, he served as chief of the 1st staff department of the 34th Cavalry Division of the Kiev Special Military District. in April, he was transferred to the Volga Military District as head of the operational department and deputy chief of staff of the 148th Rifle Division in Saratov. During the same year, he graduated from the correspondence department of the Frunze Military Academy.

== World War II ==
After the beginning of Operation Barbarossa in June 1941, Bobruk and the division as part of the 21st Army were sent from Engels to the Western Front and on 2 July the division entered the fighting at Chausy and Krichev. On 7 July it transferred to the 13th Army and fought with it in the Battle of Smolensk. In early August, elements of the 148th fought in battles on the Sozh River, retreating to the east in stubborn defensive fighting. Between 25 August and 9 September it transferred to the 3rd Army of the Bryansk Front, then returned to the 13th Army of the same front and in participated in heavy fighting with elements of the German 2nd Panzer Group. At the beginning of October it fought in the Oryol–Bryansk Defensive operation. Having suffered heavy losses, on 7 October it was withdrawn to the front reserve for rebuilding, and on 12 October began preparing the defense of Yelets. On 29 November, the division returned to the 13th Army and fought in the Yelets defensive operation. In the fighting for Yelets between 3 and 8 December, Kazaki on 11 December, and Livny between 14 and 25 December, Bobruk was reported to have shown "courage and dedication".

In March 1942, he was sent to the Volga Military District to serve as the chief of staff of the 153rd Rifle Division, forming at Chapayevsk. On 12 July, the division as part of the 63rd Army arrived on the Stalingrad Front, taking up defensive positions along the left bank of the Don River in the area of the Kazanskaya and Vyoshenskaya stanitsas, fighting in the Battle of Stalingrad. Until mid-November, the division units firmly held their positions, and in early December it became part of the newly formed 1st Guards Army of the Southwestern Front, participating in Operation Little Saturn. For its "courage and heroism", the 153rd was converted into the 57th Guards Rifle Division on 31 December. Between 4 and 16 January it fought to recapture Chertkovo and from 25 January to 21 February the division was part of Group Popov, fighting with the latter in Voroshilovgrad Offensive, during which it crossed the Seversky Donets and recaptured Slavyansk on 17 February.

From April 1943, Bobruk, now a colonel, served as chief of staff of the 6th Guards Rifle Corps. As part of the Southwestern (from 20 October the 3rd Ukrainian) Front, the corps fought in the Izyum-Barvenkovo Offensive and the Donbass Strategic Offensive. On 30 December he became commander of the 47th Guards Rifle Division, which as part of the 8th Guards Army fought in the Nikopol–Krivoi Rog Offensive. For his "skilled organization of the actions of the division" in the operation, Bobruk was made a Hero of the Soviet Union and awarded the Order of Lenin on 19 March; he received a simultaneous promotion to major general. From 27 March he became commander of the 29th Guards Rifle Corps, leading it in the Odessa Offensive. After the end of the latter, Bobruk temporarily served as chief of staff of the 8th Guards Army, and on 29 May took command of the 31st Guards Rifle Corps, which he led for the rest of the war.

Bobruk's corps served with the 3rd Ukrainian Front with the 46th and then 4th Guards Armies. It fought in the Second Jassy–Kishinev Offensive, the Battle of Debrecen, the Budapest Offensive, the Balaton Defensive Operation, and the Vienna Offensive. It helped capture Cahul, Galați, Brailov, Ruschuk, Paks, Székesfehérvár, Budapest, Kaposvár, Sopron, and Vienna. For its "exemplary performance of command tasks" during the Vienna Offensive, the corps received the Order of Suvorov, 2nd class.

== Postwar ==
After the end of the war, Bobruk continued in command of the 31st Guards, which became part of the Central Group of Forces. Entering the Higher Academic Courses at the Voroshilov Higher Military Academy in March 1946, he became commander of the Central Group of Forces' 13th Guards Mechanized Division upon graduation a year later. Transferred to command the 27th Guards Rifle Corps of the Kiev Military District in October 1953, he became commander of the 4th Army in the Transcaucasian Military District in June 1955, before being promoted to lieutenant general on 8 August of that year. Sent to China in December 1957, Bobruk served as senior military adviser to the commander of the Jinan Military Region of the People's Liberation Army. He became a military specialist in the district, serving with the group of senior specialists in PLA military districts. Retired due to illness on 28 December 1959, he moved to Vinnytsia, where he died on 18 March 1962.

== Awards and honors ==
Bobruk received the following awards and decorations:

- Hero of the Soviet Union
- Order of Lenin (2)
- Order of the Red Banner (3)
- Order of Suvorov, 1st and 2nd classes
- Order of Kutuzov, 2nd class
- Order of the Patriotic War, 1st class

A street in Pruzhany is named for him, and a memorial plaque is located there.
