= Răscăieți =

Răscăieți Раскаецы (Russian) Раскаєць (Ukrainian)
- Commune
- Location within Moldova
- Coordinates: 46°34′28″N 29°46′34″E
- Country: Moldova
- District: Ștefan Vodă District

Government
  - Mayor: Marin Zinaida (PLDM)

Area
  - Total: 47.83 km^{2} (18.47 sq mi)
- Elevation: 66 m (217 ft)

Population (2014)
  - Total: 3,114
- Time zone: UTC+2 (EET)
  - Summer (DST): UTC+3 (EEST)
- Postal code: MD-4230

Răscăieți is a commune in Ștefan Vodă District, Moldova. It is composed of two villages, Răscăieți and Răscăieții Noi.

== Notable people ==
- Elena Frumosu (born 1968), Moldova politician
