= National military formations of the Red Army =

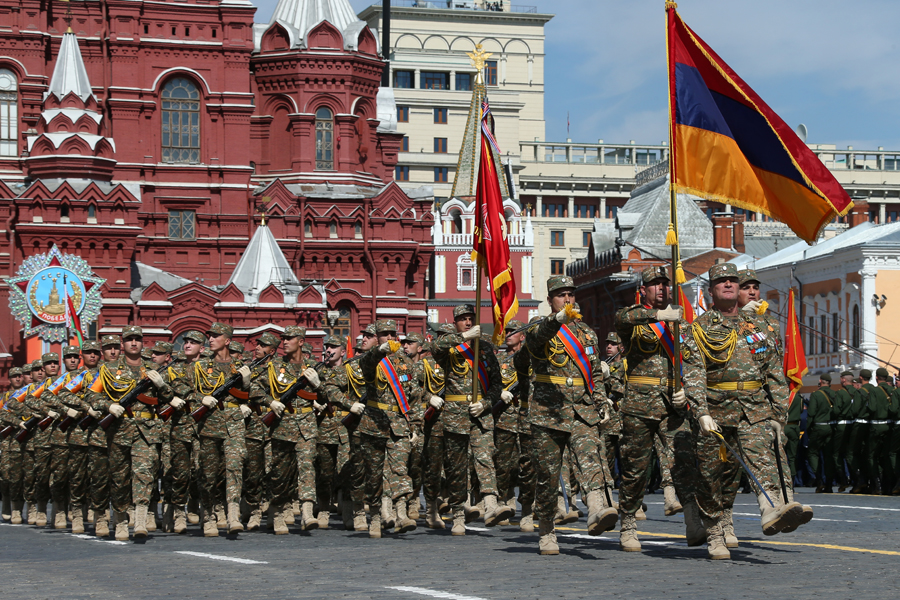
A contingent from the Armenian Armed Forces carrying the banner of the 89th Rifle Division during the 2015 Moscow Victory Day Parade.

A national military formation (Russian: Национальные воинские формирования) refers to a regiment/division in the Soviet Red Army of the Soviet Union, formed before and during the Second World War on the basis of nationalities of the personnel in their ranks. In addition to national units, representatives of all nationalities served in ordinary military formations not divided according to national or other grounds.

In its first days of its existence, the Red Army followed the Russian tradition of forming national military units, either openly (a unit with a "national" name was created, staffed mainly by representatives of that nationality), or by the "concentration" method, in which conscripts of the same nationality were sent to one compound. Many similar units in the former Imperial Russian Army had existed for years, and many national Bolshevik military units took part in the October Revolution of 1917. During the Russian Civil War, national units had what was considered to be an impressive battle record. The policy was the brainchild of Mikhail Frunze, who made sure that national formations were of different sizes, ranging from platoons to divisions. For the training of military personnel of these units, special educational institutions were created. As a rule, national formations served in the areas where they were formed.

This part of Soviet nationalities policy was controversial in the Soviet leadership, who doubted that they would be able to control the units. The proportion of soldiers of the Red Army serving in national military units was always small. In 1934, the Belarusian and Ukrainian national units were disbanded and at the beginning of 1938, less than 2% of the Red Army served in national formations. in 1938, a special decree of the Central Committee of the Bolshevik Party and the Council of People's Commissars "On National Units and Formations of the Red Army", abolished all national formations and introduced a unified procedure for military service for representatives of the country's ethnic communities.

The outbreak of the Second World War a year later and the Great Patriotic War two years after that, forced the Soviet government to reverse this decision. The reformation of national units began in August 1941 by order of the State Defense Committee, two months after the start of Operation Barbarossa. This was meant to be a counter to the collaborationist formations composed of Soviet nationals in occupied parts of the USSR (such as the Kaminski Brigade, the Armenian Legion, and the Turkestan Legion). The first formation ever raised was the 201st Latvian Rifle Division, with 90% of its personnel being residents of the Latvian SSR and more than half consisting of ethnic Latvians. Many national formations lost their nationality specification after the war, continuing to exist in numbers until the 1950s.

== List of units ==
=== Azerbaijan SSR ===
- 27th Mountain Division
- 77th Mountain Rifle Division named for Sergo Ordzhonikidze
- 151st Infantry Division
- 217th Infantry Division
- 223rd Infantry Division
- 227th Infantry Division
- 271st Rifle Division
- 396th Infantry Division
- 402nd Rifle Division
- 416th Rifle Division

=== Armenian SSR ===
- 390th Rifle Division
- 408th Rifle Division
- 409th Rifle Division
- 89th Rifle Division
- 76th Rifle Division
- 201st Rifle Division
- 17th Mountain Rifle Division

=== Bashkir ASSR ===
- 16th Guards Cavalry Division
- 113th Cavalry Division

=== Buryat-Mongolian and Yakut ASSR ===
- 321st Infantry Division

=== Chechen-Ingush ASSR ===
- 114th Cavalry Division

=== Estonian SSR ===
- 8th Estonian Rifle Corps
- 7th Rifle Division
- 249th Estonian Rifle Division

=== Georgian SSR ===
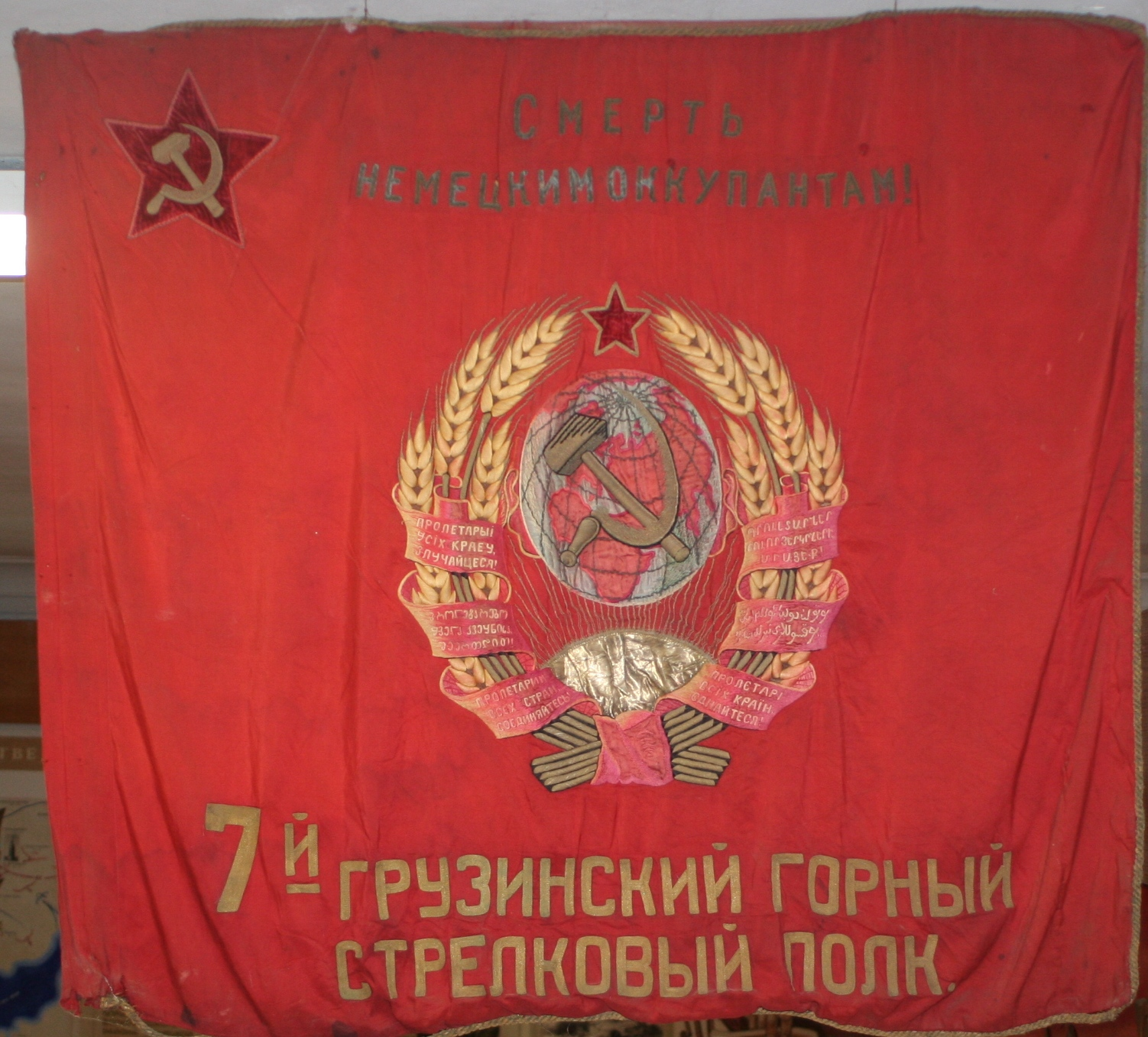
The banner of the 7th Georgian Mountain Rifle Regiment.

- 9th Mountain Rifle Division
- 47th Mountain Rifle Division "Comrade Stalin"
- 63rd Mountain Rifle Division "Mikhail Frunze"
- 276th Red Banner Rifle Division
- 296th Rifle Division
- 349th Rifle Division
- 392nd Rifle Division
- 406th Rifle Division
- 414th Rifle Division

=== Kabardino-Balkarian ASSR ===
- 115th Cavalry Division

=== Kalmyk ASSR ===
- 110th Cavalry Division
- 111th Cavalry Division

=== Kazakh SSR ===
- 100th Kazakh Rifle Brigade
- 101st Separate Rifle Brigade
- 102nd Separate Rifle Brigade
- 151st Separate Rifle Brigade
- 105th Cavalry Division
- 106th Cavalry Division
- 196th Infantry Division

=== Kirghiz SSR ===
- 107th Cavalry Division
- 108th Cavalry Division
- 109th Cavalry Division

=== Latvian SSR ===
- 76th Latvian Special Rifle Regiment
- 1st Latvian Night Light Bomber Aviation Regiment
- 201st Latvian Rifle Division
- 43rd Guards Rifle Division
- 308th Latvian Infantry Division
- 130th Rifle Corps

=== Lithuanian SSR ===
- 16th Rifle Division
- 50th Reserve Rifle Division

=== Moldovan SSR ===
- 14th Assault Engineering and Combat Brigade
- 507th Army Anti-Tank Kishinev Artillery Regiment
- 95th Rifle Division, First Formation. Formed 1927, "Moldovan" designation given c. 16 January 1934. See ru:95-я стрелковая дивизия (1-го формирования).

=== Tajik SSR ===
- 17th Guards Cavalry Division (founded as the 20th Tajik Mountain Cavalry Division)
- 98th Rifle Brigade
- 99th Rifle Brigade
- 104th Cavalry Division

=== Turkmen SSR ===
- 68th Mountain Rifle Division
- 18th Cavalry Division
- 62nd Turkestan Rifle Division
- 72nd Mountain Division
- 97th Cavalry Division
- 98th Cavalry Division
- 87th Separate Rifle Brigade
- 88th Separate Rifle Brigade
- 128th Guards Mountain Rifle Division

=== Uzbek SSR ===
- 19th Cavalry Division
- 89th Separate Rifle Brigade
- 90th Separate Rifle Brigade
- 91st Separate Rifle Brigade
- 92nd Separate Rifle Brigade
- 93rd Separate Rifle Brigade
- 94th Separate Rifle Brigade
- 95th Separate Rifle Brigade
- 96th Separate Rifle Brigade
- 97th Separate Rifle Brigade
- 99th Cavalry Division
- 100th Cavalry Division
- 101st Cavalry Division
- 102nd Cavalry Division
- 103rd Cavalry Division

=== Formations for nationalities outside the USSR ===
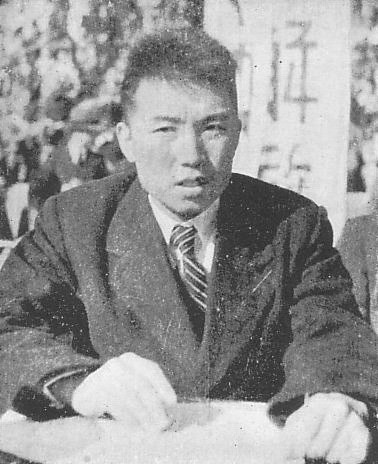
Future North Korean leader Kim Il Sung 1946. Kim was a member of a Korean national division.

The 88th Separate Rifle Brigade was unique in that it incorporated the peoples of Korea, China and Soviet Central Asia in its ranks. This unit was founded in July 1942 to accommodate the remaining forces of the Northeast Anti-Japanese United Army, who were exiled to the Soviet Union after being driven by the Imperial Japanese Army to Manchuria during the war. Chinese Major General Zhou Baozhong was commander of the brigade. Notable members have included Kim Il Sung, Lim Chum-chu and Kim Chaek.

== Notable commanders and members ==
- Kim Il Sung
- Feliksas Baltušis-Žemaitis
- Hmayak Babayan

== Legacy of national formations in the twenty-first century ==
- In a ceremony that preceded the Shushi Liberation Day and Victory Day parade in Yerevan in 2020, the Armenian Honour Guard Company took the combat flags of the six Armenian national divisions out of the Mother Armenia Military History Museum and handed them over to Armenian veterans of the war. Then, the six veterans were driven to the airport, where they handed the banners to the pilots participating in the flypast over the capital.
- During the commemorations of the 75th anniversary of the Jassy–Kishinev Offensive in 2019, the center of which was a national ceremony at the Capul de pod Șerpeni Memorial Complex, Russian Defense Minister Sergey Shoigu ceremonially handed to his Moldovan counterpart the military flags of two all-Moldovan regiments who participated in the offensive (including the 14th Assault Engineering and Combat Brigade), which until that point, were kept at the Central Armed Forces Museum.
- In Taganrog, on the Sambek Heights, there is a memorial complex known as the Glory Memorial in honor of the 416th Azerbaijani Division, opened in 1980 at the personal initiative of the First Secretary of the Central Committee of the Communist Party of Azerbaijan Heydar Aliyev. It was restored in 2011.

=== Gallery ===
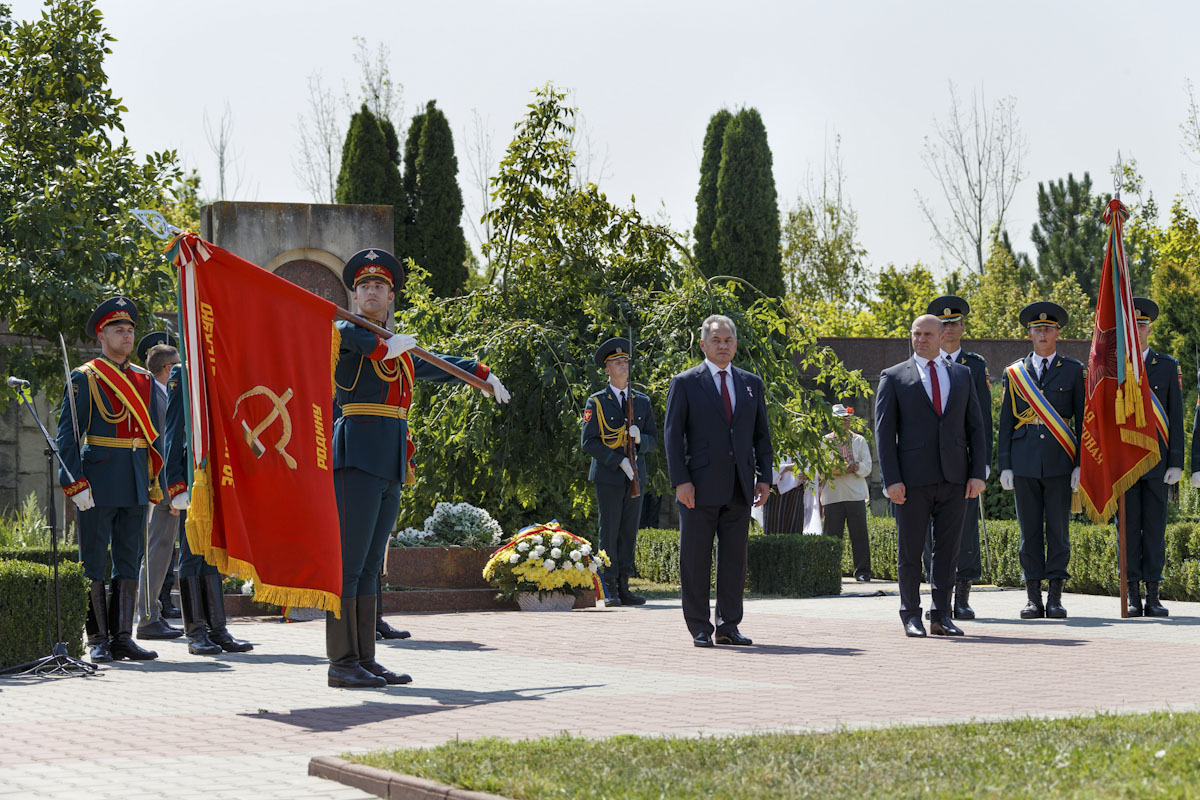
A flag ceremony in Moldova.

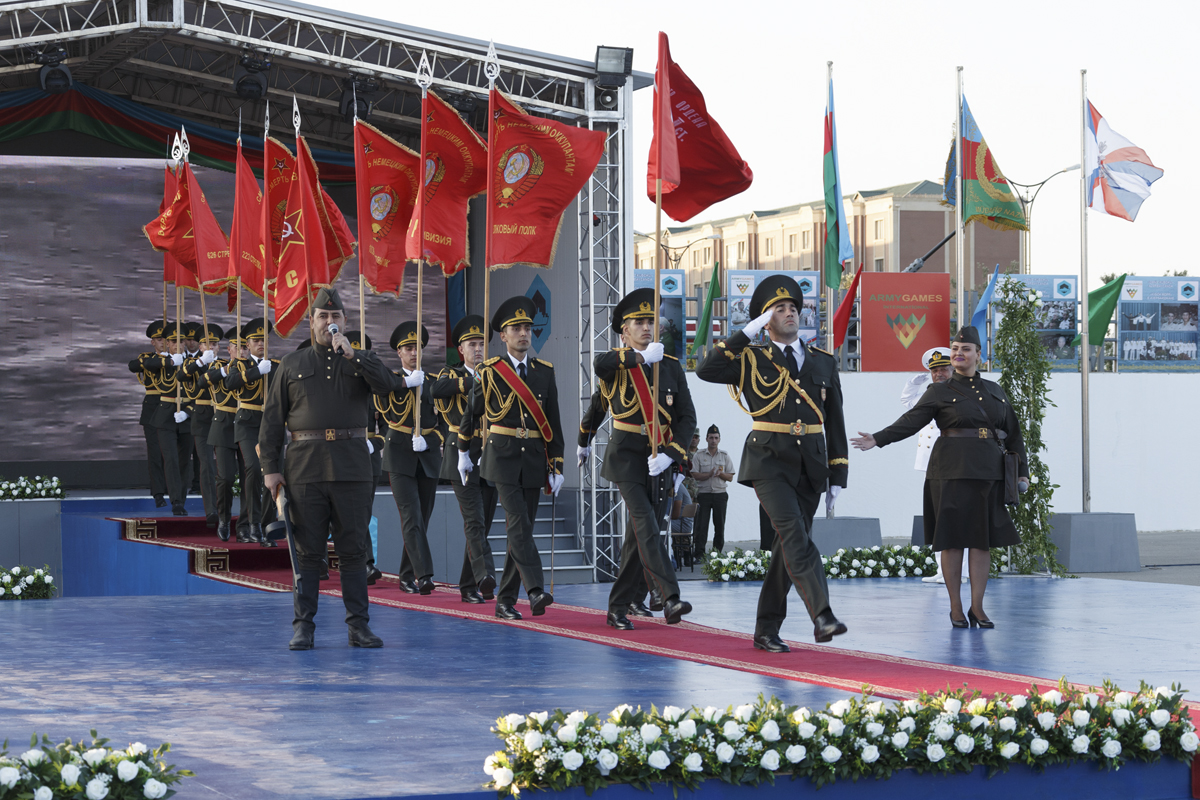
A color guard led by the Banner of Victory carrying the banners of national army units based in the Azerbaijan SSR during the 2020 Sea Cup.

== See also ==
- Korenizatsiya
- National delimitation in the Soviet Union
- Wehrmacht foreign volunteers and conscripts
- Mixed brigade
