= 271st Division =

271st Division may refer to:

- 271st Infantry Division, Wehrmacht, Germany
- 271st Rifle Division, Soviet Union

== See also ==
- List of military divisions by number
