= 338th Division =

338th Division may refer to:

- 338th Infantry Division, Wehrmacht, Germany
- 338th Rifle Division, Soviet Union

== See also ==
- List of military divisions by number
