= 111th Cavalry Division =

111th Separate Cavalry Division
- Active: January 1942 – 12 March 1942
- Country: Soviet Union
- Branch: Red Army
- Type: Cavalry division
- Size: 4,644

Commanders
- Notable commanders: Grigory Belousov

The 111th Cavalry Division (Russian: 111-я отдельная кавалерийская дивизия) was a cavalry division of the Soviet Union's Red Army during World War II. It was formed in January 1942 as the 111th Separate Cavalry Division. Formed as a Kalmyk national division, its personnel were drawn from the Kalmyk Autonomous Soviet Socialist Republic.

On 4 March, the Soviet High Command disbanded 20 randomly chosen cavalry divisions after deeming cavalry to be less effective than expected. The 111th Separate Cavalry Division was disbanded on 12 March, its best cadres and equipment being transferred to the 110th Separate Cavalry Division.

== Background ==
Following the German invasion of the Soviet Union during World War II, the latter suffered massive casualties. Over one hundred Soviet divisions were disbanded due to losses in manpower. The Soviet State Defense Committee initiated the formation of hundreds of new divisions which were quickly forwarded to the front lines. Losses of materiel among the tank divisions and mechanized corps, meant that cavalry divisions remained the only tool available for the execution of deep operations and raids. On 13 November 1941, following the suggestion of General Inspector of the Cavalry Oka Gorodovikov, the Soviets began forming 20 National Cavalry Divisions and 15 National Rifle Brigades. The new units drew upon the peoples of the Autonomous Soviet Socialist Republics of the Soviet Union, in Northern Caucasus, Central Asia, the Urals and the Lower Volga Region. Unlike typical cavalry divisions, National Cavalry Divisions were equipped and sustained using the funds of the respective republics and their formation was overseen by the local communist party committees. Most officers were appointed from among the native nationality, in order to prevent the development of a language barrier.

== Formation and dissolution ==
On 20 November 1941, Deputy Defense Narkom Efim Shadenko ordered the Kalmyk Autonomous Soviet Socialist Republic to form the 110th and 111th Separate Cavalry Divisions by January 1942. Most Kalmyks had only recently transitioned to sedentism, severely limiting the number of settlements that could host the new divisions. The 3,498 man strong 111th Separate O.I. Gorodovikov Cavalry Division was to be formed in the Esto-Haginskoe, Nemetsko-Haginskoe and Schönfeld semi-abandoned villages formerly inhabited by deported Volga Germans. Men were drafted from Zapadniy, Yashaltinsky, Pritutnenskiy, Troitskiy, Chernozemelniy and Dolbanskiy Uluses, located in the west and center of the republic; as well as its capital Elista. Since the command staff had departed the republic, the first temporary commander of the division was appointed by the local political authorities. N. Zimin assumed command. In January 1942, command was transferred to Colonel Grigory Belousov.

Mobilization and training lagged behind schedule since over 16,000 Kalmyks were employed in various engineering projects around the Caucasus. As of 20 January 1942, the 111th Division had reached a strength of 2,597 men and 1,673 horses. On 23 February, the 111th Separate Cavalry Division received its military banner and its 3,276 soldiers took the military oath. On the same day its size was expanded to 4,494 men, while soldiers were assigned to their respective units within it. As of 1 March, the 111th Division had reached a strength of 4,644 men, recruiting privates in excess of the goal set. On 4 March, the Soviet High Command disbanded 20 cavalry divisions after deeming cavalry to be less effective than expected. Despite the fact that the 111th Separate Cavalry Division was better equipped and manned it was chosen randomly and disbanded on 12 March. Its best cadres and equipment being transferred to the 110th Separate Cavalry Division. A total of 197 of the division's officers and 3,031 privates were divided between various reserve units or placed at the disposal of regional military directorates across the Caucasus.

== Commanders ==
The division was commanded by the following commanders:

- Colonel Grigory Belousov (January 1942 – 12 March 1942)
