= 50th Reserve Rifle Division =

The 50th "Lithuanian" Reserve Rifle Division (Russian: 50-я запасная литовская стрелковая дивизия, Lithuanian: 50-oji lietuviškoji šaulių atsargos divizija) was a short-lived infantry division of the Red Army at the end of World War II. Formed from forcefully mobilized Lithuanian men, the division was poorly supplied, faced major morale issues, and suffered from mass desertions. As a result, it was dissolved in January 1945. It marked an end of Lithuanian communists' hopes to form a Lithuanian rifle corps within the Red Army.

== History ==
=== Background ===
As soon as the Red Army pushed German Wehrmacht forces out of eastern Lithuania as a result of the Operation Bagration in summer 1944, Soviets started a mobilization of Lithuanian men. Lithuanians were largely able to resist German mobilization attempts and similarly hoped to resist Soviet attempts. Many men had to be forcefully taken by the NKVD, others hid in forests giving rise to the armed anti-Soviet resistance which continued until the 1950s. During 1944, a total of 63,000 men (of them 42,558 Lithuanians) were mobilized in Lithuania. Of these men, 24,100 were taken by force.

=== Formation ===
The mobilized men were first sent to the 50th Reserve Rifle Division for basic training. From this unit, men were sent to the 16th "Lithuanian" Rifle Division. Generally, Soviets attempted to send non-Russians to their national military formations of the Red Army. Until December 1944, only a few Lithuanians were sent to other units.

This division was established in August 1944 and was based in a summer camp near Yartsevo, Smolensk Oblast. Lithuanian men were transported via railway to this camp, but living conditions were abysmal. Soldiers lacked food, clothing, shoes, and lived in primitive dugouts. In his later memoirs, division's chief of staff Juozas Listopadskis described the camp looking like a concentration camp or even worse.

As winter approached, which would have made living conditions even worse, permission was given to relocate the division to Lithuania. From 15 October to 4 November 1944, about 30,000 men were transported to Lithuania. The staff was based in Vilnius while its four regiments were spread out in Gaižiūnai, Jašiūnai, Ukmergė, and Pabradė.

=== Dissolution ===
The division continued to face difficulties with living conditions and lack of food. There were outbreaks of typhoid fever. The men were demoralized and hoped that the Soviets would be pushed out by the western forces. Many Lithuanians could not speak Russian and could not communicate with their Russian commanders. Men frequently deserted armed and in groups, later joining the Lithuanian partisans. In a 15 December 1944 letter to Lavrentiy Beria, Soviet Minister of Internal Affairs, his deputy Sergei Kruglov reported that between October and mid-December about 1,750 men deserted and SMERSH agents had information about another 1,500 men who planned to desert.

Beria forwarded the letter to Joseph Stalin, Vyacheslav Molotov, Georgy Malenkov, and other officials. In January 1945, the decision was reached to disband the 50th Reserve Rifle Division and assign its regiments to other Russian divisions, mostly in the Moscow Military District.

=== Aftermath ===
Soviets continued mobilization efforts and sent Lithuanians to various Red Army units. The men served in as many as a hundred different divisions. Until the end of the war, about 108,000 men (of them 82,000 Lithuanians) were mobilized in Lithuania. An estimated 70,000 Lithuanians were sent to the front lines, where 25,000 died.

Failure of the 50th Reserve Rifle Division was a blow to Lithuanian communists who wanted to organize a Lithuanian rifle corps within the Red Army. Estonians and Latvians had their rifle corps (8th Estonian Rifle Corps and 130th Latvian Rifle Corps).

== Structure ==
The division had four regiments: 251st, 252nd, 253rd, and 254th Reserve Rifle Regiments. According to regulations, the division was supposed to have about 16,500 men. But already by 6 October, it had more than 26,000 men. The number of men later increased to 30,000. However, the division still lacked officers. On 10 November, the division had 931 officers (should have had 1,122) and 1,350 sergeants (should have had 3,030). Many of the officers were not Lithuanian: according to a report dated 6 October, the officers included 254 Lithuanians, 443 Russians, and 94 Jews.

== Leadership ==
The division's leadership included:

- Commander major general Yan Sinkevich
- Political commissar Feliksas Bieliauskas
- Chief of staff Juozas Listopadskis
