= 110th Cavalry Division =

- Active: January 1942 – 27 January 1943
- Country: Soviet Union
- Branch: Red Army
- Type: Cavalry division
- Size: 4,579
- Engagements: World War II: Case Blue; Battle of the Caucasus

Commanders
- Notable commanders: Colonel Vladimir Homutnikov

The 110th Cavalry Division (Russian: 110-я кавалерийская дивизия) was a horsed cavalry division of the Soviet Union's Red Army during World War II. It was formed in January 1942 as the 110th Separate Cavalry Division and reformed as the 110th Cavalry Division on 30 September 1942. Formed as a Kalmyk national division, its personnel were drawn from the Kalmyk Autonomous Soviet Socialist Republic.

The division arrived on the frontlines on 14 May 1942, covering the retreat of Soviet troops across river Don during the 1942 German strategic summer offensive (Case Blue). After suffering heavy casualties, it broke down into separate units while continuing to fight in the Battle of the Caucasus. It was disbanded on 27 January 1943, after the Soviet Union began to dissolve national divisions. Unsubstantiated rumors surrounding its alleged misconduct during the war contributed to the decision to deport Kalmyks to Siberia.

== Formation ==
During the early stages of the German invasion of the Soviet Union during World War II, the latter suffered massive casualties. Over one hundred Soviet divisions were disbanded due to losses in manpower. The Soviet State Defense Committee initiated the formation of hundreds of new divisions which were quickly sent to the front lines. Losses of materiel among the tank divisions and mechanized corps, meant that horsed cavalry divisions remained the only tool available for the execution of deep operations and raids. On 13 November 1941, following the suggestion of General Inspector of the Cavalry Oka Gorodovikov, the Soviets began forming 20 national cavalry divisions and 15 national rifle brigades. The new units drew upon the peoples of the Autonomous Soviet Socialist Republics of the Soviet Union (ASSRs), in Northern Caucasus, Central Asia, the Urals and the Lower Volga Region. Unlike typical cavalry divisions, national cavalry divisions were equipped and sustained using the funds of the respective republics and their formation was overseen by the local communist party committees. Most officers were appointed from among the native nationality, in order to prevent the development of a language barrier.

On 20 November 1941, Deputy Defense Narkom Efim Shadenko ordered the Kalmyk Autonomous Soviet Socialist Republic to form the 110th and 111th Separate Cavalry Divisions by January 1942. Most Kalmyks had only recently transitioned to sedentism, severely limiting the number of settlements that could host the new divisions. The 3,498-man-strong 110th Separate S.M. Budyonny Cavalry Division was to be formed in the Sadovoe, Tundutovo and Malye Derbety villages. Men were drafted from Serpinsky, Ketchenerovsky, Maloderbetsky, Ustinsky, Privolzhsky, Ulan-Holsky and Lagansky Uluses (Districts), located in the north and east of the republic. Since the command staff had departed the republic for the front lines, the first temporary commander of the division was appointed by the local political authorities. Former head of the Kalmyk ASSR Selhozbank (Agricultural Bank), Lieutenant Michael Onguldushev assumed command. In January 1942, command was transferred to Colonel Vasily Panin. Mobilization and training lagged behind schedule since over 16,000 Kalmyks were employed in various engineering projects around the Caucasus. On 23 February, the 110th Separate Cavalry Division received its military banner and its soldiers took the military oath. On the same day its size was expanded to 4,494 men, while soldiers were assigned to their respective units within it. On 4 March, the Soviet High Command disbanded 20 cavalry divisions after deeming cavalry to be less effective than expected. The 111th Separate Cavalry Division was disbanded on 12 March, its best cadres and equipment being transferred to the 110th Separate Cavalry Division. The latter dispatched 1,000 of its least trained recruits to reserve units. At 20 April, the 110th was judged to be fully equipped, now numbering 4,579 men and 4,825 horses. The 273rd, 292nd and 311th Cavalry Regiments forming its core.

== Operations ==
=== Defense of the Don ===
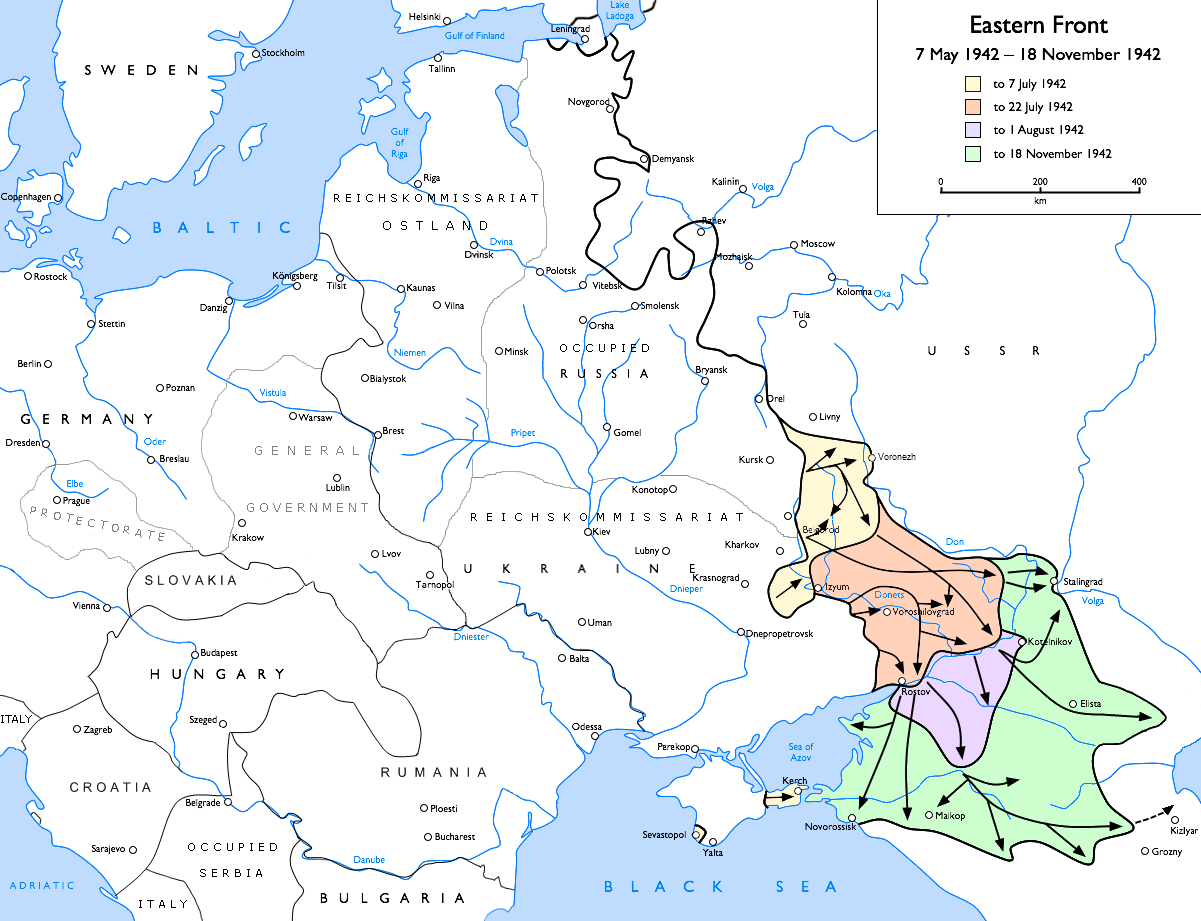
The German advance from 7 May to 18 November 1942. to 7 July to 22 July to 1 August to 18 November

On 14 May 1942, the 110th Separate Cavalry Division was deployed to Zimovniki, Rostov Oblast. On 26 May 1942, after marching for 328 kilometres (204 miles) the 110th Separate Cavalry Division reached the Don river village of Kuteynovskaya. After joining the 17th Cavalry Corps, the division continued its training. In June, the Germans reached the banks of the Don. The German Army Groups A and B were tasked with encircling and annihilating the Soviet troops crossing the river, capturing the Caucasus and seizing the city of Stalingrad in what came to be known as Case Blue, the 1942 German strategic summer offensive. This would deny the Soviet Union its strategic oil and gas reserves and block the Persian Corridor of the Allied Lend-Lease programme.

The Soviet North Caucasian Front responded by sending forward the 51st Army (which included the 110th Separate Cavalry Division) to the left bank of the Don. On 5 June, the 110th was assigned a 58-kilometre (36-mile) section of the front ranging from the Bagayevskaya to Semikarakorsk, while the 115th Cavalry Division protected a 15 kilometres (9.3 miles) stretch from Konstantinovka to Semikarakorsk on its northern flank. On 13 July, the Soviet High Command ordered all units remaining west of the Don to cross the river and concentrate at Stalingrad. The two divisions facilitated the retreat of those units, by providing anti-aircraft cover and collecting abandoned equipment. Between 16 and 27 July, 110th Separate Cavalry Division shot down five German aircraft using Maxim guns and rifle fire.

The 115th Cavalry Division came under a massed tank attack and was heavily bombed, retreating from its positions. On 18 July, the 110th withdrew to the Sal river, establishing its headquarters at Batlaevka. The same day its positions became the target of heavy aerial bombing and artillery fire, while its advanced guard exchanged fire with the enemy, losing five killed and seven wounded. On 20 July, it lost 50 killed and dozens wounded to aerial bombardments and strafing. On 21 July, the 273rd Cavalry Regiment ambushed a unit of motorcyclists and two armored cars in a vineyard in the outskirts of the Puchliakovskaya village. The Germans retreated after suffering casualties and launched a second attack which was beaten off. On the night of 21 July, the 311th Cavalry Regiment's Reconnaissance Platoon was attacked by elements of the Motorized Infantry Division Großdeutschland at Kerchik, losing half of its troops killed.

On the morning of 22 July, the II. and III. Grenadier Battalions of the Großdeutschland Division established a bridgehead on the southern bank of the Don at Puchliakovskaya and Melichovskaya which were abandoned by Soviet troops. Augmented by a tank company the I. Grenadier Battalion advanced on Razdorskaya village. The village and the nearby pontoon crossing was defended by the 3rd NKVD Battalion, the 1st Militsiya Battalion, two 45 mm guns and two anti-tank riflemen teams of the 273rd Cavalry Regiment. Anti-tank rifleman Sergeant Erdny Delikov opened fire at 150 metres (490 ft), destroying two tanks and one truck. The Germans received air support after firing flares, and the ensuing bombardment knocked out one of the 45 mm guns and both of the anti-tank rifles, mortally injuring Delikov. The delaying action at Razdorskaya enabled all retreating Soviet units in the vicinity to safely withdraw over the Don. On 31 March 1943, Delikov was posthumously awarded the title Hero of the Soviet Union, the first Kalmyk to receive the honor. By the end of the day, two out of the three river crossings located in the 110th Separate Cavalry Division's area of responsibility had fallen into enemy hands. The Bagaevskaya crossing remained intact, allowing the staff of the 37th Army, the 3rd Rifle Corps, 5th and 15th Tank Brigades and other smaller units to evade encirclement. On 22 July, the 110th was placed under the operational control of the 37th Army.

On 23 July, Großdeutschland's motorcycle battalion, supported by three tanks, three armored cars, eight armored personnel carriers (APCs) and two heavy artillery pieces launched an assault on Bagaevskaya. The 292nd Cavalry Regiment repelled the first attack with the aid of an artillery and mortar barrage. The Germans lost a tank, four APCs and two armored cars. At 15:30, the Germans attacked again after a series of airstrikes, but were thrown back to their starting positions. On 24 July, the Germans conducted another unsuccessful attack on Bagaevskaya, losing five APCs, two tanks and two artillery pieces. The 292nd Cavalry Regiment blew up the Bagaevskaya bridge at 12:00 a.m. Having lost 150 men killed and wounded and over 200 horses, the 292nd withdrew to the Susat-Karpovka line. On 25 July, the III Panzer Corps broke through Soviet defenses south of Konstantinovskaya, putting the 110th Separate Cavalry Division in danger of encirclement. On the night of 25/26 July, it began augmenting its fortifications at Karpovka. The following morning, the Germans struck Karpovka and Azhinov, although the 110th Separate Cavalry Division stubbornly resisted enemy attempts to advance. Hundreds of its soldiers were killed, including Divisional Commissar Sergei Zayarny and Division Chief of Staff Alexei Raab. The divisional headquarters building was destroyed, burying with it the divisional and the regimental flags, which were recovered under intense enemy fire. The division conducted an organized retreat over the Manych river during the night.

During the two weeks of fighting on the Don, the 110th Separate Cavalry Division lost approximately 1,000 men killed or missing in action and 700 wounded. According to Russian historian Vladimir Ubushaev, it managed to destroy up to four battalions of motorized infantry, 30 tanks, 55 armored cars, 45 mortars, 20 artillery pieces, 40 machine guns. In total, the 110th Separate Cavalry Division's delaying actions on the Don enabled over 425,000 men, 215 tanks, 1,300 artillery pieces, over 8,000 tractors and cars, 22,000 horses and other equipment to be safely transported to the Soviet rear.

=== Battle of the Caucasus ===
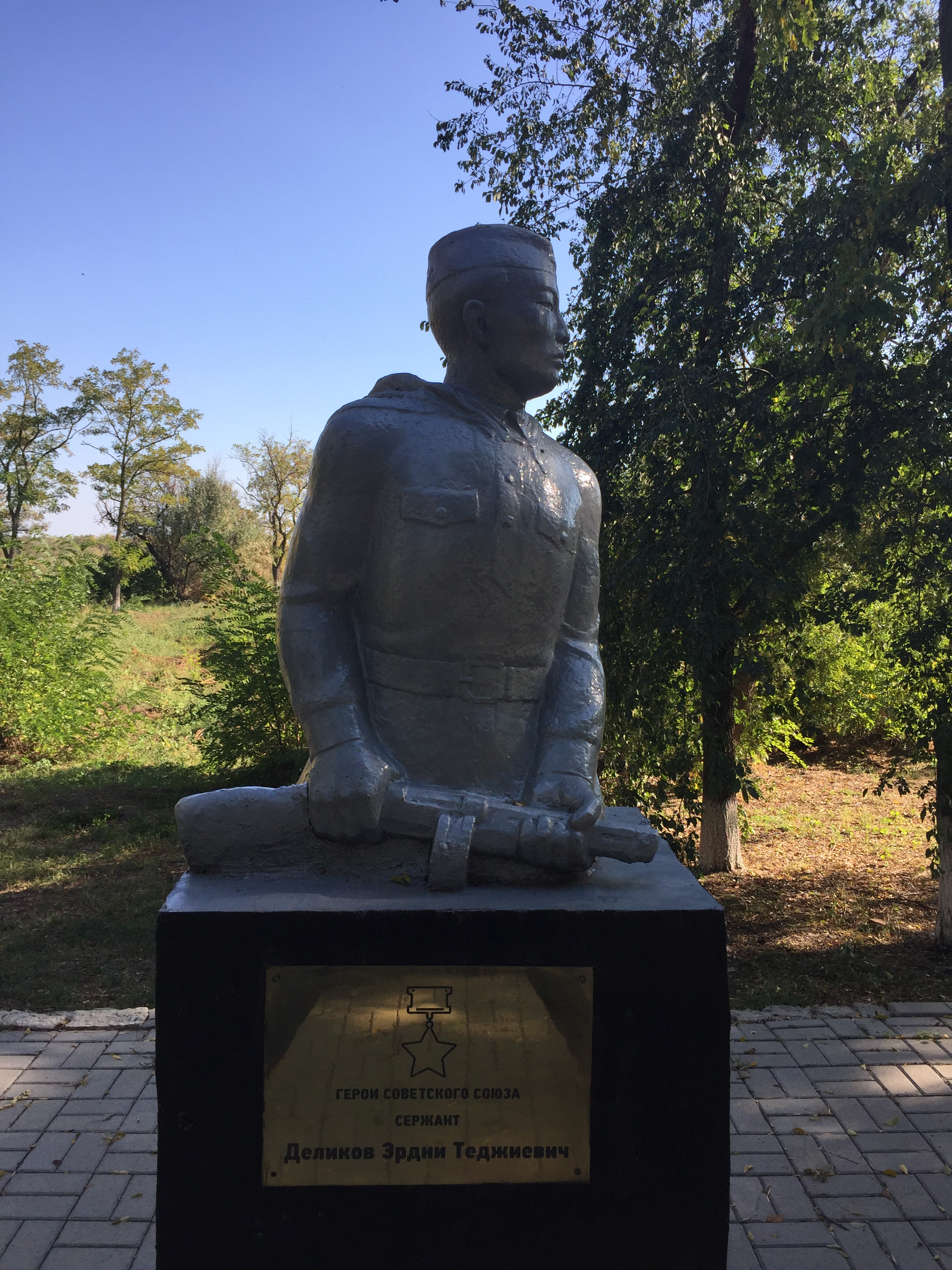
Monument to Erdni Delikov in Razdorskaya village

Between 27 and 29 July, the 110th fought a series of defensive battles around Tuzlukov, Krasniy and Veseliy in the vicinity of the Manych. Having suffered heavy casualties it withdrew under the orders of the 37th Army commander. Unable to build an adequate distance from German motorized troops to regroup and suffering losses as a result of German air supremacy it made a fighting retreat to Mozdok. The unit broke into numerous columns in order to minimize casualties; the bulk of its forces marched through Bashanta and Voroshilovsk. It clashed with enemy troops at Salsk, Sandata, Sablino and north-east of Voroshilovsk. In the middle of August, a part of the division took up defense positions at Voznesenskaya outside Mozdok, while a smaller group retreated to Maykop and Astrakhan. In the Northern Caucasus elements of the 110th merged into the 4th Guards Cavalry Corps, while in Astrakhan they came under the control of the 28th Army. The core of the division, stationed at Voznesenskaya, became an independent unit within the Northern Army Group of the Transcaucasian Front.

By the beginning of September, the division had lost over 3,000 men killed and wounded, as well as 80% of its horses. On 5 September, the Military Committee of the Northern Army Group ordered the 110th's commander Colonel Vladimir Homutnikov to protect the newly built Kizlyar–Astrakhan railway. The division thus came under the control of the 44th Army. The division's sector of responsibility extended from the Cherniy Runok to the Zenzeli station in their native Kalmyk ASSR. The Germans attempted to disrupt the railway's operation by attacking the Ulan Hol station with a motorized infantry battalion and 10 tanks. A counterattack by the 292nd Cavalry Regiment cost the Germans 100 men killed, two tanks and three trucks. The 110th later marched 500 kilometres (310 miles) to Aga-Batyr north-east of Mozdok, where it helped the 36th Cavalry Division avoid encirclement. After 15 days of continuous fighting, the division liberated Terekli-Mekteb, Achikulak, Aga-Batyr, Tarskiy, Michailovskiy, Poltavskiy and Sovkhoz "Mozdokskiy".

On 16 September, the division was reinforced by a group of Kalmyk cadets from the Novocherkassk Cavalry School. On 30 September, the 110th Separate Cavalry Division was officially disbanded. It was simultaneously reformed as the 110th Cavalry Division, drawing personnel from the Ordzhonikidze Krai and the unoccupied Uluses of the Kalmyk ASSR. The reformation dragged on as all available motor transport and horses in the Kalmyk ASSR had already been requisitioned. By the middle of November, the division's strength reached 2,719 men, only 30% of whom were Kalmyks. On 12 December, the division was incorporated into the 4th Guards Cavalry Corps, taking part in the fighting around Terekli-Mekteb. On 1 January 1943, the Northern Army Group of the Transcaucasian Front launched a counter-offensive. On 4 January, the 110th breached enemy lines at Achikulak. On 10 January, the division annihilated the defenders of the Orlovskaya and Praskovey fortified positions, capturing Budyonnovsk. Continuing its push, it covered the right flank of the 4th Guards Cavalry Corps. In the process, the division seized dozens of villages in the Ordzhonikidze Krai, Dagestan ASSR and Rostov Oblast, as well as the Zapadniy and Yashaltinskiy Uluses.

In late January 1943, the Soviet Union began reorganizing its divisions. Recruitment based on ethnicity was deemed to be too logistically complex and many national divisions were disbanded. On 27 January, the 110th Cavalry Division was disbanded and its personnel were split between various units within the 4th Guards Cavalry Corps.

== Accusations of collaboration ==
As early as the division's withdrawal from the Don, rumors began to spread that its personnel had turned to banditry, fled in the face of the enemy or outright defected. In November 1942, Kalmyk ASSR Communist Party First Secretary P. Lavrentiev sent Shadenko a series of letters accusing the staff of the 51st Army of spreading baseless and malicious rumors about the division. The rumors had an immediate effect on the treatment of ethnic Kalmyks by the Soviet military. Individual commanders within the 51st and 28th Armies attempted to deport Kalmyk civilians from a 25-kilometre (16-mile) zone around the frontlines. Ethnic Kalmyks were likewise blamed for not evacuating their cattle in time and defecting into the collaborationist Kalmykian Cavalry Corps. The latter was formed in Germany during the spring of 1943 from Kalmyk men taken by the Germans as forced laborers and defectors among prisoners of war.

Marshal of the Soviet Union Georgy Zhukov later cited reports about the alleged disintegration of the 110th Cavalry Division coming from the 37th and 51st Armies during a session of the State Defense Committee. Those reports are believed to have served as the catalyst behind 27 December 1943 decision to deport Kalmyks to Siberia. Former soldiers of the 110th Cavalry Division were among the Kalmyks recalled from active service and deported to Siberia. Many of whom died in special settlements. A report issued by NKVD officer A. Leontiev accused the division of turning to banditry en masse and spreading defeatist rumors in their native republic. While there are records of a limited number of defections among the 110th Cavalry Division, both modern and Soviet historiography consider the accusations leveled against the division a myth.

== Commanders ==
The division was commanded by the following commanders:

- Colonel Vasily Panin (January 1942 – 18 August 1942)
- Lieutenant Colonel Alexander Lisitsyn (18 August – 27 August 1942)
- Colonel Vladimir Homutnikov (28 August – 18 September 1942)
- Colonel Ivan Terentiev (18 September – 29 September 1942)
- Colonel Vladimir Homutnikov (30 September 1942 – 28 January 1943)

== Composition ==
The division included the following units:

- 273rd Cavalry Regiment
- 292nd Cavalry Regiment
- 311th Cavalry Regiment
- 110th Separate Horse-Artillery Divizion
- 99th Separate Artillery Park
- 81st Separate Communications Half-Squadron
- 110th Separate Chemical Protection Squadron
- Separate Anti-Aircraft Battery
- 94th Medical-Sanitary Squadron
- 82nd Supply Train
- 374th Veterinary Hospital
- Editorial and Printing House
- Military Prosecutor's Office
- Military Tribunal
- Special Department
- Separate Rifle Platoon OO
- 1925th Field Post Office
- 1028th Field Cash Office of the State Bank
