= Hmayak Babayan =

Soviet Armenian major general (1901–1945)

- Born: 15 August 1901; Zykhchi, Kars Oblast, Russian Empire
- Died: 21 April 1945 (aged 43) Malchow, Lichtenberg, Berlin, Germany
- Buried: Myślibórz, Poland
- Allegiance: Russian Empire; First Armenian Republic; Soviet Union
- Branch: Imperial Russian Army; Army of the First Armenian Republic; Red Army
- Service years: 1917–1945
- Rank: Major general
- Commands: 390th Rifle Division; 76th Rifle Division; 338th Rifle Division; 35th Mechanized Brigade
- Conflicts: World War I; Russian Civil War; World War II
- Awards: Hero of the Soviet Union; Order of Lenin; Order of the Red Banner (2); Order of Kutuzov, 2nd class; Order of the Patriotic War, 1st class

Hmayak Grigoryevich Babayan (Russian: Амаяк Григорьевич Бабаян; Armenian: Հմայակ Գրիգորի Բաբայան; 15 August 1901 – 21 April 1945) was an Armenian Red Army major general and a Hero of the Soviet Union.

Born to a peasant family in modern-day eastern Turkey, Babayan joined the Imperial Russian Army in 1917, fighting in the Caucasus Campaign. After the collapse of the Imperial Russian Army, he became a soldier in the army of the First Republic of Armenia. After the Soviet occupation of Armenia, Babayan joined the Red Army, in which he became an officer. Stationed in Belarus before the German invasion of the Soviet Union, he was wounded twice in the first months of the war. Commanding a regiment during the Battle of Moscow in December 1941, Babayan was seriously wounded. After recovering, he took command of the 390th Rifle Division, fighting in Crimea, which was destroyed in May 1942. Babayan was seriously wounded in Crimea and evacuated.

In March 1943, he was given command of a rifle brigade, which was soon converted into the 76th Rifle Division, which he led during the Battle of Smolensk in the summer and early fall of 1943. Babayan was seriously wounded a third time during the battle, and after recovering took command of the 338th Rifle Division in spring 1944. He led the 338th in Operation Bagration and the Kaunas Offensive during the summer of 1944, but was relieved of command later that year. Babayan took command of the a brigade in the 1st Mechanized Corps in February 1945, which he led in the Vistula–Oder Offensive, the East Pomeranian Offensive, and the Battle of Berlin. Babayan was killed in action during the Battle of Berlin while personally leading an attack and posthumously awarded the title Hero of the Soviet Union.

== Early life and military service ==
Babayan was born on 15 August 1901 in the village of Zykhchi in Kars Oblast (now in Turkey) to an Armenian peasant family. He graduated from junior high school in 1916. In 1917, he volunteered for the Imperial Russian Army, fighting in the Caucasus Campaign against Turkish troops. After the collapse of the Imperial Army, he joined the army of the Armenian National Council, fighting in the Battle of Sardarabad in late May 1918, during which the Ottoman invasion of Armenia was repulsed. After Sardarabad, the First Republic of Armenia was proclaimed and Babayan joined the new army of the republic, serving with the 2nd Rifle Regiment at Vagharshapat. In May 1920 he deserted and returned to his homeland. After the Soviet occupation of Armenia in on 29 November, Babayan joined the Red Army's Voronovich Special Detachment in the village of Kanaker, later serving as a Red Army man with the 4th Lori Armenian Rifle Regiment. With the regiment, which became part of the 20th Rifle Division of the 11th Army, he fought in battles on the Caucasian Front, in the overthrow of the Democratic Republic of Georgia, and the suppression of the Dashnak revolt in Armenia.

== Interwar period ==
Between 1 March 1921 and 27 February 1923, Babayan studied at the divisional training school. After graduation, he served as a starshina in a company of the 1st Armenian Rifle Regiment of the 76th Rifle Division. In December of that year, he was sent to command courses at the Armenian Combined Military School, becoming a platoon commander in the 76th Division's 3rd Armenian Territorial Rifle Regiment after his graduation in October 1924. Between November 1926 and August 1928, Babayan studied at the Kiev Command School, becoming a platoon commander in the 2nd Armenian Rifle Regiment after graduation. From December 1931, he served as a company commander in the 4th Armenian Rifle Regiment. Babayan transferred to the 2nd Armenian Rifle Regiment in January 1935, serving as deputy chief and chief of material and clothing supply. He was appointed chief of the school for junior specialists of the Transcaucasian Military District's 227th Armenian Mountain Rifle Regiment in September 1937.

In June 1938, Babayan was transferred to serve in the same position with the 85th Rifle Regiment of the 100th Rifle Division, part of the Belorussian Special Military District in Minsk. He became assistant commander of the regiment for drill in November. In August 1939, Babayan, now a major, was appointed commander of the newly formed 383rd Rifle Regiment of the 121st Rifle Division, stationed in Rogachev. He led the regiment in the Soviet invasion of Poland, during which it advanced into regions annexed to the Soviet Union as Western Belorussia.

== World War II ==
Babayan fought in World War II from the beginning of the German invasion of the Soviet Union on 22 June 1941. He fought in the Battle of Białystok–Minsk and the defenses of Białystok, Baranovichi, and Volkovysk, among others, and was wounded on 25 July and 23 August during the Battle of Smolensk. In September, he became commander of the guard regiment of the headquarters of the Bryansk Front, and in October was appointed commander of the 654th Rifle Regiment of the 148th Rifle Division. He led the regiment during the Battle of Moscow in operations to recapture Yelets. He personally led the regiment in the 7 December recapture of the village of Olshanets, during which the regiment was reported by Soviet sources to have killed up to 300 German soldiers. On 9 December, during the recapture of Yelets, Babayan fought with forward units of the regiment in street fighting, during which they were reported to have killed up to 500 German soldiers and captured many trophies, among which there were 15 vehicles. After the capture of the city, he led the regiment in the attack on the village of Kazaky, during which they were reported by Soviet sources to have killed up to 200 German soldiers and captured ammunition. On 11 December, during the attack on Afanasievo, Babayan was severely wounded, but refused evacuation until the village was captured. For his actions, Babayan was awarded the Order of the Red Banner on 21 February 1942. After leaving hospital on 11 February, he became commander of the 158th Cadet Rifle Brigade in the Moscow Military District, which he continued to command when it was transferred to the Northwestern Front.

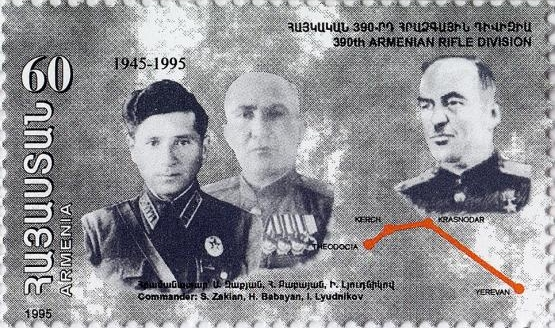
Babayan (center) on an Armenian stamp depicting commanders of the 390th Rifle Division

Babayan was next sent to the Crimea, where he took command of the 390th Rifle Division on 19 April. The division was defending positions on the Isthmus of Ak-Monay in the Kerch Peninsula and was virtually destroyed during the May German counteroffensive, Operation Bustard Hunt. During the latter, Babayan was seriously wounded in fighting for the village of Mikhailovka near Kerch on 13 May and evacuated across the Kerch Strait to the Taman Peninsula. After recovering by October, he was appointed commander of the 27th Separate Ski Brigade in the Siberian Military District. After the brigade was sent to the Northwestern Front in March 1943, Babayan became commander of the 87th Separate Rifle Brigade on 1 April.

This assignment proved brief as he became commander of the 76th Rifle Division, forming in the Moscow Military District, on 20 April. The division joined the 21st Army of the Western Front on 15 July and fought in the Yelnya–Dorogobuzh Offensive. Distinguishing itself in the capture of Yelnya on 30 August, the 76th received the name of that city as an honorific, but on 15 September Babayan was severely wounded for the third time. He was treated in a hospital in Yaroslavl and upon recovery in January 1944 was sent to the Voroshilov Higher Military Academy for an accelerated course that he entered on 30 January, graduating on 23 March.

Returning to the Western Front for a division command, Babayan led the 338th Rifle Division from 29 March. The 338th held defensive positions southeast of Vitebsk as part of the 5th Army, and from 23 June fought in the Vitebsk–Orsha and the Vilnius Offensives during Operation Bagration, participating in the capture of Vilnius and thrice crossing the Viliya. It crossed the Neman near Puni and established a bridgehead on the opposite bank. Sent back to the east bank of the river, the division recrossed the Neman between 22 and 23 July near Proni south of Kaunas and until 29 July fought in fierce fighting to retain its bridgehead. In the subsequent Kaunas Offensive, the 338th moved westward and broke through German defenses, then turned north on 16 August and attacked at Šakiai. For its crossings of the Neman, the division received the name of the river as an honorific on 12 August. It attacked again on 5 October as part of the 39th Army in the Memel Offensive, but on 25 October Babayan was relieved of command and placed at the disposal of the military council of the 3rd Belorussian Front.

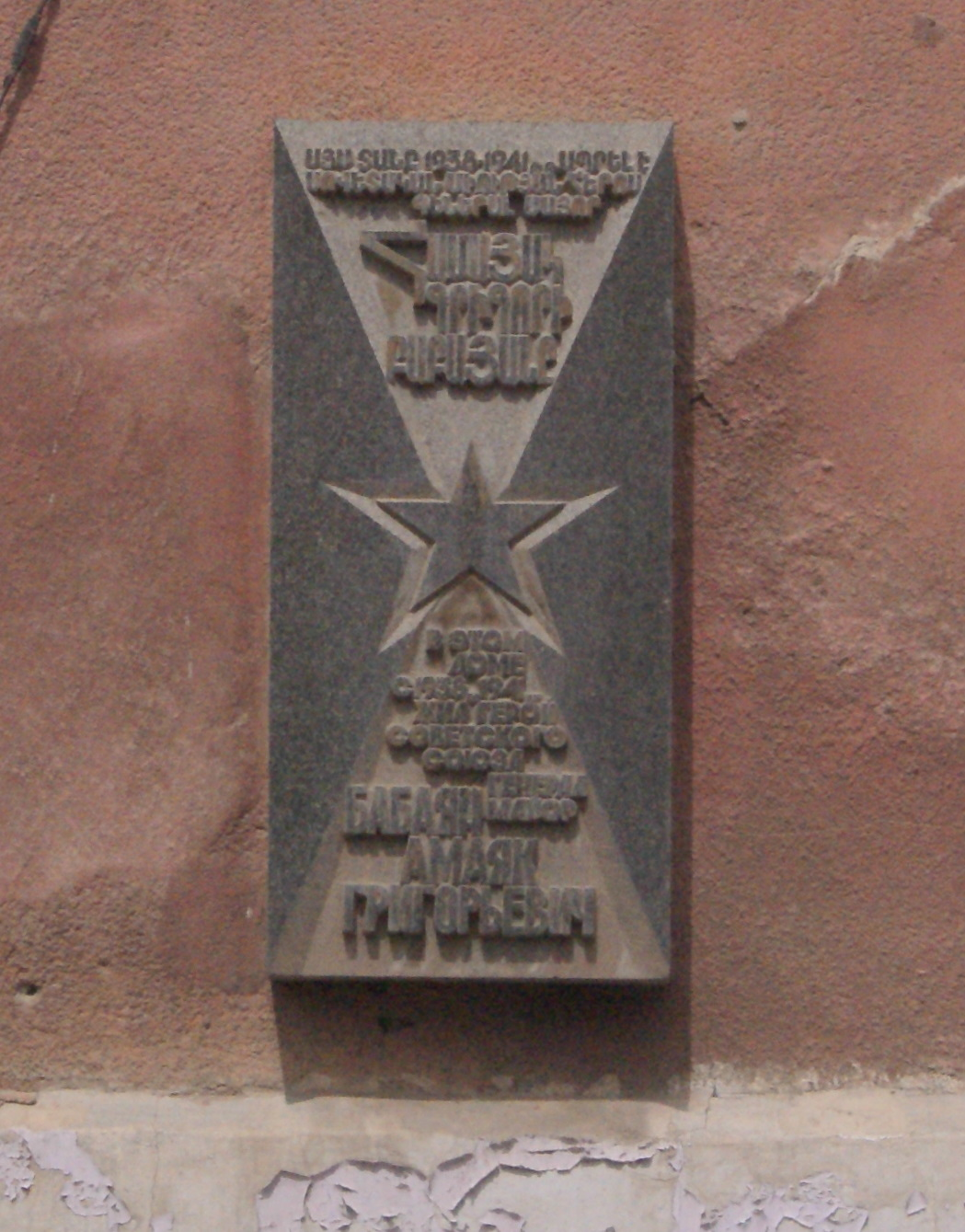
Plaque for Hmayak Babayan in Yerevan

Hospitalized between 2 December and 12 January 1945, Babayan was placed at the disposal of the 1st Belorussian Front and on 19 February took command of the 35th Mechanized Brigade of the front's 1st Mechanized Corps, part of the 2nd Guards Tank Army. He led the brigade in the East Pomeranian Offensive and the Berlin Offensive. On 21 April, during an attack on Malchow on the outskirts of Berlin that he personally led, Babayan's tank was set ablaze by a German panzerfaust. Abandoning the tank, with submachine gun in hand Babayan led infantry supporting the brigade in an attack against opposing German infantry that were stopping the advance of the unit, and was killed in the resulting action. He was buried in Soldin (now Myślibórz). For his actions, Babyan was posthumously awarded the title Hero of the Soviet Union and the Order of Lenin on 31 May.
