= 390th Rifle Division =

Soviet WWII infantry division

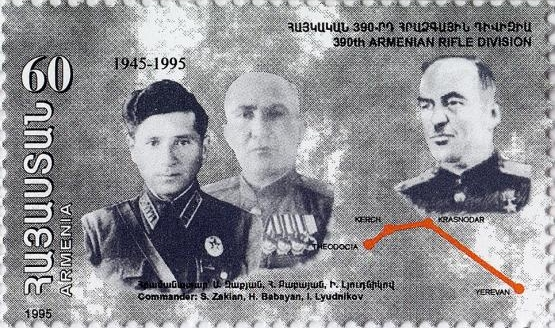
- Armenian stamp of 1995 honoring the division's first formation
- Active: 1st formation: August 1941 – June 1942; 2nd formation: November 1944 – late 1945
- Country: Soviet Union
- Branch: Red Army
- Type: Rifle division
- Engagements: World War II; 1st formation: Battle of the Kerch Peninsula; 2nd formation: Soviet invasion of Manchuria

Commanders
- Notable commanders: Ivan Lyudnikov; Hmayak Babayan

The 390th Rifle Division (Russian: 390-я стрелковая дивизия) was an infantry division of the Soviet Union's Red Army during World War II. It was formed twice, first in August 1941, and after its destruction in 1942, re-formed in 1944.

The division landed in eastern Crimea as part of the 51st Army during the Kerch–Feodosiya landing operation, which occurred in late-December 1941 and set off the Battle of the Kerch Peninsula. The landing operation sought to relieve Soviet forces trapped in Sevastopol in southwestern Crimea, but a German counterattack in mid-January forced the Soviets, including the 390th division, to retreat eastward; they eventually were cornered in the Kerch Peninsula. As a result of language problems due to lack of Russian speakers in the division, the 390th was made into an Armenian national division in February and given an Armenian commander. The division was destroyed in the final German offensive, Operation Bustard Hunt, in May, and officially disbanded soon afterwards.

The division was reformed in the Far East in November 1944 and fought in the Soviet invasion of Manchuria before being disbanded postwar in late 1945.

== First formation ==
=== Formation ===
The division began formation as part of the Transcaucasian Front on 19 August 1941, under the command of Colonel Ivan Vinogradov at Makharadze. Out of 10,252 soldiers in the division at its inception, 8,979 had never handled weapons. Most of its troops could not speak or understand Russian. The enlisted personnel of the 390th were mostly Armenian and Azerbaijani peasants, while junior and political officers were Russian and Georgian. On 23 November, it joined the 51st Army, and by early December the division command post was located at Taman on the coast of the Kerch Strait.

=== Kerch landing ===
In December 1941 and January 1942, the division and the rest of the 51st Army fought in the Kerch–Feodosiya landing operation, which began the Battle of the Kerch Peninsula, an attempt to relieve the trapped Soviet garrison at Sevastopol. After the 44th Army finished landing on 31 December, the 51st Army began crossing over the frozen Kerch Strait. Both the 44th and 51st Armies were slated to commence an offensive on 16 January, which was expected to relieve Sevastopol and recapture the whole of Crimea. However, weather conditions thawed the ice and hindered the buildup of supplies between 6 and 9 January, resulting in the cancellation of the offensive. German troops launched a counterattack at the junction of the 51st and 44th Armies on 15 January. Positioned on the 51st's left flank, the 390th saw the heaviest fighting, but held against the German attack. However, the attack forced the 44th Army to retreat and Feodosiya was recaptured by the German troops. On the morning of 16 January, the division began its own counterattack and threw the German troops back 1.5 to 2 kilometers (0.93 to 1.24 mi). The 51st Army slowly gave ground over the next two days and by 18 January was holding a line along the Isthmus of Ak-Monay in conjunction with the 44th Army.

=== Operations in February and March 1942 ===
In February, the 390th Rifle Division became an Armenian national division as part of an attempt to overcome the language barrier, as the majority of its troops still could not speak Russian fluently. As a result of mass desertions of the Caucasian troops during the previous fighting, the Armenian officer Colonel Simon Zakian replaced Vinogradov as commander of the division on 24 February. The 51st Army launched an attack on 16 March, with the 390th and 398th Rifle Divisions in reserve. On the night of 17–18 March, the 390th and 398th were moved up to their jumping-off positions in the area of Korpech village. The attacks of the two divisions began at 10:00 on 18 March, and the 390th, advancing in conjunction with the 55th Tank Brigade, overcame German resistance and captured two trench lines of the German main defensive line. By the end of the day, they had dug in on the new positions. On the morning of 19 March, Zakian committed his reserve, the 784th Rifle Regiment, into the battle. However, the rest of the attacks were unsuccessful. After army commander Vladimir Lvov received reports of a German buildup, the offensive was halted.

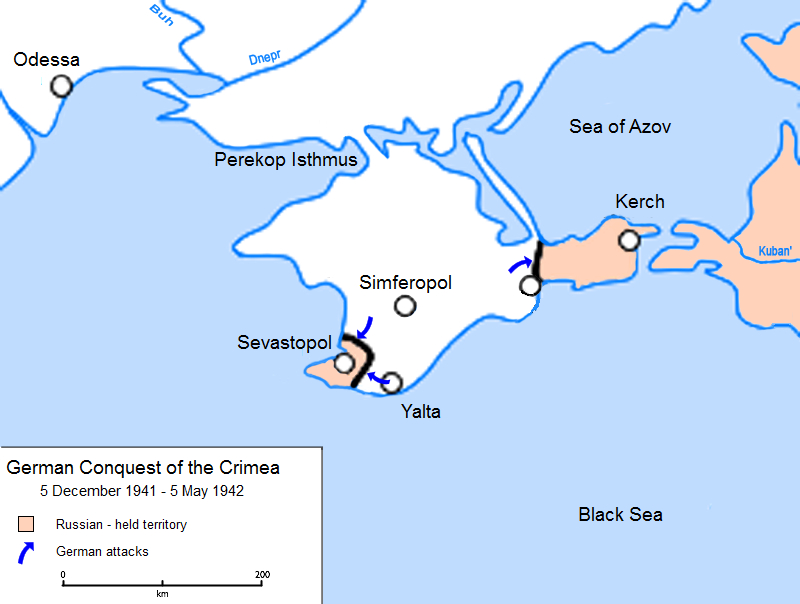
Map of the Battle of the Kerch Peninsula

On 20 March, the Germans counterattacked with the 22nd Panzer Division, which had recently arrived in Crimea, and took the Soviet defenses by surprise in the early morning fog. They attempted to eliminate the penetration that the 390th and 398th Rifle Divisions had made into their lines and break through the hastily prepared forward defenses of the 51st Army. Parts of the 390th began to retreat towards Height 28.2, but the situation was restored by the personal intervention of the 143rd Rifle Brigade's commander, Lieutenant Colonel Georgy Kurashvili, who rallied the troops to defend Korpech. Major Mushegh Malkhasyan's 789th Rifle Regiment was the first hit by the German tank attack, but the regiment was able to separate the German tanks from their infantry and break up the counterattack. Major L.G. Akopov's 792nd Regiment also participated in heavy fighting against the German attack. German tanks, supported by a company of infantry, broke through the 390th's line and attacked the divisional command post, forcing Zakian and his chief of staff to lead rear units in a counterattack. The German assault was eventually repulsed, and Soviet sources claim 17 tanks were destroyed. A second attack against the 398th Division followed but also failed. The Germans then followed up with a more powerful assault at the junction of the 390th and the 83rd Marine Rifle Brigade on the division's right flank. This third German assault was repulsed by Soviet anti-tank fire.

From 26 to 29 March, the division's 789th Regiment and the 143rd Rifle Brigade, with tank support, attacked the German strongpoint of Koy-Asan. The 789th advanced two kilometers, entered Koy-Asan, and opened fire on the railroad bridge. However, the Soviet troops were unable to completely take the strong point. On 31 March, Lvov ordered the army to transition to echeloned defense, and the 390th was placed in the rear echelon. Around this time, Zakian was mortally wounded by a shell fragment at his command post, and died on 2 April. Colonel Ivan Lyudnikov took command on 1 April, and seventeen days later was replaced by Colonel Hmayak Babayan. In late April the Chairman of the Presidium of the Armenian SSR Supreme Soviet, Matsak Papian, presented the division with a battle flag. Around this time, at the insistence of the Crimean Front commissar Lev Mekhlis, all troops were concentrated into one single defensive line with few reserves.

=== Operation Bustard Hunt ===
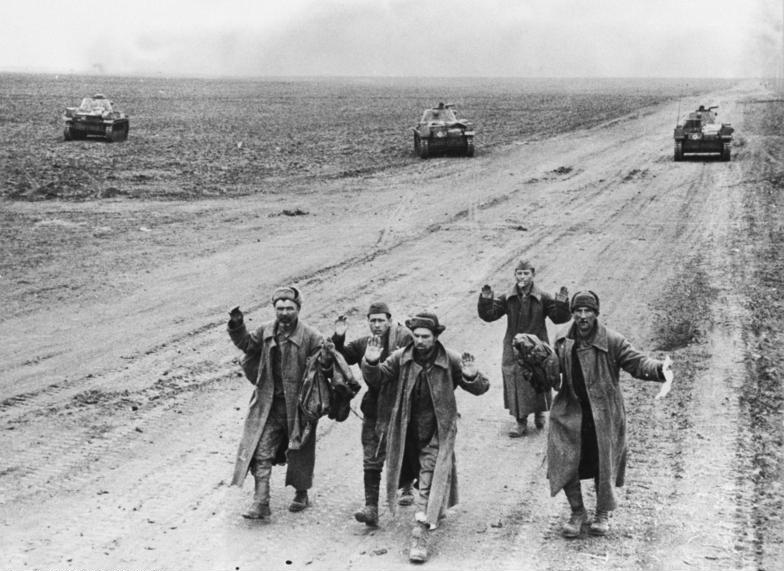
Soviet prisoners of war after Operation Bustard Hunt with three German tanks in the background

On 8 May, after days of heavy aerial bombardment, the final German offensive in the Kerch Peninsula, Operation Bustard Hunt, began. The 44th Army quickly collapsed, and the 51st Army was forced to fight off frontal attacks while also defending its open left flank. The 390th, in reserve, was sent into battle at Arma-Eli, and its 789th Regiment delayed the German advance, gaining time for the rest of the division to set up a defensive line in preparation for a counterattack. However, Lvov and his command staff were killed in an airstrike on the army headquarters, and no counterattack took place. Furthermore, on 13 May, division commander Babayan was wounded and evacuated, further diminishing the army leadership. By 14 May the German advance reached the shores of Kerch Bay, cutting off the troops retreating towards Eltigen and Kamysh-Burun. At this point, the 789th Regiment, now commanded by its commissar, S. Sargsyan, launched a counterattack, throwing the German troops back on the slopes of Mount Mithridat. For three days the regiment, suffering heavy casualties, held its positions and delayed the German advance. However, German troops advanced into Kerch from the southwest and the situation became hopeless. Upon orders from the Crimean Front command, from 14 to 20 May, the 51st Army covered the evacuation of the troops. The remnants of the division were among those evacuated across the Kerch Strait, but the fighting left the division nearly destroyed. It was officially disbanded on 14 June 1942, along with other divisions destroyed in Crimea, and its survivors were used to provide the experienced core of new formations.

== Second formation ==
The division began re-forming from a cadre of rifle brigades on 22 November 1944 as part of the Far Eastern Front, commanded by Colonel Ivan Teplyakov. The division fought in the Sungari Offensive, part of the Soviet invasion of Manchuria, which began on 9 August following the Soviet declaration of war on Japan after the American Atomic bombings of Hiroshima and Nagasaki. The division advanced as part of the 5th Separate Rifle Corps (an independent unit reporting directly to the front command) on the left of the 15th Army, with the objective of taking the towns of Raohe, Baoqing, and Boli in eastern Manchukuo, a Japanese puppet state in Manchuria in northeast China. Attacking alongside the 172nd Tank Brigade, the division crossed the Amur River and captured Raohe and its fortified area from troops of the Japanese 135th Infantry Division on 10 August. The division and its parent corps then advanced southwest towards Baoqing, which was taken by the 172nd Brigade on 14 August. On 19 August, the corps linked up with troops of the 35th Army at Boli. After reaching Boli the corps' role in the fighting was effectively over, as Japanese resistance in Manchuria collapsed. The division was disbanded in late 1945 along with its corps in the Far Eastern Military District.

== Commanders ==
The division's first formation was commanded by the following commanders:

- Colonel Ivan Vinogradov (19 August 1941 – 23 February 1942)
- Colonel Simon Zakian (24 February – c. 31 March 1942)
- Colonel Ivan Lyudnikov (1 April – 18 April 1942)
- Colonel Hmayak Babayan (19 April – 14 June 1942)

The division's second formation was commanded by the following officer:

- Colonel Ivan Teplyakov (22 November 1944 – 3 September 1945)

== Composition ==
The division's first formation included the following units:

- 784th Rifle Regiment
- 789th Rifle Regiment
- 792nd Rifle Regiment
- 954th Artillery Regiment
- 147th Separate Destroyer Anti-Tank Battalion
- 182nd Anti-Aircraft Artillery Battery (formerly 678th Separate Anti-Aircraft Artillery Battalion)
- 678th Mortar Battalion
- 453rd Reconnaissance Company
- 672nd Sapper Battalion
- 842nd Separate Communications Battalion
- 476th Medical-Sanitary Battalion
- 469th Separate Chemical Defense Company
- 506th Auto-Transport Company
- 814th Field Bakery (formerly 241st Mobile Field Bakery)
- 816th Divisional Veterinary Hospital
- 1449th Field Post Office
- 720th Field Cash Office of the State Bank

The division's second formation included the following units:

- 425th Rifle Regiment
- 513th Rifle Regiment
- 554th Rifle Regiment
- 1042nd Artillery Regiment
- 475th Separate Self-Propelled Artillery Battalion
- 424th Separate Destroyer Anti-Tank Battalion
- 106th Reconnaissance Company
- 244th Sapper Battalion
- 1025th Separate Communications Battalion
- 354th Medical-Sanitary Battalion
- 233rd Separate Chemical Defense Company
- 716th Auto-Transport Company
- 612th Field Bakery
- 469th Divisional Veterinary Hospital
- 3157th Field Post Office
- 2001st Field Cash Office of the State Bank
