= 394th Rifle Division =

Military unit

394th Rifle Division (19 August 1941 – 1 October 1945)
- Active: 1941 - 1945
- Country: Soviet Union
- Branch: Red Army
- Type: Division
- Role: Infantry
- Engagements: Battle of the Caucasus; Donbass Strategic Offensive (August 1943); Battle of the Dniepr; Nikopol–Krivoi Rog Offensive; First Jassy-Kishinev Offensive; Second Jassy-Kishinev Offensive
- Decorations: Order of the Red Banner
- Battle honours: Krivoi Rog

Commanders
- Notable commanders: Col. Valerian Sergeevich Dzabakhidze; Col. Semyon Pavlovich Storozhilov; Col. Timofei Ivanovich Volkovich; Lt. Col. Ivan Georgievich Kantariya; Col. Pavel Ivanovich Belekhov; Maj. Gen. Aleksandr Ivanovich Lisitsyn; Col. Ilya Samsonovich Titov

The 394th Rifle Division was an infantry division of the Red Army 1941-45. It was formed in August in the Transcaucasus Military District as a Georgian National division. It saw its first action in August 1942 with 46th Army in the Battle of the Caucasus, blocking some of the passes of the High Caucasus against the advance of the German Army Group A. Following the German retreat in the winter of 1943, the division was assigned to Southwestern Front (after 20 October the 3rd Ukrainian Front) in 46th Army until August 1944, winning a battle honor and the Order of the Red Banner on the way. At the end of that year it was assigned to the 37th Army, which was detached from the Front to serve as a garrison unit in the Balkans after the German forces were driven north into Hungary. It remained in this relatively inactive role for the duration of the war, being disbanded shortly thereafter.

== Formation ==
The 394th began forming on 19 August 1941 at Tiflis in the Transcaucasus Military District, Its order of battle, based on the first wartime shtat (table of organization and equipment) for rifle divisions, was as follows:

- 808th Rifle Regiment
- 810th Rifle Regiment
- 815th Rifle Regiment
- 956th Artillery Regiment
- 165th Antitank Battalion
- 455th Reconnaissance Company
- 674th Sapper Battalion
- 844th Signal Battalion (later 1447th Signal Company)
- 478th Medical/Sanitation Battalion
- 471st Chemical Protection (Anti-gas) Company
- 508th Motor Transport Company
- 243rd Field Bakery
- 818th Divisional Veterinary Hospital
- 1451st Field Postal Station
- 723rd Field Office of the State Bank

Col. Valerian Sergeevich Dzabakhidze was assigned to command of the division on the day it formed, but he was replaced on 2 September by Col. Semyon Pavlovich Storozhilov. Shortly after it began forming its personnel were noted as being mostly Georgian. By the beginning of September it was assigned to the 47th Army on the borders of Turkey and Iran, but as it was still forming it did not take part in the Anglo-Soviet invasion of Iran. In December it was reassigned to the 46th Army in the same area. On 15 March 1942, Colonel Storozhilov handed his command to Col. Timofei Ivanovich Volkovich. In yet another change in command, on 23 July Colonel Volkovich was succeeded by Lt. Col. Ivan Georgievich Kantariya. In August the division moved with its Army into the Caucasus region to face the German and Romanian forces that were advancing there as part of Operation Blue.

== Battle of the Caucasus ==
This move brought 46th Army under command of the North Caucasus Front. At this time the 46th Army consisted of the 3rd Mountain Rifle Corps, the 389th, 392nd, 394th and 406th Rifle Divisions, a rifle brigade, the 63rd Cavalry Division, a fortified region and a single battalion of tanks. On 16 August the German XXXXIX Mountain Corps took the Front commander, Marshal S. M. Budyonny, by surprise with sudden thrust into the High Caucasus mountains. By the end of the day some of the leading Axis troops had reached Klukhori Pass, which was defended by just two companies of the 1st Battalion of 815th Rifle Regiment. This advance threatened the road to the port of Sukhumi and, by extension, the entire Soviet defense of the Black Sea coast north of that port. The two companies, untrained in mountain warfare and with only meagre defenses, were pushed back.

In reaction, 46th Army reinforced its defenses west of Klukhori Pass with the 3rd Battalion of the 815th Regiment, the division's training battalion, detachments from the Sukhumi Infantry School and the 7th NKVD Rifle Division. These reached the area on 22 August, in time to halt the German advance 10–12 km (6.2–7.5 mi) west of the pass. However, as they were not strong enough to drive them back, by the 26th they were further reinforced with the 3rd Battalion of the 810th Rifle Regiment and a regiment of the 9th Mountain Rifle Division. The combined force stymied further efforts by the German 1st Mountain Division to advance, but its own counterattacks failed due to faulty tactics. In a reorganization on 29 August the division was also given responsibility for the defense of Marukh Pass. On 5 September two battalions of the German division assaulted elements of the 808th and 810th Regiments and seized the pass two days later. In response the Front reinforced the regiments with three battalions from the 155th and 107th Rifle Brigades and the 2nd Tbilisi Infantry School. Counterattacks by these forces, which began on 9 September and continued well into October, failed to retake the pass. Farther west, two battalions of the German 4th Mountain Division attacked a company of the 808th Regiment and a mixed detachment of 7th NKVD at Sancharo Pass on 25 August, again taking the pass before being halted by Soviet reinforcements, in this case designated as the Sancharo Group of Forces. This group was ordered to recapture the pass, which took until 20 October to accomplish.

On 27 October Lt. Colonel Kantariya was replaced in command by Col. Pavel Ivanovich Belekhov. In November and December the 394th, still in 46th Army, was part of the Black Sea Group of Forces of Transcaucasus Front, defending against the last-ditch efforts of Army Group A to break through to one or more of the Black Sea ports. As of 1 January 1943 it was still under those commands, facing two battalions of the 1st Mountain Division. That month, as the German forces retreated north out of the mountains, the division was assigned to the 56th Army, still in the Black Sea Group, but in March it went into the Reserve of the Supreme High Command, where it returned to 46th Army. On 5 March, Col. Aleksandr Ivanovich Lisitsyn took over command of the division from Colonel Belekhov. In May the 394th and its Army were assigned to Southwestern Front.

== Into Ukraine ==
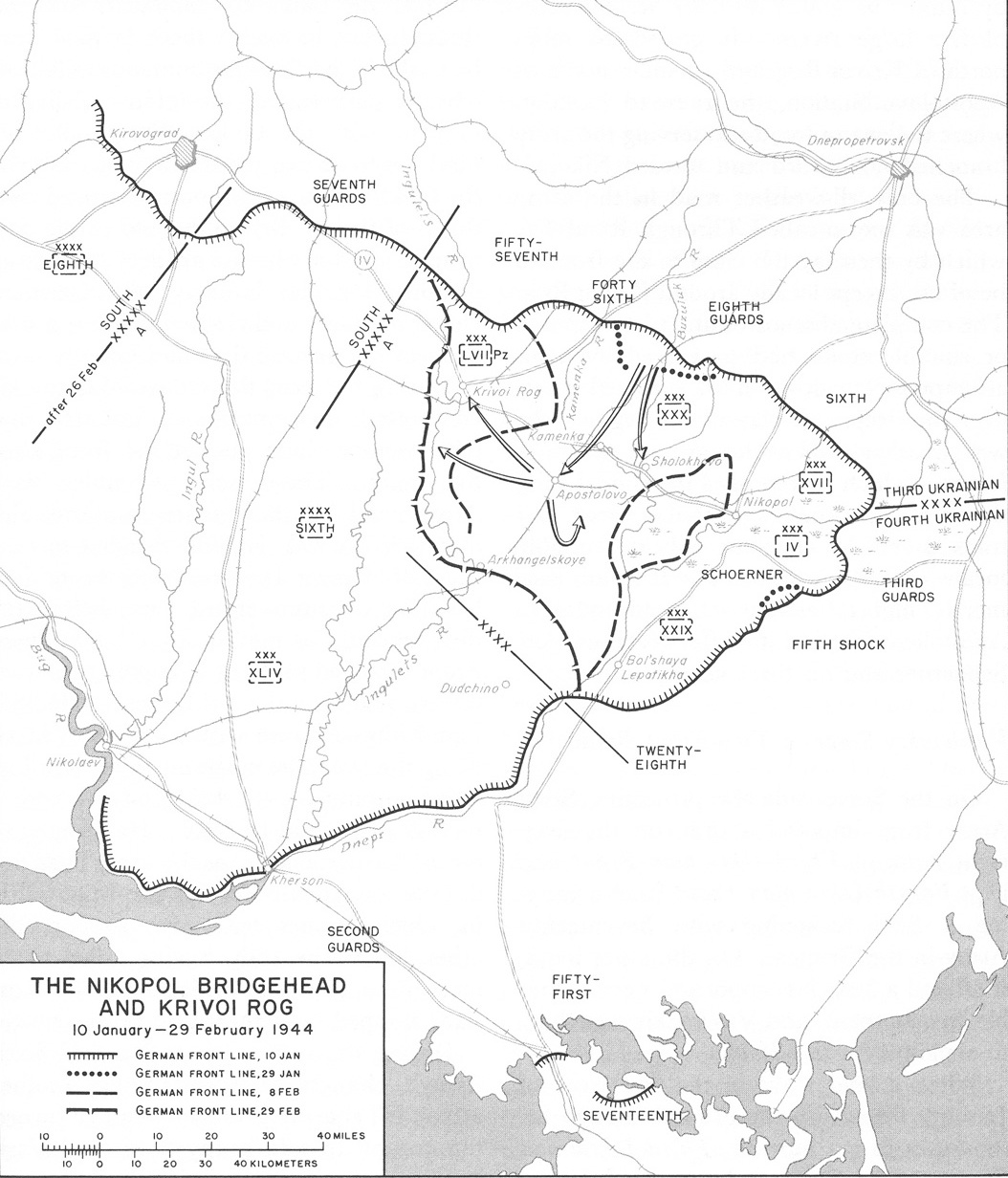
Nikopol-Krivoi Rog Offensive

In July the 394th returned to the Reserve of the Supreme High Command, but it was back in the fighting front for the Donbass Offensive in August. During September, the 46th Army was reassigned to Steppe Front during the advance to the Dniepr River, but by 1 November the division and its Army were back in the renamed 3rd Ukrainian Front, with the division now in the 26th Guards Rifle Corps, where it remained into December, when it was moved to the 34th Rifle Corps. On 10 January 1944, the Front launched an attack in part with 46th Army west of the Buzuluk River against the rebuilt German 6th Army holding out in the great bend of the Dniepr, but this miscarried when the Soviet infantry failed to keep up with the tanks. Further efforts over the next three days forced the front line back about 8 km (5.0 mi) at considerable cost. The offensive was renewed on 30 January after a powerful artillery preparation against the positions of the German XXX Army Corps on the same sector, but this was met with a counter-barrage that disrupted the attack. A new effort the next day, backed by even heavier artillery and air support, made progress but still did not penetrate the German line. On 1 February the XXX Corps line was pierced in several places and by nightfall the Soviet forces had torn a 9 km-wide (5.6 mi) gap in the line west of the Buzuluk. During the next two days 6th Army tried to avoid encirclement by slogging through the mud to the Kamenka River line, which was already compromised by the Soviet advance. Forward detachments of 8th Guards Army reached Apostolovo on the 4th and over the next few days 46th Army began to attempt a sweep westward to envelop Krivoi Rog from the south. The dispersion of the Front's forces, combined with German reserves produced by the evacuation of the Nikopol bridgehead east of the Dniepr and indecision on the part of the German high command, produced "a peculiar sort of semiparalysis" on this part of the front during the second half of the month. Finally, on 21 February elements of the 46th and 37th Armies broke into the outer defenses of Krivoi Rog. To avoid costly street fighting 6th Army was withdrawn west of the city, which was liberated the next day. The 394th was given a battle honor for its part in this action:

"KRIVOI ROG... 394th Rifle Division (Colonel Lisitsyn, Aleksandr Ivanovich)... The troops who participated in the liberation of Krivoi Rog, by the order of the Supreme High Command of 22 February 1944, and a commendation in Moscow, are given a salute of 20 artillery salvoes from 224 guns."

During the following days the 6th Army fell back to the line of the Ingulets River but the division soon helped to force a crossing there and also took part in the liberation of the town of Novogo Buga, for which on 19 March it was awarded the Order of the Red Banner. On the same day Colonel Lisitsyn was promoted to major general.

=== First Jassy-Kishinev Offensive ===
As of 1 April, the 394th was still in 34th Rifle Corps with the 236th Rifle Division. The 46th was one of three armies on the right flank 3rd Ukrainian Front that were tasked with continuing the advance towards the Dniestr River while also protecting the Front's right flank. On 8 April the Army was ordered to advance to the river as rapidly as possible. 34th Corps, on the Army's left (south) flank, was to reach the river in the sector east of Raskaetsy, 30 km (19 mi) south of Tiraspol, capture the towns of Korotnoe and Nezaertailovka near the river's east bank, force a crossing, and prepare to advance to the west. Forward detachments of the Corps reached the Dniestr late on 11 April. The two divisions managed to capture small and precarious footholds on the narrow strip of flatlands west of the river but could advance no farther. In mid-April the Army was ordered to attack the two German strongpoints of Chebruchi and Raskaetsy. The assault on the former collapsed almost immediately but the attack by 34th Corps, which was soon reinforced by the 353rd Rifle Division, in three days of heavy fighting advanced 2–5 km (1.2–3.1 mi) deep in an 8 km-wide (5.0 mi) sector south of Raskaetsy, threatening to envelop the town from the south. However, the German XXIX Army Corps reinforced the defenses at Chebruchi, allowing the 76th Infantry Division to shift most of its forces to its left wing and halt the Soviet advance. 46th Army played little subsequent role in the First Jassy-Kishinev Offensive.

== Into the Balkans ==
From May through most of August the division remained in much the same positions while the 2nd and 3rd Ukrainian Fronts prepared for a new offensive. 46th Army's front now ran from the western outskirts of Talmazy all the way to the Black Sea coast. In the last days before the assault, 34th Corps concentrated the 394th and 353rd Divisions in the bridgehead over the Dniestr at Purcari, while the 236th formed the Army's reserve. The offensive opened at dawn on 20 August, and during that day the stubborn strongpoint at Raskaetsy was finally captured. Overall, 46th Army achieved all of its first-day objectives. On the second day the 34th Corps continued its advance as the German 6th and Romanian 3rd Armies were being split apart by the Front's spearheads. By the 23rd, 46th Army was in the process of encircling the Romanian forces, and the division had advanced as far as Plakhtiivka, and the 259th Rifle Division had been subordinated to the Corps.

As the offensive continued, by the beginning of September 34th Rifle Corps was temporarily transferred to 57th Army, before coming under direct command of 3rd Ukrainian Front from September to November as the advance into Romania and Hungary went on. On 1 November the division saw its final change of command with the appointment of Col. Ilya Samsonovich Titov to replace General Lisitsyn. In the same month the Corps was reassigned to 37th Army. In December 37th Army became a separate army directly under command of Stavka, serving as a garrison for the southern Balkans for the duration of the war.

== Postwar ==
The men and women of the division ended the war with the full title 394th Rifle, Krivoi Rog, Order of the Red Banner Division. [Russian: 394-я стрелковая Криворожская Краснознамённая дивизия.] In September it was moved back to the area of Balta in Ukraine, where it was officially disbanded on 1 October.
