= Aleksandr Ivanovich Lisitsyn =

Soviet Army major general

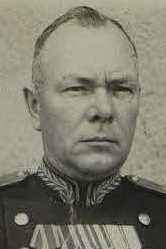
- Lisitsyn between 1945 and 1950
- Born: 25 December 1901; Aleksandrovsk-Grushevsky, Don Host Oblast, Russian Empire
- Died: 28 January 1975 (aged 73); Krasnodar, Soviet Union
- Military career
- Allegiance: Soviet Union
- Branch: Red Army (Soviet Army from 1946)
- Service years: 1920–1937; 1939–1953
- Rank: Major general
- Commands: 110th Cavalry Division; 394th Rifle Division; 21st Mechanized Division; 26th Guards Mechanized Division; 29th Mountain Rifle Corps
- Conflicts: Russian Civil War; World War II
- Awards: Order of Lenin (2)

Aleksandr Ivanovich Lisitsyn (Russian: Александр Иванович Лисицын; 25 December 1901 – 28 January 1975) was a Soviet Army major general who held divisional commands during World War II.

A veteran of the Russian Civil War, Lisitsyn rose through a series of staff and command posts in the interwar Red Army, but was dismissed from the army during the Great Purge. Restored to the army in 1939, he took command of a cavalry regiment after the German invasion of the Soviet Union. Lisitsyn commanded the 110th Cavalry Division in the Battle of the Caucasus. He led the 394th Rifle Division from spring 1943 to the end of its combat service during the war in the advance through Ukraine and into Romania. Postwar, Lisitsyn rose to corps command before the end of his career in the early 1950s.

== Early life and Russian Civil War ==
A Russian, Aleksandr Ivanovich Lisitsyn was born on 25 December 1901 in the town of Aleksandrovsk-Grushevsky, Don Host Oblast, and graduated from a vocational school in 1918. During the Russian Civil War, he joined the 35th Cavalry Regiment of the 3rd Brigade of the 6th Cavalry Division of the Red 1st Cavalry Army on 12 February 1920 at the stanitsa of Rozhdestvenskaya in the Kuban. Lisitsyn fought as a gunner of the regimental machine gun detachment against the Armed Forces of South Russia in Don Oblast. He was enrolled in the School for Red Commanders of the 1st Cavalry Army for command training on 10 April, renamed the 15th Yelisavetgrad Cavalry Courses in June. With the courses, he took part in the fighting against the Army of Wrangel in Taurida Governorate and in the elimination of Nazarov's landing in the region of Novonikolayevsk, Don Oblast before the army was shifted northwest to fight in the Polish–Soviet War. During the latter, Lisitsyn took part in battles near Korosten, Vinnitsa, and Proskurov on the Southwestern Front.

After the truce with Poland in October 1920 the courses and their parent army were sent back to the Southern Front near Melitopol to end the resistance of the Army of Wrangel. In this campaign, Lisitsyn took part in the Southern Front counteroffensive in the Northern Taurida Operation and the Perekop–Chongar Operation. After the end of fighting in Crimea Lisitsyn took part in fighting against the Makhnovites in the region of Gulyaypole and the anti-Soviet forces of Khmara in Yelizavetgrad Governorate. Lisitsyn was captured by the Makhnovites in December 1920, but escaped within an hour.

== Interwar period ==
After his graduation from the courses, Lisitsyn became a machine gunner in the Separate Cavalry Battalion of the 1st Cavalry Army Revolutionary Military Council in April 1921, then weapons instructor of the machine gun squadron of the 3rd Cavalry Regiment of the 1st Separate Cavalry Brigade. From May 1922 Lisitsyn served with the 15th Cavalry Regiment of the 1st Separate Special Cavalry Brigade as an assistant platoon commander, platoon commander, and assistant squadron commander. He became a member of the Communist Party in 1925. Lisitsyn completed the Vystrel course between March 1927 and March 1928, and after returning to the brigade was posted to the 63rd Cavalry Regiment, serving as a platoon commander in the machine gun squadron, chief of ammunition supply, and squadron commander.

Lisitsyn was transferred to serve as assistant chief of staff of the 61st Cavalry Regiment in December 1931 and then sent to the Cavalry Command Personnel Improvement Courses at Novocherkassk. After returning to the regiment in June 1932 he became its assistant chief of staff and acting chief of staff. Lisitsyn completed the Intelligence Command Personnel Improvement Courses of the 4th Directorate of the Staff of the Red Army in Moscow between October 1933 and July 1934, then was appointed assistant chief of the border intelligence post of the Ukrainian Military District Intelligence Department. He was awarded the Order of the Red Star on 23 February 1935, and in October 1936 rose to chief of the border intelligence post with the rank of captain. Lisitsyn was transferred to the reserve on 1 December 1937 during the Great Purge, suspected of political disloyalty, together with several other intelligence department commanders. He was not arrested and worked as chief of the Kalinin Oblast housing directorate.

Lisitsyn became unemployed in November 1938 and on 29 January 1939 was restored to the Red Army and appointed assistant commander for combat units of the 91st Mountain Cavalry Regiment of the Transcaucasus Military District's 17th Mountain Cavalry Division. In November 1940 he was sent back to the Cavalry Command Personnel Improvement Courses and after graduation appointed officer for special assignments of the deputy chief of the Main Directorate of Political Propaganda on 12 April 1941.

== World War II ==
After Germany invaded the Soviet Union, Lisitsyn, then a lieutenant colonel, was appointed commander of the 159th Cavalry Regiment of the 56th Cavalry Division in August 1941. The unit formed at Sevastopol and was assigned to the 10th Army on 2 October, before being withdrawn to the Southern Front reserve on 8 October. In mid-October a cavalry group was created from the division, which defended along the Krynka river as part of the 9th Army. The division began retreating towards Novoaleksandrovka, Kamyshevakha, Alekseyevka, and Olkhovka on 21 October, taking up defenses on the Mius north of Taganrog. The division was withdrawn to the front reserve on 26 October and assigned to the Separate Cavalry Corps, which on 19 November became part of the 37th Army of the Southern Front. The division took part in the Rostov Offensive Operation and between 16 and 19 December marched to the region of Petrovo-Krasnoselye, where it was assigned to the 18th Army. Assigned to the 1st Cavalry Corps of the front and the 57th Army, the division fought in the Barvenkovo–Lozovaya Offensive from 2 January 1942. During battles in the region of Barvenkovo, Lisitsyn was concussed and evacuated for treatment.

After recovering, Lisitsyn was placed at the disposal of the North Caucasus Military District Cadre Department and in April appointed commander of the 15th Reserve Cavalry Regiment, a replacement unit. He temporarily commanded the 110th Cavalry Division of the 44th Army of the Transcaucasus Front's Northern Group of Forces between 18 and 27 August, leading it in battles near Mozdok and Kizlyar. After the return of the previous division commander Lisitsyn was appointed senior assistant chief of the Operations Department of the front's Black Sea Group of Forces, and from November served as chief of staff of the partisan movement in Krasnodar Krai under the Military Council of the Black Sea Group of Forces.

Lisitsyn took command of the 394th Rifle Division of the 56th Army on 5 March 1943, leading it in the Krasnodar Offensive. The division was shifted to the 46th Army on 22 March, then withdrawn to the Reserve of the Supreme High Command for rebuilding. In August the division and its parent army were dispatched to the Southwestern Front, taking part in the Donbass Offensive. For his performance in the offensive, army commander Vasily Glagolev recommended Lisitsyn for the Order of the Red Banner, which was awarded on 16 October. The recommendation read:

Faithful to the cause of the party of Lenin and Stalin. A demanding, energetic and bold officer. Calmly and confidently directs fighting.

In battles for the village of Bolshaya Gomolsha he organized the destruction of units of the SS division of Fegelein, took the village of Bolshaya Gomolsha and forest tract south of this settlement, skillfully organized combined arms cooperation - the division inflicted a serious defeat on the enemy, securing a favorable starting position of the army for the later offensive.

He skillfully organized the pursuit of the enemy from the Merefa–Lozovaya railway line to the Dnieper, engaging the enemy, not giving him the chance to consolidate on the paths of the retreat.

The division, during the period from 25 August to 28 September 1943, fought its way over 200 kilometers.

He carries out concrete leadership of units in battle, personally present with the troops. During the battles units of the division liberated more than 90 settlements...For skillful and decisive offensive operations of the units of the division, for skillful organization of combined arms cooperation and bold actions in organizing the pursuit of the enemy, he is deserving of the award of the Order of the Red Banner.

Lisitsyn led the division in the subsequent Battle of the Dnieper and Dnepropetrovsk Offensive, during which it fought as part of the army's 26th Guards Rifle Corps. Corps commander Pavel Firsov recommended Lisitsyn for the Order of Bogdan Khmelnitsky, 2nd class, which was upgraded to the Order of Kutuzov, 2nd class, awarded on 1 November. The recommendation read:

Colonel Lisitsyn skillfully commanding subordinated units in cooperation with artillery and other branches, ensured the successful conduct of the offensive operation of the corps, assisting in the speedy liberation of the major cities of Ukraine of Dnepropetrovsk and Dneproderzhinsk. Thanks to his skillful leadership, units of the division managed to fight their way up to 70 kilometers between 22 and 31 October 1943, liberating in this dozens of settlements, including the major settlements of Mironovka, Semenyovka, Chervonaya Ivanovka, Adamovka...For skillful leadership of subordinate units in battle, and firm implementation of the decisions of the corps commander, ensuring the successful destruction of the enemy and his equipment, and liberation of significant territory of Ukraine, Colonel Lisitsyn is deserving of the award of the Order of Bogdan Khmelnitsky, 2nd class.

The division shifted to the defensive when it reached the region of Marye-Dmitryevka and Dolgoye. Lisitsyn led the 394th in the Nikopol–Krivoi Rog Offensive from 29 January and the subsequent Bereznegovatoye–Snigirevka offensive, during which the division fought as part of the army's 34th Rifle Corps. Elements of the division were among the first to enter the southern outskirts of Krivoi Rog and on 22 February captured the city center, then the mining district on the southwestern outskirts. For his performance in the Nikopol–Krivoi Rog Offensive, corps commander Ivan Kosobutsky recommended Lisitsyn for the Order of Lenin, which was awarded on 19 March. The recommendation read:

Comrade Lisitsyn, during the active offensive operations, showed himself to be a strong-willed, energetic commander, having great tactical and operational experience and the necessary vision for division command.

He quickly and correctly accomplishes the objectives set before the division, decisively and persistently implements his decisions, and displays reasonable initiative in all aspects of his duties. He precisely and uninterruptedly directs troops in battle. The division under the command of Comrade Lisitsyn, from 17 to 22 February 1944, took the following settlements: Marienfeld, Ivanovka, Novyi Krivoi Rog, Antonovka and the major rail junction of Krivoi Rog. During this period it wiped out 2,152 enemy soldiers and officers...

During the combat operations, in the most critical moments, he was directly with the combat formations, as an experienced organizer of battle excellently and correctly directed the battle, and also with his personal example of courage and valor, and boundless love for the Homeland, roused privates and sergeants to new combat feats to take the city and rail junction of Krivoi Rog.

Loyal to the party of Lenin and Stalin and the socialist homeland. He is deserving of the Order of Lenin.

Continuing the offensive, the 394th forced a crossing of the Ingulets, taking Novaya Odessa and Troitskaya by 18 March and reaching the left bank of the Southern Bug. On the next day, 19 March, forcing a crossing of the river, the 394th took Andreyevka-Erdelevaya and a seized a bridgehead on the opposite bank. The same day, Lisitsyn was promoted to major general. During the subsequent Odessa Offensive the 394th broke through the German defenses in the region of Novo-Andreyevka and Yasnaya Polyana in late March. It forced a crossing of the Dniester by 11 April, seizing a bridgehead in the region of Raskantsy and Tsurkary and until 18 July fought to hold it. During the Second Jassy–Kishinev offensive, the 394th, together with the 46th Army, destroyed the units of the Romanian Third Army, and by the end of 21 August forced a crossing of the Danube. For his performance in the Jassy–Kishinev offensive, Kosobutsky recommended Lisitsyn for the Order of Suvorov, 2nd class, but this was downgraded to the Order of Bogdan Khmelnitsky, 2nd class, awarded on 13 September. The recommendation read:

Major General Lisitsyn, in the battles on the Lower Dniester bridgehead, showed himself to be a steadfast and decisive commander, able to accomplish combat orders.

Receiving a combat order about the offensive on 20 August 1944 he correctly organized combined arms cooperation and rapid movement forward, dislodging the enemy in front of him and by 25 August took the settlements of Purkar, Olanesht, Antonesht, Karagasan, Kaplan, Moldovanka, Tsarichanka Veke, and Tsarichanka Nou and in cooperation with the 353rd Rifle Division, units of the 394th Rifle Division surrounded uncoordinated groups of German and Romanian soldiers, the broken 10th, 2nd, 15th, 9th and part of the 21st Infantry Divisions of the German and Romanian invaders, in the region of the major settlement of Plakhteyevka.

In these battles the division took about 1,900 soldiers and officers prisoner...wiped out 1,600 soldiers and officers...The tasks for the offensive were fulfilled fully and in a timely manner by the 394th Rifle Division.

For conspicuous successes in the work of directing troops, excellent organization of combat operations and displaying in this decisiveness and persistence in their conduct, as a result of which a victory in the battles for the Homeland was achieved, Major General Lisitsyn is deserving of the award of the Order of Suvorov, 2nd class.

Continuing the advance, the division, assigned to the 57th Army of the 3rd Ukrainian Front, reached the Romanian–Bulgarian border by 1 September. The division took part in the occupation of Bulgaria and remained garrisoned there. Lisitsyn was sent to the Voroshilov Higher Military Academy for advanced training in December.

== Postwar ==
Postwar, Lisitsyn graduated from an accelerated course at the academy in January 1946 and was sent to the Northern Group of Forces in February to command the 21st Mechanized Division. He transferred to command the 26th Guards Mechanized Division in December. He was promoted to command the 29th Mountain Rifle Corps of the North Caucasus Military District in May 1951. Lisitsyn was transferred to the reserve on 6 November 1953 due to illness and died in Krasnodar on 28 January 1975. He was buried at the Slavyansky cemetery.

== Awards ==
Lisitsyn was a recipient of the following awards:

- Order of Lenin (2)
- Order of the Red Banner (3)
- Order of Kutuzov, 2nd class
- Order of Bogdan Khmelnitsky, 2nd class
- Order of the Red Star
