= 338th Rifle Division =

- Active: 1941–1946
- Country: Soviet Union
- Branch: Red Army
- Type: Infantry
- Size: Division
- Engagements: Battle of Moscow; Battles of Rzhev; Battle of Smolensk (1943); Operation Bagration; Baltic Offensive; Riga Offensive (1944); Vistula-Oder Offensive; Battle of Königsberg; Samland Offensive; Soviet invasion of Manchuria
- Decorations: Order of the Red Banner 2nd Formation
- Battle honours: Neman

Commanders
- Notable commanders: Col. Vladimir Georgievich Kuchinev; Col. Nikolai Olimpievich Guz; Maj. Gen. Hmayak Babayan; Col. Fyodor Kharitonovich Polevoii; Col. Yakov Filippovich Potekhin; Maj. Gen. Leonid Nikolaievich Lozanovich

The 338th Rifle Division was first formed in September 1941, as a standard Red Army rifle division, at Penza. This formation took part in the early stages of the winter counteroffensive and made gains in the direction of Vyazma before being cut off behind German lines in February and largely destroyed by May. The division was formed again in June, once again in the Western Front, and proved itself a stolid and reliable unit in the often frustrating battles east and west of Smolensk and into the Baltic states over the next two and a half years. After taking part in the conquest of East Prussia in 1945, the 338th, along with the rest of its 39th Army, was railed all the way to the far east to join in the Soviet invasion of Manchuria in August.

== 1st Formation ==
The division started forming on September 9, 1941, at Penza in the Volga Military District. Col. Vladimir Georgievich Kuchinev was appointed to command on the same day and he would hold that command through the entire 1st Formation and well into the 2nd. Its basic order of battle was as follows:

- 1134th Rifle Regiment
- 1136th Rifle Regiment
- 1138th Rifle Regiment
- 910th Artillery Regiment

After about a month, the division was assigned to 26th Army in the Reserve of the Supreme High Command. When this Army was moved north in November the 338th remained behind as a separate division in the Reserve. In mid-December the division was assessed as combat-ready and was assigned to 33rd Army in the central sector of Western Front.

=== Battle of Moscow ===
In its first operation the division was assigned to the Army's shock group for an attack on the Naro-Fominsk - Kamenskoe sector at dawn on December 18. Each division of the shock group had 10 tanks in support. The German front along this sector had been in their hands for two months and was extensively fortified. After an hour-long artillery preparation the 338th's assault managed to liberate the village of Sliznevo on the east bank of the Nara River but got no farther that day or the following due to stubborn enemy resistance. No other units made appreciable gains, and 33rd Army's offensive was shut down on December 20.

After regrouping, the 338th joined in an attack in January, 1942, straight west through the overstretched and depleted German 4th Army through Mozhaisk towards Vyasma. In February this penetration became a trap when a German counter-thrust cut off 33rd Army behind German lines. By April the Army was being slowly ground down in its positions in the woods east of Vyasma, dependent on small-scale air supply; the Army commander, Lt. Gen. Mikhail Grigoryevich Yefremov, took his own life to avoid capture when a breakout attempt failed. Over the following months small groups and individuals of the 338th filtered through the German lines to rejoin the Soviet front. On May 24 the division was officially disbanded, and its survivors were incorporated into the 113th Rifle Division of the rebuilding 33rd Army. Colonel Kuchinev was able to escape, with a small command cadre, and soon took command of the division's 2nd formation.

== 2nd Formation ==
A new 338th Rifle Division began forming on June 4, 1942, in 43rd Army of Western Front, based on the 18th Rifle Brigade. The order of battle remained the same as that of the first formation.

=== 18th Rifle Brigade ===
This brigade began forming in September, 1941, in the Oryol Military District, but like its "sister" 17th Brigade had to be evacuated eastwards in October as the German forces approached. In late November it entered the reserves of Western Front, and arrived at the front in late December, joining the advancing 16th Army west of Moscow. In January, 1942 it was reassigned southwards to 43rd Army, still in Western Front, facing the enemy south of the Moscow - Minsk highway and west of Maloyaroslavets. The brigade remained in this Army until it was disbanded.

=== Battles for Smolensk ===
Two months later the 338th was reassigned to 49th Army, still in Western Front. During the German Operation Büffel and the Soviet follow-up in the Third Rzhev–Sychevka Offensive Operation, the division was part of an attacking force of about eight rifle divisions and seven tank brigades from 33rd, 49th and 50th Armies, plus two tank corps, that attempted to break through the new German lines at the base of the former Rzhev salient in the direction of Spas-Demensk. In the course of this attack the 338th returned to 33rd Army for a few weeks; after this attempt failed due to appalling terrain conditions and strong German defenses it was moved back to the 49th. It remained there until September, taking part in the offensive that liberated both Spas-Demensk and, eventually, Smolensk.

In September the division was moved back to 33rd Army and assigned to 70th Rifle Corps. On September 9, after exactly two years in command, Colonel Kuchinev finally passed the reins to Col. Nikolai Olimpievich Guz, who would hold them until mid-March, 1944. On October 3, Western Front began the first of a series of ill-fated offensives in the direction of Orsha. The 338th and its corps-mate, 371st Rifle Division, were deployed on the army's right wing between Lenino and Mikulino facing the German 95th Infantry Division. 33rd Army's attack faced stronger German defenses than its neighboring armies to the north, and by October 9 its assaults expired without any success. Over the following days 33rd and 49th Armies regrouped for a new offensive; the 338th remained in place for several days to conceal and protect the movements behind its lines. The new assault, which included the action known as the Battle of Lenino, began on October 12 but was once again stymied with limited gains and significant casualties, especially among the ranks of the Polish 1st Infantry Division.

By November 14 the division, along with its Corps, had been redeployed to 31st Army, north of the Dniepr River, still on the Orsha axis. After a lengthy artillery preparation on this date, four armies of Western Front made yet another attack to the west. Assault and penal battalions of 10th Guards Army to its north advanced up to 2.5 km despite heavy fog that shrouded the battlefield; the 338th kept pace with an advance of up to 1.5 km, but the remaining divisions of its Army bogged down in the German forward security belt due to heavy machine gun fire. On November 17, 70th Corps, along with 15th Guards Rifle Corps spearheaded by units of 2nd Guards Tank Corps, wedged into the boundary between 78th Assault and 25th Panzer Grenadier Divisions north of the Orsha highway, but this attack also faltered. In five days of intense fighting the two Soviet armies managed to advance a mere 4 – 5 km, while the remainder of the Front's forces gained even less.

In the following months the advance towards Orsha by Western Front was suspended in favor of the encirclement and reduction of Vitebsk. In mid-February, 1944, the Front commander, Army Gen. V.D. Sokolovsky, proposed a preliminary attack by elements of 5th and 31st Armies in the direction of Babinavichy, to draw German forces southwards from Vitebsk. By this time the 338th was in the 45th Rifle Corps of 5th Army. Under this plan the division would be part of a shock group attacking westward south of the Sukhodrovka River to outflank the German strongpoint at Vysochany. The attack, beginning on February 22, once again made very limited gains, in part because 3rd Panzer Army had shortened its lines around Vitebsk to free up reserves. By the end of this offensive, the division was down to a strength of just 3,605 men. In the following months Sokolovsky lost his job, and further attacks were suspended to prepare for a summer offensive.

== Advance ==
On March 31, the divisional command was taken by Col. Hmayak Grigorevich Babayan. He would be promoted to the rank of Major General on July 15, and would remain in command until October 25. In April, Western Front was split, and the 338th became part of 3rd Belorussian Front. In the opening stages of Operation Bagration the division was in a secondary role; it was in the second echelon of 45th Corps, which was itself in second echelon of 5th Army. After a 2-hour and 20 minute artillery preparation and attacks from the air, 5th Army, deployed on a 30 km front, kicked off its assault on the afternoon of June 22. Its immediate objective was to penetrate the German lines and liberate the town of Bogushevsk. The 159th Rifle Division led 45th Corps, with the 184th and 338th following. The German 256th Infantry Division was defending, with elements of the 95th Infantry Division in reserve. On the first day the attackers broke through the immediate German defenses and began charging westward. By noon on the 23rd 5th Army had turned southwards and began crossing the Luchesa River; by midnight it was only 13 km from Bogushevsk. On the morning of June 24 the German VI Army Corps was still holding a line about 10 km east of Bogushevsk, but this was soon broken, with Soviet tanks entering the town at noon with infantry following. 45th Corps reached there early on June 26, continuing to advance towards Senno. By the end of June 27 the 338th was well past there and had reached Cherekhya, not far from Lake Lukomlskoye.

In August the division was shifted to the reserves of 3rd Belorussian Front and joined the 113th Rifle Corps. By the middle of the month it had advanced nearly to the city of Jonava in Lithuania. In September 113th Corps was assigned to 39th Army; the 338th would remain under those commands for the duration of the war. Progress slowed over the following month as the German front was rebuilt, and when the Riga Offensive began in mid-September the division was just west of Kėdainiai. In the next two weeks it made little further progress, but began a more successful advance towards Raseiniai in early October.

In the operational plan for the Vistula-Oder Offensive, the main shock group of 39th Army, gathered on its left flank, was to launch a vigorous attack in the direction of Pilkallen and Tilsit to surround and destroy the German grouping in this area in conjunction with 5th Army. Meanwhile, 113th Corps, including the 338th, was to attack from behind the right flank of the Army's shock group in the direction of Lazdenen, with the objective of rolling up the German positions to the north. By January 17 the offensive was developing well, and three German infantry divisions were trying to escape a developing pocket in the Lazdenen area; 113th Corps was ordered to speed up its attack by conducting night operations in the direction of Gross Skeisgirren. By this time it was clear that 39th Army had made the decisive advance into East Prussia and the front commander, Gen. Ivan Chernyakhovsky, ordered his armor reserves and 11th Guards Army to exploit the breach. By January 22 the advance had become a pursuit; 113th Corps was advancing behind 94th Rifle Corps and had reached Popelken. On the 27th the 39th Army was straining to surround Königsberg from the north as quickly as possible, and the division was part of a force ordered to reach the shore of the Frisches Haff.

From February until April the division was part of the Soviet force occupying positions on the Sambia Peninsula. When the final assault on Königsberg began on April 6 the 338th, along with its Corps, was deployed in two echelons immediately northwest of the city. Its attacks over the next three days were hindered by counterattacks by the German Samland Group attempting to maintain contact with the city. After the fall of Königsberg on the 9th, 3rd Belorussian Front was tasked with the destruction of the Samland Group, which began on April 13 and was completed on the 25th. In late April the entire 39th Army went into the Reserve of the Supreme High Command, and was moved by rail to the far east. By July the division was part of the Transbaikal Front.

== Postwar ==
On July 4, the division came under the command of Maj. Gen. Leonid Nikolaevich Lozanovich, and he would remain in command until after the end of the Manchurian campaign. At the time of the Japanese surrender, the soldiers of the division carried the full title of 338th Rifle, Neman, Division (Russian: 338-я стрелковая Неманская дивизия), but on September 20 they were awarded the Order of the Red Banner for their achievements in this campaign. The division was disbanded in the summer of 1946 along with the 113th Rifle Corps in Port Arthur.
