= 271st Rifle Division =

- Active: July 1941 – summer 1945
- Country: Soviet Union
- Branch: Red Army
- Type: Rifle division
- Engagements: World War II
- Decorations: Order of the Red Banner; Order of Bogdan Khmelnitsky 2nd class
- Battle honours: Gorlovka

The 271st Rifle Division (Russian: 271-я стрелковая дивизия) was an infantry division of the Soviet Union's Red Army during World War II.

Formed in the summer of 1941, the division fought in the Crimean Campaign, during which it was destroyed and rebuilt twice. Designated an Azerbaijani national division in the summer of 1942, the 271st went on to fight in the Donbas strategic offensive, the Carpathians, and in Czechoslovakia before being disbanded postwar in the summer of 1945.

== History ==
The 271st began forming on 10 July 1941 from reservists at Orel, part of the Orel Military District. Its basic order of battle included the 865th, 867th and the 869th Rifle Regiments, as well as the 850th Artillery Regiment. In early August it was relocated south and assigned to the 51st Army in Crimea. The division fought in the defense of Crimea between September and November, and was evacuated to the North Caucasus in November. In the North Caucasus the division was transferred to the 47th Army, and returned to the Crimea in March 1942, fighting in the Battle of the Kerch Peninsula. It was soon transferred back to the 51st Army, and was destroyed on 8 May when the final German offensive, Operation Bustard Hunt, began. The remnants of the division were evacuated to the North Caucasus, where they were completely rebuilt. In August the division was designated an Azerbaijani national division.

During the last months of 1942, the 271st fought as part of the Transcaucasian Front's Northern Group, later with the 58th Army and the 44th Army. In February 1943, along with the rest of the 44th Army, the division was transferred to the Southern Front. When the Donbas strategic offensive began in July, the division was part of the 28th Army. In September it was transferred to the 58th Army, now in the Reserve of the Supreme High Command. The division returned to the front in December with the 1st Guards Army. For most of 1944, the division was part of the 18th Army, fighting in the Carpathian mountains. In October, the division transferred to the 1st Guards Army, and from February served with the 38th Army's 95th Rifle Corps, fighting in Czechoslovakia. The 271st was disbanded in the summer of 1945 with the Northern Group of Forces.
