= Feodosia Gulf =

Coordinates: 45°00′00″N 35°36′00″E

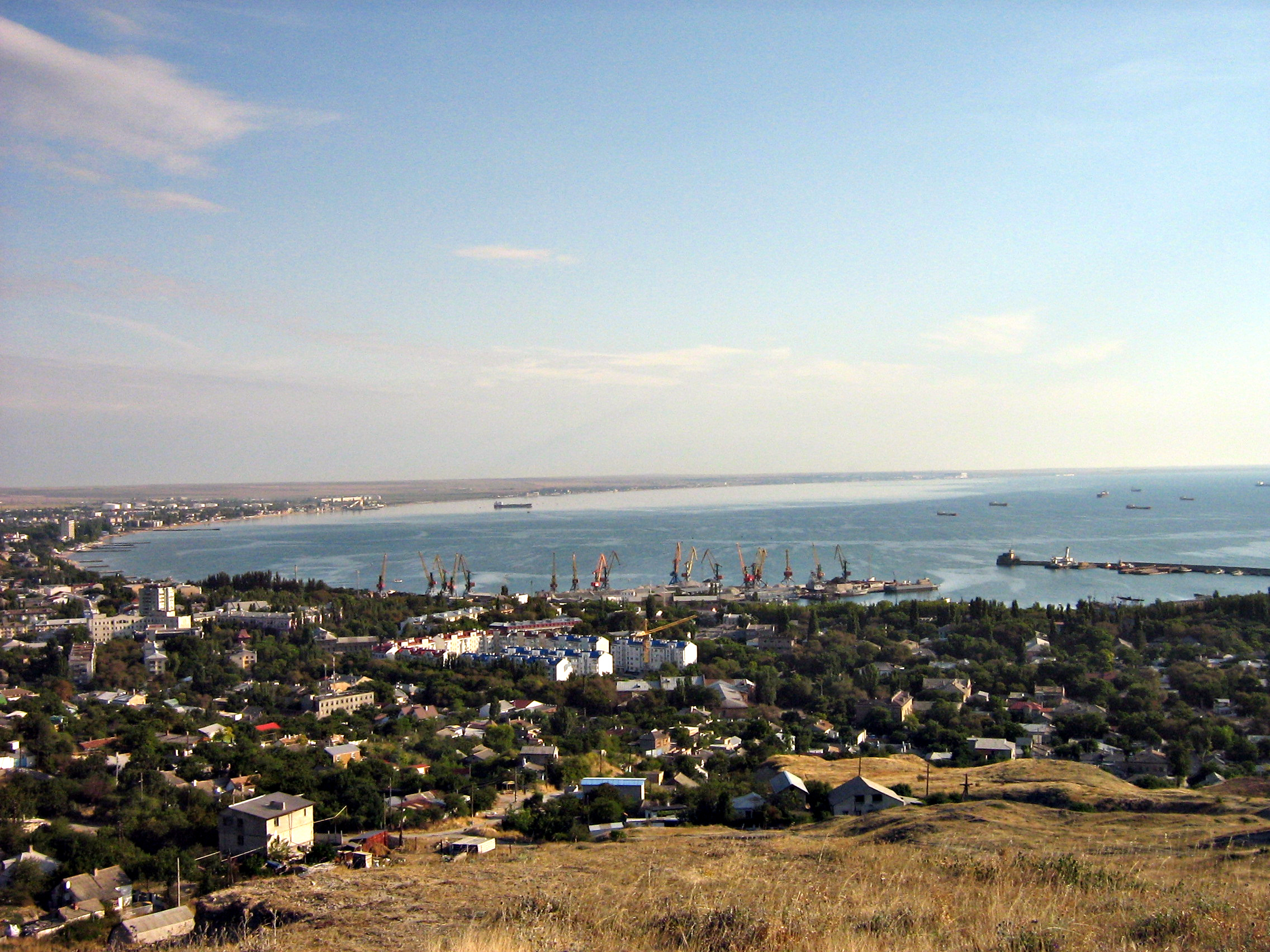

- Location within Crimea
- Location: Black Sea
- Ocean/sea sources: Atlantic Ocean
- Basin countries: Russia/Ukraine
- Max. length: 13 km (8.1 mi)
- Max. width: 31 km (19 mi)
- Average depth: 28 m (92 ft)

Feodosia Gulf (Russian: Феодосийский залив; Ukrainian: Феодосійська затока; Crimean Tatar: Kefe körfezi, Кефе корьфези) is a gulf in the Black Sea near Feodosia, Crimea.
