= Isthmus of Ak-Monay =

Istmus in Crimea, Ukraine

Coordinates: 45°12′36″N 35°31′34″E

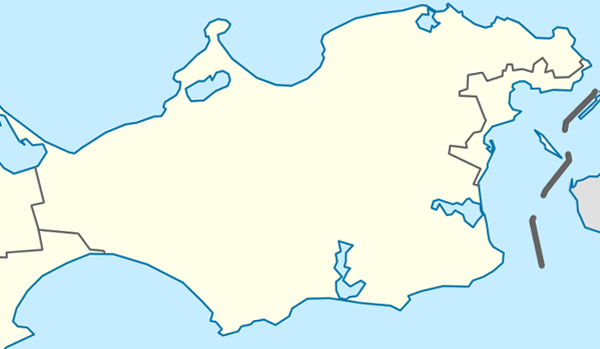
Map of Kerch Peninsula with the isthmus at left

The Isthmus of Ak-Monay (Russian: Ак-Монайский перешеек; Ukrainian: Ак-Монайський перешийок; Crimean Tatar: Aq Manay boynu, Акъ Манай бойну) or Isthmus of Parpach (Russian: Парпачский перешеек) is a narrowing of the Crimea Peninsula to a 17-km width between the Gulf of Feodosia (Black Sea) to the south and Sivash and the Bay of Arabat (Sea of Azov) to the north. The isthmus connects Kerch Peninsula to the rest of Crimea.

The names was given by the former names of the villages Kamenskoe (Ak-Monay) and Yachmennoe (Parpach).

== Sources ==
- Гриневецкий С. Р., Зонн И. С., Жильцов С. С. Ак-Монайский перешеек // Черноморская энциклопедия. М.: Международные отношения, 2006. — ISBN 5-7133-1273-9
