= Cavalry corps (Soviet Union) =

Red Army military formation

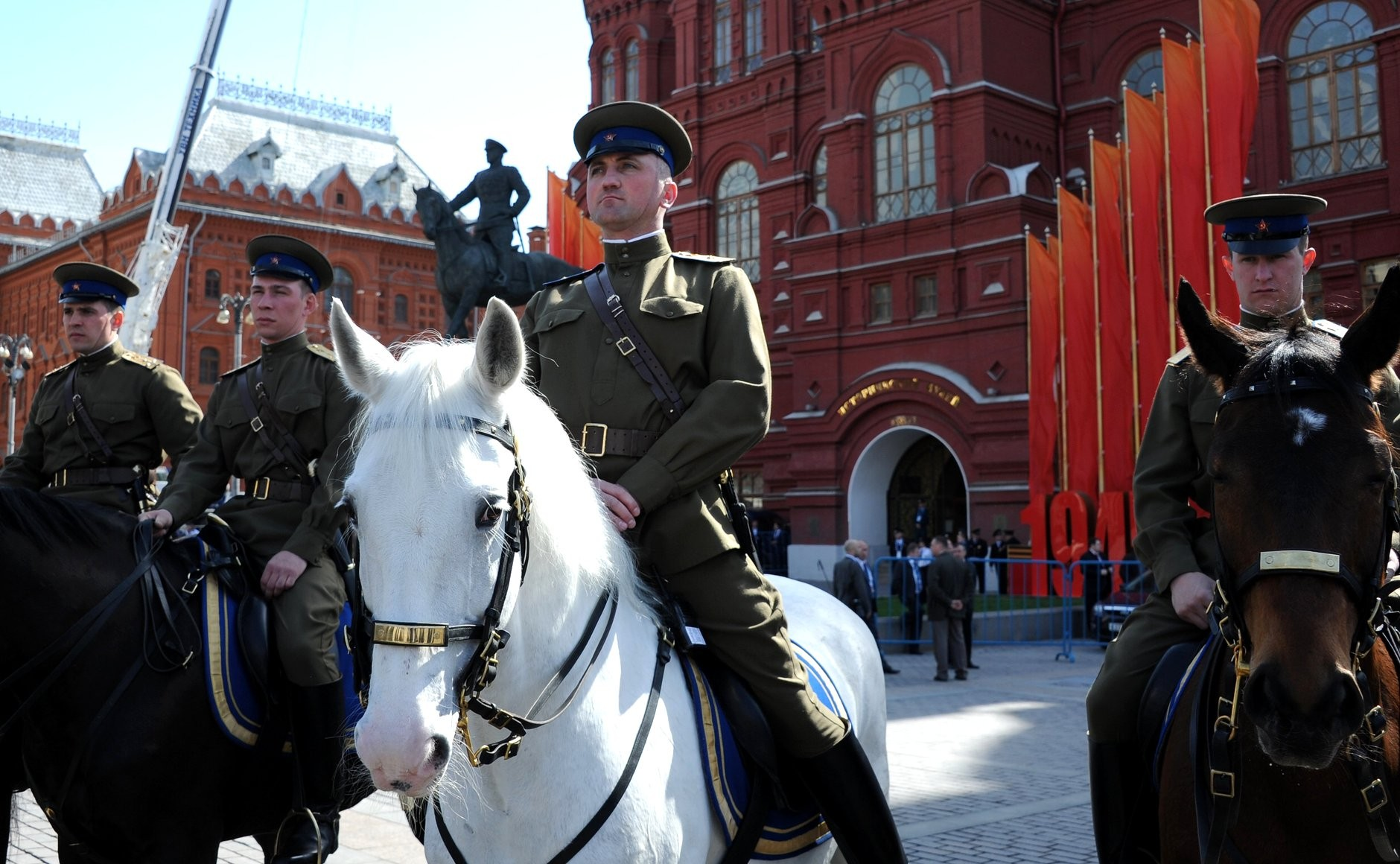
Members of the Kremlin Regiment on horseback dressed in the uniforms of the cavalry corps.

The cavalry corps (Russian: кавалерийский корпус) of the Workers and Peasant Red Army was a type of military formation that existed from the early days of the Russian Civil War until 1947 when the Red Army was renamed as the Soviet Army and all cavalry corps were disbanded.

== Structure of the Corps ==
The cavalry corps represented the foundation of large mobile formations in the Red Army, and most were converted to mechanized and motorized corps during the 1930s. However, due to severe losses in vehicles by the Red Army following the German invasion of USSR many more cavalry corps were raised. The Soviet Cavalry Corps was the largest of the cavalry units and was equal to an army on the battlefield, however during major operations cavalry groups such as Dovator and Belov were established. During the Second World War the cavalry corps were used primarily as components of the Cavalry Mechanized Groups that were inserted into the breakthrough sector of the Front following an offensive, paired with either a tank corps or a mechanized corps, providing additional mobile infantry component that could escort tanks and support them against enemy anti-tank defenses. Sometimes dismounted cavalrymen were used as tank desant to ensure closer cooperation between tanks and cavalry.

These corps initially included two cavalry divisions, two self-propelled artillery regiments, and a signals battalion and a tank battalion of 31 tanks. These light cavalry divisions were 3,447 men, 3,890 horses, eight 76.2mm guns, twelve 72.6mm howitzers, eight 45mm anti-tank guns, eight 120mm mortars, forty-eight 50mm mortars, nine 12.7mm anti-aircraft machine guns, forty-eight heavy machine guns, 113 light machineguns. Medium tanks were often replaced with light tanks, tankettes, or armoured cars. This new smaller division considerably accelerated mobilization and proved easier to command for the great mass of inexperienced officers.

In June 1941, each Soviet Cavalry Corps consisted of 18,000 men, 15,552 horses, 124 tanks, 44 armored cars, 64 artillery 32 antitank guns, and 40 anti-aircraft guns. Each Cavalry Division was made of 3,000 men. Additionally having 128 tanks 36 armored cars, 64 artillery guns and AA guns over 76mm, 32 anti-aircraft, 120 mortars, and 430 light medium or heavy MGs. Each Cavalry Regiment had 32 heavy machine guns, 8 anti-tank guns, and 8 artillery pieces.

Between July and December 1941, the cavalry arm expanded from thirteen to eighty-two divisions. On paper they were authorized 128 sub machine-guns; however, like Pavel Belov 1st Guards Cavalry Corps, most of the cavalry was primarily armed with rifles prior to the Moscow counteroffensive in December 1941. In 1943 the cavalry was expanded into cavalry-mechanized groups with additional cavalry division being added, thus bringing the regular division to 6000. Additionally, all divisions received a tank regiment with its own air force unit.

Red Army cavalry organization differs considerably from the organization of US cavalry units. Numerically, Red Army units are the smaller. A Soviet cavalry corps is roughly equal numerically to a reinforced US horse cavalry division. Within the Red Army cavalry corps, also, are from two to four tank regiments as organic elements of the corps. The U.S.S.R. cavalry regiment is so designed as to provide a small and mobile striking force, heavily reinforced by supporting weapons. Numerically equal to less than half a Red Army infantry regiment, the U.S.S.R. cavalry regiment has almost as much firepower in supporting weapons.

== Operational history ==
While the Soviet cavalry was often thought to be the most combat-ready arm of the Soviet ground forces, its tanks and trucks were in a deplorable state of operational readiness. Early in the war, tank and paratrooper units were put under the cavalry command during the difficult situations. This demonstrates the role of the cavalry on the Frontline as it was the most mobile force available during 1941–43. The cavalry usually fought under-strength of 3000 men at full strength for a division, while often being in the most damaging parts of the battle. A full-strength cavalry Corps of 18,000 men had to do the same output as an army of 60,000-100,000 men on the given task. Some legendary cavalry units often surpassed those expectations given to them by STAVKA two commanded by Pavel Belov and Lev Dovator. Later these units led by Issa Pliyev and Viktor Kirillovich Baranov would perform with high proficiency even in the worst situations they found the way to keep fighting, never being captured or destroyed throughout the war.

The cavalry operated successfully during the whole war, particularly during the difficult early stages of the war. The speed of the German advance often spread out the units thinly, allowing Soviet cavalry formations to launch raids into its enemy's rear. At dawn on August 28, 1941, Col. Lev Dovator led a cavalry group of three thousand sabers (accompanied by medium and light machine guns but no artillery or armor) in a mounted attack which, broke through the 450th German Infantry Regiment. Over the next two days, Dovator's command inflicted some twenty-five hundred casualties on the Germans; they overran two regimental headquarters and the topographical department of the Sixth Army; they destroyed two hundred motor vehicles, two tanks, four armored cars, four artillery pieces, and six mortars; and they captured fifteen hundred rifles and automatic weapons, which were used to arm a partisan detachment left behind the German lines.

Despite the name, for the most part, the troops of the cavalry corps operated primarily as dismounted infantry. Soviet cavalry doctrine emphasized that cavalry should dismount to fight unless specific circumstances existed to attack mounted. Mounted attacks were called for when the enemy was weak and his defense unorganized. The enemy must be unaware of the cavalry's presence and the terrain must favor its approach. After the enemies retreated they were able to pursue the enemy on horses along with tanks resulting in great enemy losses.

Their horses were the only units able to negotiate terrain that would prove difficult to motor vehicles, while at the same time being able to conduct rapid raids into the rear of the enemy positions. Often fighting along with other penetrating or later shock units, this was often done in the most crucial parts of the battlefield. During Battle of Moscow, in the central part, both generals Lev Dovator whose cavalrymen and Ivan Panfilov and his men were KIA during the dire days of the battle, their sacrifice bought crucial time for the Soviets to shift forces into the region and stabilize the front at the gates of Moscow. In the south Pavel Belov and his cavalrymen played a pivotal role in helping to lead and destroy Guderian army group that was enveloping Moscow from the south thus helping the nearly encircled 50th Army in Tula. Later during the crucial encirclement of the Battle of Stalingrad, the cavalry units Issa Pliev with their mobility were the first to close the circle entrapping the German 6th Army. These heroic actions were done often throughout the war resulting in another stunning achievement for the cavalry as they were the first to fully encircle Berlin and bring another great achievement with them. Its key contributions through the war were one of the key reasons that Stalin chose the Cavalry to meet with the Allies on the Elbe.

During the Battle for Moscow, elements of Generaloberst Heinz Guderian's 2nd Panzer Group tried to seize Kashira, a town that was vital to the Soviet defenses on the Western Front on 18 November 1941. Kashira was 80 kilometres north-west of Tula and 120 kilometers south-south-west of Moscow. In a desperate attempt to defend the town, STAVKA hurled Major General Pavel Belov's 2nd Cavalry Corps, later renamed 1st Guards Cavalry Corps on 26 November, 112th "Revolutionary Mongolia" Tank Brigade, a battalion of BM-13 Katyusha rocket launchers and air support at the Germans. The defense and counter-attack were utterly successful, and the fascist troops were driven back by 40 kilometres. Total cavalry numbered roughly 50,000 in the battle of which some consisted of Cossacks. These elite troops achieved great success from their advantage in cavalry, superior physicality, bravery, and mental strength made up for their small numbers. Cavalry was constantly on the move to disrupt lines with little sleep, as they fought by day and moved and raided at night. As was demonstrated during the 1941-42 Moscow counter-offensive, rifle units penetrated enemy lines, which were then successfully exploited by cavalry, supported by tanks. These mobile formations effectively disrupted the German rear, allowing Soviet riflemen to push back German lines. This cavalry tank tactic created a higher operational tempo, making it difficult for the Germans to re-establish a defensive line. These tactics were most famously applied by Lev Dovator who fell during the counteroffensive in the Battle of Moscow. Additionally Pavel Belov demonstrated this art of war successfully against Guderian's 2nd Panzer Group in the south part of the city, which later resulted in his famous 5-month raid behind the German 9th Army. Belov attacked the headquarters on a few occasions, while slipping away every time. This got the attention of Franz Halder who later had 7 German divisions on the pursue, this was over 100,000 men resulting in one of the greatest chases in world history earning him the nickname the Fox.

More significantly, the raid so unnerved the German high command that it slowed its advance in that sector, withdrawing units from the frontline. Aircraft, armor, and motorized infantry all failed to intercept Dovator as he weaved across the country and passed safely back through the lines. By late summer, a number of new cavalry formations had been established, and the Soviet army would eventually field eight full cavalry corps. The contributions of Belov and Dovator in slowing down the Nazi advance were recognized, and they were given command, respectively, of the 1st and 2nd Guards Cavalry Corps.

In the Battle for Stalingrad, three cavalry corps, the 8th (including the 21st, 55th, and 112th cavalry divisions), the 3rd Guards (including the 5th and 6th Guards and 32nd cavalry divisions) and the 4th Cavalry Corps (61st and 81st cavalry divisions) participated in the counter-offensive. These varied in strength between 22,500 and 10,200 personnel and had from 18,000 to 9,000 horses.

Between April 1942 and July 1942, the Red Army, suffering a shortage of horses, disbanded 41 cavalry divisions. The lack of horses was the deciding factor in the reduction in the cavalry units. Soviet cavalry was incorporated into a Cavalry Mechanized Group, which was very well equipped to perform shock attacks able to penetrate and pursue the enemy. It remained an important factor in later stages of the war. For instance, Operation Bagration might have not been as successful if it wasn't for mechanized cavalry units using deep battle penetration to keep up with the tanks upon breakthrough. Until the end of the war, the Soviet cavalry remained to be respected and feared by its enemies. In the final months, it demonstrated once more how effective cavalry could be in a modern age when applied properly, as they successfully encircled Berlin and later were instrumental in the Japanese in 1945 during the Battle of Manchuria, cementing their legacy as one of the finest units of the war.

== Corps and time of formation ==
Disbandment dates are from Bonn, Slaughterhouse.

- 1st Cavalry Corps (Soviet Union) - 16 December 1941, disbanded c. March 1942.
- 2nd Cavalry Corps (Soviet Union) - March–November 1941, then converted to 1st Guards Cavalry Corps, second formation 23 December 1941, disbanded June 1942.
- 3rd Cavalry Corps (Soviet Union) - 20 November 1941, converted to 2nd Guards Cavalry Corps.
- 4th Cavalry Corps (Soviet Union) - 18 March 1941, disbanded May 1943.
- 5th Cavalry Corps (Soviet Union) - March 1941-December 1941, then converted to 3rd Guards Cavalry Corps, second formation 1 January 1942, disbanded July 1943.
- 6th Cavalry Corps (Soviet Union) - March 1940-July 1941, second formation 30 November 1941, disbanded May 1942.
- 7th Cavalry Corps (Soviet Union) - 26 December 1941, converted to 6th Guards Cavalry Corps, January 1943
- 8th Cavalry Corps (Soviet Union) - January 1942, converted to 7th Guards Cavalry Corps, 14 February 1943.
- 9th Cavalry Corps (Soviet Union) - 1 January 1942, disbanded 11 April 1942.
- 10th Cavalry Corps (Soviet Union) - 12 January 1942, disbanded 3 February 1942.
- 11th Cavalry Corps (Soviet Union) - 12 January 1942, disbanded 8 August 1942.
- 12th Cavalry Corps (Soviet Union) - 12 January 1942, disbanded 3 February 1942.
- 13th Cavalry Corps (Soviet Union) - 20 January 1942, disbanded July 1942.
- 14th Cavalry Corps (Soviet Union) - 23 January 1942, disbanded April 1942.
- 15th Cavalry Corps (Soviet Union) - 1 January 1942. In May 1943 still in Iran with 23rd Cavalry Division (Soviet Union) and smaller units. Disbanded May 1945.
- 16th Cavalry Corps (Soviet Union) - 4 January 1942, disbanded? March 1942.
- 17th Cavalry Corps (Soviet Union) - June–August 1942, converted to 4th Guards Cavalry Corps.
- 18th Cavalry Corps (Soviet Union) - August 1942, disbanded August 1943.
- 19th Cavalry Corps (Soviet Union) - February 1943, disbanded July 1943.

In connection with the great vulnerability of cavalry from artillery fire, air strikes and tanks, the number of cavalry corps was reduced to 8 on 1 September 1943.

== Guards Cavalry Corps (Gv.kk) ==
- 1st Guards Cavalry Corps - 26 November 1941 and (2nd Cavalry Corps)
- 2nd Guards Cavalry Corps - 25 December 1942 (3rd Cavalry Corps)
- 3rd Guards Cavalry Corps - 25 December 1941 (5th Cavalry Corps)
- 4th Guards Cavalry Corps - 27 August 1942 (17th Cavalry Corps) - operated with Cavalry mechanized groups in 1944–45, destroyed as part of Cavalry-mechanized Group Pliyev at the Battle of Debrecen, fought during Budapest, Bratislava-Brno, and Prague Offensives.
- 5th Guards Cavalry Corps - 20 November 1942 - created at Kizlyar by an order of the Stavka VGK for inclusion in the Transcaucasus Front. Consisted of the 11th Guards 'Don' Cossack Cavalry Division, 12th Guards 'Don' Cossack Cavalry Division, and 63rd Cavalry Division. Participated in Iassy-Kishinev Offensive, Battle of Debrecen, Budapest Offensive, and Vienna Offensive.
- 6th Guards Cavalry Corps - 19 January 1943 (7th Cavalry Corps)
- 7th Guards Cavalry Corps - 14 February 1943 (8th Cavalry Corps)

In the second half of the 20th century the cavalry corps in the Soviet Army disbanded, the last cavalry division in 1955.

== Cavalry Groups ==
- Pavel Belov's Cavalry Group
- Batskelevich Cavalry Group
- Kuliev Cavalry Group
- Donbass Cavalry Group
- Dovator's Cavalry Group
- Mishulin's Cavalry Group

== Composition ==
At the beginning of the war, Red Army cavalry corps had 2–3 cavalry (or mountain cavalry) divisions in each. In the corps was:

- Personnel
  - More than 19,000 soldiers
- Horse
  - 16,000 horses
- Basic weapons and equipment
  - 128 tanks
  - 44 armored cars
  - 64 field, 32 anti-tank and 40 anti-aircraft guns
  - 128 mortars

During the war the battle of the cavalry corps has been significantly strengthened, it began to enter:

- 3rd Cavalry Division
- Self-propelled artillery, anti-tank artillery and anti-aircraft artillery regiments
- Guards Mortar Regiment Rocket artillery
- Mortar and separate anti-tank battalions.

== See also ==
- Mechanised corps (Soviet Union)
- Rifle corps (Soviet Union)
- Pavel Belov
- Lev Dovator
- Issa Pliyev
- Viktor Kirillovich Baranov
