= 1st Guards Cavalry Corps =

Unit of the Soviet Red Army

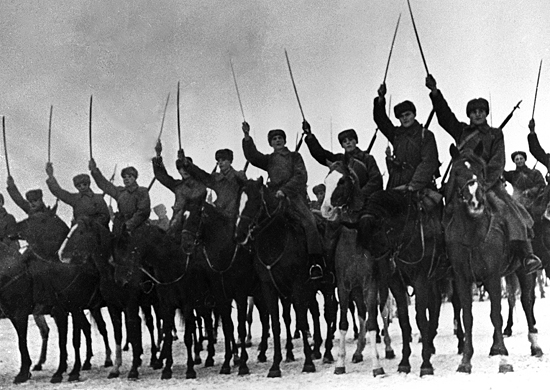
- Active: 1941 – July 1946
- Country: Soviet Union
- Branch: Cavalry
- Type: Mobile unit
- Size: 18,000
- Nickname: Fire squad
- Engagements: World War Two: Operation Barbarossa; Operation Typhoon; Battle of Moscow; Battle of Rzhev-Vyazma; Kozelsk offensive; Operation Hannover; Third Battle of Kharkov; Second Battle of Kiev; Zhitomir–Berdichev offensive; Dnieper-Carpathian Offensive; Lvov–Sandomierz offensive; Sandomierz–Silesian offensive; Vistula-Oder Offensive; Battle of Berlin; Prague offensive
- Battle honours: Zhytomyr

Commanders
- Notable commanders: Pavel Belov; Viktor Kirillovich Baranov

1st Guards Cavalry Zhytomyr Red Banner Corps (Russian: 1-й гвардейский кавалерийский Житомирский Краснознаменный корпус) was a military unit of the Soviet Red Army which was renamed from the 2nd Cavalry Corps. Led by Pavel Belov it was involved in several colossal combat operations during World War II, with its most stupendous accomplishments seen during the Battle of Moscow.

Despite being a cavalry unit, the guards have a long and robust history of successful warfare among all allied units. The cavalry men proved themselves as valuable units from the early days of Operation Barbarossa until the last days of the war. Belov's group was the first major formation to successfully push the Germans back during the counter-offensive of the Battle of Moscow. By 1942, the unit had its reputation as the "Fire Squad" from Stalin himself. During the Battle of Rzhev-Vyazma the Cavalry Corps was among the few units to break through the German lines, leaving most of the heavy weapons behind. As a result, despite many difficulties, they achieved the longest successful raid of the Second World War, surpassing the besieged 62nd Army (Soviet Union) at Stalingrad.

By the second half of the war, the cavalrymen who often spearheaded the front of the 1st Ukrainian Front were able to make even more significant breakthroughs behind enemy lines using the advanced Cavalry mechanized group, which resulted in a faster enemy line collapse. In January 1945, the guards who at the time fought with the 60th Army helped in its liberation of Auschwitz. After continuing its drive towards Berlin it was redirected south, occupying Dresden. The 1st Cavalry Corps met with the Americans on the Elbe River in late April 1945. By the end of the war just the 2nd Guards Cavalry division, which by then counted eighteen Heroes of the Soviet Union, liberated two camps and taken over 16,000 German prisoners along with much equipment over the month of April. Their commander Mamsurov, Hadji-Umar Dzhiorovich, for his accomplishments in the war, would participate in the Moscow Victory Parade of 1945. By the end of the war, the guards became one of the most decorated and accomplished units of the Red Army.

== Organization ==
By order of the NCO No. 342 of November 26, 1941, the 2nd Cavalry Corps named after The Council of People's Commissars of the Ukrainian SSR was transformed into the 1st Guards Cavalry Corps. The 5th Cavalry Division was transformed into the 1st Guards Cavalry Division and the 9th Cavalry Division into the 2nd Guards Cavalry Division. By mid-1942, the 7th Guards Cavalry Division became the 3rd core division of the Corps, with 143rd Guards Fighter Anti-Tank Regiment joining in mid-1943. The corps consisted of 5 cavalry divisions at the time of the raid which included the 3 divisions from the 10th Cavalry Corps, the 41st Cavalry Division, 57th Cavalry Division, and the 75th Cavalry Division. It can be derived that the corps had approximately 18000 personnel, 15000 horses, 120 tanks, and 140 artillery guns, based on the size of a typical cavalry unit at corps strength in the Soviet Red Army during the Second World War.

Body composition: (as of May 1, 1945)

1st Guards Cavalry Stavropol Order of Lenin, Red Banner, Order of Suvorov and Bogdan Khmelnitsky Division

61st Tank Zhytomyr Red Banner Regiment (from September 26, 1943);

2nd Guards Cavalry Crimean Order of Lenin, Red Banner twice, Order of Bohdan Khmelnytsky Division

230th Tank Regiment (from October 8, 1943, to December 30, 1943);

58th Tank Katowice Order of Bohdan Khmelnytsky Regiment (since May 22, 1944);

7th Guards Cavalry Zhytomyr Red Banner, Order of Suvorov and Bogdan Khmelnitsky Division

87th Tank Zhytomyr Red Banner Regiment (from September 29, 1943);

1244th Self-propelled Artillery Przemysl Order of Alexander Nevsky Regiment (from March 1944 to May 1945)

1461st self-propelled artillery Zhytomyr Red Banner Regiment (October 1943-January 1944)

143rd Guards Fighter-anti-tank Artillery Zhytomyr[2] Red Banner Regiment;

1st Separate Guards Fighter-anti-tank Order of the Red Star[3] division;

49th Separate Guards Mortar Division;

1st Guards Mortar Zhytomyr Red Banner Regiment of Rocket Artillery;

319th Anti-aircraft Artillery Katowice[4] Order of Bohdan Khmelnytsky Regiment;

1st separate Guards anti-aircraft battery

Parts of the corps subordination:

1st Separate Guards Order of the Red Star[3]Communications Division (until May 1, 1942 – 10th Separate Communications Division);

187th separate motor transport battalion;

349th field auto repair base;

256th laundry squad;

27th field car factory;

1561st military postal station.

In operational subordination:

436th Fighter Aviation Regiment in the period from January 18, 1942, to February 4, 1942, on I-16 aircraft

28th Mixed Aviation Division between December 25, 1941, and January 25, 1942

== Defensive Operations in Moscow 1941 ==
=== Holding Tula ===
On 14 October 1941, the German Army Group Centre resumed its offensive operations against the Soviet capital city of Moscow and merely 4 days later two crucial fortified regions of Mozhaisk and Maloyaroslavets were captured. Following that, Naro-Fominsk was seized on the 21st and on the 27th, the greatly defended city which sat on the Volga reservoir, Volokolamsk, was subsequently annexed. By then, the only city which remained in the hands of the Soviet Red Army on the Mozhaisk Defense Line was the city of Tula. On 29 October, the 2nd Panzer Group under Generaloberst Heinz Wilhelm Guderian advanced towards Tula upon orders from the Oberkommando des Heer(OKH), the German Army High Command, and a few days prior Tula was already declared to be in a state of siege.

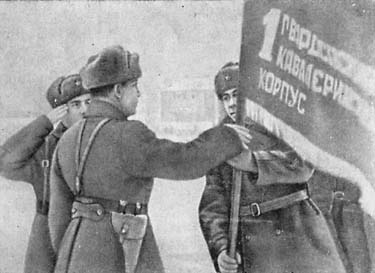
Soviet Cavalrymen of the 2nd Cavalry Corps receiving the honorary "Guards" title, 26 November 1941

In order to hold Tula, which was a city that was essential to the Soviet war efforts against the Wehrmacht's Army Group Center in its push towards Moscow, the STAVKA High Command ordered the 2nd Cavalry Corps under the command of Major General Pavel Alexeyevich Belov, with its flanks reinforced by the 10th, 49th and 50th Armies to defend the city. The mobile horsemen of the cavalry corps, which primarily served as dismounted infantrymen as the cavalry soldiers of the Eastern Front during World War Two would, conventionally, dismount from their horses and conceal them in safe positions before storming the battlefield as riflemen. The combined efforts of the cavalry corps and the several Soviet armies were capable of repelling Guderian's strikes towards Tula, and on 31 October Generalfeldmarschall Walther von Brauchitsch, the Head of OKH, ordered that offensive operations against Moscow as part of the strategic Operation Typhoon be ceased due to logistical problems and supply shortages as winter approached, considering that the supply lines could not be further stretched and have efforts overly exerted upon their military culminating point.

=== Battles around Kashira ===
On 18 November 1941, the OKH issued an order for Generaloberst Heinz Guderian's 2nd Panzer Group to bypass Tula and drive towards Kashira, a strategic stronghold located 120 kilometers southwest of Moscow and 80 kilometers northeast of Tula. Kashira was of paramount significance as not only did it serve as the headquarters of the Soviet Western Front, but also as the only significant barricade left between the 2nd Panzer Group and the Soviet capital. Should Kashira fall, Moscow would inevitably be seized by the Wehrmacht. The 2nd Panzer Group swept formidably through Venev and were storming towards Kashira at a rapid pace, motivated by the unwavering blitzkrieg spirit.

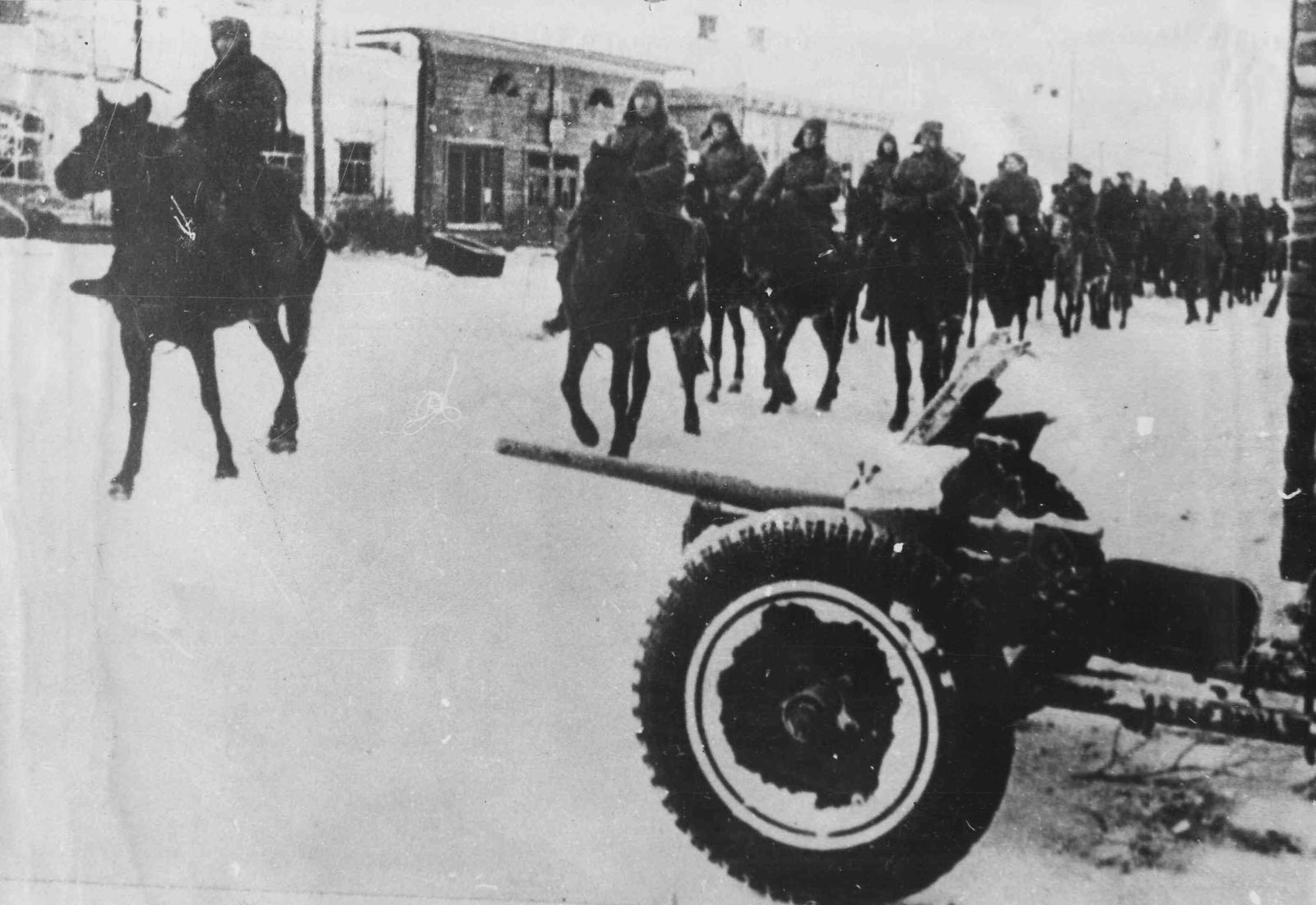
Horsemen of the 1st Guards Cavalry Corps riding victoriously during the Moscow Counteroffensive Phase, 22 December 1941

In a desperate attempt to defend against the German onslaught, the STAVKA High Command hurled the 2nd Cavalry Corps under the command of Major General Pavel Belov, later renamed the 1st Guards Cavalry Corps on 26 November, the 112th Tank Division led by General Andrei Getman, an armored brigade, a battalion of BM-13 Katyusha rocket launchers and air support at the armoured beasts of the 2nd Panzer Group. The cavalrymen of the 1st Guards Cavalry Corps were armed primarily with the SVT-40 semi-automatic battle rifle and the Cossack shashka, which was the traditional sabre of the Cossack horsemen. The cavalrymen, along with the T34 and KV1 tanks wielded by the 112th Tank Division battled ferociously against the Panzer IIIs and Panzer IVs of the 2nd Panzer Group, and the Soviet units were launching powerful strikes against the German formations as envisaged by the Deep Battle doctrine, whereby an earthshaking artillery barrage would commence to shatter and thoroughly demoralize the frontal forces of the opponent prior to the assault and subsequent exploitation by the mobile units which, in this case, were the cavalrymen of the 1st Guards Cavalry Corps and tankmen from the 112th Tank Division. After a vicious fight had ensued, the 1st Guards Cavalry Corps and 112th Tank Division's combined efforts proved to be extremely effective, repelling the 2nd Panzer Group back by 40 kilometers, towards the town of Mordves.

Since that clash between the Soviet mobile troops and the 2nd Panzer in the vicinity of Kashira, the ability of the German forces located south in the Tula Oblast to conduct a thrust north towards Moscow was greatly hampered, resulting in the attacks by the 2nd Panzer Group towards the heart of the Soviet state to eventually be stalled. Thus, the 1st Guards Cavalry Corps held not just Kashira, but also hindered the Germans' capability of conducting a thrust towards Moscow in the south, saving Moscow and the Western Front from capitulation, which adequately demonstrated the fighting abilities of the valiant cavalrymen of the corps who were unflinching in battle.

== Moscow Counteroffensive Phase: Pushing back the Panzers ==
=== Defeating Guderian ===
On 5 December 1941, the State Defence Committee, also known as the GKO, issued an order for the counteroffensive against Army Group Center to commence. It was on the same day that the 1st Guards Cavalry Corps and 9th Tank Brigade, with their flanks supported by the infantrymen of the 332nd Rifle Division, 10th and 50th Armies, mounted a powerful assault on General Heinz Guderian's 2nd Panzer Group. The courage and combat effectiveness of the cavalry corps were unmatched, and the panzer group, which had been plagued with logistical issues as well as problems that arose along with the harsh winter, including the rampant growth in numbers of soldiers getting frostbites and tank's engines and fuels freezing, was already incapable of wielding the colossal armored power which it had once possessed against the opponents. Guderian's panzers were subdued spectacularly by the horsemen of the 1st Guards Cavalry Corps, tankmen of the 9th Tank Brigade, and the supporting infantry. This allowed General Pavel Belov to liberate numerous towns, including the crucial town of Stalinogorsk, which had fallen into the hands of the 2nd Panzer Group on 21 November.

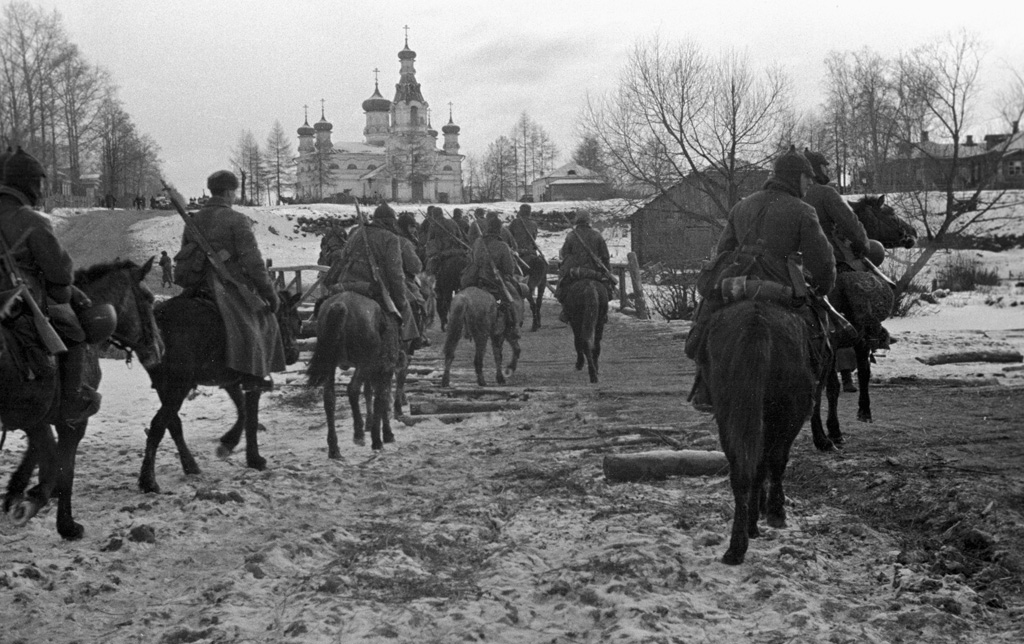
Soviet cavalrymen, presumably soldiers of the corps, entering a liberated town.

As the 1st Guards Cavalry Corps continued advancing with much impetus, Guderian's forces were being pushed back rapidly. Later, the "panzer leader" requested permission to withdraw his forces to prevent further losses from being sustained, but it was turned down. Due to the fact that the cavalry corps were proclaiming an overwhelming number of victories over the German panzers, the disappointed and infuriated Fuhrer of the Third Reich, Adolf Hitler, summoned Guderian back to the base of Wolfsschanze in East Prussia on 20 December, and subsequently relieved him of his command on Christmas Day 1941. In this battle, the cavalry corps completely and swiftly subdued and repelled the once victorious 2nd Panzer Group which was commanded by the inventor of modern armored warfare and swept ferociously across the Russian steppe. This was indeed, not just one of the corps' greatest achievements but also that of the entire Red Army of the Soviet Union.

== General Offensive Phase: 7 January to 20 April 1942 ==
=== Cutting the Minsk-Moscow Highway ===
On 7 January 1942, the General Secretary of the Soviet Communist Party, Joseph Stalin. announced the end of the Moscow Counteroffensive Phase and the commencement of the General Offensive. He possessed much anticipation for the Red Army to carry on the momentum and conduct an offensive that would pierce straight into German occupied land. An operational group was formed to first cut the Minsk-Moscow Highway, which was of the utmost importance to the German logistical system. The group comprised the 1st Guards Cavalry Corps, 33rd Army, 11th Cavalry Corps and the 4th Airborne Corps.

The group swung north and fought against the mighty 9th Army under Generaloberst Walther Model, and after much fighting, the 1st Guards Cavalry gradually gained the upper hand. On 27 January, the Minsk-Moscow highway had been successfully severed, cutting off one of the essential lifelines of the Wehrmacht. After that, the group was then ordered to attempt to encircle and destroy the German 9th Army, an operation which soon proved to be overly ambitious and would later result in a terrible defeat.

=== Rzhev-Vyazma: Hideous Defeat and the Great Raid ===
Upon severing the Minsk-Moscow highway, the 1st Guards Cavalry Corps, 33rd Army and 11th Cavalry Corps were ordered to annihilate the Wehrmacht's 9th Army commanded by the master of a defensive battle, Colonel General Walther Model. The directive of the Western Front Command dated January 2, 1942, stated: "A very favorable situation has been created for the encirclement of the enemy's 4th and 9th armies, and the main role should be played by the Belov strike group, promptly interacting through the front headquarters with our Rzhev grouping." However, quite unexpectedly for Major General Pavel Belov, the 9th Army was able to perform a counter-encirclement of the group, trapping the Soviet soldiers inside a pocket, cutting them off from the rest of the forces of the Western Front. Belov's corps did not enter the breakthrough in its entirety. Two rifle divisions remained behind the Warsaw highway, all tanks, almost all artillery, and rear services stayed behind.

The corps, therefore, consisted of the 1st and 2nd Guards, 41, 57, and 75th Cavalry Divisions, as well as several ski battalions. The three-light raid cavalry divisions formed by the abbreviated states of 1941 were much weaker than the guard divisions: 41st number 1291 people, 57th – 1706 people, 75th – 2760 people. According to various sources, ski battalions had from 800 to 2 thousand people. Thus, the corps totaled about 19,000 people. Fierce battles ensued, and the Soviets inside the envelope faced overwhelming defeat, with the 33rd Army being annihilated entirely. The commander of the army, General Mikhail Yefremov, committed suicide to evade capitulation on realizing that he was incapable of carrying on the fight. Besides that, the 11th Cavalry Corps had also been segregated from the 1st Guards Cavalry Corps and subsequently obliterated as well, leaving only the 1st Guards Cavalry as the surviving unit inside the encirclement. In this battle, heavy casualties were inflicted upon the Red Army for the severe miscalculations and errors in the decisions implemented prior to the clash. The situation was aggravated by the lack of a unified command of the operation. Unfortunately, the forces of Army Group Center in the area of the ledge were greatly underestimated. The fascists recovered from the consequences of the battle for Moscow and managed to create a solid defense, especially in settlements and in communications. Breakthroughs that included strike groups were closed by the enemy with flanking attacks. The shock groups were in an extremely difficult situation. Lack of supply and replenishment, lack of heavy weapons, low mobility of rifle divisions, harsh climatic conditions – all this made the task almost impossible.

With no other options, General Pavel Belov had to continue roaming behind the enemy lines with his horsemen. As a cunning commander who wielded exceptional strategic ingenuity, Belov was able to lead his cavalry and launch numerous raids behind the enemy lines, disrupting supply routes and mounting ambushes and sudden attacks against groups of German soldiers. After the corps rolled away from Vyazma, Belov decided to proceed with semi-partisan actions. The most important task was the supply of combat units and the treatment of the wounded. It was necessary to prepare the area and space for a new deployment of the corps. This area became a partisan region from Germination to Dorogobuzh. The corps received replenishment of more than 11 thousand people as they joined its regiments and squadrons. This was further made possible as a significant amount of weapons and ammunition remained in the surrounding forests after the Red Army retreated in the fall of 1941.

The German OKH had long plotted the destruction of the corps and deployed more than 7 divisions in an attempt to destroy the cavalry unit. However, the 1st Guards Cavalry Corps managed to avoid much interaction and conflict with German forces, while effectively operating within the occupied territories. The corps, emerged in the forests of Kirov and made a breakthrough to link with the main Red Army forces and continue the fight against the Wehrmacht. The Head of the German OKH, Generalfeldmarschall Franz Halder, was so impressed and stunned by the raid that he gave Belov the nickname "Fox", symbolizing the corps' ability to survive behind the enemy lines after an extremely terrible defeat and launch blows of lightning speeds against the forces in the rear.

In the Battles of Rzhev, the influence of personality-focused historiography in history is demonstrated. Having almost the same conditions and operational situation, only Belov, of all the generals who were surrounded by the enemy, acted decisively through maneuver warfare and use of the terrain, which is how the horsemen routed the enemy with great success.

After its recovery of the raid, the Guards were sent to help the 16th Army in its next offensive. During the next 2 weeks perseverance, heroism, and courage in defensive battles were shown by the units of the 1st Guards. The horsemen suffered the heaviest blows from the 11th and 20th Panzer divisions of the enemy, who tried to break through to Dretovo, Kozelsk, Kaluga. The corps, being at the junction of the 16th Army (Soviet Union) and the 61st Army (Soviet Union), took the brunt of the German grouping and prevented its breakthrough to Sukhinichi, Kozelsk and Kaluga, having completed the task assigned to it. In continuous heavy fighting, the corps, together with infantry and tank units, inflicted heavy losses on the enemy in manpower and equipment, upset and weakened him, and forced him to go on the defensive on the Southern bank of the Zhizdra River. Having regrouped forces and put himself in order, the corps launched a counteroffensive and, together with other units of the 16th Army, pushed the enemy 5–10 km South of the Zhizdra River, providing the necessary springboard for the future on advance. Total losses from August 12 to September 8 of the corps during the operation amounted to 10457 people killed and wounded, 2,915 horses, 41 guns, 119 mortars. On September 9, the corps was withdrawn to reserve 16 Army in the area of Yu-z Sukhinichi. On September 28, it moved to the Western Front reserve. In early October, the first marching squadrons arrived as replacements, rest and combat training of the division lasted until January 29, 1943.

== Third Battle of Kharkov and Liberation of Ukraine ==
At the end of January 1943, The Corps was transferred to the South-Western Front and from February 5, was included in the 6th Army. From March 16, it joined the 3rd Tank Army as part of the offensive operation in the Donbas, fighting Italian forces in the Kharkov direction. The Corps was desperately trying to help the encircled units within the city. However, having surrounded and occupied Kharkov, the German troops continued to develop their offensive in the northern direction towards Belgorod. The SS Panzer Corps divisions "2nd SS Panzer Division Das Reich" and "Death's Head" 3rd SS Panzer Division Totenkopf came out to the corps positions, heavy fighting ensued. The fighting was so intense that by mid-March, the 1st Guards Cavalry Division counted 1006 persons, 8-76mm, 4-45mm guns, 6-82mm, 8-50mm mortars. The 2nd guards cavalry division fared a little better having 1489 soldiers remaining with 6-76mm, 5-45mm guns, 7-82mm, 28-50mm mortars. The 7th guards' cavalry division had 941 men with 4-76mm, 4-45mm guns, 1-82mm, 17 -mortars. Losses in the battles at Sinelnikovo, Lozovaya and Balakleya amounted to 3474 people, 3394 horses, 18-76 mm, 13-45 m, 14-82 m, 53-50mm mortars.

In the second half of April–August, the Corps was in the reserve of the Southwestern Front and did not participate in the Battle of Kursk. In early September, it was transferred to the Voronezh, from October 20, 1943, to the 1st Ukrainian Front. Here they again the unit proved itself by crossing the river Dnepr and taking part in the Kyiv offensive operation, which resulted in the liberation of the Ukrainian capital. As the battle progressed a big initiative was made possible by the horsemen persuading the Germans into the industrial city of Zhitomer. For its role in the battles during the liberation of the city of Zhitomir, the 2nd Guards Cavalry Division was awarded the second Order of the Red Banner (November 13, 1943). As the situation became critical for the Germans as they brought Panzer forces and on November 20 they retook the city. It would take the Red Army another offense and on January 14 the city was retaken by the Red Army, thus Zhitomer became the only city to get saluted two separate times by Moscow through the war.

== Liberation of Europe and Germany ==
After its liberation of Ukraine, the 1st Guards cavalry Corps which was part of the 1st Ukrainian Front entered Poland during the Lvov–Sandomierz offensive. As the 1st Ukrainian Front was spearheading the whole Eastern theater the Corps participated in the Sandomierz–Silesian offensive reaching the Oder river. By early January the Red Army was ready to make its major offensive into Germany. During the Vistula–Oder offensive the Cavalry Corps crossed the bridgehead with its tanks and pursued the enemy, In late January the Corps joined the 60th Army, which liberated Auschwitz. As the horsemen marched towards Germany the Corps was able to liberate two additional concentration camps, freeing over 16,000 prisoners. During the Battle of Berlin the Corps advancing on the Capital, however, 40 kilometers from Berlin it was ordered to change direction and head south to capture Dresden and come to the Elbe river to meet with the Allies. For its bravery many divisions were awarded high unit awards with the 2nd cavalry division receiving its first Order of Lenin award, which is the highest award given to a Red Army unit. The Corps finished the war in the last major battle. The corps finished the war in the Czech capital, Prague in May 1945.

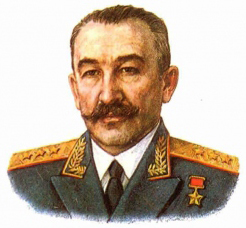
Major General Pavel Belov, commander of the 1st Guards Cavalry Corps during the Battle of Moscow and Battle of Rzhev-Vyazma

== Commanders ==
- Major General Pavel Alexeyevich Belov (26 November 1941 – 28 June 1942)
- Guard Lieutenant General Viktor Kirillovich Baranov (29 June 1942 – 11 May 1945)

== Heroes of the Soviet Union ==
Guard Lieutenant General Viktor Kirillovich Baranov

1st Guards Cavalry Division – 9 people

2nd Guards Cavalry Division – 18 people

7th Guards Cavalry Division – 7 people

143rd separate guards anti-tank artillery regiment: 1 person

Total:36

In all nearly 30,000 soldiers and officers of the 1st Guards Cavalry Corps were awarded government awards.

== Engagement ==
- Operation Barbarossa
  - Operation Typhoon
  - Battle of Moscow
  - Battle of Rzhev-Vyazma
  - Kozelsk offensive
  - Operation Hannover
  - Third Battle of Kharkov
  - Second Battle of Kiev
  - Zhitomir–Berdichev offensive
  - Dnieper-Carpathian Offensive
  - Lvov–Sandomierz offensive
  - Sandomierz–Silesian offensive
  - Vistula-Oder Offensive
  - Battle of Berlin
  - Prague offensive

== See also ==
- Lev Dovator
- Pavel Belov
- Issa Pliev
- Alexey Selivanov
- Viktor Baranov
- Georgy Zhukov
- Heinz Guderian
- 2nd Panzer Group
