= Viktor Kirillovich Baranov =

Soviet general

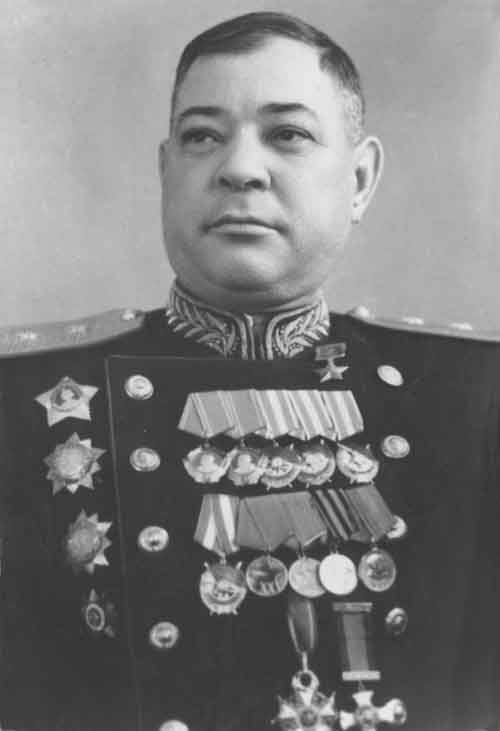
- Baranov in 1945
- Born: 11 June 1901; Sheremetyevka, Syzransky Uyezd, Simbirsk Governorate, Russian Empire
- Died: 26 July 1970 (aged 69); Dnepropetrovsk, Ukrainian SSR, Soviet Union
- Military career
- Allegiance: Russian SFSR; Soviet Union
- Branch: Red Army (later Soviet Army)
- Service years: 1918–1953
- Rank: Lieutenant general
- Commands: 5th Cavalry Division (became 1st Guards Cavalry Division); 1st Guards Cavalry Corps; 14th Guards Rifle Corps
- Conflicts: Russian Civil War; Basmachi Revolt; World War II
- Awards: Hero of the Soviet Union; Order of Lenin (2); Order of the Red Banner (4); Order of Suvorov, 1st class; Order of Bogdan Khmelnitsky, 1st class (2); Order of the Patriotic War, 1st class

Viktor Kirillovich Baranov (Russian: Виктор Кириллович Баранов; 11 June 1901 – 26 July 1970) was a Soviet Army lieutenant general and a Hero of the Soviet Union.

Baranov joined the Red Army during the Russian Civil War and served as a cavalryman. He spent the 1920s and early 1930s fighting in the suppression of the Basmachi movement, rising to squadron command. At the outbreak of Operation Barbarossa he commanded the 5th Cavalry Division, which was converted into the 1st Guards Cavalry Division in recognition of its actions. Baranov commanded the division during the raid into the German rear area of the 1st Guards Cavalry Corps and succeeded to command of the corps after the end of the raid. He led the corps for the rest of the war, and commanded a cavalry-mechanized group during the Lvov–Sandomierz Offensive. Made a Hero of the Soviet Union for his leadership of the corps in the final stages of the war, Baranov held corps command postwar and retired in the early 1950s.

== Early life and Russian Civil War ==
Born to a peasant family on 11 June 1901 in the village of Sheremetyevka, Kanadeyevskoy volost, Syzransky Uyezd, Simbirsk Governorate, Baranov received three years of education. He worked in a cotton mill at Fedchenko in Uzbekistan from November 1917. After the October Revolution, he joined a Red Guards detachment and fought in the suppression of the nationalist Kokand Autonomy, after which he was seconded to Arys to guard depots.

Joining the Zhlobin Revolutionary Regiment of the Red Army in March 1918, Baranov fought in battles against the White Orenburg Cossacks of Alexander Dutov. As a platoon commander of the regiment, he fought on the Trans-Caspian Front against British troops and White forces from July. After the regiment was shifted to the Turkestan Front in October, Baranov transferred to the 1st Orenburg Consolidated Cavalry Regiment in April 1919, serving as a platoon commander in fighting against the Basmachi movement in Fergana Oblast. He was contused in battle in 1918.

== Interwar period ==
Appointed chief of a post of the 31st Border Squadron of the Cheka Troops at Kushka in December 1920, Baranov was seconded to study at the Turkestan Front Riders' Cavalry School in October 1921, and after graduation in August 1922 transferred to the 15th Alma-Ata Cavalry Courses in Tashkent. With a consolidated cadet detachment, Baranov fought in the suppression of Basmachi in Western and Eastern Bukhara. After another transfer in December to the 4th Combined Military School in Tashkent, he fought against Basmachi in Ablyksky District between May and November 1923. Expelled from the school on 28 December 1924, Baranov was sent to the 7th Turkestan Cavalry Brigade in Baysun, where he was appointed an assistant platoon commander in the 79th Cavalry Regiment.

After leading a flying detachment of the regiment against the Basmachi of Ibrahim Bek, Baranov was transferred in July 1926 to the 81st Cavalry Regiment at Termez, where he became a political instructor in the regimental supply detachment after joining the Communist Party. During this period, he was seconded to the 83rd Cavalry Regiment to fight against the Basmachi of Junaid Khan in the Karakum Desert between August and December 1927, then between April and June 1928 returned to the 81st Cavalry Regiment to fight against the Basmachi of Utan Bek, and between March and May 1929 commanded a squadron of the 82nd Cavalry Regiment against the Basmachi of Faizal Maksum. For his "courage in battle" against the Basmachi, Baranov was awarded the Order of the Red Banner on 1 August 1929.

Studying at the Novocherkassk Cavalry Commanders' Improvement Courses from 9 November 1929, Baranov returned to the 81st Regiment after completing them on 1 June 1930. With the regiment, he served as a squadron political officer and squadron commander in renewed fighting against Basmachi in Tajikistan, Uzbekistan, and Turkmenistan. Appointed chief of the regimental school of the Tajik Cavalry Regiment in July 1932, Baranov later became regimental chief of staff. Sent to study at the Frunze Military Academy in June 1934, after graduation he became chief of the 1st section of the staff of the 18th Turkmen Mountain Cavalry Division in December 1937. Serving as acting commander of the 27th Turkmen Mountain Cavalry Regiment from March 1938, Baranov, then a major, was appointed assistant commander of the 3rd Cavalry Division of the Kiev Special Military District in Zholkev. He became commander of the 5th Cavalry Division of the 2nd Cavalry Corps in March 1941.

== World War II ==
After Operation Barbarossa began on 22 June 1941, Baranov led the division as part of the 9th Army of the Southern Front in battles on the Prut in the area of Cahul, Fălciu, and Leovo, and conducted a fighting retreat to Kotovsk, Voznesensk, Novaya Odessa, and subsequently to the Dnieper, Novomoskovsk, Bogodukhov, Belgorod, and Korocha. He was promoted to major general on 24 July 1941. In late October it was transferred to the vicinity of Moscow with the corps, fighting in the area of Serpukhov and Kashira during the Battle of Moscow. For its actions, the division became the 1st Guards Cavalry Division on 26 November, while the corps became the 1st Guards Cavalry Corps. At the end of January, the corps was sent on a raid into the German rear along the Warsaw Highway and for five months remained behind German lines in Smolensk Oblast together with airborne units. After returning to Soviet lines, Baranov became commander of the corps on 10 July 1942 and led it for the rest of the war.

Baranov led the corps as part of the Western, Southwestern, Voronezh, and 1st Ukrainian Fronts in the Voroshilovgrad Offensive, the Third Battle of Kharkov, the Donbass Offensive, the Battle of Kiev, and the Zhitomir–Berdichev, Rovno–Lutsk, Proskurov–Chernovitsy, Lvov–Sandomierz, Eastern Carpathian, Vistula–Oder, Lower Silesian, Upper Silesian, Berlin, and Prague Offensives. He was promoted to lieutenant general on 15 September 1943. The corps was particularly distinguished in the capture of Zhitomir on 13 November 1943, receiving the name of the city as an honorific, and Baranov received the Order of the Red Banner for his leadership. During the Lvov–Sandomierz Offensive in July and August 1944, Baranov commanded a cavalry-mechanized group composed of his corps and the 25th Tank Corps. 1st Ukrainian Front commander Marshal of the Soviet Union Ivan Konev described him as a "brave and strong-willed general" in a December 1944 assessment, but tempered his praise by noting that Baranov was "insufficiently decisive and only fulfilled his assigned missions with the prodding of the front military council" during the Lvov–Sandomierz Offensive. For "successful completion of combat missions and the high combat efficiency of the corps," Baranov received the title of Hero of the Soviet Union and the Order of Lenin on 29 May 1945.

== Postwar ==
After the end of the war, Baranov was placed at the disposal of the Personnel Department of the Commander-in-Chief of the Cavalry of the Red Army in August 1946, and a month later appointed commander of the 14th Guards Rifle Corps of the Kiev Military District. He completed the one-year Higher Academic Courses at the Voroshilov Higher Military Academy in November 1952 and was transferred to the reserve on 13 April 1953. Baranov died on 26 July 1970 in Dnepropetrovsk, and was buried in the city's Zaporizhke Cemetery.

== Awards and honors ==
Baranov was a recipient of the following awards and decorations:

- Hero of the Soviet Union
- Order of Lenin (2)
- Order of the Red Banner (4)
- Order of Suvorov, 1st class
- Order of Bogdan Khmelnitsky, 1st class (2)
- Order of the Patriotic War, 1st class
- Foreign orders

== See also ==
- Pavel Belov
- Lev Dovator
- Issa Pliyev
