= Operation Hannover =

1942 German military operation

- Part of World War II
Date	April–June 1942
Location	near Vyazma
Result	German victory

Belligerents
Germany	Soviet Union

Commanders and leaders
(Nazi Germany) Walter Model	(Soviet Union) Pavel Belov

Strength
45,000	20,000

Casualties and losses
2,200	10,500, 20,000 taken prisoner

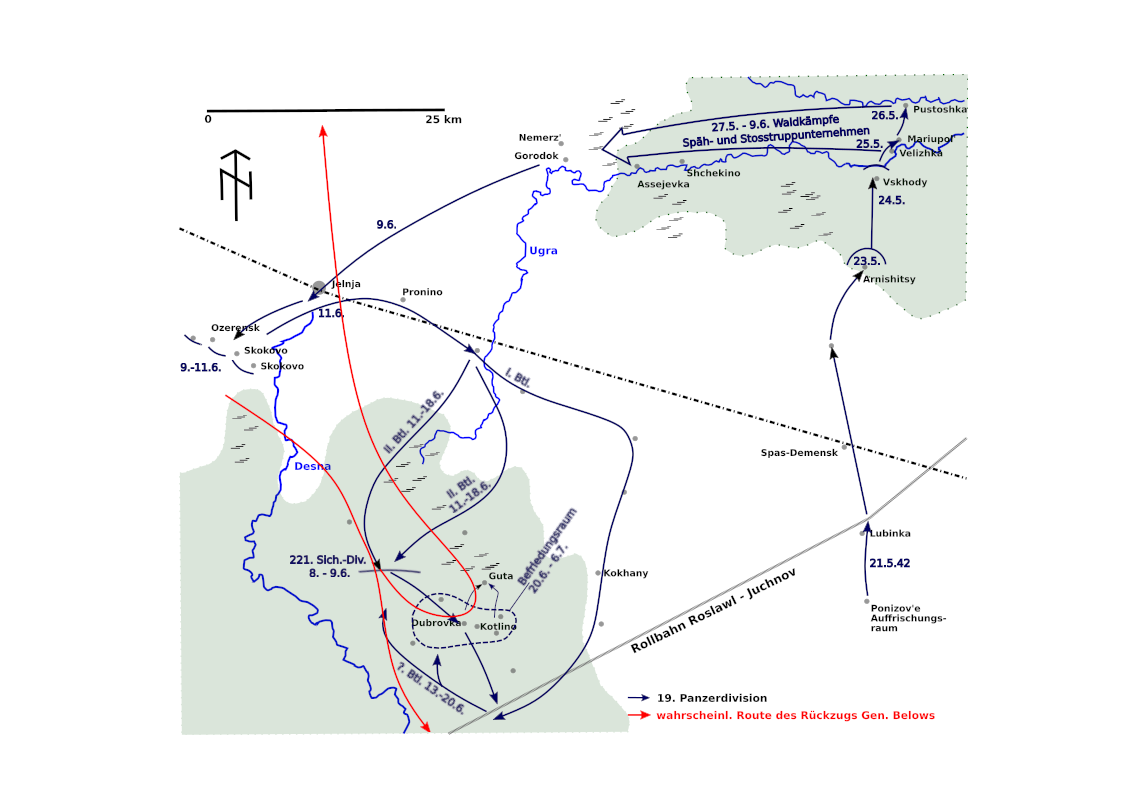
Movements of the 19th Panzer Division during Operation Hannover

Operation Hannover or Operation Hanover (sources vary) was a German operation in April–June 1942 aimed at eliminating Soviet partisans, airborne troops and encircling Red Army soldiers near Vyazma (Smolensk Oblast). The operation was a complete success for the Germans.

== Background ==
Soviet partisans had been disrupting the rear of Army Group Center (and the German 4th Army in particular). In January 1942, they were strengthened by Soviet Airborne Troops (the Vyazma airborne desant operation, part of the Battles of Rzhev). The Soviets hoped that the airborne troops and the partisans would be able to secure territory and disrupt the German logistics long enough for the Soviet offensive to reach them. However, the Red Army offensive involving the 33rd Army and the 1st Guards Cavalry Corps failed to advance far enough and the Germans were able to concentrate on destroying Soviet troops in the rear.

German forces from the 4th Army and the 4th Panzer Army, having stopped the Soviet offensive, engaged airborne troops and partisans. These airborne troops and partisans fought a conventional battle with German forces and sustained a major defeat. The partisan forces in the area were so thoroughly decimated that the Soviets were unable to recreate any significant partisan activity in this region for the remainder of the war. Operation Hannover is seen as the most successful German anti-partisan operation ever; this is attributed primarily to the fact that the partisans decided to challenge the German forces in open battle.

At the same time, Operation Hannover II, near Moscow, resulted in the elimination of encircled Red Army troops (the 39th Army and the 11th Cavalry Corps).
