= Vistula–Oder offensive =

1945 invasion of Nazi-occupied territory by the Red Army during WWII

- Part of the Eastern Front of World War II
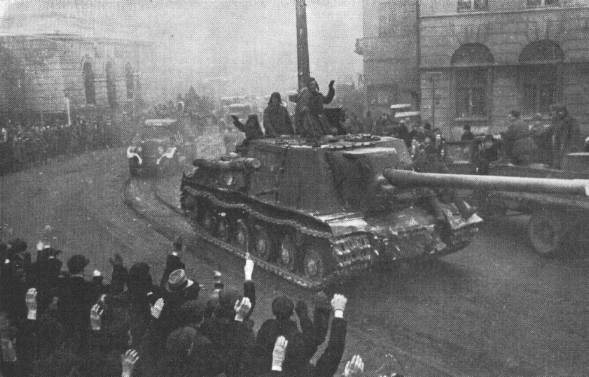
- Soviet troops enter Łódź on 17 January 1945, led by an ISU-122 self-propelled gun
Date	12 January – 2 February 1945 (3 weeks)
Location	Poland and Eastern Germany
Result	Soviet victory; Liberation of Auschwitz and other Nazi concentration camps; Disintegration of the General Government
Territorial changes	Soviet and Polish troops advanced into most of the pre-war Polish territory

Belligerents
Germany (Kingdom of Hungary (1920–1946)) Hungary	Soviet Union; Poland

Commanders and leaders
(Nazi Germany) Ferdinand Schörner (Army Group A) (From 20 January) (Nazi Germany) Josef Harpe (Army Group A) (Until 20 January)	(Soviet Union) Georgy Zhukov (1st Belorussian Front) (Soviet Union) Ivan Konev (1st Ukrainian Front) (Poland) Stanislav Poplavsky (1st Polish Army)

Strength
450,000–800,000 men	2,203,600 men

Casualties and losses
Soviet estimated: 626,000 casualties 295,000 killed 147,000 taken prisoner 189,000 wounded	43,476 killed or missing 150,715 wounded and sick

The Vistula–Oder offensive (Russian: Висло-Одерская операция, romanized: Vislo–Oderskaya operatsiya) was a Red Army operation on the Eastern Front in the European theatre of World War II in January 1945. The army made a major advance into German-held territory, capturing Kraków, Warsaw, and Poznań. The Red Army had built up their strength around a number of key bridgeheads, with two fronts commanded by Marshal Georgy Zhukov and Marshal Ivan Konev. Against them, the German Army Group A, led by Colonel-General Josef Harpe (soon replaced by Colonel-General Ferdinand Schörner), was outnumbered five to one. Within days, German commandants evacuated the concentration camps, sending the prisoners on their death marches to the west, where ethnic Germans also started fleeing. In a little over two weeks, the Red Army had advanced 480 kilometres (300 mi) from the Vistula to the Oder, only 69 kilometres (43 mi) from Berlin, which was undefended. However, Zhukov called a halt, owing to continued German resistance on his northern flank (Pomerania), and the advance on Berlin had to be delayed until April.

== Background ==
In the wake of the successful Operation Bagration, the 1st Belorussian Front managed to secure two bridgeheads west of the Vistula river between 27 July and 4 August 1944. The Soviet forces remained inactive during the failed Warsaw Uprising that started on 1 August, though their frontline was not far from the insurgents. The 1st Ukrainian Front captured an additional large bridgehead at Sandomierz (known as the Baranow bridgehead in German accounts), some 200 km south of Warsaw during the Lvov–Sandomierz offensive.

Preceding the offensive, the Red Army had built up large amounts of materiel and manpower in the three bridgeheads. The Red Army greatly outnumbered the opposing Wehrmacht in infantry, artillery, and armour. All this was known to German intelligence. General Reinhard Gehlen, head of Fremde Heere Ost, passed his assessment to Heinz Guderian. Guderian in turn presented the intelligence results to Adolf Hitler, who refused to believe them, dismissing the apparent Soviet strength as "the greatest imposture since Genghis Khan". Guderian had proposed to evacuate the divisions of Army Group North trapped in the Courland Pocket to the Reich via the Baltic Sea to get the necessary manpower for the defence, but Hitler forbade it. In addition, Hitler commanded that one major operational reserve, the troops of Sepp Dietrich's 6th Panzer Army, be moved to Hungary to support Operation Frühlingserwachen.

The offensive was brought forward from 20 to 12 January because meteorological reports warned of a thaw later in the month, and the tanks needed hard ground for the offensive. It was not done to assist American and British forces during the Battle of the Bulge, as Stalin chose to claim at Yalta.

== Forces involved ==
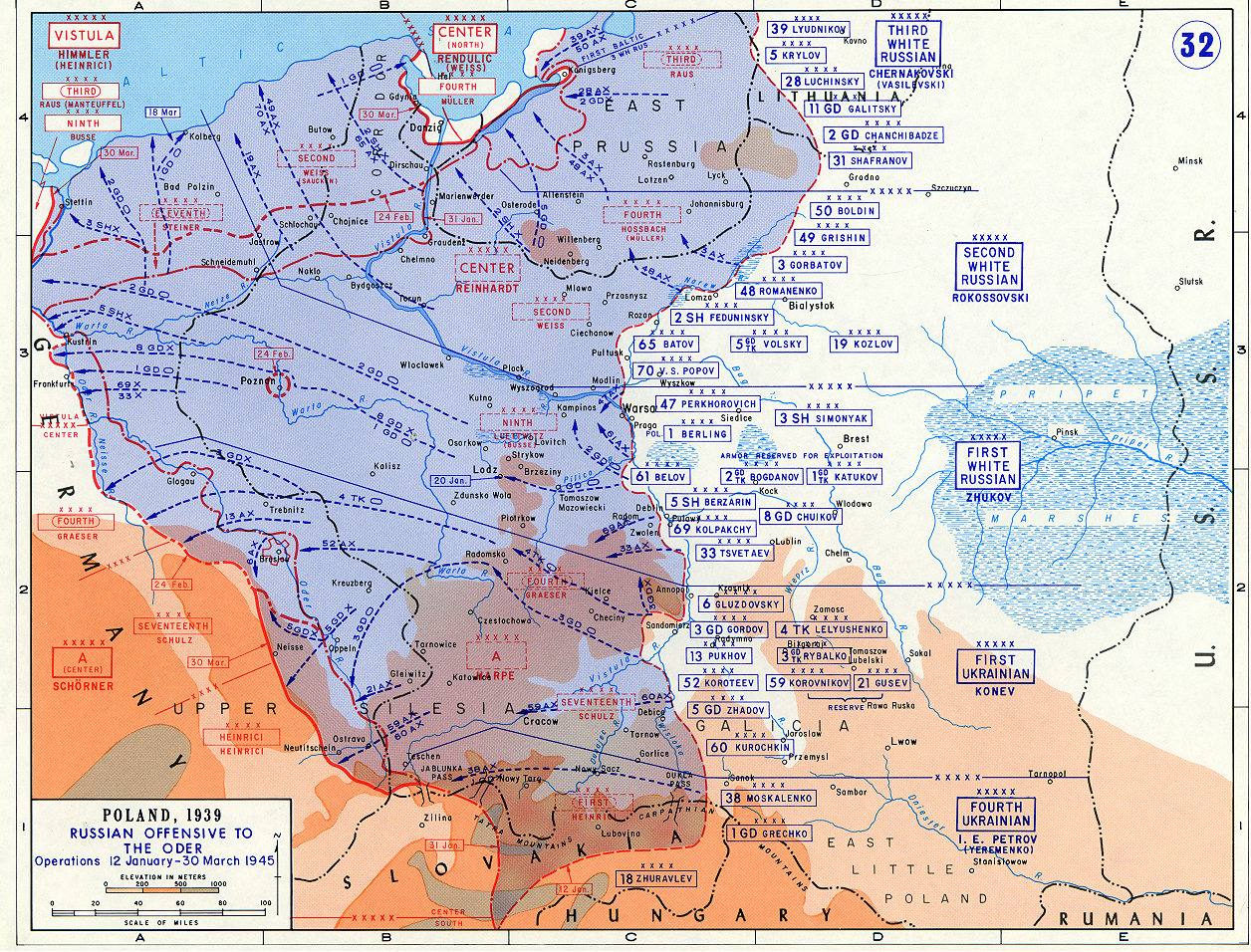
Disposition of forces and advance of the Soviet Army

=== Red Army ===
Two fronts of the Red Army were directly involved. The 1st Belorussian Front, holding the sector around Warsaw and southward in the Magnuszew and Puławy bridgeheads, was led by Marshal Georgy Zhukov; the 1st Ukrainian Front, occupying the Sandomierz bridgehead, was led by Marshal Ivan Konev.

Zhukov and Konev had 163 divisions for the operation with a total of: 2,203,000 infantry, 4,529 tanks, 2,513 assault guns, 13,763 pieces of field artillery (76 mm or more), 14,812 mortars, 4,936 anti-tank guns, 2,198 Katyusha multiple rocket launchers, and 5,000 aircraft.

==== Deployments ====
- 1st Belorussian Front (Marshal Georgy Zhukov)
  - 47th Army (Franz Perkhorovich)
  - 1st Polish Army (General Stanisław Popławski)
  - 3rd Shock Army (Nikolai Simoniak)
  - 61st Army (Pavel Alexeyevich Belov)
  - 1st Guards Tank Army (Mikhail Katukov)
  - 2nd Guards Tank Army (Semyon Bogdanov)
  - 5th Shock Army (in Magnuszew bridgehead) (Nikolai Berzarin)
  - 8th Guards Army (in Magnuszew bridgehead) (General Vasily Chuikov)
  - 69th Army (in Puławy bridgehead) (Vladimir Kolpakchi)
  - 33rd Army (in Puławy bridgehead) (Vyacheslav Tsvetayev)
- 1st Ukrainian Front (Marshal Ivan Konev)
  - 21st Army (Dmitry Gusev)
  - 6th Army (Vladimir Gluzdovsky)
  - 3rd Guards Army (Vasily Gordov)
  - 13th Army (Nikolai Pukhov)
  - 4th Tank Army (Dmitry Lelyushenko)
  - 3rd Guards Tank Army (Pavel Rybalko)
  - 1st Guards Cavalry Corps (Viktor Kirillovich Baranov)
  - 52nd Army (Konstantin Koroteyev)
  - 5th Guards Army (Aleksey Semenovich Zhadov)
  - 59th Army (Ivan Korovnikov)
  - 60th Army (Pavel Kurochkin)

=== Wehrmacht ===
Soviet forces in this sector were opposed by Army Group A, defending a front which stretched from positions east of Warsaw southwards along the Vistula, almost to the confluence of the San. At that point there was a large Soviet bridgehead over the Vistula in the area of Baranów before the front continued south to Jasło.

There were three armies in the group; the 9th Army, deployed around Warsaw, the 4th Panzer Army, opposite the Baranow salient in the Vistula Bend, and the 17th Army to their south. The force had a total complement of 450,000 soldiers, 4,100 artillery pieces, and 1,150 tanks. Army Group A was led by Colonel-General Josef Harpe (who was replaced, after the offensive had begun, by Colonel-General Ferdinand Schörner on 20 January).

==== Order of battle ====
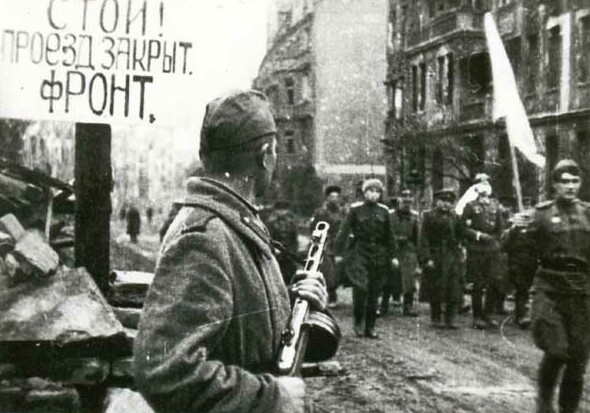
Delegation of German officers arriving to negotiate for the capitulation of Festung Breslau

- Army Group A (Colonel-General Josef Harpe to 20 January; then Ferdinand Schörner)
  - 9th Army (General Smilo Freiherr von Lüttwitz to 20 January; then General Theodor Busse)
    - LVI Panzer Corps (General Johannes Block)
    - XXXXVI Panzer Corps (General Walter Fries)
    - VIII Corps (General Walter Hartmann)
  - 4th Panzer Army (General Fritz-Hubert Gräser)
    - XLII Corps (General Hermann Recknagel)
    - XXIV Panzer Corps (General Walther Nehring)
    - XLVIII Panzer Corps (General Maximilian Reichsfreiherr von Edelsheim)
  - 17th Army (General Friedrich Schulz)
    - LIX Corps (General Edgar Rohricht)
    - XI Corps (General Rudolf von Bünau)
    - XI SS Panzer Corps (SS-Obergruppenfuhrer Matthias Kleinheisterkamp)

German intelligence had estimated that the Soviet forces had a 3:1 numerical superiority to the German forces; there was in fact a 5:1 superiority. More specifically, a report compiled by General Reinhard Gehlen of the Fremde Heer Ost (Foreign Armies East) estimated the Russians had an 11:1 superiority in infantry, 7:1 in tanks and 20:1 in artillery and aircraft for the start of the offensive. Hitler reportedly scoffed at the numbers and is quoted as saying of the numbers: "It is the greatest bluff since Genghis Khan". In the large Baranow/Sandomierz bridgehead, the Fourth Panzer Army was required to defend from "strongpoints" in some areas, as it lacked the infantry to man a continuous front line. In addition, on Hitler's express orders, the two German defence lines (the Grosskampflinie and Hauptkampflinie) were positioned very close to each other, placing the main defences well within striking range of Soviet artillery.

== Offensive ==
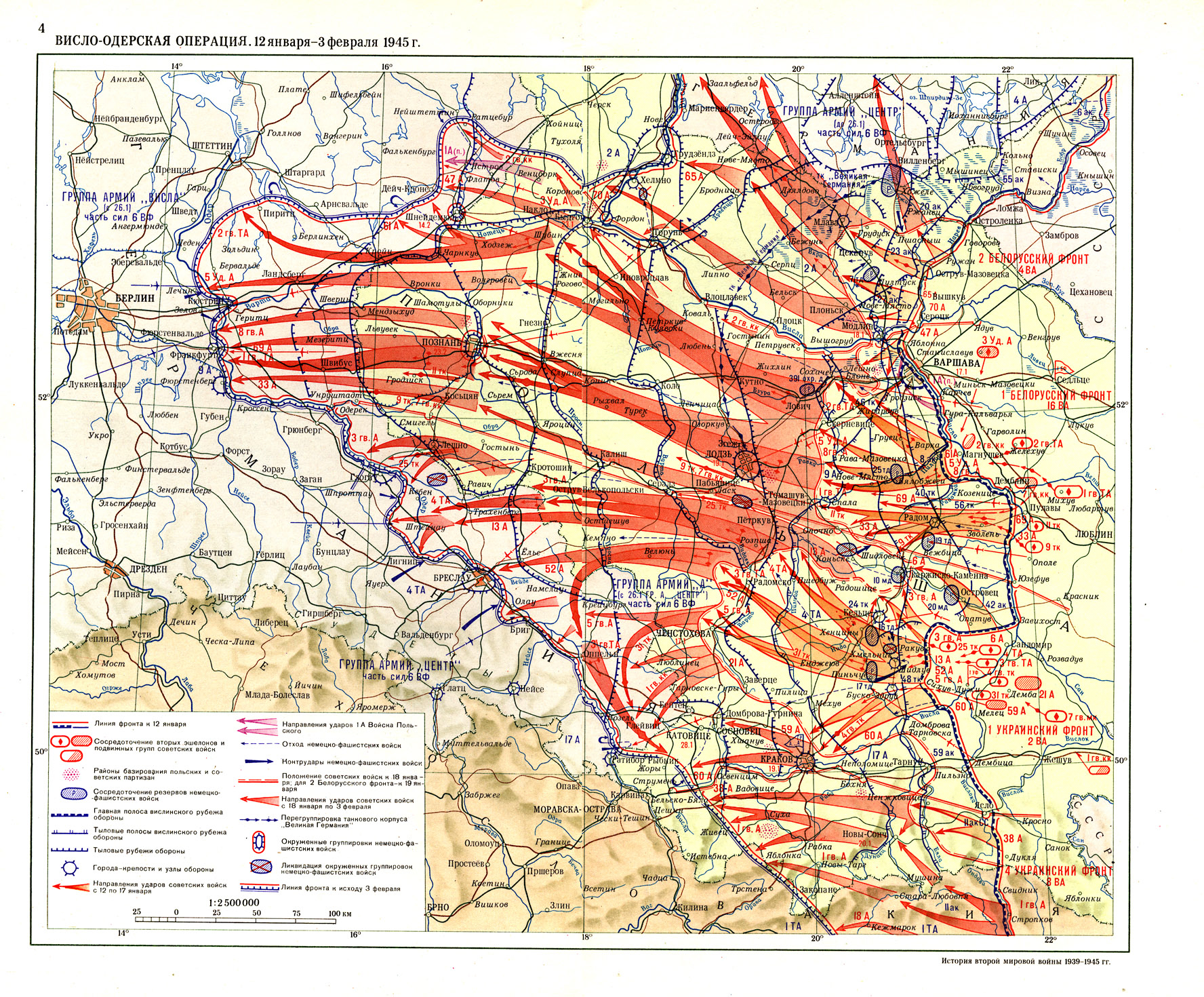
Vistula–Oder offensive

The offensive commenced in the Baranow bridgehead at 04:35 on 12 January with an intense bombardment by the guns of the 1st Ukrainian Front against the positions of the 4th Panzer Army. Concentrated against the divisions of XLVIII Panzer Corps, which had been deployed across the face of the bridgehead, the bombardment effectively destroyed their capacity to respond; a battalion commander in the 68th Infantry Division stated that "I began the operation with an understrength battalion [...] after the smoke of the Soviet preparation cleared [...] I had only a platoon of combat effective soldiers left".

The initial barrage was followed by probing attacks and a further heavy bombardment at 10:00. By the time the main armored exploitation force of the 3rd Guards and 4th Tank armies moved forward four hours later, the Fourth Panzer Army had already lost up to two-thirds of its artillery and one-fourth of its troops.

The Soviet units made rapid progress, moving to cut off the defenders at Kielce. The armored reserves of the 4th Panzer Army's central corps, the XXIV Panzer Corps, were committed but had suffered serious damage by the time they reached Kielce, and were already being outflanked. The XLVIII Panzer Corps, on the Fourth Panzer Army's southern flank, had by this time been completely destroyed, along with much of Recknagel's XLII Corps in the north. Recknagel himself would be killed by Polish partisans on 23 January. By 14 January, the 1st Ukrainian Front had forced crossings of the Nida river, and began to exploit towards Radomsko and the Warthe. The 4th Panzer Army's last cohesive formation, the XXIV Panzer Corps, held on around Kielce until the night of 16 January, before its commander made the decision to withdraw.

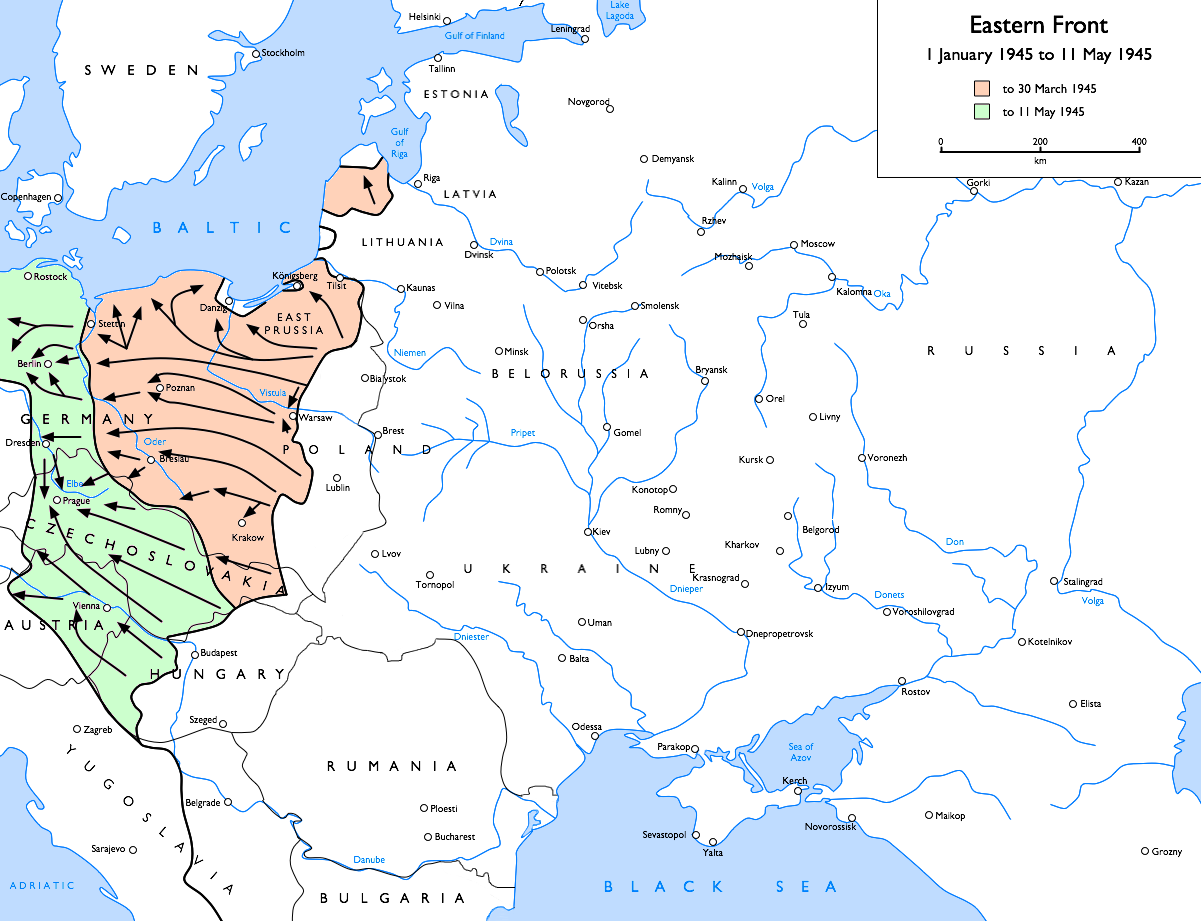
World War II Eastern Front during the 1945 Vistula–Oder offensive; the map also shows the East Prussian offensive, Lower Silesian offensive, the East Pomeranian offensive, and the battles in Courland.

The 1st Belorussian Front, to Konev's north, opened its attack on the German 9th Army from the Magnuszew and Puławy bridgeheads at 08:30, again commencing with a heavy bombardment. The 33rd and 69th armies broke out of the Puławy bridgehead to a depth of 30 km (19 mi), while the 5th Shock and 8th Guards armies broke out of the Magnuszew bridgehead. The 2nd and 1st guards tank armies were committed after them to exploit the breach. The 69th Army's progress from the Puławy bridgehead was especially successful, with the defending LVI Panzer Corps disintegrating after its line of retreat was cut off. Though the 9th Army conducted many local counter-attacks, they were all brushed aside; the 69th Army ruptured the last lines of defence and took Radom, while the 2nd Guards Tank Army moved on Sochaczew and the 1st Guards Tank Army was ordered to seize bridgeheads over the Pilica and attack towards Łódź. In the meantime, the 47th Army had crossed the Vistula and moved towards Warsaw from the north, while the 61st and 1st Polish armies encircled the city from the south.

The only major German response came on 15 January, when Hitler (against the advice of Guderian) ordered the Panzerkorps Großdeutschland of Dietrich von Saucken from East Prussia to cover the breach made in the sector of the 4th Panzer Army, but the advance of Zhukov's forces forced it to detrain at Łódź without even reaching its objective. After covering the 9th Army's retreat, it was forced to withdraw southwest toward the Warthe.

=== Taking of Kraków; escape of the XXIV Panzer Corps ===
On 17 January, Konev was given new objectives: to advance towards Breslau using his mechanised forces, and to use the combined-arms forces of the 60th and 59th armies to open an attack on the southern flank towards the industrial heartland of Upper Silesia through Kraków. Kraków was secured undamaged on 19 January after an encirclement by the 59th and 60th armies, in conjunction with the 4th Guards Tank Corps, forced the German defenders to withdraw hurriedly.

The second stage of the 1st Ukrainian Front's objective was far more complex, as they were required to encircle and secure the entire industrial region of Upper Silesia, where they were faced by Schulz's 17th Army. Konev ordered that the 59th and 60th armies advance frontally, while the 21st Army encircled the area from the north. He then ordered Rybalko's 3rd Guards Tank Army, moving on Breslau, to swing southwards along the upper Oder from 20 January, cutting off 17th Army's withdrawal.

In the meantime, the shattered remnants of the 4th Panzer Army were still attempting to reach German lines. By 18 January, Nehring and the XXIV Panzer Corps found that their intended route northwards had been blocked, so pulled back to the west, absorbing the remnants of XLII Corps that had escaped encirclement. Much of the remainder of XLII Corps was destroyed after being trapped around Przysucha. Screened by heavy fog, the lead elements of XXIV Panzer Corps reached the Warthe on 22 January, and having linked up with Grossdeutschland Panzer Corps of von Saucken, were finally able to cross the Oder, some 350 km (220 mi) from their positions at the start of the Soviet offensive.

=== Withdrawal of 17th Army from Upper Silesia ===
On 25 January, Schulz requested that he be allowed to withdraw his 100,000 troops from the developing salient around Katowice/Kattowitz. This was refused, and he repeated the request on 26 January. Schoerner eventually permitted Schulz to pull his forces back on the night of 27 January, while Konev – who had allowed just enough room for the 17th Army to withdraw without putting up serious resistance – secured the area undamaged.

On Konev's northern flank, the 4th Tank Army had spearheaded an advance to the Oder, where it secured a major bridgehead at Steinau. Troops of the 5th Guards Army established a second bridgehead upstream at Ohlau.

=== Advance of 1st Belorussian Front ===
In the northern sector of the offensive, Zhukov's 1st Belorussian Front also made rapid progress, as the 9th Army was no longer able to offer coherent resistance. Its XXXVI Panzer Corps, which was positioned behind Warsaw, was pushed over the Vistula into the neighbouring Second Army sector. Warsaw was taken on 17 January, as Army Group A's headquarters issued orders for the city to be abandoned; units of the 2nd Guards and 3rd Shock Armies entering the city were profoundly affected by the devastation wrought by German forces after the Warsaw Uprising. Hitler, on the other hand, was furious at the abandonment of the "fortress", arresting Colonel Bogislaw von Bonin, head of the Operations Branch of OKH, and sacking both the 9th Army and XXXVI Panzer Corps commanders; generals Smilo Freiherr von Lüttwitz and Walter Fries.

The 2nd Guards Tank Army pressed forward to the Oder, while to the south the 8th Guards Army reached Łódź by 18 January, and took it by 19 January. The 1st Guards Tank Army moved to encircle Poznań by 25 January, and the 8th Guards Army began to fight its way into the city on the following day, though there was protracted and intense fighting in the Siege of Poznań before the city would finally be taken.

To the northeast of Zhukov's 1st Belorussian Front, the lead elements of Marshal Rokossovsky's 2nd Belorussian Front taking part in the East Prussian offensive had reached the Baltic coast of the Vistula delta by 24 January and so succeeded in isolating Army Group Centre in East Prussia. On 27 January, the abandoned Wolf's Lair – Hitler's former headquarters on the Eastern Front, was captured.

=== Zhukov's advance to the Oder ===
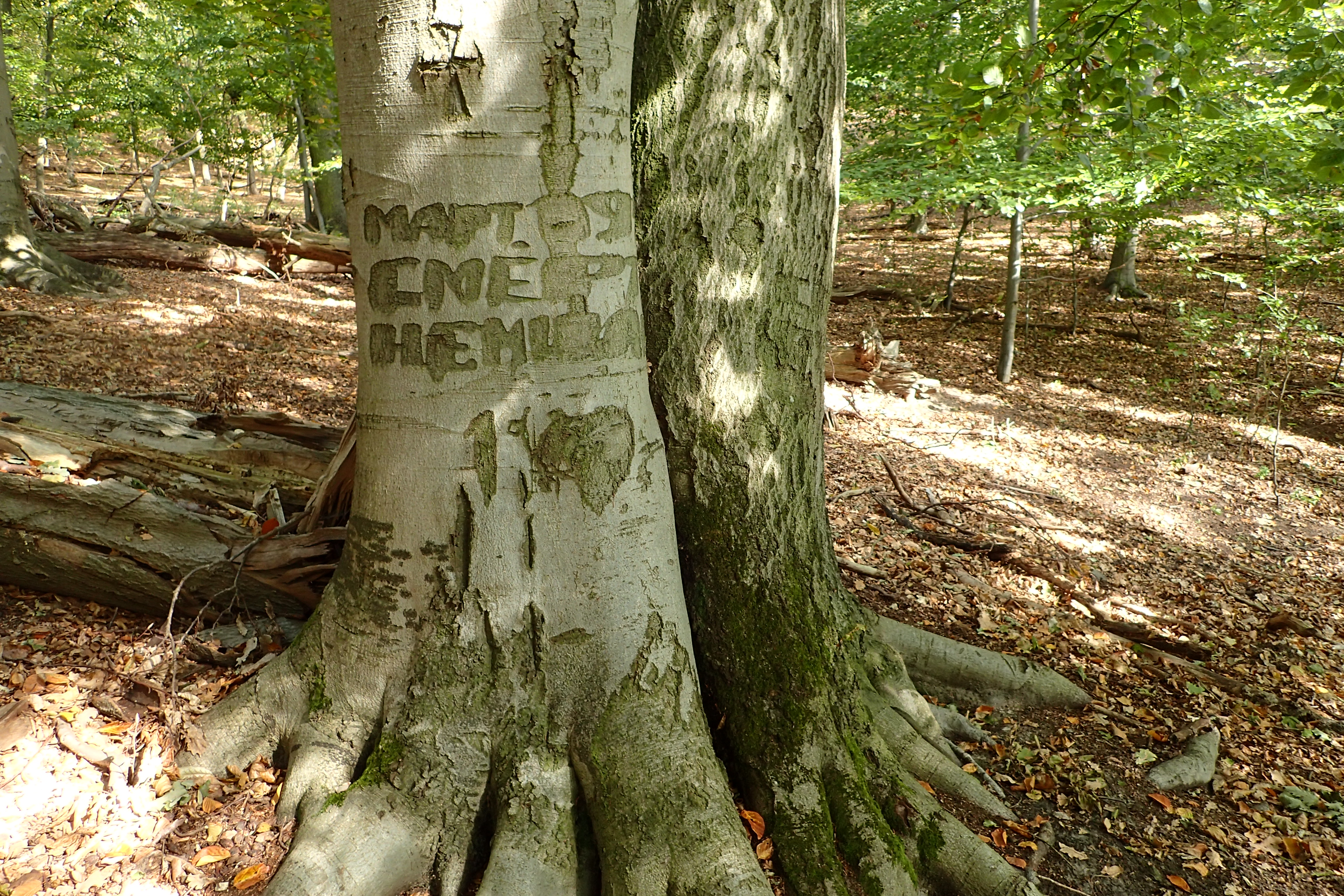
Tree carving in Bielinek (Bellinchen), Pomerania, immediately east of the Oder. It reads, in Russian, "March 1945, Death to the Germans."

After encircling Poznań, the 1st Guards Tank Army advanced deep into the fortified region around the Obra River against patchy resistance from a variety of Volkssturm and Wehrmacht units. There was heavier resistance, however, on the approaches to the fortress of Küstrin.

The German reorganisation of command structure that resulted in the creation of Army Group Vistula was accompanied by the release of a few extra formations for the defense; the V SS Mountain Corps, with two reserve infantry divisions, was deployed along the Obra and the prewar border fortifications known as the Tierschtigel Riegel, while the Panzergrenadier-Division Kurmark was ordered to reinforce it.

On 16 January 1945, Colonel Bogislaw von Bonin, the chief of the Operational Branch of the Army General Staff (Generalstab des Heeres) gave Army Group A permission to retreat from Warsaw, overruling a direct order from Hitler for them to hold fast. Three days later von Bonin was arrested by the Gestapo and imprisoned first at Flossenbürg and then Dachau concentration camp. The officer was eventually liberated along with other prisoners in South Tyrol by the US Army in May 1945.

The military historian Earl Ziemke described the advance thus:

On the 25th, Zhukov's main force passed Poznań heading due west towards Kuestrin, on the Oder forty miles [64 km] east of Berlin. The path of the Soviet advance looked like the work of a gigantic snowplough, its point aimed on a line from Warsaw to Poznań, to Berlin. All of Army Group A was being caught up by the point and the left blade and thrown across the Oder. On the right the German had nothing except a skeleton army group that Hitler had created some days earlier and named Army Group Vistula.

— Earl Ziemke

On 25 January, Hitler renamed three army groups. Army Group North became Army Group Courland; Army Group Centre became Army Group North and Army Group A became Army Group Centre.

The 2nd Guards Tank and 5th Shock armies reached the Oder almost unopposed; a unit of the 5th Shock Army crossed the river ice and took the town of Kienitz as early as 31 January.

Stavka declared the operation complete on 2 February. Zhukov had initially hoped to advance directly on Berlin, as the German defences had largely collapsed. However, the exposed northern flank of the 1st Belorussian Front in Pomerania, along with a German counter-attack (Operation Solstice) against its spearheads, convinced the Soviet command that it was essential to clear German forces from Pomerania in the East Pomeranian offensive before the Berlin offensive could proceed.

== Liberation of Nazi concentration camps ==
In July 1944, the Soviet 8th Guards liberated Lublin, and after a brief skirmish with German forces outside the city, came upon the Majdanek concentration camp. Although the Soviets invited press from around the world to witness the horrors of the camp, other war news overshadowed the event.

After being caught off guard at Majdanek, the Nazis realized that the Soviets would end up finding every camp within Eastern Europe (with all of the prisoners and guards still present) if something were not to be done. As a result, by mid-January, the SS and Nazi-controlled police units had begun forcing thousands of camp prisoners from Poland, East Prussia, Silesia and Pomerania to walk westward away from the advancing Red Army. The death marches, which took place over hundreds of kilometers in sub-zero conditions without food and medicine, resulted in thousands of concentration camp prisoners and Allied POWs dying en route. It is estimated that in March and April 1945, at least 250,000 men and women were marched on foot to the heartland of Germany and Austria, sometimes for weeks at a time.

On 27 January, troops from Konev's 1st Ukrainian Front (322nd Rifle Division, 60th Army) liberated the Auschwitz concentration camp. Despite attempts by retreating SS units to destroy parts of the camp, the Soviet forces still found graphic evidence of the Holocaust. The Soviets would also liberate camps such as Płaszów, Stutthof, and Ravensbrück.

== Flight of ethnic Germans ==
In anticipation of the approaching Red Army, the retreating Wehrmacht left parts of the German territory largely abandoned. With widespread unchecked chaos erupting, numerous reports of looting and attacks against ethnic Germans emerged. Nazi propaganda had furthermore demonized the Soviet Army so much that most Germans attempted to run. Millions of ethnic German refugees fled west, seeking relative safety in central or western Germany, or even in the custody of the Americans and British west of the Rhine.

== Outcome ==
The Vistula–Oder offensive was a major success for the Soviet military. Within a matter of days, the forces involved had advanced hundreds of kilometers, taking much of Poland and striking deep within the pre-war borders of the Reich. The offensive broke the back of Army Group A and much of Germany's remaining capacity for military resistance. However, the stubborn resistance of German forces in Silesia and Pomerania, as well as continuing fighting in East Prussia, meant that the final offensive towards Berlin was delayed by two months, by which time the Wehrmacht had once again built up a substantial force on this axis.

== Aftermath ==
On 31 January, the Soviet offensive was voluntarily halted, though Berlin was undefended and only approximately 70 km (43 mi) away from the Soviet bridgeheads across the Oder river. After the war, a debate raged, mainly between Vasily Chuikov and Georgy Zhukov, whether it was wise to stop the offensive. Chuikov argued Berlin should have been taken then, while Zhukov defended the decision to stop.

The operation was followed by a period of several weeks of mopping-up and consolidation on the part of the Red Army, along with ongoing hard fighting in pockets in the north. On 16 April, the Red Army jumped off from lines on the Oder and Neisse Rivers, the opening phase of the Battle of Berlin, which proved to be the culminating offensive of the war on the Eastern Front. The relatively rapid progress of this new offensive toward the German heartland seems to illustrate the cumulative extent of the erosion of the Wehrmacht's capability to defend a broad front. Nevertheless, they remained dangerous opponents for some weeks longer, especially when allowed or forced to concentrate in limited areas.

== See also ==
- Battle of Berlin
- Operation Solstice, German counter-offensive in Pomerania
- Silesian offensives, operations to clear the southern flank of 1st Ukrainian Front
- Western Carpathian offensive, the parallel offensive in Slovakia
