= 4th Guards Cavalry Corps =

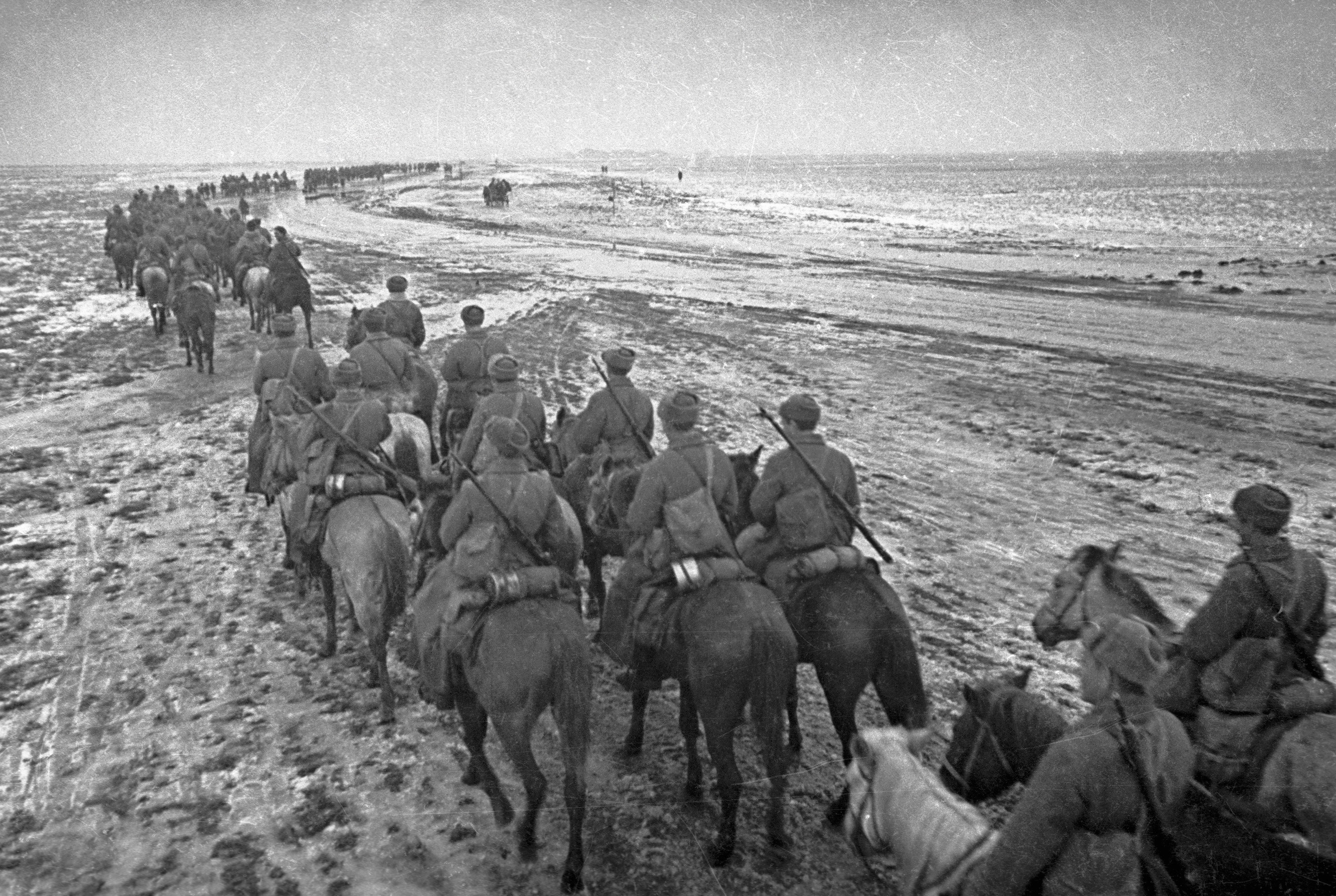
- Active: August 1942 - April 1955
- Country: Soviet Union
- Branch: Cavalry
- Engagements: Great Patriotic War: Operation Bagration; Operation Debrecen; Vienna Offensive; Battle of Prague

Commanders
- Notable commanders: Issa Pliev

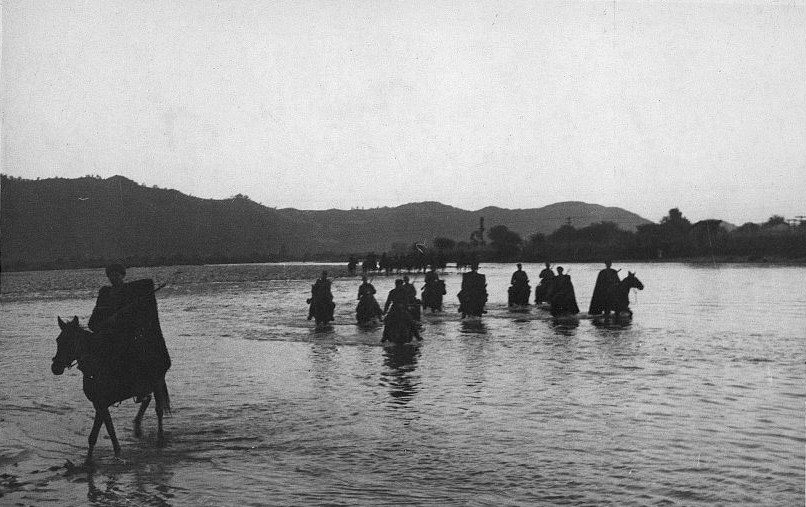
Cavalrymen of the corps fording a river in the Caucasus, September 1942

4th Guards Order of Kutuzov Cavalry Corps was a cavalry formation of the Soviet Red Army which served most notably as part of the Cavalry mechanized group under the command of Guards Lieutenant General Issa Pliyev in operational engagements from Operation Bagration until the Battle of Prague when World War II finally came to an end.

== Commanders ==
- Lieutenant General Nikolai Kirichenko (27.08.1942 - 03.11.1943)
- Lieutenant General Issa Pliyev (04.11.1943 - 05.11.1944)
- Major General Vasily Golovskoy (05.11.1944 - 08.04.1945)
- Lieutenant General Fyodor Kamkov (12.04.1945 - end of war)
