= 3rd Cavalry Corps (Soviet Union) =

3rd Cavalry Corps 2nd Guards Cavalry Corps
- Active: 1925 – 1940; November 1941 – December 1945
- Allegiance: Soviet Union
- Branch: Soviet Red Army
- Engagements: Soviet invasion of Poland; Great Patriotic War

The 3rd Cavalry Corps was a corps of the Soviet Red Army.

== History ==
As part of the 11th Army, it took part in the Soviet invasion of Poland in 1939.

The Corps was recreated on November 20, 1941, on the basis of the Dovator Cavalry Group.
For its excellent performance behind the German lines, by order of the NPO No. 342 of November 26, 1941, the 3rd Cavalry Corps was transformed into the 2nd Guards Cavalry Corps, which fought during the rest of the war.

== Organization (1939) ==
- 7th Cavalry Division
- 36th Cavalry Division (Soviet Union)
- 6th Tank Brigade

== Commanders ==
- Commander Semyon Konstantinovich Timoshenko (02.1925 - 17.08.1933),
- Commander Leonid Veyner (17.08.1933 - 05.1935),
- Komdiv Danilo Srdić (17.07.1935 - fired 29.06.1937, arrested 15.07.1937, executed 26.07.1937),
- Komdiv Georgy Zhukov (07.1937 - 02.1938),
- Komdiv Yakov Cherevichenko (03.1938 - 06.1940).

=== 2nd formation ===
- General-Major Lev Dovator (20.11.1941 - 19.12.1941), KIA
- General-Major Issa Pliyev (19.12.1941 - 05.03.1942);
- General-Major, General-Lieutenant Vladimir Kryukov (06.03.1942 - December 1945).
