= Pavel Belov =

Soviet military commander (1897–1963)

Pavel Alexeyevich Belov
- Born: 18 February 1897; Shuya, Vladimir Governorate, Russian Empire
- Died: 3 December 1963 (aged 66); Moscow, Soviet Union
- Military career
- Allegiance: Russian Empire (1916–1917); Russian Republic (1917); Soviet Russia (1918–1922); Soviet Union (1922–1960)
- Branch: Russian Imperial Army; Red Army (Soviet Army from 1946)
- Service years: 1916–1960
- Rank: Colonel General
- Commands: 2nd Cavalry Corps (became 1st Guards Cavalry Corps); 61st Army; Don Military District; North Caucasus Military District; South Ural Military District
- Conflicts: World War I; Russian Civil War; World War II
- Awards: Hero of the Soviet Union; Order of Lenin (4); Order of the Red Banner (3); Order of Suvorov, 1st class (3); Order of Kutuzov, 1st class

Pavel Alexeyevich Belov (Russian: Павел Алексеевич Белов; 18 February 1897 – 3 December 1963) was a Soviet Army colonel general and a Hero of the Soviet Union. He was nicknamed the "Fox" by the Germans and personally led the longest successful war raid, lasting five months behind the German lines. He has earned legendary status and could be considered one of the greatest cavalry generals. Considering his accomplishments from 1941 to 1945, his adaptation of combining horses, tanks, artillery, and aircraft on a modern battlefield resulted in the victory against a more technologically advanced enemy, often in the most desperate parts of the Eastern Front.

At the beginning of the war, Belov commanded the 2nd Cavalry Corps. During the Battle of Moscow on 26 November, it was renamed and given the honor of becoming the 1st Guards Cavalry Corps, the divisions also received 'Guards' designations. The newly established cavalry corps was pivotal in stopping Guderian's Panzers in 1941 on the southern outposts of Moscow near the town of Kashira. His unit was the first to start the counterattack in the Battle of Moscow. Following the winter counterattack, they penetrated deep into the enemy rear, getting cut off from the rest of the army. During the Battle of Rzhev, Belov would lead a successful five-month raid with the 1st Guards Cavalry Corps behind Army Group Center.

After returning from the raid in the summer of 1942, he was promoted and given command of the 61st Army, which he led for the rest of the war. Finishing the war in the Battle of Berlin on the Elbe River; his successor of the Corps became Viktor Kirillovich Baranov. Belov's command of the Army included the Battle of Kursk in 1943. Later he took part in Operation Bagration, where his units helped to liberate the Fortress of Brest. Later the units participated in the Riga Offensive in the Courland Pocket, followed by the defeat of the German Pomeranian offensive in early 1945. The 61st Army, alongside the 1st Polish Army, was responsible for encircling the German capital from the north, meeting the Americans on the Elbe in the Battle of Berlin. Overall, he is considered one of the most talented and daring generals of the Second World War. General Belov is mentioned more than any Allied General in the memoir of Franz Halder, the chief of staff of the Army High Command (OKH) in Nazi Germany.

Belov was one of the few generals not affected by Stalin's military purges despite having a Polish wife. From the first days, he demonstrated effective tactics against the onslaught of the Blitzkrieg, along with Lev Dovator earning the first tactical victories for the Red Army. Due to the constant retreats of 1941, the unit played rear-guard duties, especially during the Uman disaster. The unit additionally played a rescue role for the many trapped troops in the Battle of Kiev, which Belov's forces unsuccessfully tried to save. Stalin called his unit the "Fire Squad," as they were often thrown into the most challenging positions, expecting to save the situation.

Pavel Belov was greatly respected among his peers as a general who truly cared about his soldiers. He often refused to send his units into pointless attacks that his superiors often demanded. This could explain why he was only awarded the Gold Star in 1944, considering his admiration by the foe along with his accomplishments on the battlefield.

== Early life, World War I, and Russian Civil War ==
Born in Shuya on 18 February 1897 to a working-class family, Pavel Alexeyevich Belov worked at the railway station in Ivanovo-Voznesensk. Conscripted into the Imperial Russian Army in May 1916, Belov became a private in the 4th Reserve Cavalry Regiment. After graduating from the regimental training detachment in February 1917, he was sent to serve as a junior unter-ofitser with the 7th Marching Squadron of the 17th Hussar Regiment. Due to his above-average education, Belov was selected for a preparatory course at the 2nd Kiev School of Praporshchiks in September. Granted leave in late November following the October Revolution, Belov did not return to the army.

Conscripted into the Red Army in July 1918 during the Russian Civil War, Belov was appointed a Vsevobuch instructor in the Yaroslavl Military District, where he provided military training for railway workers. He commanded a platoon of the Separate Cavalry Battalion in Tambov from July 1919, and in February 1920 transferred to command a platoon of the 1st Reserve Cavalry Regiment of the Southern Front. Belov became secretary of the party bureau and regimental adjutant in May, and in October he was transferred to the Caucasian Front, serving there as a squadron commander of the 1st and 2nd Reserve Cavalry Regiments.

== Interwar period ==
After the end of the war, Belov was appointed assistant commander of the 1st Reserve Cavalry Regiment of the 2nd Don Rifle Division in June 1921. In September of that year, he was transferred to the 14th Cavalry Division to serve as assistant commander of its 82nd Cavalry Regiment, and was later appointed commander of the 81st Cavalry Regiment. After graduating from the Cavalry Improvement Course for Senior Commanders of the North Caucasus Military District in August 1927, Belov was appointed commander of the 60th Separate Reserve Squadron of the 10th Cavalry Division (renumbered from the 14th), now stationed in the Moscow Military District. After serving as assistant chief of the 4th department of the staff of the district from May 1929, in June 1931 Belov became an officer for special assignments under Semyon Budyonny, who was then a member of the Revolutionary Military Council. In September 1932 he was appointed assistant inspector of cavalry with the Cavalry Inspectorate, before graduating from the Frunze Military Academy in 1933.

Belov was sent to the 7th Samara Cavalry Division, stationed in the Belorussian Military District, in January 1934, serving as assistant commander and later succeeding to the command of the division. Having received the rank of kombrig when the Red Army introduced personal military ranks in November 1935, he became chief of staff of the 5th Cavalry Corps in July 1937, and participated in the Soviet invasion of Poland in September 1939. Promoted to komdiv, Belov became a major general in June 1940 when the army introduced general officer ranks, and in October of that year was appointed commander of the 96th Mountain Rifle Division of the Kiev Special Military District. In March 1941 he advanced to command the 2nd Cavalry Corps of the district.

== World War II ==
=== Operation Barbarossa ===
After Operation Barbarossa began, Belov led the corps in fighting on the Southern Front, completing a number of combat missions to quickly cover the front of the 9th and 18th armies of the Southern Front and hold the line on the Dniester. He conducted a fighting retreat from Tiraspol to Kiev. During the Kiev operation, which ended in the defeat of Soviet troops in Ukraine, he waged successful defensive battles in the direction of Romny-Shtepovka, and even launched a strong counterattack in this area, which made it possible to save part of the encircled troops. During the summer-autumn battles of 1941, he was awarded the Order of Lenin.

During the October 1941 German offensive towards Moscow, Army Group Center was stuck in the rasputitsa. These muddy periods are of particular interest because they enhanced the operations of the Belov's cavalry as it defeated the bogged down German 25th Motorized Division in September 1941. The mud-caused quagmire was also a factor in the Soviet Army's failure to support Belov's 1st Guards Cavalry Corps' return to friendly lines after its five-month raid behind enemy German lines in April 1942.

=== Battle of Moscow and Rzhev ===
In September 1941, Belov's 2nd Cavalry Corps had been transferred to the Western Front to defend the approaches to Moscow. By late October, after fighting on the flanks of the German assault at Orel and Tula, the 2nd Cavalry Corps was withdrawn from the line and sent into Stavka Reserve to be rebuilt. On 26 November, it was renamed the 1st Guards Cavalry Corps. The corps' divisions also received 'Guards' designations.

The new honorific title did not come with new weapons. On the eve of the Moscow counter-offensive, Belov made a personal appeal, with Marshal Zhukov's support, directly to Stalin for the rearmament of his corps. Belov's men were armed primarily with rifles, giving the German infantry a clear advantage. After Belov's meeting with Stalin, he was promised 1,500 automatic weapons and two new batteries of new 76mm guns to replace his worn-out guns.

He played a crucial role in stopping Operation Typhoon, the German code-name for the assault on Moscow, particularly in stopping Heinz Guderian's Panzers outside of Kashira on the southern flank of Moscow, thus saving both Moscow and besieged Tula. Guderian's penetration had culminated by forming a salient northeast of Tula, threatening the towns of Kashira and Riazan. The 2nd Panzer Army was poised to enter Moscow from the south and south-west. Guderian had attempted to seize Tula from the rear and was strung out without reserves. The corps, along with the 50th Army and 10th Army, were to hold out at all costs. At the same time, the mobile group Belov with cavalry, tanks, katyusha rockets, airborne units, and additional rifle troops began the offensive. By 5 December, Guderian's armored assault had halted against the stubborn defenses of Belov's 1st Guards Cavalry Corps outside of Kashira. The first stroke of the Western Front's counter-offensive on the outskirts of Moscow fell on Guderian's 2nd Panzer Army. The Germans in this sector had an advantage in men, equipment, and tanks, where the average front line saw a 3-1 disparity of tanks in Guderian's favor.

The cavalry corps heroically held its position after many German counter-attacks. They became the first Allied units to begin the first counter-attack on the night of 27–28 November, thus leading the Soviet forces as the vanguard. On the eve of 5 December, the 1st Guards Cavalry Corps, reinforced with the 9th Tank Brigade, the most elite and capable tank unit, led the attack along with the 173rd Rifle Division in the vicinity of Gritchino. On the Corps' western flank was the 50th Army successfully defending Tula. The 50th Army attacked along with the 10th Army, which covered Belov's eastern flank. The forces smashed against the German 17th Panzer Division, 17th Motorized Division, and the 18th Panzer Division, which saw many towns and villages liberated. Many Soviet soldiers saw the horrors behind the rear; this motivated many to fight harder.

The Guards then liberated the important industrial city of Stalinogorsk after coming to the help of the 330th Rifle Division of the 10th Army, which unsuccessfully was trying to take the city. The cavalry used outflanking maneuvers to take both parts I and II of the industrial city in four days of intense fighting. Some local citizens also actively participated in the battle.

While the Corps was pushing further toward the southwest, the German 17th Panzer Division, 167th Division, and parts of the 29th Motorized Division blew up a dam, hoping to stop or slow Belov. However, due to the cold, the water quickly froze, and Belov's forces continued to pursue. Eventually, with the success of the 10th and 50th Armies, the 1st Guards Cavalry Corps was able to drive the Germans the furthest from Moscow, as far as 250 km. This event caused Hitler to sack Heinz Guderian on 25 December 1941. In the documentary "Moscow Strikes Back", Pavel Belov and the 1st Guards Cavalry Corps are given significant attention for their heroic actions. This footage demonstrated to the world that the proper and skillful use of cavalry could destroy even the best German armored units. The documentary became an instant hit showing the realities of war, winning the Stalin Prize and internationally winning the 15th Academy Awards for Best Documentary in 1942.

The winter of 1941-1942 was extremely severe. Mean temperatures near Moscow during January 1942 were -32 °F or -35 °C with the lowest temperature recorded on 26 January 1941 -63 °F/-52 °C. In the counterattack and the general offensive of Soviet troops in the western direction, the 1st Guards Cavalry Corps under the command of Belov distinguished itself more than once in battles: after the Rzhev-Vyazma operation (1942), being surrounded, Belov fought in the enemy's rear for more than five months. Belov's 1st Guards Cavalry Corps, along with the 33rd Army, controlled a pocket from south of Smolensk-Vyazma in size of 2 500 km^{2} (1 553 mile²) area. In his pocket, Belov mustered 2,000 men from the cavalry, partisans, paratroopers, and riflemen, supported by a battalion of eight tanks including one KV heavy and one T-34 medium tank.

One sign of Belov's merits at the initial stage of the war may be the fact that the chief of the General Staff of the Wehrmacht, Franz Halder, repeatedly mentions the general in his diaries (much more often than any of the Soviet commanders), giving his actions a positive characterization. On June 16, General Halder wrote in his operations diary:

"Cav Corps Belov has again broken out and is moving in the direction of Kirov. Nothing we could brag about. Cav Corps Belov is now floating around the area west of Kirov. Quite a man, that we have to send no less than seven divisions after him."

Halder also wrote "Belov did it, after all, keeping seven German divisions on the jump."

The former Chief of staff of the Fourth Army wrote an appropriate tribute to Belov's accomplishments.

"The episode caused many humorous remarks at the time and the motorized troops which had taken part in the operations became the butt of those jokes. I admire General Belov as a soldier and I was secretly glad he escaped. It was said he was received with all honors in Moscow and rightly so."

The 1st Guards Cavalry Corps escaped the pocket, although the 11th Cavalry Corps did not. The conclusion of Operations Hannover I and II allowed Army Group Centre to focus its efforts on liquidating the 11th Cavalry Corps and 39th Army.

The January to February 1942 raids initially almost succeeded in isolating and destroying the fourth army and crippling Army group centre. The blame for ultimately failing to achieve this objective is STAVKA's for selecting an operational objective not suited to the forces employed. The original primary goal was to cut the Smolensk railroad and not to capture Vyazma. The 1st Guards Cavalry Corps and 11th Cavalry Corps were lightly armoured, and winter conditions prevented the limited artillery from keeping pace with the riflemen and horsemen. As penetration developed, 1st Guards Cavalry Corps' mission was changed to capturing Vyazma; however, the lightly armed cavalry and paratroopers never had sufficient combat power to capture this important supply centre.

Belov recognized this reality early on when his men emerged from the forest and their first probing attacks against the hastily erected German defenses were repulsed. His request to bypass these defenses to the west and in conjunction with the 11th cavalry Corps to cut the railroad feeding the city was denied by Marshal Zhukov. At this point in the battle, the Raiders had the capacity to reach the road and cut the 4th Army's main supply in line. However, due to the lack of coordination between the Western Front's attack and Belov, the Germans managed to create an operational reserve from the infantry and Panzer forces. This established a defensive line to protect the Fourth Army's key lines of communication. While the raid was not an unqualified success, it did disrupt the German war plan at the operational level between February and July 1942.

The main weakness of the cavalry force operating behind German lines was its lack of fire support. Horse Artillery was often unable to keep pace with the cavalry due to extreme winter weather conditions. The absence of tanks and anti-tank artillery often left troops to engage German armored vehicles with nothing more than anti-tank rifles, rifle grenades, and Molotov cocktails. The cavalry received only limited support after the initial breakthrough. German air superiority even in bad weather forced the cavalry to conduct their movements at night. Limited supplies were flown into the area at night, but the reader is primarily left of the land independent and Partizan support for supplies and medical aid. Soviet air support did, however, evacuate 3000 wounded, and ultimately Belov escaped via air.

=== From Kursk to Berlin ===
From June 1942 until the end of the war, Belov commanded the 61st Army. The army fought defensive and offensive battles south and south-west of Bely until mid-1943. As part of the Bryansk Front, they participated in the Oryol Operation in July and August 1943. Commanding the 61st Army, Belov especially proved himself in the battle for the Dnieper: from September 26 to October 1, 1943, formations and units of the army crossed the Dnieper near the village of Lubech and captured the bridgehead on the right bank. For the successful crossing of the Dnieper, Belov was awarded the title of Hero of the Soviet Union. Subsequently, the army took part in the Gomel-Rechitsa, Kalinkovichi-Mozyr, Belorussian, Riga offensive operations, the blocking of the Courland group, in the Warsaw-Poznan, East Pomeranian and Berlin offensive operations.

== Postwar ==
After World War II, he commanded the South Ural Military District for ten years. He then chaired the Voluntary Association for Support of the Army, Air Force, and Navy (DOSAAF). Belov retired from the military in 1960 and died on 3 December three years later. He was buried with military honors at the Novodevichy Cemetery.

== Awards and honors ==
USSR

Hero of the Soviet Union (15 January 1944)
Five Orders of Lenin (11 June 1941, 2 January 1942, 15 January 1944, 21 February 1945, 28 February 1957)
Order of the Red Banner, thrice (11 December 1941, 13 March 1944, 20 June 1949)
Order of Suvorov, 1st class, thrice (23 August 1944, 6 April 1945, 29 May 1945)
Order of Kutuzov, 1st class (27 August 1943)
Medal "To a Partisan of the Patriotic War", 1st class (7 September 1943)
Medal "For the Defence of Moscow" (1944)
Medal "For the Capture of Berlin" (1945)
Medal "For the Liberation of Warsaw" (1945)
Medal "For the Victory over Germany in the Great Patriotic War 1941–1945" (1945)
Jubilee Medal "XX Years of the Workers' and Peasants' Red Army" (1938)
Jubilee Medal "30 Years of the Soviet Army and Navy" (1948)
Jubilee Medal "40 Years of the Armed Forces of the USSR" (1958)

Foreign Awards

Order of Sukhbaatar (Mongolia)
Knight's Cross of the Virtuti Militari (Poland)
Cross of Grunwald, 3rd class (Poland)
Medal "For Warsaw 1939-1945" (Poland)
Medal "For Oder, Neisse and the Baltic" (Poland)

== See also ==
- Georgy Zhukov
- Vasily Chuikov
- Ivan Konev
- Konstantin Rokossovsky
- Lev Dovator
- Issa Pliyev
- Viktor Kirillovich Baranov

== Sources ==
=== Printed ===
- Buttar, Prit (2012). Battleground Prussia: The Assault on Germany's Eastern Front 1944-45. Osprey Publishing. ISBN 978-1849087902.
- Harrel, John (2019). Soviet Cavalry Operations During The Second World War: The Genesis Of The Operational Manoeuvre Group. Pen & Sword Military. ISBN 978-1849087902.

=== Online ===
- Tucker, Spencer (2011). "Belov, Pavel Alekseyevich (1897 - 1962)". ABC-CLIO.
