= Lev Dovator =

Soviet military commander

- Леў Міхайлавіч Даватар; Лев Михайлович Доватор
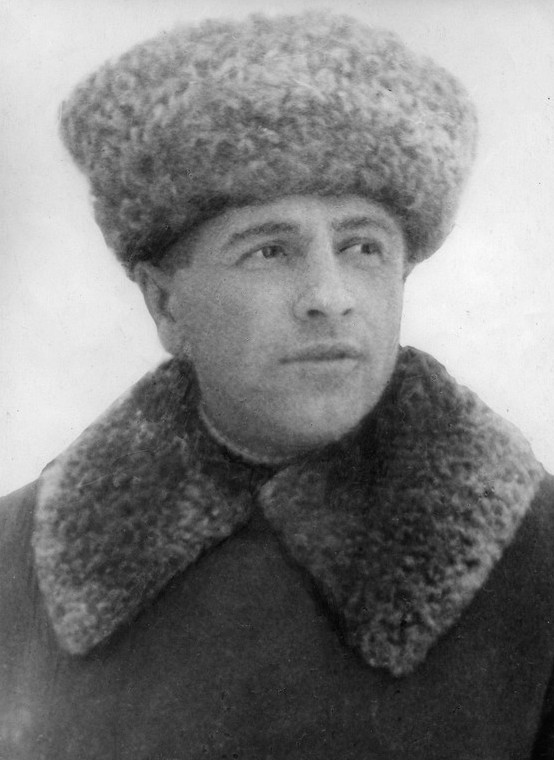
- Born: 20 February [O.S. 7 February] 1903; Khotino, Vitebsk Governorate, Russian Empire
- Died: 19 December 1941 (aged 38) near Palashkino, Moscow Oblast, Ruzsky District, Moscow Oblast, Soviet Union
- Burial place: Novodevichy Cemetery
- Military career
- Allegiance: Soviet Union
- Branch: Red Army
- Service years: 1924–1941
- Rank: Major general
- Commands: 3rd Cavalry Corps; 2nd Guards Cavalry Corps
- Conflicts: World War II; Operation Barbarossa; Battle of Moscow †
- Awards: Hero of the Soviet Union

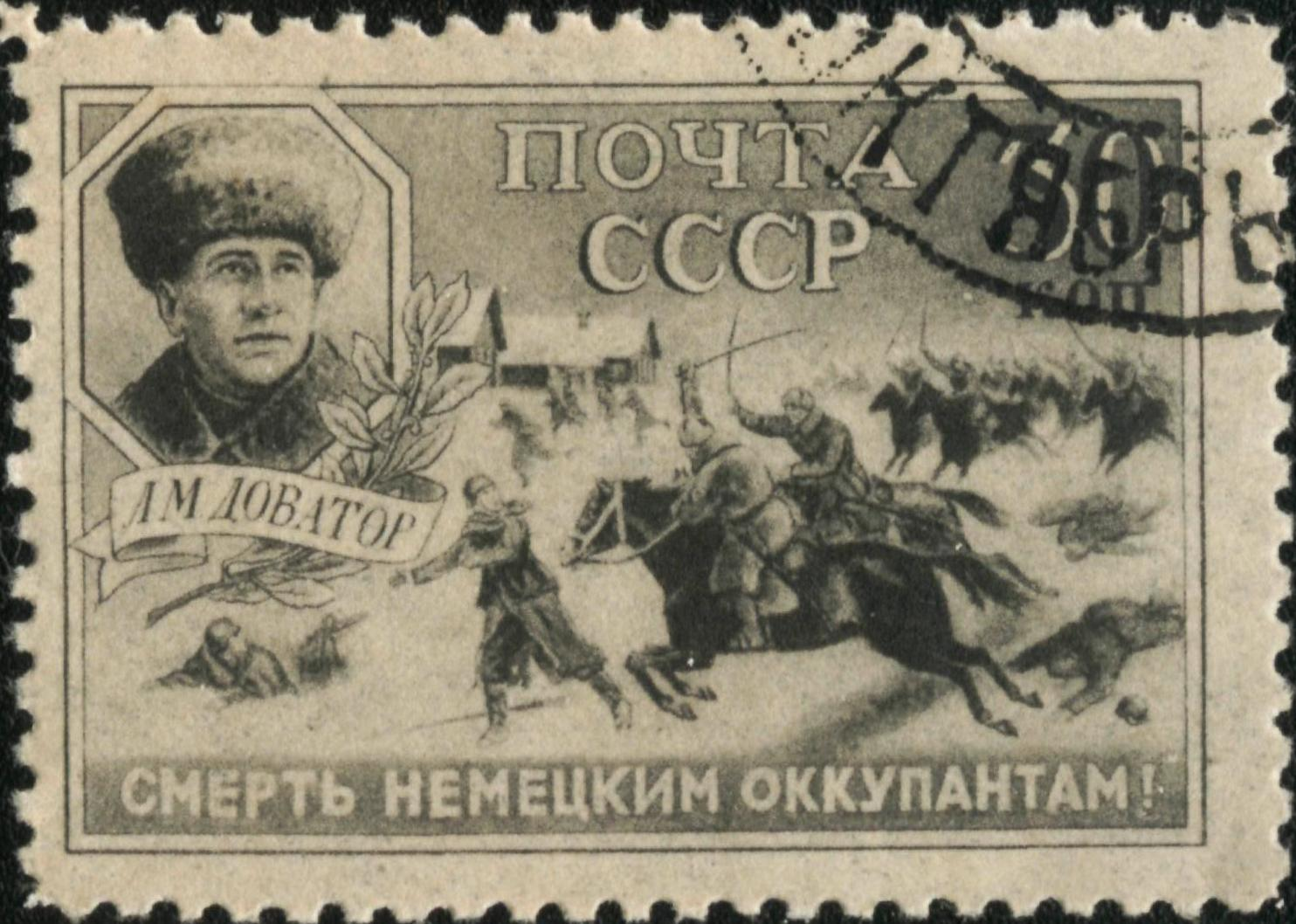
Lev Dovator (upper left) on the Soviet stamp published during the war. The text says "Death to German occupiers!"

Lev Mikhaylovich Dovator (20 February [O.S. 7 February] 1903 – 19 December 1941) was a famous Soviet major general who was killed in action during World War II and posthumously awarded the title of Hero of the Soviet Union.

== Life ==
Born in 1903, Dovator came from a Belarusian Jewish peasant family. In 1922, he was elected to be Secretary of the Komsomol Committee of Khotino village. He joined the Red Army in 1924 and went on to become an officer after graduating from cavalry school and a military academy. In 1926, he attended Borisoglebsk-Leningrad Cavalry Commanders School, graduating in 1929 to become a platoon commander in the 27th Cavalry Regiment, 5th Cavalry Division. In October 1933, he was posted with the 1st Cavalry Regiment, 1st Cavalry Division, as a commissar. From May 1935 to May 1936, Colonel Dovator was commissar of the Independent Reconnaissance Battalion of the 93rd Rifle Division. He attended Frunze Military Academy in 1939, and during the early months of the war, Dovator was with the Western Front Headquarters. At the outbreak of the Second World War, he was a colonel in charge of a brigade of Cossack cavalry.

== Operation Barbarossa ==
At the start of the German invasion of the Soviet Union, he was posted as Chief of Staff of the Red Army's 36th Cavalry Division. In July 1941, he won the Order of the Red Banner for bravery in the defensive battles at the Solovyo crossing of the Dniepr. Colonel Dovator conducted a successful fighting withdrawal, crossing a bridge over the river just before the Germans captured it. In August 1941, he was given command of a cavalry group consisting of the 50th and 53rd Cavalry Divisions. General Lev Dovator's 50th and 53rd Cavalry Divisions were raised exclusively from Kuban Cossacks. Despite his Jewish heritage, unique with the Cossacks, they accepted Dovator as one of their own and considered him a great leader, superb horseman, and master of sabre.

By mid-August, German troops reached the Mezha River. On August 13, Dovator received orders to raid the German rear and disrupt preparations for their next advance. Out of his two divisions of 4,500 men, he took 3,000 Cossacks. The group was concentrated in the vicinity of Pozhano, Formino, and Budnits. By mid-August, they were assembled in a swampy and forested region 20 km (12 miles) east of Zharkovskii, well behind and beyond the 30th Army's right flank. For a week, Dovator's Cossacks repeatedly probed the German defenses, seeking to infiltrate. The cavalry pressed its advance into the German rear in a dispersed formation, traveling along cart roads and forest trails. Thanks to excellent reconnaissance, his cavalry, for 10 days smashed the German rear. During this time, they killed more than 2,500 troops of the Wehrmacht, 200 vehicles, and 7 tanks. The famous artists of the Moscow circus from the team of Mikhail Tuganov notably served in this unit. They were reportedly able to shoot standing on the back of a galloping horse or, conversely, by firing from underneath its belly, which influenced the development among Germans of the myth of the "wild Russian".

The formation created an illusion that their riding force was much larger than 3,000 sabres, which had a great psychological effect on the Germans. Squadrons unexpectedly materialized from dense forests to cut communication wires, attack supply convoys, and isolate German garrisons, only to vanish back into the forests. Once liberated, villagers reported that they had heard from the Germans that 100,000 Cossacks had broken through German lines. Dovator's deception was clearly effective. He soon became the commander of a cavalry group, and in August–September 1941 this cavalry group executed the most daring raid through rear areas of the German army in the vicinity of Smolensk. Dovator's famous raid in early 1941 was conducted with only 3,000 sabres and sixty-five machine guns carried on packhorses. The Germans, after the raid, appointed an award amounting to 100,000 Marks for his head. On 11 September 1941, he was promoted to major general for this action.

== Battle of Moscow ==
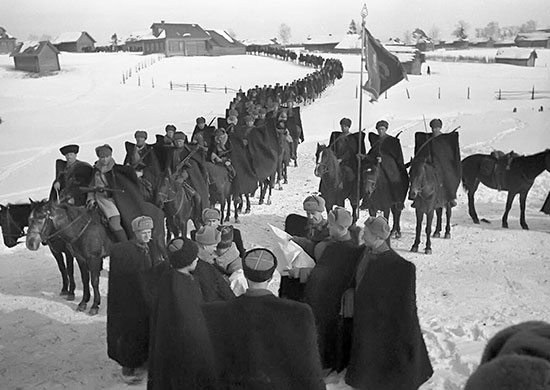
Guards Major General L.M. Dovator with his cavalrymen

On 20 November, his unit became the 3rd Cavalry Corps due to its enormous battlefield success. On 27 November, however, it was renamed the 2nd Guards Cavalry Corps. During the Battle of Moscow, Dovator was the commander of 2nd Guards Cavalry Corps, which fended off the enemy advance at Volokolamsk.

He was killed in an offensive action on 19 December 1941, near the outskirts of Ruza. He was reportedly cut down by machine-gun fire while crawling towards a forward position to get a better look near the village of Palashkino.

Dovator was posthumously awarded the title Hero of the Soviet Union, two days afterwards, as well as the Order of Lenin. He was replaced in command by Major General Issa Pliyev. Lev Dovator was buried alongside Ivan Panfilov, as they fought together to stop the 9th Army (Wehrmacht) from reaching Moscow.

== See also ==
- Georgy Zhukov
- Vasily Chuikov
- Ivan Konev
- Konstantin Rokossovsky
- Pavel Belov
- Issa Pliyev
