= Cavalry mechanized group =

Soviet combined horse and tank corps

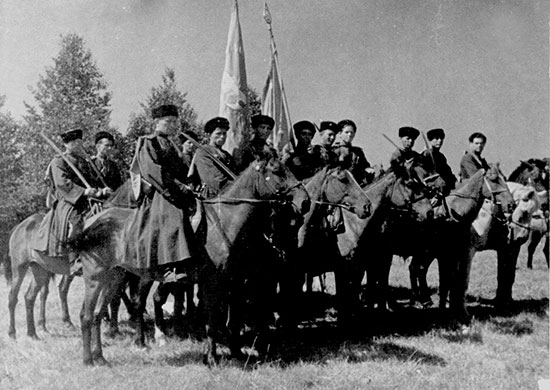
Cossack Cavalry Kuban-Slutsk Red Banner Orders of Suvorov, Kutuzov and Bogdan Khmelnitsky Division. 1944.

A cavalry-mechanized group (Russian:Конно-механизированная группа (КМГ)) was a type of military formation used in the Red Army during World War II against Germany and Japan. It involved a combination of armor and horses.

== Organization ==
A cavalry-mechanized group normally consisted of a cavalry corps (a unit smaller than a standard infantry division despite its name) and a mechanized corps, and was slightly stronger than a German Panzergrenadier division. The main force element providing combat power was the armoured and motorized formations of the mechanized corps, while the horse-mounted elements of the cavalry corps provided increased flexibility in infiltration and fighting in difficult terrain such as large forests, or swamps, and the ability to continue mobile operations when cut off from supply lines.

Cavalry-mechanized groups were often named after their commander, for example Cavalry-Mechanized Group Pliyev named after Pliyev.

As an example, during the 1945 Soviet invasion of Manchuria, the Soviet-Mongolian Cavalry-Mechanized Group under the command of Colonel General I.A.Pliyev consisted of the following units:

- 85th Rifle Corps Headquarters
  - 59th Cavalry Division
  - 25th Mechanized Brigade
  - 27th Motorized Rifle Brigade
  - 43d Tank Brigade
  - 30th Motorcycle Regiment
  - Aviation-Mixed Division (Mongolian)
  - 5th Mongolian Cavalry Division
  - 6th Mongolian Cavalry Division
  - 7th Mongolian Cavalry Division
  - 8th Mongolian Cavalry Division
  - 7th Motorized Armored Brigade (Mongolian)
  - 3d Separate Tank Regiment (Mongolian)
  - 35th Tank Destroyer Artillery Brigade
  - 1914th Antiaircraft Artillery Regiment
  - 1917th Antiaircraft Artillery Regiment
  - 60th Guards Mortar Regiment (Rocket Launchers)
  - 3d Artillery Regiment (Mongolian)

The formation operated in two march columns during the first stage of the battle, advancing rapidly against light opposition, preceded by forward detachments:

Column 1:

- 25th Mechanized Brigade
- 43d Tank Brigade
- 267th Tank Regiment

Column 2:

- 27th Mechanized Rifle Brigade
- 7th Armored Car Brigade
- 30th Motorcycle Regiment

== Tactics ==
Cavalry-mechanized groups were used during the second half of the Soviet-German War, following the successful breaching of a German defense. They would then be inserted to penetrate deep into the rear of the German lines and interrupt supply and reinforcement movements there. This was a risky task, shown for example by the maneuver and conduction of Cavalry-Mechanized Group Pliyev during the Battle of Debrecen in Hungary, in autumn 1944.

Cavalry units in the Red Army usually fought as dismounted infantry. Only when they faced a completely disorganised enemy, for example during the battle of the Korsun Pocket in 1944, or when they were themselves in a desperate situation, such as during Operation Mars in 1942, would they undertake a traditional cavalry charge.

== After the Second World War ==
Cavalry was widely seen as anachronistic by the start of World War II. The Red Army was the only army to make use of cavalry formations in full-scale combat during the war, and despite the successful use of cavalry formations by the Red Army during the war, the last cavalry division, 4th Guards Cavalry Division, was disbanded in 1955.
