= Issa Pliyev =

Soviet military commander (1903–1979)

Issa Alexandrovich Pliyev
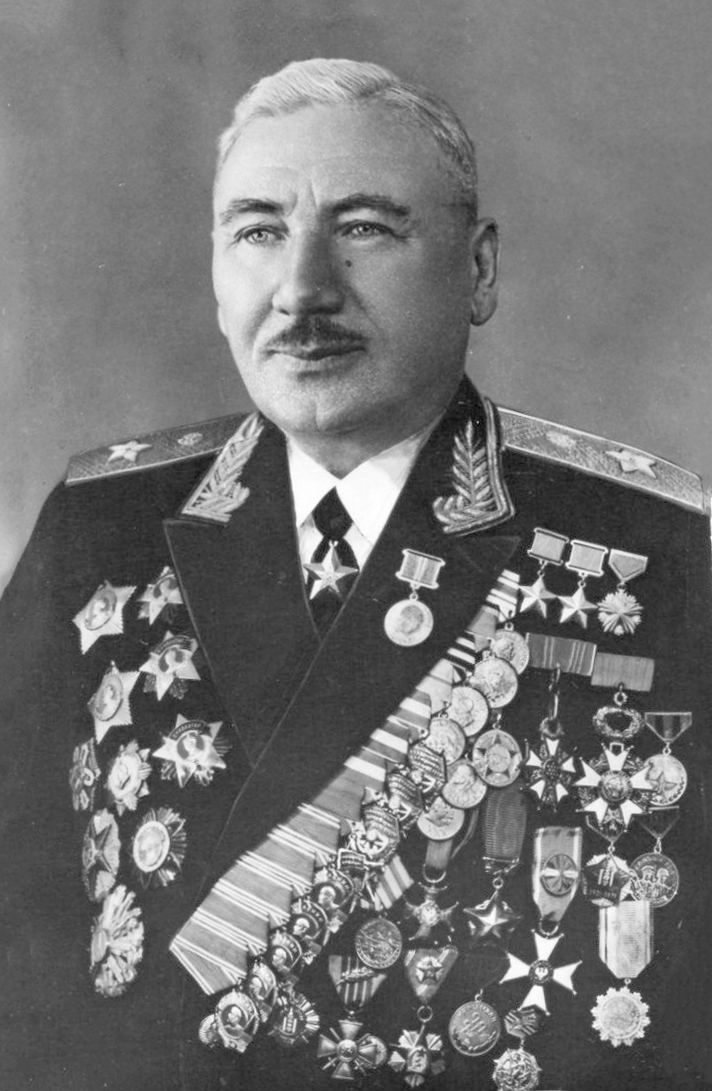
- Born: 25 November 1903; Stariy Batakoyurt, Russian Empire (now North Ossetia, Russia)
- Died: 6 February 1979 (aged 75); Moscow, Soviet Union
- Military career
- Allegiance: Soviet Union
- Branch: Soviet Army
- Service years: 1926–1968
- Rank: General of the Army
- Commands: 5th Cavalry Division; 4th Guards Cavalry Corps; 2nd Guards Cavalry Corps; 1st Guards Cavalry Mechanized Group; Mobile Group Pliyev; Soviet Mongolian Cavalry Mechanized Group; 57th Army; 13th Army; North Caucasus Military District; Soviet Ground Forces in Cuba
- Conflicts: World War II; Battle of Moscow; Battle of Stalingrad; Battle of Kursk; Dnieper–Carpathian Offensive; Battle of Romania; Battle of Debrecen; Battle of Prague; Invasion of Manchuria; Novocherkassk riots; Cuban Missile Crisis; Operation Anadyr
- Awards: Twice Hero of the Soviet Union

Issa Alexandrovich Pliyev (also spelled as Pliev; Iron Ossetic: Плиты Алыксандры фырт Иссæ; Russian: Исса́ Алекса́ндрович Пли́ев; 25 November [O.S. 12 November] 1903 — 6 February 1979) was a Soviet military commander. Pliyev rose to become the premier cavalry general of the Soviet Army. He became an Army General (1962), twice Hero of the Soviet Union (16 April 1944 and 8 September 1945), Hero of the Mongolian People's Republic (1971).

During World War II, Pliyev commanded several mechanized cavalry units, ranging from regiments to army corps. The military historians David Glantz and Jonathan House described Pliyev as a "great practitioner of cavalry operations in adverse terrain". However, Pliyev became known in the West largely for his involvement in the Cuban Missile Crisis.

== Early life and career ==
Issa Pliyev started his military career in the Red Army in 1922, graduating from the Leningrad Cavalry School in 1926, from the Frunze Military Academy in 1933 and from the Soviet General Staff Academy. He joined the Communist party in 1926.

Upon graduation from the Red Army Frunze Military Academy he was appointed head of the operational department for the headquarters of the 5th Stavropol Cavalry Division named after M. F. Blinov in the Ukrainian Military District. From June 1936, he was an instructor at the staff of the Joint Military School of the Mongolian People's Revolutionary Army in Ulaanbaatar. From February 1939, he commanded the 48th Cavalry Regiment of the 6th Cavalry Division of the Belarusian Special Military District. At the head of the regiment, he took part in the campaign of the Red Army in Western Belarus in September 1939.

== World War II ==
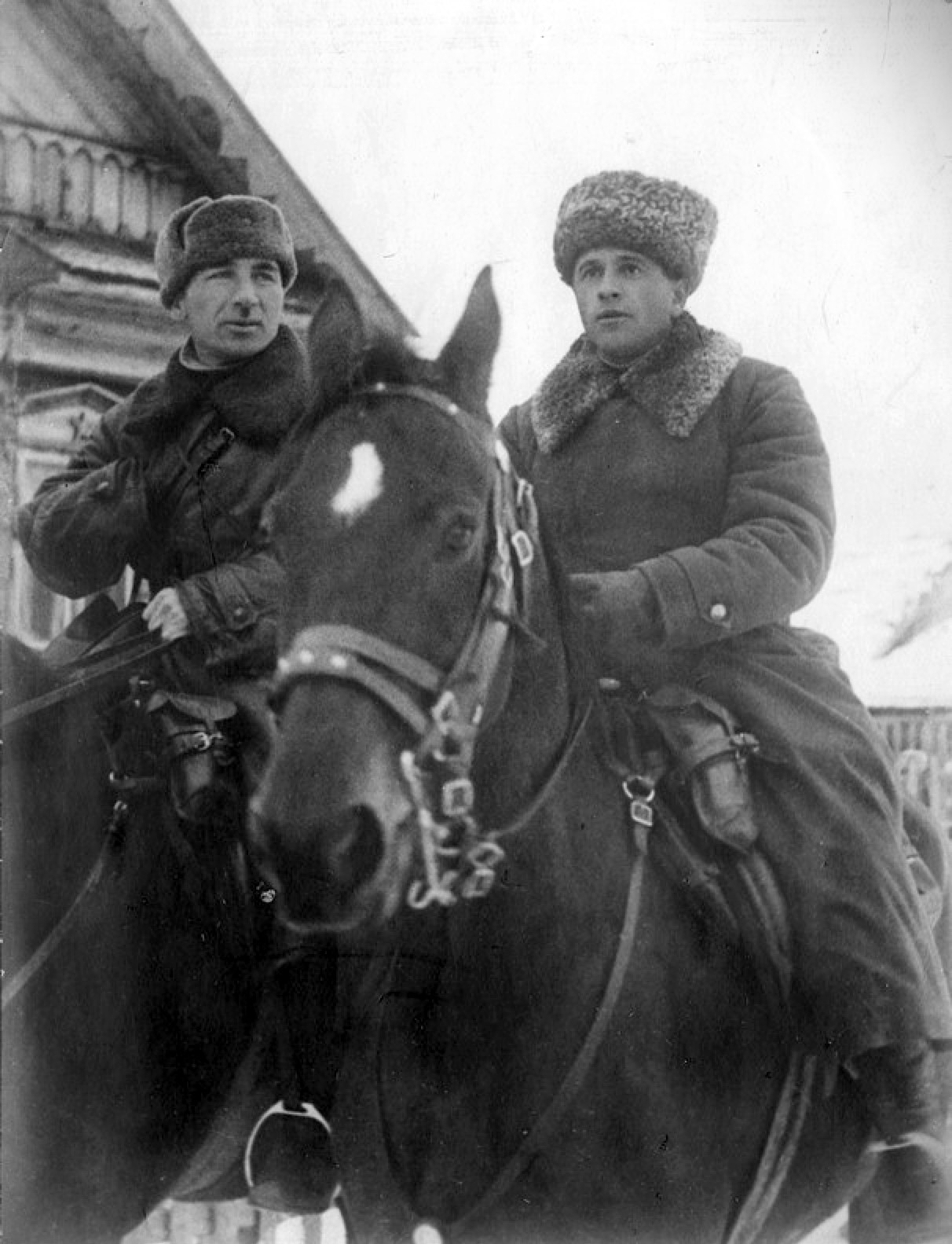
Pliyev (left) and Lev Dovator (right), Moscow Oblast, November 1941

At the start of the invasion of the Soviet Union, Pliyev commanded the 50th Cavalry Division (renamed 3rd Guards Cavalry Division). During the early stages of Operation Barbarossa the unit was sent under the command of the 30th army, being moved to the 22nd Army afterwards. He later participated in two raids on the rear of Army Group "Center" during the Battle of Smolensk, under the command of Dovator.

His unit participated in the Battle of Moscow and the Battle of Stalingrad. Pliyev served as 2nd in command under Lev Dovator who fought alongside Rokossovsky with the crucial 16th Army, holding the center defensive line of Moscow. In Soviet Union and Russia 28 Panfilov's men became a symbol of defense for propaganda. The cavalrymen of Dovator were however mainly forgotten, even though they held their line alongside Panfilov's men.

With Dovator killed in action and Belov promoted to army commander, Pliev was able to apply deep battle operations better than any other general, which would eventually make him the only Soviet cavalry personnel to be awarded two Heroes of the Soviet Union. His valuable experience serving directly under Lev Dovator while planning and fighting with the best especially in the early stages of the war made him stand out among others. When more tanks were added to the cavalry corps, Pliyev became the pioneer in the new cavalry mechanized groups who immediately proved themselves in battle, which made him well respected among his peers and soldiers. His forces, along with that of Pavel Belov, were considered the most successful cavalry units of the Battle of Moscow.

During the Battle of Stalingrad, the horsemen proved themselves once again, as Pliyev's forces were the first to complete the encirclement of the German 6th Army, trapping 330,000 men inside the pocket. Issa would later command a cavalry-mechanized group consisting of 4th Guards Cavalry Corps and 4th Mechanized Corps during the Bereznegovatoye–Snigirevka Offensive along the Black Sea coast, as part of the 3rd Ukrainian Front under Army General Rodion Malinovsky.

Pliyev especially distinguished himself in the Bereznegovato-Snigireva and Odessa offensive operations conducted one after the other in March–April 1944. The mechanized cavalry group of General Pliev, introduced into the raid on the enemy's rear in March 1944, ensured the encirclement and defeat of units from the 6th German Army. In April, the mechanized cavalry group forced the Southern Bug River, cut the enemy's main communications and contributed to the capture of a number of large settlements by the front's troops, including the city of Odessa.

By the decree of the Presidium of the Supreme Soviet of the USSR dated April 16, 1944, Lieutenant General Issa Alexandrovich Pliev was awarded the title of Hero of the Soviet Union with the award of the Order of Lenin and the Gold Star medal for his skillful command of the troops, along with personal courage and heroism.

During Operation Bagration in the summer of 1944, part of the 1st Belorussian Front, Pliyev's cavalry-mechanized group attacked towards Slutsk. According to Glantz and House, the unit was highly successful in exploiting the operational breakthrough. In the fall of 1944, he commanded a mechanized cavalry group consisting of two divisions during the Battle of Debrecen. The group was returned to the 3rd Ukrainian Front, where on October 3, 1944, General Pliyev was put in charge of the 4th and 6th Guards Cavalry Corps and the 7th Mechanized Corps, units created with the aim of a deep breakthrough into the enemy rear in the Debrecen operation on Hungarian territory. The breakthrough was successful, but once the enemy managed to cut the group's communications, they spent over 10 days fighting in the enemy's rear, dodging enemy tank attacks and delivering unexpected retaliatory strikes. Some occupied Hungarian cities had to be abandoned, but in the end the situation was turned in favor of the Soviet troops and Debrecen was taken.

The operations of Lieutenant General Pliev's 1st Guards Cavalry Mechanized Group demonstrated the power of deep operations as it fought throughout Ukraine, Eastern Europe and into Germany. He ended the war in command of the Soviet-Mongolian Cavalry-Mechanized Group of the Transbaikal Front in Manchuria, fighting against the Japanese Kwantung Army. For his success in defeating the Kwantung Army, he was awarded his second Gold Star Medal of the Hero of the Soviet Union.

== Post-war ==
After the war, Pliyev continued his career in the military, and took command of the Stavropol Military District in February 1946. In June he became commander of the 9th Mechanized Army, stationed in Romania with the Southern Group of Forces, and he commanded 13th Army between February 1947 and 1949, in western Ukraine. Pliyev graduated from higher academic courses at the Military Academy of the General Staff in 1949, and in April took command of the 4th Army in the Transcaucasian Military District. In June 1955, he was appointed First Deputy commander of the North Caucasus Military District, succeeding to command of the district in April 1958.

On 27 April 1962, Pliyev was promoted to Army General. In June his troops took part in suppressing Novocherkassk Riots. During the Cuban Missile Crisis he was the commander of a Group of Soviet forces as part of Operation Anadyr in Cuba from July 1962 to May 1963. After returning from Cuba, he assumed command of the North Caucasus Military District once more.

In June 1968, Pliyev became an advisor for the Ministry of Defense of the USSR's Group of Inspectors General, a position for elderly senior officers. He lived in Rostov-on-Don and died on 6 February 1979 in Moscow. Pliyev was buried in the Walk of Fame in Vladikavkaz.

== Awards ==
Pliyev was awarded five Orders of Lenin, three Orders of the Red Banner, two Orders of Suvorov (1st Class), Order of Kutuzov (1st Class), numerous medals and nine foreign orders. He was decorated twice Hero of the Soviet Union.

== Books authored ==
- Плиев И.А.. Через Гоби и Хинган (Through the Gobi Desert and the Khingan Mountains). 1965.
- Плиев И.А.. Конец Квантунской армии (The End of the Kwantung Army). 1969

== See also ==
- Soviet invasion of Manchuria
- Pavel Belov
- Lev Dovator

== Cited sources ==
- Glantz, David; House, Jonathan (2015). When Titans Clashed: How the Red Army Stopped Hitler. University Press of Kansas. ISBN 9780700621217.
