= 255th Separate Chechen-Ingush Cavalry Regiment =

- Active: May 1942 – February 1943
- Country: Soviet Union
- Branch: Red Army
- Type: Cavalry
- Engagements: Battle of Stalingrad

The 255th Separate Chechen-Ingush Cavalry Regiment was a military unit of the Red Army during World War II which was active from 1942 to 1943.

== Formation ==
=== 114th Division ===
According to a decision of the State Defense Committee of the USSR made on 13 November, 1941, the formation of the 114th Chechen-Ingush Cavalry Division was to begin in Grozny. This unit would eventually give rise to the 255th Regiment. Colonel Khadzhi-Umar Mamsurov, an Ossetian, was appointed as the division's commander, Muslim Gayrbekov was appointed commissioner, and Lieutenant Colonel Kh. Baev was appointed chief of staff.

The 114th Division consisted of the 277th, 296th, and 315th Cavalry Regiments, a unit of horse artillery, and supporting forces. Despite signing up to recruit 614 more volunteers than was mandated by the state, the division was in very poor condition early in its formation. It did not receive weapons, it had too few officers, and almost 500 recruits deserted. An inspection by the Inspector General of the Cavalry of the Red Army in March 1942 reported that the division was not capable of combat.

As a result of these issues, it was not possible to complete the formation of the division. In March 1942, Lavrentiy Beria, the Soviet chief of secret police in Georgia, issued an order which terminated the conscription of Chechens and Ingush. The division's commander, Mamsurov, was sent to the front where he became deputy commander of the 7th Cavalry Corps of the Bryansk Front. Commissioner Gayrbekov was recalled to the post of secretary for a regional committee. The Stavka order disbanding the division together with eight other newly formed national cavalry divisions and eleven understrength divisions in the active army stipulated that personnel of disbanded units would be used to bring other existing cavalry divisions up to strength due to a shortage of cavalry. The order stipulated that a separate cavalry regiment would be formed from the 114th, planned to become part of the 17th Cavalry Corps.

=== Influence of National Politics ===
The disbandment of the 114th Division, apparently due to failing its check by the Inspector General, was actually likely due to the influence of national politics on the Red Army. The formation of the 114th Division was rife with oddities. After staffing, the division was not accredited with the People's Commissariat of Defense. Additionally, neither the republic nor the leadership of the North Caucasus Military District supplied the new division with horses, housing, food, or fodder for four months after its formation. Finally, the division's final commander, Colonel Mamsurov, was at one point the head of a sabotage directorate of the Intelligence Directorate of the General Staff. Historian Timur Muzaev claims that it could only have been by deliberate action by Colonel Mamsurov that the 114th Division could have come to such disarray.

In many cases, political motives trumped the needs of the army when in came to the formation of national military units, such as those drawn from the Chechens and Ingush. The formation of such divisions became an important element of national policy in the region. During this time period, the Soviet Union was preparing to deport the Chechens and Ingush.

The order to disband the division, allegedly as a result of the poor inspection it had undergone, was signed two days prior to the inspection.

=== 255th Regiment ===
The 255th Separate Cavalry Regiment was formed from the personnel of the 114th Division in accordance with the order that disbanded the division. Major Yaponts Abadiyev was appointed commander and Major Movlid Visaitov was appointed chief of staff. However, on 13 May 1942 Abadiyev received new orders and Visaitov was appointed commander of the regiment.

In an attempt to meet the demands of local volunteers, the local Military Council also formed a Separate Reserve Chechen-Ingush Cavalry Division. However, these formations were not enough to organize all of the volunteers. A report from the command of the regiment stated:

Many of the fighters who remained after the formation of the Separate Cavalry Regiment and the Reserve Cavalry Division, not wanting to remain in the rear, came to command and demanded that they be included in the lists of fighters of the aforementioned national units, which indicates the desire of the Chechens and Ingush to participate in the Patriotic War against the Nazi invaders.

As a result, many Chechens and Ingush were sent to other regular units of the Red Army, including cavalry regiments, artillery and mortar regiments, reconnaissance divisions, and air defense divisions. As part of these units, the Chechens and Ingush participated in the battles of Stalingrad, Kursk, and other engagements during World War II.

== Combat Record ==
On 4 June 1942, the regiment was transferred to the Special Cavalry Corps under Major General Boris Pogrebov. The Special Corps also included the 115th Kabardino-Balkarian and 110th Kalmyk Cavalry Divisions.

The regiments was an active part of the Battle of Stalingrad from the very beginning of the engagement. It was included in the task force of General Vasily Chuikov as part of the 64th Army and operated on the distant approaches to the city of Stalingrad. On 3 August, the regiment was covering the withdrawal of Soviet troops and was attacked by elements of the German 4th Panzer Army near the Kotelnikovo rail station. During the battle, the regiment knocked out four German tanks and killed several dozen enemy soldiers. However, the regiment also suffered heavy losses in personnel, wagon trains, and horses. Under pressure by the superior German forces, which had close air support, the regiment was forced to retreat.

== Disbandment ==
Over the course of the Battle of Stalingrad, the regiment suffered heavy losses. Since the Germans had advanced far into the North Caucasus, it was not possible to reinforce the regiment from Checheno-Ingushetia. Therefore, it was decided to create two units of reconnaissance cavalry from the remnants of the regiment and integrate them into the 4th Cavalry Corps under Lieutenant General Timofey Shapkin.

== Bibliography ==
- S.A. Argaztseva, Y.F. Boldyrev, M.V. Vagabov. Я твой солдат, Stalingrad. 2003.
- P.P. Brikel. Повесть о последнем рейде. 1984.
- Movlid Visaitov. От Терека до Эльбы. Воспоминания бывшего командира гвардейского полка о боевом пути в годы Великой Отечественной войны. Chechen-Ingush Publishing House. 1966.
- K.A. Gakaev. И помнит мир спасенный: По велению октября / Герисханов И. А. 1987.
- V. Grossman. Сталинград. Сентябрь 1942 – январь 1943. 1943.
- Z.K. Dzhambulatova. Сыны Чечено-Ингушетии на фронтах Великой Отечественной войны 1941—1945 годов. — М.: Известия Чечено-Ингушского научно-исследовательского института истории, языка и литературы. 1960
- Oshaev Khalid. Слово о полку чечено-ингушском. 2004.
- V.I. Filkin. Партийная организация Чечено-Ингушетии в годы Великой Отечественной войны Советского Союза.
