= 4th Cavalry Corps (Soviet Union) =

- Active: 1st formation: January 1928 – early 1938; 2nd formation: June 1938 – July 1940; 3rd formation: January 1941 – January 1946
- Allegiance: Soviet Union
- Branch: Soviet Red Army
- Engagements: World War II; 2nd formation: Soviet invasion of Poland; 3rd formation: Battle of Stalingrad; Battle of Kursk
- Battle honours: named for Budyonny (1st formation)

Commanders
- Notable commanders: Iosif Apanasenko; Vasily Popov; Dmitry Ryabyshev

The 4th Cavalry Corps was a cavalry corps of the Soviet Red Army, formed three times.

The corps first existed between 1928 and 1938 in the North Caucasus as a territorial unit, and was a Cossack unit for the last two years of its existence. Reformed in June 1938, the corps fought in the Soviet invasion of Poland in September 1939 and converted into a mechanized corps in the summer of 1940. Reformed in Central Asia in January 1941, the corps served in the Anglo-Soviet invasion of Iran in August of that year, returning to Central Asia in the fall of 1941 to receive three new cavalry divisions. It remained there until September 1942, when it departed for the Stalingrad Front. During Operation Uranus, the Soviet counteroffensive in the Battle of Stalingrad, the 4th Cavalry Corps was intended to act as an exploitation force, but due to being understrength it was surrounded and suffered heavy losses in November and December. Its remnants did not disband until May and June 1943.

== History ==
=== First Formation ===
The 4th Cavalry Corps was first formed as the 4th Territorial Cavalry Corps in January 1928 at Rostov-on-Don, part of the North Caucasus Military District. Commanded by Mikhail Batorsky until October 1929, the 4th Territorial Corps included the 5th Stavropol, 11th North Caucasus Territorial and 12th Territorial Cavalry Divisions. On 2 March 1930, the 11th Cavalry Division became the 10th Cavalry Division. Corps headquarters were later moved to Armavir, where the 4th Separate Cavalry Communications Battalion began to form on 1 October 1931. In 1932, the corps' 5th Cavalry Division relocated to Ukraine and became part of the 2nd Cavalry Corps. Iosif Apanasenko commanded the corps between November 1932 and 29 October 1935.

On 25 April 1933, the corps received the honorific "named for Budyonny," in honor of Soviet cavalry commander Semyon Budyonny. By 1935 the corps also included the 56th Separate Corps Aviation Detachment at Novocherkassk. On 21 April 1936, the corps added the 13th Don Cossack Cavalry Division, formed from a cavalry regiment of the 12th Division, and it became a Cossack unit on 13 February 1937, when the Red Army reintroduced Cossack designations. During the Great Purge, the corps went through several commanding officers: Komkor Ivan Kosogov, who took command on 7 February 1936, was arrested on 26 May 1937. His replacement, Kombrig Arkady Borisov, was fired on 11 July, and Komdiv Yakov Sheko, who replaced Borisov, was arrested on 10 August. Kombrig Vasily Popov then took command and led the corps for the rest of its existence. The corps was disbanded in early 1938.

=== Second Formation ===
The headquarters of the 4th Cavalry Corps was formed from the headquarters of the 1st Red Cossack Cavalry Corps in June 1938, part of the Kiev Military District. The corps included the 9th, 32nd and the 34th Cavalry Divisions when it was formed, and was commanded throughout its existence by Komkor Dmitry Ryabyshev. The 9th Cavalry Division transferred to the 5th Cavalry Corps in July 1939. In September, the 4th Corps fought in the Soviet invasion of Poland, occupying what is now western Ukraine. It was part of the 12th Army at the beginning of the attack on 17 September. The 26th Separate Tank Brigade was attached to the corps for the invasion. After the invasion, the 16th Cavalry Division from the 5th Cavalry Corps replaced the 32nd, which transferred to the 5th Corps, on 11 October 1939. In 1940, the corps headquarters was at Drohobych, and its subordinate units were at Drohobych, Halych, and Stanislavov. On 7 July 1940, the corps headquarters was used to create the headquarters of the 8th Mechanized Corps.

=== Third Formation ===
The Soviet advance during Operation Uranus, November 1942.

The corps was reformed between January and 18 March 1941 in the Central Asian Military District, under the command of Lieutenant General Timofey Shapkin. It included the 18th, 20th, and the 21st Mountain Cavalry Divisions. In mid-July, the 44th Cavalry Division replaced the 21st. During August, the corps fought in the Anglo-Soviet invasion of Iran, during which it was part of the 53rd Army. After crossing the Iranian border, the corps entered Mashhad, Iran's second largest city, on 28 August. In September, the 39th Mountain Cavalry Division replaced the 44th, and in November the corps headquarters and assets were transferred back to Central Asia without its front line units. The corps soon received three new formations - the 61st, 63rd, and 81st Cavalry Divisions.

With these divisions, the corps left Central Asia for the Stalingrad Front at the end of September 1942. On 10 October, the corps officially transferred to the front. The corps fought in the Battle of Stalingrad from 11 October to 31 December 1942. Entering the battle without the disbanded 97th Division, the corps became part of the 51st Army and fought in Operation Uranus in November.

In the plan for this operation, 4th Cavalry was intended to, first, act in an exploitation role once the infantry and armor of 51st Army broke through the positions of 4th Romanian Army and, second, to create an outer encirclement front to defend against expected German counterattacks to relieve the encircled German Sixth Army. The second objective was overly optimistic, because the corps was understrength in men, horses, and most equipment. To begin with, it had only two divisions. Even based on a two-division establishment, the corps was understrength in most categories:

- Cavalrymen – 10,284/-1,172
- Horses – 9,284/-988
- Rifles and carbines – 7,354/-1,777
- Submachine guns – 556/-757
- Light machine guns – 264/-64
- Heavy (DShK) machine guns – 0/-61
- Antitank rifles – 140/-11
- 76mm artillery – 32/-26
- 45 mm antitank – 24
- 37 mm antiaircraft – 8/-4
- 120 mm mortars – 16
- 82 mm mortars – 45/+10
- 50 mm mortars – 118/+10

As can be seen, 4th Cavalry was deficient in all categories except antitank guns and mortars.

In early December, as the Axis forces were preparing for Operation Winter Storm, most of the corps was surrounded near Kotelnikovo and suffered heavy losses. At the time 60% of its personnel were Kazakh, Kirghiz, Uzbek, Tajik or Turkmen, all Central Asian ethnicities. After breaking out of the pocket, the corps fought to repulse German relief operations, during which corps deputy commander Major General Yakub Kuliev was mortally wounded by a German air strike on 19 December.

By 1 January the corps had been transferred to the 2nd Guards Army, and by 1 February its remnants were directly subordinated to the Southern Front. On 21 March, the corps was transferred to the Southwestern Front. Shapkin died of a brain hemorrhage on the next day, and was replaced by Major General Mikhail Maleyev on 25 March. On 27 April it was withdrawn to the Reserve of the Supreme High Command in the Rossosh area, where it became part of the Steppe Military District. On 4 May, the 61st and 81st Divisions were disbanded. The corps' headquarters continued to exist, but was itself absorbed, along with rear units, into the 7th Guards Cavalry Corps, several months later.

== Commanders ==
The corps' first formation is known to have been commanded by the following officers.

- Mikhail Batorsky (January 1928 – October 1929)
- Iosif Apanasenko (November 1932 – 29 October 1935)
- Komkor Ivan Kosogov (7 February 1936 – 26 May 1937; arrested)
- Kombrig Arkady Borisov (May – 11 July 1937; fired)
- Komdiv Yakov Sheko (July – 10 August 1937; arrested)
- Kombrig (promoted to Komdiv 17 February 1938) Vasily Popov (1937–1938)

The corps' second formation was commanded by the following officer.

- Komkor Dmitry Ryabyshev (June 1938 – July 1940)

The corps' third formation was commanded by the following officers.

- Lieutenant General Timofey Shapkin (18 January 1941 – 22 March 1943)
- Major General Mikhail Maleyev (25 March – 4 June 1943)

== Organization ==
On 17 September 1939, the corps included the following units.

- 32nd Cavalry Division
- 34th Cavalry Division
- 26th Separate Tank Brigade
