= Cavalry division (Soviet Union) =

Military formation of the USSR

The cavalry division (Russian: кавалерийская дивизия) of the Soviet Union's Red Army was a type of military formation that existed from the early days of the Russian Civil War until the early 1950s when they became obsolete with the rise of mechanized warfare.

== Cavalry divisions in the Russian Civil War ==
In June 1918, the Revolutionary Military Council (RVSR) decided to form three cavalry divisions. On 3 August, the People's Commissariat for Military Affairs drew up tables of organization and equipment for cavalry divisions. Authorized 7,653 personnel and 8,469 horses, a cavalry division consisted of three cavalry brigades with two four-squadron regiments each, and a horse artillery battalion of four batteries. However, by the end of the year, only the Moscow Cavalry Division had been formed, and elements of others were included in the cavalry of field armies. On 26 December, the RVSR increased the authorized strength of a cavalry division to 8,346 personnel and 9,226 horses, and added a political department. On 4 January 1919, a technical squadron, consisting of telegraph-telephone and radiotelegraph departments, sapper, motorcycle, and auto platoons, was added.

In late January, the formation of cavalry divisions at the front level began, especially on the Southern Front, where the opposing White Army used large cavalry formations. The new divisions used the 1918 TO&Es and interim organization created by the Southwestern Front command, which differed in the numbers of personnel and horses. During 1919 and 1920, cavalry corps with two divisions each were formed, and later cavalry armies with multiple corps. By the end of the war, there were 27 cavalry divisions in the Red Army with a total of 88,192 personnel.

== Interwar cavalry divisions ==
After the end of the Russian Civil War, the Red Army demobilized and transitioned to a peacetime footing, resulting in the reduction of the number of cavalry divisions to eleven by the end of 1921. On 10 June 1922, RSVR released a new TO&E, which reduced the division's authorized strength to 5,598 personnel and 5,340 horses. The cavalry division was to include three two-regiment brigades, separate communications and sapper squadrons, and a horse artillery battalion, along with support units and headquarters. In November 1922, each cavalry regiment's fourth squadron was eliminated due to a shortage of horses. In 1925 three territorial cavalry divisions were formed, bringing the total number of divisions to fourteen. In June 1926, RVSR introduced a three-year plan for the cavalry branch, which eliminated brigades and reduced divisions to four four-squadron regiments. The new divisional TO&E also included two reserve squadrons, a machine-gun squadron, and divisional artillery. Territorial divisions also had a similar structure, but with six regiments and no reserve squadrons.

In 1931, due to the increasing mechanization of the Red Army, cavalry divisions were fully or partially reorganized to include four cavalry, one horse artillery, and one mechanized regiment with tanks and armored cars, and communications and sapper squadrons. A year later, five separate "national" cavalry brigades were expanded into divisions, initially retaining the original numbers but in 1936 were renumbered 17 through 21. Their national designations were removed in the summer of 1940. As a result of these reorganizations, the Red Army now had 20 cavalry divisions, divided into 16 full-strength (including five mountain cavalry), three territorial, and one newly formed kolkhoz division. The People's Commissariat for Defense approved a new plan in March 1935, which proposed to form nine new cavalry divisions numbered 23 through 31, and transfer territorial divisions to full strength. In August a new TO&E was created, authorizing a strength of 6,600 personnel for a regular cavalry division with four cavalry, mechanized, and horse artillery regiments, and separate communications and sapper squadrons, totaling 97 guns, 74 tanks, and 212 cars. In April 1936 five Cossack divisions were formed from other cavalry divisions, resurrecting the traditions of the old Cossack units. By 1936 the Red Army included 36 cavalry divisions, broken down as follows: 20 regular divisions with 6,600 men each, four reinforced divisions with 7,600 men each, 3 territorial divisions with 3,500 men, and five mountain divisions with 2,600 men each.

A new cavalry division TO&E was released in March 1938. The mechanized regiment was eliminated and replaced by a tank regiment, and the horse artillery regiment was reduced to a battalion. Reinforced cavalry divisions in the Far East retained the mechanized and horse artillery regiments, while mountain cavalry divisions included only three cavalry divisions and a mountain-horse artillery battalion. As a result of the increasing role of tank and mechanized units, cavalry lost its importance and began to drastically decline. By the beginning of 1939 the number of cavalry divisions dropped to 26 as divisions disbanded or were reduced in size. Large cuts after the end of the Winter War in spring 1940 further reduced the number of cavalry divisions to 13.

== Cavalry divisions in World War II ==
Regular Red Army cavalry divisions in 1941 had four cavalry regiments, a horse artillery battalion (eight 76mm guns and eight 122mm howitzers), a tank regiment (64 BT-series tanks), an anti-aircraft battalion (eight 76mm anti-aircraft guns and two batteries of AA machine guns), a signals squadron, a field engineer squadron and other rear echelon support units and sections.

A cavalry regiment, in turn, consisted of four sabre squadrons, a machine-gun squadron (16 heavy machine guns and four 82mm mortars), a regimental artillery battery (four 76mm and four 45mm of instrument), an anti-aircraft battery (three 37mm guns and three quadrupled Maxim machine guns).

The total authorized strength of a cavalry division included 8,968 personnel and 7,625 horses, the cavalry regiment respectively had 1,428 personnel and 1,506 horses. By 1943, a cavalry division was authorized 6,000 men and often organized into corps of three divisions that were reinforced by artillery, tank, and assault gun elements.

The cavalry corps were of two-divisional composition and approximately corresponded to a motorised division, possessing somewhat less mobility and lesser weight of artillery volley.

At the commencement of the Second World War there were thirteen cavalry divisions (nine regular and four mountain) in the Red Army, mostly concentrated in four cavalry corps. Their dispositions in June 1941 were:

- Kiev Special Military District - 5th Cavalry Corps Russian: 5-й кавалерийский корпус

3rd Bessarabian Cavalry Division named for Kotovsky Russian: 3-й Бессарабская им. Г.И. Котовского кавалерийская дивизия
14th Cavalry Division named for Parkhomenko Russian: 14-й им. Пархоменко кавалерийская дивизия

- Odessa Military District - 2nd Cavalry Corps Russian: 2-й кавалерийский корпус

5th Cavalry Division named for M.F.Blinov Russian: 5-й им. М.Ф. Блинова кавалерийсккая дивизия
9th Crimean Cavalry Division Russian: 9-й Крымсккая кавалерийсккая дивизия

- Formed in July 1941 at Urup from Kuban Cossacks, and at Stavropol from the Terek Cossacks population were respectively the 50th and 53rd Cavalry divisions.

The rapid destruction of Soviet mechanized forces in the summer and autumn of 1941 resulted in a rapid expansion of cavalry units to provide the Red Army a mobile, if not armored, force. This expansion produced some 87 new cavalry divisions by early 1942, many of which were later disbanded as the Red Army rebuilt its tank and mechanized formations. 17 of the cavalry divisions were granted Guards status and renumbered accordingly.

== Cavalry divisions after World War II ==
At the end of World War II, the Red Army included 26 cavalry divisions, which by the end of 1946 had mostly been disbanded or converted into mechanized divisions. Between 1946 and 1954 cavalry divisions included three cavalry regiments, a tank squadron which in January 1947 was expanded into a regiment, separate artillery, anti-aircraft, and anti-tank battalions, separate reconnaissance, sapper, communications, and chemical defense squadrons, medical and auto-transport battalions, and logistics units. In 1946, the 1st, 3rd, 4th, and 5th Guards Cavalry Corps were downsized into divisions. At the same time the 39th and 59th Cavalry Divisions were redesignated the 6th and 7th Cavalry Divisions, respectively. Over the next few years the remaining divisions were disbanded or converted, with the last to disband being the 4th Guards Cavalry Division in April 1955.

== See also ==
- Cavalry Divisions of the Soviet Army - list of Red Army cavalry divisions during World War II
