= Movlid =

Movlid is a given name. Notable people with the name include:

- Movlid Khaybulaev (born 1990), Russian mixed martial artist
- Movlid Visaitov (1914–1986), Chechen Red Army colonel
