= Vasily Popov (Soviet general) =

Soviet general (1894–1967)

Vasily Stepanovich Popov
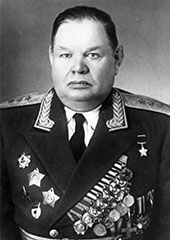
- Born: 8 January 1894; Don Host Oblast, Russian Empire
- Died: 2 July 1967 (aged 73) Moscow, Soviet Union
- Allegiance: Russian Empire; Soviet Union
- Service years: 1916–1917 (Russian Empire); 1918–1959 (Soviet Union)
- Rank: Colonel General
- Commands: 4th Cavalry Corps; 28th Rifle Corps; 10th Army; 70th Army; 43rd Army; 10th Guards Army
- Conflicts: World War I; Russian Civil War; Polish–Soviet War; World War II; Winter War; Eastern Front
- Awards: Hero of the Soviet Union; Order of Lenin; Order of the Red Banner; Order of the Red Star; Order of Suvorov; Order of Kutuzov

Vasily Stepanovich Popov (Russian: Василий Степанович Попов; 8 January 1894 – 2 July 1967) was a Soviet general and Hero of the Soviet Union.

He fought for the Imperial Russian Army in World War I, attaining the rank of Praporshchik. He fought for the Bolsheviks in the subsequent civil war and in the war against Poland. He was made a Kombrig (brigade commander) on 26 November 1935. As commander of the 28th Rifle Corps, he took part in the Soviet-Finnish War in 1940 and was awarded the Red Banner Order. He was made a major general in June 1940 and a lieutenant general in June 1942.

== World War II ==
When the German attack on the Soviet Union began on 22 June 1941, his 28th Rifle Corps was deployed to the 4th Army on the Western Front and was forced to withdraw from the Brest region towards Kobryn and Bobruisk. At the beginning of July, his corps was withdrawn to the reserve and from July 15, in the Propoisk area, participated in defensive military operations on the left bank of the Sosch. During these hostilities, Popov was seriously injured and, after his recovery in September 1941, was appointed deputy commander of the logistics department of the 50th Army.

In January 1942, he was appointed commander of the 10th Army on the western front. His troops carried out counterattacks in the area southeast of Moscow near Tula and liberated the cities of Mikhailov and Jepifan. In the summer of 1943, his army took part in the Smolensk Operation, in which the German defense at Kirov was broken and the advance towards Roslawl, Snigirjowka and Tschaussy took place. The 10th Army defended the front on the Pronja River until spring 1944. In April 1944 Popow was appointed deputy commander of the 1st Belarusian Front and in May 1944 of the same year he was appointed commander of the 70th Army. The 70th Army together with the 61st and 28th Army carried out the encirclement of German units in the Brest area during the Lublin–Brest Offensive from the south-west. On 26 July 1944 he was raised to the rank of Colonel General. During the East Prussian Offensive, the army advancing from the Serok bridgehead broke through the enemy's defense and then liberated the city of Modlin. From February to March 1945 his army took part in the East Pomeranian Offensive and took part in the liberation of the city of Gdansk. During the Stettin-Rostock operation, the 70th Army operated as part of the 2nd Belarusian front towards Neubrandenburg. After crossing the Oder, the German Stettin Group was defeated and then it reached the city of Rostock and the coast of the Baltic Sea near Wismar by 3 May.

By decree of the Presidium of the Supreme Soviet of 10 April 1945, he was honored with the title Hero of the Soviet Union together with the award of the Order of Lenin.

== Post war period ==
After the war ended, Popow was appointed commander of the 43rd Army in July 1945, which was part of the Northern Army Group. In August 1946 he became the commander of the 10th Guard Army of the Leningrad Military District. In November 1947 he was appointed head of advanced training courses for the commanders of the Rifle Divisions and then appointed head of the faculty of the Frunze Military Academy. In June 1955 he was appointed head of the Military History Faculty for the training of army officers and in January 1958 on the general staff for research work.

Popov retired from the army at the age of 65 in 1959 and died in Moscow in July. He was buried in the Novodevichy Cemetery. He was a recipient of the Order of Lenin, the Order of the Red Banner, the Order of Suvorov, the Order of Kutuzov and the Order of the Red Star.

== Bibliography ==
- Vozhakin, Mikhail Georgievich, ed. (2005). Великая Отечественная. Командармы. Военный биографический словарь [The Great Patriotic War: Army Commanders: Military Biographical Dictionary] (in Russian). Moscow: Kuchkovo Pole. ISBN 5860901135.
- Mikheenkov, Sergey Egorovich (2014). Тайна Безымянной высоты. 10-я армия в Московской и Курской битвах [Secret of Nameless Heights: 10th Army in the Moscow and Kursk Battles] (in Russian). Tsyentrpoligraf. ISBN 9785227054432.

Preceded by Yakov Sheko	Commander of the 4th Cavalry Corps; 1937–1938	Succeeded by Dmitry Ryabyshev
Preceded by Filipp Golikov	Commander of the 10th Army; February 1942 – May 1944	Succeeded by Vasily Kryuchenkin
Preceded by Alexander Ryzhov	Commander of the 70th Army; May 1944 – August 1945	Office abolished
Preceded by Afanasy Beloborodov	Commander of the 43rd Army; July 1945 – August 1946	Office abolished
Preceded by Mikhail Kazakov	Commander of the 10th Guards Army; August 1946 – May 1947	Succeeded by Ivan Lyudnikov
