= General Borisov =

General Borisov may refer to:

- Arkady Borisov (1901–1942), Soviet Red Army major general
- Vladimir Borisov (1902–1941), Soviet Red Army major general
- Vyacheslav Borisov (1955–2021), Russian Federation major general
