= Yakov Sheko =

- Sheko in the mid-1930s
- Born: 1 April 1893; Yeskovo village, Krasninsky Uyezd, Smolensk Governorate, Russian Empire
- Died: 5 June 1938 (aged 45) Moscow, Soviet Union
- Allegiance: Russian Empire; Russian SFSR; Soviet Union
- Branch: Imperial Russian Army; Red Army
- Service years: 1914–1917; 1918–1937
- Rank: Komdiv
- Commands: 1st Tomsk Cavalry Division; 20th Rifle Division; 1st Rifle Corps; 10th Cavalry Division; 4th Cavalry Corps
- Conflicts: World War I; Russian Civil War; Polish–Soviet War
- Awards: Order of the Red Banner (2)

Yakov Vasilyevich Sheko (Russian: Яков Васильевич Шеко; 1 April 1893 – 5 June 1938) was a Red Army Komdiv.

He fought in the Imperial Russian Army during World War I, rising from private to officer, and joined the Red Army in 1918, fighting in the Russian Civil War and Polish–Soviet War. He received the Order of the Red Banner for one action while a chief of staff of a division of the 1st Cavalry Army. Sheko held division and corps commands during the 1920s and 1930s, and had two stints in Mongolia as Chief of Staff of the Mongolian People's Army and as an adviser to the Mongolian War Ministry. During the Great Purge, Sheko spent several months as a cavalry corps commander due to vacancies created by arrests but was himself arrested in August 1937 and executed the next year.

== Early life, World War I, and Russian Civil War ==
Sheko was born to a peasant family on 1 April 1893 in the village of Yeskovo, Krasninsky Uyezd, Smolensk Governorate. He graduated from the village school and a city school and before 1912 worked in the village. He moved to Moscow between 1912 and 1913 to work as a laborer in a milk factory, but returned to the village for work between 1913 and 1914. While in the village he also took teaching classes and twice passed a teacher's exam.

After World War I began, Sheko was drafted into the Imperial Russian Army in late 1914, serving as a private in an automobile company stationed in Petrograd until September 1915. In November of that year, he graduated from the 3rd Peterhof Warrant Officers School to become a praporshchik and was sent to a reserve battalion in Kozlov. This assignment proved brief, as a month later Sheko was sent to the 29th Chernigov Infantry Regiment on the Western Front. He served successively as a company junior officer, company commander, and regimental adjutant, ending the war with the rank of staff captain. Following the Russian Revolution, Sheko participated in the formation of Red Guard detachments in 1917.

After joining the Red Army in June 1918, Sheko fought in the Russian Civil War. He became assistant commander of the Volkovysk Infantry Regiment in July and in August took command of the 152nd Rifle Regiment. Attaining membership of the Communist Party in January 1919, Sheko served as chief of the Sarny and Rovno combat sectors from February, before departing to study at the General Staff Academy in March. His studies were interrupted by being sent to the front in May 1920 to serve as a war correspondent and chief of the information-historical section of the staff of the 1st Cavalry Army. Serving as officer for operational staff duties for the 1st Cavalry Army commander between July and August, he served as chief of staff of the 6th Cavalry Division between 5 August and 14 December, during the 1st Cavalry Army's campaign in the Polish–Soviet War and operations against the Army of Wrangel in Crimea. Between 12 and 27 October Sheko served as acting division commander after Apanasenko was relieved of command. He was awarded the Order of the Red Banner on 29 May 1921 for capturing the Zavada station with two dismounted squadrons in fighting against the Army of Wrangel and blowing up the tracks, which was credited with cutting off the White armored trains and strengthening the superiority of the 1st Cavalry Army. As chief of staff of the 6th Cavalry Division, Sheko was mentioned in journalist Isaac Babel's 1920 Diary and Red Cavalry. Babel wrote in his entry for 14 August 1920 in 1920 Diary that Sheko ordered the killing of Polish prisoners of war, a policy condoned by division commander Iosif Apanasenko.

== Interwar period ==
After the end of the war, Sheko returned to the General Staff Academy, renamed the Military Academy of the Red Army, graduating in 1921. He served as manager of the affairs of the Red Army cavalry inspectorate until January 1922, then served as commander of the 1st Tomsk Cavalry Division between January and July. Sheko became assistant chief of staff of the 11th Rifle Corps in the Leningrad Military District in November 1922, then served as assistant commander of the 16th Rifle Division of the same district from June 1923. After simultaneously serving as commander and commissar of the 20th Rifle Division of the same district from October 1924, he went to Mongolia to serve as Chief of Staff of the Mongolian People's Army between March 1927 and July 1930. Sheko's service in satellite Mongolia was part of a regular rotation of Soviet commanders who served as chief of staff, supervising the modernization and expansion of the Mongolian army. His duties also involved participation in the creation of military regulations and training manuals. As the senior Soviet commander in Mongolia, Sheko was the head of all Soviet military advisors in the country.

Returning to the Soviet Union, Sheko became commander and commissar of the 1st Rifle Corps of the Leningrad Military District in September 1930, then assistant commander of the Moscow Military District in July 1931. He was placed at the disposal of the People's Commissariat for Military and Naval Affairs in January 1932 and returned to Mongolia as the chief military advisor to the Ministry of War of the Mongolian People's Republic. Awarded a second Order of the Red Banner on 22 February 1933 for "exceptional bravery, courage, and combat leadership," Sheko received the rank of komdiv when the Red Army introduced personal military ranks in 1935. Upon his return to the Soviet Union, Sheko became commander and commissar of the 10th Terek-Stavropol Cossack Territorial Cavalry Division, stationed in the North Caucasus Military District, in January 1936. As a result of vacancies created by the arrest of higher-ranking officers during the Great Purge, he succeeded to the command of the 4th Cossack Cavalry Corps in April 1937, serving simultaneously as its commissar until May. In July, as a prelude to his arrest by the NKVD on 10 August, Sheko was placed at the disposal of the Red Army Command Personnel Directorate. The Military Collegium of the Supreme Court of the Soviet Union sentenced Sheko to death for participating in a military conspiracy on 5 June 1938 and his execution followed in Moscow that day. He was posthumously rehabilitated on 18 July 1956.

== Awards and honors ==
Sheko was a recipient of the following decorations:

- Order of the Red Banner (1921, 1933)
- Order of the Red Banner of the Mongolian People's Republic (3)

Military offices
Preceded by Arkady Borisov	Commander of the 4th Cossack Cavalry Corps; April–July 1937	Succeeded by Vasily Popov
