= 5th Guards Cavalry Division =

5th Guards Cavalry Division (Bessarabian–Tannenberg, Order of Lenin, Red Banner, Order of Suvorov)
- Active: December 25, 1941–1946
- Disbanded: Predecessor: 3rd Cavalry Division; Successor: 5th Guards Cavalry Regiment
- Allegiance: Armed Forces of the Soviet Union
- Branch: Land
- Type: Cavalry
- Nickname(s): "Bessarabian" "Tannenberg"
- Engagements: Great Patriotic War
- Battle honours: Soviet Guard; Order of Lenin; Order of the Red Banner; Order of Suvorov

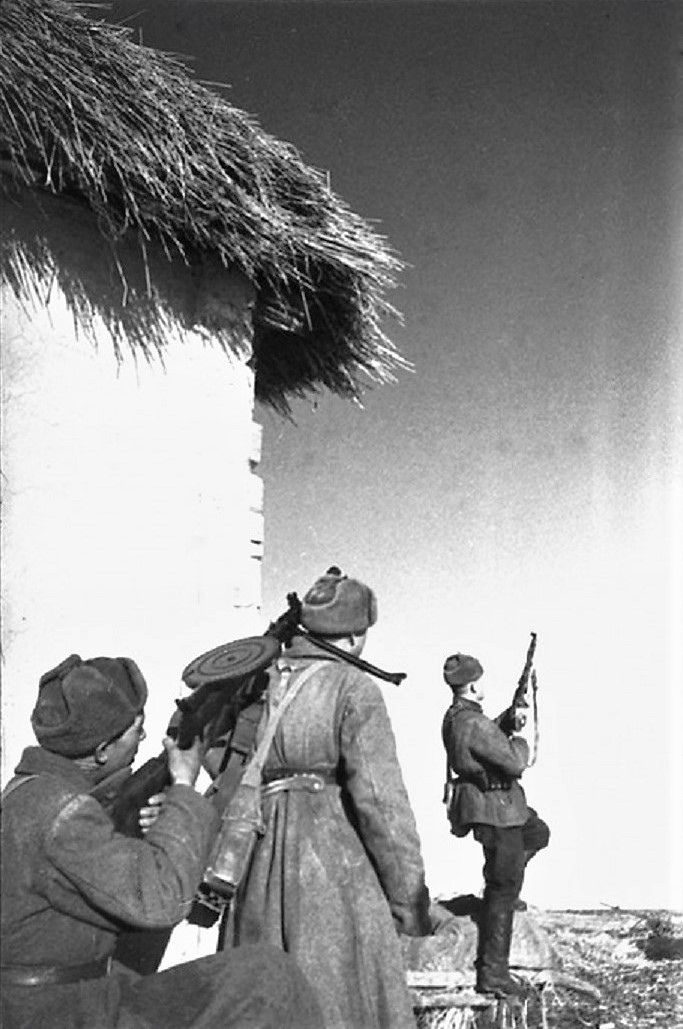
Southwestern Front. Machine gunner of the 20th Guards Cavalry Regiment, Red Army soldier Georgy Zlomanov, is firing at the plane from the Degtyarev Infantry Light Machine Gun. 1942. Photo by Mikhail Bernstein

The 5th Guards Cavalry Division (Bessarabian–Tannenberg, Order of Lenin, Grigory Kotovsky, Red Banner, Order of Suvorov) was a military unit in the Workers' and Peasants' Red Army (Armed Forces) of the Union of Soviet Socialist Republics in the Great Patriotic War.

== History ==
For the displayed heroism, courage and courage of the personnel, organization and skillful performance of combat missions on December 25, 1941, the 3rd Cavalry Division was transformed into the 5th Guards Cavalry Division. The division successfully fought as part of the 3rd Guards Cavalry Corps in the Battle of Stalingrad, in the offensive operation of the Southern Front troops in the Donbass (February 1943), in the Smolensk Offensive Operation in 1943 and the Belarusian Offensive Operation in 1944. In October 1944, units of the division reached the state border with Germany.

In East Prussia, together with other formations and units of the 3rd Guards Cavalry Corps of the 2nd Belorussian Front, they especially distinguished themselves in the battle for Tannenberg, for which the division was given the honorary name «Tannenberg».

The cavalrymen fought bravely near the city of Allenstein. In the battle near this city, the submachine gunner, Private Pyotr Dernov, repeated the feat of Matrosov, covering the enemy machine gun with his body, which interfered with the advance of the squadron. Dernov was posthumously awarded the title of Hero of the Soviet Union and forever enlisted in the lists of the 4th Squadron of the 24th Guards Cavalry Regiment.

The division was on the Elbe on 9 May 1945, Victory Day. During World War II, over 10,000 soldiers of the division were decorated, of which three were awarded the title of Hero of the Soviet Union.

After the end of the war, the division and the 3rd Guards Cavalry Corps became part of the Northern Group of Forces at Lublin, but soon withdrew to Izyaslav in the Carpathian Military District. It was reduced to the 5th Guards Cavalry Regiment in May and June 1946 when the 3rd Guards Cavalry Corps was reduced to a division. The regiment and division were disbanded in April 1948.

== Composition ==
- 17th Guards Cavalry Regiment;
- 22nd Guards Cavalry Regiment;
- 24th Guards Cavalry Regiment;
- 20th Guards Cavalry Regiment (until 20 March 1943);
- 44th Tank Regiment (until 25 December 1941);
- 104th Separate Tank Regiment (from 18 August 1943);
- 178th Guards Artillery and Mortar Regiment (7th Guards Horse Artillery Battalion);
- 39th Separate Guards Air Defense Battalion (55th Separate Anti–Aircraft Artillery Battalion, Anti–Aircraft Battery);
- 7th Guards Artillery Park;
- 5th Separate Guards Reconnaissance Squadron (5th Guards Reconnaissance Battalion);
- 6th Separate Guards Sapper Squadron;
- 5th Separate Guards Signal Squadron;
- 1st Medical Squadron;
- 6th Separate Guards Chemical Protection Squadron;
- 5th Food Transport;
- 6th Platoon for the Supply of Fuels and Lubricants;
- 3rd Divisional Veterinary Infirmary;
- 870th Field Post Station;
- 601st Field Cash Office of the State Bank.

== Command ==
During the Great Patriotic War, the division was commanded by:

- Major General Mikhail Maleev (December 25, 1941 – January 15, 1942);
- Colonel, from April 21, 1943, Major General Nikolai Chepurkin (January 30, 1942 – July 1, 1946).

== Awards and titles ==
Award (name)	Date	For what it was awarded
Bessarabian	June 17, 1924	
Named After Grigory Kotovsky	August 6, 1925	
Order of the Red Banner and the Honorary Revolutionary Red Banner	February 29, 1928	Awarded by the decree of the Presidium of the Central Executive Committee of the Soviet Union on February 29, 1928, to commemorate the tenth anniversary of the Workers' and Peasants' Red Army and commemorating military services on various fronts of the civil war from 1918–1919
Order of Lenin	November 15, 1935	
Honorary title "Guards"	December 25, 1941	Awarded by order of the People's Commissar of Defense of the Soviet Union for the heroism, courage and courage shown by the personnel, organization and skillful performance of the combat missions of the command
Honorary title "Tannenberg"	February 19, 1945	Awarded by order of the Supreme Commander–in–Chief No. 023 of February 19, 1945 for the distinction in the battles for the capture of the cities of Neidenburg, Tannenberg, Yedvabno and Allendorf – important strongholds of the German defense in East Prussia
Order of Suvorov, II Degree	June 4, 1945	Awarded by the Decree of the Presidium of the Supreme Soviet of the Soviet Union of June 4, 1945 for exemplary fulfillment of command assignments in battles against the German invaders during the capture of the cities of Anklam, Friedland, Neubrandenburg, Lychen and for the valor and courage shown in this

Division unit awards:

- 17th Guards Cavalry Regiment (Lida, Red Banner);
- 22nd Guards Cavalry Regiment (Red Banner);
- 24th Guards Cavalry Regiment (Allenstein, Red Banner, Order of Suvorov);
- 104th Separate Tank Regiment (Red Banner, Order of Kutuzov);
- 178th Guards Artillery and Mortar Regiment (Orders of Suvorov and Kutuzov);
- 6th Separate Guards Engineer Squadron (Order of Alexander Nevsky);
- 5th Separate Guards Signal Squadron (Order of the Red Star).

== Distinguished soldiers ==
- Alexander Artyushenko, Senior Sergeant of the Guard – commander of a heavy machine gun crew of the 24th Guards Cavalry Regiment;
- Stepan Belinsky, Senior Sergeant – driver–mechanic of the 104th Tank Regiment;
- Mikhail Bessonov, Foreman – tank driver of the 104th Tank Regiment;
- Andrey Volkov, Lieutenant – commander of a tank squadron of the 104th Tank Regiment;
- Pyotr Dernov, Red Army Guardsman – submachine gunner of the 24th Guards Cavalry Regiment;
- Stepan Grintsevich, Guard Senior Sergeant – squad leader of a separate reconnaissance squadron;
- Islam Kashimov, Guard Corporal – scout of the reconnaissance platoon of the 24th Guards Cavalry Regiment;
- Khanpasha Nuradilov, Guard Sergeant – commander of the machine gun platoon of the 17th Guards Cavalry Regiment;
- Peter Pepelyaev, Guard Sergeant – senior scout of the 178th Guards Artillery and Mortar Regiment;
- Victor Pershakov, Guard Private – machine gunner of the 24th Guards Cavalry Regiment;
- Efim Polozov, Guard Sergeant – scout of the reconnaissance platoon of the 24th Guards Cavalry Regiment;
- Vasily Salfetnikov, Guard Sergeant – gunner of the 76–mm gun of the 178th Guards Artillery and Mortar Regiment;
- Vasily Skarga, Guard Senior Sergeant – commander of the 82–mm mortar crew of the 24th Guards Cavalry Regiment;
- Mikhail Smykov, Guard Senior Sergeant – commander of the gun crew of the 178th Guards Artillery and Mortar Regiment;
- Vasily Sukholovsky, Guard Senior Sergeant – assistant commander of the fire platoon of the 24th Guards Cavalry Regiment.
