= 3rd Cavalry Division (Soviet Union) =

3rd Bessarabian Order of Lenin, Twice Red Banner Cavalry Division Named After Grigory Kotovsky
- 3-я Бессарабская ордена Ленина, дважды Краснознамённая кавалерийская дивизия имени Григория Котовского
- Active: 1922 – December 25, 1941
- Disbanded: Predecessor: 4th Cavalry Division (1922); Successor: 5th Guards Cavalry Division
- Allegiance: Armed Forces of the Soviet Union
- Branch: Land
- Type: Cavalry
- Nickname(s): Bessarabian
- Engagements: Russian Civil War; World War II; Invasion of Poland; Occupation of Bessarabia and Northern Bukovina; Eastern Front
- Decorations: Order of Lenin; Order of the Red Banner; Honorary Revolutionary Red Banner

The 3rd Cavalry Division was a military unit in the Workers' and Peasants' Red Army of the Armed Forces of the Union of Soviet Socialist Republics.

== History ==
The division was formed in January 1923 by renaming the 4th Cavalry Division into the 3rd Cavalry Division. The division was part of the 2nd Cavalry Corps of the Ukrainian Military District.

On June 17, 1924, the division received the name "Bessarabian". On August 6, 1925, the division was named after Grigory Kotovsky.

In 1928, the division was awarded the Honorary Revolutionary Red Banner and the Order of the Red Banner. In 1935, the division was awarded the Order of Lenin. On May 17, 1935, the Ukrainian Military District was divided into the Kiev and Kharkov Military Districts. The 2nd Cavalry Corps became part of the Kiev Military District.

On July 26, 1938, the Main Military Council of the Red Army transformed the Kiev Military District into the Kiev Special Military District and created army groups in the district. The 3rd Cavalry Division of the 2nd Cavalry Corps became part of the Cavalry Army Group of the Kiev Special Military District.

In September – October 1938, the 3rd Cavalry Division, which was part of the 2nd Cavalry Corps of the Cavalry Army Group of the Kiev Special Military District, was put on alert to provide military assistance to Czechoslovakia.

In September – October 1939, the division took part in the military campaign of the Red Army in the eastern regions of Poland – Western Ukraine. The division was part of the 2nd Cavalry Corps in the Volochisk Army Group (from September 16), the Eastern Army Group (from September 24), the 6th Army (from September 28) of the Ukrainian Front.

In June – July 1940, the division took part in a military campaign to Romania – Northern Bukovina as part of the 12th Army of the Southern Front.

In April, the command of the 2nd Cavalry Corps departed for the Moldavian Soviet Socialist Republic. The division became part of the 5th Cavalry Corps.

On June 22, 1941, on the state border in the Parkhach Region, a division that was part of the 5th Cavalry Corps of the 6th Army of the Southwestern Front entered into battle with the Nazi invaders. In extremely difficult conditions, the division was forced to retreat with battles in the direction of Volochisk, Berdichev, Kazatin, Belaya Tserkov. The division delivered strong blows to enemy troops in August–September 1941 near Rzhishchev, on the Dnepr and Psel rivers. In October – December 1941 and January 1942, the division fought defensive battles near Kharkov, participated in the defeat of the enemy's Yelets Grouping, in hostilities in the Shchigry–Kursk direction.

For the displayed heroism, courage and courage of the personnel, organization and skillful performance of combat missions on December 25, 1941, the division was transformed into the 5th Guards Cavalry Division.

== Structure ==
By the beginning of World War II, it consisted of the 34th, 60th, 99th, 158th Cavalry and 44th Tank Regiments.

== Full name ==
3rd Bessarabian Order of Lenin, Twice Red Banner Cavalry Division Named After Grigory Kotovsky.

== Division commanders ==
- Nikolay Krivoruchko (November 1922 – August 1925);
- Elisey Goryachev (June 1928 – May 1930);
- Dmitry Weinerch–Weinierch (May 1930 – November 1932);
- Daniil Serdich (November 1932 – ?);
- Nikita Mishuk (February 28, 1934 – August 16, 1937);
- Sergei Morozov (1937 – September 8, 1938);
- Vasily Terentev (September 1938 – February 1939);
- Mikhail Maleev, Major General (September 08, 1939 – December 25, 1941).

== Chiefs of staff ==
- Nikolai Chepurkin, Colonel (June 20, 1938 – December 25, 1941).

== People associated with the division ==
- Sergei Tarasov (1904–1992) – Soviet military leader, Major General. From August 1925 to December 1926, he served as a platoon commander in the 15th Cavalry Regiment in the city of Berdichev.
- Fyodor Schekotsky (1898–1969) – Soviet military leader, Major General. From July 1928 to March 1931, he served as Chief of Staff of the 15th Cavalry Regiment.

== See also ==
- Polish Campaign of the Red Army (1939)
- Accession of Bessarabia and Northern Bukovina to the Soviet Union

== Sources ==
- Red Banner Kiev. Essays on the History of the Red Banner Kiev Military District (1919–1979). Second Edition, Revised and Enlarged. Kiev, Publishing House of Political Literature of Ukraine, 1979
- Mikhail Meltyukhov. Soviet–Polish Wars. Military–Political Confrontation (1918–1939). Part Three. September 1939. War from the West – Moscow, 2001
- Military Encyclopedic Dictionary. Moscow, Military Publishing House, 1984. Pages 45–46 (Army); Pages 46–47 (Army); Page 79 (Bessarabian–Tannenberg Cavalry Division); Page 169 (World War II, 1939–45) Page 189 (German–Polish War of 1939); Page 500 (Combined Arms Armies); Page 525 (Liberation campaigns of 1939–40); Page 763 (Ukrainian Front of 1939).
- Mikhail Meltyukhov. Stalin's Liberation Campaign. Moscow, Yauza, Eksmo, 2006. ISBN 5-699-17275-0
- Colonel General Pavel Belov. Cavalrymen on the Southern Front. Site of the Workers' and Peasants' Red Army. Library
- Andrey Grechko (1976). "Bessarabian–Tannenberg Cavalry Division". Soviet Military Encyclopedia. Vol. 2. Moscow: Military Publishing House of the Ministry of Defense of the Soviet Union. pp. 464–465.
