= Mikhail Batorsky =

Red Army Komkor (1890–1938)

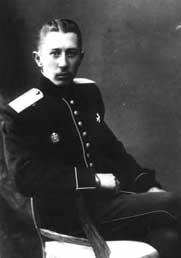
- Batorsky as a cadet before World War I
- Born: 25 January 1890; Saint Petersburg, Russian Empire
- Died: 8 February 1938 (aged 48); Kommunarka shooting ground, Moscow Oblast, Soviet Union
- Military career
- Allegiance: Russian Empire; Soviet Union
- Branch: Imperial Russian Army; Red Army
- Service years: 1909–1918; 1918–1937
- Rank: Komkor
- Commands: 4th Territorial Cavalry Corps; Leningrad Higher Cavalry School
- Conflicts: World War I; Russian Civil War; Polish–Soviet War
- Awards: Order of the Red Banner

Mikhail Alexandrovich Batorsky (Russian: Михаил Александрович Баторский; 25 January 1890 – 8 February 1938) was a Red Army Komkor.

The son of an officer and a member of the nobility, Batorsky fought in World War I as a staff officer, ending the war with the rank of lieutenant colonel. He sided with the Bolsheviks in the Russian Civil War, serving as a staff officer. During the Polish–Soviet War Batorsky served as chief of staff for the 16th Army and was decorated for his leadership. After the end of the war he became a cavalry commander and was head of a cavalry school. Batorsky was executed during the Great Purge and posthumously acquitted after Stalin's death.

== Early life and World War I ==
Batorsky was born on 25 January 1890 in Saint Petersburg, the son of a General Staff officer Aleksander Batorsky (1850–1897), later the governor of Yekaterinoslav Governorate. In 1909, he graduated from the Page Corps with honors and became a cornet on 6 August, serving in Her Majesty's Own Cuirassier Regiment. On 6 August 1913 he was promoted to lieutenant. In 1914, Batorsky graduated from the General Staff Academy in the second class, with a transfer for an additional course.

After the announcement of mobilization for World War I in August 1914, he was seconded to his unit. He fought in World War I on the Northern Front and the Western Front. On 6 October Batorsky was awarded the Order of Saint Anna 4th class. He received the Order of Saint Vladimir 4th class with Swords and Ribbon on 15 March 1915. Between 20 April 1915 and 19 March 1916, he served as the senior adjutant of headquarters of the 23rd Army Corps. From 19 March to 17 April, Batorsky was the assistant senior adjutant of the General Department of the 5th Army's Quartermaster General staff. On 17 April, he became senior adjutant of the headquarters of the Guards Cavalry Corps, a position he held until March 1917. On 14 July 1916, he was promoted to staff captain, and was later promoted to captain with seniority for 19 July 1914. On 6 December 1916, Batorsky was awarded the Order of Saint Stanislaus, 3rd class, with Swords.

The February Revolution in March 1917 overthrew the Tsar and established the Russian Provisional Government, in whose army Batorsky continued to serve. Between 12 March and 26 August, he was a staff officer for assignments at the headquarters of the same corps. Between August and November, Batorsky was senior adjutant of the operations department of the Special Army's Quartermaster General. In November, the October Revolution overthrew the Provisional Government and replaced it with Soviet Russia, after which the disintegration of the Imperial Army began to accelerate. Between November 1917 and January 1918, he was senior adjutant of the operations office department in the same army's Quartermaster General. On 25 January 1918, Batorsky transferred to become assistant chief of the Main Staff of the General Staff, with the rank of lieutenant colonel.

== Russian Civil War ==
In April 1918, Batorsky joined the Red Army.
He served mostly in staff functions, where he served under Mikhail Tukhachevsky, among others.

Between 7 June 1921 and 23 November 1921, he was Chief of Staff of the Western Front.

From October 8 1920 - Assistant Chief, then Chief of Staff of the Western Front. During this period, he served under the command of M. N. Tukhachevsky, and played a significant role in the decisive phase of the Soviet-Polish War, for which he was awarded the Order of the Red Banner. From the order of the Revolutionary Military Council of the Republic No. 343 of 12 December 1921:

"Comrade Mikhail Aleksandrovich Batorsky is awarded the Order of the Red Banner... for the fact that, as Chief of Staff of the 16th Army, he skillfully developed a plan for the preparation and execution of the upcoming operation to force the Berezina River and the further offensive movement of the army, which was crowned with complete success. During the offensive of the 16th Army on the way to Warsaw, Batorsky, in fact being the direct assistant to the army commander, brilliantly coped with the difficult and responsible work of organizing and streamlining the rear and communications, despite the lack of roads and the difficult conditions for their repair. In parallel with this, Batorsky completely bore the burden of operational work, developing his own ideas and projects for the army command, which always responded to the situation, and then selflessly implementing them. During the difficult period of the 16th Army's retreat from the walls of Warsaw and beyond the Bug (August - September 1920), due to the measures taken in advance and the personal energy of Batorsky, full mutual communication was ensured, which gave the army command the opportunity to organize the defense of Volkovysk and Pruzhany, on the line of which the army fought for a month, fighting off the advancing enemy".

== Postwar career ==
On 2 December 1921, Batorsky was appointed head of the Higher Cavalry School of the Red Army in Petrograd. From June 1924 he served as assistant to the head of the Higher Cavalry School of the Red Army. In his place, Vitaly Primakov was appointed head of the Higher School. From that time on, he joined Primakov's group in the command of the Red Army.

On 9 October 1924, by Order of the Revolutionary Military Council of the USSR No. 1265, the Higher Cavalry School was renamed the Cavalry Courses for the Advanced Training of Command Personnel (KKUKS) of the Red Army. In early 1925, Batorsky took the post of head of the Cavalry Courses for the Advanced Training of Command Personnel, replacing Primakov.

In 1925, the Courses were transferred to Novocherkassk. On the initiative of Batorsky, a hippophysiological laboratory was created at the KKUKS. In the 1920s, several works by Batorsky on horse dressage were published. Thus, in 1923, the military-scientific society of the Higher Cavalry School of the Red Army published a manual by Batorsky, "Thoughts on the Methods of Riding and Dressage". In 1925, another of his works, "Cavalry Service," was published in Moscow.

From 1925 to 1929, Batorsky held staff and command positions in the Red Army cavalry. From 1925 to 1928, he was the chief of staff of the 1st Cavalry Corps of the Red Cossacks. From January 1928 to October 1929, he was the commander of the newly created 4th Cavalry Corps in Rostov-on-Don.

In 1929, he graduated from the Advanced Training Courses for Senior Command Personnel at the Frunze Military Academy. In October 1929, he returned to the post of Chief of the Red Army Command and Control Command, which he held until June 1936, when he was removed from this post and reassigned as assistant to the head of the Department of Tactics of Higher Formations of the Academy of the General Staff of the Red Army (on cavalry issues). On 20 November, 1935, Batorsky was awarded the title of corps commander.

== Arrest, execution and rehabilitation ==
Batorsky was arrested on 17 July 1937 on charges of espionage. His name appears on the "Moscow-Center" list of persons designated for trial by the Supreme Court of the USSR under the 1st category, signed by Stalin, Voroshilov, Molotov and Kaganovich on 3 February 1938. He was convicted by the Supreme Court of the USSR on 7 February 1938 and shot the following day. He was buried in the Kommunarka shooting ground.

Georgy Zhukov later wrote about Batorsky:

In the summer of 1925, we were mainly engaged in field tactical training, which took place under the direct supervision of the head of the courses, Mikhail Aleksandrovich Batorsky. He passed on a great deal of knowledge and experience to us. It is with pain in our hearts that we regret that he too did not escape a difficult fate. In 1937, he was slandered and died tragically.

Batorsky was rehabilitated on 24 August 1957.
