= Mikhail Konstantinov =

Soviet Army colonel general and a Hero of the Soviet Union

Mikhail Petrovich Konstantinov
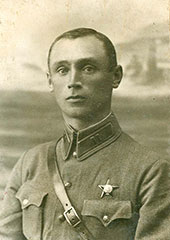
- Major Konstantinov in the late 1930s
- Born: 4 November [O.S. 22 October] 1900; Usman, Usmansky Uyezd, Tambov Governorate, Russian Empire
- Died: 30 May 1990 (aged 89) Leningrad, Soviet Union
- Buried: Bogoslovskoe Cemetery
- Allegiance: Russian SFSR; Soviet Union
- Branch: Red Army (later Soviet Army)
- Service years: 1919–1964
- Rank: Colonel general
- Commands: 20th Mountain Cavalry Division; 18th Mountain Cavalry Division; 6th Cavalry Division; 19th Cavalry Corps; 7th Guards Cavalry Corps; Northern Group of Forces
- Conflicts: Russian Civil War; Basmachi revolt; World War II
- Awards: Hero of the Soviet Union; Order of Lenin (4); Order of the Red Banner (3); Order of Suvorov, 2nd class; Order of the Patriotic War, 1st class; Order of the Red Star (3)

Mikhail Petrovich Konstantinov (Russian: Михаил Петрович Константинов; 4 November [O.S. 22 October] 1900 – 30 May 1990) was a Soviet Army colonel general and a Hero of the Soviet Union.

Konstantinov joined the Red Army during the Russian Civil War, becoming a junior commander at cavalry schools. A variety of positions at cavalry schools followed during the 1920s before Konstantinov served in command and staff positions with cavalry units in Central Asia in the 1930s. At the outbreak of Operation Barbarossa, he commanded a cavalry division in Belarus. Konstantinov's division was destroyed and he was severely wounded, fighting with partisans after he recovered. Flown back to Soviet lines in late 1942, he became commander of the 7th Guards Cavalry Corps in October 1943, which he led for the rest of the war. Made a Hero of the Soviet Union for his leadership of the corps during the Vistula–Oder Offensive, Konstantinov continued in command of the corps after the end of the war. Postwar, he commanded the Northern Group of Forces and ended his career as first deputy commander of the Leningrad Military District in the early 1960s.

== Early life, Russian Civil War, and interwar period ==
Konstantinov was born on 4 November 1900 in Usman, Tambov Governorate. The son of an official, he graduated from a realschule and worked as a ledger clerk at the uyezd food committee in Usman. During the Russian Civil War, Konstantinov joined the Red Army in May 1919 and was sent as a Red Army man to the Borisoglebsk Cavalry Courses, and in July was enrolled as a student of the courses. After graduation, Konstantinov became a platoon commander at the courses in February 1920, fighting with consolidated cadet detachments on the Southern and Turkestan Fronts. In 1922 the courses were relocated to Orenburg and renamed the 3rd Orenburg Cavalry School. At the school in the same year, Konstantinov passed an external examination for the course of a secondary military school. With the school, he served as a platoon commander, assistant squadron commander and squadron commander.

After the school was disbanded in late 1923, Konstantinov transferred to the VTsIK of the Kazakh Republic Kazakh Combined Military School. In October 1924 he was appointed an instructor of the 2nd rank at the Kyrgyz section of the school, and from July 1925 temporarily served as a squadron commander there. Between October 1925 and September 1926 Konstantinov studied at the Cavalry Officers Improvement Course (KUKS) in Novocherkassk, and upon graduation returned to his previous position. A month later, in October 1926, the school was disbanded, and Konstantinov became assistant chief of staff of the 8th Turkestan Cavalry Division of the Volga Military District. He subsequently served with the 47th Cavalry Regiment of the division as a squadron commander and assistant chief and acting regimental chief of staff. Konstantinov became a member of the Communist Party of the Soviet Union in 1929.

Konstantinov was transferred to the 7th Turkestan Cavalry Brigade of the Central Asian Military District in Kulyab in November 1930, becoming chief of the regimental school of the 80th Turkestan Cavalry Regiment of the brigade. With this unit, he fought in against the Basmachi of Ibrahim Bek between April and May 1931. Again transferred to the 79th Cavalry Regiment of the brigade to serve as its chief of staff in February 1932, Konstantinov became acting regimental commander in April. The regiment, based at Kattakurgan, was transferred to the Separate Consolidated Uzbek Brigade in May, which was reorganized into the 6th Uzbek Mountain Cavalry Division in October.

Konstantinov commanded 7th Uzbek Mountain Cavalry Regiment of the division from September 1933, which was soon renumbered as the 41st. He again completed the Novocherkassk Cavalry Officers Improvement Course in 1935. For successes in combat training of the regiment, he was awarded the Order of the Red Star in 1936, and that year received the rank of major on 29 January 1936. Appointed assistant commander of the 20th Tajik Mountain Cavalry Division of the Central Asian Military District on 19 July 1937, Konstantinov temporarily served as division commander between October 1937 and March 1938. In September 1938 he was made commander of the 18th Mountain Cavalry Division of the same district, before being sent to the Western Special Military District in March 1941 to command the 6th Cavalry Division. Konstantinov was promoted to kombrig on 31 January 1939 and was made a major general when the Red Army reintroduced generals' ranks on 4 June 1940.

== World War II ==
On 22 June 1941, when Operation Barbarossa, the German invasion of the Soviet Union, began, Konstantinov's division was part of the 6th Cavalry Corps of the 10th Army of the Western Front (the former Western Special Military District). During the Battle of Białystok–Minsk on 29 June, 15 kilometers southwest of Minsk, Konstantinov was severely wounded, and after recovering fought with a partisan detachment in Belarus. In September 1942 he was flown out to Moscow and placed at the disposal of the Central Headquarters of the Partisan Movement. From December of that year Konstantinov studied at an accelerated course at the Voroshilov Higher Military Academy, and upon completion of the course in February 1943 was appointed commander of the 19th Cavalry Corps.

Serving as deputy commander-in-chief of the Steppe Front for cavalry from July, Konstantinov took command of the 7th Guards Cavalry Corps in October. He led the corps for the rest of the war, a period in which it fought as part of the 65th, 61st, 47th, and 69th Armies of the Belorussian, 1st and 2nd Belorussian Fronts in the Gomel–Rechitsa, Polesskoe, Belorussian, Vistula–Oder, East Pomeranian, and Berlin Offensives. He was promoted to lieutenant general on 26 July 1944. For "courage, heroism, and timely fulfillment of front objectives" during the capture of Łódź and the defeat of German troops in the area of Radom, Tomaszów, and Łódź in the January 1945 Vistula–Oder Offensive, Konstantinov received the title Hero of the Soviet Union and was awarded the Order of Lenin on 6 April 1945.

== Postwar ==
After the end of the war, in December 1945, Konstantinov was placed at the disposal of the commander-in-chief of the Red Army cavalry before being sent to take the Higher Academic Course at the Voroshilov Higher Military Academy in May 1946. After completing the course in May 1947, he was appointed chief of the 2nd section of the Ground Forces Directorate of Combat Training Planning. From July 1948 he served as chief of the 2nd course of the special faculty of the Frunze Military Academy. Konstantinov became assistant commander-in-chief of the Northern Group of Forces in July 1951, succeeding to command of the group a year later. He transferred to become first deputy commander-in-chief of the Leningrad Military District in April 1955, and in August 1958 he became a member of the district military council. Promoted to colonel general on 18 February 1958, Konstantinov retired on 8 July 1964 due to ill health. He died in Leningrad on 30 May 1990, and was buried at the Bogoslovskoe Cemetery.

== Awards and honors ==
- Hero of the Soviet Union
- Order of Lenin (4)
- Order of the Red Banner (3)
- Order of Suvorov, 2nd class
- Order of the Patriotic War, 1st class
- Order of the Red Star (3)
