= Leonid Veyner =

Soviet general

Leonid Jakovlevich Veyner
- Born: 17 March 1897; Horlivka, Russian Empire
- Died: 26 November 1937 Mariupol, Soviet Union
- Allegiance: Russian Empire; Soviet Union
- Branch: Imperial Russian Army; Soviet Red Army
- Service years: 1915–1917 (Russian Empire); 1918–1937 (Soviet Union)
- Rank: Komkor
- Commands: 6th Cavalry Division
- Conflicts: World War I Russian Civil War

Leonid Jakovlevich Veyner (17 March 1897 – 26 November 1937) was a Soviet general, born in Horlivka, who was given the rank of Komkor on 21 November 1935. He served in the Imperial Russian Army in World War I and in the Soviet Red Army in the Russian Civil War. He was a recipient of the Order of Lenin, the Order of the Red Banner and the Order of the Red Star (1934). During the Great Purge, he was arrested on 15 August 1937 and later executed in Mariupol. After the death of Joseph Stalin, he was rehabilitated.

== Biography ==
Leonid Veyner was born in Gorlovka in the family of the tailor at the 1897 mine. He had an older brother, Mark. In 1915, during the strike, he was arrested and belonged to the army. In 1917, he finished serving in the old Army as a junior non-commissioned officer.

In November 1917, he formed the Guard Cavalry squad. During the Civil War, he was commander of the Partisan Krasnogvardeisky squad, commander of the Lugano Cavalry Regiment of the Communist Brigade of the 10th Army, Kamyshanskoj Rifle Brigade, 1st Donetsk Special Brigade, Special Cavalry Brigade of the 1st Mounted Army, 132nd Plastunskoj Brigade, and the 60th Rifle Brigade. He participated in the fight against Polish troops in Ukraine in 1920.

In recognition of his successes in 1919 and 1920, he was twice awarded the Order of the Red Banner (1921, 1923). After the civil war, he graduated from a military academy. In 1934, he was awarded the Order of the Red Star. He was Military Adviser to Glavkome MDN from 1936 to August 1937. In 1936, he was awarded the "Polar Star" order of Mongol for defeating the Japanese at Lake Buir-Nuur. In early 1937, he was awarded the Order of Lenin.

=== Repression ===
Veyner was arrested on 15 August 1937, sentenced to capital punishment, and thereby executed on 26 November 1937. He was rehabilitated, posthumously, on 14 May 1955.

=== Family ===
Veyner's older brother, Mark Veyner, also working in the fifth mine, was elected as a member of the Executive Board of the working deputies in the Gorlovsko-Shherbinovskom district in 1917. From October 1917 to March 1918, he was a military commander of the Nikitovka station.

== Awards ==
- Order of Lenin (1937)
- Order of the Red Banner (twice, in 1921 and 1923)
- Order of the Red Star (1934)
- Order of the Polar Star (Mongolia, 1936)

== Bibliography ==
- Shevchenko I., Yakovenko P. «Горловка в именах и лицах». Издательство "Фонарь" ("Ліхтар"). Горловка – 2007.
- Cherushev, Nikolai Semyonovich; Cherushev, Yury Nikolaevich (2012). Расстрелянная элита РККА (командармы 1-го и 2-го рангов, комкоры, комдивы и им равные): 1937—1941. Биографический словарь [Executed Elite of the Red Army (Komandarms of the 1st and 2nd ranks, Komkors, Komdivs, and equivalents) 1937–1941 Biographical Dictionary] (in Russian). Moscow: Kuchkovo Pole. ISBN 9785995002178.

Military offices
Preceded by Alexander Tarnovsky-Terletsky	Commander of the 6th Cavalry Division; 1929-1933	Succeeded by Ivan Selivanov
Preceded by Semyon Timoshenko	Commander of the 3rd Cavalry Corps; 1933-1935	Succeeded by Danilo Srdić
