= 34th Tank Division =

Tank division of the Soviet military

- Active: 1941; 1957 – ca. 1992
- Country: Soviet Union
- Branch: Armor
- Part of: 8th Mechanized Corps (1941); 7th Tank Army (1957–1992)
- Garrison/HQ: Borisov
- Engagements: Battle of Brody (1941)

The 34th Tank Division was a formation of the Red Army and Soviet Ground Forces that was formed twice.

== First formation ==
The first formation was with 8th Mechanized Corps in 1941. The formation began to be formed on June 4, 1940; it was under the command of General Lieutenant Dmitry Ryabyshev.

On June 22, 1941, the corps comprised 12th Tank Division, 34th Tank Division, 7th Mechanized Division, 2nd Motorcycle Regiment, an artillery Regiment, an engineer battalion, and a signal battalion. The 34th Tank Division itself comprised the 67th and 68th Tank Regiments and the 34th Motor Rifle Regiment.

As a part of the Southwestern Front it became engaged at the beginning of Operation Barbarossa in the Battle of Brody (1941). On 25 June 1941, 12th and 34th Tank Divisions were clearing the hills south of Brody before the whole corps opened its attack later that day. "...Its 34th Tank Division and elements of the 12th Tank Division advanced northwards, cutting the main road between Dubno and Brody. This forced the 16th Panzer Division to wheel round and attack the 34th Tank Division in the area of Kozin, in order to clear the road."

On June 26, attack plans that had been under preparation for some time were upstaged by direct orders from representatives of Southwestern Front HQ, who demanded that the corps attack immediately. Thus much of the unengaged remnants of 34th Tank Division were formed into an about 9,000-strong strike group led by Brigade Commissar Popel of corps headquarters, whose attack saw some initial success. Later however the strike group was encircled and destroyed.

In July 1941 the corps command was redesignated Headquarters 38th Army, and thus the corps was disestablished.

== 16th Tank Brigade ==
On disbandment, elements of 34th Tank Division were reorganised on 15 August 1941 at Vladimir as 16th Tank Brigade. From 1941 to 1945 the brigade was a component of the following Red Army armies and fronts:

16th Tank Brigade subordination after the beginning of Operation Barbarossa
Date assigned	Army	Front (or operational group)
Oct 1941	54th	Leningrad
Feb 1942	8th	Leningrad
Apr 1942	54th	Leningrad
Jul 1942	54th	Volkhov Group of Forces (Russian: Волховская группа войск)
Oct 1942	8th	Volkhov
Jan 1943	2nd Shock	Volkhov
Apr 1943	-	Volkhov
Oct 1943	59th	Volkhov
Apr 1944	-	Leningrad
Jul 1944	-	3rd Baltic
Oct 1944	67th	3rd Baltic
Jan 1945	Belorussian Military District	RVGK (Stavka reserve)
Apr 1945	-	1st Ukrainian

In early February 1945 the brigade was encamped in the area of Babruysk, Mogilev Region. It received T-34/85 tanks from factories at Nizhny Tagil and Gorki on 1–3 February 1945, and received Polish personnel supplementation. On 5 February 1945 the brigade was bodily transferred from the Red Army to the Polish Armed Forces in the East (16 Dnowsko-Łużycka Brygada Pancerna). That day the Supreme Commander of the Polish Army, Lt. Gen. Michal Rola-Zymierski, issued Order No. 26/Org. including within the Soviet part of the Polish Army the 16th Tank Brigade, and assigning it to the commander of the 2nd Army. The basis for issuing the order was order No. 302010 of the Headquarters, Supreme Commander of the Red Army of 3 October 1944.

16th Tank Brigade was organized on the basis of war-time Soviet armored brigade Table of Organization and Equipment No. 010/500 - 010/506 numbering 1354 soldiers. The units of the brigade were to comprise the following:

- Brigade headquarters, No. 010/500 - 54 soldiers,
- Three battalions of tanks, No. 010/501 - 148 soldiers,
- A motorised rifle battalion No. 010/502 - 507 soldiers,
- An anti-aircraft machine-gun company No. 010/503 - 48 soldiers,

On 23 February 1945 soldiers took the oath.

On February 26, as the 2nd Army redeployed, the brigade was ordered to move to the Kryza area in Western Pomerania. It was transported by rail, unloaded at the station Paczkowo and deployed in the Siedlisk area. Then it regrouped to march Sagittarius Krajenskie route by Wielen and Drezdenko. March 20 was ordered to march toward Wrocław. It departed March 29 from the station at Stare Kurowo to Oleśniczki. On April 5 the brigade, along with the entire Second Army became part of the outer blockading force around Wrocław.

That day, the brigade had 1,312 soldiers, including 250 officers, 559 NCOs and 503 ranking soldiers. Brigade equipment included 438 rifles and 528 pistols, 22 hand machine guns, four heavy machine guns, 9 antiaircraft machine guns, four 76.2 mm guns, 18 rifle, 83 vehicles and 65 T-34/85 tanks.

In preparation for the Berlin offensive the brigade was moved to the Neisse forest area. Staff officers made a reconnaissance of the brigade's approach routes and probable future enemy counterattack directions in the Rothenburg area. On April 15, in accordance with orders from the Second Army, the brigade marched out of its starting positions. After breaking through the Neisse, on the morning on April 17 the brigade reached the eastern shore of the river Weisser Schöps (Bely Šepc) and then it forced the region Uhsmannsdorf Spreehammer Nieder. On April 19 Klitten and Nieder Prauske fell in succession and the brigade reached the river Spree in the evening. It forced the river on 21 April, taking Lieske and Neudorf. On April 22 the brigade suffered huge losses in men and equipment. It took up defensive positions in the Klitten region. May 1 concentrated in the region of thick Ostfeld (Mortka), and the next day in Friedersdorf, where it regrouped from 1 to 4 May, rebuilding combat capability.

== Second formation ==
The second formation ('Днепровская ордена Суворова') was a division of the Soviet Ground Forces from 1957 to the early 1990s. It descended from the 10th Tank Corps, a Soviet tank corps of the Red Army during World War II.

The 10th Tank Corps was part of Steppe Front for the Battle of Kursk. 10th Tank Corps was subsequently assigned to the 5th Guards Tank Army, but by April 1945 during the Battle of Berlin, the 10th Tank Corps was part of the Reserve of the Supreme High Command (RVGK). It comprised the 178th, 183rd, and 186th Tank Brigades, and the 11th Motor Rifle Brigade.

It should not be confused with the 30th Tank Corps, which became the 10th Guards Tanks Corps, and later the 10th Guards Uralsko-Lvovskaya Tank Division.

On 6 July 1945 it became 10th Tank Division at Lodz with the 65th Army. In May 1948, the division moved to Borisov. In 1957, it became the 34th Heavy Tank Division. In May 1965, the division became a regular tank division. 34th Tank Division was in the Belorussian Military District for many years, part of 7th Tank Army. In 1988 divisional headquarters was at Borisov and the division comprised the 38th Guards, 183rd, and 186th Tank Regiments, the 26th Motor Rifle Regiment (BMPs), the 409th Self-Propelled Artillery Regiment, and the 1138th Anti-Aircraft Rocket Regiment. On 20 March 1992, the division was taken over by the Armed Forces of Belarus.

It appears to have become the 34th Weapons and Equipment Storage Base, part of the North Western Operational Command.
