= Vasily Terentev =

Soviet Military Leader

Vasily Grigorevich Terentev
- Born: March 3, 1899; Ardon Village, Terek Oblast, Russian Empire
- Died: January 26, 1957 (aged 57); Moscow, Union of Soviet Socialist Republics
- Military career
- Allegiance: Russian Empire; Union of Soviet Socialist Republics
- Branch: Cavalry; Intelligence Directorate of the Workers' and Peasants' Red Army; Infantry
- Service years: 1915–1947; 1953–1956
- Rank: Lieutenant General
- Commands: 3rd Cavalry Division; 5th Cavalry Division; 12th Infantry Division; 307th Infantry Division; 108th Infantry Division; 326th Infantry Division; 70th Rifle Corps
- Conflicts: World War I; Russian Civil War; World War II; Eastern Front
- Awards: Orders: Order of Lenin; Order of the Red Banner; Order of Bogdan Khmelnitsky; Order of Suvorov; Order of Kutuzov Medals: Medal "For the Defence of Moscow"; Medal "For Victory over Germany in the Great Patriotic War of 1941–1945"; Medal "For the Capture of Königsberg"; Jubilee Medal "20 Years of the Workers' and Peasants' Red Army"; Jubilee Medal "30 Years of the Soviet Army and Navy"; Medal "In Memory of the 800th Anniversary of Moscow"; Orders of Foreign Countries: Virtuti Militari; Order of the Cross of Grunwald; Medals of Foreign Countries: Medal "For the Oder, Neisse and the Baltic"; Medal "For Warsaw, 1939–1945"; Medal of Victory and Freedom

Vasily Grigorevich Terentev (March 3, 1899 – January 26, 1957) was a Soviet military leader, Lieutenant general (November 2, 1944).

== Initial biography ==
Vasily Grigorevich Terentev was born on March 3, 1899, in the village of Ardon.

== Military service ==
=== First World War and Civil War ===
In February 1915, he was drafted into the ranks of the Russian Imperial Army and sent as a private to the Kars Fortress Military Telegraph Office, then served in the 5th Caucasian Border Regiment, with which he took part in hostilities on the Caucasian Front. Having been wounded, he was treated in a military hospital in Tiflis. After recovery, from May 1917 he served in the 268th Infantry Reserve Regiment, stationed in the city of Erivan. In the same month, he was demobilized from the army with the rank of junior non–commissioned officer.

In December 1917, Terentev joined the Mineralnye Vody Red Guard Detachment as a fighter, within which he was soon appointed commander of a platoon of mounted reconnaissance officers. He took part in military operations to suppress the anti–Soviet rebellion under the leadership of generals Alexey Kaledin and Mitrofan Bogaevsky in the Don Oblast.

In April 1918, he was drafted into the ranks of the Workers' and Peasants' Red Army, after which he took part in hostilities on the Southern Front (from October of the same year – as part of the 11th Army) against the Terek Cossacks, as well as troops under the command of generals Andrey Shkuro, Konstantin Mamontov and Anton Denikin. He served as commander of the Kabardian Cavalry Divizion of the Svyatoy Krest Cavalry Division, commander of a separate squadron of the Mineralnye Vody Detachment of the 11th Army.

In October 1918, Terentev was appointed to the post of commander of the 11th Cavalry Regiment, in December – to the post of platoon commander of the 37th Cavalry Regiment (7th Cavalry Division), and in September 1919 – divizion commander of the 1st Taman Cavalry Regiment. In the same year he graduated from the 5th Oryol School, and also joined the ranks of the Russian Communist Party (Bolsheviks).

Since June 1920, as part of the 11th Army, he served as commander of the 1st Separate Taman Cavalry Brigade, commander of the 6th Cavalry Regiment (1st Caucasian Cavalry Division) and 30th Cavalry Regiment (5th Kuban Cavalry Division), and from January 1921 – as commander of the 3rd Cavalry Brigade. He took part in hostilities against troops under the command of General Pyotr Vrangel and Nestor Makhno in Ukraine.

By order of the Revolutionary Military Council of the Republic No. 116 of 1922, for distinction in battles, Vasily Terentev was awarded the Order of the Red Banner and a personalized weapon with the inscription "For Valor", which is currently on display at the Museum of Local History of North Ossetia.

=== Interwar Time ===
In March 1921, he was sent to study at the Higher Cavalry School of the Workers' and Peasants' Red Army in Leningrad, after which in October 1923 he was sent to the 7th Samara Cavalry Division, where he served together with Georgy Zhukov. He was successively appointed to the positions of squadron commander of the 38th Cavalry Regiment, assistant chief and chief of staff of the 37th Cavalry Regiment, and divizion commander of the 1st Cavalry Regiment. In October 1926, he was appointed commander and political leader of the cavalry squadron of the 2nd Rifle Division.

In September 1929, Terentev was sent to study at the Oriental Faculty of the Mikhail Frunze Military Academy, after which, in April 1933, he was appointed commander–head of the Advanced Training Courses for the Commanding Staff of Intelligence at the Intelligence Directorate of the General Staff of the Workers' and Peasants' Red Army, in September 1934 – head of the department of the 5th Department of the Intelligence Directorate of the General Staff of the Workers' and Peasants' Red Army, and in March 1936 – to the position of head and commissioner of the Advanced Training Courses for the Commanding Staff of Intelligence and Military Translator Courses at the Intelligence Directorate of the General Staff of the Workers' and Peasants' Red Army.

From September 1938, he served as commander of the 3rd Cavalry Division as part of the 2nd Cavalry Corps (Kiev Military District), in February 1939 – as commander of the 5th Cavalry Division (2nd Cavalry Corps, Kiev Military District), and in September – to the position of teacher of general tactics at the Mikhail Frunze Military Academy. In December of the same year he was sent to study at the Academy of the General Staff of the Workers' and Peasants' Red Army, from which he graduated in 1941.

=== Great Patriotic War ===
In July 1941, Vasily Terentev was appointed commander of the 12th Infantry Division (Moscow Military District), then in the same month – to the post of commander of the 307th Infantry Division, which fought on the eastern bank of the Desna River south of Bryansk. In September the division was surrounded. In a memo dated November 25, 1941, compiled by Vasily Terentev addressed to the head of the Main Personnel Directorate of the People's Commissariat of Defense of the Union of Soviet Socialist Republics, he spoke about the division's combat operations:

At the end of September, during the withdrawal of units of the 13th Army on the Desna River, I, with the 307th Infantry Division entrusted to me, was surrounded in the Vitemlya, Muravi, and Sagutevo Areas. At this time, the crossings across the Desna River were blown up by our retreating units, and the enemy was already occupying the eastern bank of the river. From the encirclement I made my way to Muravi and transported a division in the same area. Since there were no crossings across the Desna and there was no way to build one on my own, I transported the division on primitive rafts, destroying the material (7 guns, 4 cars and 22 trucks, about 90 carts). After seven or eight days, I was suspended from the post of division commander for the loss of material.

After leaving the encirclement, from September Terentev was at the disposal of the Military Council of the Bryansk Front, and from November – at the disposal of the Main Personnel Directorate of the People's Commissariat of Defense of the Union of Soviet Socialist Republics.

In December 1941, he was appointed head of the Combat Training Department of the Headquarters of the 20th Army, newly formed by order of Iosif Stalin on November 30, 1941, the command of which was taken by Major General Andrey Vlasov.

In March 1942, he was appointed commander of the 108th Infantry Division of the 5th Army, which took part in hostilities in the Gzhatsk Region during the Rzhev–Vyazma Offensive Operation.

From July 1942, he served as chief of staff of the 16th Army.

Before joining the 16th, Vasily Grigorevich Terentev commanded successively several rifle divisions on the Western and Bryansk Fronts, at the very beginning of the forty–third he left us for the same position in the 326th Division, and at the end of the war he became the commander of the 70th Rifle Corps. General Terentev, due to his character and work experience, was not a staff employee. He was, rather, a very good deputy in command, and willingly and often went to the troops.

— Ivan Bagramyan, «This is How We Went to Victory» – Moscow: Military Publishing House of the Ministry of Defense of the Union of Soviet Socialist Republics, 1977 – Pages 146–147

In February 1943, he was appointed commander of the 326th Infantry Division, which fought in the Zhizdra Direction, and then during the Battle of Kursk northeast of the city of Lyudinovo.

In August 1943, he was appointed commander of the 70th Rifle Corps, which soon took part in the Smolensk Offensive Operation, and from January to April 1944 – in defensive operations on the Pronya River. Since May 1944, the corps participated in the Belorussian, East Prussian, East Pomeranian and Berlin Offensive Operations, as well as in the liberation of the cities of Mogilyov, Theerwisch, Czersk, Berent, Karthaus, Danzig, Schwedt, Angermünde, Templin, Fürstenberg and Gransee.

The Commander of the 49th Army, Lieutenant General Ivan Grishin, certifying Vasily Terentev at the end of the war, wrote:

The corps under the command of Comrade Terentev successfully completed the tasks assigned to it to break through the strong fortified German defense line on the Pronya River. With a rapid offensive, the corps successfully crossed the Dnepr River and captured the city of Mogilyov. The 70th Rifle Corps successfully broke through the German defenses on the Svisloch River, captured an important center of German defense, the town of Kuznitsa, and in subsequent operations the corps occupied a leading role in the army. In operational–tactical terms, Comrade Terentev is sufficiently prepared. He has sufficient experience both in training troops and in the operation itself. A cultured, seasoned general.

Lieutenant General Vasily Terentev was mentioned 15 times in the gratitude orders of the Supreme Commander–in–Chief.

=== Post–War Career ===
In June 1945, Terentev was appointed to a position for special assignments under the Commander–in–Chief of the Group of Soviet Occupation Forces in Germany, in May 1946 – for special assignments under the Commander–in–Chief of the Ground Forces, Marshal of the Soviet Union Georgy Zhukov, and in September of the same year – to the position of Head of the Course of the Main Faculty of the Mikhail Frunze Military Academy.

On November 1, 1947, Lieutenant General Vasily Terentev was arrested in the "Trophy Case", after which he was sent to Lefortovo Prison, where he shared a cell with David Gofshteyn.

On November 1, 1951, he was sentenced to 25 years by the Military Collegium of the Supreme Court of the Union of Soviet Socialist Republics. Was in Kengir (3rd Camp Department of the Steppe Camp). In 1953, after the death of Iosif Stalin and the arrest of Lavrenty Beriya, he was released from prison and rehabilitated. In August of the same year, he was again assigned to the cadres of the Soviet Army and placed at the disposal of the Main Personnel Directorate.

In February 1954, he was appointed Head of the Military Department of the Moscow Law Institute. In May of the same year, by order of the Minister of Defense, Vasily Terentev's length of service in the Soviet Army for the period from March 1947 to August 1953 was preserved.

Lieutenant General Vasily Terentev retired in January 1956. Died on January 26, 1957, in Moscow. He was buried at the Novodeviche Cemetery (5th Section, 1st Row, 2nd place).

== Awards ==
- Order of Lenin (February 21, 1945);
- Four Orders of the Red Banner (1922; May 11, 1943; November 3, 1944; November 5, 1954);
- Order of Bogdan Khmelnitsky, 1st Class (April 10, 1945);
- Order of Suvorov, 2nd Class (July 21, 1944);
- Order of Kutuzov, 2nd Class (September 28, 1943);
- Medals.

Foreign awards

- Knight of the Knightly Order "Virtuti Militari" (Poland) (1945);
- Order of the Cross of Grunwald, II Degree (Poland) (1945);
- Medal "For Warsaw, 1939–1945" (Poland) (1945);
- Medal "For the Oder, Neisse and the Baltic" (Poland) (1945);
- Medal of Victory and Freedom (Poland) (1945).

Gratitude declared in the Orders of the Supreme Commander–in–Chief

- For crossing the Pronya River and breaking through enemy defenses. June 25, 1944. No. 117;
- For crossing the Dnepr River and for the liberation of the large regional center of Belorussiya, the city of Mogilyov, an operationally important center of German Defense in the Minsk Direction, as well as for the capture of the cities of Shklov and Bykhov. June 28, 1944. No. 122;
- For participation in the battles to liberate the city and fortress of Osovets, a powerful fortified German Defense Area on the Bobr River, covering the approaches to the borders of East Prussia. August 14, 1944. No. 166;
- For the liberation of the city and fortress of Ostrolenka, an important stronghold of the German Defense on the Narev River. September 6, 1944. No. 184;
- For the liberation of the city and fortress of Lomzha, an important stronghold of the German Defense on the Narev River. September 13, 1944. No. 186;
- For the capture of the cities of East Prussia Willenberg, Ortelsburg, Mohrungen, Saalfeld and Freystadt – important communications hubs and strong strongholds of German Defense. January 23, 1945. No. 246;
- For the capture of the city of Czersk – an important communications hub and a strong stronghold of the German Defense in the northwestern part of Poland. February 21, 1945. No. 283;
- For the capture of the cities of Bütow and Berent – important junctions of railways and highways and strong strongholds of German Defense on the roads to Danzig. March 8, 1945. No. 296;
- For the capture of important railway and highway junctions – the cities of Lauenburg and Karthaus. March 10, 1945. No. 298;
- For the capture of the city and fortress of Danzig – the most important port and first–class naval base of the Germans on the Baltic Sea. March 30, 1945. No. 319;
- For the capture of the cities of Prenzlau and Angermünde – important strongholds of the German Defense in Western Pomerania. April 27, 1945. No. 348;
- For the capture of the cities of Eggesin, Torgelow, Pasewalk, Strasburg, Templin – important strongholds of the German Defense in Western Pomerania. April 28, 1945. No. 350;
- For the capture of the cities of Greifswald, Treptow, Neustrelitz, Fürstenberg, Gransee – important road junctions in the northwestern part of Pomerania and Mecklenburg. April 30, 1945. No. 352;
- For the capture of the cities of Stralsund, Grimmen, Demmin, Malchin, Waren, Wesenberg – important road junctions and strong strongholds of the German Defense. May 1, 1945. No. 354;
- For the capture of the cities of Barth, Bad Doberan, Neubukow, Warin, Wittenberge and for the connection on the Wismar–Wittenberge Line with the British Troops allied to us. May 3, 1945. No. 360.

== Military ranks ==
- Major general (December 20, 1942);
- Lieutenant general (November 2, 1944).

== Gallery ==
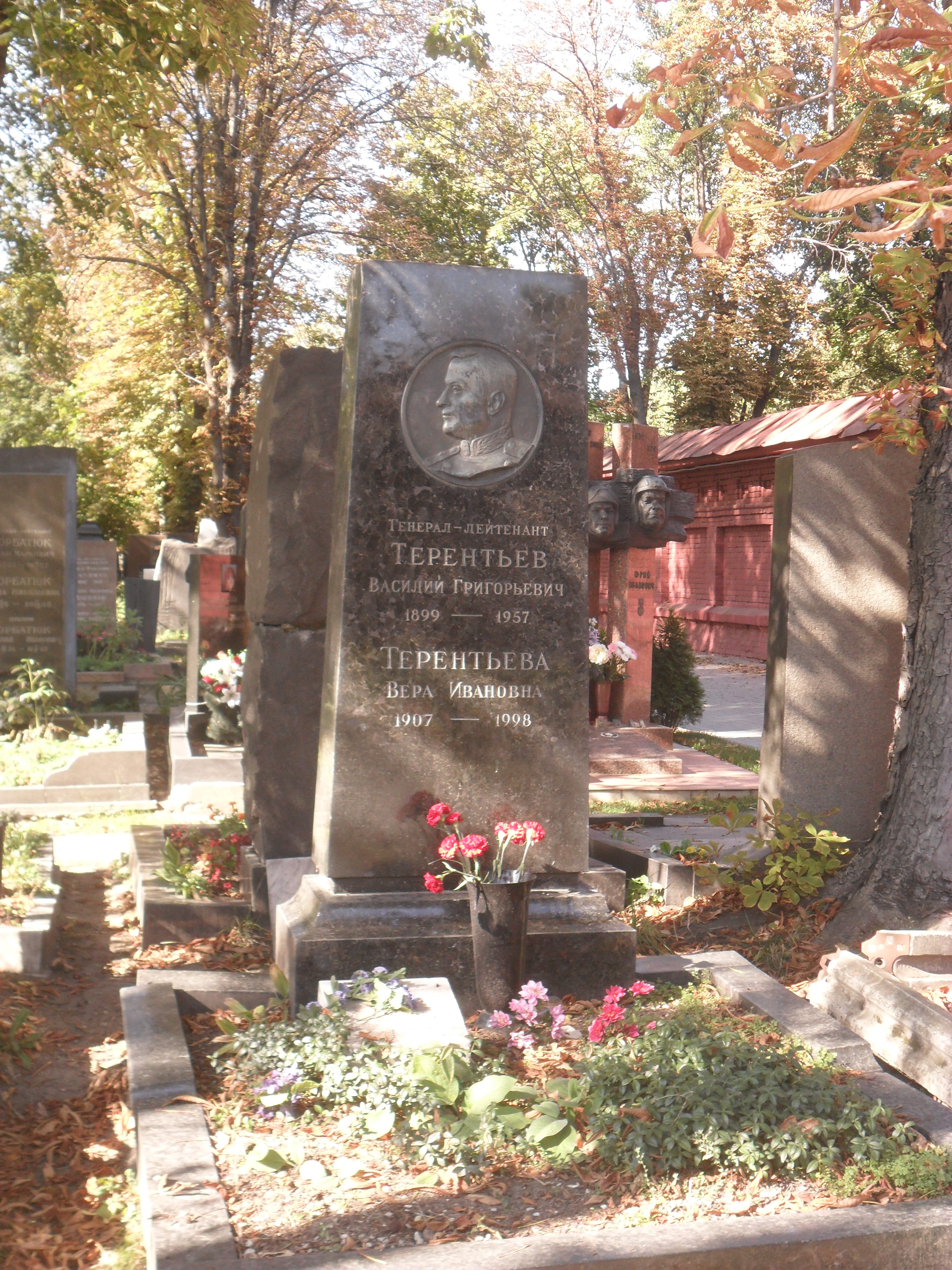
The grave of Vasily Terentev at the Novodeviche Cemetery in Moscow

== Sources ==
- Team of Authors. Great Patriotic War: Corps Commanders. Military Biographical Dictionary / Under the General Editorship of Mikhail Vozhakin – Moscow; Zhukovsky: Kuchkovo Field, 2006 – Volume 1 – Pages 557–559 – ISBN 5-901679-08-3
- Team of Authors. Great Patriotic War: Division Commanders. Military Biographical Dictionary. Commanders of Rifle, Mountain Rifle Divisions, Crimean, Polar, Petrozavodsk Divisions, Reboly Divisions, Fighter Divisions (Pivovarov – Yatsun) – Moscow: Kuchkovo Pole, 2014 – Volume 5 – Pages 599–601 – 1500 Copies – ISBN 978-5-9950-0457-8
- Poplavsky, Stanislav (1974). Comrades in the Fight (2nd, Corrected and Supplemented ed.). Moscow: Military Publishing House of the Ministry of Defense of the Union of Soviet Socialist Republics.
