= Ivan Kosogov =

Soviet komkor (corps commander)

Ivan Dmitriyevich Kosogov
- Born: 1891 Oryol Governorate, Russian Empire
- Died: 1 August 1938 (aged 46–47) Kommunarka shooting ground, Moscow Oblast, Soviet Union
- Allegiance: Soviet Union
- Branch: Soviet Red Army
- Commands: 4th Cavalry Corps
- Battles / wars: Russian Civil War

Ivan Dmitriyevich Kosogov (Russian: Иван Дмитриевич Косогов, 1891 – 1 August 1938) was a Soviet Komkor (corps commander). He fought on the side of the Bolsheviks against the White movement during the Russian Civil War. He was a recipient of the Order of the Red Banner. During the Great Purge, he was arrested in 1937 and executed the following year at the Kommunarka shooting ground.

== Bibliography ==
- Cherushev, Nikolai Semyonovich; Cherushev, Yury Nikolaevich (2012). Расстрелянная элита РККА (командармы 1-го и 2-го рангов, комкоры, комдивы и им равные): 1937—1941. Биографический словарь [Executed Elite of the Red Army (Komandarms of the 1st and 2nd ranks, Komkors, Komdivs, and equivalents) 1937–1941 Biographical Dictionary] (in Russian). Moscow: Kuchkovo Pole. ISBN 9785995002178.

Military offices
Preceded by	Commander of the 4th Cavalry Corps; 7 February 1936 – 26 May 1937	Succeeded by Arkady Borisov
