= 6th Cavalry Division (Soviet Union) =

- Active: March 1919 – September 1941
- Country: Russian Soviet Federated Socialist Republic; Soviet Union
- Branch: Red Army
- Type: Cavalry
- Engagements: Russian Civil War; Polish–Soviet War; Soviet invasion of Poland; World War II
- Decorations: Order of Lenin; Order of the Red Banner; Order of the Red Star
- Battle honours: Kuban-Terek Cossack; Chongar; named for S.M. Budyonny

Commanders
- Notable commanders: Semyon Timoshenko; Oka Gorodovikov; Anton Lopatin

The 6th Cavalry Division was a cavalry division of the Red Army from the Russian Civil War to the beginning of World War II.

Formed in March 1919, the division became part of the famed 1st Cavalry Army in the fall of that year, and fought in the Red Army's successful counteroffensive against the Armed Forces of South Russia. After Denikin's defeat in the spring of 1920, the division and the 1st Cavalry Army were transferred northwestwards to fight in the Polish–Soviet War, where they recaptured Kiev. During the summer of 1920, the division and the army became bogged down in the Battle of Lwów, which resulted in Soviet defeat to the north in the Battle of Warsaw, and the reinforcing 1st Cavalry Army was defeated when it attempted to intervene in the latter. This began a disorganized Soviet retreat, which the army participated in. The division and its army were transferred to Crimea, where Pyotr Nikolayevich Wrangel led the remnants of the White Army. After the evacuation of remaining White forces from Crimea, the division was moved to Belarus, where it remained for the interwar period. In 1939 and 1940, the 6th Division participated in the Soviet invasion of Poland and the Soviet occupation of Lithuania. After returning to Belarus at the conclusion of the Lithuanian occupation, the division was destroyed in the June 1941 German invasion of the Soviet Union and officially disbanded in September.

== History ==
The division traced its lineage back to the 1st Stavropol Cavalry Division, formed in October 1918 from the Stavropol Cavalry Brigade, composed of Stavropol partisan cavalry. On 20 January 1919, the division was renamed the 1st Soviet Cavalry Division. After the disbandment of the Caspian-Caucasian Front, all of its cavalry units, including the division, were consolidated into a single cavalry division by an order dated 18 March 1919. On 26 March, the division was redesignated the 6th Cavalry Division. The division became part of the 10th Army and was commanded by Iosif Apanasenko. In June it became part of Semyon Budyonny's Cavalry Corps of the 10th Army.

Combat Path of the 6th Divison

== Commanders ==
The following officers commanded the division.

- Savely Negovora (9 January–26 March 1919)
- Iosif Apanasenko (26 March–24 June 1919)
- Semyonov (24 June–14 July 1919)
- Boris Solovyov (acting; 14–15 July 1919)
- Iosif Apanasenko (15–17 July 1919)
- Alexey Polyakov (acting; 17 July–24 August 1919)
- Grigory Baturin (24 August–3 October 1919)
- Iosif Apanasenko (3 October–3 November 1919)
- Semyon Timoshenko (3 November 1919 – 5 August 1920)
- Iosif Apanasenko (5 August–12 October 1920)
- Yakov Sheko (acting; 12–27 October 1920)
- Oka Gorodovikov (27 October 1920 – May 1924)
- Alexander Tarnovsky-Terletsky (1926)
- Leonid Veyner (October 1929 – 17 August 1933)
- Ivan Selivanov (1933)
- Kombrig Dmitry Veynerkh (22 January or 22 April 1934 – Unknown)
- Colonel (promoted to Kombrig 17 February 1938) Anton Lopatin (July 1937 – September 1938)
- Kombrig (converted to Major general 4 June 1940) Pyotr Makarov (14 August 1939 – March 1941)
- Major General Mikhail Konstantinov (14 March – 19 September 1941)
