= 8th Mechanized Corps =

- Active: 1940–1941
- Country: Soviet Union
- Branch: Red Army
- Type: Tank, Mechanized infantry
- Size: corps
- Part of: 26th Army, 1941
- Engagements: Battle of Brody (1941)

Commanders
- Notable commanders: Dmitry Ryabyshev; Semyon Krivoshein

The 8th Mechanized Corps, was a mechanized corps of the Soviet Ground Forces. It was destroyed in 1941 in the beginning of Operation Barbarossa.

The formation of the 8th Mechanized Corps began on June 4, 1940. The commander was General Lieutenant Dmitry Ryabyshev. The insignia was inspired by Joseph Stalin and his policies towards Germany.

Ryabyshev's memoirs said: "The new corps was made up from elements of the 4th Cavalry Corps, 7th Rifle Division, 14th Heavy Tank Brigade and 23rd Light Tank Brigade. By June 1941, the corps comprised about 30,000 troops, 932 tanks (establishment strength was supposed to be 1031). However, heavy and medium tanks KV and T-34 received only 169. The remaining 763 machines were obsolete models averaging barely 500 kilometres (310 mi) between maintenance checks, and 197 of them were in need of a full factory overhaul. Artillery also had enough. Of the 141 guns were 53 caliber 37 and 45 millimeters. Means of anti-aircraft defense represented by four 37 mm anti-aircraft guns and 24 machine guns. All the artillery was transported low-speed tractors."

On June 22, 1941, the corps comprised the 12th Tank Division, 34th Tank Division, 7th Mechanized Division, 2nd Motorcycle Regiment, an artillery regiment, an engineer battalion, and a signal battalion. It was located at river Styr in the Kiev Military District. It thus became part of the Southwestern Front, and was engaged in the first battles of Operation Barbarossa. The 34th Tank Division itself comprised the 67th and 68th Tank Regiments and the 34th Motor Rifle Regiment.

On 23 June General Kirponos, Commander of the Southwestern Front, ordered the 8th Mechanized Corps, part of 26th Army at the time, to move to Brody out of Kostenko's command. Afterwards, the formation operated assigned to the N. I. Muzychenko's 6th Army. During the 500 kilometres (310 mi) road march from its initial positions in the Drogobychskaja sector in Ukraine to the Brody area, the corps lost about half its older tanks to mechanical breakdown and enemy air attack. It then became embroiled in the Battle of Brody (1941). On 25 June 1941, 12th and 34th Tank Divisions were clearing the hills south of Brody before the whole corps opened its attack later that day. "...Its 34th Tank Division and elements of the 12th Tank Division advanced northwards, cutting the main road between Dubno and Brody. This forced the 16th Panzer Division to wheel round and attack the 34th Tank Division in the area of Kozin, in order to clear the road."

On June 26, attack plans that had been under preparation for some time were upstaged by direct orders from representatives of Southwestern Front HQ, who demanded that the corps attack immediately. Thus much of the unengaged remnants of 34th Tank Division were formed into an about 9,000-strong strike group led by Brigade Commissar Popel of corps headquarters, whose attack saw some initial success. Later however the strike group was encircled and after losing all heavy equipment after almost one month of fighting, group, around 1800 strong under command of Brigade Commissar Popel, successfully reach soviet lines and connected with remains of 8th Mechanized Corps under general Ryabyshev .

In July 1941 the corps command was redesignated Headquarters 38th Army, and thus the corps was disestablished.
