= Timofey Shapkin =

Former Soviet corps commander (1885–1943)

- Born: March 5, 1885
- Died: March 22, 1943 (aged 58)
- Allegiance: Russian Empire; Soviet Union
- Branch: Imperial Russian Army; Soviet Red Army
- Service years: 1906–1917 (Russian Empire); 1918–1943 (Soviet Union)
- Rank: lieutenant general
- Commands: 4th Cavalry Corps
- Conflicts: World War I Russian Civil War; Polish–Soviet War; World War II

Timofey Shapkin (March 5, 1885 – March 22, 1943) was a Soviet corps commander. He served in the Imperial Russian Army during World War I before going over to the Bolsheviks. He fought in the war against Poland.

In World War II, he commanded the 4th Cavalry Corps. In March 1943, he fell seriously ill and died on March 22 in a hospital in Rostov-on-Don from a cerebral hemorrhage.

He was a recipient of the Order of the Red Banner and the Order of Kutuzov.

== Bibliography ==
- Vozhakin, Mikhail Georgievich, ed. (2006). Великая Отечественная. Комкоры. Военный биографический словарь [Great Patriotic War: Corps Commanders: Military Biographical Dictionary] (in Russian). Vol. 2. Moscow: Kuchkovo Pole. pp. 91–92. ISBN 5901679083.

Preceded by None, office created	Commander of the 4th Cavalry Corps; January 18, 1941 – March 22, 1943	Succeeded by Major General Mikhail Maleyev
