= Arkady Borisov =

Uzbekistani military personnel (1901–1942)

Arkady Borisovich Borisov
- Born: 13 May 1901; Bukhara, Russian Empire
- Died: 27 May 1942 (aged 41)
- Allegiance: Soviet Union
- Branch: Soviet Red Army
- Service years: 1919–1942
- Rank: major general
- Commands: 4th Cavalry Corps
- Conflicts: Russian Civil War; World War II

Arkady Borisovich Borisov (Russian: Аркадий Борисович Борисов; 13 May 1901 – 27 May 1942) was a Soviet corps commander. He was born in what is now Uzbekistan. He fought for the Bolsheviks against the White movement during the civil war. He was a recipient of the Order of the Red Banner. During the Great Purge, he was arrested on 10 February 1938 and imprisoned in Rostov. While he was imprisoned, his predecessor Ivan Kosogov and successor Yakov Sheko were executed. He was later released and died on 27 May 1942.

Preceded by Ivan Kosogov	Commander of the 4th Cavalry Corps; May–July 1937	Succeeded by Yakov Sheko
