= Yaponts Abadiyev =

Soviet cavalry commander (1906–1985)

Yaponts Arskievich Abadiyev
- Японц Арскиевич Абадиев; Японц Арски Абаьд-наькъан
- Born: 1906 (Note: Most sources indicate he was born in 1906, but an article with a typo from the newspaper "Serdalo" indicated he was born in 1905.); Nasyr-Kort, Nazranovskiy Okrug, Russian Empire
- Died: 1985; Nazran, Chechen-Ingush ASSR, USSR
- Military career
- Allegiance: Soviet Union
- Branch: Cavalry
- Service years: 1924–1954
- Rank: Lieutenant Colonel
- Commands: 126th Cavalry Regiment; 255th Chechen-Ingush Cavalry Regiment; 297th Cavalry Regiment; 278th Cavalry Regiment
- Conflicts: World War II
- Awards: Order of Lenin (posthumously)

Yaponts Arskievich Abadiyev (Russian: Японц Арскиевич Абадиев, Ingush: Японц Арски Абаьд-наькъан, romanized: Yaponts Arski Abäd-näqan; 1906–1985) was a Soviet cavalry regiment commander during the Second World War. At the start of the war he was positioned as the deputy commander of a tank regiment, but was soon assigned as the commander of the 126th Cavalry Regiment. He briefly served as commander of the 255th Separate Chechen-Ingush Cavalry Regiment, but soon accepted command of a regiment within the 115th Kabardian-Balkar Cavalry Division. During the war he was injured multiple times, as his division was ordered to confront the 4th Panzer Army despite their cavalrymen being no match for the tanks. Despite his long service in the Red Army, his entire family was deported in the Aardakh, and was sent to Bashkortostan to command a reserve regiment. After the war he was stationed in a variety of cities, but did not get to return to his homeland of Ingushetia until the 1980s.

== Early life ==
Abadiyev was born over a decade before the October Revolution in the Ingush village of Nasyr-Kort. Having been born during the Russo-Japanese War, he was named "Yaponts", (meaning Japanese) due to the Ingush tradition of occasionally naming children after the ethnonyms of the peoples they fought in battle. In 1924, after joining the Red Army, he was sent to cavalry school, where cadets participated in the liquidation of the kulaks. In 1930 he graduated from cavalry school and was stationed in the city of Vladikavkaz as a squadron commander. That year he was presented with an engraved Gewehr 98, after recommendation of the commander of the 28th Rifle Division, A. D. Kazitsky. He became a member of the Communist Party in 1938, in March 1939 he was appointed as the Chief of Staff of the 39th Cavalry Regiment, and in 1940 he was promoted to the position of deputy commander of the 107th Cossack Cavalry Regiment based in Armavir.

== World War II ==
In the early days of Operation Barbarossa, Abadiyev was on the front lines of the Second World War. Initially he was deputy commander of the 117th Heavy Tank Regiment based in Smolensk, which was subjected to heavy bombardments. He went on to command the 126th Cavalry Regiment of the 28th Cavalry Division in Pavlohrad.

On 16 August 1941, General Rodion Malinovsky the commander of the 6th Army, tasked Abadiyev with leading an attack to push back enemy forces in the region of Sursk-Litovsk towards the Dnieper. On August 19, his regiment was the first in the region to begin the attack. The cavalrymen destroyed two enemy companies and completely expelled enemy forces from the village. From August 20 to 23, Abadiyev managed to organize the repulsion of a tank offensive. The regiment assumed the main fire, and thus ensured the safe exit of the division from the battlefield, ensuring the success of the operation. In October 1941, he sustained a head injury but continued to remain in command of his regiment. On 5 November 1941 he was awarded the Order of the Red Banner for success in combat.

=== 255th Separate Chechen-Ingush Cavalry Regiment ===
In March 1942 he was appointed as the commander of the newly formed 255th Separate Chechen-Ingush Cavalry Regiment, but soon accepted a new position and was replaced by his chief of staff Movlid Visaitov in May.

=== 115th Kabardian-Balkar Cavalry Division ===
Abadiyev was briefly in command of the 297th Cavalry Regiment of the 115th Kabardian-Balkar Cavalry Division before he was sent to command the 278th Cavalry Regiment in July, which was within the same division. In July 1942 German troops broke through the southern part of the front, which resulted in the division engaging in defensive operations in the North Caucasus, Stalingrad, and in the heavy fighting between the Don and Volga rivers. Earlier that year in June the division had received orders to fight off the 4th German Tank Army near the village of Konstantinovsk; in the following defensive operation, the division would lose more than half of its personnel. On the evening of July 29, the division took their positions for a counterattack, but the German tanks attacked first, destroying the headquarters of Major-General Boris Pogrebov before the 115th division could launch their offensive. Nevertheless, Abadiyev and his cavalrymen fought to their last, and the German who troops broke through the defensive line did so in Tsimlyansk area, which was junctioned between the 91st and 157th Rifle Divisions. It was noted by the command of the 51st Army that the regimental commanders of the 115th Division acted bravely and showed resilience. During one engagement in the summer of 1942, Abadiyev was seriously wounded and nearly killed, but his horse saved his life and carried him off the battlefield under heavy enemy fire. The 115th Division was disbanded in October 1942 while Abadiyev was in the hospital, after having lost over two-thirds of its personnel; the survivors of unit were sent to anti-tank and reconnaissance units.

=== Disbandment of the 115th Division ===
After recovering from his injuries he attended the Frunze Military Academy and briefly taught at the Arzamas Higher Officer Staff School before being redeployed to the warfront. He participated in the Battle of Stalingrad and the fighting at the Khopyor River. For his actions in repelling attacks from German tanks he was nominated for the title Hero of the Soviet Union by Konstantin Rokossovsky, but he did not receive the title.

=== Aardakh and return ===
On 23 February 1944 his family was deported along with the entire Ingush civilian population; the Soviet government had labeled Vainakh peoples as "traitors to the motherland" and ordered the mass relocation of them to prison settlements in Central Asia. Yaponts Abadiyev was recalled from the front, but not immediately sent to a "special settlement" and was instead allowed to command a reserve regiment in Orenburg and then serve as deputy commander of the 28th Reserve Regiment in Bashkortostan. When the war officially ended he was stationed in Gorky as a battalion commander. After the war he was assigned to command construction battalions in Vladimir, Ryazan, Moscow, Berezniki, and Kuibyshev, before returning to Ingushetia in the early 1980s. He retired from the military in the 1950s with the rank of lieutenant-colonel. After his death in 1985 he was posthumously awarded the Order of Lenin, the medal of which was presented to his living relatives.

== Awards and honors ==
- Order of Lenin
- Order of the Red Banner
- Order of the Patriotic War 1st Class
- campaign and jubilee medals

There are memorial plaques bearing his name in Volgograd in a museum and Mamayev Kurgan.

== See also ==
- Movlid Visaitov
- Dasha Akayev

== Bibliography ==
- Gagiyev, Girikhan (26 March 1968). "Жизнь продолжается". Газета «Путь Ленина» (in Russian). Vol. 37, no. 808. Archived from the original on 2015-07-06.
- Visaitov, Movlid (1966). От Терека до Эльбы. Воспоминания бывшего командира гвардейского полка о боевом пути в годы Великой Отечественной войны. Grozny: Чечено-Ингушское книжное издательство.
- Grechko, A.A. (1967). Битва за Кавказ. Часть 1. Оборона. Глава 1. Бои в Донских и Кубанских степях. Moscow: Voenizdat.
- Zakhokhov, Yu. H.; Zakhov, Z. Yu. (2013). "Кабардино-балкарцы – герои битвы за Сталинград" (in Russian). Материалы международной научно-практической конференции «Архивное дело в Волгоградской области. 1923-2013 гг.». Archived from the original on 2015-10-01.
- "Ингуши в Великой Отечественной Войне" (PDF) (in Russian). 15 (118). Городская общественно-политическая газета «Голос Назрани». 8 May 2013. Archived from the original (PDF) on 2015-10-05.
- Sagov, M. Z.; Oligova, Z. I.; Malsagova, A. Kh.; Uzhakhov, A. Kh.; Pogorova A.A. (2013). Ингуши — защитники Сталинграда (in Russian). Материалы международной научно-практической конференции «Архивное дело в Волгоградской области. 1923-2013 гг.». Archived from the original on 2015-10-01.
