= Movlid Visaitov =

Soviet Chechen colonel (1914–1986)

Movlid Aleroevich Visaitov
- Мавлид Алероевич Висаитов
- Born: 13 May 1914; Nadterechnoe, Chechnya, Russian Empire
- Died: 23 May 1986 (aged 73); Grozny, Chechen-Ingush ASSR, Soviet Union
- Military career
- Allegiance: Soviet Union
- Branch: Cavalry
- Service years: 1932–1946
- Rank: Lieutenant colonel
- Commands: 255th Separate Chechen-Ingush Cavalry Regiment
- Conflicts: World War II
- Awards: Hero of the Soviet Union (1990)

Movlid Visaitov (Russian: Мавлид Алероевич Висаитов; 13 May 1914 – 23 May 1986) was a Chechen Red Army colonel and a Hero of the Soviet Union. Visaitov was commander of 255th Separate Chechen–Ingush cavalry regiment during World War II.

He was the first Soviet officer to radio-contact, meet, and shake hands with American forces under the command of General Bolling on the Elbe River, which Visaitov later joked about as "we came from Terek river to Elbe river". Both Bolling and Visaitov exchanged gifts: Visaitov gave Bolling his horse, and in return Bolling gave Visaitov a Willys MB utility vehicle. Visaitov received the Legion of Merit from US President Harry S. Truman. In 1946 Visaitov refused to participate in the plot to execute the Chechen dissident Abdurakhman Avtorkhanov who lived in Europe. He was deported to a prison settlement in the Kyrgyz SSR where many other deported Chechens and Ingush were located since 1944.

== Early life ==
Visaitov was born on 13 May 1914 in the village of Lakha-Nevre in the Terek Oblast. He graduated from seven classes in 1931 at the village school. He graduated from the Grozny Co-Operative College in 1932, and worked as a store manager. In October 1932, he was drafted into the Red Army. Visaitov's birth date was changed to 1913, and his patronymic to Aleroevich instead of Magomedovich. He served in a cavalry regiment in the North Caucasus Military District until February 1933, after which he graduated from the North Caucasus Mountain Cavalry School of Krasnodar in January 1935 before graduating from the Ordzhonikidzevskaya Infantry School in November that same year. He was then assigned to the Kiev military District where he started as a platoon commander and left with the position of squadron commander. In September 1939 he saw combat during the Soviet invasion of Poland as a captain and squadron commander in the 34th Cavalry Regiment, which was at the time part of the 3rd Cavalry Division. He remained a squadron commander in Kiev until the end of 1940, and in May 1941 he completed further training in Rostov.

== World War II ==
Not long after the launch of Operation Barbarossa Visaitov first saw combat against German forces in June 1941 as a squadron commander in the 34th Cavalry Regiment on the Southwestern Front. During the defense of Ukraine on 24 July 1941 he was wounded in the left shoulder and treated in a hospital until the end of August. After recovering he participated in the defense of Kiev as commander of a separate reconnaissance battalion of the 206th Rifle Division. On 19 September 1941 while the division was encircled near the city of Boryspil, Visaitov took command of over 200 men and managed to reunite them with troops in Donbas. He went on to take part in the defense of Rostov-on-Don before he sustained frostbite in his hand and severely injured his right leg in November 1941. He was sent to a hospital in Pyatigorsk where he remained recovering until the beginning of 1942, after which he was appointed as the chief of staff of the newly formed 255th Separate Chechen-Ingush Cavalry Regiment, which was initially placed under the command of Yaponts Abadiyev; later Abadiyev was appointed to a different position and Visaitov was made the commander of the regiment on 13 May 1942. From the very beginning of the Battle of Stalingrad the regiment saw heavy battle; on 3 August 1942 while covering the retreat of Soviet troops the regiment was engaged by the 78th Tank Corps of the Wehrmacht near Kotelnikovo. During the engagement the regiment took out four German tanks but suffered heavy losses from both German tanks and aviation-based attacks from numerically superior forces. Facing constant bombardment and high casualties, the regiment was forced to retreat, and after suffering further losses in Stalingrad the regiment was divided into two independent reconnaissance battalions for the 4th Cavalry Corps. Visaitov himself had expressed his disagreement with orders to send horsemen to fight against heavily armored German tanks, and he was punished for expressing such concerns; but members of his regiment appreciated that he did not want to lead them to a certain death. As the regiment was being dissolved, in October 1942 Visaitov was placed in command of one of the separate reconnaissance battalions, and remained in that position until January 1943, after which he was placed in charge of cavalry courses which trained junior lieutenants of the Southern Front. In September that same year he was reassigned again as an assistant inspector of cavalry, and fought in battles throughout Ukraine until he was expelled from his post into the reserve in May 1944 because he was Chechen; in February 1944 the entire Chechen nation was declared to be traitors, and the civilian population was deported to Central Asia.

Visaitov was nearly executed at the warfront after he physically attacked General Oslikovsky who publicly shamed him front of his colleagues because of his ethnicity. The general had praised him, but when he heard his surname and realized he was Chechen, he ripped an epaulet off Visaitov's uniform and declared Chechens to be traitors. Visaitov fought back with a blow to Osilikovsky's face, and Visaitov was about to be shot for attacking the general when Pavel Brikel intervened and begged Oslikovsky to spare Visaitov.

In September 1944 after protests from several Chechen servicemen of the Red Army in Moscow, Chechens including Visaitov were permitted to return to service in the Red Army. He was assigned as assistant commander of the 23rd Guards Cavalry Regiment, and in December he became commander of the 28th Guards Cavalry Regiment. He participated in the offensives of Mlavsko-Elbingskoy, East Pomeranian, and Berlin. During the Berlin operation his regiment was paired with tank and artillery units, and they broke through enemy lines in Schwedt on 27 April. As they continued to advanced they seized several towns, took out two enemy regiments, seized large amounts of enemy equipment, and liberated three concentration camps. On 2 May they reached the Elbe river, where Visaitov greeted American troops, and he was soon nominated for the title Hero of the Soviet Union. However, because he was Chechen he was only awarded the Order of Lenin at the time.

For years after the victory he was not allowed to return to his home in Chechnya, and was sent to exile in Central Asia. In 1957 he was permitted to return to Chechnya, where he worked in agriculture. He later lived in Grozny and died on 23 May 1986 at the age of 72. On 5 May 1990 he was posthumously declared a Hero of the Soviet Union, after his nomination in 1945 had been rejected because of his nationality.

== Awards ==
- Hero of the Soviet Union
- Two Orders of Lenin
- Order of the Red Banner
- Order of Suvorov
- Order of the Patriotic War 1st Class
- Order of the Red Star
- Medal "For Battle Merit"
- Legion of Merit
- campaign and jubilee medals
