= Dmitry Ryabyshev =

Soviet general (1894–1985)

Dmitry Ivanovich Ryabyshev
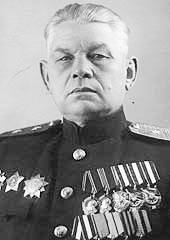
- Born: February 23, 1894; Kolotovka, Don Host Oblast, Russian Empire
- Died: November 18, 1985 (aged 91); Rostov-on-Don, Soviet Union
- Burial place: Northern Cemetery, Rostov-on-Don
- Military career
- Allegiance: Soviet Union
- Service years: 1915–1950
- Rank: Lieutenant General
- Commands: 34th Tank Division; 4th Cavalry Corps; 8th Mechanized Corps; 38th Army; Southern Front; 57th Army; 28th Army; 3rd Guards Army
- Conflicts: Russian Civil War; World War II
- Awards: Order of Lenin (4x); Order of the Red Banner (4x); Order of Suvorov, 2nd Class

Dmitry Ivanovich Ryabyshev Russian: Дми́трий Ива́нович Ря́бышев, (23 February [O.S. 11 February] 1894 – November 18, 1985) was a Soviet military commander, commander of 8th Mechanized Corps (1941).

== Before World War II ==
Ryabyshev was born in Kolotovka, Don Host Oblast, Russian Empire (in present-day Rostov Oblast, Russia) His family were Cossacks and he joined the Imperial Russian Army during the First World War. In October 1917 he joined the Red Army. Ryabyshev was a commander of the 42nd Brigade, 14th Division of the 1st Cavalry Army during the Russian Civil War. In the inter-war years he studied at the Frunze military academy on Moscow and commanded a number of cavalry units.

== World War II ==
In June 1940 he was appointed to command 8th Mechanized Corps and fought with that unit near Lutsk and Brody during the German invasion in 1941. After his corps was destroyed he was given command of 38th Army and, briefly, Southern Front in September 1941. Towards the end of 1941 he was given the task of raising 57th Army, which he led to success in the Barvenkovo–Lozovaya offensive of January 1942. During the war he also commanded the 34th Tank Division, 4th Cavalry Corps, 28th Army and 3rd Guards Army.
