= 7th Guards Cavalry Corps =

8th Cavalry Corps (1942–1943) 7th Guards Cavalry Corps (1943–1945)
- Active: 1942–1945
- Country: Soviet Union
- Branch: Cavalry
- Role: Breakthrough and Exploitation in Deep Operations
- Size: Corps
- Battle honours: Brandenburgskaya; Order of Lenin; Order of the Red Banner; Order of Suvorov II Class

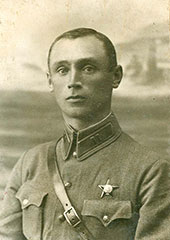
A portrait of Mikhail Petrovich Konstantinov wearing major's insignia in the late 1930s

The 7th Guards Cavalry Corps of the Soviet Union's Red Army was a cavalry corps active during the Second World War. It was formed from the 8th Cavalry Corps in February 1943.

== Second World War ==
=== 8th Cavalry Corps ===
The 8th Cavalry Corps was created on 18 January 1942 at Tula. Lieutenant General Pavel Korzun took command. It was initially composed of the

- 21st Mountain Cavalry Division,
- 52nd Cavalry Division,
- 55th Cavalry Division.

Immediately upon forming the 8th Cavalry Corps was assigned to the Bryansk Front. During the winter fighting in February - March 1942 the Corps controlled the 36th and 37th Ski Battalions. By the end of March 1942, the ski battalions and the 52nd Cavalry Division were gone. In April the corps was rebuilt:

- 21st Mountain Cavalry Division
- 55th Cavalry Division
- 112th Cavalry Division
- 148th Artillery-Mortar Regiment
- 263rd Horse Artillery Battalion (76mm guns and mortars)

The Corps completed its reorganization in June 1942. In July it went into battle with the Bryansk Front against the northern flank of the German summer offensive. After a month of hard fighting the corps went back into reserve. In October it moved south and was assigned to the 5th Tank Army in November for Operation Uranus. 13th Separate Signals Battalion, and 23rd signals air-flight. The Corps was assigned to the Southwestern Front’s in the area of the 5th Tank Army (2nd formation) (Serafimovich) north of Stalingrad where it cooperated with the 1st Tank Corps (General V. V. Butkov) during Operation Uranus. in which they had the task of cutting the railroad in the region of the stations Bolshaya Osipovka, Surovikino, and Oblivskaya. Attached to the Corps was:

- 174th Antitank Regiment
- 179th Antitank Regiment
- 35th Guards Mortar Regiment (BM-13)
- 586th Antiaircraft Regiment (37mm guns)
- 511th Flamethrower Tank Battalion

In 1943, on January 30 from the area of the Seversky Donets river, the Corps went over to the offensive in the direction of Voroshilovgrad (now Lugansk) as part of the 3rd Guards Army under the command of lieutenant general Dmitry Lelyushenko, where it was engaged in furious fighting on the approaches to the city. At dawn on February 14 began the assault, as a result of which the first provincial city in central Ukraine was liberated. Although the main role in this operation was played by the 59th, 243rd, 279th Guard rifle divisions, 2nd Guard and 2nd Tank Corps, active assistance in the liberation of Lugansk was rendered by the 8th Cavalry Corps now under the command of General Major M.D. Borisov.

The Corps was assigned by the Soviet Southwestern Front to break through German lines at Debaltsevo near the city and cut German communications. On the night of February 8, 1943, the Corps accomplished this and by February 14 the raid had been so successful that the whole corps was raised to Guards status. The Corps became the 7th Guards Cavalry Corps, and its three divisions, the 21, 35, and 112 became the 14th, 15th and 16th Guards Cavalry Divisions. During the raid the corps also included the 148th Mortar Regiment, the 263d Separate Cavalry Artillery Battalion, and the 8th Separate Antitank Artillery Battalion. It completed this most difficult raid on the rear areas of enemy, distracting significant forces of enemy from reinforcing the frontline units. The Corps sustained very heavy losses breaking out of the encirclement, but the enemy also sustained losses in manpower and material which were essential for reinforcement of the forward units.

==== Commanders ====
- 15.01.1942 — 11.05.1942 Pavel Korzun
- 12.05.1942 — 27.05.1942 Aleksey Semenovich Zhadov
- 28.05.1942 — 09.09.1942 Ivan Fedotovich Lunev
- 10.09.1942 — 16.10.1942 Aleksey Semenovich Zhadov
- 17.10.1942 — 26.10.1942 Stepan Ivanovich Dudko, KIA
- 17.10.1942 — 14.02.1943 Mikhail Dmitrievich Borisov, POW

=== 7th Guards Cavalry Corps ===
Order No. 78 of the Commissariat of the Defense of the USSR dated 14 February 1943 the corps was redesignated the 7th Guards Cavalry Corps.

- 14th Guards Cavalry Division (former 21st Cavalry Division)
- 15th Guards Cavalry Division (former 55th Cavalry Division)
- 16th Guards Cavalry Division (former 112th Cavalry Division)

After receiving its Guards designations the corps withdrew from behind German lines through snowstorms. After a week of dodging German patrols, the Corps slipped back through Soviet lines, having disrupted the rear areas and movement of most of the Panzer Corps. After returning to Soviet lines and due to the heavy losses from the Stalingrad offensive and the cavalry raid the Corps was sent into the reserves to rebuild.

Between March and May 1943 the corps was reinforced and rebuilt in the Southwestern Front. The corps sent north to join the Steppe Front in the STAVKA Reserves in June consisting of:

- 14th Guards Cavalry Division
- 15th Guards Cavalry Division
- 16th Guards Cavalry Division
- 145th Guards Antitank Regiment (76mm)
- 57th Guards Mortar Battalion (rockets)
- 7th Guards Antitank Battalion
- 1773rd Antiaircraft Regiment

The Corps was not committed in the first part of the summer offensive after Kursk, remaining in STAVKA reserves until September. Assigned to the 61st Army on 19 September 1943 the corps had added the 1897th SU Regiment (SU-76s) and the 7th Guards Mortar Regiment (120mm mortars).

From late September 1943 to March 1944 the corps operated in the 61ast or 65th Armies of the Belorussian Front, trying to enlarge the penetration south of Gomel. In January 1944 the 1897th SU Regiment was replaced by the 1816th SU Regiment (Su-76s), which remained in the Corps until the end of the war. On 5 March 1944 the Corps was sent to the 2nd Belorussian Front reserves, and in April helped clear the Germans out of the Mozyr and River Turya areas, clearing the south edges of the Pripyet marshes for operations later in the summer. On 17 May 1944, the Corps went to the 1st Belorussian Front in the area of Brest and Kobrin. On 14 July 1944 Operation Bagration began with the Corps advancing with the 2nd Tank Army,. By the end of the week, the corps had advanced 200 km, south of Lublin to Radom. The front line stabilized and the corps was on the defensive from 8 August 1944 to 7 January 1945.

When the Vistula-Oder offensive started in January 1945 the 1st Belorussian Front formed the Konstantinov Cavalry-Mechanized Group under the 7th Guards Cavalry Commander, Lieutenant General Mikhail Konstantinov. The group consisted of:

- 7th Guards Cavalry Corps
  - 14th Guards Cavalry Division
  - 15th Guards Cavalry Division
  - 16th Guards Cavalry Division
  - 1816th SU Regiment
  - 145th Guards Antitank Regiment (76mm)
  - 1773rd Antiaircraft Regiment
  - 7th Guards Antitank Battalion
  - 57th Guards Mortar Battalion (rockets)
- 7th Guards Mortar Regiment
- 9th Tank Corps
  - 23rd Tank Brigade (T-34/85)
  - 95th Tank Brigade (T-34/85)
  - 108th Tank Brigade (T-34/85)
  - 8th Motorized Rifle Brigade
  - 36th Guards Heavy Tanks Regiment (IS-IIs)
  - 1445th SU Regiment
  - 1508th SU Regiment
  - 868th Light Artillery Regiment
  - 216th Antiaircraft Regiment
  - 218th Mortar Regiment (120mm)
  - 286th Guards Mortar Battalion (rockets)
  - 90th Motorcycle Battalion

This group advanced over 400 km from the center of the 1st Belorussian front to the Oder River in just 17 days. The group then turned north into Pomerania, where it spent two months clearing the flanks of the Soviet penetration of German lines. In April and May 1945 the Group advanced as part of the Berlin Strategic Operation operating independently sweeping north of the city to seize Brandenburg and then continuing on to meet advancing units of the US 9th Army.

==== Commanders ====
- 25.02.1943 — 20.03.1943 Richard Ivanovich Golovanovsky,
- 21.03.1943 — 04.06.1943 Yakov Sergeevich Sharaburko,
- 07.06.1943 — 06.10.1943 Mikhail Maleyev,
- 07.10.1943 — 09.05.1945 Mikhail Konstantinov

== Postwar ==
The corps' 15th Guards Cavalry Division was converted into the 12th Guards Mechanized Division and transferred to another unit. In the fall of 1945 the corps, with the 14th and 16th Divisions, was transferred from Brest in the Belorussian Military District to Nakhchivan in the Baku Military District. In January 1946, the corps was converted into the 31st Guards Mechanized Division. The 14th and 16th Divisions were reduced to the 98th and 99th Guards Mechanized Regiments, respectively. In the spring of that year the 31st Guards became part of the 4th Army. In the spring of 1957, the division became the 25th Guards Motor Rifle Division, and on 17 November 1964 it was renumbered as the 23rd Guards Motor Rifle Division.

== See also ==
- ru:112-я Башкирская кавалерийская дивизия

== Sources ==
- Feskov, V.I.; Golikov, V.I.; Kalashnikov, K.A.; Slugin, S.A. (2013). Вооруженные силы СССР после Второй Мировой войны: от Красной Армии к Советской [The Armed Forces of the USSR after World War II: From the Red Army to the Soviet: Part 1 Land Forces] (in Russian). Tomsk: Scientific and Technical Literature Publishing. ISBN 9785895035306.
- Glants, D.M. (1), Soviet Military Deception in the Second World War, Frank Cass, London, 1989
- Glantz, D.M. (2), Companion to Colossus Reborn: key documents and statistics, University of Kansas2005
- Perecheni No.4, Command of Corps which were a part of the active Army during the years of the Great Patriotic War 1941-45, Supplement to the direction of the General Staff for year 1956 No.168780, Moscow, 1956
- Murphy, David E. "'Operation Ring': The Black Berets in Azerbaijan." The Journal of Soviet Military Studies, Vol. 5, No. 1, March 1992.
