= 5th Cavalry Corps (Soviet Union) =

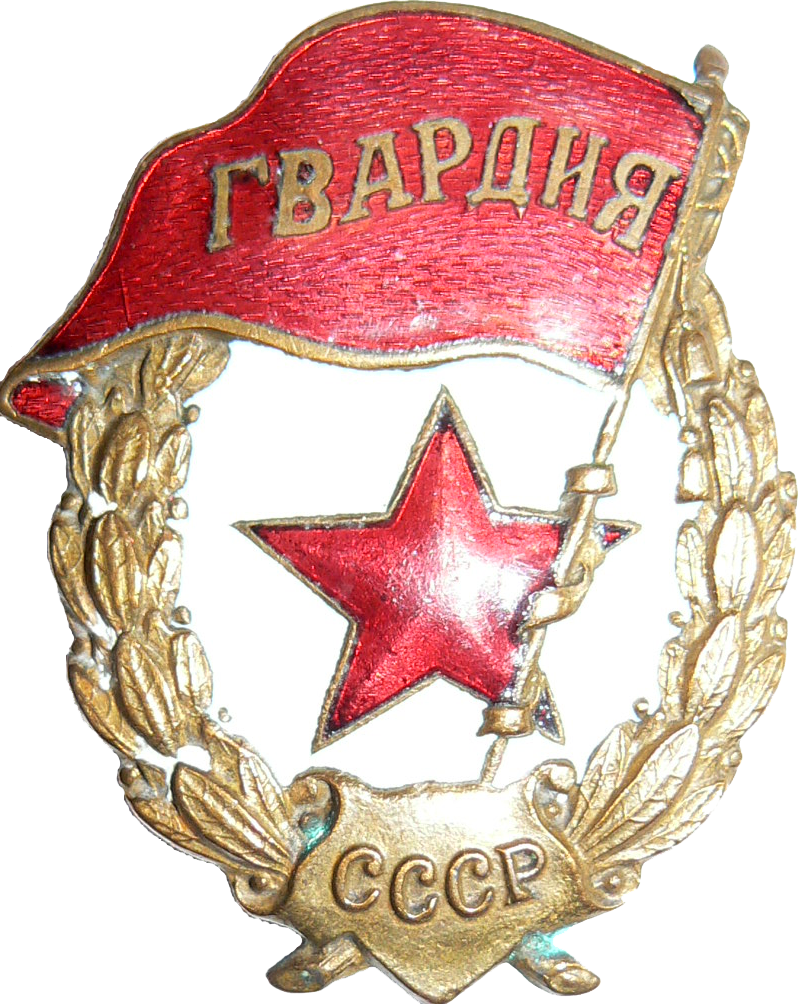
- Allegiance: Soviet Union
- Branch: Soviet Red Army
- Engagements: Soviet invasion of Poland; Eastern Front (World War II); Operation Barbarossa

Commanders
- Notable commanders: Konstantin Rokossovsky; Vasily Kryuchenkin; Issa Pliyev; Nikolai Oslikovsky

The 5th Cavalry Corps was a cavalry corps of the Red Army.

The 5th Cavalry Corps headquarters was formed at Pskov in accordance with a Red Army General Staff directive of 25 August 1935 and a Leningrad Military District directive of 8 February 1936, under the command of Komdiv Konstantin Rokossovsky. The corps included the 16th, 25th, and 30th Cavalry Divisions. During the Great Purge, Rokossovsky was arrested and imprisoned on 17 August 1937. His successor, Kombrig Dmitry Vaynerkh-Vanyarkh, was arrested on 10 February 1938 and later executed. Komdiv Vasily Gonin succeeded command of the corps on 6 June 1938. The 30th Cavalry Division was disbanded in 1938 and the 16th and 25th Cavalry Divisions transferred in 1939. The corps headquarters moved from Pskov to Kamenets-Podolsk in May 1939, transferring to the Kiev Special Military District together with its 16th Cavalry Division. After the relocation of the corps headquarters, Gonin was found drunkenly harassing passerby in the streets of Kamenets-Podolsk on 18 June. However, he did not face serious consequences for this, with his case being referred to a court of honor.

In July 1939 the 9th Cavalry Division transferred to the corps, remaining part of it until 1940. The corps took part in the Soviet invasion of Poland, advancing into the region annexed as western Ukraine in September 1939, with the 9th and 16th Cavalry Divisions assigned. Gonin and 9th Cavalry Division commander Nikolay Belov were reprimanded in October for appropriating trophies for themselves during the campaign, with Gonin storing four hunting rifles in his vehicle. In December, Gonin was transferred to command the 34th Rifle Corps in the Winter War, and subsequently shot for drinking instead of leading his troops. Komdiv Dmitry Gustishev took over command of the corps. In June 1940 the 14th and 32nd Cavalry Divisions were assigned to the corps, which took part in the Soviet occupation of Bessarabia. When the corps returned from Bessarabia, Rokossovsky, freed from prison, was restored to his old command. The 3rd Cavalry Division was assigned later in 1940.

It was part of the 12th Army. It later became part of the 6th Army.

On the Eastern Front of World War II, the corps distinguished itself in the Yelets Offensive, as a result of which, for courage shown in battle, in December 1941 it received the name of Guards and was transformed into the 3rd Guards Cavalry Corps. At the same time, the 3rd Cavalry Division of the corps became the 5th Guards Cavalry Division.

The 3rd Guards Cavalry Corps participated in the rest of the War as part of the Kalinin, Western, Bryansk, 1st and 2nd Baltic, South-West, South, Stalingrad, Don, 2nd and 3rd Belorussian fronts.

After the end of the war, the 5th Guards Cavalry Division and the 3rd Guards Cavalry Corps became part of the Northern Group of Forces at Lublin, but soon withdrew to Izyaslav in the Carpathian Military District. It was reduced to the 5th Guards Cavalry Regiment in May and June 1946 when the 3rd Guards Cavalry Corps was reduced to a division. The regiment and division were disbanded in April 1948.

== Organization ==
1939:

- 9th Cavalry Division
- 16th Cavalry Division
- 23rd Independent Tank Brigade

1941:

- 3rd Cavalry Division
- 14th Cavalry Division

== Sources ==
- Dvoinykh, L.V.; Kariaeva, T.F.; Stegantsev, M.V., eds. (1993). Центральный государственный архив Советской армии: Путеводитель [A Guide to the Central State Archive of the Soviet Army] (in Russian). Vol. 2. Minneapolis: Eastview Publications. ISBN 1879944030.
- Feskov, V.I.; Golikov, V.I.; Kalashnikov, K.A.; Slugin, S.A. (2013). Вооруженные силы СССР после Второй Мировой войны: от Красной Армии к Советской [The Armed Forces of the USSR after World War II: From the Red Army to the Soviet: Part 1 Land Forces] (in Russian). Tomsk: Scientific and Technical Literature Publishing. ISBN 9785895035306.
- Grigoryan, Ararat; Milbakh, Vladimir; Chernavsky, Alexander (2013). Политические репрессии командно-начальствующего состава 1937-1938. Ленинградский военный округ [Political Repression of Command Personnel, 1937–1938: Leningrad Military District] (in Russian). St. Petersburg: St. Petersburg University Press. ISBN 978-5-288-05282-8.
- Milbakh, V. S.; Negoda, N. V.; Churakov, D. P. (2020). Политические репрессии командно-начальствующего состава, 1937–1938 гг. Киевский военный округ [Political repressions of command personnel, 1937–1938: Kiev Military District] (in Russian). Saint Petersburg: Gangut. ISBN 978-5-85875-565-4.
