= Iosif Apanasenko =

Soviet army general (1890–1943)

Iosif Rodionovich Apanasenko
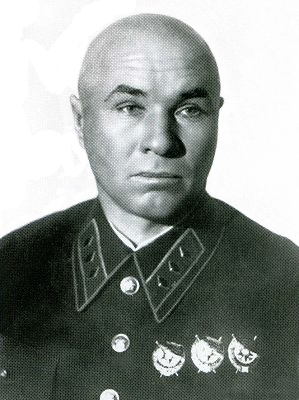
- Born: April 15, 1890; Russian Empire
- Died: August 5, 1943 (aged 53) Belgorod, Russian SFSR, Soviet Union
- Allegiance: Russian Empire; Soviet Union
- Branch: Imperial Russian Army; Soviet Red Army
- Service years: 1911–1917 (Russian Empire); 1923–1943 (Soviet Union)
- Rank: General of the Army
- Commands: 6th Cavalry Division (Soviet Union); Central Asian Military District; Far Eastern Front
- Conflicts: World War I; Russian Civil War; World War II; Battle of Kursk †

Iosif Rodionovich Apanasenko (Russian: Иосиф Родионович Апанасенко) (April 15 (April 3 O.S.), 1890 – August 5, 1943) was a Soviet division commander.

== Career ==
Iosif Apanasenko was an ethnic Russian, born in a village in Stavropol province. His family were poor peasants. As a teenager, he worked as a labourer and a shepherd. In 1911, he was drafted into the Imperial Russian Army, and fought in World War I, at the end of which he was commander of a machine gun regiment. After the Bolshevik Revolution, he returned to his native village, where he was elected chairman of the Military Revolutionary Committee. In May 1918, he organised a partisan detachment to fight against the White Army. Later in 1918, he took command of the Sixth Cavalry Division of the Red Cavalry, commanded by Semyon Budyonny, and fought in the Civil War across South Russia and Ukraine to Lviv, but during the Polish–Soviet War, members of the Sixth Cavalry Division committed particularly serious atrocities against the Jews and the political commissar who tried to restore order was killed, and Apanasenko was dismissed from his command for failing to keep his men under control. Afterwards, 387 of his men were arrested as suspected pogromists, of whom 167 were executed. The rest were acquitted or received prison terms. The trials continued in a closed session, and it is believed that up to 400 pogromists may have been executed.

Apanasenko was allowed to re-enlist in the cavalry as commander of the Fifth Cavalry Division in 1924, after undergoing military training. In 1935–38, he was deputy commander of the Belarus Military District. He was one of a number of former cavalry officers to receive rapid promotion during the Great Purge, being appointed Commander of the Central Asian Military District in February 1938. In 1941, he was elected a candidate member of the Central Committee of the Communist Party of the Soviet Union, promoted to the rank of General, and appointed Commander of the Far Eastern Front. As it became clear that there was no risk of another war with Japan on the Chinese border, he made numerous requests to be transferred to the front to fight the Germans, and was appointed deputy commander of the Voronezh Front. He visited units on the frontline and led them during the fighting. He was killed by an airstrike during the Soviet counteroffensive at Kursk. He was a recipient of the Order of Lenin and the Order of the Red Banner.

== Sources ==
- Социокультурный состав советской военной элиты 1931—1938 гг. и её оценки в прессе русского зарубежья
- Командный и начальствующий состав Красной Армии в 1940-1941 гг pages 112—113

Military offices
Preceded by Savely Negovora	Commander of the 6th Cavalry Division; March–June 1919	Succeeded by Semyonov
Preceded by Boris Solovyov	Commander of the 6th Cavalry Division; July 1919	Succeeded by Alexey Polyakov
Preceded by Grigory Baturin	Commander of the 6th Cavalry Division; October–November 1919	Succeeded by Semyon Timoshenko
Preceded by Semyon Timoshenko	Commander of the 6th Cavalry Division; August–October 1920	Succeeded by Yakov Sheko
Preceded by Leonid Petrovsky	Commander of the Central Asian Military District; 1938–1941	Succeeded by Sergei Trofimenko
Preceded by Grigori Shtern	Commander of the Far Eastern Front; January 1941 – April 1943	Succeeded by Maksim Purkayev
