= Mikhail Maleyev =

Soviet corps commander

Mikhail Maleev
- Native name: Михаил Фёдорович Малеев
- Born: 1899; Don Host Oblast, Russian Empire
- Died: 23 February 1964 (aged 64–65) Volgograd, Soviet Union
- Allegiance: Soviet Union
- Branch: Soviet Red Army
- Service years: 1918–1955
- Commands: 17th Cavalry Corps; 4th Cavalry Corps; 7th Guards Cavalry Corps; 5th Guards Cavalry Corps
- Conflicts: Russian Civil War; World War II

Mikhail Maleyev (Russian: Михаил Фёдорович Малеев; 1899 – 23 February 1964) was a Soviet corps commander.

He fought for the Bolsheviks in the civil war against the White movement and against Nazi Germany in the Second World War.

He was a recipient of the Order of Lenin, Order of the Red Banner, Order of Suvorov, Order of Kutuzov and the Order of the Red Star. He retired at the age of 56.

Preceded by Lieutenant General Timofey Shapkin	Commander of the 4th Cavalry Corps; March 25 – June 4, 1943	Succeeded by None
