= 131st Rifle Division =

131st Rifle Division (August 1939 – June 1, 1940) 131st Motorized Division (June 1, 1940 – July 29, 1941) 131st Rifle Division (July 29, 1941 – December 27, 1941) 131st Rifle Division (December 25, 1941 – 1947)
- Active: 1939–1947
- Country: Soviet Union
- Branch: Red Army (1939-46)
- Type: Infantry
- Size: Division
- Engagements: Operation Barbarossa; Battle of Brody (1941); Battle of Kiev (1941); Case Blue; Battle of Stalingrad; Siege of Leningrad; Leningrad–Novgorod offensive Krasnoye Selo–Ropsha offensive Battle of Narva (1944); Tallinn offensive Moonsund operation
- Decorations: Order of the Red Banner (2nd Formation)
- Battle honours: Ropsha (2nd Formation)

Commanders
- Notable commanders: Col. Nikolai Vasilevich Kalinin; Col. Pavel Ivanovich Morozov; Col. Fyodor Ivanovich Komarov; Col. Kirill Kochoevich Dzhakhua; Col. Mikhail Aleksandrovich Pesochin; Maj. Gen. Pyotr Logvinovich Romanenko

The 131st Rifle Division was first formed as an infantry division of the Red Army in August 1939 in the Kiev Special Military District, based on the shtat (table of organization and equipment) of the following month. In May 1940 the division was converted to a motorized division, which officially took place on June 1. In March 1941 it was assigned to Maj. Gen. K. K. Rokossovsky's 9th Mechanized Corps and was under this command west of Kyiv when the German invasion began in June. Rokossovsky immediately took measures to provide additional transport to the division so it was able to intervene in the fighting around Lutsk on June 24, but this was unable to do more than delay the German advance, at considerable cost in men and machines. Over the following weeks it fell back to the northeast, gradually losing strength until on July 29 it was again designated as the 131st Rifle Division. In this capacity it continued to fight into mid-September when it was trapped, along with its 5th Army and Southwestern Front, in the Kyiv encirclement.

A new division had been formed in the Ural Military District in late December and it was soon designated as the new 131st Rifle Division. After a diversion to the north the division moved back southward, becoming part of 1st Reserve Army, which would become 64th Army in July. When it arrived at the fighting front it joined Stalingrad Front, but was soon moved to that Front's 1st Tank Army. When this Army was disbanded it returned to the 64th Army briefly, then to 62nd Army. Although encircled west of the Don River in early August it was mostly able to escape to the east bank where it took up defenses until the last week of the month, when it was forced to retreat to the outskirts of Stalingrad itself. In early September it was involved in the fighting in the southernmost part of the city, in particular the suburbs of Minina and Kuporosnoye, before falling back to the area of the Food Combine and Lumber Factory. Decimated in this fighting, the remnants were evacuated across the Volga in the third week of the month and then sent to the Reserve of the Supreme High Command for a substantial rebuilding. During this process it was moved well to the north, joining 55th Army of Leningrad Front in February 1943. During the remainder of the year it saw relatively little combat, moving to 2nd Shock Army of the same Front in September. At the start of the offensive that finally threw Army Group North back from Leningrad in January 1944 the 131st played a leading role in the breakout from the Oranienbaum Bridgehead and was soon awarded a battle honor for the liberation of Ropsha; it would also be awarded the Order of the Red Banner in March. By this time it was bogged down in the difficult battles for Narva, moving first to 59th Army, and then to 8th Army, before returning to 2nd Shock. After a long pause in operations until late July the city was quickly taken, and all four of the division's regiments were awarded its name as an honorific. In September it advanced into northern Estonia, finally rejoining 8th Army for the duration of the war. Late that month it was committed to the amphibious operation to secure Saaremaa and the other Baltic islands, a campaign that continued into late November. The 131st spent the duration of the war, and a couple of years thereafter, stationed there as part of 10th Guards Army, gradually disbanded in 1947.

== 131st Motorized Division ==
The division was originally formed at Novohrad-Volynskyi in western Ukraine in the late summer of 1939 during the Red Army's pre-war buildup, but in the spring of 1940 orders came to begin its conversion to a motorized division. At this time it was under command of Col. Nikolai Vasilevich Kalinin. In March 1941 it was assigned to the 9th Mechanized Corps in the same general area. It was unusual in that it had three motorized regiments instead of the usual two. On April 28 the Corps commander, Maj. Gen. K. K. Rokossovsky, reported on the readiness of his units, noting that he had just three percent of required engineers and 22 percent of materiel support technicians. At the start of the German invasion the 131st was at full strength for personnel, but had only 595 trucks and 69 tractors of all types, and of its allotment of 104 BT tanks, only 41 percent were serviceable. Its order of battle was as follows:

- 53rd Motorized Rifle Regiment
- 593rd Motorized Rifle Regiment
- 743rd Motorized Rifle Regiment
- 58th Tank Regiment
- 409th Artillery Regiment
- 182nd Antitank Battalion
- 303rd Antiaircraft Battalion
- 115th Reconnaissance Battalion
- 218th Light Engineer Battalion
- 154th Signal Battalion
- 18th Artillery Park Battalion
- 225th Medical/Sanitation Battalion
- 140th Auto Transport Battalion
- 99th Repair and Recovery Battalion
- 32nd Regulation Company
- 238th Motorized Field Bakery
- 460th Field Postal Station
- 395th Field Office of the State Bank

9th Mechanized was assigned to 5th Army, and also contained the 20th and 35th Tank Divisions and 32nd Motorcycle Regiment. On June 22 the 131st and 35th were still in and about Novohrad-Volynskyi, while the 20th was positioned northwest of Shepetivka.

=== Battle of Brody ===
Rokossovsky was awoken at 0400 with the delivery of a telegram from 5th Army headquarters authorizing him to open a top secret operational packet. This contained a directive from the STAVKA to bring 9th Mechanized to immediate combat readiness and set out toward Rivne–Lutsk–Kovel. On his own responsibility he ordered the nearby main supply dumps to be opened to access food, fuel, and ammunition. He also requisitioned motor vehicles from the civilian economy in order to more adequately transport the 131st:

The motorized rifle division, which had the possibility of giving a ride to its infantry aboard its tanks and vehicles, albeit with heavy overloading, succeeding in reaching its designated objective by day's end, and having left the rest of the 9th Mechanized Corps 50 kilometres behind it, arrived in the Rovno area.

The situation of the tank divisions (and 58th Tank Regiment) was more difficult as their vehicles, entirely BT and T-26 types, were old and largely worn out from training, with engines and tracks near the end of their usefulness. In his memoirs the then Col. I. Kh. Bagramyan, chief of operations of Southwestern Front (former Kiev Special Military District), recalled events near the end of June 24:

On the Southwestern Front, the situation was becoming increasingly alarming. In particular, a threat was hanging over Lutsk, where... 15th Mechanized Corps was in need of urgent support... Encircled elements of the 87th and 124th Rifle Divisions near Lutsk were awaiting relief. Yet as we at Front headquarters were racking our brains, trying to find some way to come to the Lutsk grouping's aid, the main forces of the 131st Motorized Division and the forward elements of the tank divisions of K. K. Rokossovsky's 9th Mechanized Corps were arriving there. Reading his message about this, we literally couldn't believe our eyes. How did Konstantin Konstantinovich manage to do this? After all, his so-called motorized division could only move ... on foot. It turns out that the resolute and enterprising corps commander on the very first day of the war at his own peril and risk had gathered all the vehicles from the district reserve in Shepetovka - there were approximately 200 of them - loaded his infantry aboard them and got his corps rolling forward. The arrival of his units in the Lutsk area saved the situation.

The Corps began by launching an attack toward Lyniv which failed to retake any ground but managed to check the advancing III Motorized Corps along the Rivne–Lutsk highway, although at considerable cost.

By the end of June 27 the 14th Panzer Division had regrouped and forced the 131st out of Lutsk and toward the east, taking up positions at Palche by July 1. By this time Maj. Gen. R. N. Morgunov, deputy commander of Southwestern Front, was reporting that "9th Mechanized Corps is functioning as a rifle corps and defending along the Stuba River in the Klevan' region." On the other hand, during July 7 Col. Gen. M. P. Kirponos, commander of the Front, reported to the STAVKA that the tank strength of 9th Mechanized had declined to 164 vehicles, which was actually better than most such corps. On July 2 Colonel Kalinin, who had just been awarded the Order of the Red Banner, left the 131st, soon becoming the chief of staff, and then deputy commander and acting commander, of the 31st Rifle Corps, being promoted to the rank of major general on August 12. He would later lead the 91st and 159th Rifle Divisions, apart from serving in several other positions, before the end of the war. Col. Pavel Ivanovich Morozov took over the division on July 3; he had previously been Kalinin's deputy commander.

Kirponos ordered a counterattack on July 10 by 5th Army, involving the 31st Rifle Corps and three mechanized corps, including the 9th, and the 131st was able to regain the village of Nesolon, where it continued to hold until July 15. By now its strength amounted to 1,283 personnel, with 12 tanks, 27 artillery pieces, and 319 vehicles remaining. After this the Corps continued falling back east of Novohrad-Volynskyi, reaching the area southwest of Korosten by July 23. Reality was finally faced on July 29 when the division was officially reorganized as the 131st Rifle Division.

== 1st Formation ==
The reorganized division was under direct command of 5th Army, and had an order of battle very similar to that of its previous incarnation:

- 58th Rifle Regiment
- 593rd Rifle Regiment
- 743rd Rifle Regiment
- 409th Artillery Regiment
- 182nd Antitank Battalion
- 303rd Antiaircraft Battalion
- 115th Reconnaissance Battalion
- 218th Sapper Battalion
- 154th Signal Battalion
- 225th Medical/Sanitation Battalion
- 140th Auto Transport Battalion
- 520th Field Postal Station
- 345th Field Office of the State Bank

Colonel Morozov would remain in command until the division was disbanded. By August 11 it had retreated to positions north of Korosten under pressure from 79th Infantry Division. By this time elements of Army Group South had been stalled in front of the Kiev Fortified Region since late June. Furthermore, the continued existence of 5th Army appeared to constitute a threat to the flanks of both it and Army Group Center to the north. In the third week of the month Hitler decided to strike south with the 2nd Panzer Group in order to link up with 1st Panzer Group advancing from the Dniepr well south of Kyiv to encircle the bulk of Southwestern Front. By now 5th Army was deployed on a line generally to the northwest and northeast of Chernihiv, facing German 2nd Army, although the 131st had been moved south to positions along the Dniepr northwest of Oster. Its strength on August 25 was reported as 4,500 personnel, 40 artillery pieces of all calibers, 17 mortars, and roughly 70 machine guns.

By the beginning of September the German operation was well underway but even on September 11 Stalin was forbidding Kirponos from making any sort of retreat. The next day 1st Panzer Group decisively broke out of its bridgehead at Kremenchuk, and on September 13 lead elements of 3rd Panzer Division reached Lokhvytsia from the north; this would soon be the link-up point of the two panzer groups. That night Stalin again insisted that 5th Army cease any preparations for withdrawal. On September 15 the encirclement was complete and four entire Soviet armies, including the 5th, were trapped; the latter was deep in the cauldron with little chance to escape. Kyiv fell on September 19, and two days later the remnants of 5th and 21st Armies were concentrated south of the Pyriatyn–Lokhvytsia road. In the ensuing chaos Colonel Morozov and much of his staff were able to get free, but only small groups and individuals managed to do the same. The 131st remained on the books until December 27 when it, along with the other formations lost in the debacle, was officially written off. Morozov had already taken command of the 339th Rifle Division, and would go on to lead the 83rd Mountain, 20th Mountain, and 181st Rifle Divisions before the war's end.

== 2nd Formation ==
A new division began forming at Kirov in the Ural Military District on December 25, and it was soon assigned the designation of the 131st. It was filled mainly with militia and volunteers from that region, and was soon moved north by rail to the Moscow Military District. It was noted that 90 percent of its personnel were of Russian nationality. Col. Fyodor Ivanovich Komarov was immediately assigned to command, but he would leave on March 28, 1942, being replaced on April 15 by Col. Kirill Kochoevich Dzhakhua, who had previously led the 52nd Rifle Division. Its order of battle was similar to that of the first formation:

- 482nd Rifle Regiment
- 593rd Rifle Regiment
- 743rd Rifle Regiment
- 409th Artillery Regiment
- 182nd Antitank Battalion
- 437th Machine Gun Battalion (from July 23, 1942, to May 10, 1943)
- 492nd Reconnaissance Company
- 218th Sapper Battalion
- 154th Signal Battalion (later 450th Signal Company)
- 225th Medical/Sanitation Battalion
- 96th Chemical Defense (Anti-gas) Company
- 76th Auto Transport Company
- 407th Field Bakery
- 869th Divisional Veterinary Hospital
- 546th Mortar Battalion
- 1713rd Field Postal Station
- 1052nd Field Office of the State Bank

In April the division was railed north where it was assigned to the Arkhangelsk Military District, but this decision was reconsidered as it was returned to the south in May, joining the 1st Reserve Army. By this time it was becoming clear that the main German effort in the summer of 1942 would come in the south, although the STAVKA continued to suspect a renewed drive on Moscow from this direction, so the eight reserve armies were positioned appropriately.

== Battle of Stalingrad ==
On July 10 the STAVKA reorganized its forces in the Stalingrad region. Stalingrad Front was created under command of Marshal S. K. Timoshenko, with three Armies, the 62nd, 63rd, and 64th. The latter was the previous 1st Reserve, with six divisions including the 131st. The division entered the active army on July 12, but was reassigned to 1st Tank Army on July 26. On the same day Colonel Dzhakhua was placed at the disposal of Timoshenko's headquarters, being replaced by Col. Mikhail Aleksandrovich Pesochin. Dzhakhua would go on to lead the 120th and 60th Guards Rifle Divisions, while Pesochin had led the 411th Rifle Division.

1st Tank Army, as well as its companion 4th Tank Army, were still in the process of forming, but had a combined force of 600 tanks which Stalin insisted on being thrown into action on the west bank of the Don River against the oncoming German 6th Army. 1st Tank Army, under command of Maj. Gen. K. S. Moskalenko, was slated to be combat-ready by July 28 but nevertheless received orders at 2000 hours on July 26:

13th and 28th Tank Corps, 158th Tank Brigade, and 131st Rifle Division will attack from the march from the Kalach region toward Verkhne-Buzinovka to destroy the opposing enemy and capture the Verkhne-Buzinovka region by day's end on 27 July. Subsequently, the army will attack toward Kletskaia. Begin the attack at 0300 hours on 27 July.

This attack would also involve elements of 21st, 62nd, and 64th Armies, plus 8th Air Army.

Most of 1st Tank Army was already in action; 13th Tank Corps was down to some 80 vehicles after a battle with 16th Panzer Division. Logistical support for the Army was weak. Despite these difficulties it stepped off at the appointed time, while 4th Tank Army was delayed by two days. Attacking northward across a 45 km-wide front, 1st Tank Army was struck by over 1,000 Luftwaffe aircraft sorties and made only limited gains by nightfall. 28th Tank Corps, with one regiment of the 131st, reached Lipo-Lebedevskii–Lipo-Logovskii, some 20–23 km north of Kalach. XIV Panzer Corps had also suffered attrition during its advance during the previous month and was down to some 100 tanks. On July 28 the attack effectively stalled, while the 131st, 196th Rifle Division, and 28th Tank Corps threw back two counterattacks, claiming 40 tanks destroyed. In confused fighting through the last days of the month the 13th Tank Corps managed to break through to the encircled Group Kolpakchi to the north and then led a much-reduced force to the lines of 4th Tank Army late on July 31.

=== German Advance to Kalach ===
From August 1–6 the German 6th Army was forced to stand motionless due to further shortages of fuel. During this time it obtained infantry reinforcements. At 0530 hours on August 4 the STAVKA again reorganized its forces in the Stalingrad area by splitting Stalingrad Front into Stalingrad and Southeastern Fronts, with the latter containing 64th Army, now with the 131st again under command. The new Front was under command of Col. Gen. A. I. Yeryomenko. All this was effective August 7. The immediate mission of Southeastern Front was "to halt further movement of the enemy toward the southern face of the Stalingrad external defense line from the south... as well as preventing the enemy from reaching the Volga south of Stalingrad." Yeryomenko was planning a defense against 4th Panzer Army along the Myshkova River and the Abganerovo area. 64th Army was to cover a 120 km-wide sector from the Don to Tinguta Station blocking the shortest German route to Stalingrad.

Meanwhile, German 6th Army was closing up to Kalach against what remained of 62nd Army, and the 131st was now transferred to that command. The German commander, Gen. F. Paulus, was determined to crush the 62nd's bridgehead in an encirclement operation. The Army was attempting to hold its bridgehead with eight rifle divisions, including the 131st, plus two tank corps, assorted remnants of other tank units, and two student rifle regiments; altogether some 100,000 troops were on the defense backed by something under 150 tanks. The advance began on August 7. The northern pincer, consisting of several battlegroups of 16th Panzer, attacked from the Mayorovskii area, 30 km northwest of Kalach, and broke the defenses of the 131st and 33rd Guards Rifle Division, pushing to the outskirts of the town by dusk. During the evening the Red Army General Staff's daily summary painted a disastrous picture of the overall situation. While the 33rd Guards was reported as taking up new positions from the 181st Rifle Division, no information appeared from the 131st.

Two bridges crossed the Don at Kalach, which was 200m wide at this point, with steep banks. The next morning the 16th Panzer set out for these prizes. At Hill 150.7 20 Soviet tanks were defeated at the cost of several German losses. As the panzer troopers entered the valley both bridges caught fire and one later exploded, but the encirclement was completed. The evening operational summary noted that the 131st and the 28th Tank Corps (now without tanks) were "withdrawing to the Rubezhnyi region, 10 kilometres north of Kalach, under heavy pressure..." Over the next three days Paulus proceeded to mop up the Kalach pocket. On August 10 the division was reported as occupying a defense along the line Ilmenskii–Kustovskii. Despite having failed to destroy 62nd Army, Paulus declared victory on August 12, claiming eight divisions, including the 131st, as wiped out, plus a number of other units. In fact, although four divisions were largely destroyed, the 131st managed to get most of the 6,279 men it had begun the battle with over the Don to take up new defenses on the east bank.

=== Defense of Stalingrad ===
During August 9–12 Yeryomenko had been planning for the defense of Stalingrad itself. The "intact" portion of 62nd Army (131st, 112th, and 399th Rifle Divisions, 28th Tank Corps, 20th Motorized Brigade, 115th Fortified Region) was to defend the Don while also assisting the escape of the troops still trapped to the west. The 131st dug in along a line from Ryumino-Krasnoiskii to Kanyshi. In addition to defensive missions Yeryomenko intended to disrupt Paulus' plans through coordinated counterattacks on August 19–20:

62nd Army will force the Don in the Vertiachii and Peskovatka sectors on the night of 19–20 August with two rifle divisions, reinforced by tank brigades, and reach the Golubaia River in the Hill 197 and Malonabatovskii sector [west of the Don] by attacking toward the north and northwest where it will dig in.

The 131st was not part of this plan. In the event it was made moot by the renewed German advance on August 21.

Overnight on August 20/21 6th Army's assault force took up positions across from Vertiachii. The opposed crossings the next day were difficult but successful, and by 1630 hours a pontoon bridge was in place at Lutchenskii. All this was considerably north of the 131st's sector. At dawn on August 23 the Soviet defense collapsed and XIV Panzer Corps began a headlong advance across the unbroken steppe toward the north end of Stalingrad. Under the circumstances the division, along with the 399th and 20th Motorized, had little option but to retreat to the Rossoshka River. The corridor driven by the panzers to the Volga was narrow and appeared vulnerable to counterattack. The commander of 62nd Army, Lt. Gen. A. I. Lopatin, was ordered to strike toward Vertiachii, in cooperation with 4th Tank Army, on August 24, but this failed, while overnight two regiments of the 71st Infantry Division got over the Don just north of Kalach, forcing the 131st and 399th to begin to fall back 5–8 km, although Yeryomenko forbade a full withdrawal to the Rossoshka. This finally took place by August 31, but by late on that day the LI Army Corps penetrated the defense of this line, leaving a large part of both 64th and 62nd Armies, including the 131st, partly encircled west of the Chervlennaya River. At 2000 on September 1 Yeryomenko finally authorized a withdrawal by the two Armies to the "Novaia Nadezhda, Peschanka, and Ivanovka line as rapidly as possible." Paulus had an opportunity to cut off this withdrawal with XIV Panzer, but delayed until the force had pulled back to the city's defenses.

=== Into the suburbs ===
By late September 2 the 131st had taken up its new positions, which were described as follows:

Occupy Hill 115.8, Hill 144.9, and Verkhniaia El'shanka (incl.) defensive region and prepare counterattacks along the Babaevo, Peschanka, Zelenaia Poliana axes.

This placed it and the 35th Guards Rifle Division on the left flank of the Army, a flank that was largely uncovered by the withdrawal of 64th Army to the south. According to the plan to penetrate the city itself the XXXXVIII Panzer Corps of 4th Panzer Army deployed from Voroponovo Station to Elkhi, with the objective of driving through to the Volga before seizing the portion of the city south of the Tsaritsa River, which was the boundary between the two Soviet armies. The defense would be based on the 35th Guards, 87th, the reinforcing 244th Rifle Division, and what remained of 33rd Guards. The attack began at dawn on September 3, and the defenses of 33rd Guards were soon overrun, leaving the eastern approaches to Peschanka open. However, in spite of losing some ground west of that place, Pesochin's troops, with the help of 20th Antitank Brigade of 64th Army, managed to hold an organized defense in the Voroponovo and Peschanka sectors, as well as Staro-Dubovka to the south.

Over the next few days this defense, now backed by 35th Guards and the remnants of 33rd Guards, continued to hold against the 24th Panzer Division. XXXXVIII Panzer regrouped on September 7, in the course of which the commander of 24th Panzer was severely wounded and the commander of its 4th Motorcycle Battalion was killed, the latter by Soviet shellfire. The next day the XXXXVIII Panzer renewed its drive into south Stalingrad. 14th Panzer Division, with fewer than 24 tanks remaining, finally forced the 131st, 35th Guards, and 20th Antitank to abandon Peschanka; they pulled back to new defenses from just west of Elshanka south along the southern fringes of Kuporosnoye. On September 10 the 29th Motorized Division reached the Volga at that place, splitting the 62nd and 64th Armies. As of the next day the strength of the 131st was reported as 2,540 personnel, one of the highest in 62nd Army.

Late on September 10 the division was "defending along its previous lines and withdrawing into the command's reserve in the vicinity of the railroad junction in the southern part of Stalingrad..." The earlier thrust by 29th Motorized, along with an assault by 14th Panzer had forced the 131st to pull back to Gornaya Polyana Sovkhoz, south of Minina, while the 35th Guards took up new positions. Overnight, a series of wild melees began which, over the course of the next four days, drove the 29th Motorized away from the river under the impact of concentric north–south blows by the two Soviet divisions. As this went on, three divisions of 64th Army were pushed back to a new line east and west of Gornaya Polyana, relieving the 131st and allowing it to move to the northeast to Kuporosnoye. As evidence of the poor state of communications within the Front, the commander of 64th Army was 24 hours late in receiving information of its retaking, despite his own 126th Rifle Division having been involved in the action.

Lt. Gen. V. I. Chuikov now took command of 62nd Army, just as the battle for the suburbs was ending. The 131st still had something over 2,000 personnel, but only about half of these were "bayonets" (riflemen and sappers). It was now in the southernmost sector of the city, south of the Tsaritsa and west of Sadovaya Station, in reserve behind the 244th Division, 10th Rifle Brigade, and 6th Tank Brigade.

=== Battle for the city ===
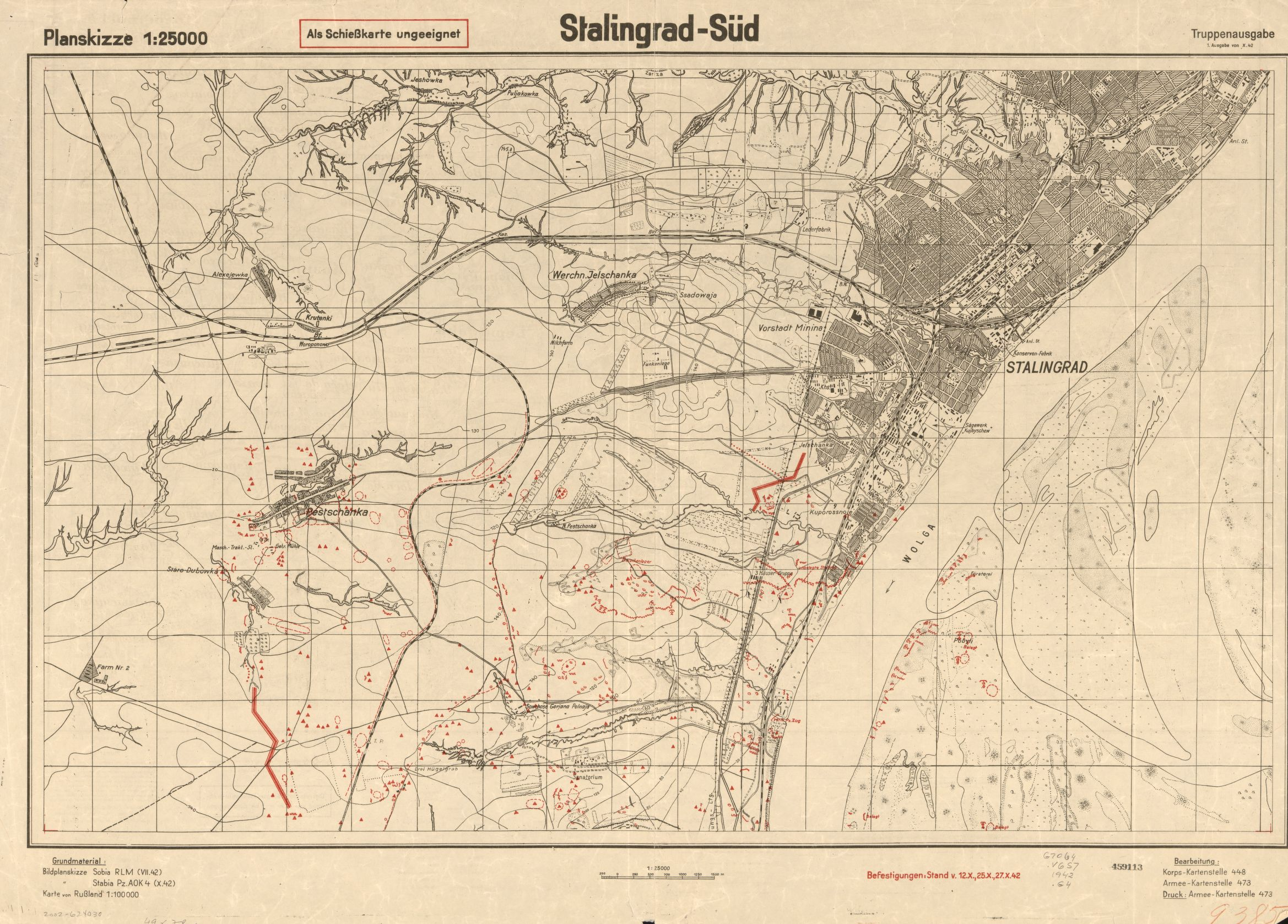
1942 German map of Stalingrad showing Minina and the Tsaritsa River

On September 13, 6th Army finally began its drive into the southern and central sectors of Stalingrad, following a heavy artillery bombardment and an incendiary air raid which killed over 300 civilians. The Red Army replied with artillery and Katyusha fire, much from the far side of the Volga. The heavy fire limited the German gains to just a few hundred metres on most sectors, but disruptions to Chuikov's communications made it difficult to monitor the fighting. 29th Motorized took the southwest section of Minina from the 35th Guards and a regiment of 10th NKVD Rifle Division, despite support from the 131st. Late that evening, Yeryomenko ordered Chuikov to mount counterattacks to eliminate the German penetrations. While unsuccessful, they threw the 71st Infantry off its stride. The units being supported by the 131st continued to hold their positions up to 1400 hours. As darkness fell on September 13 the 13th Guards Rifle Division began to arrive in downtown Stalingrad.

At 0330 hours on September 15 the reinforced 24th Panzer began a drive into the heart of southern Stalingrad city. It struck due eastward along and north of the railroad line into southern Stalingrad, leaving a battlegroup based on the 21st Panzergrenadier Regiment to mop up bypassed Soviet forces of 42nd Rifle Brigade and the 244th. The panzers and their supporting infantry took Railroad Station No. 2 at 1600 before making a fast dash to the railroad bridge over the Tsaritsa at 1615. The 24th Panzer, considerably strung out, formed a series of all-round defense positions for the night. Early the next day the 29th Motorized, with tank support from 14th Panzer, struck just south of the Elshanka River against the 131st, 35th Guards, 10th NKVD and 133rd Tank Brigade on the western approaches to Elshanka and Kuporosnoye. The defense was shattered and a disorganized fighting withdrawal followed, eastward into south Stalingrad and the narrow strip of the Volga's bank south of the Tsaritsa and Elshanka rivers. Chuikov's headquarters reported at the end of the day:

35th Gds. RD, with 131st RD, 10th Destroyer Brigade, 52nd Separate MG-Arty Bn, fought a fierce battle with attacking enemy during the day, suffering losses of up to 75-80 percent of their personnel from aircraft and artillery, and were fighting on the western outskirts of Minina suburb and northern outskirts of Kuporosnoe line by day's end.

By the next day the remnants of these forces had taken up positions on the high ground south of the Tsaritsa, in and around the Barracks area, waiting for reinforcements from the fresh 92nd Rifle Brigade. The mission of 24th Panzer for September 16 was to take a bridgehead across the Tsaritsa, link up with the 71st Infantry, and eliminate bypassed Soviet forces. Meanwhile, the 94th Infantry Division was to clear the remainder of Minina, cross the Elshanka, and clear the buildings and streets between the railroad and the Volga.

Just after dawn the 94th, with four battalion shock groups in the lead, attacked successfully to the northeast through the northern part of Minina, forcing one regiment of the 131st, 10th NKVD, and 133rd Tank Brigade to abandon their positions. However, once the Elshanka was crossed just before noon the 94th ran into much stiffer resistance among the gullies and on the railroad embankment beyond, where the three Soviet units took their stand. The fighting continued into the Stalingrad Food Combine, with both sides suffering heavy losses until the 94th called a halt in the late afternoon. Meanwhile, 29th Motorized was tasked with dislodging the other two regiments of the 131st and the remnants of 35th Guards from southern Minina and Kuporosnoye, taking Lumber Factory No. 2 and the Elektroles Power Plant, and crossing the Elshanka where it reaches the Volga. In the event, Soviet resistance halted the advance well short of the Elshanka. Chuikov, alarmed by the situation in the south, sent orders at 1230 hours for the remnants of the 131st, 10th Brigade, and 270th Regiment of 10th NKVD to be amalgamated with 35th Guards under the latter's commander, Col. V. P. Dubianskii. It was to "defend the sector: on the right of the railroad (Sadovaya Station and Stalingrad Station No. 2) and on the left of the Volga River."

The battle for south Stalingrad culminated on September 17 when 71st Infantry linked up with 24th Panzer along the Tsaritsa, less than 1,000m from Chuikov's command post. In the evening, according to his report to the STAVKA, "35th Gds. RD and 131st RD were continuing to occupy positions in the southern part of the city in the vicinity of the water tower and to the north." The regiment of the division that was mixed with 133rd Tank Brigade and the 271st Regiment of 10th NKVD continued to offer stubborn resistance to the 267th Regiment of 94th Infantry as it also sought to link up with 24th Panzer, as the latter was tied up in fighting for the Grain Elevator. The 267th eventually stalled in the narrow strip of land between the railroad and the Volga through the Food Combine to the north bank of the Elshanka. 29th Motorized, which was slated to be withdrawn for an advance toward Astrakhan, made minor progress in the Lumber Factory and the Elektroles, driving the 35th Guards, the bulk of the 131st, and the 270th NKVD north across the Elshanka or down to the bank of the Volga. However, several fortified strongpoints continued to hold.

On September 18 the combined 131st, 35th Guards, and 10th Brigade pushed back several German attacks and continued to hold the rail line 1,000m north of the Grain Elevator, then a line to the water tower and Lvov Lane. Evening orders directed the force to continue to hold, while most of 62nd Army was ordered to counterattack the next day. These attacks made little progress. By now Dubianskii's entire force consisted of just several hundred men defending buildings along a front of some 1,500m from the northeast corner of the Food Combine south to the lower Elshanka and then east to the west bank of the Volga. During the afternoon riflemen of 94th Infantry, backed by about 20 tanks of 29th Motorized, broke the defense southeast of Station No. 2. Without artillery or tank support Dubianskii ordered a fighting withdrawal toward the Volga to the last remaining route of escape: crossings of the lower Tsaritsa being held open by the 92nd Rifle Brigade.

Finally, on September 20 Chuikov ordered Dubianskii to transfer his sector north of the Elshanka to the 92nd Rifle Brigade and withdraw the survivors of the 35th Guards, 131st, and 271st NKVD into second echelon, in preparation for evacuation to the east bank of the Volga. This turned into a fighting withdrawal during which one group of guardsmen was encircled near the Grain Elevator and refused to withdraw despite orders. After being reinforced by a battalion of naval riflemen of the 92nd, Dubianskii's force was able to cut through a battalion of the 94th Infantry to reach the landing mole that was defended by 10th Brigade. Other elements of the 131st crossed the Tsaritsa to join up with 42nd Rifle Brigade. The few support elements and the headquarters of the division crossed the Volga overnight on September 22/23. Although the division was still officially on Stalingrad Front's order of battle on October 1, along with many other decimated divisions and brigades, it was in deep reserve for a near complete rebuilding, moving later that month to 2nd Reserve Army of the Reserve of the Supreme High Command.

== Redeployment to the North ==
As the division rebuilt it was again moved to the north. On January 18 land communications were established with the city and garrison of Leningrad during Operation Iskra. In early February the 131st was assigned to Leningrad Front's 55th Army, which had been defending the city since September 1941. It would remain under command of this Front for the duration of the war. At about this time the Army took part in the Battle of Krasny Bor, but the role of the 131st was secondary. On July 22 the 55th and 67th Armies, plus the 8th Army of Volkhov Front, had begun the Fifth Sinyavino Offensive in a renewed effort to take that place as well as Mga. The fighting continued until August 22, although the two sides had come to a standstill by August 4, with the Sinyavino Heights still in German hands and Mga still well in the rear.

In mid-September a lull settled over the front south of Leningrad. Army Group North and Leningrad Front, commanded by Col. Gen. L. A. Govorov, both prepared for the inevitable resumption of battle. At about this time the 131st was reassigned to 2nd Shock Army, which would be tasked with the critical role in the upcoming offensive, the breakout from the Oranienbaum bridgehead. On November 18 Colonel Pesochin left the division to attend the Voroshilov Academy on an accelerated course. After graduating in May 1944 he was given command of the 225th Rifle Division, but was seriously wounded in Silesia on February 11, 1945, and died of his wounds in hospital in Lviv on May 3. Col. Pyotr Logvinovich Romanenko took over the 131st for the duration of the war, being promoted to the rank of major general on June 22, 1944. This officer had previously served in staff positions of the 128th Rifle Division and in command of the 73rd Naval Rifle Brigade. In November the division was assigned to 43rd Rifle Corps, still in 2nd Shock, but shifted to the Army's 122nd Rifle Corps in December.

== Leningrad-Novgorod Offensive ==
122nd Corps was under command of Maj. Gen. P. A. Zaitsev, who had previously led the 168th Rifle Division, also part of the Corps, with its third division being the 11th Rifle. 2nd Shock Army was led by Lt. Gen. I. I. Fedyuninsky. His first task was to transfer his Army into the bridgehead, making use of the Baltic Fleet to move it across the ice roads over the Gulf of Finland. The process began on November 5 and continued until January 21, 1944, after the offensive had already begun.

=== Krasnoye Selo-Ropsha Offensive ===
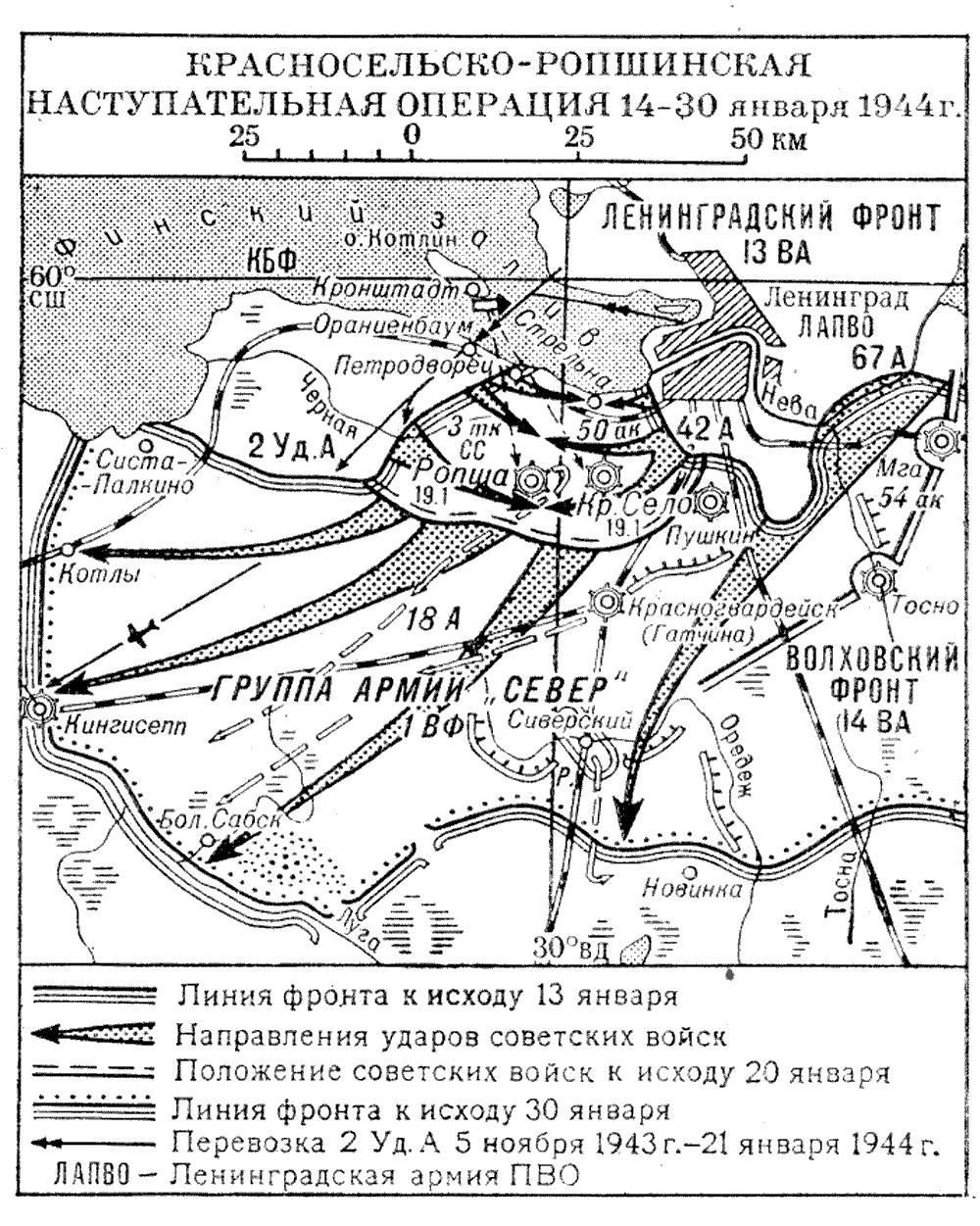
Soviet-era map of the offensive

Govorov planned to have 2nd Shock and 42nd Armies break through the German lines they faced and then link up at Ropsha, cutting off the German forces between that place and the Gulf of Finland. This would also reestablish land communications with Oranienbaum. Fediuninsky placed his 122nd Corps in first echelon of the attack, with the 131st and 11th in first echelon of the Corps and the 168th in second echelon.

The offensive began at dawn on January 14 with a massive artillery preparation of 104,000 shells over 65 minutes against the positions of the 9th and 10th Luftwaffe Field Divisions. Despite extensive fortifications built since 1941 the massed Soviet riflemen of the 131st, plus the 48th and 90th Rifle Divisions of 43rd Corps, assisted by tanks, soon overcame the forward defenses and by day's end had gained up to 3 km on a 10 km-wide front. The advance continued overnight as the 131st and 90th Divisions, supported by 2nd and 204th Tank Regiments and 152nd Tank Brigade, pushed forward another 4 km, and the next day shattered what was left of 10th Luftwaffe Division, while the 168th was committed from second echelon. 2nd Shock was finally halted by heavy fire west of Ropsha. 42nd Army also made good progress from its side on the first two days.

January 16 saw the battle develop with greater fury and during its course Fediuninsky's forces completed the penetration of the main defensive belt. He now formed a small mobile group from a tank brigade, a self-propelled artillery regiment, a battalion of infantry in trucks, an artillery battalion, and other units with orders to take Ropsha at all costs. Counterattacks brought this to a halt halfway to the objective. While the German High Command debated the retreat of 18th Army the entire 2nd Shock Army surged ahead on January 18 and the 122nd Corps took Ropsha the next day. In recognition the division received a battle honor:

ROPSHA - ...131st Rifle Division (Colonel Romanenko, Pyotr Logvinovich)... By order of the Supreme High Command of 19 January 1944 and a commendation in Moscow, the troops who participated in the battles for the liberation of Krasnoye Selo and Ropsha are given a salute of 20 artillery salvoes from 224 guns.

The same day, at 2100 hours the 462nd Rifle Regiment of the 168th linked up with the 54th Engineer Battalion of 42nd Army's mobile group just south of the town. On the morning of January 20 the two Armies met all along their fronts, closing the door behind the German grouping to the north. On February 21 Romanenko would be made a Hero of the Soviet Union for his leadership during the offensive.

The next objective, apart from mopping up the encircled German forces, was to advance in the direction of Luga. This would involve 42nd Army capturing Krasnogvardeisk and 2nd Shock protecting its right flank. By January 24 the Army was advancing along the Krasnogvardeisk–Kingisepp railroad, but only made modest gains against stiffening resistance. During the next two days the 108th and 122nd Corps jointly captured Elizavetino. Unbeknownst to Hitler, the chief of staff of Army Group North ordered the overdue withdrawal to begin overnight on January 27/28. At about this time the 131st was moved back to 43rd Corps.

== Battle of Narva ==
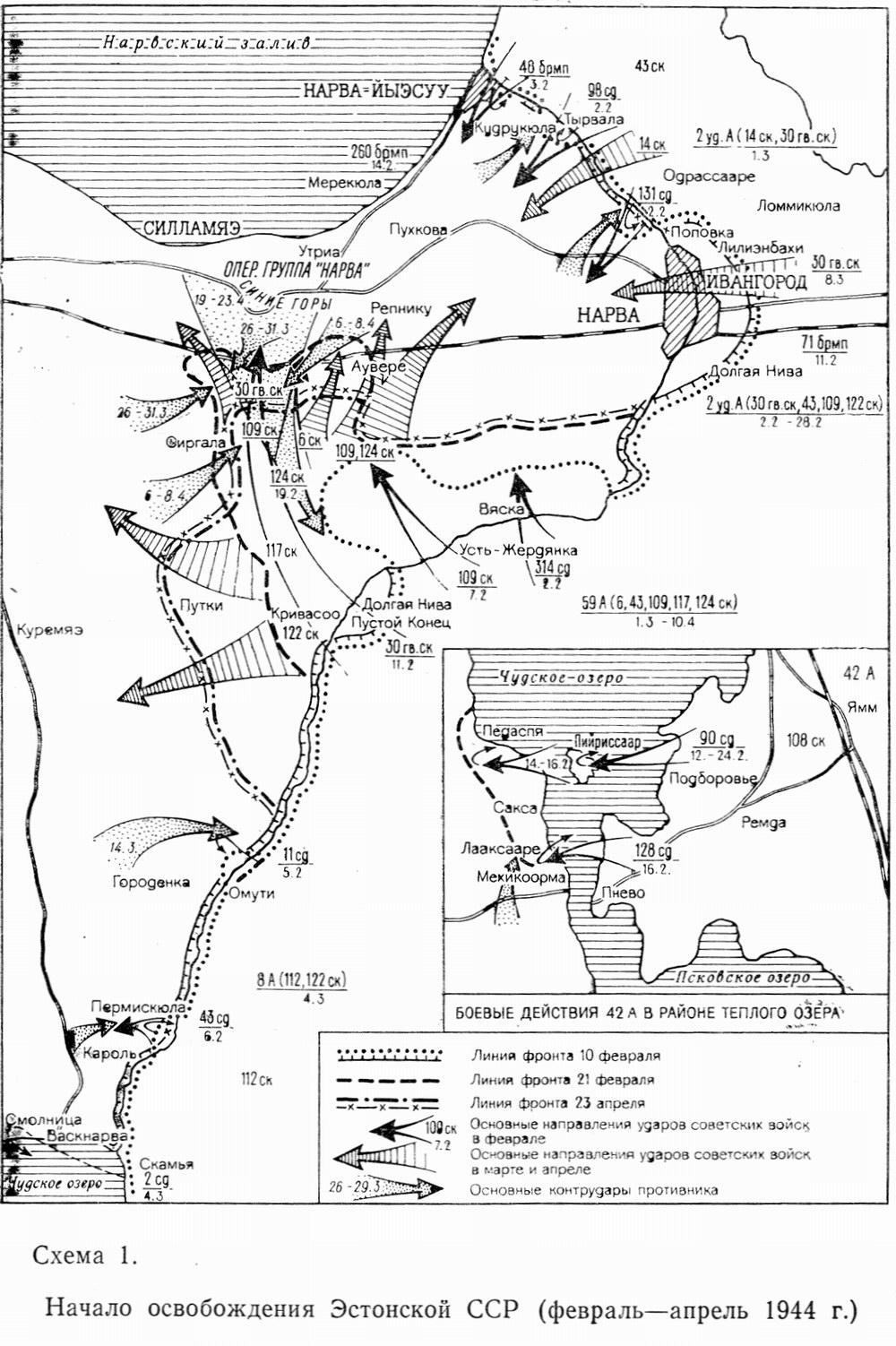
Battle of Narva, February 2 - April 23, 1944. Note the 131st's initial bridgehead north of the city.

On January 29 Govorov ordered 2nd Shock and 42nd Armies to force the Luga River prior to clearing the south shore of the Gulf of Finland, then reach and establish bridgeheads over the Narva River prior to an advance into Estonia. This advance began on February 1 and, after a 15-minute artillery preparation, initially made rapid progress. While 109th Rifle Corps took Kingisepp the 43rd and 122nd Corps pushed on to the Narva, taking lodgements north and south of the Narva fortress respectively; the 131st was directly north of Narva. In light of this success Govorov transferred the 30th Guards Rifle Corps to Fediuninsky's command. With this assistance he was to widen and deepen his bridgeheads, break the defense west of the river, envelop and take Narva. This would be assisted by the Baltic Fleet landing the 115th and 260th Naval Infantry Brigades in the German rear. The line was defended by the III SS Panzer Corps, which was armored in name only.

2nd Shock battled for a week to destroy III SS Corps with little success. A new plan was approved by Govorov and the fighting was renewed on February 11 but fell well short of its objectives. 43rd Corps advanced up to 2 km on a 4 km-wide front but was halted by the 227th Infantry Division and the SS Nederland Brigade. Southwest of Narva the 109th and 122nd Corps managed to gain 12 km to the west and northwest over five days of combat before also being forced to a standstill. 30th Guards Corps managed to cut the road and railroad from Iykhvi to Narva on February 15 and captured Auvere two days later before being stopped by counterattacks. The amphibious landing on the night of February 13/14 was a minor disaster with only 432 naval infantry reaching land without communications to the Fleet and, therefore, without any supporting fire. A pair of German combat groups would destroy this force over four days of fighting.

On February 14 the STAVKA signaled that Narva must be taken by the end of February 17 "for military as well as political reasons." Fediuninsky now reinforced the southern bridgehead with two more rifle corps, but this made little difference in the face of significant German reinforcements; on February 23 this grouping was named Operational Group Narva, and it would continue to hold through the rest of the winter and the following spring. During the next battle, from February 17–28, the southern bridgehead was expanded, and 43rd Corps was moved to 59th Army toward the end of this period, but Narva was not cut off. By now all of Govorov's forces were considerably weakened, but he called for a concentrated attack on March 1. 43rd and 109th Corps attacked at dawn after a 20-minute artillery preparation, but this was inadequate and the Soviet force struck heavy resistance, especially at Sirgala and Putki. Following powerful counterattacks the fighting would continue on 59th Army's front until April 8 in a bloody stalemate. The 131st was recognized on March 22 for its successes earlier in the campaign with the Order of the Red Banner. At about the same time 43rd Corps was reassigned to 8th Army.

Leningrad Front went over to the defense on April 12, but on April 19 the III SS Panzer and LIV Army Corps launched Operation Narva following a 30-minute artillery preparation, in an effort to retake the Auvere bridgehead, defended by 8th Army. While the Army commander, Lt. Gen. F. N. Starikov, claimed to have beaten back 17 separate attacks on this first day, in the five days of fighting that followed his forces were pushed out of a sector from Auvere Station to Vanamyiza. Govorov was sufficiently impressed that he began construction of a new reserve line, and suspended operations in the Narva sector until July. By the beginning of May the 131st and its 43rd Corps were back in 2nd Shock Army. During July it was assigned to that Army's 124th Rifle Corps.

The final battle for Narva began on July 25. One of the first boats to cross the river near the village of Torvala contained Jr. Lt. Andrei Semyonovich Yukhanov, commander of a rifle platoon in the 2nd Company of the 593rd Rifle Regiment. Despite being wounded while embarking he stayed with his platoon; when the boat was destroyed mid-stream he swam to the west bank and led a charge of the first German trench. During the attack on the second trench he was wounded again but carried on to the third. He was credited with killing 16 German soldiers, largely with grenades. He was finally ordered to the rear by his regimental commander, who would nominate him as a Hero of the Soviet Union on July 28. Yukhanov succumbed to his wounds in a field hospital on September 20. On March 24, 1945, he posthumously received his Gold Star. After Narva fell the four regiments of the 131st all received its name as a battle honor:

NARVA... 482nd Rifle Regiment (Lt. Colonel Kurushin, Pyotr Nikolaevich)... 593rd Rifle Regiment (Lt. Colonel Kononenko, Andrei Antonovich), 743rd Rifle Regiment (Lt. Colonel Ivanov, Ignatii Ilich)... 409th Artillery Regiment (Lt. Colonel Pudov, Grigorii Eliseevich)... By order of the Supreme High Command of 27 July 1944, and a commendation in Moscow, the troops that participated in the liberation of Narva are given a salute of 20 salvoes by 224 guns.

By this time the summer offensive against Army Group Center was well underway and Soviet forces were deep into Latvia and Lithuania, leaving Army Group North no alternative to withdrawing from Estonia.

== Tallinn Offensive and Moonsund Operation ==
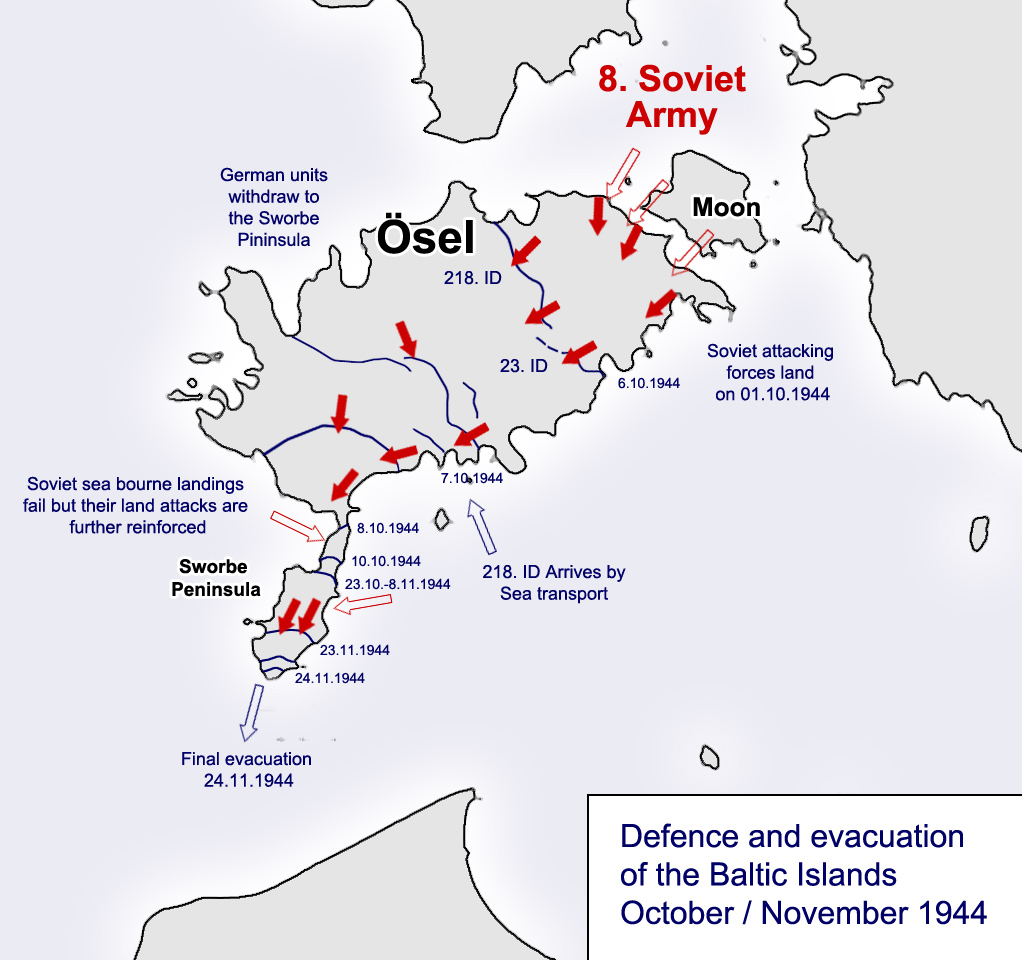
Moonsund Operation

During August the division was moved again, now to 117th Rifle Corps, but the next month it made its final reassignment to 8th Army's 109th Corps, joining the 72nd and 109th Rifle Divisions. Finland exited the war on September 3, removing most of the rationale for Army Group North to remain in Estonia. The offensive to take Tallinn began on September 17 and the Estonian capital was abandoned by German forces on September 22 as part of an orderly retreat that Leningrad Front was unable to disrupt.

General Starikov had just a week to organize the amphibious invasion of the Baltic islands at the mouth of the Gulf of Riga. His force consisted of the 109th Corps and the 8th Estonian Rifle Corps, backed by the Baltic Fleet with several brigades of marines, and the 13th Air Army, for a total of about 30,000 troops and more than 130 ships. The amphibious landings would make extensive use of Lend-Lease DUKWs and Ford GPAs. At the start the islands were defended by some 12,000 men of the 23rd Infantry Division and 40 ships, but reinforcements in the form of the 218th Infantry and 12th Luftwaffe Field Divisions arrived after the 8th Army's landings began, effectively bringing manpower to par. The campaign began on September 27 with the landing of a single battalion of marines on Vormsi. Landings followed on Muhu two days later, led by a special forces detachment of 950 men, followed by about 5,000 more over the next 24 hours. The next target was Hiiumaa, with landings beginning on the morning of October 2 in the face of heavy fire. By mid-afternoon the surviving defenders had evacuated to Saaremaa. Here the fighting became prolonged as the German reinforcements arrived. Beginning on October 5 the initial defenses were breached but the combined German forces fell back to the well-fortified Sõrve Peninsula, joined to the main island by a peninsula just 2.5 km wide. Repeated attacks in early October failed, and the situation only changed after Riga was taken on October 13, forcing German shipping to abandon the Gulf. The Irben defense line was broken on November 18 and the last German troops evacuated on November 24.

== Postwar ==
When the shooting stopped the division was still in 109th Corps of 8th Army, with the full title of 131st Rifle, Ropsha, Order of the Red Banner Division. (Russian: 131-я стрелковая Ропшинская Краснознамённая дивизия.) Leningrad Front reverted to Leningrad Military District, and by the beginning of October the division had been reassigned to 7th Guards Rifle Corps of 10th Guards Army and was stationed on Saaremaa. During 1946-1947 it was gradually disbanded. General Romanenko had left his command on May 8, 1946, to take command of the 29th Guards Rifle Division and then the 8th Guards Motor Rifle Division before moving to the educational establishment in December 1948. In February 1954 he was given command of the 9th Rifle Corps and was promoted to lieutenant general in May. After more than two years in this post he returned to instructing, and retired in December 1961.
