= Nikolai Vashugin =

Soviet general and political officer

- Born: April 18, 1900; Zaruchie, contemporary Yaroslavl Oblast, Russian Empire
- Died: June 28, 1941 (aged 41); Ternopol, Ukrainian SSR, Soviet Union
- Military career
- Allegiance: Soviet Union
- Service years: 1919–1941
- Rank: Corps Commissar (equivalent to Lieutenant General)
- Conflicts: Russian Civil War; Soviet-Finnish War; World War II; Battle of Brody †
- Awards: Order of Lenin; Jubilee Medal "XX Years of the Workers' and Peasants' Red Army"

Nikolai Nikolaevich Vashugin (Russian: Николай Николаевич Вашугин; April 18 [O.S. April 5] 1900 – June 28, 1941) was a Soviet general and a political officer.

== Biography ==
=== Early life ===
Born in the village of Zaruchie, Vashugin joined the Red Army in 1919 and took part in the Russian Civil War. He became a political instructor by 1920. At 1933, he graduated from the Frunze Academy.

=== Interwar years ===
Vashugin had reportedly played an active part in the Great Purge, informing on several of his acquaintances and demonstrating "political zeal". At 1937, he underwent advanced officers' training. In 1938, holding the rank of a regimental commissar, he was rapidly promoted to divisional commissar and posted as the Leningrad Military District's Member of the Military Council – the district's supervising political officer.

After the Soviet invasion of Finland, Vashugin was designated Member of the Military Council in Kiril Meretskov's 7th Army on 9 December 1939 and given the rank of corps commissar. He was given the same role in 15th Army on 7 January 1940, and remained there until the end of the war. Afterwards, he served as Member of Military Council in the Arkhangelsk Military District. On 16 November, Vashugin was assigned to the Special Kiev Military District in the same capacity.

=== World War II ===
On 22 June 1941, as Germany invaded the Soviet Union, the Kiev District – commanded by Mikhail Kirponos – was reformed to create the Soviet Southwestern Front.

At 2300 the same day, a Stavka directive issued from Moscow ordered Kirponos to launch a counter-offensive towards Lublin on the 23rd. While the front's chief-of-staff General Maksim Purkayev argued that its forces were unable to attack and should retreat, Vashugin claimed that a passive defense would damage morale. Eventually, Kirponos convinced his political officer that a less ambitious operation would commence on the early hours of the 24th.

Soon after, Marshal Georgy Zhukov and Nikita Khrushchev arrived, demanding to attack as soon as possible. By the 25th, Kirponos' poorly organized forces engaged the enemy near Dubno and Brody in a hasty counter-offensive. On the 27th, Vashugin toured the front himself, and encountered General Dmitry Ryabyshev's 8th Mechanized Corps, which was ordered to retreat its positions by the front's headquarters in the night. Vashugin ordered the disorganized force to attack at once, threatening to have its commander shot. As the disorganized unit was unable to attack in full strength before the next day, Vashugin instructed its commissar, Nikolai Popel, to take over the available force and head on, while Ryabyshev would gather reinforcements. Although the 8th Corps managed to capture Dubno for a short while, it was encircled and destroyed soon after. When he heard of this, Vashugin committed suicide in the front's command post. Khrushchev later claimed that Vashugin approached him, told him that "all is lost ... It would end as it had in Poland and France" and shot himself in front of his eyes.
