= Battle of Moscow (film) =

1985 Soviet film

- A poster of the film.
- Directed by: Yuri Ozerov
- Screenplay by: Yuri Ozerov
- Produced by: Anatoly Raskazov
- Starring: Mikhail Ulyanov
- Narrated by: Vyacheslav Tikhonov
- Cinematography: Igor Chernykh, Vladimir Gusev
- Edited by: Svetlana Metelitsa
- Music by: Aleksandra Pakhmutova
- Production companies: Mosfilm; DEFA-Babelsberg; Barrandov Studios; Fafim
- Release date: 1 November 1985
- Running time: 358 minutes (combined); Film I(1): 91 minutes Film I(2): 88 minutes Film II(1): 90 minutes Film II(2): 89 minutes
- Countries: Soviet Union; East Germany; Czechoslovakia; Vietnam
- Languages: Russian, German

The Battle of Moscow (Russian: Битва за Москву, Bitva za Moskvu) is a 1985 Soviet two-part war film, presenting a dramatized account of the Battle of Moscow during the Second World War, and the events preceding it. The two-part film was a Soviet–East German–Czechoslovak–Vietnamese co-production, directed and written by Yuri Ozerov. It was made in time for the 40th anniversary of the Allied victory over Nazi Germany and the 20th anniversary of the proclamation of the Victory Day holiday and Moscow's declaration as a Hero City.

== Plot ==
=== Film I: Aggression ===
==== Part 1 ====
In the aftermath of the victory in France, Hitler decides to attack the Soviet Union and places his hopes on field marshal Fedor von Bock, commander of Army Group Center, for the capture of Moscow. Ilse Stöbe, Rudolf von Scheliha and Richard Sorge inform of the danger, but the Soviet intelligence dismisses their warnings. Zhukov is concerned that the army is ill-prepared; Pavlov decries him as a fear-monger. The Red Army officers are convinced that in the event of an invasion, they would immediately counter-attack. On 22 June 1941 Germany launches Operation Barbarossa, overwhelming the Soviets.

==== Part 2 ====
The Red Army tries to counter the assault with a string of hasty operations, while the Brest Fortress is desperately defended. The Soviets manage to recapture Yelnya, but Lieutenant General L.G. Petrovsky is killed in action. Stalin insists on defending Kiev, and his forces suffer immense losses.

=== Film II: Typhoon ===
==== Part 1 ====
The Wehrmacht plans to attack Moscow. Hitler calls the plan Operation Typhoon. Richard Sorge finds out that Japan won't attack the USSR in 1941. The Germans approach the Soviet capital, winning the Battle at Borodino Field and breaching the Mozhaisk line. Stalin decides to remain in Moscow.

==== Part 2 ====
The enemy is at the outskirts of the city, yet the traditional 7 November parade takes place as always. Zoya Kosmodemyanskaya is captured and executed, and Panfilov's men fight to the last. Rokossovsky begs Zhukov to allow retreat but is refused. After all seems lost, the Germans grind to a halt because of the harsh winter. On 6 December, the Soviets launch a successful counter-offensive by using the air force, the cavalry, tanks, and ski troops. The Germans are forced to retreat, causing Hitler to blame his generals.

== Production ==
Battle of Moscow was director Ozerov's third film dealing with the Second World War, after the five-part Liberation (1970) and the TV mini-series Soldiers of Freedom (1977). Ozerov was not allowed to deal with the early, dark chapters of the war in Liberation due to political pressure, and Soldiers of Freedom revolved around the battles outside the Soviet Union. For the 40th year to the victory over Germany, Ozerov intended to create a film about the first stages on the war, from the beginning of the invasion on 22 June 1941 until the Wehrmacht's defeat near Moscow.

Unlike Liberation, Ozerov's most acclaimed work, Battle of Moscow was a purely historical film, with no fictional characters included in the plot. The actors selected to portray the main roles were mostly ones who already appeared as such in the director's earlier works, especially Mikhail Ulyanov who depicted Zhukov in all of Ozerov's films. Eventually, the production involved a crew of some six thousand people.

The German-speaking actors were contacted through DEFA, while the scenes involving Richard Sorge were shot in Vietnam with the assistance of the Fafim studio. Marshal Sergei Rudenko served as the chief military consultant of the movie; the battle scenes involved troops from the Red Army as extras. The filming of the open-door battle scenes took place in Czechoslovakia, but the urban combat was shot in Moscow itself: buildings in the wrecked parts of the city were demolished with explosives to simulate bomber attacks.

The film premiered in the Moscow Film Festival.

== Reception ==
Yuri Ozerov won the Grand Prize in the 1986 Alma Ata All-Union Film Festival for his work on the film, as well as the Alexander Dovzhenko Golden Medal.

Russian film critic Alexander Fedorov called the movie "a large-scale war production typical of Yuri Ozerov" which presents Stalin as a wise leader, and depicts Zhukov as a brilliant general. Fedorov also commented on the battle scenes, describing them as "impressive... involving tanks, airplanes and artillery."

== Cast ==
- Yakov Tripolski as Joseph Stalin
- Anatoly Nikitin as Mikhail Kalinin
- Nikolai Zasukhin as Vyacheslav Molotov
- Vyacheslav Ezepov as Alexander Shcherbakov
- Vladimir Troshin as Kliment Voroshilov
- Stepan Mikoyan as Anastas Mikoyan
- Evgeni Novikov as Nikolay Shvernik
- Achim Petri as Adolf Hitler
- Olegar Fedoro as People's Commisar
- Rostislav Yankovsky as General Vasily Smirnov
- Mikhail Ulyanov as Marshal Georgy Zhukov
- Aleksandr Filippenko as General Dmitry Pavlov
- Bruno Freindlich as Marshal Boris Shaposhnikov
- Yury Yakovlev as General Leonid Petrovsky
- Juozas Budraitis as Richard Sorge
- Aleksandr Goloborodko as General Konstantin Rokossovsky
- Vitali Rozstalnoi as Marshal Semyon Timoshenko
- Emanuil Vitorgan as Commissar Yefim Fomin
- Leonid Kulagin as General Maksim Purkayev
- Lev Pregunov as General Lev Dovator
- Gennadi Saifulin as General Dmitry Lelyushenko
- Irina Shemliova as Zoya Kosmodemyanskaya
- Irina Gubanova as Zoya's mother
- Konstantin Stepankov as General Ivan Panfilov
- Gennadi Frolov as General Timofei Orlenko
- Nikolai Ivanov as Colonel Victor Polosukhin
- Victor Zozulin as General Mikhail Katukov
- Vasily Korzun as General Dmitry Ryabyshev
- Nikolai Kryuchkov as old man in Vyazma
- Oleg Stefan as Lieutenant Manchich
- Leonid Evtifiev as General Vasily Sokolovsky
- Aleksandr Voevodin as Commissar Vasily "Diev" Kluchkov
- Piotr Glebov as Marshal Semyon Budyonny
- Nikolai Volkov as General Mikhail Kirponos
- Aleksandr Martinov as General Ivan Kopetz
- Boris Scherbakov as General Mikhail Romanov
- Valeri Yurchenko as Commissar Nikolai Popel
- Romualds Ancāns as Major Pyotr Gavrilov
- Vladimir Kuznetsov as General Nikolai Vashugin
- Boris Guasakov as General Dmitriy Ustinov
- Yuri Gusev as General Vladimir Klimovskikh
- Mikk Mikiver as General Ivan Konev
- Valeri Karen as General Hovhannes Bagramyan
- Joachim Tomaschewsky as Field Marshal Hans von Kluge
- Erik Veldre as General Heinz Guderian
- Gerd Michael Henneberg as Field Marshal Wilhelm Keitel
- Ernst Heise as Field Marshal Fedor von Bock

== Soundtrack ==
Aleksandra Pakhmutova made the music and the movie soundtrack. The movie's theme song "You're my hope, you're my joy" was composed by her and Nikolai Dobronranov, and was sung by Lev Leshchenko.

== See also ==
- Moscow Strikes Back
