= 35th Tank Division =

35th Tank Divison
- 35-я танковая дивизия
- Active: March 1941 - September 9 1941
- Country: Soviet Union
- Allegiance: Red Army
- Branch: Army
- Type: Tank
- Garrison/HQ: Novograd-Volynsky
- Engagements: Battle of Brody; Battle of Kyiv (1941)

Commanders
- Commander: Nikolai Novikov

The 35th Tank Division (Russian: 35-я танковая дивизия) was a Soviet tank division during the Second World War.

== History ==
The 35th Tank Division was formed in March 1941 in the Kiev Military District. At the time of the invasion of the Soviet Union by the armed forces of the Third Reich and its allies, it was assigned to the 9th Mechanized Corps.

Following the start of Operation Barbarossa, the division fought in Western Ukraine and the Battle of Brody. Between 27 June and early July, it launched repeated counterattacks toward Mlyniv, defended positions around Klevan, and helped slow the advance of the III Army Corps. Although these attacks failed to recapture key areas, they forced German units to divert forces northward, easing pressure on neighboring Soviet formations. The division also suffered frequent German air attacks and heavy losses.

Throughout late July and August, the 35th Tank Division participated in defensive operations around Malyn, conducting counterattacks that delayed German advances and helped cover the withdrawal of other Soviet units. However, constant combat steadily reduced its strength. By 14 August 1941, the division had been reduced to 927 personnel.

During the fighting withdrawal, the division suffered heavy casualties and lost all of its tanks. By 19 August 1941, the division had been reduced to only 927 people and was disbanded on 9 September 1941. Its tank crews were transferred to the rear and incorporated into newly formed military units, while Colonel Novikov was appointed commander of the 3rd Tank Brigade.

== Equipment ==
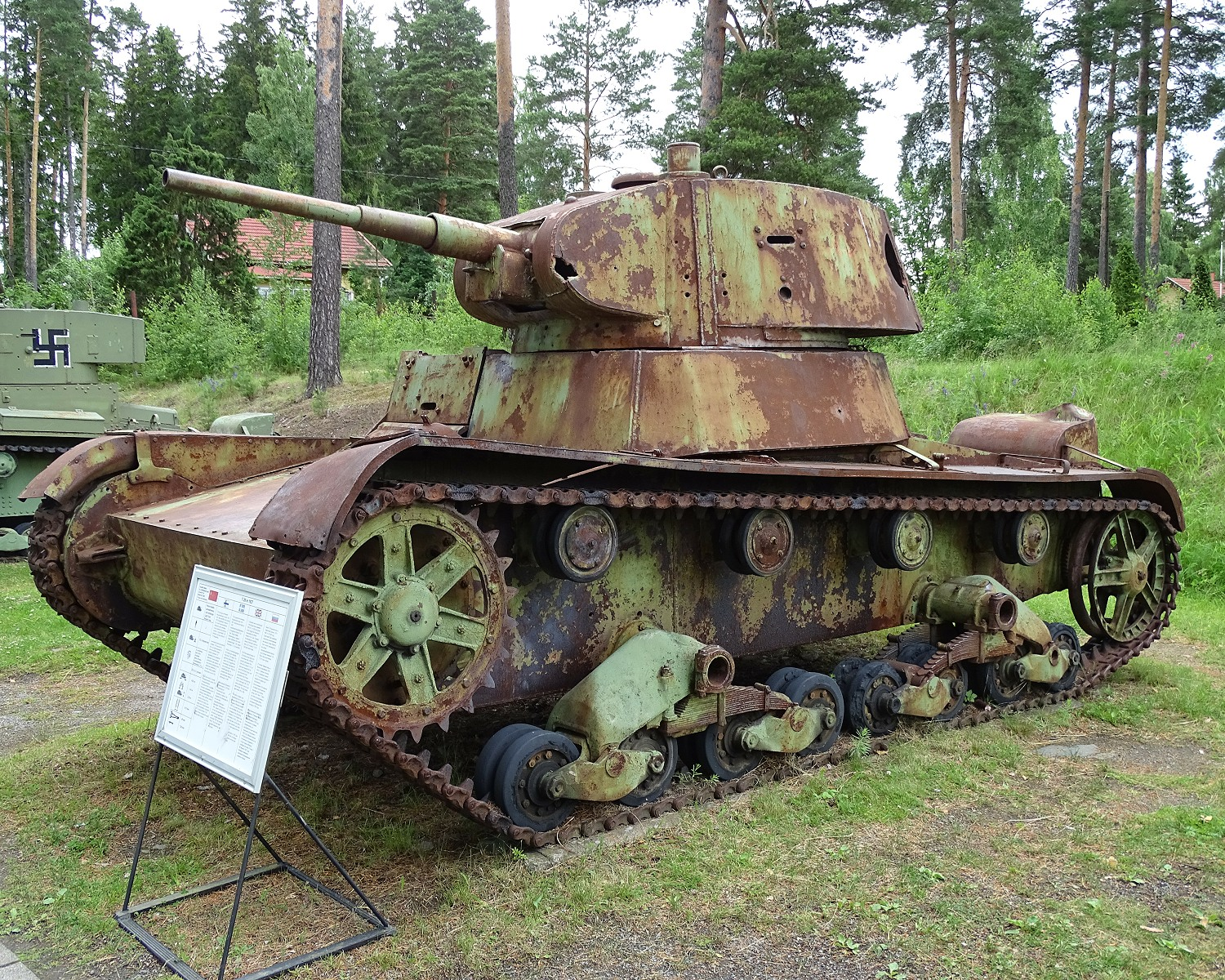
The T-26 tank.

Despite belonging to a mechanized corps established in 1940, the division and the corps as a whole was poorly equipped. On 22 June 1941, the 35th Tank Division possessed 142 mostly obsolete T-26 light tanks, one flame-thrower tank, limited artillery, only 188 trucks, and just 7 tractors. The corps had received none of the modern tanks planned before the war.

== Commanders ==
- Colonel Nikolai Novikov.

== Organization ==
- 69th Armored Regiment.
- 70th Armored Regiment.
- 35th Motorized Infantry Regiment.
- 35th Howitzer Regiment.
