= Nikolai Popel =

Nikolai Kirillovich Popel (Russian: Никола́й Кири́ллович По́пель; 1901–1980) was a Lieutenant-General of the eighth Soviet tank corps and political commissar in the Red Army during World War II.

During the Battle of Brody in the summer of 1941, he successfully attacked the German rear, cutting off the supply lines for the 11th Panzer Division and capturing Dubno.

He is featured as a character in the 1985 Soviet film Battle of Moscow, in which he is portrayed by Valeri Yurchenko.

== See also ==
- Battle of Brody (1941)
- Battle of Moscow (film)
