= 9th Mechanized Corps =

9th Mechanized Corps (1st Formation: 1940–1941) 9th Mechanized Corps (2nd Formation: 1943–1945) 9th Mechanized Division (1945–1957) 82nd Motor Rifle Division (1957–1958)
- Active: 1940–1941 (1st Formation); 1943–1958 (2nd formation)
- Country: Soviet Union
- Branch: Red Army / Soviet Army
- Type: Mechanized
- Size: Corps/Division
- Engagements: World War II; First Battle of Kiev; Battle of the Dnieper; Second Battle of Kiev; Dnieper-Carpathian Offensive; Zhitomir-Berdichev Offensive; Lvov-Sandomierz Offensive; Battle of Berlin; Prague Offensive
- Decorations: Order of the Red Banner (2nd formation); Order of Suvorov, 2nd class (2nd formation); Order of Kutuzov, 2nd class (2nd formation)
- Battle honours: Kiev (2nd formation); Zhitomir (2nd formation)

Commanders
- Notable commanders: Konstantin Rokossovsky; Ivan Sukhov

The 9th Mechanized Corps was a mechanized corps of the Soviet Red Army, formed twice. It was first formed in November 1940 and disbanded in September 1941 after suffering heavy losses. The corps was formed again in August 1943 at Tula. The second formation fought with the 3rd Guards Tank Army. It participated in the Battle of the Dnieper, the Battle of Kiev (1943), the Dnieper–Carpathian Offensive, the Zhitomir–Berdichev Offensive, the Lvov–Sandomierz Offensive. the Battle of Berlin and the Prague Offensive. During the war the corps received the honorifics "Kiev" and "Zhitomir" and was awarded the Order of the Red Banner, the Order of Suvorov 2nd class, and the Order of Kutuzov 2nd class.

== First formation ==
The corps was first formed in November 1940 in the Kiev Military District with the 19th and 20th Tank Divisions, and the 131st Motorized Division. In March 1941, the 19th Tank Division was transferred to the 22nd Mechanized Corps and was replaced by the 35th Tank Division.

On June 22, 1941, the first day of the German invasion, orders went out from headquarters Southwestern Front under Mikhail Kirponos to the mechanized corps to deploy forward as quickly as possible. The 9th Mechanized Corps moved its units towards the town of Lutsk, into the path of the advancing 14th Panzer Division, which pushed the 131st Motorized Division out of the town. Meanwhile, south of Lutsk, the 11th Panzer Division secured Dubno, a vital road hub, against minimal resistance, and Kirponos ordered an immediate counter-attacked to retake it. Although still in the process of moving forward towards the battle zone, both the 20th and 35th assembled forward detachments of between 30 and 40 tanks together with what infantry was to hand, and launched them forward, cutting the Lutsk-Dubno road.

At the same time, elements of 19th Mechanized Corps' 43rd Tank Division recaptured Dubno. The German reaction was swift; the next day, June 26, the 13th Panzer Division struck down from Lutsk, catching the 9th Mechanized forward detachments in the flank, rolling them up and sending then reeling back, whilst German infantry opened up the 11th Panzer supply rout by recapturing Dubno. The 13th Panzer turned east, and along secondary roads, took Rovno in the 9th's Mechanized rear.

However, on June 29, the 14th Panzer, attempting to advance eastward along the main tank highway, was stopped cold by the 20th Tank Division, and was just able to hold Lutsk against "massive attacks". The corps commander, Konstantin Rokossovsky, later wrote of this engagement in his memoirs, "The terrain off road was wooded and swampy, keeping the German advance to the road. The artillery Regiment of the 20th Tank Division deployed its newly issued 85mm Guns to cover the road and with direct fire repulsed the advancing Panzers". The 14th Panzer abandoned this route and followed the 13th Panzer Division. Both Panzer divisions of III Panzer Corps pushed on, leaving 25th Panzergrenadier Division to protect their rear against repeated attacks by 9th Mechanized Corps to drive into Rovno. The 25th Panzergrenadier Division reported extreme difficulty in holding back the attacks and suffered "serious losses" in the process.

By the beginning of July, German armor had smashed a hole in the center of the Russian line, and the 13th Panzer stood at the edge of the Kiev fortified district. In another attempt to restore the front, Kirponos ordered attacks from the 5th Army in the north and 6th Army in the south to accomplish this aim. The army still had three mechanized corps under command: the 9th, the 19th, and the 22nd. The 5th Army forces lunged southward and managed to cut the Zhitomir – Kiev highway, blocking III Panzer Corps' supply lines. The Germans reacted by assigning infantry to clear the road and push the Russians back to the north. On the 9th of July, the corps was still in the Kiev Special Military District as part of the General reserve.

September 20, 1941 from the remnants of the 9th Mechanized Corps of the 5th Army was formed a combined battalion, who joined in the 15th Mechanized Corps.

== Second formation ==
The 9th Mechanized Corps formed again in August 1943 at Tula. Its main sub units were the 69th, 70th, and 71st mechanized brigades. The new corps advanced to the Dnieper River and then fought at Fastov and around Kiev in November 1943, and Zhitomir in January 1944.

The corps now formed a component of 3rd Guards Tank Army, and fought under its command for the remainder of the war. In April, it was withdrawn for three months rest and retraining before attacking again in the Soviet push to capture Lviv. In January 1945, the corps fought in the Vistula and Oder battles in eastern Germany, and finally in the Battle of Berlin in May 1945.

It later became 9th Mechanised Division, then 82nd Motor Rifle Division on 17 May 1957. It was based at Cottbus until 1958. It was disbanded on 9 May 1958 in the GSFG at Bernau with the 18th Guards Army (the former 3rd Guards Tank Army).

== Composition ==
The early war corps tank component was massive on paper, but the 9th Mechanized was well below its authorized strength and lacked the latest modern designs that some of the other mechanized units had begun to receive. The 20th Tank Division in particular had only 32 tanks instead of 375, and the corps as a whole 300 instead of 1031. Its most common equipment was the T26 and the BT models. In terms of command and control, personnel training, communications and logistical support, the mechanized corps were not suited to conduct, sustain or survive in the high intensity combat operations of the early conflict The Wehrmacht decimated the mechanized corps in the first month of the war, destroying over 1000 tanks, so that by mid August the Stavka abolished the remaining corps.

Equipment on 22 June 1941
	Corps as a whole	T-37	T-26	BT-5 & BT-7	other
Corps	300				
20 Tank Div.	36	0	3	30	3
35 Tank Div.	142	0	141	0	1
131 Mot, Div.	122	18	0	104	0

== Awards and honorary titles ==
- Kiev (Stavka order of 10.03.1943);
- Zhytomyr (Stavka Order of 01.01.1944);
- Order of the Red Banner (Decree of the Presidium of the USSR Supreme Council of 03.04.1944) — for conduct in the Kamenets-Podolsky pocket;
- Order of Suvorov II degree (Decree of the Presidium of the USSR Supreme Council of 10.08.1944) — for conduct in the Lvov–Sandomierz Offensive;
- Order of Kutuzov II degree (Decree of the Presidium of the Supreme Soviet of 04.06.1945) —for conduct in the Battle of Berlin.
