= Mayorovsky =

Mayorovsky Майоровский
- Khutor
- Location within Volgograd Oblast Location within Russia
- Coordinates: 49°02′N 43°00′E
- Country: Russia
- Region: Volgograd Oblast
- District: Kletsky District
- Time zone: UTC+4:00

Mayorovsky (Russian: Майоровский) is a rural locality (a khutor) in Manoylinskoye Rural Settlement, Kletsky District, Volgograd Oblast, Russia. The population was 82 as of 2010.

== Geography ==
Mayorovsky is located on the Krepkaya River, 46 km northeast of Kletskaya (the district's administrative centre) by road. Manoylin is the nearest rural locality.
