= Battle of Brody (1941) =

World War II tank battle between the Wehrmacht and the Red Army from 23 to 30 June 1941

Coordinates: 50.08314°N 25.147651°E

- Part of the Eastern Front of World War II
- Movements of the 11th Panzer Division during the Battle of Brody
Date	23–30 June 1941
Location	Brody, Ukrainian SSR, Soviet Union
Result	German victory

Belligerents
Germany	Soviet Union

Commanders and leaders
(Nazi Germany) Ewald von Kleist (Nazi Germany) Hyazinth Graf Strachwitz	(Soviet Union) Mikhail Kirponos (Soviet Union) Maksim Purkayev (Soviet Union) Nikolai Vashugin † (Soviet Union) Ivan Muzychenko (Soviet Union) Mikhail Potapov

Units involved
(Nazi Germany) 1st Panzer Group; (Nazi Germany) III Corps; (Nazi Germany) XLVIII Corps; (Nazi Germany) XIV Corps	(Soviet Union) Southwestern Front; (Soviet Union) 4th M. Corps; (Soviet Union) 8th M. Corps; (Soviet Union) 9th M. Corps; (Soviet Union) 15th M. Corps; (Soviet Union) 19th M. Corps; (Soviet Union) 22nd M. Corps

Strength
750 tanks	3,500 tanks

Casualties and losses
	Heavy (forces rendered non-operational)

The Battle of Brody (other names in use include Battle of Dubna, Battle of Dubno, Battle of Rovne, Battle of Rovne-Brody) was a tank battle fought between the 1st Panzer Group's III Army Corps and XLVIII Army Corps (Motorized) and five mechanized corps of the Soviet 5th Army and 6th Army in the triangle formed by the towns of Dubno, Lutsk and Brody between 23 and 30 June 1941. It was one of the most intense armored engagements in the opening phase of Operation Barbarossa, and some say that it may surpass the more famous Battle of Prokhorovka. It is by far the battle with the largest number of tanks participating (incorrectly, the Battle of Prokhorovka, part of the Battle of Kursk, is seen as the biggest tank battle). It is known in Soviet historiography as one of the "border defensive battles". Although the Red Army formations inflicted heavy losses on the German forces, they were outmanoeuvred and suffered enormous losses in tanks. Poor Soviet logistics, German air supremacy and a total breakdown in Red Army command and control ensured victory for the Wehrmacht despite overwhelming Red Army numerical and technological superiority.

== Prelude ==
The 1st Panzer Group, led by Generaloberst Paul Ludwig Ewald von Kleist, was ordered to secure the Bug River crossings and advance to Rovno and Korosten with the strategic objective of Kiev. It deployed two corps forward and advanced between Lviv and Rovno in an attempt to cut the Lviv–Kiev railway line, thus driving a wedge along junction point between the Soviet 5th and 6th Armies.

The Southwestern Front, under the command of General Mikhail Kirponos, had received incomplete intelligence on the size and direction of the German attack. They were surprised when Stavka ordered a general counter-attack under the title of "Directive No. 3" on the authority of Chief of General Staff Georgy Zhukov. Most of the headquarters staff were convinced that the strategy would be to remain in a defensive posture until the situation clarified. Later Hovhannes Baghramyan, a staff officer of the front headquarters who wrote the initial report to Moscow, said that "our first combat report to Moscow was full of generalities and unclear instructions." The general orders of Directive No. 3 read:

While maintaining strong defense of the state border with Hungary, the 5th and 6th armies are to carry out concentric strikes in the direction of Lublin, utilizing at least five mechanized corps and aviation of the Front, in order to encircle and destroy the enemy group of forces advancing along the Vladimir-Volynski-Krystynopol front, and by the end of June 24th to capture the vicinity of Lublin.

By the end of 22 June, Zhukov was on his way to the Southwestern Front headquarters at Ternopil along with Nikita Khrushchev, the former head of the Organizational Department of the Ukrainian Communist Party's Central Committee, to ensure these orders were carried out.

== Disposition of forces ==
Six Soviet mechanized corps, with over 2,500 tanks, were massed to take part in a concentric counter-attack through the flanks of Panzer Group 1. The intention was to later attempt a pincer movement from the north (Soviet 5th Army) and south (6th Army) that met west of Dubno in order to trap units of the 6th and 17th German Armies on the northern flank of Army Group South. To achieve this, the 8th Mechanized Corps was transferred from the command of the 26th Army, positioned to the south of the 6th Army, and placed under the command of Ivan Nikolaevich Muzychenko's 6th Army. This essentially brought all the mobile assets of the Southwestern Front to bear against the base of von Kleist's thrust toward Kiev. The primary German infantry formation operating on this sector of the front, IV Army Corps (von Schwedler) of the 17th Army (Carl-Heinrich von Stülpnagel) were advancing south-east with the objective of cutting the Lviv-Kiev railway line.

=== German armour ===
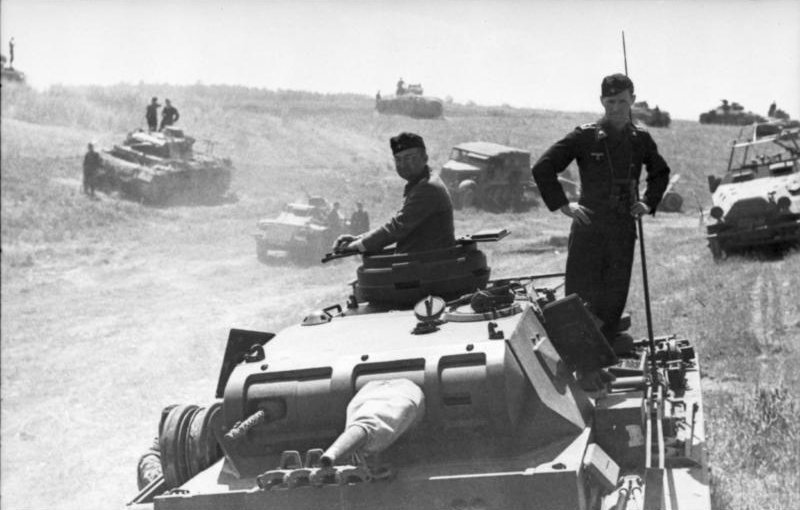
A German Panzer III tank, belonging to the 13th Panzer Division, during the first days of Operation Barbarossa

At the beginning of Operation Barbarossa, German armor was composed of a mix of Czech and German tanks, as well as small numbers of captured French and British tanks. Furthermore, nearly 50% of the tanks deployed by the Wehrmacht were the Panzer I and Panzer II light tanks. Of the 4000 armored vehicles available to the Wehrmacht, only 1400 were the new Panzer III and Panzer IV. In the first few hours of the invasion, German commanders were shocked to find that some Soviet tanks were immune to all anti-tank weapons in use by the Wehrmacht.

During pre-war exercises, Heinz Guderian noted that on their own, tanks were vulnerable to infantry. Furthermore, he also noted that tanks lacked the heavy caliber weapons needed to knock out reinforced concrete bunkers and heavily fortified positions, a role that could only be performed by heavy artillery or air strikes. While dispersing tanks among infantry formations solved many of the tank's weaknesses, it also negated some of their strengths. Therefore, German military theorists concluded that to reach their full potential, armored units needed to be concentrated in their own formations and integrated with mobile artillery, mobile infantry, and close air support.

Lastly, Guderian concluded that in order for tanks to be at their peak effectiveness, all armored vehicles must be equipped with radios so that each tank commander could hear instructions from the unit commander allowing each tank to work with all others in an organized fashion.

=== Soviet armour ===
At the beginning of June, the Red Army included over 19,000 tanks in their inventory, most of them light tanks such as the T-26 or BT-7. The front armor of the T-26 was just 15mm thick, and the BT-7, just 22mm, offering virtually no protection against any anti-tank weapon at any range. Furthermore, the poor design of Soviet shells meant that most rounds shattered on contact, rather than penetrating. More modern tanks, such as the KV-1 and the T-34, were only beginning to roll off production lines and were not available in anywhere near the numbers that were needed to throw back the German advance.

During the interwar years, farsighted military theorists such as Mikhail Tukhachevsky came to similar conclusions as Guderian regarding tanks in modern warfare. However, during the Great Purge Tukhachevsky was executed. Red Army tanks were dispersed widely throughout infantry divisions in the 1930s. Then came the shock of the Fall of France. Surviving armored warfare theorists such as Konstantin Rokossovsky were quickly and quietly reinstated in their positions and began assembling tanks into concentrated formations with all possible speed. However, by June 1941 this process was barely half complete, so many of the 19,000 tanks in the Red Army arsenal were still dispersed among infantry divisions on the eve of the invasion. This ensured that even if the Red Army had a unified command, many of its armored units would be committed piece-meal.

=== German logistics ===
At full strength, a German panzer division was a balanced formation with between 150 and 200 tanks, motorized infantry, motorized artillery, and motorized engineers. To support its logistical needs, each panzer division included 2000 trucks. Furthermore, each panzer division had its own integral artillery and infantry support, which meant that rather than providing a supporting role for infantry, German panzers performed a leading role, with infantry providing support. Furthermore, Wehrmacht training doctrine stressed the need to prepare each man in a vehicle crew to perform roles other than their assigned position, so the vehicle could continue fighting even after the crew suffered casualties. Tank crews were expected to be able to competently perform any role in the tank (loader, driver, gunner, radioman etc.), and were also trained as mechanics, enabling them to make basic repairs and perform routine maintenance on their vehicles in the field.

=== Soviet logistics ===
In the immediate pre-war period, few preparations were made, and the Red Army was at a low level of readiness. Units were not concentrated; ammunition and other supply dumps were neither concealed nor quickly available to combat units. Compounding the problem was that Stalin strictly forbade any Red Army unit from opening fire on reconnaissance patrols, allowing the Germans to easily identify all major targets in the border districts.

Furthermore, Soviet tank crews were not trained on the mechanical details of their machines. That meant that simple mechanical problems resulted in hundreds of Red Army tanks being abandoned on the road side en route to the battle. Those units that did manage to show up at their jumping off points then discovered that the supplies had either been destroyed or moved to another location without updating their locations. After receiving orders to attack and lacking fuel or ammunition, the crews responded by destroying their vehicles and retreating. Hundreds of tanks were lost in this way.

Compounding these logistical difficulties was that each Red Army tank division had 300–400 tanks, but were supported by only 1500 trucks contrasting with a Wehrmacht tank division which had only 150–200 tanks, but 2000 trucks. Experience would prove that the ratio of trucks to tanks favored by the Germans was far more effective.

== Balance of the tank forces ==
On 22 June 1941, the balance of tanks over the entire area of the German Army Group South and the Soviet Southwestern Front, including but not limited to the main battle of Brody, was as follows.

German corps	German divisions	Total German tanks (Note: Total German tanks includes non-combat "commander tanks" as well as outdated Panzer I and Panzer II tanks.)	Tanks with 37 mm cannon (incl. Panzer 38(t) and Panzer III)	Tanks with 50 mm or larger cannon (incl. Panzer III and Panzer IV)
III Panzer Corps	13th, 14th	296	42	140
XXXXVIII Panzer Corps	11th, 16th	289	47	135
XIV Panzer Corps	9th	143	11	80
Any other unit of Army Group South		0	0	0
Total		728	100	355

Soviet corps	Soviet divisions	Total Soviet tanks	T-34 and KV
4th Mechanized Corps	only 8th Tank Division participated	300	100
8th Mechanized Corps	7th	899	171
9th Mechanized Corps	131st	316	0
15th Mechanized Corps	10th, 37th Tank Division; 37th, 212th Rifle Division	749	136
19th Mechanized Corps	40th, 43rd, 213th	453	5
22nd Mechanized Corps	19th, 41st, 215th	712	31
Tanks scattered over various other units	Ordinary rifle divisions, etc.	not incl.	–
Total		3429	443

The figures presented above for Soviet formations are "on hand" totals for those units and do not reflect actual operational vehicle numbers. Even these apparently impressive on-hand numbers are not close to the units' authorized strengths because those organizations were still in the process of being formed and equipped at the time of the invasion. The 15th, 19th, and 22nd Mechanized Corps were only created a few months prior to the start of the war, leaving these formations unprepared, uncoordinated, ill- or untrained, and not ready for effective combat operations. Even the 4th, 8th, and 9th Mechanized Corps had been in existence less than a year at the start of the war. Soviet ill-preparedness, lack of training, and lack of fuel, ammunition, and spare parts assured that actual, operational vehicles were dramatically less in number. Even those that were operational were often not bore-sighted and therefore could not fire accurately, whether ammunition was available or not.

German armoured formations had seen two successful campaigns and three years of war prior to the attack on the Soviet Union, and while some reduction in unit cohesion and effectiveness was caused by the doubling of the number of panzer divisions prior to Operation Barbarossa, this disruption was relatively minor. German armoured units with effective command, control, communication, and plentiful supply (particularly this early in the Soviet campaign), coupled with considerable prior combat experience and extensive training, were more combat effective than their opponents.

== Battle in the air ==
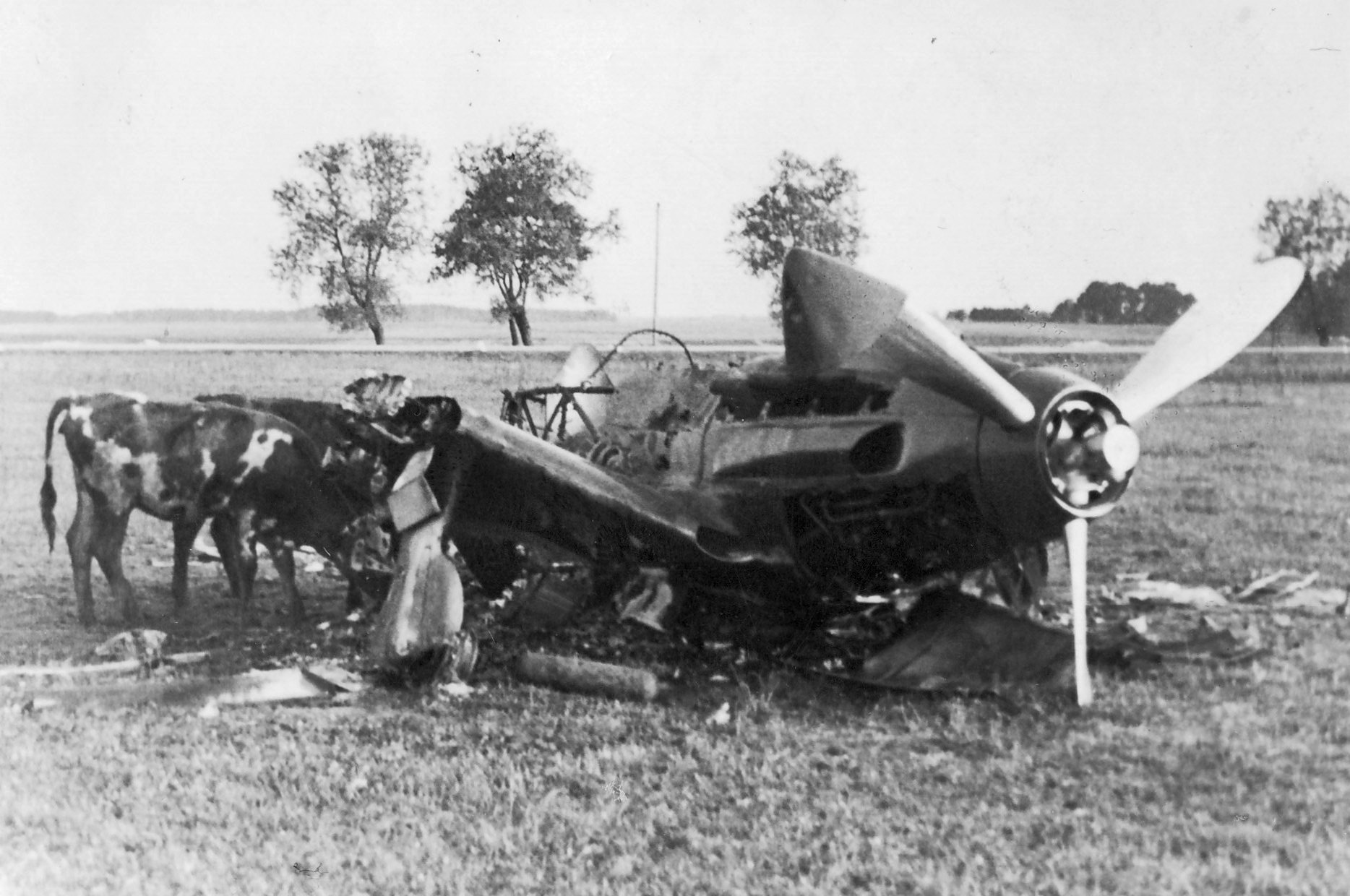
A destroyed Soviet MiG-3 fighter plane during the first days of Operation Barbarossa

The condition of the Soviet Air Force assigned to the Southwestern Front followed the pattern of the entire front line: the majority of its aircraft had been destroyed on the ground as a result of Stalin – disregarding intelligence that a German attack was imminent – refusing to put Soviet forces on alert. For example, Lt. Arkhipenko's 17th Fighter regiment were caught on the ground and almost totally destroyed by the third day of the war. The remainder of the regiment, comprising only ten I-153s and one MiG-1, retreated to a reserve airfield near Rovno. Still, the Soviets sent their surviving aircraft to support the offensive. The Luftwaffe prevented Soviet aerial reconnaissance leaving Soviet commanders blind to a rapidly developing and fast-moving battle.

The air battle resulted in heavy casualties for the attacking Soviets. JG 3, under the command of Fliegerkorps IV, shot down 24 Tupolev SBs on the first day. Among the casualties was the commander of 86 SBAP, Lt.-Col. Sorokin. Just 20 of the initial 251 SBs remained with the unit. German losses were also heavy, with 28 destroyed and 23 damaged aircraft (including 8 He 111s and Ju 88s). The efforts of the Red Army Air force were not without effect, as the Southwestern Front air force flew 523 sorties between 22 June and 24 June, dropping 2,500 bombs. Gustav Shrodek, a tank commander of the 15th Panzer regiment (11th Panzer Division), recorded the scene: "At dawn of 24 June, the regiment underwent its first attack by Russian bombers. It shall not be the only one this day; completely the opposite. As a result of this the regiment now has several dead and wounded." Near total Luftwaffe air superiority was to be a major factor in breaking up the Soviet counter-attack.

== Mobilization ==
The attack combined six mechanized corps under the command of the 5th Army to the north and the 6th Army to the south, under the general direction of Southwestern Front commander Kirponos. Under the 5th Army command, Konstantin Rokossovsky's 9th and Nikolai Vladimirovich Feklenko's 19th Mechanized Corps were to be deployed north-west of Rovno, while the 22nd Mechanized Corps was to assemble northeast of Lutsk. To the south, under the command of the 6th Army, Dmitry Ryabyshev's 8th and Ignat Karpezo's 15th Mechanized Corps were to be deployed to the south-west and north-east of Brody, while the 4th Mechanized Corps under Andrey Vlasov was to be deployed between Sokal and Radekhiv, on the left flank of the 15th Mechanized Corps. The plan called for these forces to assemble and begin offensive operations at 22:00 on 23 June, 36 hours after the initial German onslaught, in an attempt to catch the attackers off guard, and before they could solidify their position by bringing up reinforcements from the rear in support of their fast-advancing 11th Panzer Division.

Conditions were difficult for the Soviet Corps commanders: loss of communications, constant harassment by the Luftwaffe, lack of transportation, and the movement of large numbers of refugees and retreating soldiers on the roads made it difficult for the counter-attacking forces to assemble at their jumping off points. While communication between the Front headquarters and the individual army commands was generally good, communication to the front-line units was seriously flawed, because it was dependent on the civilian telephone and telegraph network. German sappers, air attacks, and Ukrainian nationalist guerrillas had aggressively targeted these systems. Many Soviet front-line commanders were left to their own devices, and this disrupted the effectiveness of Soviet command and control. In one instance, the commander of the 41st Tank Division of the 22nd Mechanized Corps, for want of any new directives, moved his division to the designated assembly point for his corps at Kovel laid out in the pre-war plan, and in so doing, moved his division away from the fighting. Another endemic problem was the lack of transport for the infantry component of the Mechanized Corps. Motorized in name only, many of these divisions had only part of their full transportation establishment. Individual corps commanders had to improvise solutions to bring their full complement of soldiers to their assembly points.

Rokossovsky commandeered 200 trucks from the district reserve at Shepetivka, but this still left him in the position of mounting much of his infantry on tanks. Even then, many soldiers had to walk, since the trucks were carrying critical munitions and supplies. In one case, heavy artillery pieces belonging to the 22nd Mechanized Corps were simply left behind for want of tractors to pull them. The commander of the 19th Mechanized marched his corps forward in two echelons with the tank divisions far in advance of his lagging infantry, which meant that his armored units arrived at the battlefield without infantry support. Ryabyshev, commander of the 8th Mechanized, reported similar problems. His artillery was towed by exceedingly slow tractors that held up the movement of the entire column: "The columns were moving at top speed. Unfortunately, the tractor-towed corps artillery was falling severely behind; the difference in speed was slowing down the overall concentration of forces."

These complications were compounded by the apparent inability of the Soviet commanders to assess an appropriate axis of attack in the context of the rapidly developing German salient. Between 22 June and 24 June, the 8th Mechanized Corps received three different locations for its assembly point: the original order from the Front Command, a new one from the commander of the 6th Army, and on 24 June another order from the Front command. The Corps crossed its own path and backtracked several times before finally arriving at Brody.

Ryabyshev later wrote:

Around the second half of June 25, the Corps' units deployed to the northwest of Brody. During the nearly 500 kilometer march, the Corps lost up to half of its older tanks and a substantial portion of its artillery and anti-tank guns to both enemy air attack and mechanical breakdowns. All of the tanks still in service also required varying degrees of maintenance work and were not capable of operating over long distances. Thus, even before the start of the counteroffensive the Corps found itself in a drastically weakened state.

As a result of these and other problems assembling the forces for the attack, the scheduled time for the operation was set back 6 hours to 04:00 on 24 June. By the time this decision was made on the evening 23 June, barely 48 hours since the war had begun, the 11th Panzer Division, with the 16th Panzer Division traveling in its wake, had already penetrated 40 miles (64 km) into Soviet territory. The 13th and 14th Panzer Divisions were well on their way up the road to Lutsk with the objective of reaching the Styr River on the 24th, and the 44th, 298th, and 299th Infantry Divisions were moving up to consolidate the advance. Even with the delayed schedule, the counter-attack began piecemeal, since the full complement of forces could not be brought into position until two days later. The 4th, 8th, 9th, and 19th Mechanized Corps were still on the march and supporting infantry corps were even further away. Kirponos's Chief of Staff, General Maksim Purkayev, argued against the political officer attached to the Southwest Front, Commissar Nikolai Vashugin, on this point but Vashugin and Zhukov won out: the attack would begin without delay. Only two tank divisions of 15th Mechanized Corps in the south and a single tank division of 22nd Mechanized Corps in the north were in position to begin the attack on the 24th.

== Soviet counter-attacks ==
Three Soviet formations deployed a potent force of modern T-34 and KV tanks: the 4th, 8th, and 15th Mechanized Corps. The 717 such tanks comprised almost a half of the country's 1,600 production of these two models. Throughout the battles, the scale of the intended operations and the precise role of each corps in the plan were communicated poorly or not at all. Ryabyshev noted that "the Corps battle orders spoke only to its own mission objectives". There was little to no communication between the individual corps to ensure co-ordination.

=== 10th Tank Division ===
The Soviet 10th Tank Division was subordinate to 15th Mechanized Corps. On 22 June 1941, the forward battalions captured Radekhiv from the German infantry, losing two tanks. The next day it faced the German 11th Panzer Division there, destroying 20 German tanks and losing 6 T-34 tanks and 20 BT tanks. It withdrew in an orderly fashion because of a lack of ammunition. On 26 June 1941, the division destroyed 23 German tanks and an infantry battalion near Radekhiv, losing 13 KV and 12 BT-7 tanks.

=== 15th Mechanized Corps ===
Commanded by I. I. Karpezo.

The 15th Mechanized Corps as a whole had 749 tanks, including 136 T-34 and KV tanks. Due to a series of inconsistent orders, the Corps spent the battle moving chaotically in the Radekhiv–Brody–Busk triangle. Except for the two engagements with the 10th Tank Division, its forces were not in combat. On 7 July 1941 it reported in Berezovka (300 kilometres (190 mi) from the former border) with nine per cent of its tanks.

=== 22nd Mechanized Corps ===
Commanded by Major-General S. M. Kondrusev.

On 24 June the 22nd Mechanized Corps attacked towards Voinitsa. On 29 June it reported having only 19 per cent of its former number of tanks. On 1 July one regiment unsuccessfully attacked toward Dubno. On 15 July 1941 the 22nd MC had 4 per cent its tanks remaining. Major General Semyon Kondrusev was killed by a shell during fighting near the village of Aleksandrovska in the Volyn region on June 24, 1941.

==== 41st Tank Division, 22nd Mechanized Corps ====
Thirty-one of this unit's KV tanks, its most effective fighting element, blundered into swampy terrain and were lost.

=== 19th Mechanized Corps ===
Commanded by Major General Nikolay Feklenko.

On 26 June it attacked towards Dubno from the north, but failed to reach it by a few kilometers. On 29 June the corps had 32 tanks remaining out of the original 453.

=== 8th Mechanized Corps ===
Ryabyshev's 8th Mechanized Corps finally arrived on the scene on the 25th. On 26 June 1941, the 8th Mechanized Corps as a whole successfully attacked in the direction of Brody–Berestechko against parts of the German 11th Panzer Division. Despite haphazard arrangements and difficulties, the Soviet attack met with some initial success, catching the Germans on the move and outside their prepared positions, their tanks sweeping aside hastily arranged German anti-tank positions manned by motorcycle troops attached to the 48th Panzer Corps. Later the 8th MC split, with some amalgamating into Nikolai Popel's group and a second force remaining under the command of Ryabyshev.

12th Tank Division

Fifty-six KV and 100 T-34 tanks of this division ran out of fuel and ammunition while attacking near Dubno. Combat operations were forced to a standstill.

==== Popel's group ====
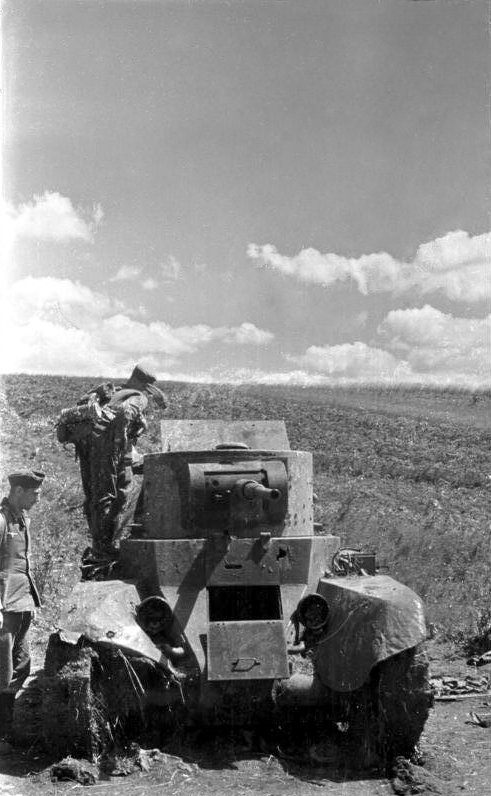
German soldiers examining an abandoned Soviet BT-7 tank

Popel's group had about 300 tanks, including no less than 100 T-34 and KV tanks. On 27 June, Popel's group surprised and defeated the rear of 11th Panzer Division and captured Dubno, a road crossing of strategic importance. This was the most successful Soviet action of the battle, as it cut off supply lines of the German armoured spearhead (the 11th Panzer Division). However, this was not exploited by Soviet command, who failed to communicate with Popel and to provide supplies or reinforcements. The group waited in Dubno and prepared for defence, losing the operational initiative.

The situation was considered "serious" by the German high command:

In the Army Group South sector, heavy fighting continues on the right flank of Panzer Group 1. The Russian 8th Tank Corps has effected a deep penetration of our front and is now in the rear of the 11th Panzer Division. This penetration has seriously disrupted our rear areas between Brody and Dubno. The enemy is threatening Dubno from the southwest ... the enemy also has several separate tank groups acting in the rear of Panzer Group 1, which are managing to cover considerable distances.

— General Franz Halder, diary

By 28 June the Germans had gathered enormous forces. Popel's group came under attack by elements of the 16th Motorized, 75th Infantry Division, two other infantry divisions, and the 16th Panzer Division. Encircled in Dubno, Popel defended until 1 July, when he retreated.

==== Ryabyshev's group ====
Ryabyshev's group had 303 tanks, including 49 T-34 and 46 KV. On 28 June, in an attempt to follow Popel, it met and attacked the German 57th Infantry and 75th Infantry Divisions, as well as elements of 16th Panzer Division. The attack was unsuccessful and the Soviets quickly retreated. On 1 July Ryabyshev reported in Tarnopol with 207 tanks, including 31 T-34 and 43 KV tanks. (Note: Quoting Ryabyshev: "On July 1, 1941, the operational strength of the 8th Mechanized Corps, now comprising the 12th Tank and 7th Motorized Divisions, amounted to 19,000 men, 21 armored cars and 207 tanks, including 43 KVs, 31 T-34s, 69 BT-7s, 57 T-26s and 7 T-40s". These surviving elements were folded into what became Ryabyshev's 38th Army.) With no further combat, the 8th MC moved to Koziatyn, where on 7 July 1941 it had 43 tanks – 5 per cent of the pre-war number.

=== 4th Mechanized Corps ===
The 4th Mechanized Corps commanded by Andrei Vlasov was the strongest in the Ukraine, having 313 T-34 and 101 KV among its total of 979 tanks. It reacted slowly to orders and failed to assemble for attack. The most it achieved was on 28 June, when it secured the retreat of 15th Mechanized Corps from the pushing German infantry. Whilst not attacking or being attacked, the corps reported it retained no more than 6 per cent of its KV tanks, 12 per cent of its T-34 tanks, and 4 per cent of its light tanks on 12 July.

Besides these, there were no more notable Soviet counter-attacks in this battle.

== Decision, indecision, and confusion of command: the historical debate ==
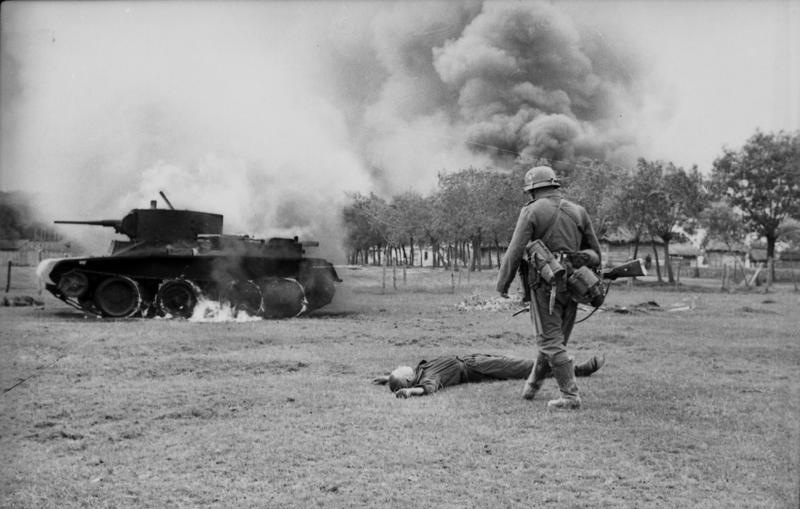
A German infantryman near a burning Soviet BT-5 tank in the distance

The effect of the hesitation and confusion of command on the 27th of June on the outcome of the battle and the German attack into Ukraine is hard to determine.

When the Soviet forces took Dubno and cut off the leading edge of the main German attack, Kirponos thought that the same German attack threatened to outflank and encircle the Soviet forces attacking from the south. This led him to order a halt to the offensive and a general retreat in order to rationalize (shorten) his front line, "so as to prevent the enemy tank groupings from penetrating into the rear of the 6th and 26th Armies", according to H. Baghramyan.

After a debate with the Front commander and his staff, Georgy Zhukov quickly had these orders countermanded; orders for a renewed attack were issued two hours later. This led to even more of the confusion that was symptomatic of the Soviet command at the Battle of Brody. Rokossovsky, who was in command of the 9th Mechanized Corps attacking from the north, simply balked at these new orders, stating that "we had once again received an order to counter-attack. However, the enemy outnumbered us to such a degree, that I took on the personal responsibility of ordering a halt to the counteroffensive and to meet the enemy in prepared defences". Meanwhile, Ryabyshev commanding the 8th Mechanized Corps to the south, complied with the order and remounted the attack.

Ryabyshev seems to take the position held by Zhukov at the time, which is that if the attack had continued aggressively and without delay, the Soviets might have been successful. However, subsequent events seem to vindicate Kirponos's position, which was that the attack was premature and would destabilize the integrity of the entire front. Shortly after the Soviet counter-attack was routed, Marshal Semyon Budyonny was given overall command of the combined Southwestern and Southern Front. Disaster unfolded at the Battle of Uman and 100,000 Soviet soldiers were killed or captured and another 100,000 wounded when three Red Army formations - the 26th, 12th and 18th armies - were encircled after Army Group South renewed its attack by pivoting south from the positions it had achieved during the Battle of Dubno—an outcome that Kirponos had foreshadowed in his arguments with Zhukov about the wisdom of the counter-attack at Dubno.

The confrontation between Kirponos and Zhukov led Zhukov to tell the Southwestern Front political officer, Nikita Khrushchev, "I am afraid your commander (Kirponos) here is pretty weak", a charge that Kirponos would never be able to answer, since he died in the battle of Kiev after it was surrounded.

== Summary ==
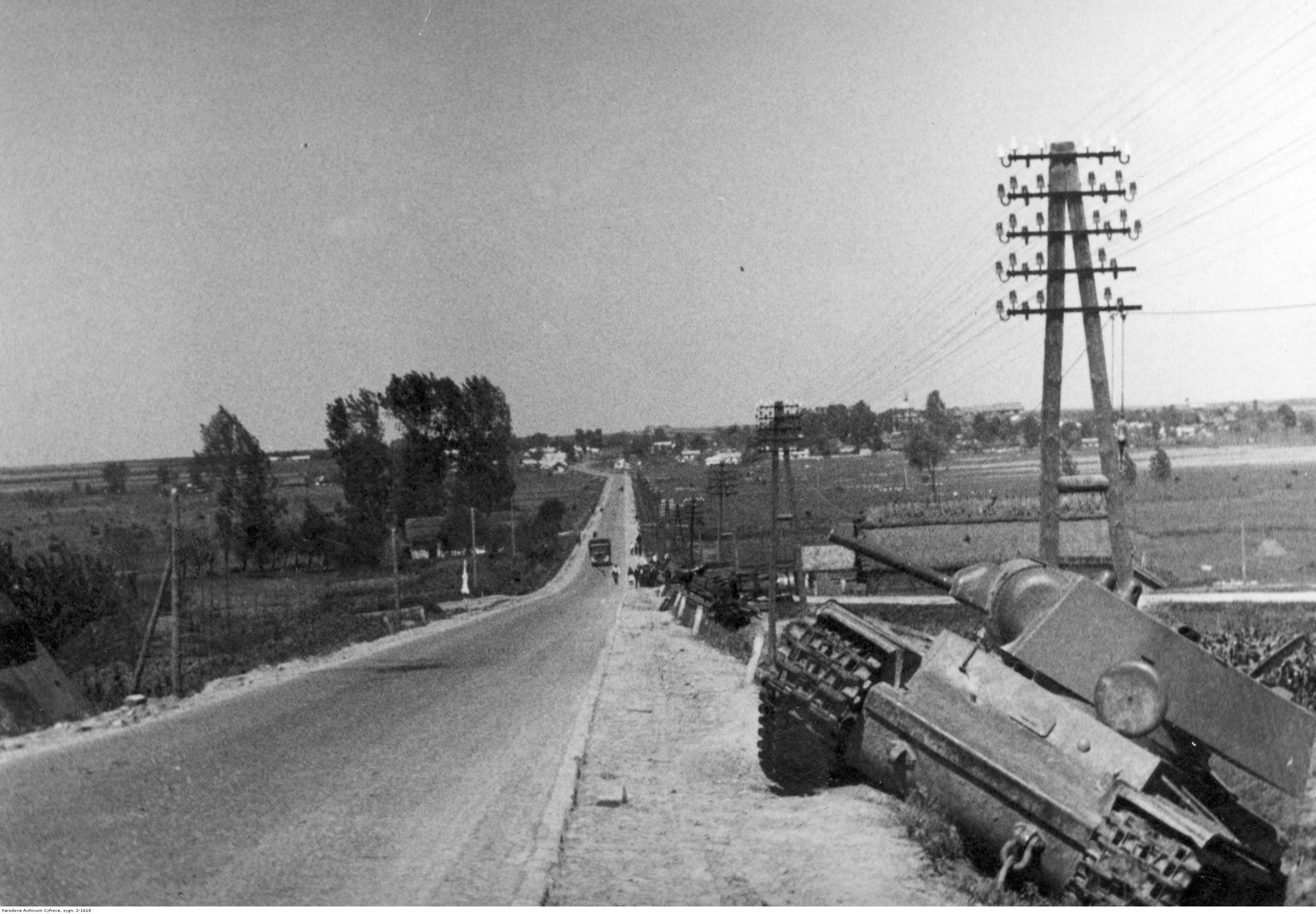
A knocked out KV-1 heavy tank along one of the roads near Lviv, July 1941.

The battle between Panzer Group 1 and the Soviet mechanized corps was the fiercest of the whole invasion, lasting four full days. The Soviets fought furiously, and crews of German tank and anti-tank guns found to their horror that the new Soviet T-34 tanks were almost immune to their weapons. The new KV-1 and KV-2 heavy tanks were impervious to virtually all German anti-tank weapons, but the Red Army's logistics had completely broken down due to Luftwaffe attacks.

The German Kampfgeschwader bomber wings, namely KG 51, KG 54, and KG 55, contributed a series of heavy low-level attacks against Soviet ground targets. The headquarters of the Soviet 15th Mechanised Corps was destroyed, and its commander, General-Major Ignat Karpezo, was wounded. The Luftwaffe destroyed some 201 Soviet tanks in this area.

The five Red Army corps were mishandled while being concentrated into large powerful groups. The German troops sought to isolate individual units and destroy them. Meanwhile, the Luftwaffe ranging over the battlefields was able to separate the supporting infantry and deny them resupply of fuel and ammunition. Ultimately due to lack of adequate planning and overall coordination, the Soviet counter-attack failed to meet at Dubno.

== After the battle ==
Panzer Group 1 took a few casaulties in the battles around Dubno, losing some of its tanks, but it survived the battle still fully capable of operations. The Soviet forces took severe casualties, rendering most of its forces non-operational. The Soviet's disastrous counter-attack enabled the Germans to continue their offensive, even if it had been delayed briefly. The 8th Mechanised Corps was so badly depleted that the Stavka disbanded its headquarters and parcelled out its remaining assets to other formations of the Southwestern Front.

== Sources ==
- Bergström, Christer (2007). Barbarossa – The Air Battle: July–December 1941. London: Chevron/Ian Allan. ISBN 978-1-8578-0270-2.
- Deichmann, Paul (1999). Price, Alfred (ed.). Spearhead for Blitzkrieg: Luftwaffe Operations in Support of the Army 1939–1945. New York: Ivy Books.
- Kamenir, Victor (2008). The Bloody Triangle: The Defeat of Soviet Armor in the Ukraine, June 1941. Minneapolis: Zenith Press. ISBN 978-0-7603-3434-8.
- Khrushchev, Nikita Sergeevich (1971). Talbott, Strobe (ed.). Khrushchev Remembers. Vol. 1. André Deutsch.
- Popel, Nikolai (2001). В тяжкую пору (in Russian). Moskva: Izd-vo AST. ISBN 5-17-005626-5.
- Sołonin, Mark (2007). 22 czerwca 1941 czyli Jak zaczęła się Wielka Wojna ojczyźniana (in Polish). Poznań, Poland: Dom Wydawniczy Rebis. ISBN 978-83-7510-130-0.
