= Mikhail Kirponos =

Soviet general (1892–1941)

Mikhail Petrovich Kirponos
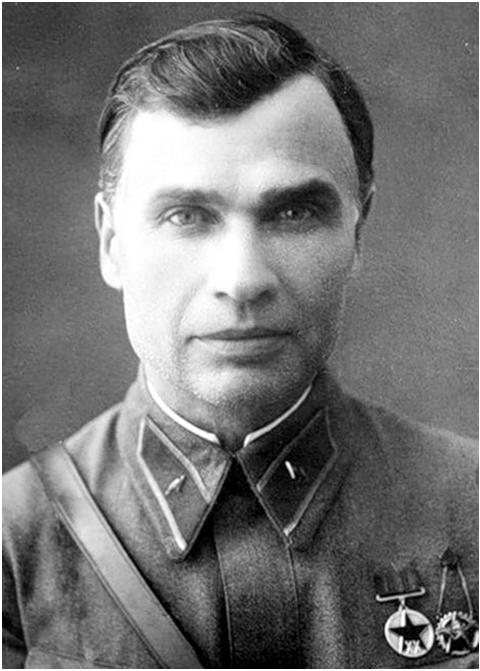
- Kirponos in 1938
- Born: 12 January 1892; Vertiyivka, Nezhinsky Uyezd, Chernigov Governorate, Russian Empire (modern-day Ukraine)
- Died: 20 September 1941 (aged 49); Dryukivshchyna, Ukrainian SSR, Soviet Union
- Military career
- Allegiance: Russian Empire (1915–1917); Soviet Russia (1917–1922); Soviet Union (1922–1941)
- Branch: Imperial Russian Army; Red Army
- Service years: 1915–1941
- Rank: Colonel General
- Commands: Leningrad Military District; Kiev Military District; Southwestern Front
- Conflicts: World War I; Russian Civil War; Winter War; World War II; Eastern Front †
- Awards: Hero of the Soviet Union; Order of Lenin; Order of the Patriotic War

Mikhail Petrovich Kirponos (Russian: Михаи́л Петро́вич Кирпоно́с, Ukrainian: Миха́йло Петро́вич Кирпоно́с, Mykhailo Petrovych Kyrponos; 12 January 1892 – 20 September 1941) was a Soviet general of the Red Army during World War II. Being accorded the highest military decoration, the Hero of the Soviet Union title, for the skill and courage in commanding a division in the 1939-1940 Finnish campaign, Kirponos is remembered for his leading role in the failed defense of Ukraine during the Battle of Brody, the Battle of Uman, and Kiev in the 1941 German invasion of the Soviet Union. He was killed during mortar shelling while trying to break out of the Kiev encirclement on 20 September 1941.

== Early life ==
Kirponos was born in a poor peasant family of Ukrainian ethnicity and worked as a forester. He was conscripted in 1915 and took part in World War I. In 1917, he joined the Red Army, fought in the Russian Civil War, and joined the Bolshevik party in 1918. Kirponos was one of the organizers of Bolshevik sabotage units in the Chernihiv region and took part in battles with the army of the Ukrainian People's Republic. Kirponos declared himself "an opponent of Ukrainian separatism."

In 1927 he graduated from the M. V. Frunze Military Academy. After graduation he was chief of staff of the 44th Rifle Division, then chief of the Supreme Soviet of the Tatar Autonomous Republic Kazan Military School from 1934 to 1939.

On 21 March 1940, he was awarded the title of the Hero of the Soviet Union for his actions during the Soviet-Finnish War. He became commander of the Leningrad Military District the same year.

== World War II ==
In February 1941 he was assigned commander of the Kiev Military District, which became the Southwestern Front at the beginning of the German-Soviet War. On the night of 21 June 1941, the day before the launch of Operation Barbarossa by the Wehrmacht, Mikhail Kirponos disregarded the strict instruction from Stavka to ignore rumors of the pending invasion the next day and spent the night preparing mission orders for his command. That same night, the unfortunate Dmitry Pavlov of the Western Front accepted Stavka's assertion that rumors of war were a deception at face value and watched a comedy in Kiev. While his front-line units were under the Stavka's general order to treat any German attack as a likely provocation and not to return fire, just as all other front line units of the Soviet armies of the frontier had been instructed, the armies of the Southwestern Front were alert and had not been completely stood down. It is possibly because of this wary attitude of Kirponos and his staff that the Southwestern Front was not caught completely flat-footed when the Germans attacked.

Disposition of forces for the Southwestern Front and considerable terrain advantages also favored Kirponos in comparison to his counterparts in Byelorussia. In general, his command had more forces to deploy in depth and Rundstedt's Army Group South only attacked with one Panzer army, as opposed to two in Army Group Center. Stavka believed that Kirponos had enough forces under his command to comply with the Stavka General Chief of Staff Georgy Zhukov's "Directive No. 3", which called for a counter-attack by the Southwestern Front with the objective of seizing Lublin in German-occupied Poland. Kirponos and his staff were ambivalent about this ambitious proposal.

Shortly thereafter, Zhukov himself showed up at Southwestern Front headquarters at Ternopil with Nikita Khrushchev, to direct the operation. The result was the ill-fated attack against the flanks of the 1st Panzer Group that was advancing toward Kiev between the 5th and 6th armies, known as the Battle of Brody. Severe communications, supply and coordination problems plagued the operation; the uncoordinated Mechanized Corps were late and disorganised at their jump-off points, short of equipment, entering the battle piecemeal.

That Zhukov and Kirponos were at odds about the offensive made things worse, with Kirponos issuing a general order to cease the offensive on 27 June, because he wanted to make his front line shorter, "so as to prevent the enemy tank groupings from penetrating into the rear of the 6th and 26th Armies", according to H. Baghramyan. This order was quickly countermanded by Zhukov who ordered the attack resumed, an order that was promptly refused on the "personal responsibility" of the commander of the 9th Mechanized Corps, Konstantin Rokossovsky, leaving the commander of the 8th Mechanized Corps unaware that he was engaging alone.

Despite these difficulties, and the eventual loss of the great majority of the tanks involved in the fight, the German command was taken off guard,

In the Army Group South sector, heavy fighting continues on the right flank of Panzer Group 1. The Russian 8th Tank Corps has effected a deep penetration of our front and is now in the rear of the 11th Panzer Division. This penetration has seriously disrupted our rear areas between Brody and Dubno. The enemy is threatening Dubno from the southwest ... the enemy also has several separate tank groups acting in the rear of Panzer Group 1, which are managing to cover considerable distances.

— General Franz Halder, diary

Even though the Southwestern Front did comparatively better than the other front commands in the frontier battles and generally remained organised and kept some operational initiative, Nikita Khrushchev noted that Zhukov said "I am afraid your commander (Kirponos) here is pretty weak". Zhukov was soon forced to return to Moscow due to the dangerous situation developing along the Bialystok–Minsk–Smolensk axis, and the Southwestern Front and the new Southern Front created from the Odessa Military District, were put under the umbrella of the "Southwestern Direction" commanded by Marshal Semyon Budyonny, a long time Stalin associate, in mid July, with disastrous results in the Battle of Uman.

The Southwestern Front fought the Battle of Kiev. Kirponos was killed in action during mortar shelling in a ravine near Dryukivshchyna, 15 km (9.3 mi) southwest of Lokhvytsia, while trying to break out of the Kiev encirclement, a Soviet disaster due to the advantageous position of the Germans, exacerbated by the lateness of the order to withdraw.

== Legacy ==
After his death, he was buried in the ravine which had been dug to cover the breakout. After the recapture of Kiev by the Red Army in 1943, he was reburied in Kiev.

In December 2022, (Mikhail) Kirponos street in Kyiv, Ukraine was renamed Vsevolod Petriv street, part of a wider campaign of derussification and decommunization in Ukraine A statue dedicated to Kirponos in this street was also dismantled in October 2023.
