= Proletarsky Urban Settlement =

Proletarsky Urban Settlement or Proletarskoye Urban Settlement is the name of several municipal formations in Russia.

- Proletarsky Urban Settlement, a municipal formation which Proletarsky Settlement Okrug in Rakityansky District of Belgorod Oblast is incorporated as
- Proletarsky Urban Settlement, a municipal formation which the Work Settlement of Proletarsky in Serpukhovsky District of Moscow Oblast is incorporated as
- Proletarskoye Urban Settlement, a municipal formation which Proletarskoye Settlement in Novgorodsky District of Novgorod Oblast is incorporated as
- Proletarskoye Urban Settlement, an administrative division and a municipal formation which the town of Proletarsk and three rural localities in Proletarsky District of Rostov Oblast are incorporated as

== See also ==
- Proletarsky (disambiguation)
