= Proletarsky =

Proletarsky (masculine), Proletarskaya (feminine), or Proletarskoye (neuter) may refer to:

- Proletarsky District (disambiguation), several districts in the countries of the former Soviet Union
- Proletarsky Urban Settlement (or Proletarskoye Urban Settlement), several municipal urban settlements in Russia
- Proletarsky, Russia (Proletarskaya, Proletarskoye), several inhabited localities in Russia
- Proletarskyi (Proletarsky), an urban-type settlement in Luhansk Oblast, Ukraine
- Proletarskaya metro station (disambiguation), several metro stations in the cities of the former Soviet Union

== See also ==
- Proletarsk
- Proletariy
- Proletariat (disambiguation)
