= Proletarsky, Russia =

Proletarsky (Russian: Пролета́рский; masculine), Proletarskaya (Пролета́рская; feminine), or Proletarskoye (Пролета́рское; neuter) is the name of several inhabited localities in Russia.

Urban localities

- Proletarsky, Belgorod Oblast, a work settlement in Rakityansky District of Belgorod Oblast
- Proletarsky, Moscow Oblast, a work settlement in Serpukhovsky District of Moscow Oblast

Rural localities

- Proletarsky, Republic of Adygea, a khutor in Maykopsky District of the Republic of Adygea
- Proletarsky, Pogarsky District, Bryansk Oblast, a settlement in Yudinovsky Selsoviet of Pogarsky District of Bryansk Oblast
- Proletarsky, Trubchevsky District, Bryansk Oblast, a settlement in Usokhsky Selsoviet of Trubchevsky District of Bryansk Oblast
- Proletarsky, Republic of Kalmykia, a settlement in Bagatugtunskaya Rural Administration of Yashaltinsky District of the Republic of Kalmykia
- Proletarsky, Kaluga Oblast, a settlement in Zhizdrinsky District of Kaluga Oblast
- Proletarsky, Oboyansky District, Kursk Oblast, a khutor in Bashkatovsky Selsoviet of Oboyansky District of Kursk Oblast
- Proletarsky, Zheleznogorsky District, Kursk Oblast, a settlement in Rastorogsky Selsoviet of Zheleznogorsky District of Kursk Oblast
- Proletarsky, Lipetsk Oblast, a settlement in Speshnevo-Ivanovsky Selsoviet of Dankovsky District of Lipetsk Oblast
- Proletarsky, Magadan Oblast, a settlement in Yagodninsky District of Magadan Oblast
- Proletarsky, Novgorod Oblast, a settlement in Borovenkovskoye Settlement of Okulovsky District of Novgorod Oblast
- Proletarsky, Novosibirsk Oblast, a settlement in Ordynsky District of Novosibirsk Oblast
- Proletarsky, Lyubinsky District, Omsk Oblast, a settlement in Proletarsky Rural Okrug of Lyubinsky District of Omsk Oblast
- Proletarsky, Moskalensky District, Omsk Oblast, a settlement in Zvezdinsky Rural Okrug of Moskalensky District of Omsk Oblast
- Proletarsky, Mtsensky District, Oryol Oblast, a settlement in Alyabyevsky Selsoviet of Mtsensky District of Oryol Oblast
- Proletarsky, Novosilsky District, Oryol Oblast, a settlement in Golunsky Selsoviet of Novosilsky District of Oryol Oblast
- Proletarsky, Penza Oblast, a settlement in Proletarsky Selsoviet of Zemetchinsky District of Penza Oblast
- Proletarsky, Perm Krai, a settlement in Karagaysky District of Perm Krai
- Proletarsky, Orlovsky District, Rostov Oblast, a khutor in Proletarskoye Rural Settlement of Orlovsky District of Rostov Oblast
- Proletarsky, Tatsinsky District, Rostov Oblast, a khutor in Skosyrskoye Rural Settlement of Tatsinsky District of Rostov Oblast
- Proletarsky, Miloslavsky District, Ryazan Oblast, a settlement in Masalshchinsky Rural Okrug of Miloslavsky District of Ryazan Oblast
- Proletarsky, Shatsky District, Ryazan Oblast, a settlement in Bolsheagishevsky Rural Okrug of Shatsky District of Ryazan Oblast
- Proletarsky, Shilovsky District, Ryazan Oblast, a settlement in Bolshepekselsky Rural Okrug of Shilovsky District of Ryazan Oblast
- Proletarsky, Krasnogvardeysky District, Stavropol Krai, a khutor in Krasnogvardeysky District of Stavropol Krai
- Proletarsky, Kursky District, Stavropol Krai, a khutor in Kursky District of Stavropol Krai
- Proletarsky, Gorokhovetsky District, Vladimir Oblast, a settlement in Gorokhovetsky District of Vladimir Oblast
- Proletarsky, Vyaznikovsky District, Vladimir Oblast, a settlement in Vyaznikovsky District of Vladimir Oblast
- Proletarsky, Vologda Oblast, a settlement in Yavengsky Selsoviet of Vozhegodsky District of Vologda Oblast
- Proletarskoye, Republic of Dagestan, a selo in Kizlyarsky Selsoviet of Kizlyarsky District of the Republic of Dagestan
- Proletarskoye, Kabardino-Balkar Republic, a selo in Prokhladnensky District of the Kabardino-Balkar Republic
