= Obolensk =

Obolensk may refer to:

- Obolensk, an ancient Russian city; now a rural locality (a selo) of Obolenskoye in Kaluga Oblast
- Obolensk, Moscow Oblast, an urban-type settlement in Serpukhovsky District of Moscow Oblast, Russia
