= Proletarsky District, Russia =

Proletarsky District is the name of several administrative and municipal districts in Russia. The name literally means "pertaining to proletariat".

== Districts of the federal subjects ==
Location of Rostov Oblast in Russia

- Proletarsky District, Rostov Oblast, an administrative and municipal district of Rostov Oblast

== City divisions ==
- Proletarsky City District, Rostov-on-Don, a city district of Rostov-on-Don, the administrative center of Rostov Oblast
- Proletarsky City District, Saransk, a city district of Saransk, the capital of the Republic of Mordovia
- Proletarsky City District, Tula, a city district of Tula, the administrative center of Tula Oblast
- Proletarsky City District, Tver, a city district of Tver, the administrative center of Tver Oblast
Cities in Russia with a city division called "Proletarsky"

== See also ==
- Proletarsky (disambiguation)
- Proletarsk, name of several inhabited localities in Russia
