= Filipp Mironov =

Soviet general (1872–1921)

Filipp Kuzmich Mironov Филипп Кузьмич Миронов
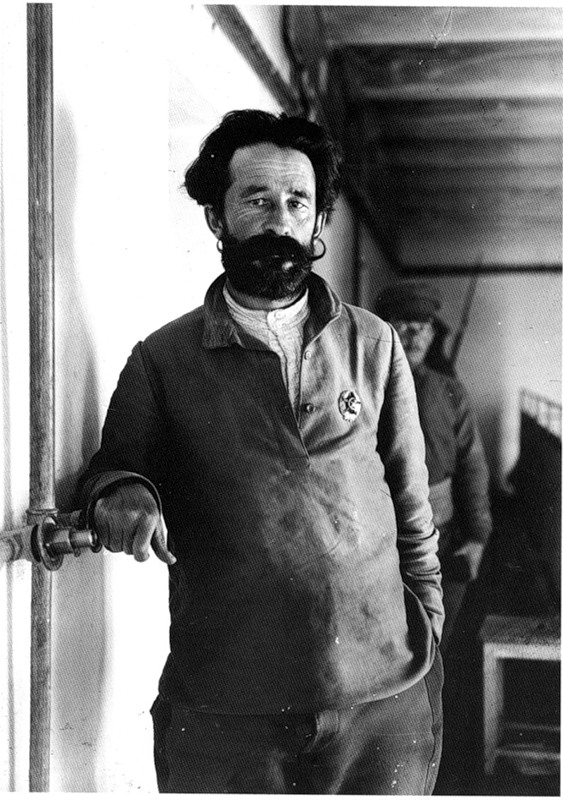
- Born: 14 October 1872; Ust-Medveditskaya, Russian Empire
- Died: 2 April 1921 (aged 48); Butyrka Prison, Soviet Union
- Military career
- Allegiance: Russian Empire (1890-1917); Russian SFSR (1917–1921)
- Service years: 1890-1921
- Rank: Praporshchik Russian Empire Komkor (RSFSR)
- Commands: 2nd Cavalry Corps
- Conflicts: Russo-Japanese War; World War One; Russian Civil War
- Awards: Order of the Red Banner (two times)

Filipp Kuzmich Mironov (Russian: Филипп Кузьмич Миронов; 1872–1921) was a Bolshevik revolutionary leader during and after the Russian Revolution. He actively supported the idea of democracy in the form of the Soviet Republic, was one of the first commanders in the Red Army. Mironov was commander of the Cavalry Corps and refused to subordinate himself to the orders of the Southern Front Command. He had organised a mutiny with 5,000 Red Guards in 1919.

In response, he was trialled in a military tribunal organised by Trotsky and initially sentenced to death for military insubordination. He was pardoned on the eve of this execution due to the intervention of Trotsky and Lenin, but later re-arrested on charges for conspiring to organise an insurrection against the Soviet government. According to historian Laura Engelstein, the documents do not specify "if the charges had any foundation". Mironov was shot by the Cheka in Moscow.

== Biography ==
Filipp Kuzmich Mironov was born in 1872 on the farm Buerak-Senyutkin, in the village of Ust-Medveditskaya, into a Cossack family of the Don Host. He graduated from the parochial school and three classes of the gymnasium, having mastered the rest of the course on his own. In 1890–1894, he served in active military service, from where, as one of the best, he entered the Novocherkassk Junker Cossack School in 1895, successfully graduating from it in 1898.

Already as an officer, he took part in the Russo-Japanese War as part of the 26th Don Regiment, where he earned the glory of a dashing Cossack, as he commanded a sotnia that went behind enemy lines, as well as four orders, the rank of podsaul and the rights of personal nobility associated with it. On June 18, 1906, he spoke at a meeting of the Cossacks of the Ust-Medveditsky district with a call to abandon the police service. He traveled to St. Petersburg together with Pavel Ageev and deacon Nikolai Burykin to submit this decision to the First State Duma. On the way back, all three were arrested in Novocherkassk and sentenced to 3 months of arrest in a military guardhouse. After a new meeting of the Ust-Medveditsky Cossacks declared the district chieftain hostage, Mironov, Ageev and Burykin were released. But soon Mironov was expelled from the Don army (with the deprivation of the rank of lieutenant "for actions discrediting the rank of an officer").

With the outbreak of World War I, he volunteered for the front as part of the 30th Don Regiment of the 3rd Don Division, became the commander of the reconnaissance sotnia of this division (he was given back the rank of cavalier), was promoted to yesaul (March 1915) and military foremen (January 1916), and was awarded the Golden Weapon for Bravery. Over the next three years, he was awarded two more orders. From March 1916, he acted as assistant commander of the 32nd Don Regiment for combat units.

After the October Revolution of 1917 he joined the Bolsheviks. During the Russian Civil War, he commanded large military formations, including the 2nd Cavalry Army. He enjoyed very great popularity among the Don population. He opposed the policy of decossackization and did not receive the support of Leon Trotsky in matters of interaction with the peasantry. In September 1918, he was awarded the Order of the Red Banner No. 3, becoming one of the first cavaliers.

He opposed the incompetent, in his opinion, military leadership of Trotsky. Having learned about the circular letter on decossackization, apparently falsified at the initiative of the Donburo, in a letter to Grigory Sokolnikov, a member of the Revolutionary Military Council of the Southern Front, Mironov wrote: "...it's time to disperse the political adventurers from the Donburo (Syrtsov, Larin, Khodorovsky, etc.), and with them Trotsky from the army..." In August 1919, his opposition to the leadership of the Red Army led him to mutiny, declaring his intention to himself take the leadership of the Southern Front against the Volunteer Army of Anton Denikin. He declared:

"In order to save the revolution's gains only one course remains now: Overthrow of the power of the Communist Party [...] For the causes of the country's ruination one has to look to the quite villainous actions of the government party, the party of the communists, who have aroused against them the indignation and general discontent of the toiling masses. All land to the peasants! All factories and workshops to the workers! All power to the toiling people, embodied by genuine Soviets of worker, peasant and cossack deputies! Down with the autocracy of leaders and the bureaucracy of commissars and communists!"

For his unauthorized expedition, he was arrested the following month by Semyon Budyonny and sentenced to death, but Trotsky himself stopped the execution and Mironov was pardoned by the All-Russian Central Executive Committee. According to the version of the Whites, in August 1919, Mironov raised an uprising, which was joined by several Red Cossack regiments. The uprising was suppressed in a few days by the troops of Budyonny (4th Cavalry Division of Oka Gorodovikov, later Deputy Commander Mironov).

At a meeting of the Politburo of the Russian Communist Party on October 23, 1919, political confidence was expressed in Mironov and, later, command of the 2nd Cavalry Army was entrusted to him.

In 1920 he joined the Russian Communist Party. On October 12–14, 1920 for the defeat of the troops of Pyotr Wrangel in the ensuing Nikopol-Alexander battle, for disrupting the intentions of Józef Piłsudski and Wrangel to unite on the right bank of the Dnieper and the defeat of the cavalry corps of Nikolai Babiyev and Ivan Barbovich, Mironov was awarded an honorary revolutionary weapon and the Order of the Red Banner. Participated in the defeat of the White troops at Sivash and the expulsion of the remnants of the White armies from Crimea.

In February 1921, he was arrested on a false accusation of Donchek, when he carelessly drove into his native village (Mironov made many enemies in the Revolutionary Military Council, both among Trotsky's supporters and his opponents, Budyonny and Voroshilov, for openly criticizing the decossackization policy). He was killed by a sentry in the courtyard of the Butyrka prison under unclear circumstances. Researchers Roy Medvedev and S. P. Starikov claimed that Mironov was killed on the personal order of Leon Trotsky. Conversely, American historian Laura Engelstein stated that Mironov was shot by the Cheka in Moscow on alleged charges of conspiracy and organising an insurrection. The Cheka had issued a notification letter which claimed he was guilty of "preparation of a counter-revolutionary uprising on the Don".

He was rehabilitated by the Military Collegium of the Supreme Court of the Soviet Union in 1960 "due to the lack of corpus delicti".

== Personal life ==
He was born in Ust-Medveditskaya and graduated from Novocherkassk military cadet school.

He commanded the 2nd Cavalry Army between 6 September and 6 December 1920, with which he participated in the Siege of Perekop (1920).

== Sources ==
- "чпеообс мйфетбфхтб -[ вЙПЗТБЖЙЙ ]- мПУЕЧ е. ж. нЙТПОПЧ". Militera.lib.ru.
- "ВОЕННАЯ ЛИТЕРАТУРА -[ Мемуары ]- Соколов-Соколенок Н. А. По путевке комсомольской". Militera.lib.ru.
- "Миронов Филипп Кузьмич". Konnica.tut.su.
- "КОМАНДАРМ МИРОНОВ. СВИДЕТЕЛЬ СОБЫТИЙ — ВОЕННЫЙ ШИФРОВАЛЬЩИК БОЯРЧИКОВ ::: Боярчиков А.И. - Воспоминания ::: Боярчиков Александр Иванович ::: Воспоминания о ГУЛАГе :: База данных :: Авторы и тексты". Sakharov-center.ru.
- http://www.hrono.ru/biograf/mironov.html
- "Филипп Кузьмич Миронов". Pseudology.org.
- "п■п╬я│я┌я┐п© п╬пЁя─п╟п╫п╦я┤п╣п╫". Zhurnal.lib.ru.
- "Геноцид казачества в 1919 году - 1 Августа 2011 - ПРИМОРСКАЯ КАЗАЧЬЯ ОБЩИНА". Primorski-kazak.at.ua. 2011-08-01.
- "КТО БРАЛ КРЫМ В 1920 ГОООДУ". Rkka.ru.
