= Galina Serdyukovskaya =

- Галина Сердюковская
- Born: Galina Nikolaevna Serdyukovskaya; 6 November 1921; Moscow, Russian SFSR
- Died: 11 June 2004 (aged 82); Moscow, Russia
- Education: First Moscow State Medical University
- Occupations: Academic; Hygienist; Politician
- Years active: 1946–2003
- Children: 2
- Awards: Order of the Red Banner of Labour; Order of the Badge of Honour (x2)

Galina Nikolaevna Serdyukovskaya (Russian: Галина Николаевна Сердюковская; 6 November 1921 – 11 June 2004) was a Russian hygienist, academic and politician. She was school state sanitary inspector at the School of Sanitation of the Molotovsky (now part of the Proletarsky) district of Moscow from 1946 to 1948 before working at the Main Sanitary and Epidemiological Administration of the Ministry of Health in Moscow until 1960. Serdyukovskaya served as director of the Research Institute of Hygiene and Disease Prevention of Children and Adolescents of the All-Union Scientific Center for Preventive Medicine of the USSR Academy of Medical Sciences (later the Russian Academy of Medical Sciences) between 1963 and 1996. She was a people's deputy of the Congress of People's Deputies of the Soviet Union and of the Supreme Soviet of the Soviet Union from 1989 to 1991. Serdyukovskaya was a recipient of the Order of the Red Banner of Labour and the Order of the Badge of Honour (twice).

== Biography ==
Serdyukovskaya was born in Moscow on 6 November 1921 to Nikolai Aleksandrovich Khrustalev and Anna Georgievna Emaeva. She was educated at the sanitary and hygienic faculty of the First Moscow State Medical University from 1939 to 1946. Between 1946 and 1948, Serdyukovskaya worked as a school state sanitary inspector at the School of Sanitation of the Molotovsky (now part of the Proletarsky) district of Moscow. She was appointed a senior school inspector of the main sanitary and anti-epidemic department and later became senior inspector, head of department, chief inspector of the Main Sanitary and Epidemiological Administration of the Ministry of Health in Moscow in 1948, remaining in the job until 1960. Serdyukovskaya served as secretary of the party committee of the Ministry of Health between 1960 and 1963, supervising concerns over monitoring birth and mortality rates, morbidity, selecting, training and organising personnel, while simultaneously resolving personnel issues at the local level.

In 1963, she was appointed director of the Research Institute of Hygiene and Disease Prevention of Children and Adolescents of the All-Union Scientific Center for Preventive Medicine of the All-Union Scientific Center for Preventive Medicine of the USSR Academy of Medical Sciences. Seven years later, Serdyukovskaya defended her thesis doctoral dissertation The Problem of Studying the Health Status of Schoolchildren in the USSR on children's health. She became a professor in 1971, and a member of the executive committee of the International Union for School and University Hygiene in 1972, and a corresponding member of the USSR Academy of Medical Sciences in 1975, before becoming a full member in February 1980. Serdyukovskaya also served as Deputy Academician-Secretary of the Department of Hygiene, Microbiology and Epidemiology of the USSR Academy of Medical Sciences, chaired the All-Union Problem Commission "Hygiene of Children and Adolescents" and was deputy chairman of the All-Union Scientific Society of Hygienists as well as at the Joint Coordinating Council of the USSR Academy of Medical Sciences and Academy of Pedagogical Sciences "Health, Education and Training of Children and Adolescents". She was a member of the Bureau of the All-Union Society "Knowledge", an honorary member of several domestic scientific medical societies, as well as medical societies in Bulgaria, Cuba and Poland. Srdyukovskaya was a member of the editorial board of the journals Hygiene and Sanitation and Paediatrics.

She was a member of the Communist Party of the Soviet Union. Serdyukovskaya served as a people's deputy of the Congress of People's Deputies of the Soviet Union from the USSR Academy of Medical Sciences together with 40 scientific medical societies from 1989 to 1991. She was also a deputy of the Supreme Soviet of the Soviet Union during its final convocation, serving as a member of both the Committee of the Supreme Soviet of the USSR on Women's Affairs, Family Protection, Motherhood and Childhood. Serdyukovskaya left the Academy of Medical Sciences when it was reorganised into the Scientific Center for the Protection of Children's and Adolescents' Health of the Russian Academy of Medical Sciences in 1996. She later became an advisor to the director of the Research Institute of Hygiene and Health Protection of Children and Adolescents of the State Institution Scientific Center for Children's Health of the Russian Academy of Medical Sciences until August 2003. She was the author 244 scientific works published both in domestic journals and abroad. Serdyukovskaya authored and co-authored 11 monographs (publishing house "Medicine"), 44 scientific collections, textbooks, aids for sanitary doctors, methodological collections and for other publications.

== Personal life ==
She was married to Mark Leonidovich Serdyukovsky and they had two children. Serdyukovskaya died in Moscow on 11 June 2004 and was buried at the city's Kuntsevo Cemetery.

== Awards ==
She was a recipient of the Order of the Red Banner of Labour and twice of the Order of the Badge of Honour in 1960 and 1966. Serdyukovskaya was awarded the F.F. Erisman Prize of the Academy of Medical Sciences in 1982 and the Medal "For Services to National Healthcare" in 2001. She also got the "For Diligent Labour", "Excellence in Health Care" and the Mayor of Moscow's prize among other awards.
