= Valuysky =

Valuysky (masculine), Valuyskaya (feminine), or Valuyskoye (neuter) may refer to:

- Valuysky District, a district of Belgorod Oblast, Russia
- Valuysky (rural locality) (Valuyskaya, Valuyskoye), name of several rural localities in Russia
- Semyon Valuysky (born 1991), Russian ice hockey player
