= Club of the factory named after Peter Alekseev =

- Клуб фабрики имени Петра Алексеева
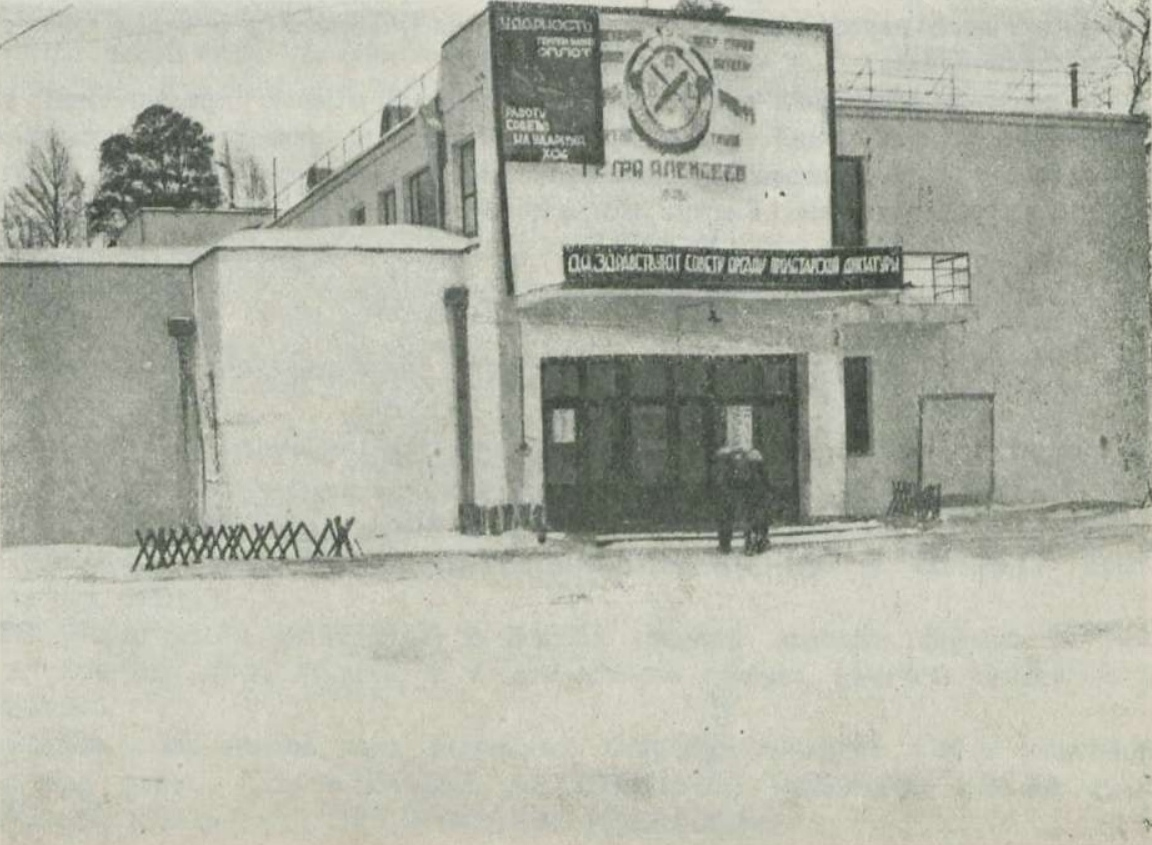
- Main facade in the early 1930s
- Interactive map of Club of the factory named after Peter Alekseev
- Location: Moscow, Mikhalkovskaya Street, Building 36, Building 1
- Designer: L. A. Vesnin

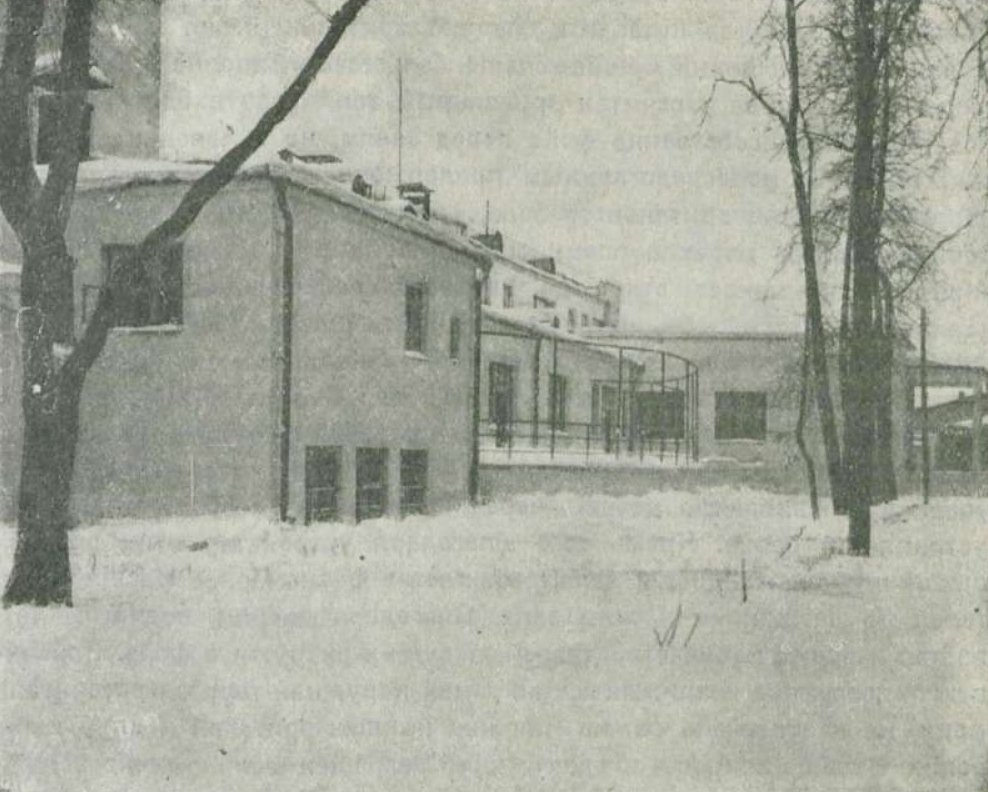
The side facade in the early 1930s

Club of the factory named after Peter Alekseev (Russian: Клуб фабрики имени Петра Алексеева) is a former house of culture in the north of Moscow near the estate Mikhalkovo (Mikhalkovskaya Street, house 36, Kor.1). It was built in 1927-1929 for the Moscow fine-wool factory named after Peter Alekseev in the constructivist style, designed by the architect L. A. Vesnin. The building had an asymmetric composition of three volumes of simple geometric shapes. In Soviet times it had the status of a monument of architecture. In 1982 the club was rebuilt. In 2010, it was occupied by Jehovah's Witnesses.

== History ==
In the spring of 1927 the Moscow regional department of the trade union of textile workers decided to start building workers' clubs. It was decided to develop 4 types of clubs: type A with a hall for 500 seats and 10-12 club rooms (for factories with the number of workers from 1000 to 3000 people), type B with a hall for 700 seats and 14-15 rooms (for factories with 3000-4000 workers), type B with a hall for 1000 seats and 15-18 rooms (for factories with 4000-7000 workers), type G with a hall for 1500 seats, 20 rooms, a gym and an audience (for factories with more than 7000 workers). In March 1927 the architect LA Vesnin worked out a project for a club of type A. According to this project, clubs were built in Rostokin (24 Agricultural Street), at the Proletary and Savvinsky factories and in Mikhalkov.

The construction of the club for a fine-woven factory named after Peter Alekseev in Mikhalkov began in July–August 1927, was finished in the rough in 1928, and finally in 1929. The architect LA Vesnin did not take part in the construction of the club himself. Taking into account the terrain, Vesnin's project was mirrored along the longitudinal axis. Adifference from the original design was the additional wide entrance from the estate park. The cost of building the building was 26 rubles and 50 kopecks per cubed meter.

After the opening of the club, factory workers noted a number of its shortcomings: the auditorium for 450 people was too small and could not accommodate all comers; there was no gymnasium, so physical education had to take place on the stage of the auditorium; and there was no room for a drama circle. In addition, a number of premises of the club was converted into housing for workers.

== Architecture ==
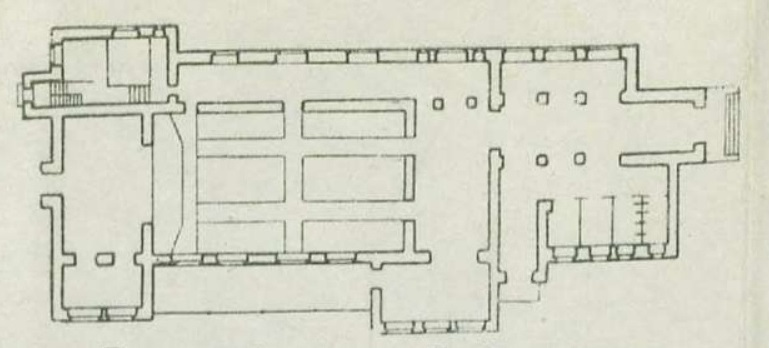
Plan of the first floor of the club

The club of the factory in its architecture is very different from most other Moscow houses of culture of that period. Since this is essentially a country club building, the architect was not limited to the small size of the site. For this reason, the club was made not of high-rise, but rather stretched in length. The second floor was originally only a small part of the building.

On the first floor there is an auditorium and associated rooms. The foyer of the first floor is quite spacious. It continues into a wide corridor adjoining the wall of the auditorium and is lined with a series of doors. At the end of the corridor are the entrances to the premises connected with the stage. From the street side, the corridor adjoins to an open terrace. From the garden side, the club had a second wide entrance. On the opposite end of the building there was a staircase leading to the second floor, and had a separate entrance from the street. The wardrobe was located in the corner between the main and side entrances. To the right of the main entrance was a toilet, a smoking room, and an administration room. A buffet area was located on the side of the auditorium and had an entrance from the lobby and to the outdoor terrace, where it was possible to set tables in the summer.

On the second floor there were club rooms of different sizes. They were located on both sides of a long corridor. Opposite the stairs was a meeting room with access to the flat roof of the foyer. To its left was a library and a reading room. In the corridor of the second floor were also seven small rooms for circles, the portal of the movie screen-box of the auditorium, and an exit to a small balcony. In the basement of the building there is a room originally equipped for a shooting gallery.
