= Oka Gorodovikov =

Soviet colonel general (1879–1960)

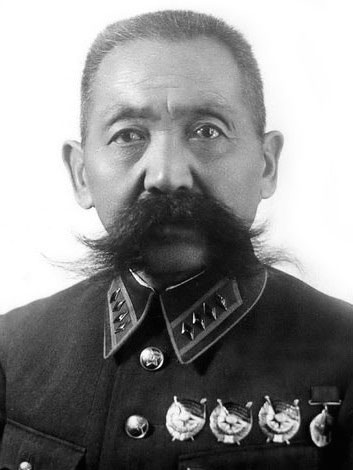
- Born: 1st October [O.S. 19 September] 1879; Mokraya Elmuta village, Don Host Oblast, Russian Empire (located within present-day Rostov Oblast)
- Died: 26 February 1960 (aged 80); Moscow, USSR
- Military career
- Allegiance: (Russian Empire) Imperial Russia (1903–1907, 1915–1917) (Russian Soviet Federative Socialist Republic) Russian SFSR (1918–1922); Soviet Union (1922–1947)
- Branch: Red Army, cavalry
- Rank: Colonel general
- Conflicts: World War I; Russian Civil War; Offensives of the Don Army; Battle of Tsaritsyn; North Caucasus (1920); Rostov-Novocherkassk Operation; Tikhoretsk Operation (1920); Battle of Yegorlyk; Kuban-Novorossiysk Operation; Final Operations againts Wrangelshchina; Northern Taurida Operation; Trans-Dnieper Operation; Perekop-Chongar Operation; World War II; Battle of Moscow; Battle of Stalingrad
- Awards: Hero of the Soviet Union
- Other work: Communist Party of the Soviet Union (1919–1960?)

Oka Ivanovich Gorodovikov (Russian: Ока Иванович Городовиков; 1st October [O.S. 19 September] 1879 – 26 February 1960) was a Red Army cavalry general and Hero of the Soviet Union of Kalmyk descent.

== Early life ==
Gorodovikov was born on 1 October [O.S. 19 September] 1879 to a Kalmyk peasant family of the Mokraia El'muta khutor, Salsky District, within the Don territory. Starting from 8 years old, rather than receive an education, he would work various jobs: these being as a shepherd, a herdsman, and a mine worker.

In 1903 Gorodovikov would be drafted into the Imperial Russian Army and serve with the 9th Don Cossack Regiment in Poland, then a part of the Russian Empire, where he would command a squad, then a platoon, and would rise to the rank of sergeant major before being demobilised in 1907.

After returning to civilian life, Gorodovikov worked for a time at the Torgovaya Station in Stavropol Province but then returned to his homeland of the Don to once again put his hands to various jobs this time including a groom, a postal cabman, and as a peddler of goods for a merchant. From 1910 he began instructing horse riding for the Don Army in the village of Platovskaya.

One year after the start of World War 1, Gorodovikov would once again be drafted, this time with the 43rd Don Cossack Regiment, commanding a platoon. In 1916, due to severe injury, he returned to the Don and joined the 39th Don Cossack Sotnia (squadron) at the Sulin Station. The next year unrest would spread across Russia, developing into the February Revolution, which Gorodovikov would take part in on his native soil.

== Red Army career ==
Gorodovikov would participate in the Russian Civil War, joining the fledgling Red Army in February 1918, as a cavalry commander of Red Cossack riders. Leading a reconnaissance platoon from February and squadrons of Dumenko's and Budyonny's partisan detachments from April; he would then take the position of a second-in-command in the 20th Cavalry Regiment of the 1st Cavalry Brigade from October as well as in a cavalry brigade from later in November. From December he'd command a cavalry brigade on the Tsaritsyn Front.

In 1919, starting from February Gorodovikov would lead the 19th Cavalry Regiment of the 4th Cavalry Division and then the Division itself from August of the same year. The next year he'd transfer to the 6th from the 4th, starting from April, and from 16 July to 6 September he'd command the 2nd Cavalry Army against Wrangel's forces in the Crimea for a time before being replaced by Filipp Mironov. Gorodovikov would join the Communist Party (Bolsheviks) in 1919.

After the Civil War, Gorodovikov spent over a decade in military education, completing several courses: the nine-month Higher Academic Courses in 1922; advanced training courses for senior commanders at the Frunze Military Academy in 1927; courses for commanders at the Tolmachev Military-Political Academy in 1930; with him finally graduating from the Frunze Military Academy in 1932. After graduating, Gorodovikov was put in command of the 1st Mounted Corps of the Cherven Cossacks as well as serving as the deputy commander of the Central Asian Military District from 1932 to 1938. He then became inspector general of cavalry for the Red Army from 1938 to 1943 and deputy main commander of cavalry from 1943 after.

The Second World War brought Gorodovikov once again into a frontline command leading the 8th Red Army on the North-West Front from July 1941 and later as a staff officer with mounted units that raided the enemy's rear during the Battle of Stalingrad. Gorodovikov was one of few Kalmyks who were spared from deportation to Siberia near the end of the war and had in fact helped organise the deportations of his fellow Kalmyks in 1943 and 1944.

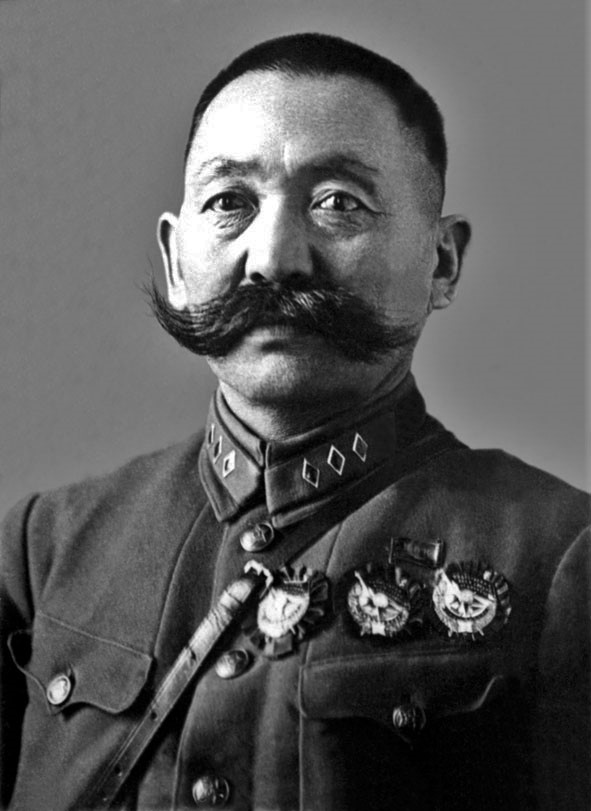

Gorodovikov retired in 1947 with pension. During his career he earned many awards as well as the title of Hero of the Soviet Union in 1958 after retiring:

Awards	Date	Country
Order of the Red Banner (6)	25.07.1920, 13.03.1922, 22.02.1933, 22.01.1942, 03.11.1944, 06.11.1947	Soviet Union
Order of Lenin (3)	14.06.1940, 21.02.1945, 10.03.1958	Soviet Union
Order of the Patriotic War, 1st Class	25.04.1944	Soviet Union
Medal "For the Defence of Stalingrad"	N/A	Soviet Union
Hero of the Soviet Union	10.03.1958	Soviet Union
Order of the Red Banner	N/A	Mongolian People's Republic
Order of the Republic	15.03.1943	Tuvan People's Republic

He was also given several other medals, honorary weapons, and gold, personalised watches.

== Death and legacy ==
Gorodovikov died on 26 February 1960 and was buried at the Novodevichy Cemetery in Moscow but even before his death he began to be immortalised: in celebration of him being awarded the Hero of the Soviet Union, streets in Lipetsk and Rostov-on-Don were renamed in his honour and later, in 1971, the town of Bashanta became the town of Gorodovikovsk. Five years later an equestrian statue of the general was unveiled in a square of Elista, the capital of Kalmykia, and still stands to this day.

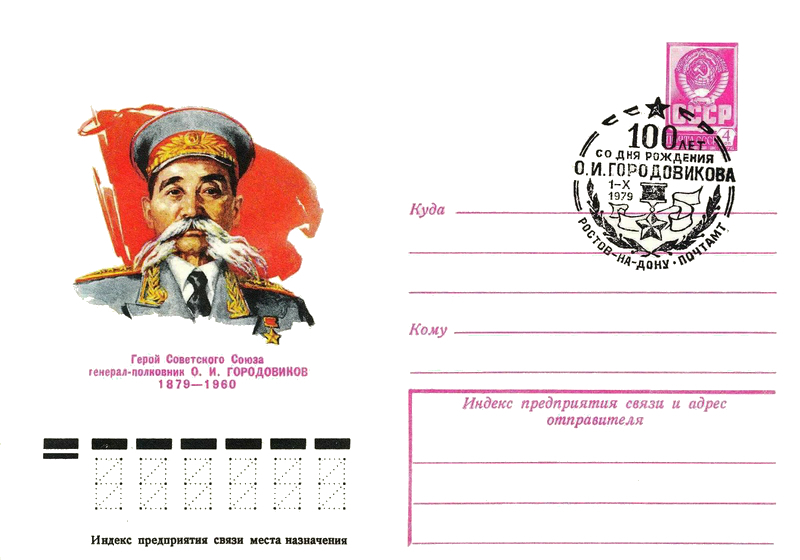
A 1979 postcard depicting Oka Gorodovikov wearing the Hero of the Soviet Union medal.
