= Valuysky (rural locality) =

Name of several Russian rural localities

Valuysky (Russian: Валуйский; masculine), Valuyskaya (Валуйская; feminine), or Valuyskoye (Валуйское; neuter) is the name of several rural localities in Russia:

- Valuysky, Oryol Oblast, a settlement in Otradinsky Selsoviet of Mtsensky District of Oryol Oblast
- Valuysky, Rostov Oblast, a khutor in Sukhovskoye Rural Settlement of Proletarsky District of Rostov Oblast
