= Battle of Yegorlyk =

- Part of the Tikhoretsk Operation (1920) and the broader North Caucasus Operation (1920)
Date	25 February — 2 March 1920
Location	Cherkasy District (Don Host Region)
Result	Soviet victory

Belligerents
Soviet Russia	South Russia

Commanders and leaders
Semyon Budyonny; Mikhail Velikanov	Alexander Pavlov

Strength
2.7 thousand bayonets 10 thousand sabers	3.5 thousand bayonets 13 thousand sabers

The Battle of Yegorlyk was a military engagement that lasted from February 25 to March 2, 1920. The battle was fought between the Red Army's 1st Cavalry Army (Koniarmia) and the AFSRs Pavlov Cavalry Group. It was the largest cavalry battle of the Russian Civil War and one of the largest cavalry battles of the 20th century, involving even more cavalrymen than the Battle of Komarów. (Note: 18.600 sabres at Komarov and nearly 25.000 at Yegorlyk)

As a result of this battle the red army advanced 100km southward and forced the white movement into a total retreat along with the red army started its third phase of the North Caucasus Operation (1920).

== Prelude ==
By February 1920, the offensive capabilities of the Red Army had run out, and, along with the freezing temperatures of nearly -20°C, a proper front was established on the Manych River. The exhausted nature of both the AFSR and the RKKA was shown in the fact that both Red and White commands placed their faith in their cavalry forces, which led to the deployment of major cavalry formations with 10.5 thousand Red sabers and 13 thousand White sabers.

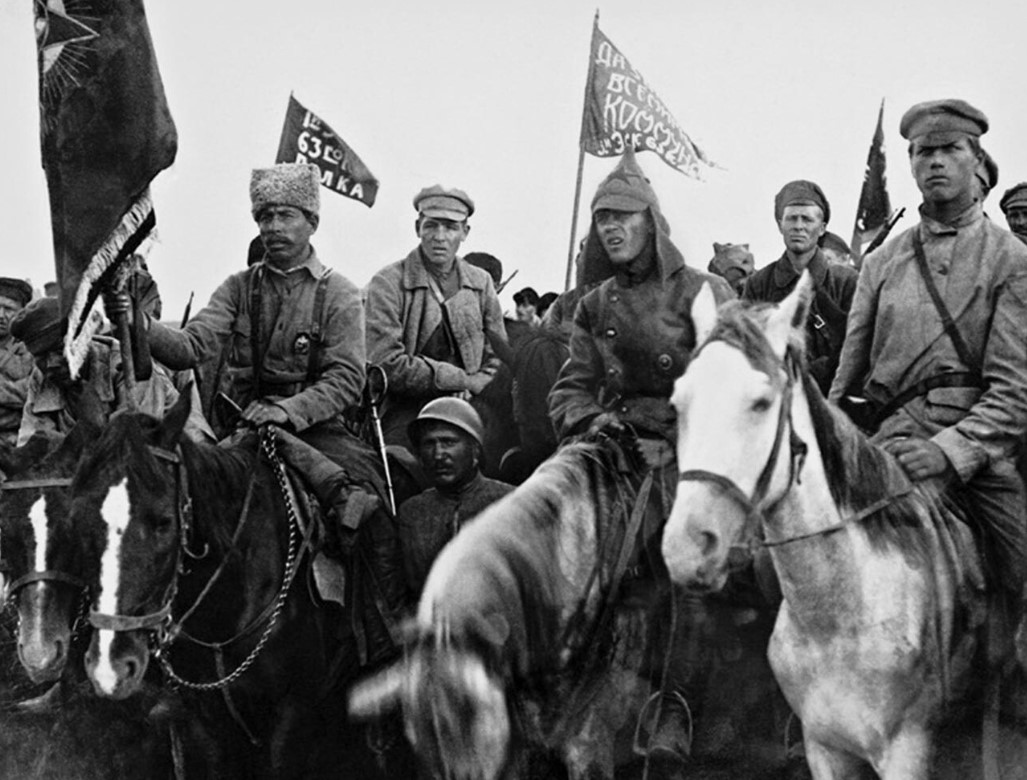
Red Cavalry Men

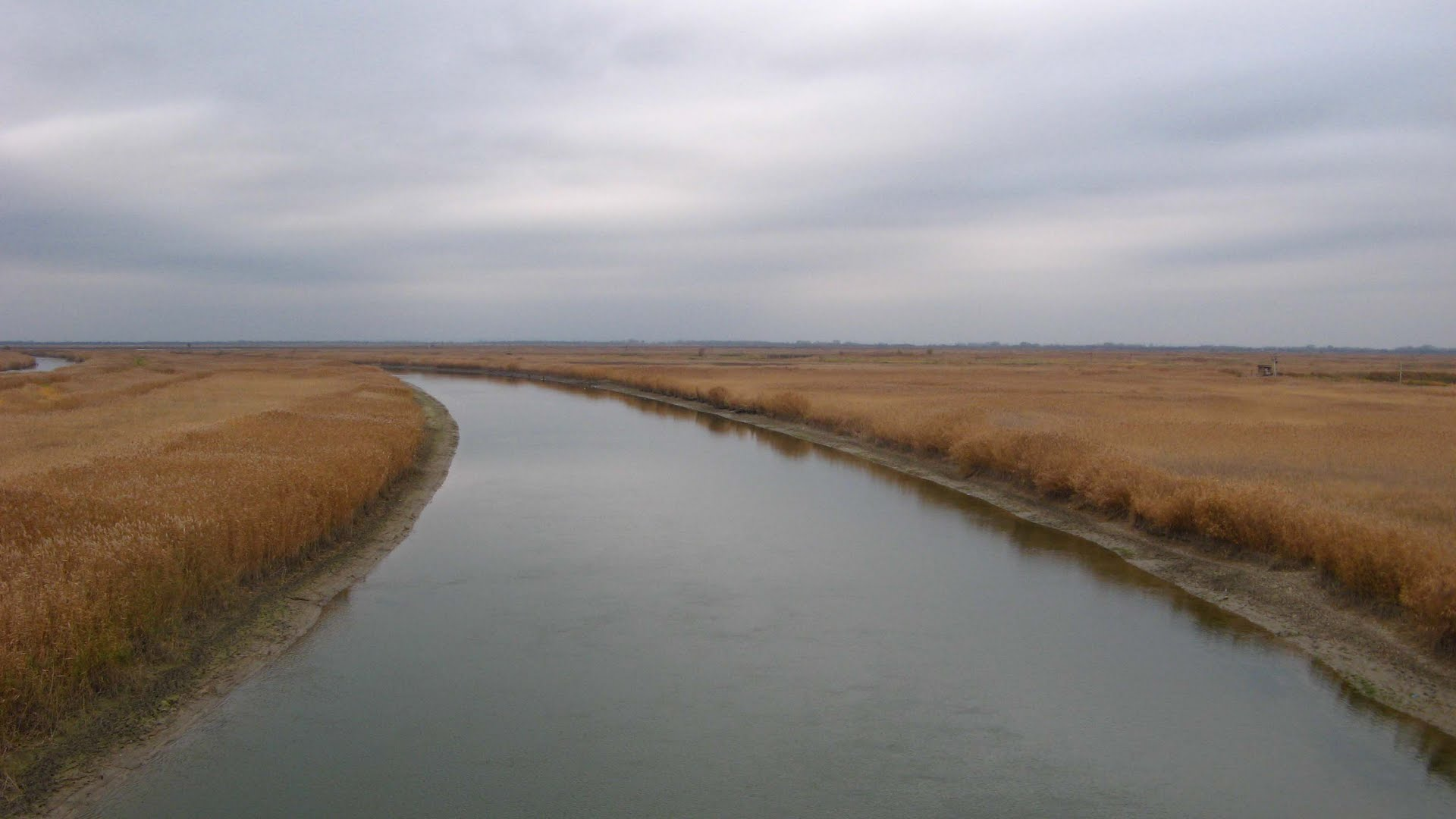
Manych River

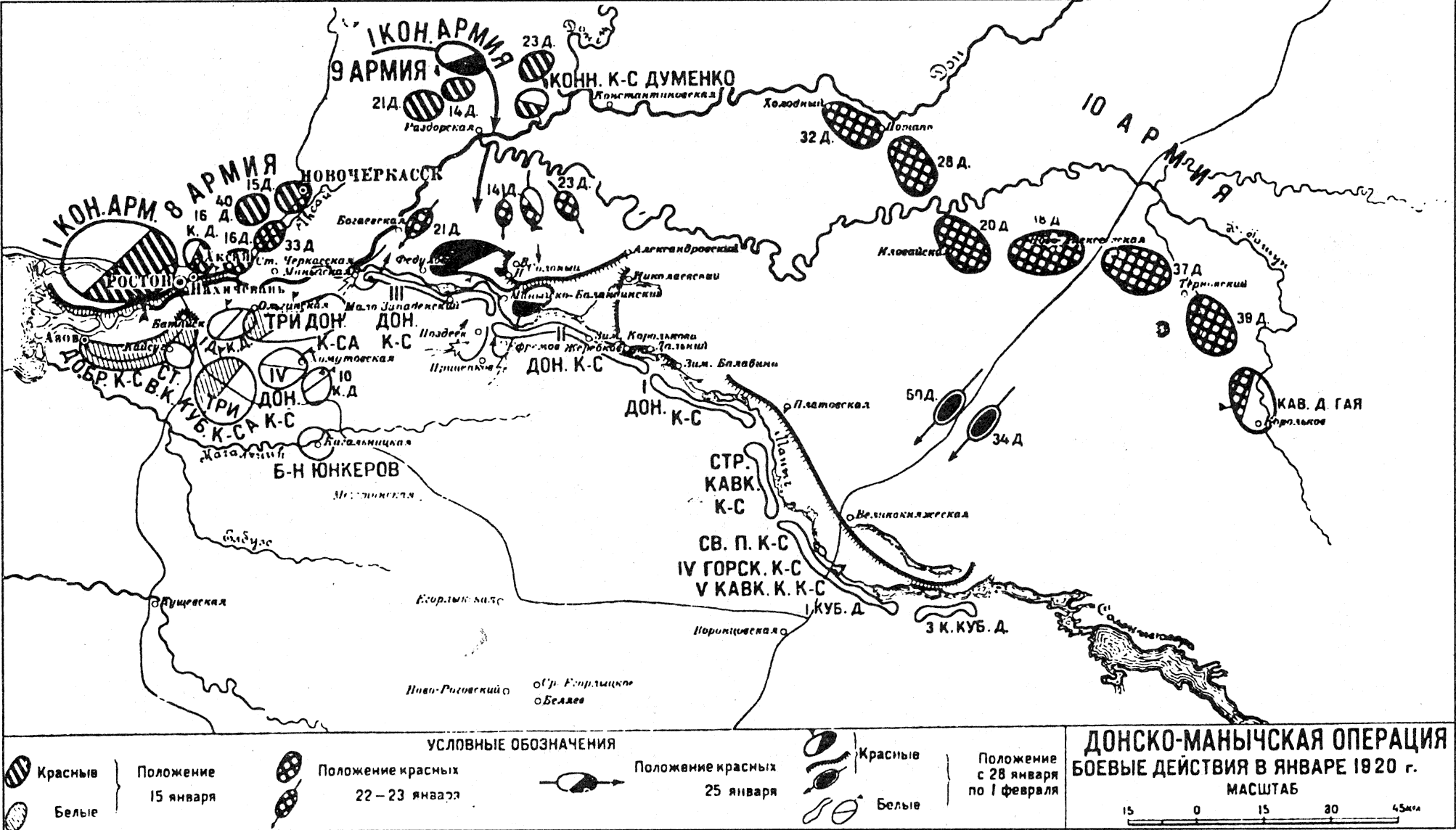
Map. Positions of the Red and Whites before the Tikhoretsk Operation

The White movement was willing to do everything in order to keep its power in the area and began a wave of mobilization. However, because of Bolshevik victories in Donbas and Rostov, mutinies were common, both to the Green Army and the Reds. Nevertheless, the Whites planned to launch an offensive in the Rostov-on-Don direction, but on the 14th, they were met with a Bolshevik attack (by the 10th Army) on the Manych. The 10th Army defeated the Kuban Army and was able to create a small bridgehead with its victory in the Battle of Torgoyava, which allowed the konarmia to cross the Manych. After receiving news of the Bolshevik breakthrough, Pavlov's Cavalry Group, on the 19th, rushed in order to kick them out but was met with heavy resistance and was forced back to Sredny Yegorlyk. During this battle, the 20th, 34th and 50th Rifle Divisions of the 10th Army were incorporated into a shock group of the konarmia.

On the 22nd of February, units of the shock group and parts of the Konarmia advanced in the southwestern direction and captured Belaya Glina, where they were able to gain information that Denikin's forces were retreating in an unorganized manner towards Pavlov's forces. Along with this information, the Reds gained the knowledge that the opposing forces had weakened the fronts with the 8th and 9th Armies, and the Bolsheviks became aware that they were planning on attacking the Bolsheviks at Sredny Yegorlyk.

== Course of the battle ==
The command of the 1st cavalry army had two possbile options as was laid out by future marshal of the red army, Budyonny:

We were faced with two possible solutions: first, by defeating the enemy group in the Sredniy Yegorlyk-Yegorlykskaya area, we would allow the troops of the 8th and 9th Armies to cross the Don and Manych Rivers and, together with them, launch a decisive offensive along the entire front. And second, by taking advantage of the defeat inflicted on the enemy at Belaya Glina, we would develop an offensive to the south, capture Tikhoretskaya Station, and strike at the rear of Denikin's troops operating in the Rostov direction.

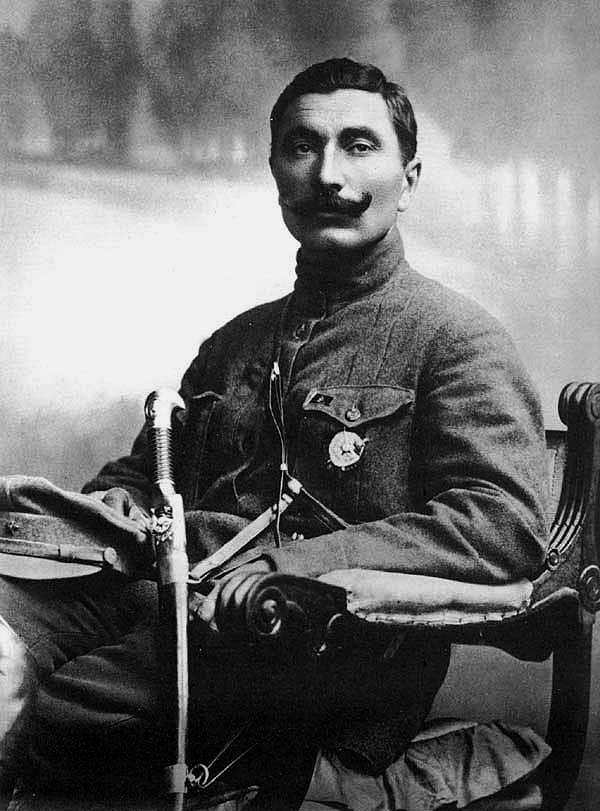
Semyon Budyonny.

The majority of the command of the Red Army decided on a sharp northward offensive towards Sredny Yegorlyk. On the 24th, the plan was organized and went as follows: the 6th Cavalry Division, led by Timoshenko, would advance through the village of Gorkaya Balka and attack the enemy in Sredny Yegorlyk. The 4th Cavalry Division was to advance behind the vanguard of the army and support the 6th Division by attacking the enemy in Sredny Yegorlyk from the south and southwest, and the 11th Cavalry Division was tasked with securing the right flank of the 20th and 50th Rifle Divisions and jointly attacking the enemy in Sredny Yegorlyk from the east and northeast. The 34th Rifle Division was to take up defensive positions in Belaya Glina, covering the Cavalry Army's operation from Tikhoretskaya.

At 7 a.m. on the 25th of February, the offensive began. At 10 a.m., the 6th Cavalry Division spotted a slow-moving White formation. This was, in fact, the 4th Don Corps of Pavlov's group. The Don Corps was totally unaware of the presence of the Red Army, believing that it had actually launched its offensive towards Tikhoretskaya, and advanced without reconnaissance. Timoshenko's cavalry division attacked and routed the force. In the meantime, the 2nd Don Corps, which was personally led by Pavlov, attacked the 20th Division and broke through its first echelon of defense. However, when the division commander, Oka Gorodovikov, learned of the breakthrough, he personally led the counterattack and defeated the White forces.

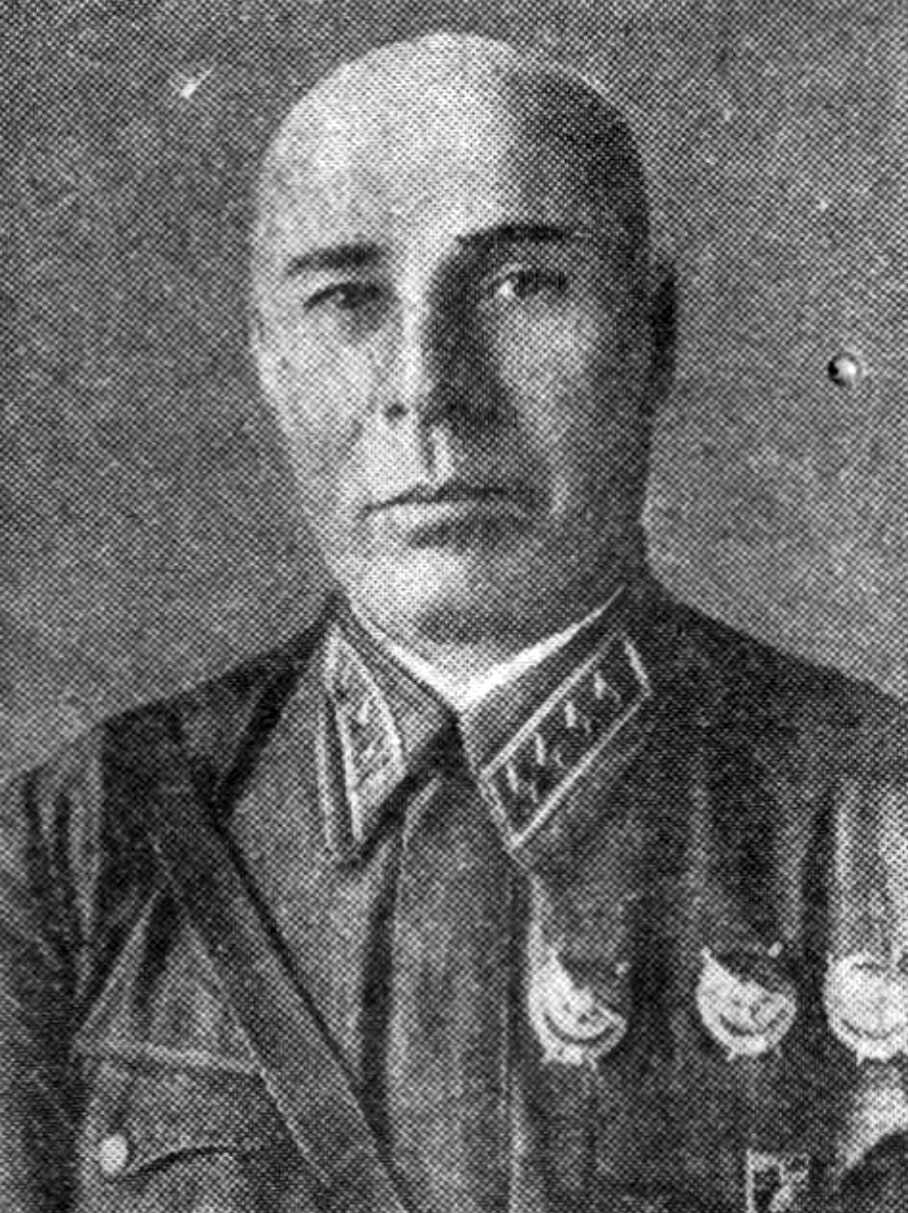
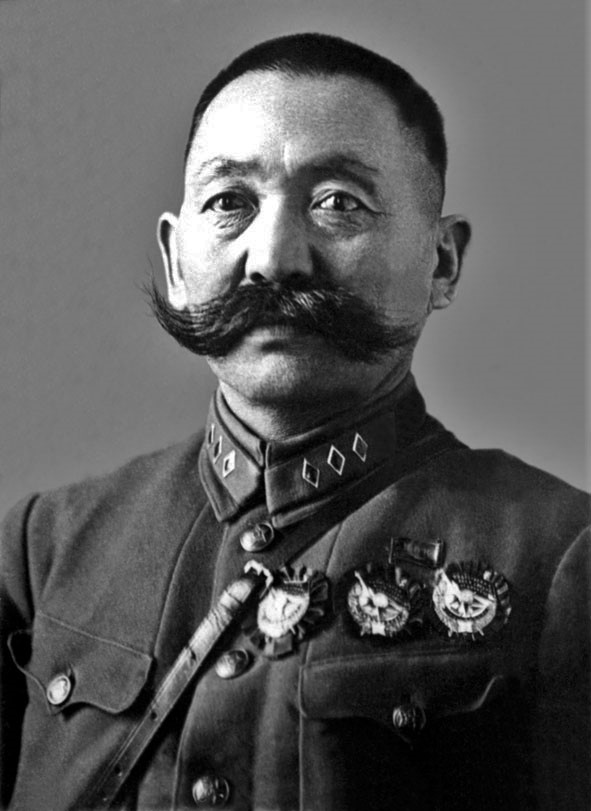
Commander of the 6th Cavalry Division, Semyon Timoshenko, on the left and commander of the 4th Cavalry Division, Oka Gorodovikov.

This was a major victory for the Reds. A telegram was sent at 11 p.m. by the Konarmia to the Caucasian Front, headed by Mikhail Tukhachevsky. The following day the Konarmia received the following radiogram:

The Revolutionary Military Council of the Caucasian Front congratulates you and the valiant units of the Cavalry Army on the glorious victory over the armies of the dying counterrevolution. The Revolutionary Military Council of the Front believes that the valiant Red Army, which has covered itself with unfading glory, will finally break the stubborn enemy and bring closer the hour of the final triumph of Soviet power throughout the Caucasus [...]

Map. Combat Path of the 6th Cavalry Divison

On the 26th, the Whites began withdrawing from the left bank of the Don. As a consequence of this, the 8th army crossed the Don river and only on the 29th did the 8th and 9th armies go on the offensive.

White Cossacks.

On the evening of February 29, the Revolutionary Military Council of the Cavalry Army decided to launch a vigorous attack on Ataman-Egorlykskaya on March 1, using the forces of the Cavalry Army and the 20th Rifle Division. The advance was difficult, but by 10 a.m., the Red Army had reached the village of Yegorlykskaya. Soon, the White Army began its attack on Red Army positions, with plans to overrun the cavalry divisions from their left flank.

Cossack machine guns started firing upon the 4th Division, followed by a cavalry attack that forced them to retreat. Because of this attack, the center of the Red positions was weakened, and the Whites took advantage of this by launching a "never-ending wave of White cavalry." The Whites were able to break through the Bolshevik positions; however, they were overextended, and Gorodovikov ordered the Red machine gunners and the horse artillery battalion to open fire at point-blank range on White positions. Dozens of White Cossacks fell dead on the damp spring steppe, trampled by thousands of Red hooves.

On March 1, the Whites got their reinforcements in order and attacked the Bolsheviks yet again, starting another massive cavalry clash.

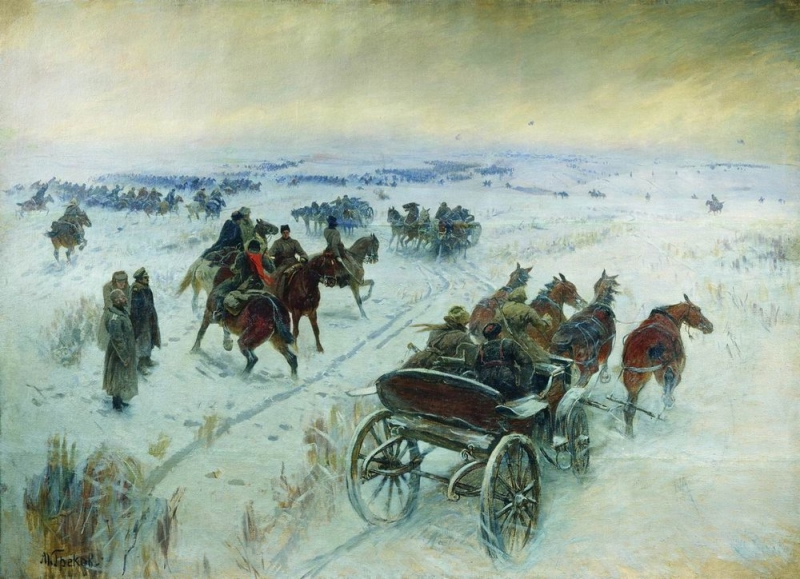
Бой при Егорлыкской by Mitrofan Grekov.

Map. Advances and troop movements of the RKKA from February to March

The Red Army had a total of 2,700 bayonets, 10,500 sabres, 62 guns, and 240 machine guns, while the White Army had a total of 13,000 sabres and 3,500 bayonets. At 10 a.m., the battle started with a firefight and then escalated into an artillery duel. The Reds attacked and were met with brutal resistance from the White forces. The Whites stubbornly resisted and repeatedly counterattacked with cavalry, the outcome was unclear to both sides as the battle went back and forth but the Bolsheviks were able to advance and defeat the Cossacks. The following events are described by Budyonny as follows:

The bearded Cossacks, despite their advanced age, ran so briskly that even young men would have envied their speed in better times. Well, now there was nothing to envy. The Cossacks' "marathon run" brought them only shame. Running in the muddy conditions was difficult, especially considering that the White Cossacks were dressed warmly for winter. Pursued by the Cavalry, they abandoned their felt boots in the mud and fled barefoot.

Замёрзшие казаки генерала Павлова by Mitrofan Grekov

Despite the defeat of the Whites in this battle and the Tikhoretsk Operation as a whole the advance of the Konarmia and the Shock group of the 10th Army, the advance, according to Budyonny, was stopped because of the arrival of a warm spring which brought "impassable mud". Along with this another problem came to the light, after the continuation of the Southwards Offensive of the Red Army, their forces were totally exhausted at began to rest in the village of Yegorlykskaya. In the meanwhile a series of reorganisations began.

Map. Collapse of Denikinichina

As a result of this battle the main cavalry force of the white movement was routed and the Red Army launched an offensive on the entire front (Kuban–Novorossiysk Operation). The losses on the whites vary a lot. White casualties vary from 4000 and 7000 with 500 killed and injured and over 1000 captured in the battle of the 25th. The losses for the reds remain unknown but they are in the thousands.

Over the course of this battle, the 8th and 9th armies were criticized by Budyonny for their lack of initiative in pinning the White forces and forcing the Cavalry Army along with its Shock Group to do all of the heavy fighting.

== Order of Battle ==
=== Soviet Russia (RKKA) ===
Red Army	Unit	Russian name	Commander
Caucasian Front – Gen. Mikhail Tukhachevsky
1st Cavalry Army (Koniarmia) Semyon Budyonny	4th Cavalry Divison	4-я кавалерийская дивизия	Oka Gorodovikov
1st Cavalry Army (Koniarmia) Semyon Budyonny	6th Cavalry Division	6-я кавалерийская дивизия	Semyon Timoshenko
1st Cavalry Army (Koniarmia) Semyon Budyonny	11th Cavalry Division	11-я кавалерийская дивизия	Konstantin Ivanovich
10th Army Mikhail Velikanov	20th Rifle Divison	20-я стрелковая дивизия	
10th Army Mikhail Velikanov	34th Rifle Divison	34-я стрелковая дивизия	
10th Army Mikhail Velikanov	50th Rifle Divison	50-я стрелковая дивизия	
10th Army Mikhail Velikanov	1st Caucasian Cavalry Division	1-я Кавказская кавалерийская дивизия	Gaia Gai
10th Army Mikhail Velikanov	2nd Cavalry Divison	2-я кавалерийская дивизия	Ivan Andreevich

=== South Russia (AFSR) ===
AFSR	Unit	Russian name	Commander
Armed Forces of Southern Russia – "Supreme Ruler of Russia" Anton Denikin
Pavlov's Cavalry Group A. Alexandrovich Pavlov	2nd Don Cavalry Corps	2-й Донской конный корпус	A. S. Sekretev
Pavlov's Cavalry Group A. Alexandrovich Pavlov	4th Don Cavalry Corps	4-й Донской конный корпус	I. D. Popov (February); T. M. Starikov (March)
Kuban Army (1920) Andrei Shkuro	1st Kuban Corps	1-й Кубанский корпус	Vladimir Vasilievich
Kuban Army (1920) Andrei Shkuro	2nd Kuban Divison	2-я Кубанская дивизия	
Kuban Army (1920) Andrei Shkuro	Astrakhan Divison	Астраханская дивизия	
Kuban Army (1920) Andrei Shkuro	Gorskaya Divison	Горская дивизия	
Don Army Anatoliy Keltchevski	1st Don Corps	1-й Донской корпус	T.M. Starikov
Don Army Anatoliy Keltchevski	2nd Don Corps	2-й Донской корпус	A.M. Sutulov
Don Army Anatoliy Keltchevski	3rd Don Corps	3-й Донской корпус	A.K. Guselytsykov
Don Army Anatoliy Keltchevski	4th Don Corps	4-й Донской корпус	Popov I.D (February); Starikov T.M. (March)
Don Army Anatoliy Keltchevski	Volunteer Corps	Добровольческий корпус	Alexander Kutepov

== Bibliography ==
- Mikhailovich, Semen (1958). The Path Traveled. Moscow, Russia RSFR: Voenizdat.
- Kakurin, Nikolai (2002). Civil War 1918–1921. Saint Petersburg, Russia: Polygon. ISBN 5-89173-150-9.
- Tyulenev, Ivan (1972). Through Three Wars. Voenizdat.
