= Obolensk, Moscow Oblast =

Obolensk Оболенск
- Urban-type settlement
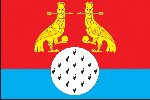
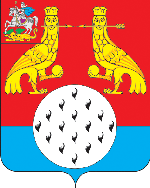
- Flag Coat of arms
- Interactive map of Obolensk
- Location of Obolensk Obolensk (Moscow Oblast)
- Coordinates: 54.9742°N 37.2235°E
- Country: Russia
- Federal subject: Moscow Oblast
- Administrative district: Serpukhovsky District
- Founded: 1975

Population (2010 Census)
  - Total: 4,937
  - Estimate (2023): 4,096 (−17%)
- Time zone: UTC+3 (MSK)
- Postal code: 142279
- OKTMO ID: 46651152051

Obolensk (Russian: Оболенск) is an urban locality (an urban-type settlement) in Serpukhovsky District of Moscow Oblast, Russia. Population: 4,937 (2010 census); 5,458 (2002 census);
