= Proletarsky District =

Proletarsky District may refer to:

- Proletarsky District, Russia, several districts and city districts in Russia
- Proletarskyi Raion (Donetsk) (Proletarsky District), a city district of Donetsk, Ukraine
