= Proletarsk =

Disambiguation page for Proletarsk:

- Proletarsk, Rostov Oblast, a town in Proletarsky District of Rostov Oblast; 46°42′N 41°44′E
- Proletarsk, Bryansk Oblast, a selo in Desyatukhovsky Rural Administrative Okrug of Starodubsky District in Bryansk Oblast; 52°36′N 32°59′E
- PROLETARSK (IMO: 7801910) is a General Cargo vessel sailing under the flag of Russia
