= Semyon Budyonny =

Soviet military commander (1883–1973)

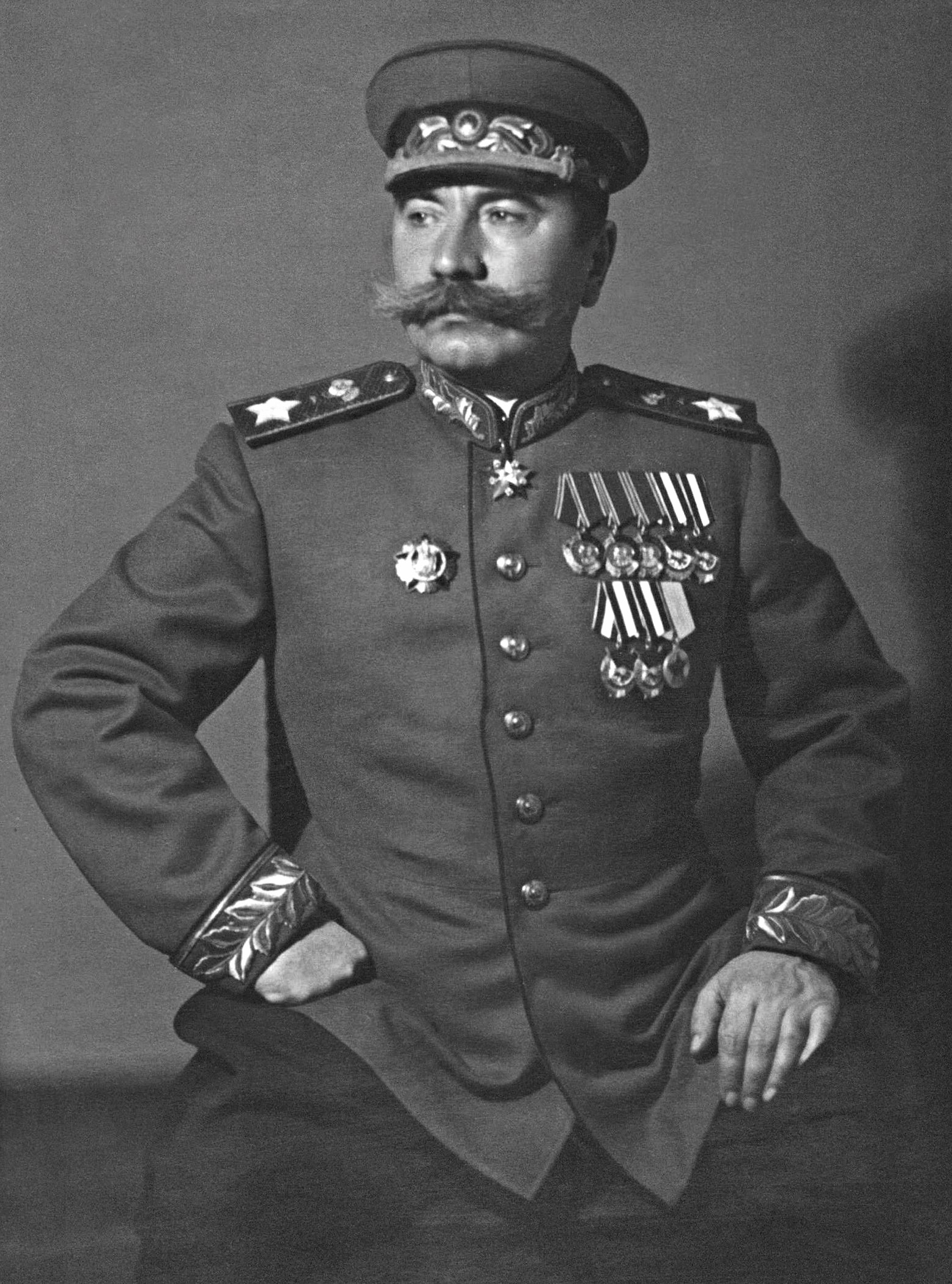
- Budyonny in 1943
- Born: Semyon Mikhailovich Budyonnyy; 25 April 1883; Platovskaya, Don Host Oblast, Russia
- Died: 26 October 1973 (aged 90); Moscow, Russian SFSR, Soviet Union
- Burial place: Kremlin Wall Necropolis
- Military career
- Allegiance: Russian Empire (1903–1917); Russian SFSR (1917–1922); Soviet Union (1922–1954)
- Branch: Imperial Russian Army; Red Army; Soviet Army
- Service years: 1903–1954
- Rank: Marshal of the Soviet Union (1935–1954)
- Commands: 1st Cavalry Army; Moscow Military District; Southwestern Direction: Southern Front; Southwestern Front; Reserve Front; North Caucasus Front
- Conflicts: Russo-Japanese War; World War I; Russian Civil War; Civil War on the Don; Battle of Tsaritsyn; Second Battle of Tsaritsyn; Third Battle of Tsaritsyn; Advance on Moscow (1919); October Counteroffensive; Orel–Kursk operation; Voronezh–Kastornoye operation (1919); Kharkiv Operation (December 1919); Rostov–Novocherkassk Operation; North Caucasus Operation (1920); Don-Manych Operation (1920); Tikhoretsk Operation (1920); Battle of Yegorlyk; Kuban-Novorossiysk Operation; Final Operations againts Wrangelshchina; Northern Taurida Operation; Perekop-Chongar Operation; Polish–Soviet War; Kiev offensive (1920); Battle of Zhytomyr (1920); Basmachi Movement; Kara-Kum Desert Campaign (1927); World War II; Battle of Uman; Battle of Kiev
- Awards: Hero of the Soviet Union (three times); Cross of St. George, 1st–4th Classes
- Other work: Communist Party of the Soviet Union (1919–1973)

Semyon Mikhailovich Budyonny (Russian: Семён Миха́йлович Будённый, romanized: Semyon Mikháylovich Budyonnyy, IPA: [sʲɪˈmʲɵn mʲɪˈxajləvʲɪdʑ bʊˈdʲɵnːɨj]; 25 April [O.S. 13 April] 1883 – 26 October 1973) was a Russian and Soviet cavalryman, military commander during the Russian Civil War, Polish–Soviet War and World War II, and politician, who was a close political ally of Soviet leader Joseph Stalin.

Born to a poor peasant family from the Don Cossack region in southern Russia, Budyonny was drafted into the Imperial Russian Army in 1903. He served with distinction in a dragoon regiment during the First World War, earning all four classes of the Cross of St. George. When the Russian Civil War broke out Budyonny founded the Red Cavalry, which played an important role in the Bolshevik victory; Budyonny became renowned and was the subject of several popular songs. In 1922 he also became commander of all the troops in the north Caucasian military district. While serving as inspector of the Red Army's cavalry (1924–37) and commander of the Moscow military district (1937–40), as a political ally of Joseph Stalin, he became one of the original five Marshals of the Soviet Union. He was one of the two most senior army commanders that survived the Great Purge and in post at the time of German invasion of the USSR in 1941. After the Soviet forces under Budyonny's command were routed in the battles of Kiev and Uman, he was removed from frontline command. He received the blame for many of Stalin's military strategic errors in the early part of World War II, but he was retained in the Soviet high command. In 1953 he resumed his post of inspector of the cavalry.

Budyonny was a staunch proponent of horse cavalry. During the Great Purge, he testified against Mikhail Tukhachevsky's efforts to create an independent tank corps, claiming that it was so inferior to cavalry and illogical that it amounted to "wrecking" (sabotage). After being told of the importance of the tank in the coming war in 1939, he remarked, "You won't convince me. As soon as war is declared, everyone will shout, 'Send for the Cavalry!'"

== Early life ==
Budyonny was born into a poor peasant family on the Kozyurin farmstead near the town of Salsk in the Don Cossack region of the southern Russian Empire (now Rostov Oblast). Budyonny's family stemmed from Voronezh province, formerly part of Sloboda Ukraine, and was likely of Ukrainian descent (the Ukrainian word буденний - budenny can be translated as "everyday" or "common"). He worked as a farm labourer, shop errand boy, blacksmith's apprentice, and driver of a steam-driven threshing machine, until the autumn of 1903, when he was drafted into the Imperial Russian Army.

He became a cavalryman reinforcing the 46th Cossack Regiment during the Russo-Japanese War of 1904–1905. After the war, he was transferred to the Primorsk Dragoon Regiment. In 1907, he was sent to the Academy for Cavalry Officers in the St. Petersburg Riding School. He graduated first in his class after a year, becoming an instructor with the rank of junior non-commissioned officer. He returned to his regiment as a riding instructor with a rank of senior non-commissioned officer. At the start of World War I, he joined a reserve dragoon cavalry battalion.

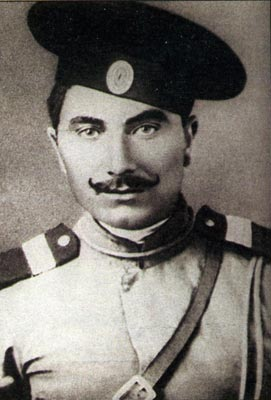
Budyonny in 1912

== World War I ==
During World War I, Budyonny was the 5th Squadron's non-commissioned troop officer in the Christian IX of Denmark 18th Seversky Dragoon Regiment, Caucasian Cavalry Division on the Eastern Front. He became famous for his attack on a German supply column near Brzeziny, and was awarded the St. George Cross, 4th Class. However, there was general ineptitude among the officers under whom he served (primarily Caucasian aristocrats who received commissions based on their social standing).

In November 1916, the Caucasian Cavalry Division was transferred to the Caucasus Front, to fight against the Ottoman Turks. He was involved in a heated confrontation with the squadron sergeant major regarding the officers' poor treatment of the soldiers and the continual lack of food. The sergeant major struck out at Budyonny, who retaliated by punching the ranking officer, knocking him down. The soldiers backed Budyonny during questioning, claiming that the sergeant major was kicked by a horse. Budyonny was stripped of his St. George Cross, though he could have faced a court martial and death.

Budyonny would go on to be awarded the St. George Cross, 4th class, a second time, during the Battle of Van. He received the St. George Cross, 3rd class, fighting the Turks near Mendelij, on the way to Baghdad. He then received the St. George Cross, 2nd class, for operating behind Turkish lines for 22 days. He received the St. George Cross, 1st class, for capturing a senior non-commissioned officer and six men.

== The Red Cavalry ==
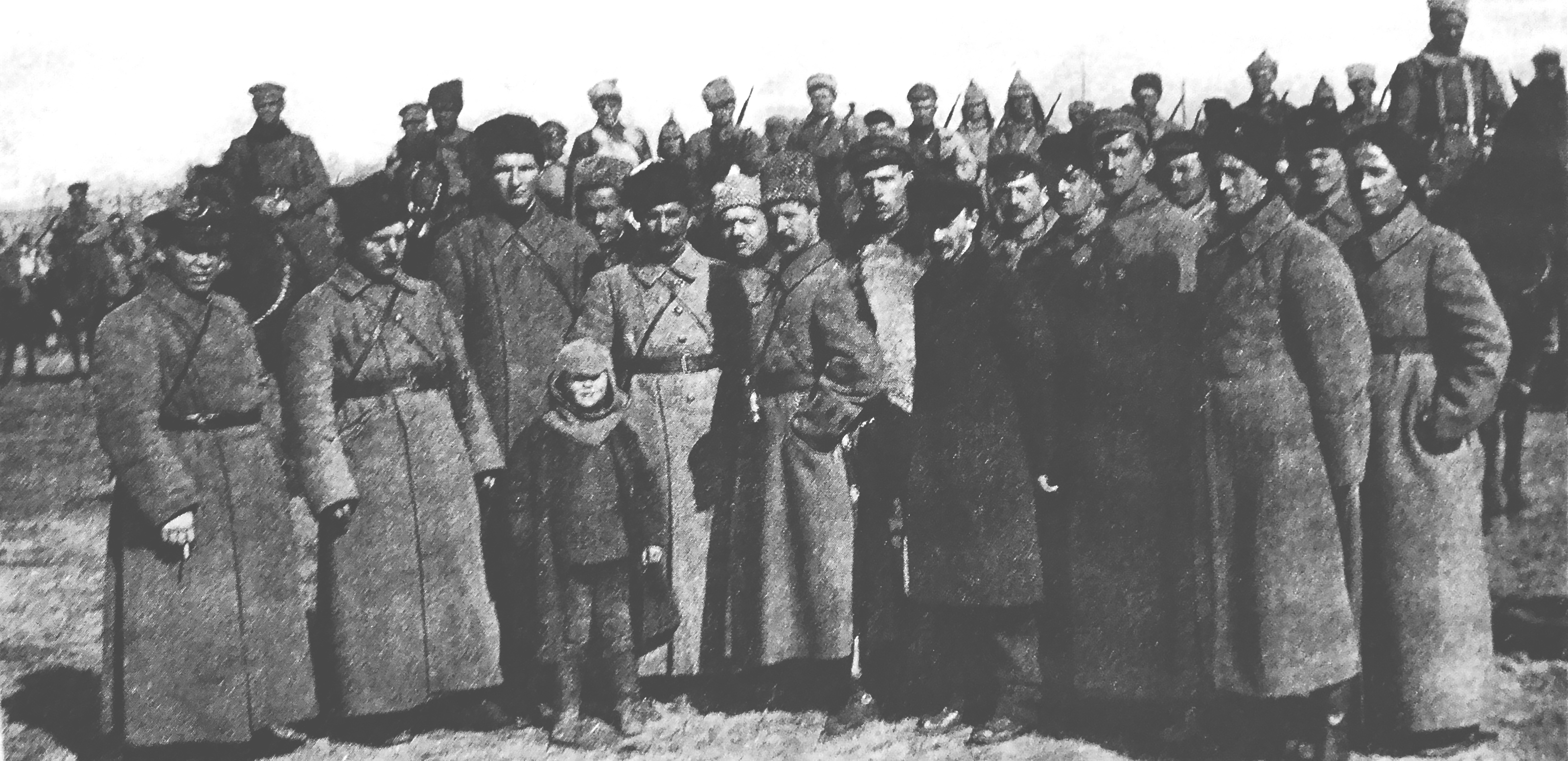
Kliment Voroshilov, Budyonny, Mikhail Frunze and Nikolai Bukharin with the 1st Cavalry Army in Novomoskovsk, 1921

After the February Revolution overthrew the Tsarist regime in 1917, Budyonny was elected chairman of the squadron committee and a member of the regimental committee. When the Caucasian Cavalry Division was moved to Minsk, he was elected chairman of the regimental committee and deputy chairman of the divisional committee.

Returning to Platovskaya, Budyonny was elected deputy chairman of the Stanitsa Soviet of Workers', Peasants', Cossacks' and Soldiers' Deputies on 12 January 1918. On 18 February, he was elected to be a member of the Salsk District Presidium and head of the District Land Department. On the night of 23 February, Budyonny organized a force of 24 men to retake Platovskaya from the white guards, but was soon joined by a large number of new recruits. By morning, they had killed 350 White Russian soldiers. His force now consisted of 520 men, from whom, on 27 February, he formed what was later recognised as the first 120-strong squadron of red cavalry. Eventually he was elected battalion commander. Budyonny met Stalin and Voroshilov in July 1918. Both supported the idea of creating a cavalry corps to fight on the Bolshevik side in the Russian Civil War; but when Leon Trotsky, the People's Commissar for War, visited south Russia soon afterward, he told Budyonny that cavalry was "a very aristocratic family of troops, commanded by princes, barons, and counts."

Despite Trotsky's objections, the 1st Socialist Cavalry Regiment was formed in Tsaritsyn in October 1918, commanded by Boris Dumenko, with Budyonny as deputy commander. Budyonny joined the Communist Party of the Soviet Union (CPSU) in 1919. During the summer of 1919, while the Red Cavalry were in action against the White General Anton Denikin, Trotsky described them contempuously as "Budyonny's corps — a horde, and Budyonny — their Ataman ring leader...He is today's Stenka Razin, and where he leads his gang, there will they go: for the Reds today, tomorrow for the Whites."

However, in October 1919, Budyonny pulled off a spectacular victory when, at the battle of Voronezh, he attacked and defeated the White Army corps commanded by Konstantin Mamontov. On 25 October, Trotsky sent a dispatch forecasting that the White Army in the south would never recover from this defeat, and hailing Budyonny as "a true warrior of the workers and peasants".

== Polish–Soviet War ==
When Poland declared independence, there was no agreement between its government and the Soviet authorities over where the border would be. In April 1920, Budyonny's cavalry was assigned to driving the Polish army out of Ukraine. On 5 June, he took part in recapturing Kiev, and over the next few days successfully drove the Poles westward. At the start of the war with Poland, he was assigned to the southern front, which Stalin commanded. On 15 August, he asked the commander-in-chief of Soviet forces in Poland, Mikhail Tukhachevsky, for authority to swing north and assist in capturing Warsaw. With Stalin's agreement, he attempted to capture Lviv first. Unsuccessful, he eventually diverted to the North but by that time Tukhachevsky's forces had been driven back, forcing a general retreat. After Budyonny's army was defeated in the Battle of Komarów (one of the biggest cavalry battles in history), he was forced to withdraw onto Soviet-held territory.

Budyonny took part in the reconquest of Crimea, the final phase of the Russian Civil War.

== Reputation ==
Despite the defeat in Poland, Budyonny was one of Soviet Russia's military heroes by the end of the Civil War. With Semyon Timoshenko and Kliment Voroshilov he was one of the Cavalry Army clique leaders, and a supporter of Stalin.

In 1920, Soviet songwriter Dmitry Pokrass wrote the song "Budyonny's March", which was one of the first songs to become widely popular throughout the Soviet Union.

The writer Isaac Babel rode with Budyonny's cavalry in Poland, and published a series of short stories about the experience, which achieved worldwide acclaim as one of the greatest contributions to Soviet literature – but which offended Budyonny, who made a "rare and furious foray into print" in March 1924, demanding that the Red Cavalry's reputation should be protected against "slander" by a "literary degenerate". This provoked a response from Maxim Gorky, then the most famous living Russian writer, defending Babel, but in 1928, Budyonny returned to the attack in an open letter to Gorky accusing Babel of "crude, deliberate and arrogant slander", which Gorky said was an "undeserved insult".

William Reswick, a correspondent for the American agency AP, described a celebration backstage at an opera house around the 10th anniversary of the revolution, at which:

Budyonny, the celebrated cavalry, an amateur dancer and admirer of the ballet joined us. He was in high spirits. After helping himself to some vodka, he offered to outdance any professional in the Kamarinskaya. Ballerina Abramova took up the challenge. Thereupon Budyonny called over a harmonic player and went into a spin, cutting a Cossack caper with the ease and grace of a youngster.

== Later military career ==
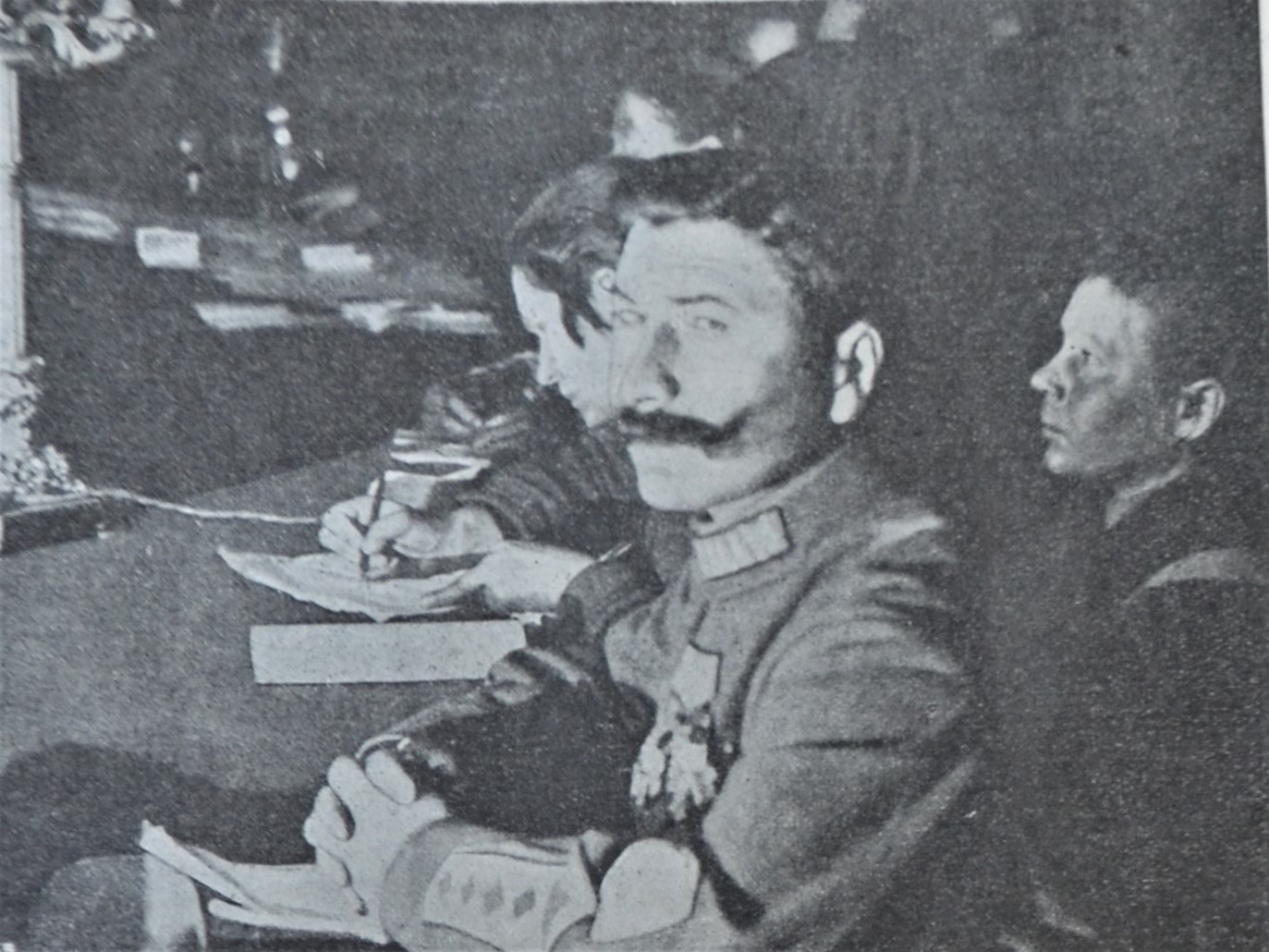
Semyon Budyonny celebrates International Women's Day at the House of Unions on March 8, 1924.

From 1921 to 1923, Budyonny was deputy commander of the North Caucasian Military District. In 1923, Budyonny arrived in Chechnya with a proclamation from the Central Executive Committee announcing the formation of the Chechen Autonomous Region. The same year, he was also appointed assistant commander of the Red Army's cavalry. During 1924–37, he was Inspector of Cavalry of the Red Army. He spent a great amount of time and effort in the organization and management of equestrian facilities and developing new breeds of horses.

Budyonny was considered a courageous and colourful cavalry officer, but displayed disdain for the tools of modern warfare, particularly tanks, which he, along with Grigory Kulik, saw as "incapable of ever replacing cavalry". This brought him into direct conflict with Tukhachevsky, who was in charge of weapons development, and foresaw the imminence of mechanized warfare. Even after Tukhachevsky's arrest, the Red Army never stopped developing large scale mechanized corps, and each front had numerous such corps attached as a second echelon force by 1940–41, but Budyonny was never criticised for being on the wrong side of the argument, being a faithful ally of Stalin and Voroshilov.

Budyonny graduated from the M. V. Frunze Military Academy in 1932. In 1934, he was made a candidate member of the Central Committee of the Communist Party of the Soviet Union.

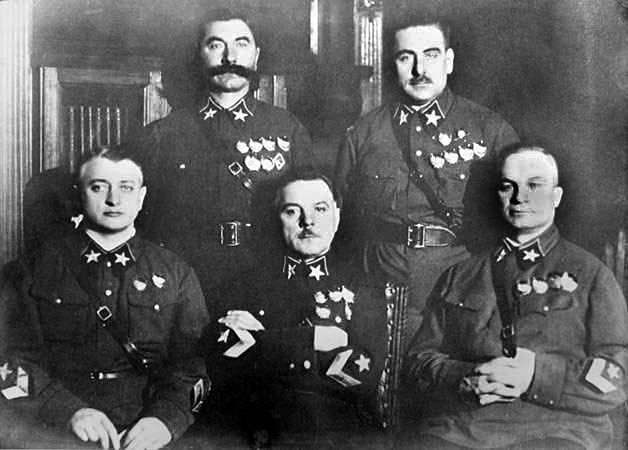
The first five Marshals of the Soviet Union in November 1935, clockwise from top left: Semyon Budyonny, Vasily Blyukher, Alexander Ilyich Yegorov, Kliment Voroshilov and Mikhail Tukhachevsky. Only Budyonny and Voroshilov would survive Stalin's Great Purge.

In 1935 Budyonny was made one of the first five Marshals of the Soviet Union. Three of these five were executed in the Great Purge of the late 1930s, leaving only Budyonny and Voroshilov.

== Role in the Great Purge ==
Early in the Great Purge, Budyonny was appointed commander of the Moscow Military District, possibly because Stalin was nervous that there would be a military coup after he had decided to move against two of the most popular Bolsheviks, Nikolai Bukharin and Alexei Rykov. When Bukharin was trying to defend himself, during a plenum of the Central Committee of the Communist Party of the Soviet Union, on 26 February 1937, Budyonny barracked him, calling him a Jesuit.

On 24 May 1937, Budyonny was copied into a resolution proposing to arrest Marshal Tukhachevsky, and the high-ranking party official Janis Rudzutaks. He wrote on it: "It's necessary to finish off this scum."

On 11 June, he was one of the judges at the trial of Tukhachevsky and seven other Red Army commanders, whose execution was the start of a massive purge of the Red Army officer corps. At the trial, he provided testimony that Tukhachevsky's efforts to create an independent tank corps was so inferior to horse cavalry and so illogical that it amounted to deliberate "wrecking". Half a century after the trial, the Soviet authorities admitted that all eight defendants were innocent. The 'evidence' consisted of confessions forced out of them under torture. Two weeks after their execution, Budyonny sent a memo to Voroshilov disclosing that Tukhachevsky initially withdrew his confession, yet Budyonny concluded that all eight were "patented spies ... since 1931, and a few of them even earlier were worming their way into our ranks ever since the beginning of the revolution" .

Later, as the Great Purge continued, the NKVD came to interrogate and arrest Budyonny; Budyonny's response was to arm himself with his service Nagant M1895 revolver and call Stalin to demand he have the agents removed. Stalin complied and the event was not discussed again.

By December 1937, Budyonny had been allocated a large dacha with orchards, raspberry and gooseberry bushes, a workhorse, a black cow and a pig weighing 250 kilograms (550 lb).

== Second World War service ==
In July–September 1941, Budyonny was Commander-in-Chief (главком, glavkom) of the Soviet armed forces of the Southwestern Direction (Southwestern and Southern Fronts) facing the German invasion of Ukraine. This invasion began as part of Germany's Operation Barbarossa which was launched on June 22. He also served as an original member of the Stavka of the Supreme High Command, the highest Soviet body of military command during the Great Patriotic War, from the start of the war until February 17, 1945. Operating under strict orders from Stalin (who attempted to micromanage the war in the early stages) not to retreat under any circumstances, Budyonny's forces were eventually surrounded during the Battle of Uman and the Battle of Kiev by Nazi forces. The disasters which followed the encirclement cost the Soviet Union 1.5 million men killed or taken prisoner. This was the largest encirclement in military history.

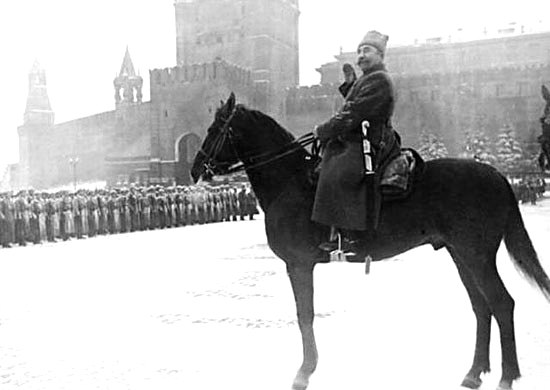
Budyonny at the 1941 October Revolution Parade

On 13 September 1941, Stalin sacked Budyonny as a scapegoat, replacing him with Semyon Timoshenko. He was never allowed to command troops in combat again. First he was put in charge of the Reserve Front (September–October 1941), then made Commander-in-Chief of the troops in the North Caucasus Direction (April–May, 1942), Commander of the North Caucasus Front (May–August, 1942) - but was removed from this post as the Germans approached, and appointed Cavalry Inspector of the Red Army (from 1943), as well as various honorific posts.

Despite his bravery as a cavalry commander, the view of his fellow officers was that Budyonny was demonstrably incompetent at commanding an army in a mechanized war. Soon after the war, Marshal Konev told the Yugoslav communist, Milovan Đilas: "Budyonny never knew much, and he never studied anything. He showed himself to be completely incompetent and permitted awful mistakes to be made." German Field Marshal Rundstedt, commander of Army Group South in the battles of Kiev and Uman, said after the war: "Of Budyonny, who commanded the armies facing me, a captured Russian officer aptly remarked — ‘He is a man with a very large moustache, but a very small brain.’"

Because of his exceptional Civil War record and public popularity, he continued to enjoy Stalin's patronage and suffered no real punishment for the disaster in Kiev.

== Post-war career ==
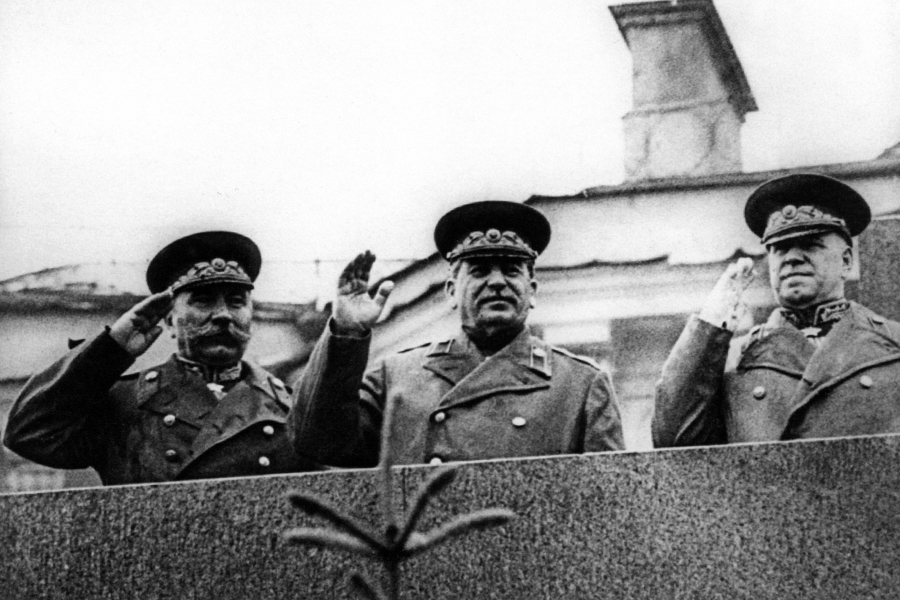
Budyonny (left), Stalin (center), and Georgy Zhukov (right) during the 1945 Moscow Victory Parade

After the war, Budyonny was appointed deputy Minister of Agriculture of the USSR, responsible, among other things, for horse breeding. When he retired, he retained his membership of the Supreme Soviet of the Soviet Union.

Budyonny died of brain hemorrhage on 26 October 1973, at the age of 90. He was buried with full military honours in the Kremlin Wall Necropolis, in one of the twelve individual tombs located between the Lenin Mausoleum and the Kremlin Wall. Pallbearers at his funeral included the General Secretary of the CPSU Leonid Brezhnev and the USSR Minister for Defence, Marshal Grechko.

== Other contributions and legacy ==
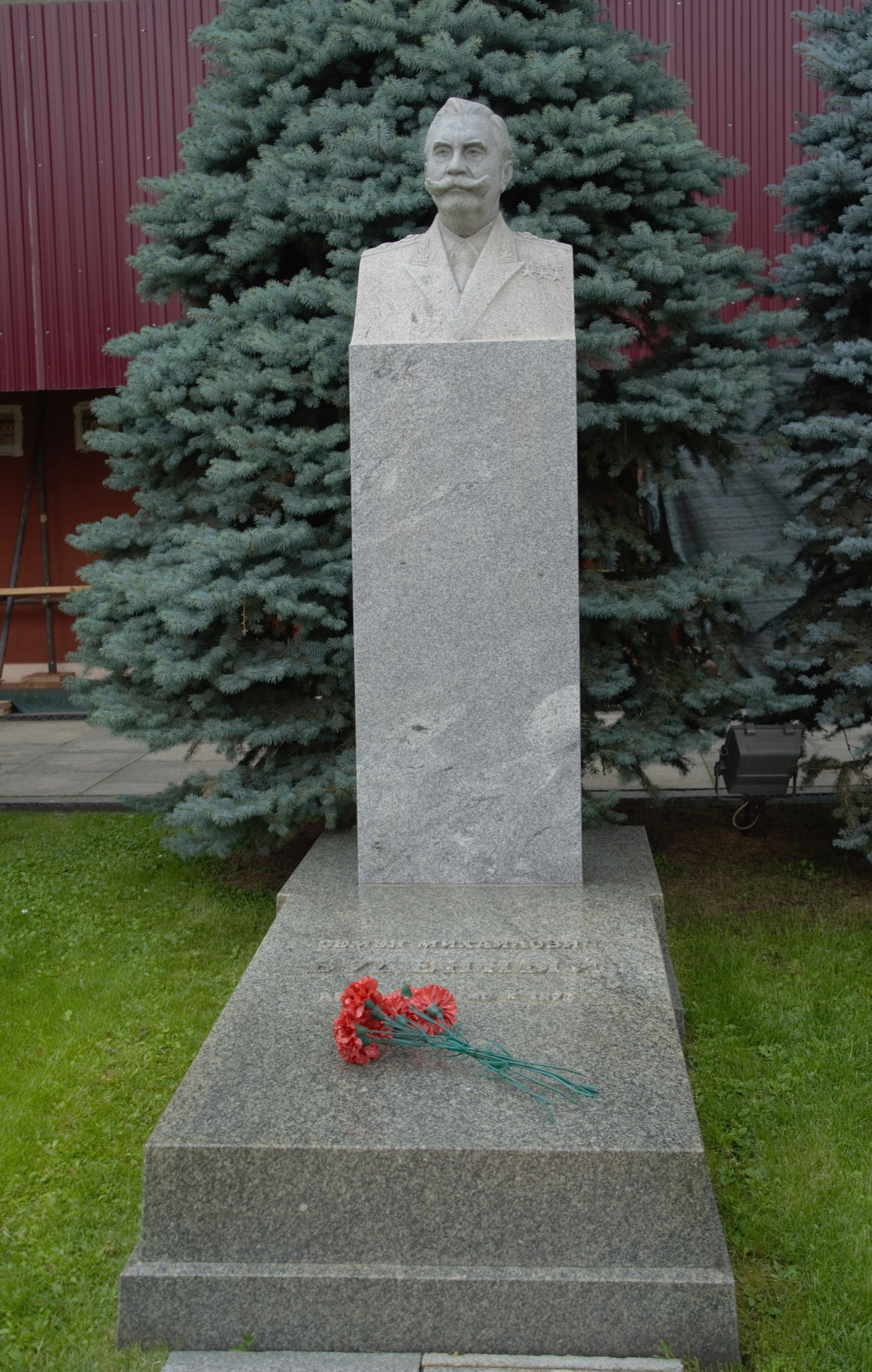
Budyonny's tomb in the Kremlin Wall Necropolis

Budyonny wrote a five-volume memoir, in which he described the stormy years of civil war as well as the everyday life of the First Cavalry Army. He was frequently commemorated for his bravery in many popular Soviet military songs, including The Red Cavalry song (Konarmieyskaya) and The Budyonny March. Budenovka, a part of Soviet military uniform, is named after Semyon Budyonny. He was also frequently named in the cavalry-oriented works of Isaac Babel. Babel had originally begun covering Budyonny as a writer for a Soviet newspaper during the Polish–Soviet War.

Budyonny, who was a renowned horse breeder, also created a new horse breed that is still kept in large numbers in Russia: the Budyonny horse, which is famous for its high performance in sports and endurance.

Semyon Budyonny was also an amateur bayan player; a few instrumental vinyl records were issued in the USSR featuring a duo with his friend, cossack bayanist Grigory Zaytsev, titled as "Duo of bayanists" (Дуэт баянистов).

The Military Academy of the Signal Corps in St. Petersburg carries the name of honour S. M. Budyonny.

== Personal life ==
Budyonny's first wife was an illiterate Cossack whose forename and patronymic were Nadezhda Ivanovna. They were married in 1903, immediately before he joined the army. He did not see her for seven years. After the Bolshevik revolution, she travelled with the Red Cavalry, organising food and medical supplies. In 1920–23, the couple lived with the Voroshilovs in Yekaterinoslav. They moved to Moscow in 1923.

In 1924, Nadezhda Ivanovna was killed by a gunshot. Her death led to numerous stories. Mikhail Soloviev, a Soviet army officer who settled in the west after being captured early in the German–Soviet War, alleged that Budyonny killed his wife after she had confronted him over his infidelity. Budyonny told his daughter by a subsequent marriage that she shot herself, possibly unintentionally, when their marriage was failing.

In 1925, he married a singer, Olga Stefanovna Mikhailova, who was around half his age, the daughter of a railway worker from Kursk. After their marriage, she entered the Moscow Conservatory, graduating in 1930, then joined the Bolshoi Theatre. According to the Croatian communist, Ante Ciliga, members of the Communist Youth (Komsomol) were so shocked to see him with his new bride at a public banquet, kissing her hands, that they threatened to create a scandal which the party authorities "had to use a very heavy hand to stifle". Budyonny divorced her before September 1937.

Next, Budyonny married Olga's cousin, Maria Vasilevna, a student 33 years his junior, who cooked for him after Olga's arrest. This marriage lasted until his death. They had two sons, Sergei, born 1938, and Mikhail, born 1944, and a daughter, Nina, born 1939.

== Honours and awards ==
Russian Empire

Cross of St. George, all four-classes (Full Cavalier).

Soviet Union

	Hero of the Soviet Union, thrice (1 February 1958, 24 April 1963, 22 February 1968)
	Order of Lenin, eight times (23 February 1935, 17 November 1939, 24 April 1943, 21 February 1945, 24 April 1953, 1 February 1963, 22 February 1968, 24 April 1973)
	Order of the Red Banner, six times (29 March 1919, 13 March 1923, 22 February 1930, 8 January 1941, 3 November 1944, 24 June 1968)
	Order of Suvorov, 1st class (22 February 1944)
?	Order of the Red Banner of Azerbaijan SSR (29 November 1923)
?	Order of the Red Banner of Labour of Uzbek SSR (19 January 1930)
	Medal "For the Defence of Moscow" (1944)
	Medal "For the Defence of Sevastopol" (1942)
	Medal "For the Defence of Odessa" (1942)
	Medal "For the Defence of the Caucasus" (1944)
	Medal "For the Victory over Germany in the Great Patriotic War 1941–1945" (1945)
	Medal "For the Victory over Japan" (1945)
	Jubilee Medal "Twenty Years of Victory in the Great Patriotic War 1941–1945" (1965)
	Jubilee Medal "In Commemoration of the 100th Anniversary of the Birth of Vladimir Ilyich Lenin" (1969)
	Jubilee Medal "XX Years of the Workers' and Peasants' Red Army" (1938)
	Jubilee Medal "30 Years of the Soviet Army and Navy" (1948)
	Jubilee Medal "40 Years of the Armed Forces of the USSR" (1958)
	Jubilee Medal "50 Years of the Armed Forces of the USSR" (1968)
	Medal "In Commemoration of the 800th Anniversary of Moscow" (1947)
	Medal "In Commemoration of the 250th Anniversary of Leningrad" (1957)

- Honorary weapon – sword inscribed with golden national emblem of the Soviet Union (1968)
- Honorary weapon – sword inscribed with Order of the Red Banner
- Honorary weapon – Mauser C96 inscribed with Order of the Red Banner

Foreign awards

Medal of Sino-Soviet Friendship (China)
Order of Sukhbaatar, twice (Mongolia)
Order of the Red Banner, (Mongolia, 1936)
Order of Friendship (Mongolia, 1967)
Medal "50 years of the Mongolian People's Revolution" (Mongolia, 1970)
Medal "50 years of the Mongolian People's Army" (Mongolia, 1970)
Order of Polonia Restituta, 3rd class (Poland, 1973)

== See also ==
- Absinthe

== Sources ==
- Kuznetsov, Nikolay (1969). The Day Before. Military Memoirs. Moscow: Military Publishing House of the Ministry of Defense of the Soviet Union.
