= Proletariat (disambiguation) =

The Proletariat is the social class of wage-earners

Proletariat may also refer to:

== Marxism ==
- Dictatorship of the proletariat, a Marxist political term
- Lumpenproletariat, a term from Karl Marx and Friedrich Engel's work, The German Ideology

== Music ==
- The Proletariat, an American punk rock band
- Proletaryat (in Polish), a rock band from Poland

== Political parties ==
- Proletariat (party) - First Proletariat, the first Polish socialist party; its successor, the Second Proletariat; and another Polish party, the Third Proletariat.
- Communist Party of the Portuguese Workers / Reorganizative Movement of the Party of the Proletariat, a Maoist communist party in Portugal
- Revolutionary Party of the Proletariat - Bases for Revolution, a political party in Portugal
- Revolutionary Party of the Proletariat - Revolutionary Brigades, a political party in Portugal
- Party of the Dictatorship of the Proletariat, a communist party in Russia

== Other ==
- Proletariat, developer of the game Spellbreak
