= Proletarsky, Vologda Oblast =

Proletarsky Пролетарский
- Settlement
- Location within Vologda Oblast Location within Russia
- Coordinates: 60°36′N 40°10′E
- Country: Russia
- Region: Vologda Oblast
- District: Vozhegodsky District
- Time zone: UTC+3:00

Proletarsky (Russian: Пролетарский) is a rural locality (a settlement) in Yavengskoye Rural Settlement, Vozhegodsky District, Vologda Oblast, Russia. The population was 419 as of 2002. There are 11 streets.

== Geography ==
Proletarsky is located 19 km north of Vozhega (the district's administrative centre) by road. Pokrovskoye is the nearest rural locality.
