= Proletarskaya metro station =

Proletarskaya metro station may refer to:

== Belarus ==
- Proletarskaya (Minsk Metro), a station of the Minsk Metro, Minsk, Belarus

== Russia ==
- Proletarskaya (Moscow Metro), a station of the Moscow Metro, Moscow, Russia
- Proletarskaya (Saint Petersburg Metro), a station of the Saint Petersburg Metro, Saint Petersburg, Russia
- Proletarskaya (Nizhny Novgorod Metro), a station of the Nizhny Novgorod Metro, Nizhny Novgorod, Russia

== Ukraine ==
- Proletarska (Donetsk Metro) (Proletarskaya), a station of the Donetsk Metro, Donetsk, Ukraine
- Proletarska (Kharkiv Metro) (Proletarskaya), a station of the Kharkiv Metro, Kharkiv, Ukraine
