= Proletarsky, Belgorod Oblast =

Urban locality in Belgorod Oblast, Russia

Coordinates: 50°47′36″N 35°46′35″E

Proletarsky (Russian: Пролета́рский) is an urban-type settlement in Rakityansky District of Belgorod Oblast, Russia. Population: 9,040 (2021 census); 8,654 (2010 census); 8,675 (2002 census); 8,167 (1989 Soviet census).
