= Proletarsk, Rostov Oblast =

Town in Rostov Oblast, Russia

Proletarsk Пролетарск
- Town
- Interactive map of Proletarsk
- Location of Proletarsk Proletarsk (Russia)
- Coordinates: 46°42′N 41°44′E
- Country: Russia
- Federal subject: Rostov Oblast
- Administrative district: Proletarsky District
- Urban settlementSelsoviet: Proletarskoye
- Elevation: 15 m (49 ft)

Population (2010 Census)
  - Total: 20,267
  - Estimate (2021): 18,983 (−6.3%)

Administrative status
  - Capital of: Proletarsky District, Proletarskoye Urban Settlement

Municipal status
  - Municipal district: Proletarsky Municipal District
  - Urban settlement: Proletarskoye Urban Settlement
  - Capital of: Proletarsky Municipal District, Proletarskoye Urban Settlement
- Time zone: UTC+3 (MSK)
- Postal codes: 347540–347542, 347544
- OKTMO ID: 60645101001

Proletarsk (Russian: Пролета́рск) is a town and the administrative center of Proletarsky District in Rostov Oblast, Russia, located on the Manych River, on the Rostov-on-Don–Baku railway.

It was formerly the Cossack stanitsa of Velikoknyazheskaya (Великокняжеская).

== History ==
The tank farm fire was detected by NASA's FIRMS from 18 to 30 August 2024

Proletarsk is the site of a massive petroleum tank farm installation of the Russian Federal Agency for State Reserves, some 250 km from the Ukrainian border. On 18 August 2024, during the Russian invasion of Ukraine, it was set ablaze by a Ukrainian Armed Forces drone strike. As of 23 August 2024, the tank farm was still ablaze, while the Ukrainians aggravated it with another drone strike on that day. Local authorities declared a state of emergency. On 2 September the fire was extinguished. The Telegram channel RostovGazeta reported that the fire at the Proletarsk oil depot precipitated a surge in the sale of oil storage and refining facilities in the region due to the threat of new attacks from Ukraine.

== Administrative and municipal status ==
Within the framework of administrative divisions, Proletarsk serves as the administrative center of Proletarsky District. As an administrative division, it is, together with three rural localities, incorporated within Proletarsky District as Proletarskoye Urban Settlement. As a municipal division, this administrative unit also has urban settlement status and is a part of Proletarsky Municipal District.

== Demographics ==
The population of Proletarsk has slightly increased in the post-Soviet era: 20,267 (2010 census); 19,572 (2002 census); 19,422 (1989 Soviet census).
