= Proletarsky, Moscow Oblast =

Proletarsky Пролетарский
- Urban-type settlement
- Interactive map of Proletarsky
- Location of Proletarsky Proletarsky (Moscow Oblast)
- Coordinates: 55.0223°N 37.3846°E
- Country: Russia
- Federal subject: Moscow Oblast
- Administrative district: Serpukhovsky District

Population (2010 Census)
  - Total: 4,156
  - Estimate (2023): 4,287 (+3.2%)
- Time zone: UTC+3 (MSK)
- Postal code: 142271
- OKTMO ID: 46651154051

Proletarsky (Russian: Пролетарский) is an urban locality (an urban-type settlement) in Serpukhovsky District of Moscow Oblast, Russia. Population: 4,156 (2010 census); 4,103 (2002 census); 4,677 (1989 Soviet census).
