= Proletarsky District, Rostov Oblast =

Proletarsky District Пролетарский район (Russian)
- District
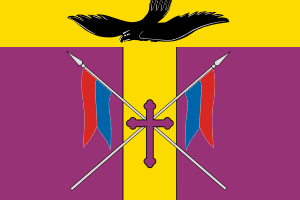
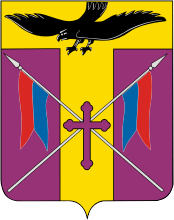
- Flag Coat of arms
- Location of Proletarsky District in Rostov Oblast
- Coordinates: 46°42′N 41°43′E
- Country: Russia
- Federal subject: Rostov Oblast
- Established: 1924
- Administrative center: Proletarsk

Area
  - Total: 2,740 km^{2} (1,060 sq mi)

Population (2010 Census)
  - Total: 36,510
  - Density: 13.3/km^{2} (34.5/sq mi)
  - Urban: 55.5%
  - Rural: 44.5%

Administrative structure
  - Administrative divisions: 1 Urban settlements, 9 Rural settlements
  - Inhabited localities: 1 cities/towns, 34 rural localities

Municipal structure
  - Municipally incorporated as: Proletarsky Municipal District
  - Municipal divisions: 1 urban settlements, 9 rural settlements
- Time zone: UTC+3 (MSK)
- OKTMO ID: 60645000
- Website: http://proletarsk.donland.ru/

Proletarsky District (Russian: Пролета́рский райо́н) is an administrative and municipal district (raion), one of the forty-three in Rostov Oblast, Russia. It is located in the south of the oblast. The area of the district is 2,740 square kilometers (1,060 sq mi). Its administrative center is the town of Proletarsk. Population: 36,510 (2010 Census); 36,297 (2002 Census); 36,346 (1989 Soviet census). The population of Proletarsk accounts for 55.5% of the district's total population.
