= Serpukhovsky District =

Serpukhovsky District Серпуховский район (Russian)
- District
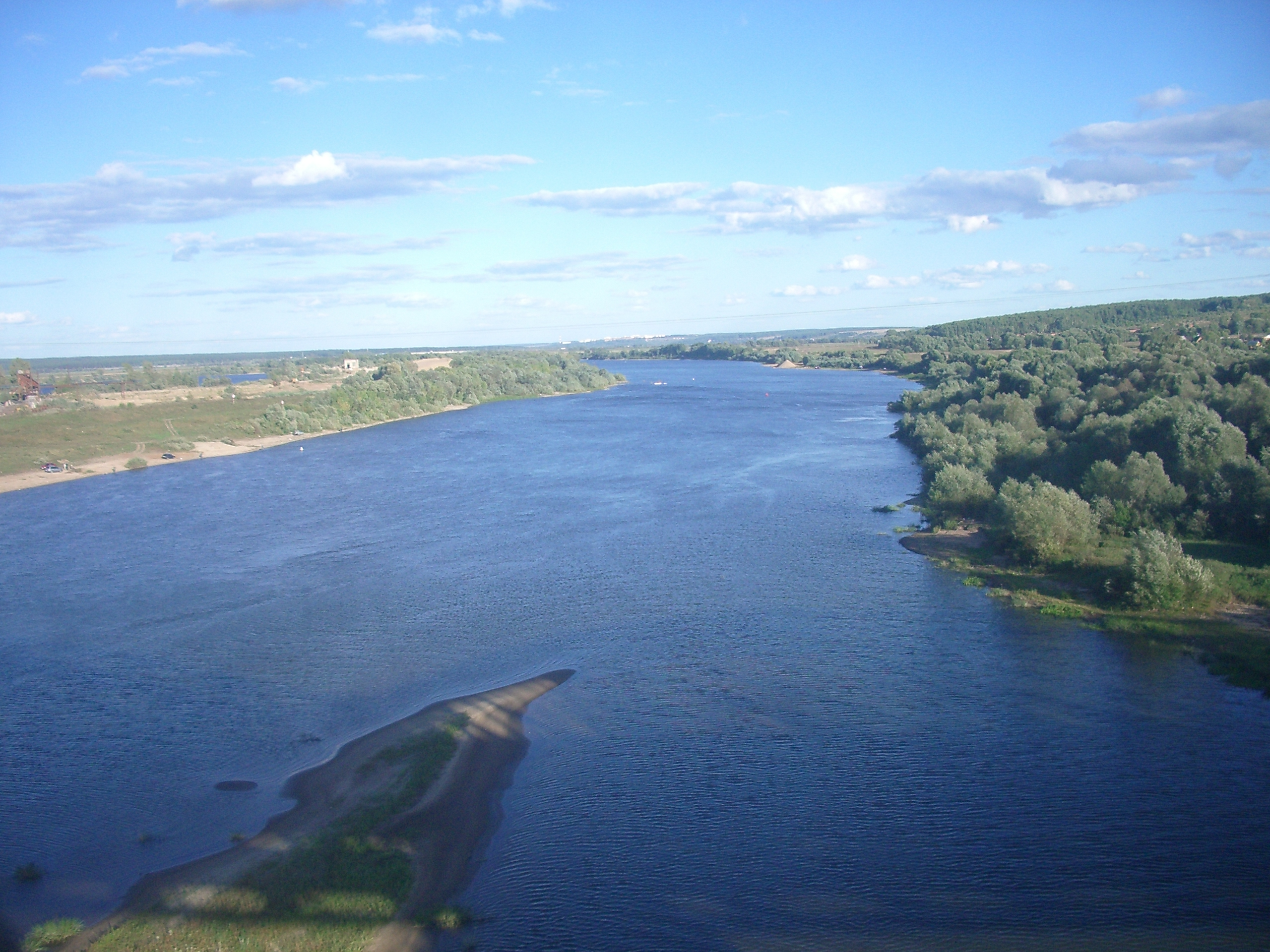
- Oka River, Serpukhovsky District

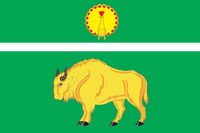
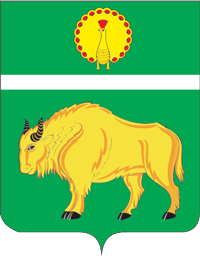
- Flag Coat of arms
- Location of Serpukhovsky District in Moscow Oblast (before July 2012)
- Coordinates: 54°55′N 37°26′E
- Country: Russia
- Federal subject: Moscow Oblast
- Established: 1929
- Administrative center: Serpukhov

Area
  - Total: 1,012.714 km^{2} (391.011 sq mi)

Population (2010 Census)
  - Total: 35,173
  - Density: 34.731/km^{2} (89.954/sq mi)
  - Urban: 25.9%
  - Rural: 74.1%

Administrative structure
  - Administrative divisions: 2 Work settlements, 5 Rural settlements
  - Inhabited localities: 2 urban-type settlements, 139 rural localities

Municipal structure
  - Municipally incorporated as: Serpukhovsky Municipal District
  - Municipal divisions: 2 urban settlements, 5 rural settlements
- Time zone: UTC+3 (MSK)
- OKTMO ID: 46651000
- Website: http://www.serpregion.ru/

Serpukhovsky District (Russian: Серпухо́вский райо́н) is an administrative and municipal district (raion), one of the thirty-six in Moscow Oblast, Russia. It is located in the south of the oblast. The area of the district is 1,012.714 square kilometers (391.011 sq mi). Its administrative center is the city of Serpukhov (which is not administratively a part of the district). Population: 35,173 (2010 Census); 34,565 (2002 census); 67,425 (1989 Soviet census).

== Administrative and municipal status ==
Within the framework of administrative divisions, Serpukhovsky District is one of the thirty-six in the oblast. The city of Serpukhov serves as its administrative center, despite being incorporated separately as a city under oblast jurisdiction—an administrative unit with the status equal to that of the districts.

As a municipal division, the district is incorporated as Serpukhovsky Municipal District. Serpukhov City Under Oblast Jurisdiction is incorporated separately from the district as Serpukhov Urban Okrug.

== Notable residents ==
- Mikhail Kuznetsov (1913–1989), WW2 Soviet flying ace, born in Agarino village
