= Sarashi, Perm Krai =

Sarashi Сараши
- Selo
- Location within Perm Krai Location within Russia
- Coordinates: 56°46′N 55°45′E
- Country: Russia
- Region: Perm Krai
- District: Bardymsky District
- Time zone: UTC+5:00

Sarashi (Russian: Сараши) is a rural locality (a selo) and the administrative center of Sarashevskoye Rural Settlement, Bardymsky District, Perm Krai, Russia. The population was 1,446 as of 2010. There are 31 streets.

== Geography ==
Sarashi is located on the Sarashka River, 38 km southeast of Barda (the district's administrative centre) by road. Krasnoyar-1 is the nearest rural locality.
