= Dubovoy (surname) =

Dubovoy is a surname mainly of Russian and or Ukrainian origin. Notable people with the surname include:

- Ivan Dubovoy (1900–1981), Soviet Army major general
- Oleksandr Dubovoy (born 1976), Ukrainian politician
- Vladislav Dubovoy (born 1989), Russian professional footballer
- Ivan Naumovich Dubovoy (1896–1938), Ukrainian Soviet army commander

== See also ==
- Dubovoy, a rural locality (a khutor) in Boldyrevskoye Rural Settlement, Ostrogozhsky District, Voronezh Oblast, Russia
