= Bichurino =

Bichurino Бичурино
- Selo
- Location within Perm Krai Location within Russia
- Coordinates: 56°50′N 55°25′E
- Country: Russia
- Region: Perm Krai
- District: Bardymsky District
- Time zone: UTC+5:00

Bichurino (Russian: Бичурино) is a rural locality (a selo) and the administrative center of Bichurinskoye Rural Settlement, Bardymsky District, Perm Krai, Russia. The population was 1,373 as of 2010. There are 32 streets.

== Geography ==
Bichurino is located 15 km southwest of Barda (the district's administrative centre) by road. Bardabashka-1 is the nearest rural locality.
