= Akbash, Perm Krai =

Akbash Акбаш
- Selo
- Location within Perm Krai Location within Russia
- Coordinates: 56°57′N 55°14′E
- Country: Russia
- Region: Perm Krai
- District: Bardymsky District
- Time zone: UTC+5:00

Akbash (Russian: Акбаш) is a rural locality (a selo) in Bardymsky District, Perm Krai, Russia. The population was 540 as of 2010. There are 10 streets.

== Geography ==
Akbash is located 35 km west of Barda (the district's administrative centre) by road. Toykino is the nearest rural locality.
