= Amirovka =

Amirovka Амировка
- Village
- Location within Perm Krai Location within Russia
- Coordinates: 56°47′N 56°00′E
- Country: Russia
- Region: Perm Krai
- District: Bardymsky District
- Time zone: UTC+5:00

Amirovka (Russian: Амировка) is a rural locality (a village) in Bardymsky District, Perm Krai, Russia. The population was 23 as of 2010. There is 1 street.

== Geography ==
Amirovka is located 39 km southeast of Barda (the district's administrative centre) by road. Karmanovka is the nearest rural locality.
