= Barda, Russia =

Barda (Russian: Барда) is the name of several rural localities in Russia:

- Barda, Irkutsk Oblast, a village in Ekhirit-Bulagatsky District of Irkutsk Oblast
- Barda, Perm Krai, a selo in Bardymsky District of Perm Krai
