= Osinsky District, Perm Krai =

Osinsky District Осинский район (Russian)
- District
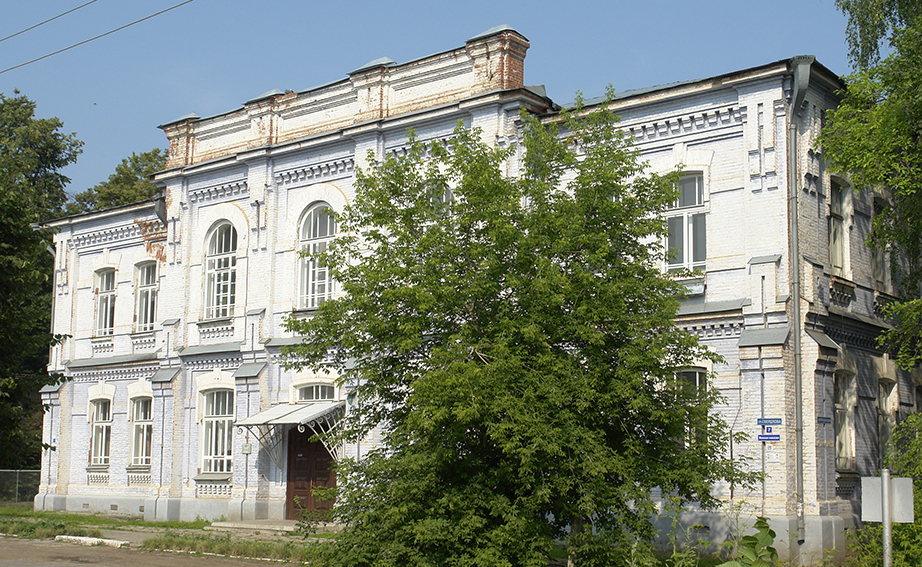
- Professional School in Osa, Built 1906

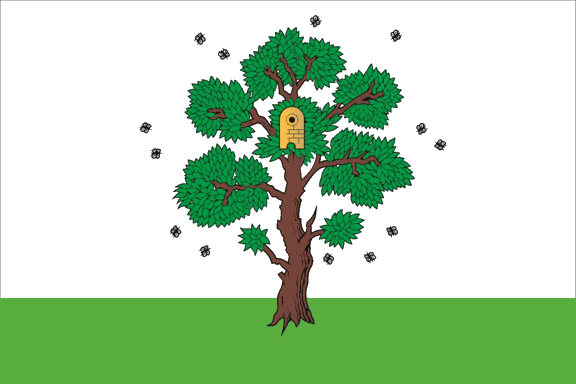
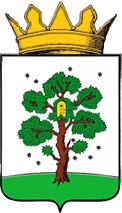
- Flag Coat of arms
- Location of Osinsky District in Perm Krai
- Coordinates: 57.260°N 55.688°E
- Country: Russia
- Federal subject: Perm Krai
- Established: January 1, 1924
- Administrative center: Osa

Area
  - Total: 2,057 km^{2} (794 sq mi)

Population (2010 Census)
  - Total: 29,513
  - Density: 14.35/km^{2} (37.16/sq mi)
  - Urban: 71.8%
  - Rural: 28.2%

Administrative structure
  - Inhabited localities: 1 cities/towns, 74 rural localities

Municipal structure
  - Municipally incorporated as: Osinsky Municipal District
  - Municipal divisions: 1 urban settlements, 8 rural settlements
- Time zone: UTC+5 (MSK+2)
- OKTMO ID: 57640000
- Website: http://www.osa-perm.ru/

Osinsky District (Russian: Оси́нский райо́н) is an administrative district (raion) of Perm Krai, Russia; one of the thirty-three in the krai. Municipally, it is incorporated as Osinsky Municipal District. It is located in the south of the krai and borders with Permsky District in the north, Kungursky District in the east, Bardymsky District in the south, Yelovsky District in the southwest, Chastinsky District in the west, and with Okhansky District in the northwest. The area of the district is 2,057 square kilometers (794 sq mi). Its administrative center is the town of Osa. Population: 29,513 (2010 census); 33,666 (2002 census); 35,267 (1989 Soviet census). The population of Osa accounts for 71.8% of the district's total population.

== Geography ==
50.2% of district's territory is covered by forests. Climate is temperate continental. Main rivers include the Kama River and its tributary the Tulva.

== History ==
The district was established on January 1, 1924. In October 1938, it became a part of Perm Oblast.

== Demographics ==
Ethnic composition as of the 2002 Census:

- Russians: 90.1%
- Bashkirs and Tatars: 6%

== Economy ==
District's economy is mostly based on agriculture, mining, and food industry.

== Sources ==
- Законодательное собрание Пермской области. Закон №416-67 от 28 февраля 1996 г. «Об административно-территориальном устройстве Пермского края», в ред. Закона №504-ПК от 9 июля 2015 г. «О внесении изменений в Закон Пермской области "Об административно-территориальном устройстве Пермского края"». Вступил в силу с момента опубликования. Опубликован: "Звезда", №38, 12 марта 1996 г. (Legislative Assembly of Perm Oblast. Law #416-67 of February 28, 1996 On the Administrative-Territorial Structure of Perm Krai, as amended by the Law #504-PK of July 9, 2015 On Amending the Law of Perm Oblast "On the Administrative-Territorial Structure of Perm Krai". Effective as of the moment of publication.).
- Законодательное собрание Пермской области. Закон №1717-348 от 10 ноября 2004 г. «Об утверждении границ и о наделении статусом муниципальных образований Осинского района Пермского края», в ред. Закона №273-ПК от 14 декабря 2013 г. «О внесении изменений в отдельные Законы Пермской области, Коми-Пермяцкого автономного округа, Пермского края». Вступил в силу через десять дней со дня официального опубликования. Опубликован: "Бюллетень Законодательного Собрания и администрации Пермской области", №12, I часть, 9 декабря 2004 г. (Legislative Assembly of Perm Oblast. Law #1717-348 of November 10, 2004 On Establishing the Borders and on Granting the Status to the Municipal Formations of Osinsky District of Perm Krai, as amended by the Law #273-PK of December 14, 2013 On Amending Various Laws of Perm Oblast, Komi-Permyak Autonomous Okrug, Perm Krai. Effective as of the day which is ten days following the day of the official publication.).
