= 6th Guards Airborne Division =

- Active: 1942–1959
- Country: Soviet Union
- Branch: Red Army (later Soviet Army)
- Type: Airborne, Infantry
- Size: 5,001 (25 March 1945)
- Engagements: World War II; Battle of Kursk; Battle of the Dnieper; Korsun–Shevchenkovsky Offensive; Uman–Botoșani Offensive; Second Jassy–Kishinev Offensive; Battle of Debrecen; Budapest Offensive; Prague Offensive
- Decorations: Order of the Red Banner; Order of Suvorov, 2nd class
- Battle honours: Kremenchug; Znamenka

The 6th Guards Airborne Division (Russian: 6-я гвардейская воздушно-десантная дивизия) was a Red Army airborne division that fought as infantry during World War II.

Formed in December 1942 from an airborne corps, it first saw combat as an infantry unit in the Staraya Russa in March 1943, then fought in the Battle of Kursk. The division fought in Operation Kutuzov and advanced west in the Battle of the Dnieper. The division then fought in the Kirovograd Offensive and the Korsun-Shevchenkovsky Offensive in late 1943 and early 1944.

The 5th Guards received the Order of the Red Banner and the Order of Suvorov for actions during the Uman–Botoșani Offensive, then fought in the Second Jassy–Kishinev Offensive. The division advanced westward into Hungary, fighting in the Battle of Debrecen and the Budapest Offensive in late 1944. In the last months of the war it fought in the Bratislava–Brno Offensive and ended the war fighting in the Prague Offensive.

Weeks after the end of the war, it was redesignated as the 113th Guards Rifle Division. It was downsized into a brigade between 1947 and 1953, serving in the Taurida Military District. The division became a motor rifle division in 1957 and disbanded in 1959.

== History ==
=== World War II ===
The 6th Guards Airborne Division was formed on 8 December 1942 from the 6th Airborne Corps in Noginsk, one of eight new airborne divisions formed due to a shortage of infantry. The former commander of the 6th Airborne Corps, Major General Alexander Kirzimov, continued in command of the new division. Although its personnel received airborne training, the division was organized as a guards rifle division and would fight as infantry for the rest of the war. It included the 14th, 17th, and 20th Guards Airborne Regiments, the 8th Guards Airborne Artillery Regiment, and smaller units. Before the division went into combat, Kirzimov was replaced by Colonel Mikhail Smirnov on 11 March 1943, who was promoted to major general on 16 October 1943; he would command the unit for the rest of the war. The division saw its first combat with the 1st Shock Army in the area of Koshelki south of Staraya Russa on 14 March during the Staraya Russa Offensive. After that, the division was placed in the Reserve of the Supreme High Command. As part of the 5th Guards Army, the division fought in the Battle of Kursk and the Belgorod-Kharkov Offensive Operation. After the Battle of the Dnieper, the division captured Kremenchuk on 29 September and Znamianka on 9 December, for which it was awarded honorifics. On 8 January 1944, the division helped capture Kirovohrad during the Kirovograd Offensive. In the Korsun-Shevchenkovsky Offensive, the division stopped German attempts to relieve the Korsun Pocket. During the Uman–Botoșani Offensive, it operated with the 4th Guards Army. For its performance during the offensive, the division was awarded the Order of the Red Banner on 19 March.

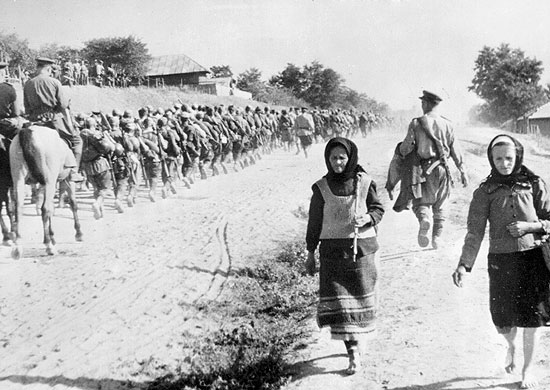
Soviet troops on the march in Moldova during the Second Jassy–Kishinev Offensive, late August 1944

For crossing the Dniester, the 6th Guards Airborne was awarded the Order of Suvorov 2nd class on 8 April. 14th Guards Airborne Regiment platoon commander Starshina Sharifzyan Kazanbaev was posthumously made a Hero of the Soviet Union for saving the regimental flag during fighting in early April. In the second half of April, it crossed the Prut and entered Romanian territory. As part of the 7th Guards Army, it fought in the Second Jassy–Kishinev Offensive and captured Târgu Frumos. In October, it fought in the Battle of Debrecen. Advancing into Hungary, it fought in the Budapest Offensive. On 5 December, the division broke through the northeastern defensive lines of Budapest as part of the 7th Guards Army, with which it remained for the rest of the war. At the end of December it crossed the Hron, but was forced to retreat in the face of German resistance.

On 25 March 1945, the division crossed the Hron in the area of Zhemlyari during the Bratislava–Brno Offensive. On that day, it had a strength of 5,001 officers and men, with slightly more than 1,000 in each of its three rifle regiments. The division was equipped with 2,157 rifles, 851 submachine guns, 109 light machine guns, 49 heavy machine guns, twelve anti-aircraft machine guns, twelve 120 mm mortars equally divided between each rifle regiment, 51 82 mm mortars equally divided between the rifle regiments, five 122 mm howitzers, twenty 76 mm divisional guns, eight 76 mm regimental guns, eighteen 45 mm anti-tank guns, 36 anti-tank rifles, and 131 vehicles. After the breaking through the German lines, the division captured Šurany, advanced over the Western Carpathians, and captured oilfields in Zistersdorf. The division fought in the Prague Offensive at the end of the war and captured Příbram on 11 May.

=== Postwar ===
On 13 June 1945, it was redesignated as the 113th Guards Rifle Division to reflect its infantry role as part of the 25th Guards Rifle Corps of the 7th Guards Army in the newly created Central Group of Forces. Its airborne regiments became the 359th, 361st, and 363rd Guards Rifle Regiments, and the division also included the 468th and 473rd Guards Artillery Regiments. The division was withdrawn to Zaporizhia in the Odessa Military District in late 1945 with the corps and downsized into the 43rd Separate Guards Rifle Brigade in April 1948 following the disbandment of the corps in May 1947. The brigade was subsequently moved to Yevpatoria in the Taurida Military District, where it became a division again in October 1953. By 1955, the 85th Guards Tank Regiment was added to the division. On 17 May 1957, the 113th Guards Rifle Division became a motor rifle division at Yevpatoria with the 45th Army Corps. It included the 359th, 361st and 363rd Guards Motor Rifle Regiments formed from guards rifle regiments with the same numbers, the 85th Guards Tank Regiment and other smaller units. The division was disbanded on 1 March 1959.

== Commanders ==
The following officers are known to have led the division:

- Major General Alexander Kirzimov (8 December 1942 – 10 March 1943)
- Colonel Mikhail Smirnov (11 March 1943–December 1948; promoted to major general on 16 October 1943)
