= Boris Skvortsov =

Red army major general (1902–1946)

Boris Mikhailovich Skvortsov
- Skvortsov, c. 1940
- Born: 10 July 1902; Samara, Russian Empire
- Died: 12 May 1946 (aged 43)
- Allegiance: Russian SFSR; Soviet Union
- Branch: Red Army
- Service years: 1919–1946
- Rank: Major general of Tank Forces
- Commands: 11th Light Tank Brigade; 61st Tank Division; 5th Guards Mechanized Corps
- Conflicts: Russian Civil War; Battles of Khalkhin Gol; World War II
- Awards: Order of Lenin (2); Order of the Red Banner (2)

Boris Mikhailovich Skvortsov (Russian: Борис Михайлович Скворцов; 10 July 1902 – 12 May 1946) was a Red Army major general of tank forces who rose to command the 5th Guards Mechanized Corps during World War II.

== Early life and Russian Civil War ==
Boris Mikhailovich Skvortsov was born on 10 July 1902 in Samara. During the Russian Civil War, he joined a partisan detachment of the Ufa Governorate Communist Party in August 1919. With the partisan detachment and then the 2nd Consolidated Division of V. M. Azin, he fought against the forces of Alexander Kolchak in the region of Ufa, Agryz, and Izhevsk, Skvortsov became a cadet at the 2nd Volsk Machine Gun Course in May 1920, and after his graduation in November became a platoon and company commander in elements of the 3rd Reserve Brigade of the Southern Front at Rostov-on-Don, then from April 1921 in the 329th Rifle Regiment of the Separate Terek Brigade at Pyatigorsk. From August 1921 he served as assistant chief of the railroad militsiya at the Samara station, and from October of that year, was a worker of the transport Cheka at Omsk.

== Interwar period ==
Transferred to the Soviet Far East in March 1922, Skvortsov served with the People's Revolutionary Army of the Far Eastern Republic as chief of the machine gun detachment of the 2nd Border Battalion. He served with the 3rd Verkhneudinsk Regiment of the 1st Pacific Rifle Division from August of that year, and late that year fought with his unit in the campaign to occupy Primorye and Vladivostok. Subsequently, he served with the regiment as a platoon commander, chief of the machine gun detachment, and machine gun company commander. During this period, Skvortsov completed the six-month commanders refresher course of the 5th Army at Chita in 1924 and the Vystrel course in 1929. During the Sino-Soviet conflict of 1929, the regiment was deployed to the Chinese border. Skvortsov served as assistant chief and acting chief of staff of the 61st Osa Rifle Regiment of the 21st Perm Rifle Division of the Siberian Military District at Tomsk from November 1930.

In May 1932, he was sent to study at the Moscow Improvement Course of the Motorized and Mechanized Forces of the Red Army at the Military Academy of Mechanization and Motorization, and after his graduation later that year served there as a tactics instructor. In 1933 he graduated from the Red Army Officers Improvement Course at Moscow before being transferred to the Kazan Improvement Course for Senior and Midlevel Command and Technical Personnel in January 1934. At the latter, he served as a tactics instructor, chief of a course, and company commander. During this period Skvortsov graduated from the Military Academy of Mechanization and Motorization in 1936.

From May 1937, Skvortsov commanded the separate tank battalion of the 7th Armored Motor Brigade of the 57th Special Corps, and in August 1938 was appointed assistant commander of the brigade for the technical section. In November 1938 he was transferred to the 11th Light Tank Brigade to serve as its assistant commander for personnel. With the brigade, he fought in the Battles of Khalkhin Gol and for his "courage and heroism" in battle was awarded the Order of Lenin on 17 November 1939 and the Order of the Red Banner of the Mongolian People's Republic on 21 September 1939. From October 1939 he served as inspector of the motorized and armored forces of the 1st Army Group, which was used to form the 17th Army. Appointed commander of the 11th Light Tank Brigade of the Transbaikal Military District on 10 August 1940, Skvortsov took command of the 61st Tank Division of the 29th Mechanized Corps in March 1941.

== World War II ==
After Operation Barbarossa began, then-Colonel Skvortsov remained in command of the division. He became the deputy commander of the 17th Army for armored forces in June 1942. During this period, the army covered the Soviet border with China and Mongolia in the Transbaikal. Promoted to major general of tank forces on 7 February 1943, Skvortsov became commander of the 5th Guards Mechanized Corps on 2 March of that year. With the 5th Guards Tank Army, the corps distinguished itself in the Battle of Kursk. As part of a combined detachment, it played a main role in the destruction of the German III Panzer Corps in the region of Rzhavets, north of Belgorod. During the Belgorod–Kharkov offensive operation, the corps advanced up to 120 km, fighting as part of the mobile group of the Voronezh Front, ensuring the capture of Kharkov by the main forces of the army. From October to December, the corps fought in heavy fighting to expand the bridgehead on the Dnieper southeast of Kremenchug. Subsequently, the corps fought in the Kirovograd offensive, the Korsun-Shevchenkovsky Offensive, and the Uman–Botoșani offensive. During these actions, the corps advanced more than 500 km in fighting, assault-crossing the Southern Bug, Dniester, and Prut, and ensured the capture of Kirovograd, Uman, and others.

From early June 1944 to March 1945, the corps was in the Reserve of the Supreme High Command, then from April 1945 part of the 4th Guards Tank Army of the 1st Ukrainian Front. During the offensive of the corps, it broke through German defenses in the Jüterbog region, ensuring the entry of the main forces of the army. Continuing the offensive towards Treuenbrietzen, it liberated a concentration camp and a large number of prisoners of war. From mid-April, Skvortsov was at the disposal of the Commander-in-Chief of the Armored and Mechanized Forces of the Red Army.

== Postwar ==
After the end of the war, Skvortsov was hospitalized for treatment of illness, which he died of on 12 May 1946.

== Awards ==
Skvortsov was a recipient of the following awards and decorations:

- Order of Lenin (2)
- Order of the Red Banner (2)
- Order of Suvorov, 2nd class
- Medals
- Foreign orders
