= General Smirnov =

General Smirnov may refer to:

- Ilya Smirnov (1887–1964), Soviet Red Army lieutenant general
- Konstantin Smirnov (1854–1930), Imperial Russian Army lieutenant general
- Mikhail Nikolayevich Smirnov (general) (1900–1967), Soviet Army major general
- Sergei Mikhailovich Smirnov (born 1950), Russian Army general
- Yuriy Smirnov (minister) (born 1948), Militsiya of Ukraine colonel general
