= Ivan Dubovoy =

Soviet Army major general (1900–1981)

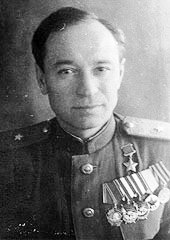
- Dubovoy in c. 1945
- Native name: Иван Васильевич Дубовой
- Born: 16 June [O.S. 3 June] 1900; Starobelsk, Kharkov Governorate, Russian Empire
- Died: 17 April 1981 (aged 80) Kaliningrad, Moscow Oblast, Soviet Union
- Buried: Vagankovo Cemetery
- Allegiance: Russian SFSR; Soviet Union
- Branch: Red Army (Soviet Army from 1946)
- Service years: 1919–1955
- Rank: Major general of tank forces
- Commands: 7th Mechanized Corps; 16th Tank Corps
- Conflicts: Russian Civil War; Polish–Soviet War; World War II
- Awards: Hero of the Soviet Union

Ivan Vasilievich Dubovoy (Russian: Иван Васильевич Дубовой; 16 June [O.S. 3 June] 1900 – 17 April 1981) was a Soviet Army major general of tank forces and a Hero of the Soviet Union.

Dubovoy served in the Russian Civil War and the Polish–Soviet War with an artillery unit. He became a junior officer in artillery units during the interwar period and in the early 1930s transferred to the emerging mechanized forces, where he rose to chief of staff of a tank brigade, tank division, and mechanized corps. After the beginning of Operation Barbarossa his unit was destroyed in encirclement in Belarus, with Dubovoy reaching Soviet lines after two months behind German lines. He subsequently served as chief of staff of the 1st Mechanized Corps and became commander of the 7th Mechanized Corps before being severely wounded in late 1943. After recovering, Dubovoy became commander of the 16th Tank Corps, being made a Hero of the Soviet Union for his leadership of it in the Uman–Botoșani Offensive of early 1944. Dubovoy was replaced in command of the corps in August 1944 and never held active command again. He continued to serve postwar and retired in the 1950s.

== Early life and Russian Civil War ==
Dubovoy was born to a Ukrainian working-class family on 16 June 1900 in Starobelsk, Kharkov Governorate. He graduated from a parish and vocational schools, working as a mechanic's assistant at a mill. After the October Revolution, he was elected secretary of the local Komsomol district committee in 1918. After joining the Red Army in July 1919 he was sent to the 12th Separate Artillery Battalion, with which he fought on the Southern and Western Fronts as a Red Army man, being contused in fighting on the former. In September 1920, after the defeat of the Red Army in the Battle of Warsaw, Dubovoy was interned in East Prussia with the 2nd Battery of the 12th Separate Heavy Field Artillery Battalion, returning to Soviet Russia a month later.

== Interwar period ==
From November 1920 Dubovoy served as a Red Army man with the reserve regiment of the 16th Army, then became a clerk at the Starobelsk Military Commissariat. He graduated from the 7th Artillery Courses in Sevastopol in 1921, the 5th Kharkov Artillery School in 1923, and the Odessa Artillery School in 1925. After graduating from the latter, he served with the 19th Separate Artillery Battery as chief of reconnaissance and a platoon commander. From October 1927 he was a platoon commander with the 34th Separate Artillery Battalion in Baku.

After graduating from the Improvement Courses for Anti-Aircraft Artillery Command Personnel in Sevastopol in 1928 Dubovoy became a course commander at the Sevastopol Artillery School. He was sent to study at the Dzherzhinsky Military-Technical Academy in June 1930, but was transferred to the Military Academy of Mechanization and Motorization in May 1932. After graduating from the latter, he was sent to the Soviet Far East and from June 1935 served as chief of staff of a tank battalion and battalion reconnaissance commander with the 23rd Mechanized Brigade. From October 1937, he served as assistant chief of the 1st department of the Tank Directorate of the staff of the Special Red Banner Far Eastern Army. In March 1938 he became assistant chief of staff of the 8th Separate Mechanized Brigade of the Belorussian Military District. From August 1939 Dubovoy served as chief of staff of the 29th Tank Brigade, with which he fought in the Winter War, and in November 1940 transferred to serve in the same position for the 7th Tank Division of the 6th Mechanized Corps of the Western Special Military District (the former Belorussian Military District). In March 1941 he was appointed chief of staff of the new 20th Mechanized Corps.

== World War II ==
After the beginning of Operation Barbarossa, the corps fought in the Battle of Białystok–Minsk and the Siege of Mogilev as part of the 4th and then the 13th Armies of the Western Front. The corps was encircled from 16 July and destroyed in the fighting. Dubovoy escaped from the pocket surrounding Mogilev and reached Soviet lines at the village of Stolby in early September. He was appointed chief of staff of the 25th Tank Brigade, forming at Novoye Sormovo, on 29 September, which was sent to the Western Front as part of the 5th Army in the second half of October. The brigade was subsequently relocated to Istra, and Dubovoy took command of it on 31 October, during the Battle of Moscow, in which the 25th fought in the Solnechnogorsk area. The brigade was withdrawn to the Reserve of the Supreme High Command on 18 December and in February 1942 he was appointed deputy commander-in-chief for tank forces of the 47th Army of the Crimean Front, and in late May became chief of staff of the 27th Tank Corps (converted into the 1st Mechanized Corps in September), fighting on the Kalinin and Steppe Fronts. With the corps, he fought in Operation Mars in the vicinity of Rzhev during December 1942, in which it was surrounded and broke out of encirclement. The corps fought in the Battle of Kursk and the Belgorod–Kharkov Offensive in mid-1943. After being promoted to major general of tank forces on 16 July, Dubovoy was appointed commander of the 7th Mechanized Corps of the 5th Guards Tank Army in August 1943.

Dubovoy distinguished himself in during the capture of the city of Pyatikhatka on 19 October 1943 during the Battle of the Dnieper but was severely wounded a few days later near Krivoy Rog. After recovering, he was appointed commander of the 16th Tank Corps of the 2nd Tank Army of the 1st Ukrainian Front on 4 December. For his "courage and heroism" during the attack of his corps upon the Axis flank and rear on the outskirts of Uman during the Uman–Botoșani Offensive in spring 1944, Dubovoy was made a Hero of the Soviet Union and awarded the Order of Lenin on 11 March. He led the corps as part of the 1st Belorussian Front in Operation Bagration, during which it advanced into eastern Poland. In August, Dubovoy was recalled from the front and appointed head of the Higher Officers' School of Self-Propelled Artillery of the Red Army Armored and Mechanized Forces.

== Postwar ==
After the end of the war, Dubovoy continued to serve in the army and became deputy commander of the 18th Guards Mechanized Division in December 1946. From December 1947 he was chief of staff for the Commander-in-Chief of Armored and Mechanized Forces of the Transbaikal Military District. In June 1949, he became a senior lecturer at the Military Academy of Armored and Mechanized Forces, and then chief of the command faculty of distance learning at the academy. Transferred to the reserve in August 1955, Dubovoy lived in Kaliningrad, Moscow Oblast, where he died on 17 April 1981. He was buried in Vagankovo Cemetery.

== Awards ==
Dubovoy was a recipient of the following decorations:

- Hero of the Soviet Union
- Order of Lenin (2)
- Order of the Red Banner (3)
- Foreign decorations
