= Sharifzyan Kazanbaev =

Tatar Red Army sergeant major of Soviet Union

Sharifzyan Gabdurahmanovich Kazanbaev
- Шарифзян Габдурахманович Казанбаев
- Born: 1916; Sarashi, Osinsky Uyezd, Perm Governorate, Russian Empire
- Died: 1 April 1944 (aged 27–28); Orhei District, Moldavian SSR, Soviet Union
- Military career
- Allegiance: Soviet Union
- Branch: Red Army
- Service years: 1938–1944
- Rank: Starshina/Sergeant major
- Unit: 6th Guards Airborne Division
- Conflicts: World War II; Uman-Botosani Offensive (DOW)
- Awards: Hero of the Soviet Union

Sharifzyan Gabdurahmanovich Kazanbaev (Russian: Шарифзян Габдурахманович Казанбаев; 1916 – 1 April 1944) was a Tatar Red Army sergeant major or Starshina and posthumous Hero of the Soviet Union. Kazanbaev was awarded the title posthumously for his actions in the Uman–Botoșani Offensive. Kazanbaev was mortally wounded saving his regiment's colour.

== Early life ==
Kazanbaev was born in 1916 in the village of Sarashi in Perm Governorate to a peasant family. After graduating from seventh grade and road masters courses in Sverdlovsk, he returned to Sarashi. He became the chairman of the village general store. In 1938, Kazanbaev was drafted into the Red Army.

== World War II ==
Kazanbaev fought in combat from 1941 and served with the 6th Guards Airborne Division from its formation. In the spring of 1944, he was a squad leader in the Commandant's Platoon of the division's 14th Guards Airborne Regiment. Kazanbaev fought in the Uman-Botosani Offensive. On 31 March the regiment conducted a raid in the German rear, capturing Ciocîlteni village and blocking the road. The regiment held the highway and repulsed counterattacks by superior numbers of German troops. When the situation worsened and the German troops broke through to the outskirts of the village, the regiment's chief of staff ordered Kazanbaev and his squad to save the regimental colour. He led his squad to link up with advancing Soviet troops. They were attacked by German troops and a seriously wounded Kazanbaev was the only survivor. He buried the flag in the ground. When rescued by a cavalry patrol, Kazanbaev was able to tell an officer where the flag was. He died from his wounds shortly afterwards on 1 April. Kazanbaev was buried in Ciocîlteni.

On 13 September 1944, Kazanbaev was posthumously awarded the title Hero of the Soviet Union and the Order of Lenin.

== Legacy ==
A street and a school in Sarashi are named for Kazanbaev. An obelisk dedicated to him was also erected in the village.
