= 7th Mechanized Corps =

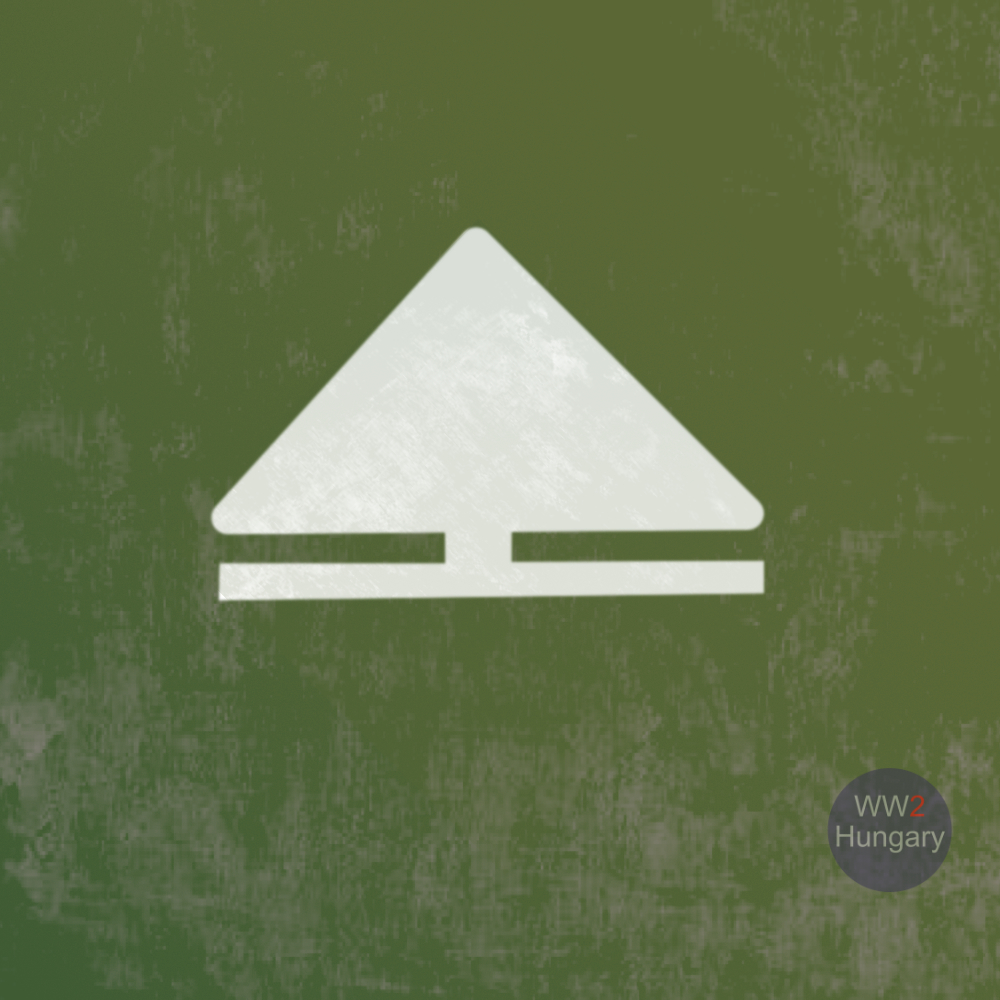
- Emblem of the 7th Mechanized Corps 1944–1945
- Active: 1st Formation: 1934–1938; 2nd Formation: 1940–1941; 3rd Formation: 1943–1945
- Country: Soviet Union
- Branch: Red Army
- Type: Mechanized corps
- Engagements: World War II; Battle of Smolensk; Dnieper-Carpathian Offensive; Uman–Botosani Offensive; Second Jassy–Kishinev Offensive; Bulgarian Operation; Battle of Debrecen; Budapest Offensive; Bratislava-Brno Offensive; Prague Offensive; Invasion of Manchuria
- Decorations: Order of Lenin (3rd formation); Order of the Red Banner (3rd formation); Order of Suvorov (3rd formation)
- Battle honours: Novoukrainka (3rd formation); Khingan (3rd formation)

Commanders
- Notable commanders: Vasily Vinogradov; Ivan Dubovoy; Fyodor Katkov

The 7th Mechanized Corps was a mechanized corps of the Red Army, formed three times. The corps was first formed in 1934 in the Leningrad Military District and was converted into the 10th Tank Corps in 1938. The corps was reformed in the summer of 1940 in the Moscow Military District and fought in the Battle of Smolensk, after which its headquarters became part of Group Yartsevo's headquarters. The corps was formed a third time in August and September 1943. The third formation fought in the Dnieper–Carpathian Offensive, Uman–Botoșani Offensive, Second Jassy–Kishinev Offensive, Battle of Debrecen, Budapest Offensive, Bratislava–Brno Offensive, Prague Offensive, and the Soviet invasion of Manchuria. Postwar, the corps' third formation became a division and was disbanded in 1957.

== History ==
=== First Formation ===
The corps (Military Unit Number 4862) was formed in June 1934 as part of the Leningrad Military District, under the command of Komdiv Mikhail Bakshi. The corps consisted of the 31st Mechanized Brigade and the 33rd Rifle and Machine Gun Brigade, left behind after the transfer of the 11th Mechanized Corps to the Transbaikal Military District, and the new 19th Mechanized Brigade. On 1 January 1936 the corps was equipped with a total of 563 tanks, including 40 BT-2s, 186 BT-5s, 64 BT-7s, 169 T-26 tanks and variants, 68 T-37 amphibious tanks, 33 T-27 tankettes, and three T-18 tanks. Komdiv Mikhail Bukshtynovich led the corps from August 1935 or the end of 1936 until his arrest in 1938. Komdiv Prokofy Romanenko took command of the corps in January 1938, by 1938, the corps headquarters was at Luga. In May 1938 the corps became the 10th Tank Corps and its mechanized brigades became tank brigades.

=== Second Formation ===
The corps (Military Unit Number 6850) began forming on 8 July 1940 in the Moscow Military District from the 39th and 55th Light Tank Brigades, and the 1st Motorized Division. The corps headquarters was formed from that of the 57th Rifle Corps. The 14th Tank Division was formed from the 55th Light Tank Brigade and the 18th Tank Division from the 39th Light Tank Brigade. The final prewar locations of the units were: Corps headquarters at Moscow, 14th Tank Division at Naro-Fominsk (Summer camp at Kubinka), 18th Tank Division at Kaluga, the 1st Motorized Division at Moscow (Summer camp at Alabino). The corps was commanded by Major General Vasily Vinogradov.

On 22 June, the German invasion of the Soviet Union, Operation Barbarossa, began. At the time, the corps had a strength of 959 tanks. The corps was put on alert for movement to the front and on 24 June was ordered to join the Reserve of the Supreme High Command in the Gzhatsk District. The corps headquarters, the tanks, and the 12th Tank and 13th Artillery Regiments of the 1st Motorized Division were transported by rail. The remainder of the corps moved by road, led by the remainder of the 1st Motorized Division. While passing through Gzhatsk, the corps received new orders to concentrate at Vyazma. While moving to Vyazma, the corps received new order, directing it to move to Yartsevo and then Smolensk. The final destination of the corps was to be Orsha. On the night of 26 June corps headquarters arrived at Smolensk, but could go no further due to congestion. The 1st Motorized Division took positions west of Orsha. The corps became part of the 20th Army, and without the 1st Motorized Division (which operated separately for the rest of the battle), was ordered to counterattack in conjunction with the 5th Mechanized Corps and advance to Beshankovichy, Lepel, and Senno. On 6 July, the corps had 571 tanks, including 34 KV tanks (from the Kirov plant) and 29 T-34 tanks (from the Kharkov Tank School). Most of its tanks were older types, such as 269 T-26 tanks and 196 BT tanks.

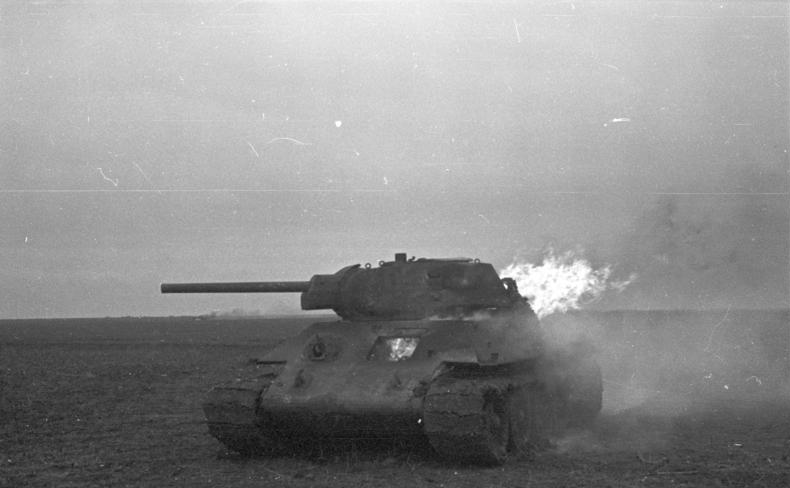
Burning T-34 tank of the type used by the corps

By the time it went into battle, the strength of the corps had been reduced to 428 tanks due to breakdowns. The corps attacked without air support, and with a shortage of fuel, ammunition, and anti-aircraft guns. The 5th Mechanized Corps stopped its advance due to fuel shortages. When the corps reached its starting positions for the counterattack, Vinogradov sent the 14th and 18th Tank Divisions forward without a reserve. The corps advanced 48 to 58 kilometers on 6 July and advanced to the area north and south of Senno, where it ran into the lines of the 7th Panzer Division. The 14th Tank Division lost half of its tanks in an attack on 7 July. The 18th Tank Division was defeated by the 20th Panzer Division and the 20th Motorized Division. After a failed attack on the 17th Panzer Division, the 14th Tank Division began a retreat. Digging in along the Vitebsk-Smolensk road, the 14th Tank Division repulsed attacks by the 12th Panzer Division. The corps withdrew east across the Dnieper to the Orsha region, where it received replacement tanks and new attack orders for 11 July.

The corps was subordinated to the 19th Army. The attack in support of 19th Army south of Vitebsk resulted in the loss of a combined 100 tanks from both the 5th and 7th Mechanized Corps. By 14 July, the 14th Tank Division had been encircled and destroyed around Liozno. The corps was encircled in the pocket between Smolensk and Orsha by 15 July. Corps headquarters and two tank battalions broke out and joined Rokossovsky's group. On 21 July, the corps was ordered withdrawn to the Sukhinichi area as part of the 4th Army and reformed as a tank division. Instead, the corps became part of Rokossovsky's Group Yartsevo, and participated in a counterattack toward Dukhovshchina on 28 July. During the counterattack, the corps captured Svishchevo, south of Yartsevo. The corps headquarters became part of the Group Yartsevo headquarters.

=== Third Formation ===
The corps was reformed between 1 August and 30 September 1943 near Solnechnogorsk in the Moscow Military District. The corps was led by Major General Ivan Dubovoy. The corps included the 16th, 63rd, and 64th Mechanized Brigades, and the 41st Guards Tank Brigade. On 15 September, the corps was given its battle flag. The self-propelled gun units of the corps were equipped with the SU-76i. On 1 October, the corps became part of the Steppe Front (later the 2nd Ukrainian Front). On 4 October, the corps was loaded onto trains and ten days later arrived at Kharkov. The corps crossed the Dnieper and on 16 October began an attack in the Piatykhatky area, which it helped capture on 19 October. On 6 November, Dubovoy was wounded and replaced by Major General Fyodor Katkov. From 24 December, the corps fought in the Dnieper–Carpathian Offensive and the Kirovograd Offensive. The corps formed part of the northern shock group during the attack on Kirovograd with the 5th Guards Army. On 5 January the 7th Mechanized Corps and 5th Guards Army broke through the German defenses north of the city. Joined by the 8th Mechanized Corps, the northern shock ground encircled Kirovograd, linking up with the 5th Guards Tank Army. The corps helped capture Kirovograd on 8 January, for which it was thanked by Stavka for its actions. On 15 January the corps was awarded the Order of the Red Banner for its actions.

During March and April 1944, the corps fought in the Uman–Botoșani Offensive. On 17 March it helped capture Novoukrainka. On 18 March the corps received the honorific "Novoukrainka" for helping to capture Novoukrainka and Pomichna. The corps fought in the capture of the northern part of Odessa Oblast and advanced to the Dniester. The corps fought in the capture of Pevomaiske on 22 March, for which it received thanks from Stavka. In August, the corps fought in the Second Jassy–Kishinev Offensive. The corps supported the main attack of the 3rd Ukrainian Front on the west bank of the Dniester.

During the offensive it crossed the Prut. On 22 August it was thanked by Stavka for breaking through heavily fortified defenses south of Bender and capturing Căușeni, Cimișlia, and Tarutino. In early September, the corps fought in the capture of Romania and Bulgaria. On 9 September the corps received the Order of Suvorov 2nd class for breaking through defenses south of Bender and helping to capture Chișinău. On the same day the corps was thanked by Stavka for occupying Shumen. From 6 to 28 October, the corps fought in the Battle of Debrecen. The corps became part of the 2nd Ukrainian Front for the operation. On 12 October, it captured Oradea, for which it received thanks from Stavka. On 20 October it helped capture Debrecen, for which it received thanks from Stavka.

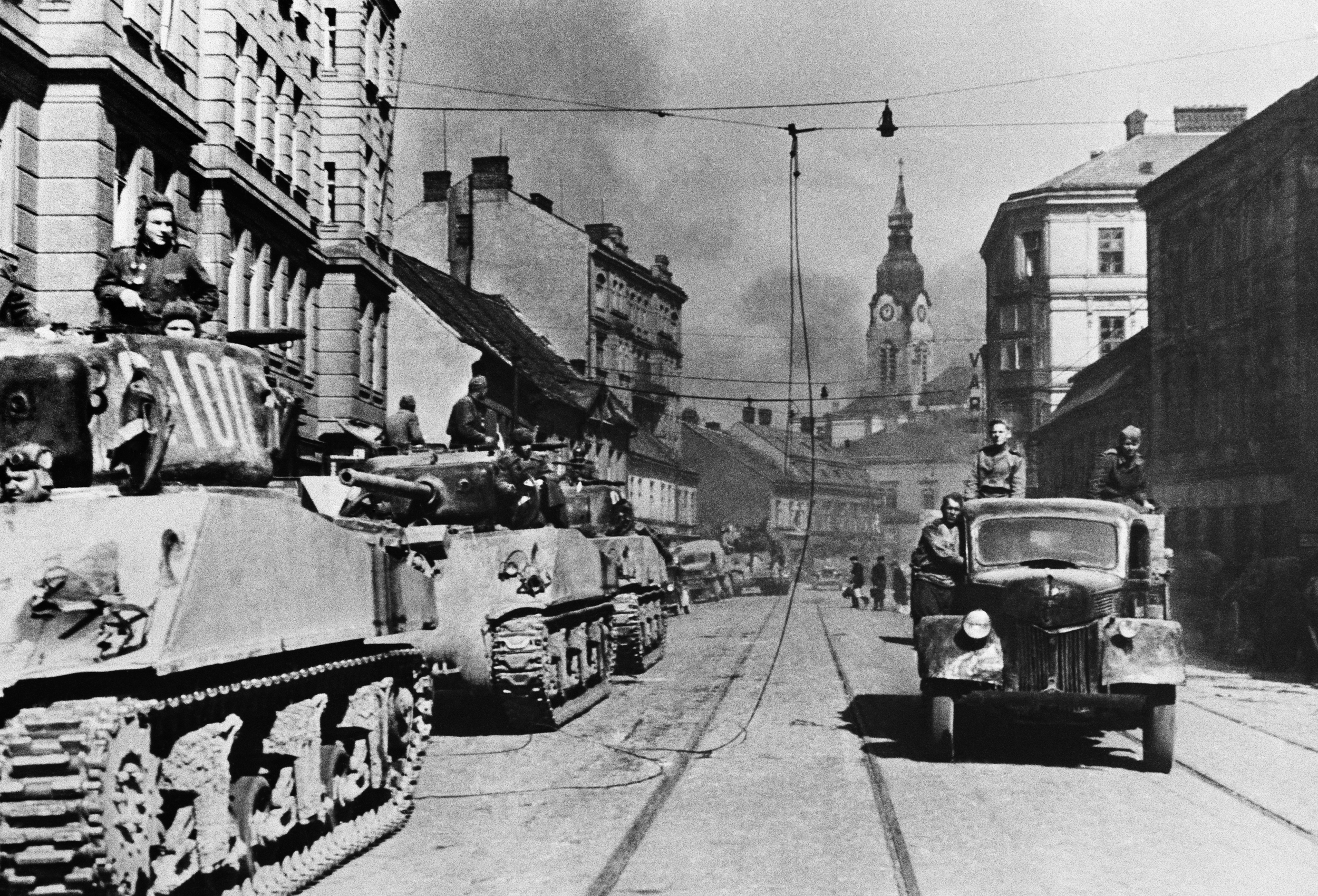
Soviet tanks in Brno

From 29 October, the corps fought in the Budapest Offensive. The corps attacked Székesfehérvár on 22 December alongside the 20th and 31st Guards Rifle Corps. At the time the corps had a strength of 107 tanks and assault guns. On 23 December it helped capture Székesfehérvár. In January, the corps received T-34/85 tanks from the 1st Guards Mechanized Corps. The German relief attempt at Budapest in late January, Operation Konrad III, surprised the corps. Its counterattack was defeated by tanks of the 5th SS Panzer Division Wiking. On 13 February the corps was thanked by Stavka for its actions in the offensive. In March and April the corps was part of the Reserve of the Supreme High Command. In late April the corps returned to the front during the Bratislava–Brno Offensive with the 1st Guards Cavalry-Mechanized Group. On 26 April it helped capture Brno and received thanks from Stavka for its actions. In the last weeks of the war in Europe, the corps fought in the Prague Offensive. On 28 May the corps was awarded the Order of Lenin for its actions in the capture of Brno.

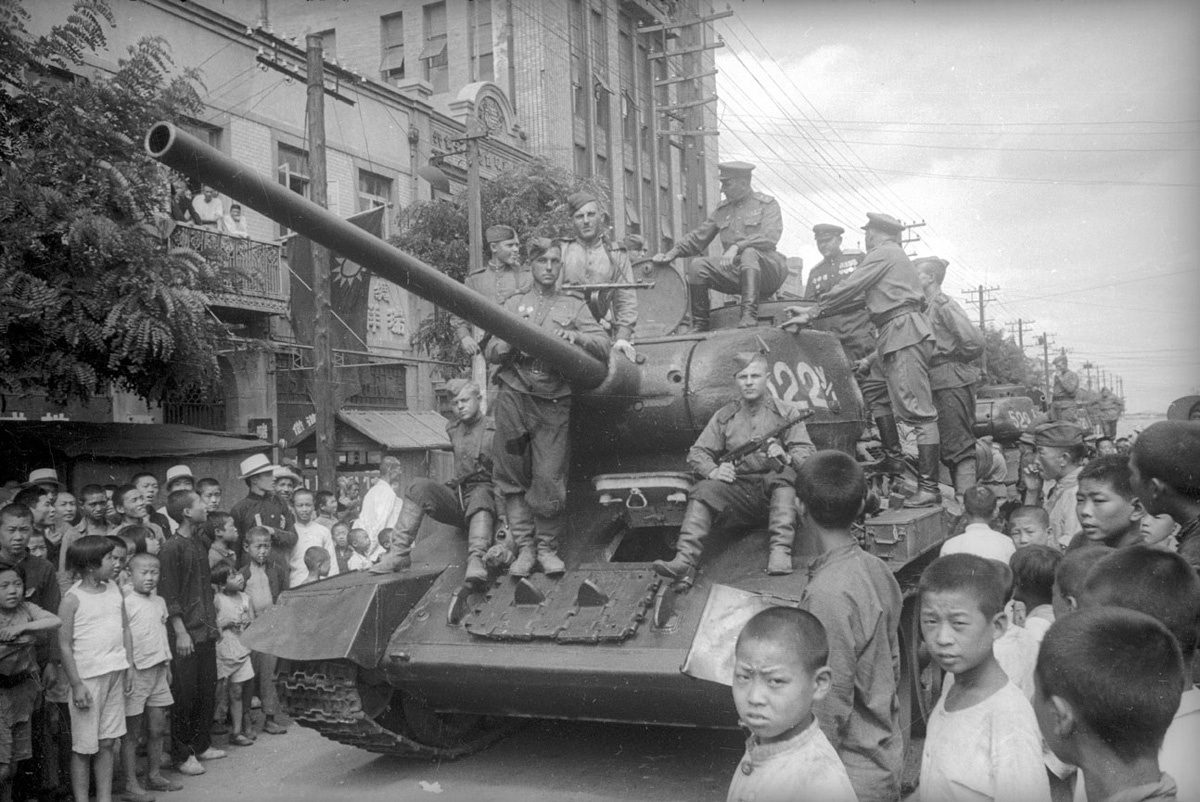
Tanks of the 7th Mechanized Corps entering Port Arthur

Between 9 and 23 July 1945, the corps was relocated to Mongolia with the 6th Guards Tank Army. The 9,000 kilometer journey to the Choibalsan area lasted 23 days. The corps deployed forward with the army in the Tamsagbulag area. At this time the corps had 285 tanks. In August, the corps fought in the Soviet invasion of Manchuria and its Khingan–Mukden Offensive Operation. The corps was to cross the Greater Khingan mountains and attack Changchun. Along with the 9th Guards Mechanized Corps, the 7th Mechanized Corps formed the first echelon of the 6th Guards Tank Army. The 36th Motor Rifle Division was attached to the corps. After its capture of Tuchuan, the corps had an extreme shortage of fuel due to its rapid advance. On 14 August the corps' advance detachment defeated a Manchukuo infantry division and captured 1,320 Japanese soldiers, capturing Taonan. On 23 August the corps received the honorific "Khingan" for its actions. On 2 September the corps ended the war in Port Arthur. The corps became the 7th Mechanized Division in late 1945 with the 39th Army. Its brigades were converted into regiments. It was stationed at Port Arthur until 1955, when it withdrew to Voroshilov. The division was disbanded on 12 April 1957.
