= 12th Guards Tank Division =

Tank division of the Soviet military

- Active: 1946–1991
- Country: Soviet Union
- Branch: Soviet Ground Forces
- Part of: 3rd Red Banner Army

The 12th Guards Uman Orders of Lenin Red Banner and Suvorov Tank Division was a tank division of the Soviet Ground Forces. It drew its history from the World War II 16th Tank Corps. It was redesignated successively as 12th Guards Tank Corps (1943) and 12th Guards Tank Division (1946).

== History ==
The division was initially formed as 17th Tank Corps in the Kiev Military District. It became part of the 2nd Tank Army upon the army's formation. During the war, it participated in fighting at Kharkov, Stalingrad, Kursk, GreI, Uman-Botoshany Offensive, Targul-Frumos, Lublin-Brest Offensive, Vistula-Oder and other operations and actions. From December 1943 to August 1944 it was commanded by Major General Ivan Vasilievich Dubovoy.

It took part in the counter-attacks against the Germans advancing on Stalingrad in the later summer of 1942, the winter counter-offensives of 1942/43, the Battle of Kursk in July (as part of the Central Front), then across Ukraine with the Central, Belorussian, and 1st Belorussian Fronts. In the summer of 1944, it was with the 2nd Tank Army, and took part in the offensives, reaching the outskirts of Warsaw. On 20 November 1944, it was awarded ‘Guards’ status and re-designated the 12th Guards Tank Corps. The Corps took part in the Vistula-Oder and Berlin Operations, ending the war in the Berlin area.

=== Cold War ===
As part of the occupation forces, it was assigned to the 2nd Guards Tank Army. On 6 July 1945, it was reorganized into the 12th Guards Tank Division at Neuruppin. In June 1946 the 2nd Guards Tank Army became the 2nd Guards Mechanized Army. On 6 May 1954, the division was reorganized. The 34th Guards Motor Rifle Regiment became the 145th Guards Mechanized Regiment. The 226th Guards Mortar Regiment and separate howitzer artillery battalion were combined into the 843rd Guards Artillery Regiment. The 18th Separate Guards Motorcycle Battalion became a reconnaissance battalion. Also, the Chemical Defence Company was formed. In 1957, the 2nd Guards Mechanized Army became a tank army again. On 25 June 1957, the 49th Guards Tank Regiment transferred to the 26th Guards Tank Division. The 66th Guards Tank Regiment was renamed the 353rd Guards Tank Regiment. The 71st Guards Heavy Tank Self-Propelled Regiment became the 332nd Guards Heavy Tank Regiment. The 145th Guards Mechanized Regiment became the 803rd Guards Motor Rifle Regiment. The 186th Separate Guards Communications Battalion was renumbered as the 490th. The 75th Guards Anti-Aircraft Artillery Regiment moved to the 207th Motor Rifle Division in 1958. It was replaced by the 933rd Anti-Aircraft Artillery Regiment.

In 1960, the 59th Separate Tank Training Battalion was disbanded. The 639th Separate Missile Battalion was formed in 1961. On 19 February 1962, the 64th Separate Equipment Maintenance and Recovery Battalion was created. The 136th Separate Guards Sapper Battalion became an engineer-sapper unit in 1968. In November of that year, the 803rd Guards Motor Rifle Regiment and 843rd Guards Artillery Regiment moved from the 25th Tank Division. That division's 400th Motor Rifle Regiment and 117th Artillery Regiment were transferred to the 12th Guards Division. The chemical defence company became the 129th Separate Chemical Defence Battalion in 1972. The motor transport battalion became the 1074th Separate Material Supply Battalion in 1980. The 400th Motor Rifle Regiment was replaced by the 200th Guards Motor Rifle Regiment in January 1983. The division became part of the 3rd Red Banner Army in May 1983. The army headquarters was located in the city of Magdeburg. Other divisions of the army were the 10th Guards Uralsko-Lvovskaya Tank Division, the 47th Guards Tank Division, and the 207th Motor Rifle Division. In September 1987 the 639th Separate Missile Battalion was transferred to the 442nd Missile Brigade.

Division headquarters was located in the town of Neuruppin. On the outskirts of town, closer to Altruppin was the location of the three regiments: 48th Guards Tank Regiment, the 353rd Guards Tank Regiment and 332nd Guards Tank Regiment. After the withdrawal from Germany, the 12th Guards Tank Division was disbanded. The commander of the 48th Guards Tank Regiment in 1989 was Colonel Kuhnovets. It was to be deactivated in the Moscow Military District, and the division actually disbanded around 1991.

In December 1990, the division moved to Vladikavkaz and became part of the North Caucasus Military District. It was disbanded in February 1991. The 200th Guards Motor Rifle Regiment and 18th Separate Guards Reconnaissance Battalion were transferred to the 19th Motor Rifle Division. The 933rd Anti-Aircraft Missile Regiment was directly subordinated to the 42nd Army Corps.

== Unit list ==
In 1988, the division comprised the following major units:

- 12th Guards Tank Uman Division (Neuruppin) (disbanded 1991)
  - 48th Guards Tank Vapnyarsko-Varshavsky Regiment (Neuruppin)
  - 332nd Guards Tank Warsaw Red Banner Order of Alexander Nevsky Regiment (Neuruppin)
  - 353rd Guards Rank Vapnyarsko-Berlin Regiment (Neuruppin)
  - 200th Guards Motor-Rifle Fastov Regiment (Burg)
  - 117th Artillery Regiment (Mahlwinkel)
  - 933rd Anti-Aircraft Missile Upper Dnieper Regiment (Burg)
  - 18th Separate Guards Reconnaissance Demblin Battalion (Mahlwinkel)
  - 490th Separate Guards Communications Battalion (Neuruppin)
  - 136th Separate Guards Demblin Engineer Battalion (Neuruppin)
  - 129th Separate Chemical Defence Battalion (Neuruppin)
  - 1074th Separate Material Supply Battalion (Wulkow)
  - 64th Separate Equipment Maintenance and Recovery Battalion (Neuruppin)
  - 208th Separate Medical Battalion (Neuruppin)
  - 90th Separates Motorized Battalion (Neuruppin)

== In popular culture ==
The division is first mentioned in the Cold War novel, The Red Effect by author Harvey Black, and is commanded by the fictitious Major General Oleg Turbin.
