= Mikhail Nikolayevich Smirnov (general) =

Soviet Army general

- Born: 8 November 1900; Nikolskoye-Otvodnoye, Vyatskoye volost, Danilovsky Uyezd, Yaroslavl Governorate, Russian Empire
- Died: 13 November 1967 (aged 67) Saratov, Soviet Union
- Allegiance: Russian SFSR; Soviet Union
- Branch: Red Army (later Soviet Army)
- Service years: 1919–1954
- Rank: Major general
- Commands: 380th Rifle Division; 6th Guards Airborne Division (became 113th Guards Rifle Division); Saratov Suvorov Military School
- Conflicts: Russian Civil War; Polish–Soviet War; World War II
- Awards: Order of Lenin

Mikhail Nikolayevich Smirnov (Russian: Михаи́л Никола́евич Смирно́в; 8 November 1900 – 13 November 1967) was a Soviet Army major general.

Drafted into the Red Army during the Russian Civil War, Smirnov became a junior commander and was captured after being wounded during the Polish–Soviet War. After being released by advancing Soviet forces, he continued to serve as a junior commander. He rose through command positions during the interwar period and by 1937 was a regimental commander. During the late 1930s Smirnov served as an instructor at military schools, and after the beginning of Operation Barbarossa became commander of the 380th Rifle Division in October 1941. He led the division during the Battles of Rzhev, but became a regimental commander and deputy division commander after being wounded. Transferring to command the 6th Guards Airborne Division in early 1943, Smirnov led the latter for the rest of the war and the immediate postwar period. His final post before retirement in 1954 was as commander of a Suvorov Military School.

== Early life and Russian Civil War ==
Smirnov was born on 8 November 1900 in the village of Nikolskoye-Otvodnoye, Vyatskoye volost, Danilovsky Uyezd, Yaroslavl Governorate. He was drafted into the Red Army in May 1919 during the Russian Civil War by the Danilovsky Uyezd military commissariat and sent to the Kostroma Infantry Command Courses. After graduating from the latter in October, Smirnov was sent to the headquarters of the Western Front in Smolensk, where he was appointed to a reserve regiment. In November, he was sent to the 469th Border Regiment of the 53rd Rifle Division, where he served as a platoon commander, assistant company commander, and company commander. With the regiment, he fought in the Polish–Soviet War. On 30 May 1920, near Koziany, Vilna Governorate, the regiment was surrounded and the battalion almost entirely destroyed. Smirnov was seriously wounded, and late in the day was picked up by Polish orderlies, after which he was sent to hospitals in Vilno and Grodno. In July he was released by the 3rd Cavalry Corps of G. D. Gai, and evacuated to a hospital in Moscow. There, in August, Smirnov was appointed a platoon commander in the 1st Reserve Regiment of the Moscow Military District. At the beginning of October he was transferred to hold the same position with the Moscow Naval Half-Crew, but at the end of the month left for the Nizhny Novgorod Naval Crew. At the end of November he was sent with a naval detachment to the Southern Front to the Sevastopol Naval Crew. In late January 1921, he was assigned to the Sevastopol Guard Battalion, in which he served as assistant commander and commander of a company.

== Interwar period ==
Sent to study at the S.S. Kamenev Higher Combined Military School in Kiev during November, upon graduation in August 1923, Smirnov was appointed a company commander in the 45th Rifle Regiment of the 15th Rifle Division of the Ukrainian Military District in Kherson. Between January and October 1924 he studied at the Higher School of Military Deception in Kiev, then returned to regiment and successively served as a company commander, assistant battalion commander, and battalion commander. In May 1933 he was appointed assistant commander for combat units of the 283rd Bessarabia Rifle Regiment of the 95th Rifle Division. From February to June 1936 he studied at the Vystrel courses in Bronnitsy, graduating with honors and returning to his previous position with the regiment. From March 1937, he served as regimental commander. Smirnov became inspector of rifle and tactical training and deputy chief of staff of the Kiev Corps of Higher Education Institutions of the Kiev Special Military District in January 1938. After the Kiev Corps of Higher Educations Institutions was disbanded, he became assistant head of the Odessa Infantry School in June, then became a tactics instructor at the Odessa Commanders' Advanced Training Courses (KUKS) of the reserve in August. In September 1939, Smirnov, now a major, was appointed assistant head for training and drill units of the Sverdlovsk Infantry School in the Ural Military District. From November 1940, he served as head of the Kansk Infantry School, transferred to Kemerovo and renamed the Kemerovo Infantry School.

== World War II ==
After the beginning of Operation Barbarossa, Smirnov continued to lead the school. In October, he was appointed commander of the 380th Rifle Division, forming at Slavgorod in the Siberian Military District. After the completion of its formation, the 380th was sent to the Karelian Front in the Vytegra area. Relocated to the Kalinin Front in the Nelidovo area during January, the division joined the 22nd Army, fighting with the latter in the Sychyovka–Vyazma Offensive from 21 February 1942. Smirnov was wounded on 13 March during fighting near the village of Trukhanovo, Kalinin Oblast, and after treatment became commander of the 1206th Rifle Regiment of the 362nd Rifle Division. After becoming deputy commander of the 186th Rifle Division of the 22nd Army in April, Smirnov participated in the occupation of a defensive line on the north bank of the Molodoy Tud along the line of Peredovo, Molodoy Tud, and Medvedevo. Returning to command of the 380th in September, Smirnov was transferred with it to the front's 39th Army. In late September, the division advanced to the Volga River and captured a bridgehead on the northern bank of the river, ten to twelve kilometers northwest of Rzhev. Until the end of December, it held defensive positions in the bridgehead, being transferred to the 30th Army of the front on 29 November.

After the 380th departed for the 1st Shock Army of the Northwestern Front, fighting southwest of Demyansk on 31 December, Smirnov transferred to command the 6th Guards Airborne Division in March 1943, which he led for the rest of the war. He led the 6th Guards Airborne in the failed Staraya Russa Offensive, after which it was withdrawn to the Reserve of the Supreme High Command (RVGK) in April. With the 5th Guards Army, it fought in the Battle of Prokhorovka during the Battle of Kursk in early July, then in the Belgorod-Kharkov Offensive. For his "constant and skillful leadership" of the division in the initial stages of the latter, Smirnov received the Order of the Red Banner on 5 September. From early September Smirnov led it in the Battle of the Dnieper. He was promoted to major general on 16 October. During the remainder of the war, Smirnov led the division in the Kirovograd Offensive, the Korsun–Shevchenkovsky Offensive, the Uman–Botoșani Offensive, the Second Jassy–Kishinev Offensive, the Budapest Offensive, the Bratislava–Brno Offensive, and the Prague Offensive. For his "exemplary fulfillment of command orders" and "courage" in the Second Jassy–Kishinev Offensive of late August 1944, Smirnov was awarded the Order of Suvorov, 2nd class, on 13 September of that year.

== Postwar ==
After the end of the war, Smirnov continued to command the 6th Guards, which were redesignated as the 113th Guards Rifle Division in July 1945 and transferred from the Central Group of Forces to the Taurida Military District. From April 1948, he commanded the 43rd Separate Guards Rifle Brigade, and in December of that year was sent to Rifle Division Commanders' Refresher Courses at the Frunze Military Academy. Upon graduation in 1950, Smirnov was appointed head of the Saratov Suvorov Military School, his final post before retirement in August 1954. He lived in Saratov before dying there on 13 March 1967.

== Awards and honors ==
Order of Lenin (21 February 1945)
Order of the Red Banner, thrice (5 September 1943, 3 November 1944, 15 November 1950)
Order of Suvorov, 2nd class (13 June 1944)
Order of Kutuzov, 2nd class, twice (19 January 1944, 28 April 1945)
Medal "For the Capture of Budapest" (1945)
Medal "For the Capture of Vienna" (1945)
Medal "For the Liberation of Prague" (1945)
Medal "For the Victory over Germany in the Great Patriotic War 1941–1945" (1945)
Jubilee Medal "XX Years of the Workers' and Peasants' Red Army" (1938)
Jubilee Medal "30 Years of the Soviet Army and Navy" (1948)
Jubilee Medal "Twenty Years of Victory in the Great Patriotic War 1941-1945" (1965)
Order "Protection of the Fatherland", 2nd class (Romania)
Medal "For Liberation from Fascism" (Romania)

- Honorary Citizen of Bratislava (Czechoslovakia)
