= Dubovoy =

Dubovoy Дубовой
- Khutor
- Location within Voronezh Oblast Location within Russia
- Coordinates: 51°08′N 39°01′E
- Country: Russia
- Region: Voronezh Oblast
- District: Ostrogozhsky District
- Time zone: UTC+3:00

Dubovoy (Russian: Дубовой) is a rural locality (a khutor) in Boldyrevskoye Rural Settlement, Ostrogozhsky District, Voronezh Oblast, Russia. The population was 496 as of 2010. There are 2 streets.

== Geography ==
Dubovoy is located 37 km north of Ostrogozhsk (the district's administrative centre) by road. Boldyrevka is the nearest rural locality.
