= Shuravi =

Persian term for the word "Soviet"

Shuravi, shouravi, or shurwi (Dari: شوروی, Tajik: Шуравӣ) is the Persian term for the word "Soviet" or just "Soviet Union", it has been derived from the word shura (شورا), a word of Arabic origin meaning "council".

This term is also the collective image of Soviet soldiers and military specialists in Afghanistan. The image has been widely spread among Afghan people. A motto "Marg bar shouravi", meaning "death to the Soviets", was popular among mujahideen. Conversely, the motto "Vivat, shuravi!", meaning "long live the Soviets", was adopted by the supporters of the Democratic Republic of Afghanistan.

Russian veterans of Soviet–Afghan War often call themselves Shuravi. The word is used in Iran meaning "USSR".
