= Kirovograd offensive =

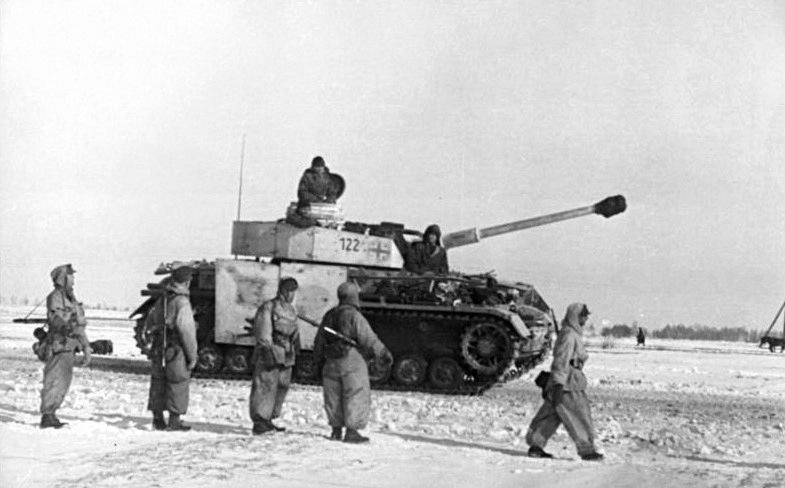
- German troops and Panzer IV in Ukraine, January 1944
Date	5-16 January 1944 (Soviet offensive phase)
Location	Kirovograd region
Result	Soviet victory

Belligerents
Soviet Union	Germany

Commanders and leaders
Ivan Konev	Otto Wöhler

Units involved
2nd Ukrainian Front	8th Army: XI Army Corps; XXXXVII Panzer Corps; LII Army Corps; GHQ units directly subordinated to the army

Strength
1 January 1944: 550,000 personnel in total; 265 tanks; 127 self-propelled guns; 7,136 guns and mortars; 777 anti-aircraft guns; 500 combat aircraft	Personnel strength on 31 December 1943: 260,000 personnel in total AFV status on 1 January 1944; Operational: 110 tanks; 62 assault guns; 71 self-propelled AT guns and artillery pieces In short-term repair: 132 tanks; 15 assault guns; 35 self-propelled AT guns and artillery pieces

Casualties and losses
Exact unknown	Exact unknown

The Kirovograd offensive operation (Russian: Кировоградская наступательная операция, Ukrainian: Кіровогра́дська наступа́льна опера́ція), known on the German side as The defensive battle in the Kirovograd area (Die Abwehrschlacht im Raum von Kirowograd), was an offensive by the Red Army's 2nd Ukrainian Front against the German 8th Army of Army Group South in the area of Kirovograd in central Ukraine between 5 and 16 January 1944. It took place on the Eastern Front of World War II and was part of the wider Dnieper–Carpathian offensive, a Soviet attack against Army Group South that aimed to retake the rest of Ukraine west of the Dnieper river, which had been occupied by Germany in 1941.

== Background ==
After crossing the Dnieper in September 1943, Army General Ivan Konev's 2nd Ukrainian Front pushed back German troops in fierce fighting, advancing between 30 and 100 kilometers on the right bank of the river while capturing Cherkassy, Znamianka, and Aleksandriya by mid-December.

== Prelude ==
On 20 December, Konev reported to Stavka that, as a result of the preceding fighting, Soviet troops had cleared the right bank of the Dnieper in his front's sector. He requested approval for his decision to temporarily switch the front's center and left flank to the defensive in order to receive reinforcements and replenish equipment pending an attack towards Krivoi Rog between 5 and 10 January 1944. Stavka approved his plan, setting the date of the offensive between 5 and 7 January. The front was reinforced by the 4th Ukrainian Front's 5th Guards Cavalry Corps, which arrived around the end of December, as well as 300 tanks and 100 self-propelled guns.

In accordance with Stavka instructions, Konev and his staff developed a plan for the offensive. The front command proposed an attack towards Kazanka and Bereznegovatoye in the rear of the German troops around Nikopol. The 2nd Ukrainian Front was then to defeat the German troops around Nikopol in conjunction with the 3rd and 4th Ukrainian Fronts. Due to the advances of the 1st Ukrainian Front in the Zhitomir–Berdichev offensive, Stavka decided to change the plan. On 29 December, it issued a new directive, which ordered the front to resume the offensive by attacking towards Kirovograd with at least four armies (one of which was to be a tank army) no later than 5 January. The attack was to destroy the German troops around Kirovograd and capture the city from the north and south. The front was to then capture Novoukrainka and Pomoshnaya, advancing to Pervomaisk on the Southern Bug, where it was to capture a bridgehead. Simultaneously, the front was to mount a secondary attack with two armies towards Shpola and Khristinovka.

The attack towards Kirovograd and Pervomaisk was intended to split the German troops in Right-bank Ukraine in half, thereby assisting the 1st and 3rd Ukrainian Fronts. The secondary attack was meant to help the 1st Ukrainian Front encircle and defeat German troops in the area of Kanev and Zvenigorodka. In accordance with the directive, Konev modified the plan for the offensive. Lieutenant General Konstantin Koroteyev's 52nd Army was to attack towards Balakleya, Shpola, and then Khristinovka, turning its troops towards Korsun-Shevchenkovsky. Lieutenant General Ivan Galanin's 53rd Army, supported by Major General Boris Skvortsov's 5th Guards Mechanized Corps, was to attack towards Mala Vyska.

For the main attack towards Kirovograd, the front utilized two shock groups. The northern shock group, including Lieutenant General Aleksey Semenovich Zhadov's 5th Guards Army and Major General Fyodor Katkov's 7th Mechanized Corps, was to attack the city from the northwest. The southern shock group, with Colonel General Mikhail Shumilov's 7th Guards Army and Colonel General Pavel Rotmistrov's 5th Guards Tank Army, was to attack from the southwest, tasked with encircling and destroying the German troops in the Kirovograd area, then develop the offensive towards Novoukrainka and Pomoshnaya.

== Comparison of forces ==
By the beginning of January, the 2nd Ukrainian Front included the 4th, 5th, and 7th Guards Armies, the 37th, 52nd, 53rd, and 57th Armies, the 5th Guards Tank Army, the 5th Guards Cavalry Corps, 20th Tank Corps, and 1st, 7th, and 8th Mechanized Corps. Air support was provided by the 5th Air Army. The front fielded a total of 59 rifle divisions, three cavalry divisions, and three tank and four mechanized corps. Before the operation, the 7th Mechanized Corps was transferred to the 5th Guards Army, and the 8th Mechanized Corps to the 5th Guards Tank Army. By 1 January, the front numbered 550,000 men, 265 tanks, 127 self-propelled guns, 7,136 guns and mortars, 777 anti-aircraft guns, and 500 combat aircraft.

== Memory ==
In 1950, inside the Fortress of St. Elizabeth, the memorial complex “Pantheon of Eternal Glory” was created, where about 50 000 victims of the occupiers and several thousand soldiers who died for the liberation of the city were buried. Of these about 30 were awarded the title of Hero of the Soviet Union, and only one, Hryhoriy Kuropyatnykov, was a native of the city.

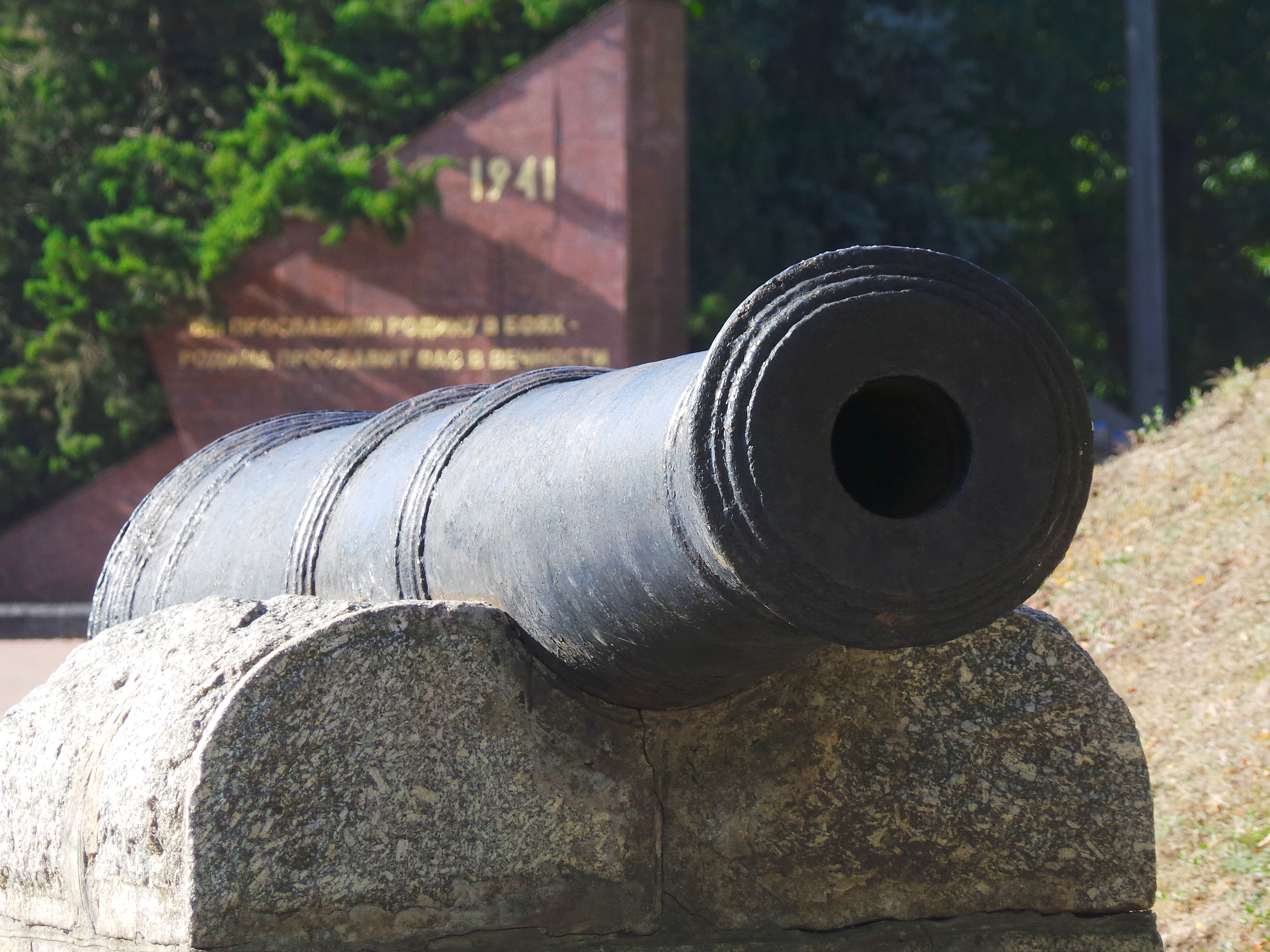
One of the cannons at the entrance to the fortress

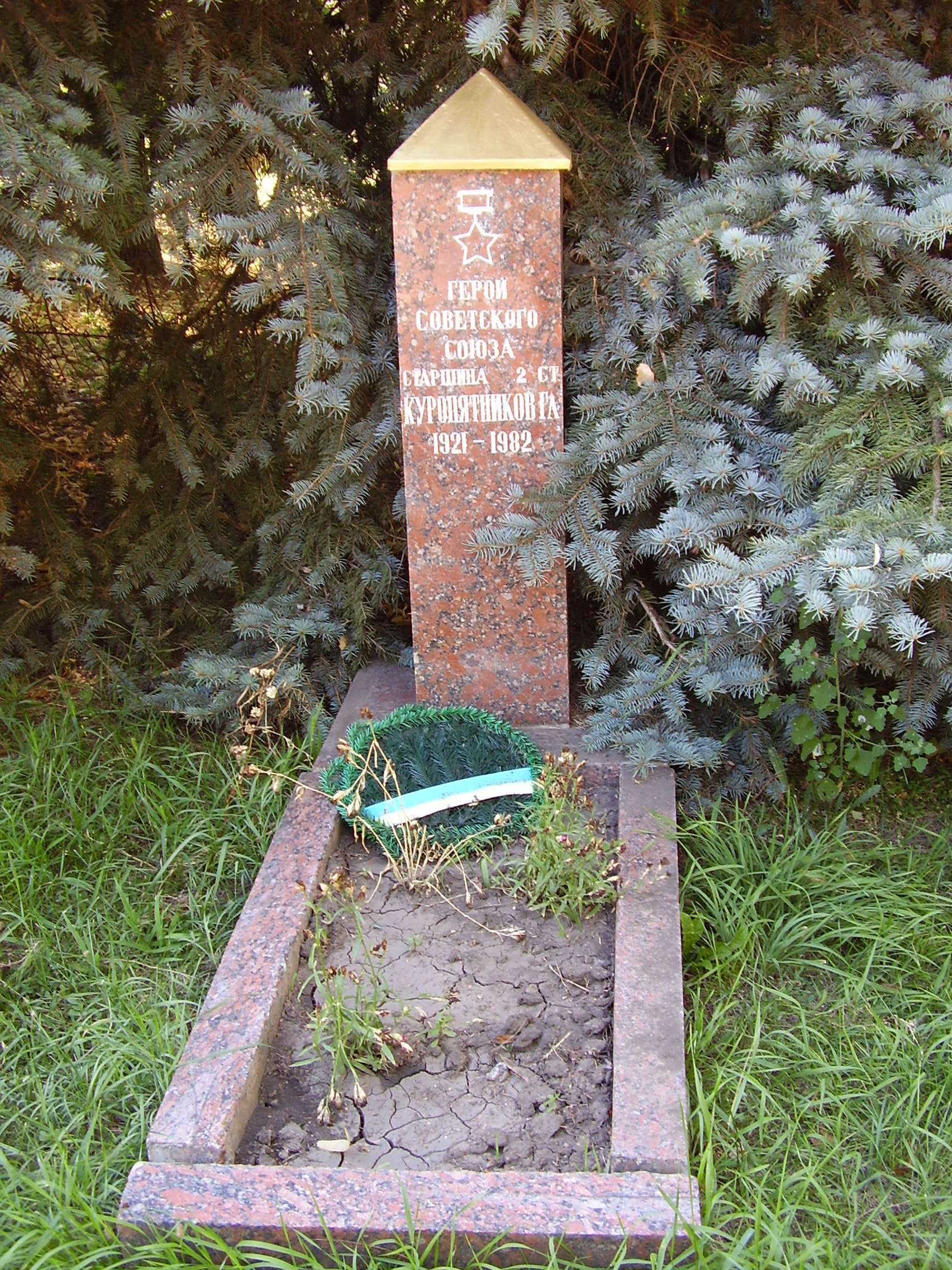
The grave of Kuropyatnykov

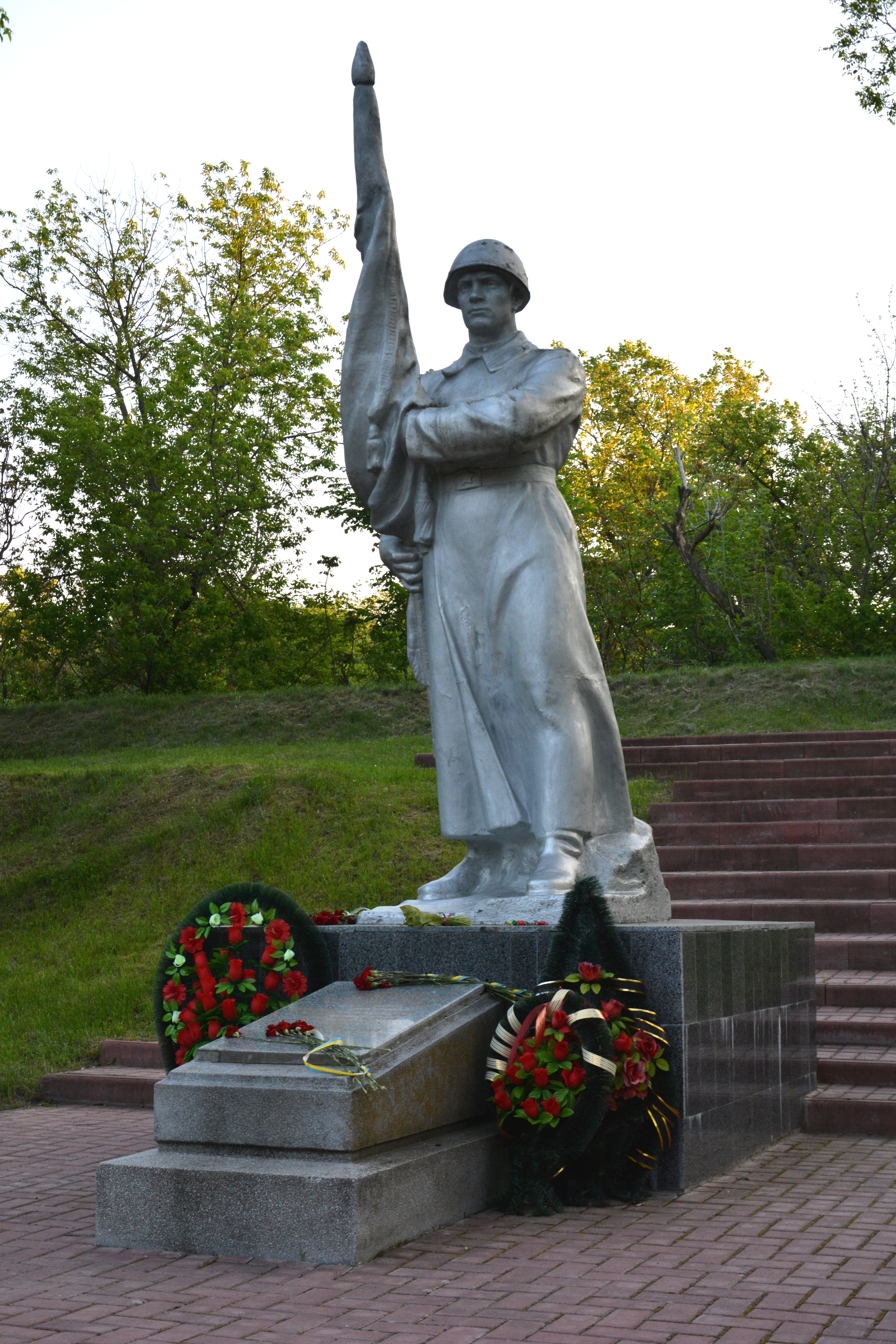
Monument to victims of Nazism

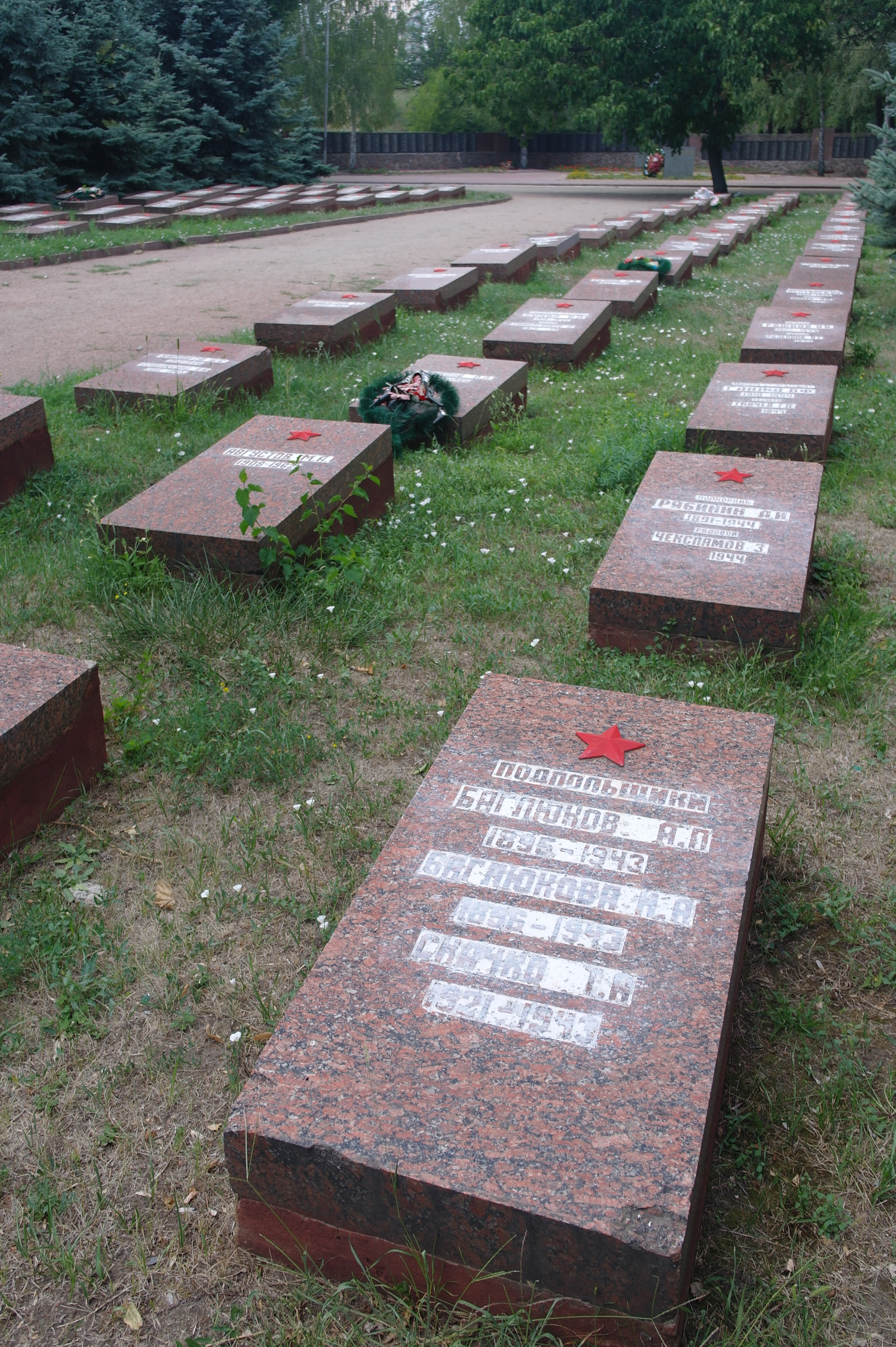
Partisan graves

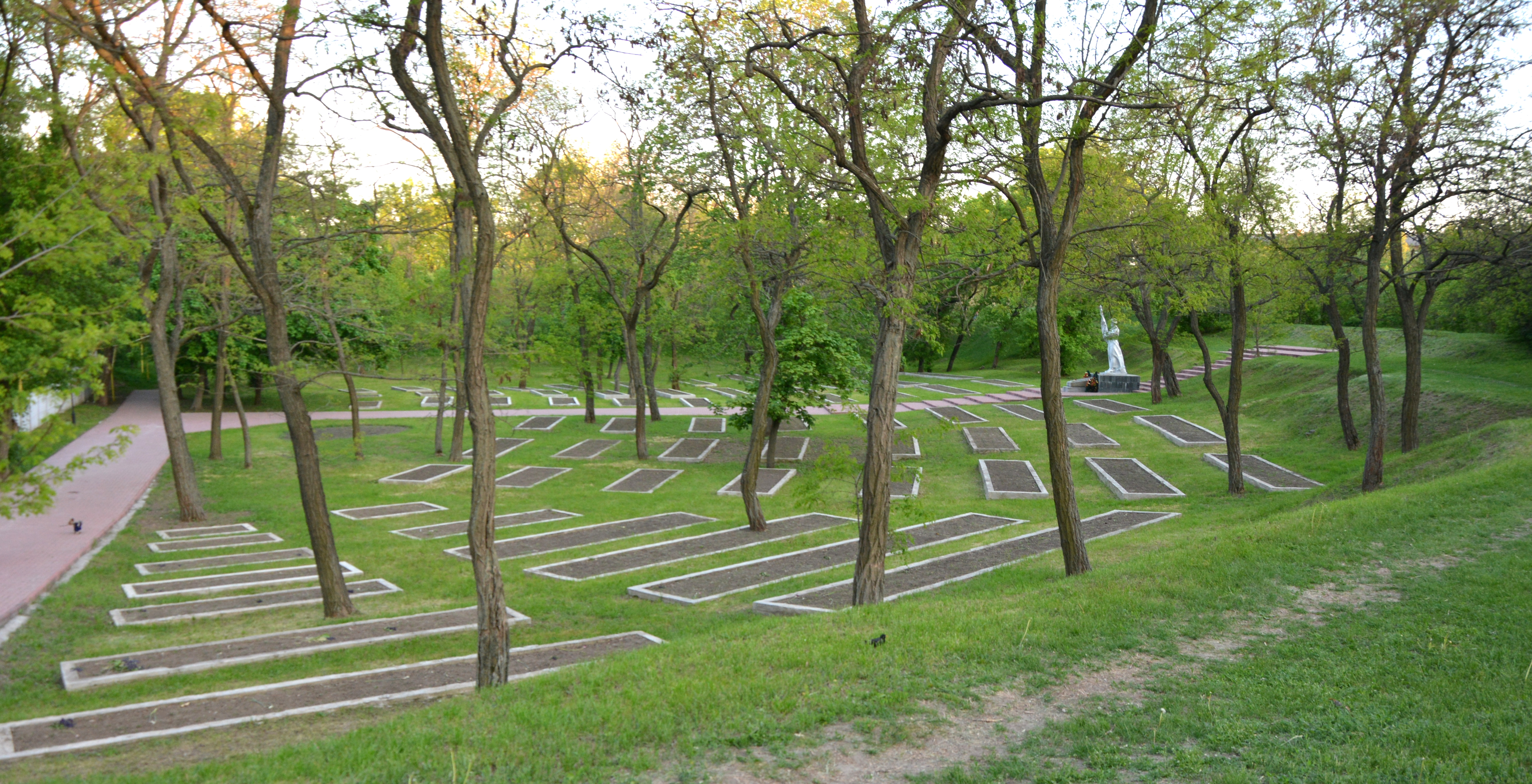
Graves of victims of occupation

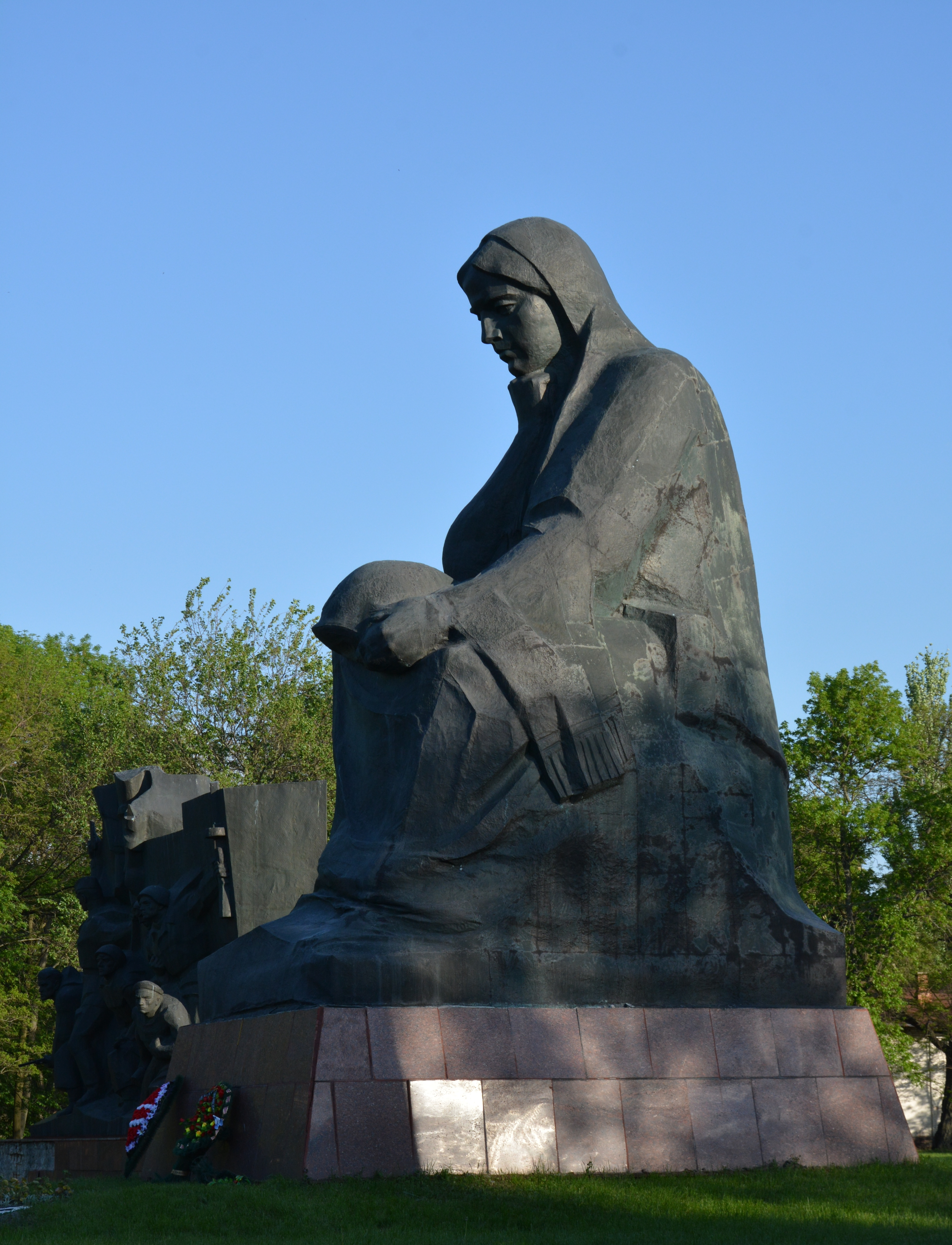
Monument "Grieving Motherland"

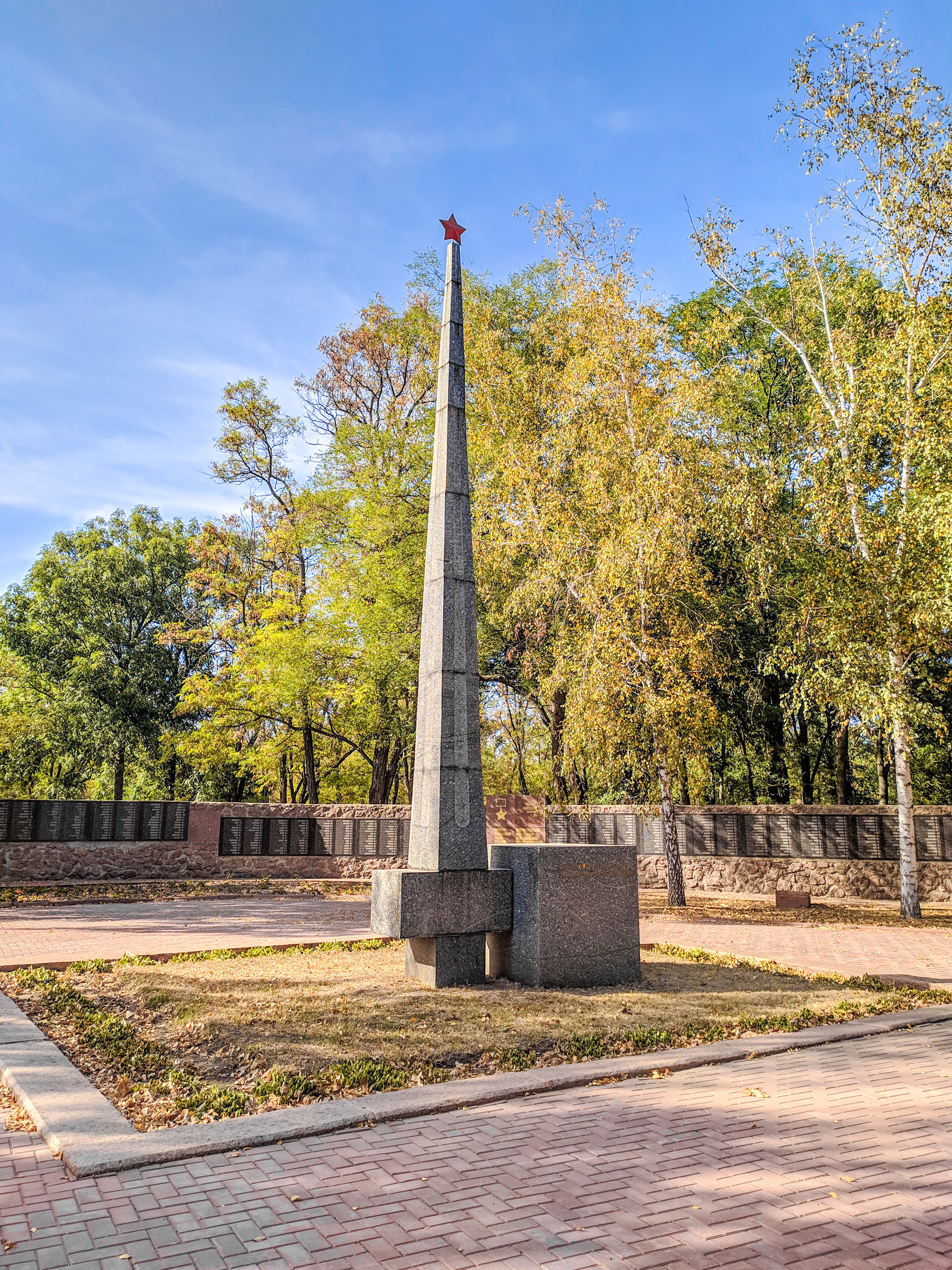
Memory wall
