= 5th Guards Motor Rifle Division =

Motor rifle division of the Soviet military

6th Mechanized Corps (1940–1941) (1942–1943) 5th Guards Mechanized Corps (1943–1945) 5th Guards Mechanized Division (1945–1957) 53rd Guards Motor Rifle Division (1957–1965) 5th Guards Motor Rifle Division (1965–1989)
- Active: 1940 – early 1990s (including the early Mechanized Corps)
- Country: Soviet Union
- Branch: Red Army (1940-1946); Soviet Army (1946-1990s)
- Type: Mechanised Infantry
- Size: Division
- Part of: 40th Army (Soviet Union) (1979–1988)
- Patron: 60th Anniversary of the USSR
- Engagements: World War II; Soviet–Afghan War
- Decorations: Order of Kutuzov II Degree
- Battle honours: Zimovnikovskaya

Commanders
- Notable commanders: Mikhail Khatskilevich; Semyon Bogdanov; Boris Skvortsov

The 5th Guards Zimovnikovskaya Red Banner, Order of Kutuzov 60th Anniversary of the USSR Motor Rifle Division, (Military Unit Number (V/Ch) 51852 from 1979) was a military formation of the Soviet Ground Forces. It was formed from the 6th Mechanized Corps created in 1940 and destroyed in 1941 in the beginning of Operation Barbarossa. The corps was reformed in November 1942 under the same name, but with a different organizational structure. In January 1943, the 6th Mechanized Corps was granted Guards status and became the 5th Guards Mechanized Corps.

It was renamed the 5th Guards Mechanized Division in 1945, and subsequently the 5th Guards Motor Rifle Division in 1965.

== History ==
=== Creation of 6th Mechanized Corps ===
The 6th Mechanised Corps was formed on 15 July 1940 at Białystok in the Western Special Military District. It was attached to the 10th Army in the Białystok area and was under the command of Major General Mikhail Khatskilevich when Operation Barbarossa began in June 1941.

The Corps initially comprised the 4th and 7th Tank Divisions and the 29th Mechanized Division, as well as several smaller units. On 22 June 1941, the 6th Mechanized Corps consisted of 32,382 men, 1,131 tanks, 242 armored cars, 162 artillery pieces, 187 mortars, 4,779 vehicles, 294 tractors and 1042 motorcycles. It included light tanks such as the T-26, Bt-7 and Bt-5 and T-28, as well as 201 of the newer T-34 and KV-1 models in the 7th Tank Division and a further 151 in the 4th Tank Division.

A report by Major General B. S. Vasil'evich, commander of 7th Tank Division, on 4 August 1941 said that the division had been at 98% enlisted strength and 60–80% officer strength. The division included 348 tanks, of which 51 were KVs and 150 T-34s. However, there was lack of supplies. It possessed only one to one and a half loads of 76 mm ammunition when it entered battle, no armor-piercing ammunition for its tanks, three refills of gasoline, and a single fill of diesel fuel. The fuel ran out quickly, partially due to unclear orders. The division had to move to three new assembly areas within the first two days of the war. The division was soon immobilized south of Grodno in Belarus.

Similar to the 4th Mechanized Corps, the 6th Mechanized Corps stood out of the remaining mechanized corps of the Red Army.

On 22 June 1941 it was fully formed, and stationed 100–150 kilometers from the border.

=== Defeat in Operation Barbarossa ===
The 6th Mechanized Corps was heavily involved in the first battles with Germans. At 11:40 pm on the day of German invasion, Pavlov ordered his Deputy Front Commander Lieutenant General Ivan Boldin to take command over what would be later called Boldin's group. The group's core was the 6th Mechanized Corps and the 6th Cavalry Corps, with 11th Mechanized Corps to be attached soon. Boldin's group first and last mission was against German armored forces of Hoth's 3rd Panzergruppe advancing at the vulnerable boundary line between Soviet Northwestern Front and Soviet Western Front at Merkinė. It is considered part of the larger Battle of Białystok–Minsk.

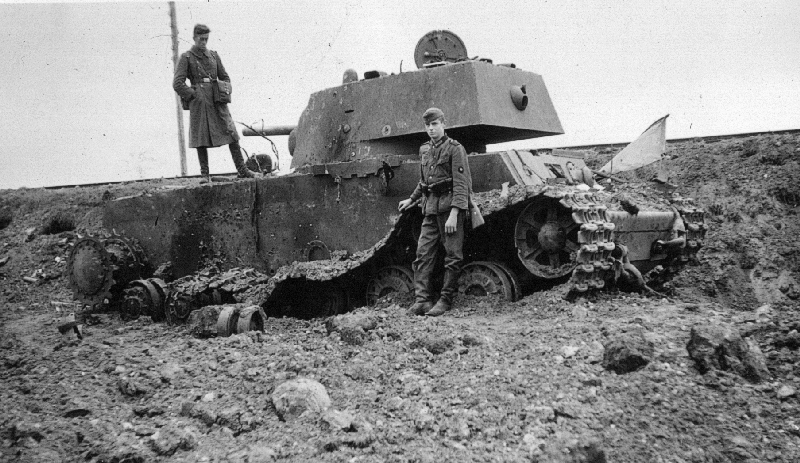
A destroyed KV-1 is inspected by German Troops in Russia in 1941

Historian David Glantz stated that the tank divisions of 6th Mechanized Corps on 24 June 1941 were inferior against the advancing German units often without infantry support and were relentlessly pounded by the German aircraft of the Luftflotte 2. Without adequate ammunition and with many tanks in a state of disrepair and sent to several different locations without fuel reserves, they were quickly immobilized. A report from the Western Front on 27 June noted that 6th Mechanized Corps had lost 20–26% of its tank strength in its 4th and 7th tank Divisions.

Solonin states that the only battle that 6th Mechanized Corps saw was an attack of 24 June, when it lost 2% of tanks. The corps dissipated soon without any other combat, with negligible losses to aircraft, and with distance traveled that hardly necessitated any fuel tanking or repairs. The corps dispersed on 27 June near Krynki, with the personnel retreating east in small groups, and the equipment being abandoned or destroyed en masse. Communication with the headquarters of Boldin was lost and Major General Khatskilevich was killed on 25 June 1941.

Hoth's panzers had reached Vilnius on 23 June, then Grodno, and finally Minsk by 26 June. By 25 June 1941 General Heinz Guderian's 2nd Panzergruppe reached Slonim and Vawkavysk and cut off the retreat of the greater part of the 10th and 3rd Armies at Białystok encirclement. The Soviet armies could not retreat across the Shchara River because Luftflotte 2 had destroyed the bridges. Guderian's "pincer" reached Minsk on 27 June trapping the greater part of 13th and 4th Armies in another encirclement west of the city.

The 6th Mechanized Corps was destroyed in the Białystok encirclement. It was formally dissolved in late July 1941.

=== Second formation ===
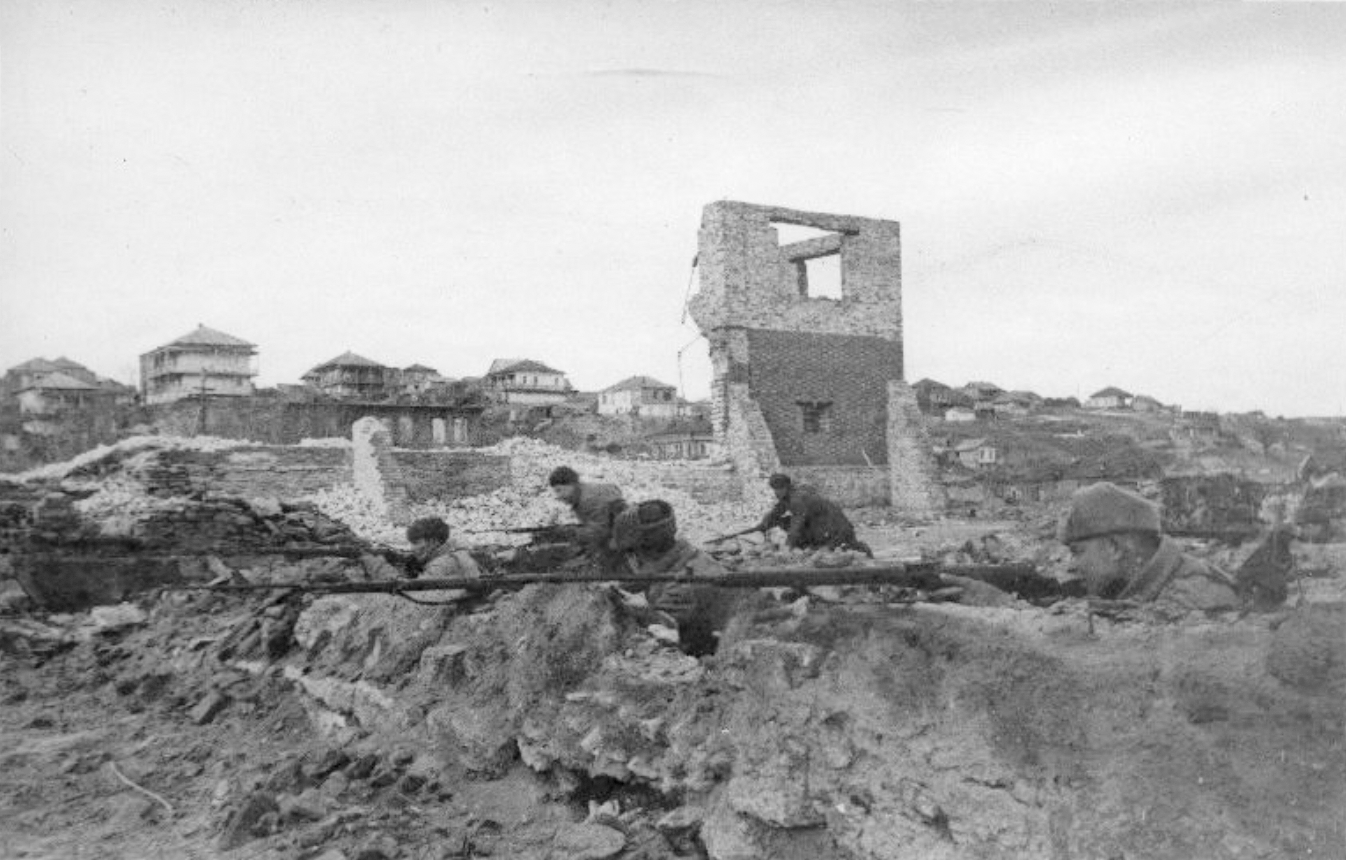
Troops of the corps' 54th Mechanized Brigade clearing the stanitsa of Tsimlyanskaya from Germans, January 1943

The idea of mechanized corps were revived in the spring of 1942. The second formation of 6th Mechanized Corps was assembled in November 1942. On the basis of Headquarters' 14th Tank Corps, the 6th Mechanized Corps was reformed on Nov. 26, 1942 at the station Kostereva in accordance with NKO directive number 11905907ss and GABTU number 1105723 dated November 26, 1942. Major General of Armored Forces Semyon Ilyich Bogdanov was appointed the commander of the 6th Mechanized Corps.

On December 18, 1942, 6th Mechanized Corps was assigned to the 2nd Guards Army of the Southern Front, where it was involved in stopping the onset of Operation Winter Storm. The Manstein's attempted breakthrough to the Sixth Army stationed in Stalingrad. On January 8, 1943, the Corps – participating in the counterattack – captured the Zimovniki station (Rostov Oblast), a vital point of the Luftwaffe's munitions supply chain. For this reason the Corps was given the honorific Zimovnikovsky. Soon it was raised to the elite "Guards" status; thus it became the 5th Zimovnikovsky Guards Mechanised Corps.

The Corps participated in the Battle of Kursk, as a part of 5th Guards Tank Army. On 1 August 1943, it comprised the 10th, 11th and 12th Guards Mechanised Brigades, 24th Guards Tank Brigade, and smaller supporting units. Alongside other units, it fought in the southern part of salient against the elite 3rd SS Panzer Division Totenkopf and drove them out of Belgorod. In 1944, the 5th Guards Mechanized Corps took part in the elimination of the Korsun-Cherkasy Pocket.

Later in 1944 the 5th Zimovnikovsky Guards Mechanized Corps fought in Moravia and Upper Silesia. As part of the 4th Guards Tank Army it crossed the Oder and Neisse. At the end of April 1945, it took part in the Battle of Berlin. After taking Berlin, the Corps was engaged from 6 to 11 May 1945 in the Prague Offensive. On May 8, 1945, the 10th Mechanized Brigade of the Corps was the first to enter the Czech capital, for which the unit received the Prague honorific.

=== Postwar ===
After the war, on 10 June 1945, the 5th Guards Mechanized Corps became the 5th Guards Mechanised Division. On 25 June 1957, it was renamed 53rd Guards Motor Rifle Division. On 11 January 1965, it became the 5th Guards Motor Rifle Division. On 17 December 1982 it was named "The 60th anniversary of the USSR".

On 28 June 1945, the division was awarded the Order of Kutuzov, 2nd degree. In 1946, the division was redeployed to the Turkestan Military District and became part of the 1st Army Corps, stationed on the territory of the Turkmen SSR. From the time of its reassignment to the 53rd Guards MRD, it was based at Kushka, Mary Oblast in the Turkmen Soviet Socialist Republic.

The division had the Military Unit Number (V/Ch) 11904 until the invasion of Afghanistan (December, 1979) upon which the V/Ch changed to 51852.

=== Soviet-Afghan War ===
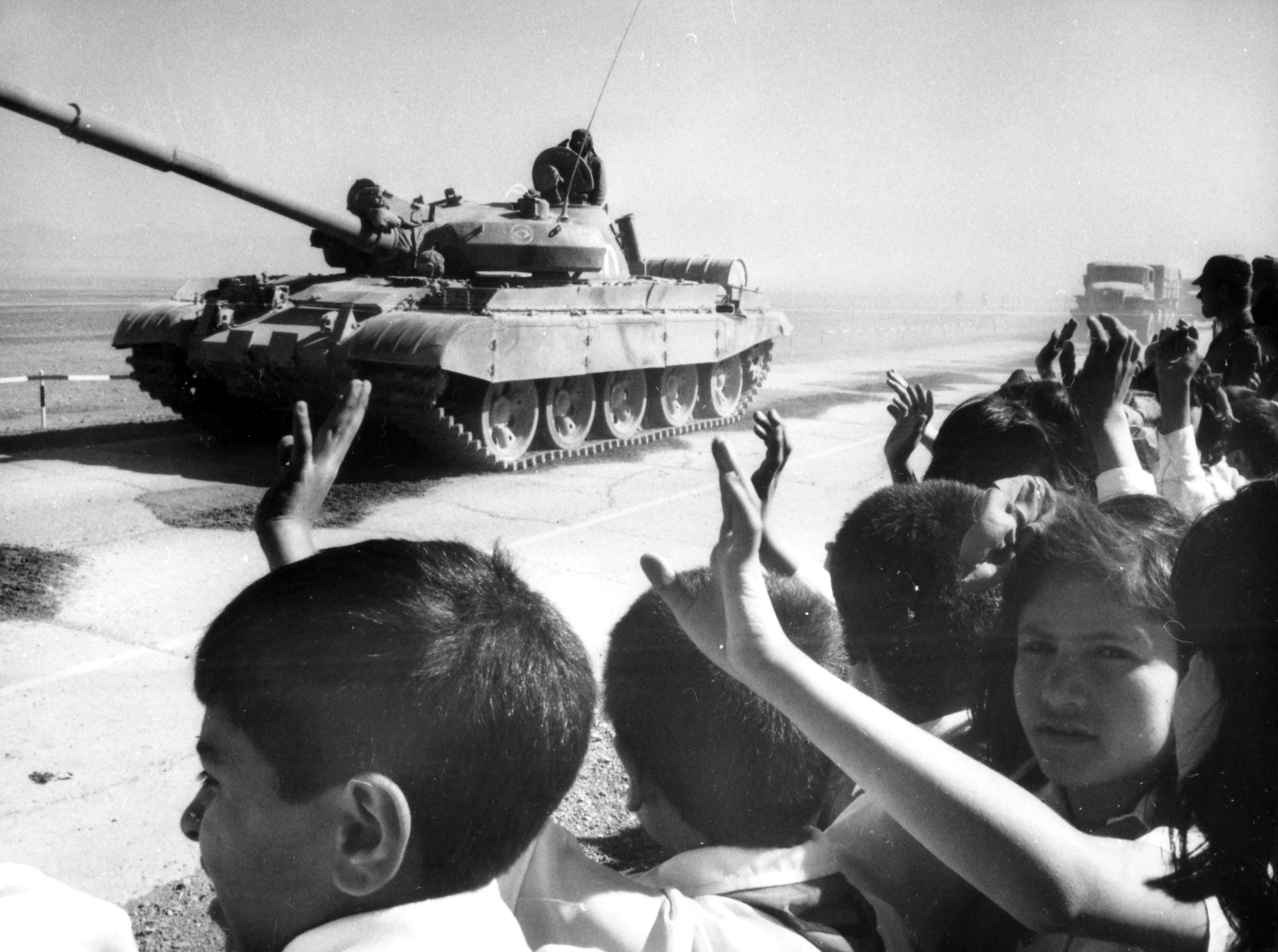
A column of weapons and military equipment of the 24th Tank Regiment of the 5th Division, during the partial withdrawal of Soviet troops from Afghanistan, October 1986

On the night of 27-28 December, the division entered Afghanistan from Gushgy bound for Herat and Shindand. A battalion of the 56th Guards Air Assault Brigade attached to the division had already taken control of the Rabati-Mirza pass between Gushgy and Herat on 26 December.

On 26 December at 20:00, the commander of the division, Major-General Yuri Shatalin, gave the order to cross the Afghan border. The division moved out of Gushgy, Tagtabazar, and Ýolöten. At the appointed time, the division's units reached their future deployment points near the cities of Herat, Shindand, and Kandahar; the division headquarters was located near Shindand. At this stage, the division suffered two casualties. Shatalin recalled:

It happened at dawn on 27 December. I was surprised: 5 o'clock in the morning, and the streets were full of people with flowers. It turned out that they were greeting the "shuravi", as they began to call us, Soviet soldiers. There was a similar warm welcome in other towns and villages in northern Afghanistan.

From the summer of 1980, the division began to participate in raids against bands of mujahideen; in total, during the war, the division participated in 156 combat operations.

On 1 March 1980 the division was reorganized. The 373rd Guards Red Banner Order of Kutuzov and Bogdan Khmelnitsky Motor Rifle Regiment, had formed part of the division on its arrival in the country. It had been stationed in Adraskan. On 1 March 1980, the regiment was reorganized as the 70th Separate Guards Motor Rifle Brigade, by reorganizing the staffing structure of departments and integrating the 2nd Battalion of the 56th Guards Air Assault Brigade. After the reorganization the brigade was relocated to the city of Kandahar.

From 1980 to 1982, the division was commanded by the future commander of the 40th Army, General Boris Gromov.

In October-December 1981, the entire division became incapacitated when more than three thousand men (more than a quarter of the division's strength) fell ill with hepatitis, including most of the staff officers and two of the four regiment commanders.

In March 1985 the 12th Guards Motorized Rifle Regiment arrived from Kaliningrad and joined the division.

On 15 February 1989, the last unit of the 40th Army, along with Gromov, left Afghanistan. The withdrawal was carried out by two methods: by air (5,142 people) and by land (6,986 people). 10 columns from 4 garrisons were withdrawn (Shindand, Adraskan, Herat, Turgundi).

During the Afghan war, four servicemen of the division were awarded the Hero of the Soviet Union, and 12,825 in total were awarded orders and medals. From May 1988, in accordance with the Geneva Accords, the division began preparing to withdraw from Afghanistan. The withdrawal of the 5th GMRD began as scheduled on 29 January 1989 and ended 15 February 1989. The division was relocated permanently to the city of Gushgy.

Total number of killed in the division from 27 December 1979 to 15 February 1989 was 1135 (910 of them in combat).

The division was absorbed into the 88th Motor Rifle Division in March 1989.

==== Organisation ====
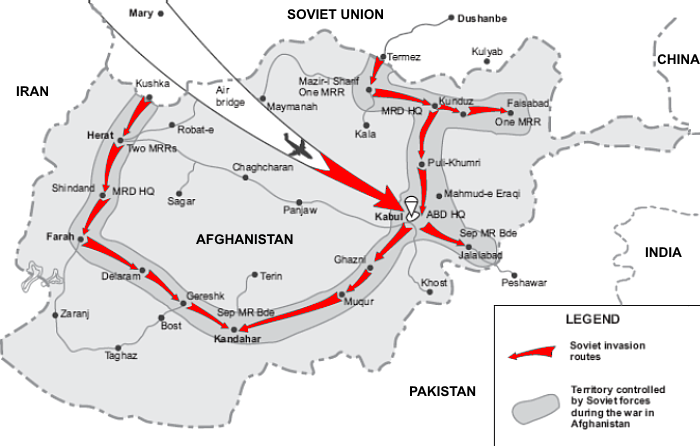
Invasion map

In Afghanistan war (1979–1989), the 5th GMRD comprised

- Divisional Headquarters – Shindand.
  - Agitotryad.
  - Headquarters company.
  - Bakery.
  - 795th Station courier mail service.
  - 251st Battery Management and artillery reconnaissance.
  - 814th military fire brigade.
  - 582nd-second bath and laundry item
  - Field establishment of the State Bank of the USSR
  - 164th Separate flame thrower Company(before March 1985 – 164th Separate Company of Chemical Protection).
- 101st Motor Rifle Regiment – Herat
- 371st Guards Berlin Orders of Suvorov and Bogdan Khmelnitsky Motor Rifle Regiment – Shindand.
- 12th Guards Red Banner Order of Kutuzov and Bogdan Khmelnitsky Motor Rifle Regiment – Herat.
- 24th Guards Prague Orders of Suvorov and Bogdan Khmelnitsky Tank Regiment – Shindand.
- 1060th Artillery regiment Shindand.
- 1122nd Sevastopol Redflag Antiaircraft Artillery Regiment – Shindand.
- 1377th Separate Antitank Artillery Battalion Shindand.
- 650th separate Prague Order of Alexander Nevsky reconnaissance battalion. Shindand.
- 68th Guards separate engineering battalion. pos. Adraskan.
- 388th separate battalion. Shindand.
- 307th separate missile division. Herat.
- 177th separate repair battalion of recovery Shindand.
- 375th independent battalion of material support Shindand.
- 46th separate medical-sanitary battalion Herat.

=== After the withdrawal from Afghanistan ===
After the collapse of the Soviet Union, 'Zimovnikovskoy,' a unit of Turkmenistan's Ministry of Defense was established with the honorary title of "Turkmenbashi Saparmurat Niyazov's" located in Gushgy, based on the 5th GMRD.

== Heroes of the Soviet Union awarded to the 5th Guards Motor Rifle Division ==
- Captain Kuchkin Gennady Pavlovich, Hero of the Soviet Union
- Colonel Vladimir Neverov Lavrentyevich, Hero of the Soviet Union
- Captain Fyodor Ivanovich Pugachev, Hero of the Soviet Union
- Captain Sergey Gushin, Hero of the Soviet Union
