= Osa, Perm Krai =

Town in Perm Krai, Russia

Osa Оса
- Town
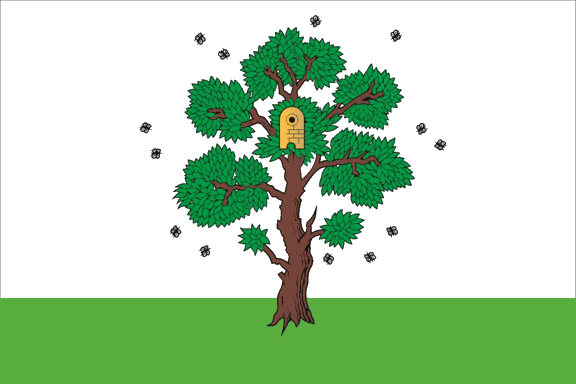
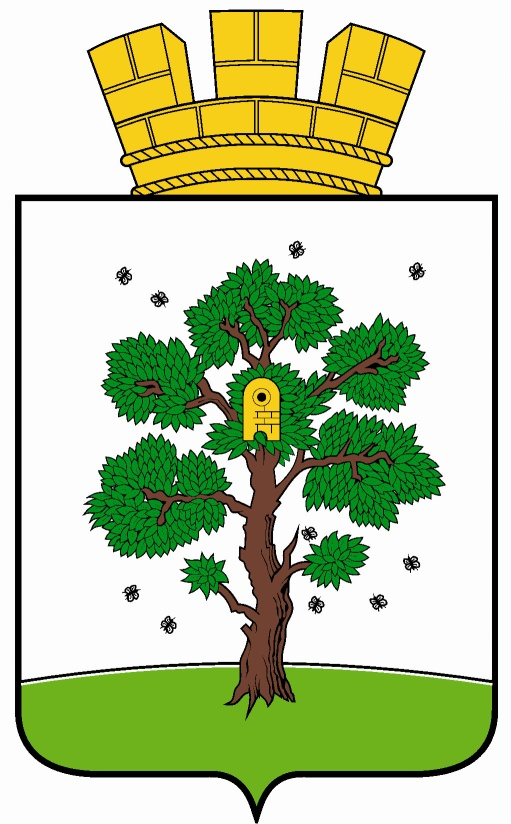
- Flag Coat of arms
- Interactive map of Osa
- Location of Osa Osa (Perm Krai)
- Coordinates: 57°18′N 55°28′E
- Country: Russia
- Federal subject: Perm Krai
- Administrative district: Osinsky District
- Founded: 1591 or 1596
- Town status since: 1739
- Elevation: 100 m (330 ft)

Population (2010 Census)
  - Total: 21,188
  - Estimate (2023): 19,369 (−8.6%)

Administrative status
  - Capital of: Osinsky District

Municipal status
  - Municipal district: Osinsky Municipal District
  - Urban settlement: Osinskoye Urban Settlement
  - Capital of: Osinsky Municipal District, Osinskoye Urban Settlement
- Time zone: UTC+5 (MSK+2)
- Postal codes: 618120, 618122, 618149
- OKTMO ID: 57640101001
- Website: osa.perm.ru

Osa (Russian: Оса́) is a town and the administrative center of Osinsky District in Perm Krai, Russia, located on the left bank of the Kama River near its confluence with the Tulva, 146 kilometers (91 mi) southwest of Perm, the administrative center of the krai. As of the 2010 Census, its population was 21,188.

== History ==
It was founded in 1591 (according to other sources—in 1596) as the sloboda of Novonikolskaya (Новонико́льская) and later became a fortress. In a 1623 document, the settlement is referred to as the sloboda of Osinskaya Nikolskaya (Осинская Никольская), in 1678—as the sloboda of Osinskaya (Осинская), in 1732—as the village (selo) of Osa. It was granted town status in 1739. In 1960, oil fields were discovered near Osa. Oil extraction started in 1963.

== Administrative and municipal status ==
Within the framework of administrative divisions, Osa serves as the administrative center of Osinsky District, to which it is directly subordinated. As a municipal division, the town of Osa, together with five rural localities, is incorporated within Osinsky Municipal District as Osinskoye Urban Settlement.

== Demographics ==
Historical population
Year	1939	1959	1979	1989	2002	2010
Pop.	9,600	12,700	19,993	24,132	23,452	21,191
±%	—	—	—	+20.7%	−2.8%	−9.6%
