= Tulva =

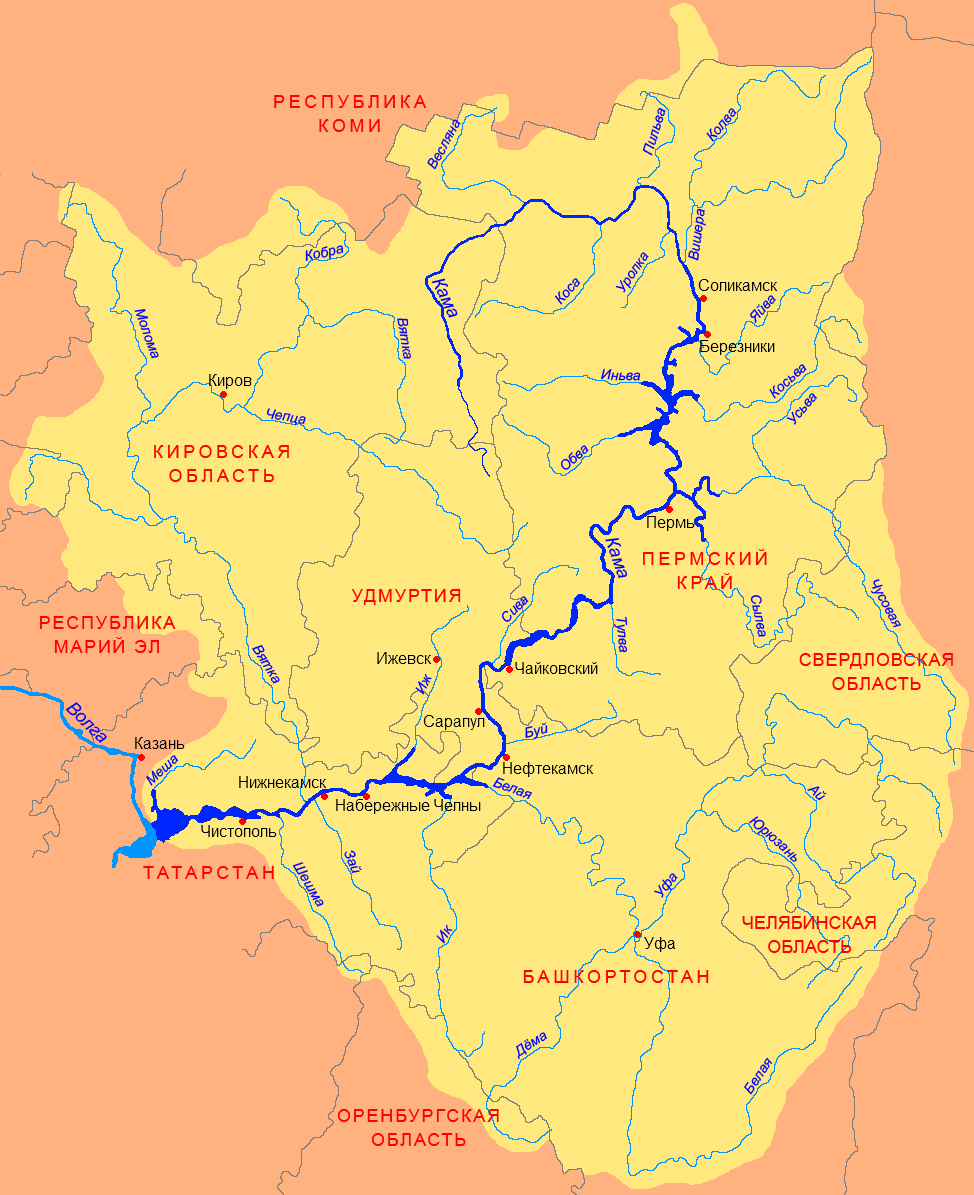
- Scheme of the Kama River Basin.

Location
- Country: Russia

Physical characteristics
- Source
  - location: Middle Ural, Uinsky District
- Mouth: Votkinsk Reservoir
  - coordinates: 57°13′09″N 55°34′36″E
- Length: 118 km (73 mi)
- Basin size: 3,530 km^{2} (1,360 sq mi)

Basin features
- Progression: Votkinsk Reservoir→ Kama→ Volga→ Caspian Sea

The Tulva (Russian: Тулва) is a river in Perm Krai, Russia, a left tributary of the Votkinsk Reservoir, which is fed and drained by the Kama. The river is 118 kilometres (73 mi) long, and its drainage basin covers 3,530 square kilometres (1,360 mi^{2}).

The river begins in the highlands in the far south of Perm Krai. Its mouth is 10 kilometres (6 mi) southeast of the town of Osa. The main tributaries are the Barda, Bolshaya Amzya, Malaya Amzya, Chiriz, Tyundyuk, Sarashka, Yermiya, and Iskilda.
