= Bardymsky District =

Bardymsky District Бардымский район (Russian)
- District
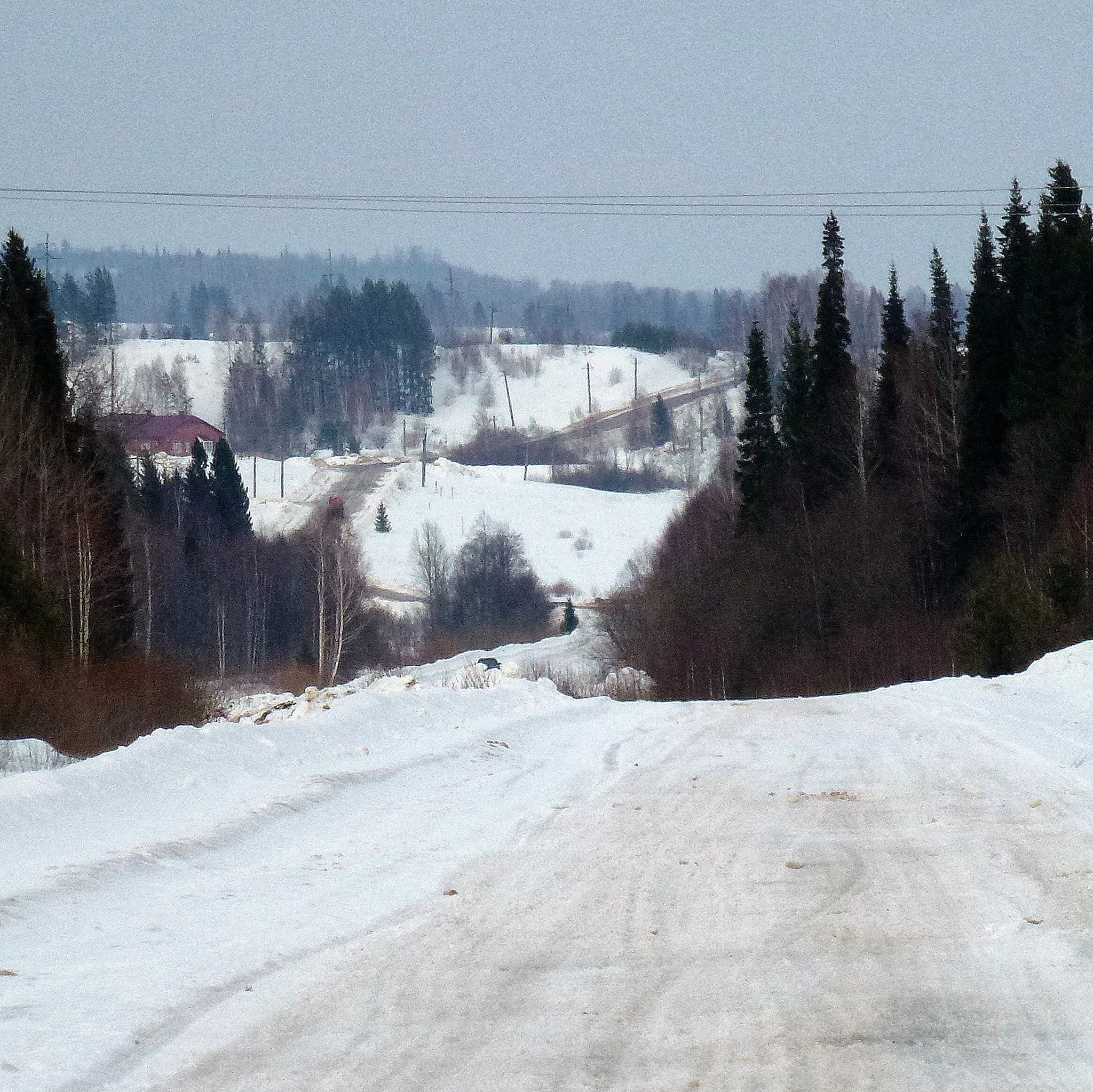
- Amirovka, Bardymsky District

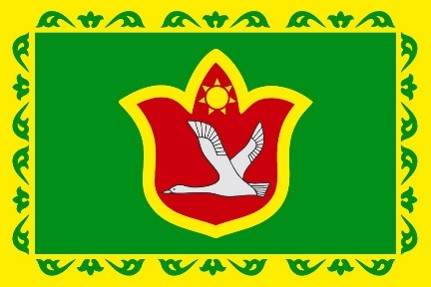
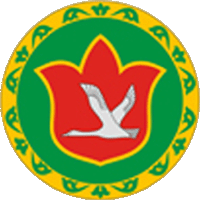
- Flag Coat of arms
- Location of Bardymsky District in Perm Krai
- Coordinates: 56.89°N 55.684°E
- Country: Russia
- Federal subject: Perm Krai
- Established: November 4, 1926 (first); January 12, 1965 (second)
- Administrative center: Barda

Area
  - Total: 2,382 km^{2} (920 sq mi)

Population (2010 Census)
  - Total: 25,538
  - Density: 10.72/km^{2} (27.77/sq mi)
  - Urban: 0%
  - Rural: 100%

Administrative structure
  - Inhabited localities: 61 rural localities

Municipal structure
  - Municipally incorporated as: Bardymsky Municipal District
  - Municipal divisions: 0 urban settlements, 12 rural settlements
- Time zone: UTC+5 (MSK+2)
- OKTMO ID: 57604000
- Website: http://barda-rayon.ru/

Bardymsky District (Russian: Барды́мский райо́н) is an administrative district (raion) of Perm Krai, Russia; one of the thirty-three in the krai. Municipally, it is incorporated as Bardymsky Municipal District. It is located in the south of the krai, in the valley of the Tulva River, and borders with Osinsky District in the north, Kungursky District in the northeast, Uinsky District in the east, Chernushinsky District in the southeast, Kuyedinsky District in the southwest, and with Yelovsky District in the west. The area of the district is 2,382 square kilometers (920 sq mi). Its administrative center is the rural locality (a selo) of Barda. Population: 25,538 (2010 census); 27,904 (2002 census); 29,584 (1989 Soviet census). The population of Barda accounts for 34.6% of the district's total population.

== Geography ==
About one half of the district's territory is covered by forests. Climate is temperate continental.

== History ==
The district was first established on November 4, 1926. In October 1938, it became a part of Perm Oblast. It was abolished between February 1, 1963 and January 12, 1965.

== Demographics ==
The population of the district is wholly rural. The most numerous ethnic groups, according to the 2002 Census, include Bashkirs at 60%, Tatars at 32.3%, and Russians at 7.2%.

== Economy ==
District's economy is based on agriculture. Logging and extraction of oil are also developed. Agricultural lands account for about 40% of the district's total territory. Annually, 15,500 tons of milk, 3,600 tons of meat, 58,300 tons of crops, and 6,800 tons of potatoes are produced in the district. There are many food processing plants in the district, as well as some oil industry and construction companies.

== Natural resources ==
There are deposits of oil in the district.

== Notable residents ==
- Nikolay Karakulov (1918–1988), Soviet sprinter
- Sharifzyan Kazanbaev (1916–1944), Tatar Red Army sergeant major, Hero of the Soviet Union

== Sources ==
- Законодательное собрание Пермской области. Закон №416-67 от 28 февраля 1996 г. «Об административно-территориальном устройстве Пермского края», в ред. Закона №504-ПК от 9 июля 2015 г. «О внесении изменений в Закон Пермской области "Об административно-территориальном устройстве Пермского края"». Вступил в силу с момента опубликования. Опубликован: "Звезда", №38, 12 марта 1996 г. (Legislative Assembly of Perm Oblast. Law #416-67 of February 28, 1996 On the Administrative-Territorial Structure of Perm Krai, as amended by the Law #504-PK of July 9, 2015 On Amending the Law of Perm Oblast "On the Administrative-Territorial Structure of Perm Krai". Effective as of the moment of publication.).
- Законодательное собрание Пермской области. Закон №1715-347 от 10 ноября 2004 г. «Об утверждении границ и о наделении статусом муниципальных образований Бардымского района Пермского края», в ред. Закона №273-ПК от 14 декабря 2013 г. «О внесении изменений в отдельные Законы Пермской области, Коми-Пермяцкого автономного округа, Пермского края». Вступил в силу через десять дней со дня официального опубликования. Опубликован: "Бюллетень Законодательного Собрания и администрации Пермской области", №12, I часть, 9 декабря 2004 г. (Legislative Assembly of Perm Oblast. Law #1715-347 of November 10, 2004 On Establishing the Borders and on Granting the Status to the Municipal Formations of Bardymsky District of Perm Krai, as amended by the Law #273-PK of December 14, 2013 On Amending Various Laws of Perm Oblast, Komi-Permyak Autonomous Okrug, Perm Krai. Effective as of the day which is ten days following the day of the official publication.).
