= Barda, Perm Krai =

Barda Барда
- Selo
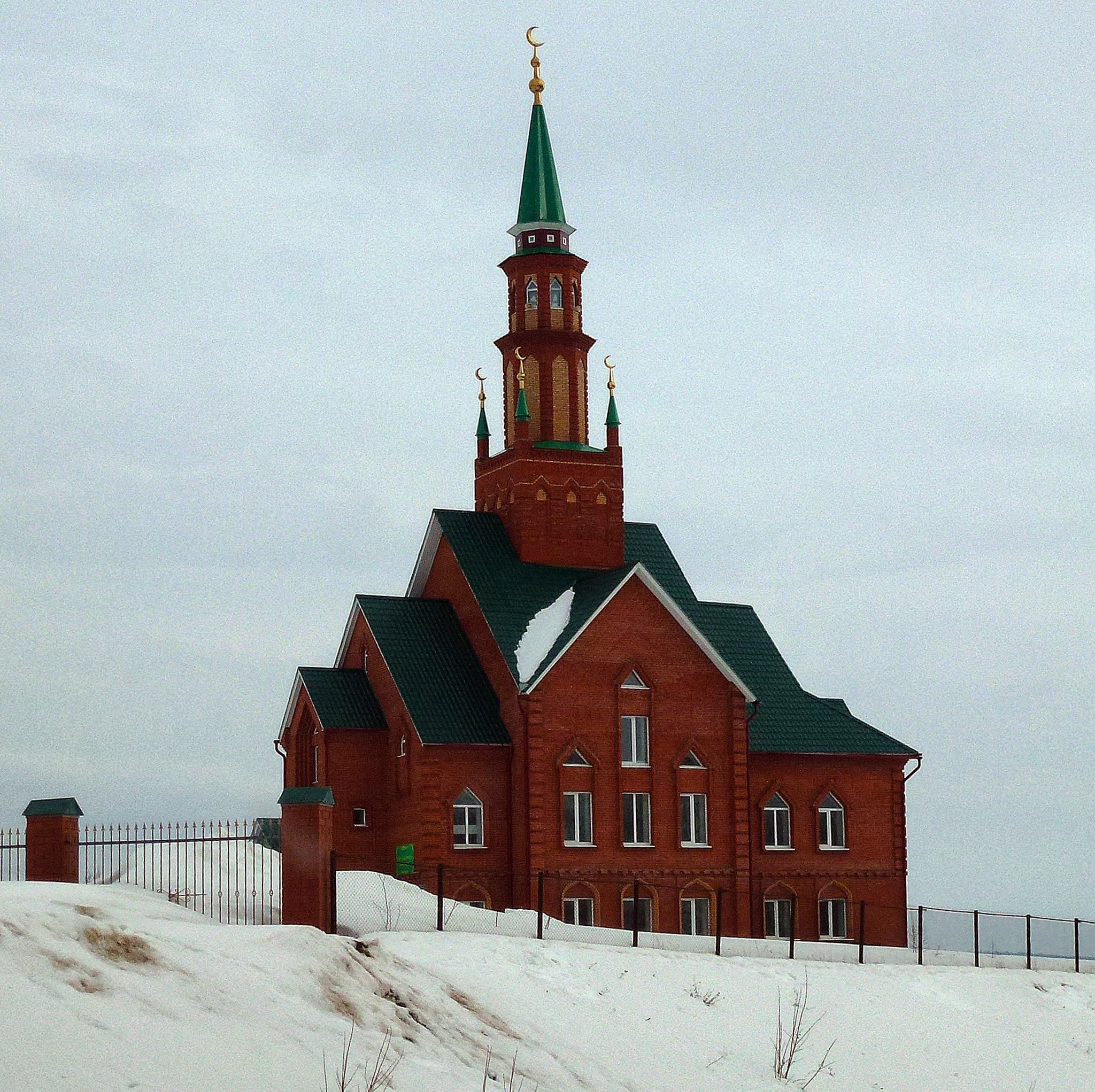

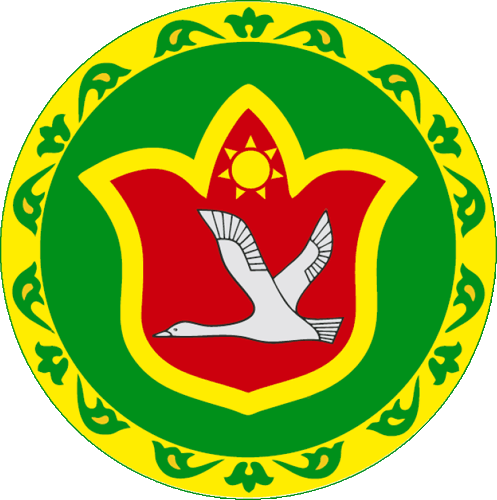
- Coat of arms
- Interactive map of Barda
- Location of Barda Barda (Perm Krai)
- Coordinates: 56°55′N 55°35′E
- Country: Russia
- Federal subject: Perm Krai
- Administrative district: Bardymsky District
- First mentioned: 1740
- Elevation: 126 m (413 ft)

Population (2010 Census)
  - Total: 8,826
  - Estimate (2021): 9,972 (+13%)

Administrative status
  - Capital of: Bardymsky District
- Time zone: UTC+5 (MSK+2)
- Postal code: 618150
- OKTMO ID: 57604407101

Barda (Russian: Барда) is a rural locality (a selo) and the administrative center of Bardymsky District of Perm Krai, Russia.

== History ==
It was first mentioned in 1740. In 1750, the first mosque was built; the first madrasa (Muslim school) was registered in 1760.

== Demographics ==
In 1834, 223 Bashkirs and tatars in 34 households lived in Barda. Presently most of the population is of Bashkir and Tatar ethnicities.
