= List of Soviet divisions 1917–1945 =

Military formations in the Soviet Union

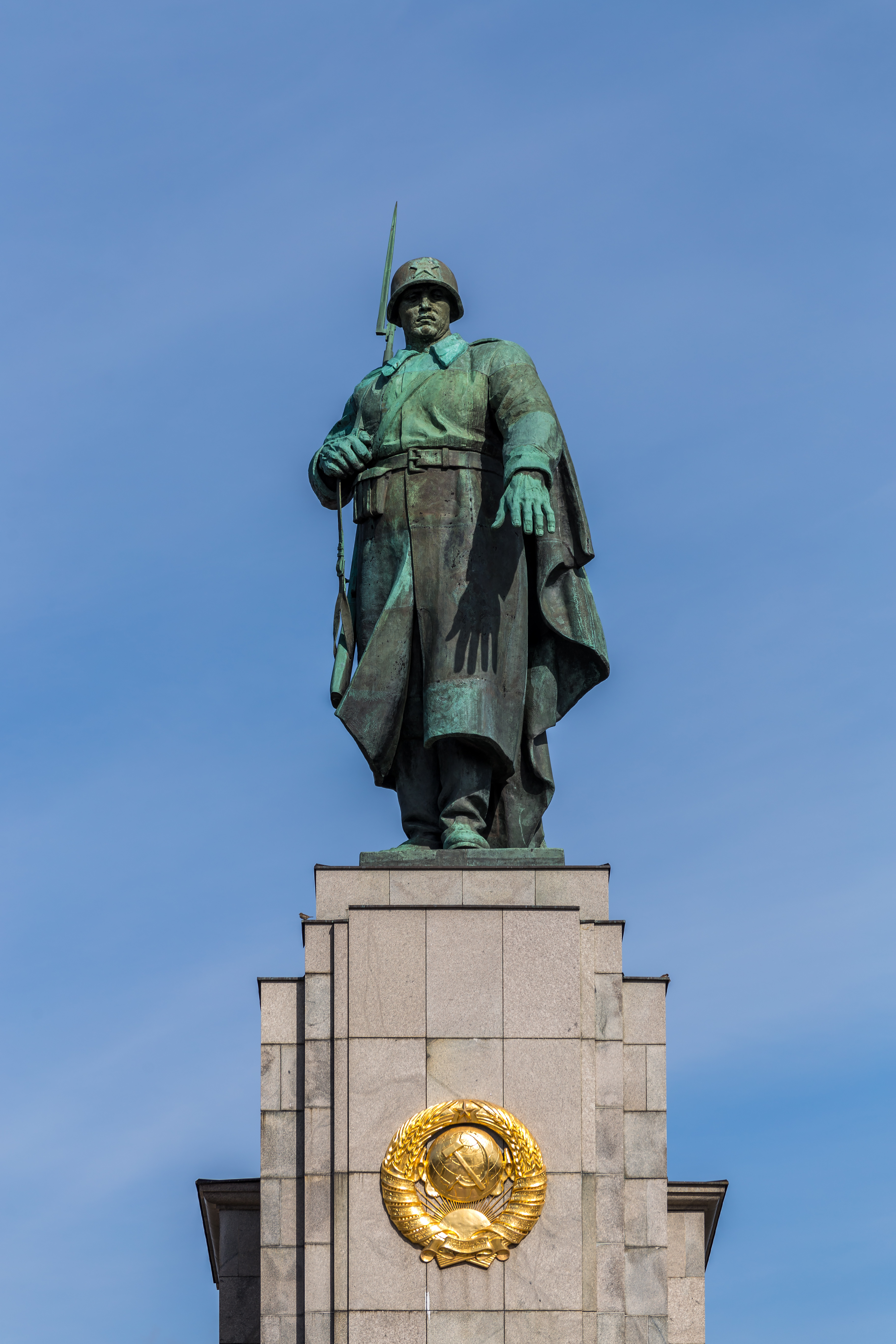
Soviet War Memorial (Tiergarten).

The Soviet Union's Red Army raised divisions during the Russian Civil War, and again during the interwar period in 1926. Only a few of the Civil War divisions were retained in this period, and even fewer survived the reorganization of the Red Army during the 1937–1941 period. During the Second World War 400 'line' rifle divisions (infantry), 129 Soviet Guards rifle divisions, and over 50 cavalry divisions as well as many divisions of combat support arms were raised in addition to the hundreds of divisions that existed in the Red Army before Operation Barbarossa. Almost all the pre-war mechanized and tank divisions were disbanded during the war. There were also Red Air Force aviation divisions, and the NKVD divisions which also took part in fighting.

The territorial principle of manning the Red Army was introduced in the mid-1920s. In each region able-bodied men were called up for a limited period of active duty in a territorial unit, which comprised about half the Army's strength, each year, for five years. The first call-up period was for three months, with one month a year thereafter. A regular cadre provided a stable nucleus. By 1925 this system provided 46 of the 77 infantry divisions and one of the eleven cavalry divisions. The remainder consisted of NCO's and enlisted personnel serving two-year stints. The territorial system was finally abolished, with all remaining formations converted to the other 'cadre' divisions, in 1937 and 1938.

The Red Army formed at least 42 "national" divisions during the Second World War which had substantial ethnic majorities in their composition derived from location of initial formation rather than intentional "nationalization" of the divisions, including four Azeri, five Armenian, and eight Georgian rifle divisions and a large number of cavalry divisions in the eastern Ukraine, Kuban region, and Central Asia, including five Uzbek cavalry divisions.

== Airborne Divisions ==
- 1st Guards Airborne Division (ex 4th Airborne Corps at Tejkovo December 1942). Fought at Vyazma, Demyansk, Staraya Russa, Kremenchug, near Krivoi Rog, Budapest, Brno, and in Manchuria. With 53rd Army of the 2nd Ukrainian Front May 1945. Became 124th Guards Rifle Division in December 1945 while with 18th Guards Rifle Corps, Eastern Siberian Military District.
- 2nd Guards Airborne Division – established at Zvenigorod December 1942. Fought at Ponyri, Kursk, Korsun, and in the Carpathians. With 1st Guards Army of the 4th Ukrainian Front 5.45. Disbanded, after temporary loss of its divisional colours, soon after war ended.
- 3rd Guards Airborne Division (ex 8th Airborne Corps at Shchelkovo December 1942). Fought at Demyansk, Ponyri, Kiev, Zhitomir, Debrecen, Budapest, and Vienna. With 27th Army of the 3rd Ukrainian Front 5.45. Became 125th Guards Rifle Division December 1945.
- 4th Guards Airborne Division (ex 1st Airborne Corps at Moscow December 1942). Fought at Kursk, Orel, Zhitomir, Korsun, Targul Frumos, Debrecen, Budapest, Bratislava and Prague. With 7th Guards Army of the 2nd Ukrainian Front 5.45. Became 111th Guards Rifle Division 28 June 1945 while with 25th Guards Rifle Corps, 7th Guards Army.
- 5th Guards Airborne Division – established at Kirshatsch December 1942. Fought at Demyansk, Voronezh, Korsun, on the Dniester River, and at Budapest. With 4th Guards Army of the 3rd Ukrainian Front 5.45. Became 112th Guards Rifle Division 28 June 1945 while serving with 20th Guards Rifle Corps, 4th Guards Army.
- 6th Guards Airborne Division (ex 6th Airborne Corps at Noginsk December 1942). Fought at Staraya Russa, Kursk, on the Dnieper River, and at Korsun, Targul Frumos, Debrecen, Budapest, Bratislava, and Prague. With Seventh Guards Army of the 2nd Ukrainian Front May 1945. Became 113th Guards Rifle Division 28 June 1945.
- 7th Guards Airborne Division – established at Ramenskoye December 1942. Fought at Demyansk, Voronezh, Korsun, on the Dnieper River, and at Targul Frumos and Budapest. With 4th Guards Army of the 3rd Ukrainian Front 5.45. The first formation of the 7th Guards Airborne Division was retitled as the 115th Guards Rifle Division. The 115th Guards Division was disbanded in 1953 in Kiev.
- 8th Guards Airborne Division – established in the Moscow Military District December 1942. Fought at Demyansk, Voronezh, Kirovograd, Targul Frumos, near Budapest, Vienna, and Prague. Became 107th Guards Rifle Division 12.44.
- 9th Guards Airborne Division (ex 1st Airborne Corps in Moscow MD December 1942). Fought at Demyansk, Staraya Russa, Kursk, Poltava, Kremenchug, Kirovograd, Sandomir, and in the Berlin Operation. with 5th Guards Army of the 1st Ukrainian Front 5.45. Became the 116th Guards Rifle Division, June 1945.
- 10th Guards Airborne Division – established at Dimitrov December 1942. Fought at Demyansk, on the Dniester River, and in Hungary. With the 57th Army of the 3rd Ukrainian Front 5.45. Became 126th Guards Rifle Division, December 1945.
- 11th Guards Airborne Division – became the 104th Guards Rifle Division December 1944.
- 12th Guards Airborne Division – became the 105th Guards Rifle Division December 1944.
- 13th Guards Airborne Division – became the 103rd Guards Rifle Division December 1944.
- 14th Guards Airborne Division – became 99th Guards Rifle Division Jan 1944, reformed September 1944, 2nd formation became 114th Guards Rifle Division
- 15th Guards Airborne Division – became the 100th Guards Rifle Division January 1944.
- 16th Guards Airborne Division – became the 106th Guards Rifle Division December 1944. Now 106th Guards Airborne Division of the Russian Airborne Troops.

At the end of the Second World War most of the remaining Guards Airborne Divisions were redesignated Guards Rifle Divisions. At the end of June 1945 this has happened to the 4th, 5th, 6th, 7th, and 9th, which became respectively the 111, 112, 113, 115, and 116th Guards Rifle Divisions. In November, it happened to the 1st, 3rd, and 10th Airborne Divisions, which became the 124th, 125th, and 126th Guards Rifle Divisions.

- 7th Guards Cherkassy Airborne Division (Kaunas, Lithuanian SSR)
- 21st Guards Airborne Division (Valga, Karelian ASSR)
- 31st Guards Airborne Division (Zviahel, Ukrainian SSR)
- 76th Guards Chernigov Airborne Division (Pskov, RSFSR)
- 98th Guards Svir Airborne Division (Bolgrad & Chișinău, Moldovan SSR)
- 103rd Guards Airborne Division (Vitebsk, Belorussian SSR)
- 104th Guards Airborne Division (Kirovabad, Azerbaijan SSR)
- 106th Guards Tula Airborne Division (Tula, RSFSR)
- 114th Guards Airborne Division (Borovukha, Belorussian SSR)
- 242nd District Training Centre of the Airborne Forces (Gaižiūnai/Jonava, Lithuanian SSR) created from the 44th Training Airborne Division, 1987.

== NKVD Divisions ==
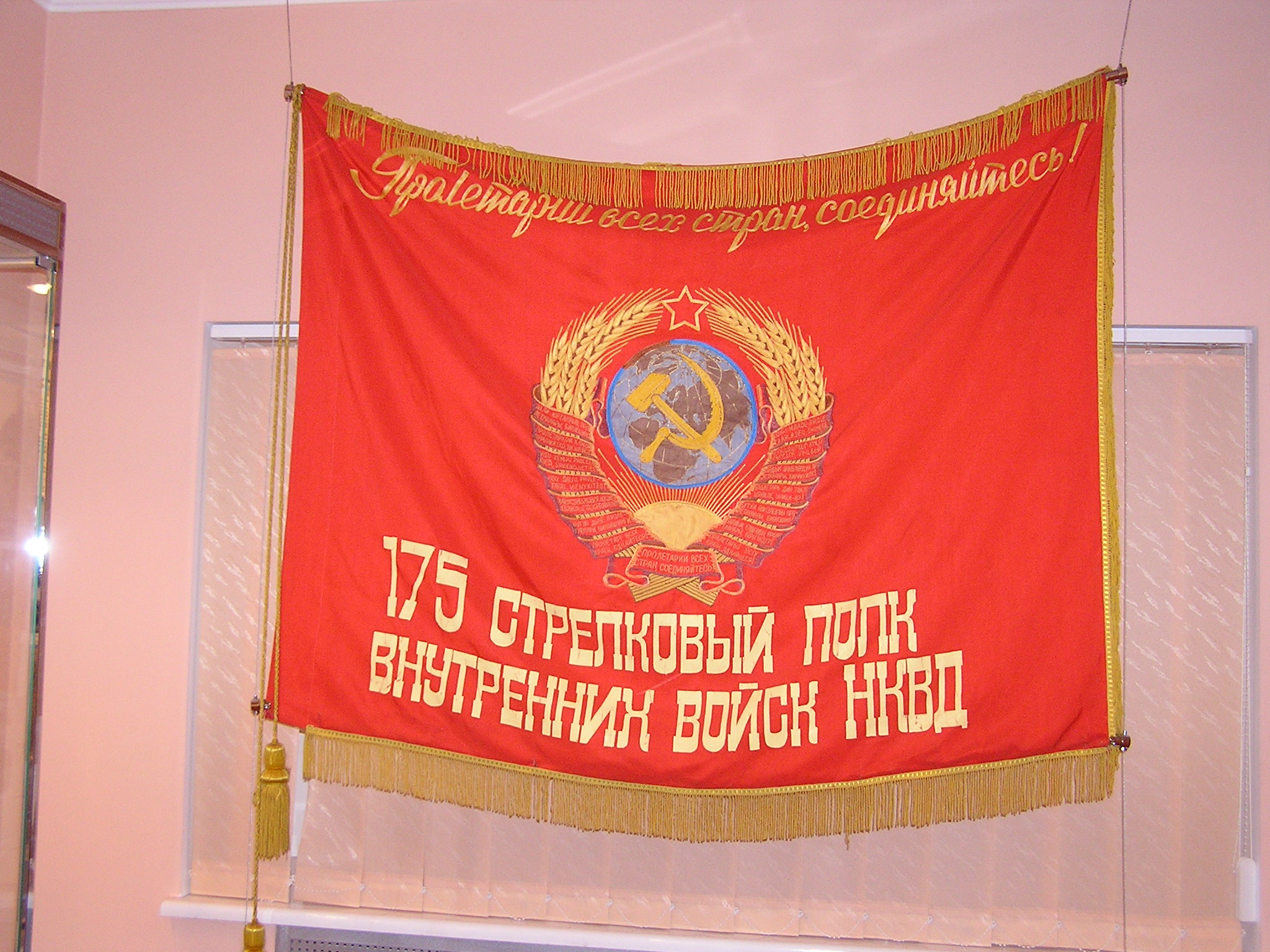
Banner of the 175th Rifle Regiment, Internal Troops, NKVD

Not intended for front line combat, NKVD Internal Troops were used to guard borders, secure railways, and combat elements such as the Ukrainian Insurgent Army that posed threats to the rear areas and supply convoys of the Red Army. Notwithstanding the original intent of these units, many saw at least some front line combat, several were converted to regular divisions of the Red Army, and others were grouped into a field NKVD army that was later re-numbered as the 70th Army.

There were different types of divisions: Rifle Division (abbreviated to RD in this list), Railroad Security Division (RSD), Special Installation Security Division (SISD), and Convoy Forces Security Division (CFSD).

This list is primarily drawn from David Glantz, Companion To Colossus Reborn: Key Documents And Statistics, University Press of Kansas, 2005.

=== NKVD Rifle Divisions ===
NKVD Rifle Divisions (RD)
Unit	Established on	Established at	With the [...] Front	Further fate	Disbanded on
1st	Sept. 1941	Mga	Northwestern and Leningrad	Became 46th RD (3rd formation) on 9 August 1942	
3rd	Jan. 1942	Leningrad			August 1942
3rd	Sept. 1942	Tbilisi (as the Tbilisi Division)	Transcaucasus	Renamed as 3rd NKVD RD in June 1944. In 1945, it was with 2nd Far Eastern Front in Manchuria	1946
4th	Sept. 1941	Crimea	51st Army and the Separate Coastal Army	Became 184th RD (2nd) in October 1941	
4th	10 Oct. 1943	Moscow		In the Baltics	12 Aug. 1951
5th	11 Jan. 1942	Tikhvin		In Leningrad region and Baltics	15 Sept. 1951
6th	Jan. 1942	Kalinin	Kalinin and 2nd Baltic	Later in the Belorussian Military District	Oct. 1945
9th	22 Aug. 1942	Ordzhonikidze (as Ordzhonikidze NKVD RD)	Transcaucasus during latter part of 1942	Became the 9th NKVD RD in Krasnodar in May 1944.	Oct. 1944
10th	July 1942	Saratov and Stalingrad	Stalingrad	Became the 181st RD (3rd) in October 1942. Assigned to the 70th (NKVD) Army.	
10th	26 March 1942	Rostov (as the 41st NKVD RSD)		Renamed at Sukhumi as Sukhumi NKVD RD in September 1942. With 46th Army of the Transcaucasian Front. Became the 10th NKVD RD at Sarny in April 1944. With Central, Belorussian, and 1st Belorussian Fronts, and then in the Belorussian Military District.	June 1946
11th	Jan. 1942	Nalchik and Krasnodar	Crimean and Transcaucasus		December 1942
12th	Jan. 1942	Moscow		Became the 22nd NKVD Rifle Brigade in September 1942	
19th	August 1942	Grozny	Transcaucasus	Fought at Grozny	
20th	5 Sept. 1941	Tikhvin (from the 20th NKVD SIRSD)	8th and 23rd Armies	Became the 92nd RD in August 1942.	
57th	18 Jan. 1945	Gaižiūnai	3rd Belorussian		Oct. 1945
58th	Jan. 1945		1st Belorussian		June 1945
59th	Jan. 1945	Lviv	1st Ukrainian		Oct. 1945
60th	22 Feb. 1945	Vinnytsia	2nd Ukrainian		4 Oct. 1946
61st	Feb. 1945	Bălți	the Ukrainian fronts		Dec. 1945
62nd	Dec. 1944	Belgrade	3rd Ukrainian		Sept. 1951
63rd	Jan. 1945	Białystok	2nd Belorussian		Dec. 1946
64th	Oct. 1944	Lublin (as the NKVD Composite Division)	1st Ukrainian	Became the 64th NKVD RD at Lviv in December 1944	June 1948
65th	23 Jan. 1945	Stanislav	2nd and 3rd Ukrainian (in Hungary)		18 July 1946
66th	Jan. 1945	Sibiu	3rd Ukrainian (in Romania)		Oct. 1945
Grozny	15 Aug. 1942	Grozny	Transcaucasus until December 1942	Participated in the repressions of the 1940–1944 insurgency in Chechnya	18 April 1944
Makhachkala	Aug. 1942	Makhachkala		Fought with Red Army until November 1942	Jan. 1943
Siberian	Oct. 1942	Siberia		Became the 140th RD in January 1943. Assigned to the 70th (NKVD) Army.	
Central Asian	Oct. 1942	Siberia		Became the 161st RD in January 1943. Assigned to the 70th (NKVD) Army.	
Far Eastern	Oct. 942	Siberia		Became the 102nd RD in January 1943. Assigned to the 70th (NKVD) Army.	
Trans-Baikal	Oct. 1942	Siberia		Became the 106th RD in January 1943. Assigned to the 70th (NKVD) Army.	
Ural	Oct. 1942	Siberia		Became the 175th RD in January 1943. Assigned to the 70th (NKVD) Army.	

=== NKVD Motor Rifle Divisions ===
NKVD Motor Rifle Divisions
Unit	Established on	Established at	With	Further fate	Disbanded on
1st	23 June 1938	Moscow (as the Separate NKVD Motorized RD)	Western Front and 56th Army	Still exists in the Russian MVD Internal troops	
2nd	July 1941	Moscow		In Leningrad region and the Baltics	October 1945
4th	January 1942	Leningrad			August 1942
6th	November 1941	behind Southwestern Front		Became the 8th Motor RD NKVD on 11 February 1942	
7th	April 1942	Orel and Tula	Western, Bryansk, Central, Belorussian, and 1st Belorussian Fronts	Later in the Belorussian Military District	13 September 1951
8th	Formed Jan 1942	Voronezh (from the 6th NKVD Motor RD)		Became the 63rd RD in July 1942, and then the 52nd Guards RD in November 1943	
8th	January 1942	Voronezh (? see above)		Renumbered as the 13th NKVD Motor RD in July 1942	
9th	January 1942	Rostov		Became the 31st RD in August 1942	
13th	May 1942	Moscow (from elements of the 8th NKVD Motor RD)	Voronezh Front	Became the 95th RD (2nd) in August 1942	
21st	June 1941	Leningrad	42nd Army	Became the 21st NKVD RD on 1 September 1941, then became the 109th RD in August 1942	
22nd	23 June 1941	Northwestern Front		After 30 June 1941, it operated as a part of 10th Rifle Corps, but it had no organic artillery, engineer, or logistical support	Wiped out in August 1941. Disbanded in January 1942.
23rd	June 1941	Kiev Special Military District	Southwestern Front	Became the 8th NKVD Motor RD in January 1941	

=== NKVD Railroad Security Divisions ===
NKVD RSD
Unit	Established on	Established at	With the	Further fate	Disbanded on
2nd	8 March 1939	Leningrad	Leningrad and Special Baltic Military Districts	Became 23rd NKVD RSD on 11 Feb. 1942	
3rd	8 March 1939	Mogilev	Wiped out twice in 1941, with the Western and Bryansk Fronts	Became the 24th NKVD RSD on 11 Feb. 1942	
4th	8 March 1939	Kiev	In June 1941 in the Odessa Military District and later with Southern Front	Became the 25th NKVD RSD on 11 Feb. 1942	
5th	8 March 1939	Kharkov	Southwestern Front	Became the 26th NKVD RSD on 11 Feb. 1942	
6th	8 March 1939	Khabarovsk	In the Far East	Became the 27th NKVD RSD on 11 Feb. 1942	
7th	8 March 1939	Svobodnyi		Became the 28th NKVD RSD on 11 Feb. 1942	
8th	8 March 1939	Chita		Became the 29th NKVD RSD on 11 Feb. 1942	
9th		Vilnius	Special Baltic and Western Special Military Districts	Wiped out in 1941	25 Sept. 1941
10th	14 Nov. 1939	Lviv	Southwestern Front	Wiped out at Kiev	Oct. 1941
14th	3 Aug. 1944	Vilnius			15 May 1951
18th	24 June 1941	Tbilisi		Became the 30th NKVD RSD on 11 Feb. 1942	
19th	24 June 1941	Gorki		Became the 31st NKVD SIRSD on 26 March 1942	
20th	24 June 1941	Leningrad		Became the 20th NKVD RD on 5 Sept. 1941	
22nd	29 Feb. 1944	Kuibyshev			25 May 1946
23rd	11 Feb. 1942	Leningrad		Fought in the Leningrad area.	15 May 1951
24th	11 Feb. 1942	Moscow		Previously was the 3rd NKVD RSD	21 Dec. 1946
25th	11 Feb. 1942	Saratov	Southwestern and 2nd and 3rd Ukrainian Fronts	Previously was the 4th NKVD RSD	15 May 1951
26th	11 Feb. 1942	Liski		Previously was the 5th NKVD RSD	21 Dec. 1946
27th	11 Feb. 1942	Khabarovsk		Previously was the 6th NKVD RSD	15 May 1951
28th	11 Feb. 1942	Svobodnyi		Previously was the 7th NKVD RSD. Became the 32nd NKVD RS Brigade on 29 Feb. 1944	
29th	11 Feb. 1942	Chita		Previously was the 8th NKVD RSD	21 Dec. 1946
30th	11 Feb. 1942	Tbilisi		Previously was the 18th NKVD RSD	16 Dec. 1946
31st	26 Mar. 1942	Gorki		Previously was the 19th NKVD RSD	25 May 1946
32nd	26 Mar. 1942	Voroshilov	With Voronezh, Central, Belorussian, and 1st Ukrainian Fronts		15 May 1951
33rd	26 Mar. 1942	Kuibyshev			8 Jan. 1947
34th	26 Mar. 1942	Sverdlovsk			21 Dec. 1946
41st	26 Mar. 1942	Rostov		Successively renamed the Sukhumi Division and the 10th NKVD RD	

=== NKVD Mountain Rifle Divisions ===
NKVD Mountain Rifle Divisions
Unit	Established on	Established at	With the	Further fate
12th	29 June 1941	Saratov		July 1941 became the 268th RD
15th	29 June 1941	Moscow	With Southern Front	July 1941 became the 257th RD
16th	29 June 1941	Moscow		July 1941 became the 262nd RD
26th	29 June 1941	Moscow		July 1941 assigned to Red Army

=== NKVD Special Installation Security Division ===
NKVD SISD
Unit	Established on	Established at	With the	Further fate	Disbanded on
11th	6 Nov. 1939	Moscow		Merged with 12th to become 15th on 31 Jan. 1942	
12th	25 Aug. 1941	Moscow		Merged with 11th to become 15th on 31 Jan. 1942	
15th	31 Jan. 1942	Moscow		Formed by merger of 11th and 12th	15 May 1951
16th	31 Jan. 1942	Moscow			30 May 1950
17th	31 Jan. 1942	Gorki			15 May 1951
18th	22 June 1941	Sverdlovsk (as the 25th)		Became the 18th on 31 Jan. 1942	15 May 1951
19th	31 Jan. 1942	Vorishilovgrad	Southern and Trans-Caucasus Fronts	Became the 8th NKVD Brigade on 10 Nov. 1942	
20th	10 Nov. 1942	Novosibirsk and Kuibyshev			15 May 1951
21st	28 July 1943	Novosibirsk		Became the 54th NKVD Brigade on 22 Nov. 1945	
25th	22 June 1941	Sverdlovsk		Became the 18th on 31 Jan. 1942	

=== NKVD Convoy Forces Security Division ===
NKVD CFSD
Unit	Formed on	Established at	With the	Further fate	Disbanded on
13th	Nov. 1939	Kiev	Southern and Southwestern Fronts until wiped out in Sept. 1941	Remnants became the 35th on Feb. 1942	
14th	Sep. 1940	Moscow		Became the 36th on Feb. 1942	
35th	Feb. 1942	Voronezh (was the 13th)	Stalingrad and Central Asian Military Districts		July 1951
36th	Feb. 1942	Krasnoiarsk (was the 14th)	Ukrainian Military District		Jan. 1948
37th	March 1942	Volodarsk	Western and 1st Belorussian Fronts		July 1951
38th	March 1942	Novosibirsk			July 1951
39th	Aug. 1943	Sverdlovsk			July 1951
45th	Aug. 1944	Beltsy	2nd Ukrainian Front		Sept. 1955
46th	Aug. 1944	Moscow			Sept. 1955
47th	May 1945	Leningrad			
48th	May 1945	Riga			
49th	May 1945	Odessa			
50th	May 1945	Voronezh			
51st	May 1945	Kharkov			
52nd	May 1945	Voroshilovgrad			
53rd	May 1945	Rostov			
56th	May 1945	Alma-Ata			

== Cavalry Divisions ==
Cavalry divisions in the Red Army were first formed in the early days of the Russian Civil War. The Red cavalry played a key role in the war, as the relatively small size of the forces involved and the large open spaces were ideal for mobile cavalry operations. 27 cavalry divisions were formed during the war, of which all but eleven were disbanded after the end of the war in 1921. The Red Army's cavalry forces was gradually expanded during the interwar period, reaching a peak in 1936, when the Red Army included 36 cavalry divisions. However, the increasing demand for mechanized units resulted in drastic reductions in the Red Army cavalry force during the last few years before the German invasion of the Soviet Union in June 1941.

At the time of the German invasion, there were nine regular cavalry divisions and four mountain cavalry divisions in the Red Army. The rapid destruction of Soviet mechanized forces in the summer and autumn of 1941 resulted in a rapid expansion of cavalry units to provide the Red Army a mobile, if not armored, force. This expansion produced some 87 new cavalry divisions by early 1942, many of which were later disbanded as the Red Army rebuilt its tank and mechanized formations. 17 of the cavalry divisions were granted Guards status and renumbered accordingly. At the start of the conflict, a cavalry division had some 9,000 men; by 1945, they were authorized 6,000 men and often organized into corps of three divisions that were reinforced by artillery, tank, and assault gun elements.

After the end of World War II, the remaining 26 cavalry divisions were mostly converted into mechanized and tank units or disbanded. The last cavalry divisions were not disbanded until the early 1950s, with the last cavalry division, the 4th Guards Cavalry Division (II Formation, previously reduced in status from 4th Guards Cavalry Corps), being disbanded in April 1955.

- 1st Cavalry Division (1st RSFSR (pre-Soviet Union) formation) — Formed 28.12.1920 from the Moscow Cavalry Division. Fought in the Russian Civil War. Converted into a cavalry brigade of the 12th Cavalry Division 31 December 1920.
- 1st Cavalry Division (2nd RSFSR formation, 1st USSR formation) — Renumbered 6 May 1922 from 8th Cavalry Division. Redesignated 32nd Cavalry Division May 1938.
- 1st Mountain Cavalry Division (1st RSFSR formation) — Formed Jan 1920 from the 1st Altai Mountain Rifle Division. Fought in the Russian Civil War. Disbanded 29 March 1920 and remainder absorbed by the 26th Rifle Division.
- 1st Mountain Cavalry Division (1st USSR formation) — Formed in July 1941. With Trans-Caucasus Front December 1941 and 15th Cavalry Corps July 1944. Stationed in Iran during World War II.
- 2nd Cavalry Division – used to create the third formation of the 2nd Rifle Division on 23.11.41.
- 3rd Cavalry Division – Formed in Odessa Military District prewar. 6.41 with 5th Cavalry Corps. Became the 5th Guards Cavalry Division 22.12.41. Originally 34,60,99,158 Cavalry Regiments and 44th Tank Regiment.
- 4th Cavalry Division – 6.41 with 9th Cavalry Corps. Reformed by reorganisation of 210th Motorised Division later in 1941.
- 5th Cavalry Division— (ex 2nd Cavalry Division 8.24). With 2nd Cavalry Corps, 9th Army in 6.41. Became 1st Guards Cavalry Division 26.11.41. Originally 11,96,131,160 Cavalry Regiments and 32nd Tank Regiment
- 6th Cavalry Division – with 6th Cavalry Corps in 6.41. Disbanded 19.9.41. Originally 3,48,94,152 Cavalry Regiments and 35th Tank Regiment.
- 7th Cavalry Division – with 3rd Cavalry Corps in 5.37.
- 8th Cavalry Division – 6.41 with 1st Red Banner Army in Far East. Originally 49,115,121,163 Cavalry Regiments. With 6th Guards Cavalry Corps of the 2nd Ukrainian Front 5.45.
- 9th Cavalry Division – formed in Odessa Military District prewar, with 2nd Cavalry Corps, 9th Army 6.41. Originally 5,72,108,136 Cavalry Regiments and 30th Tank Regiment. 11.41 became 2nd Guards Cavalry Division. Reformed, with 4th Guards Cavalry Corps of the 2nd Ukrainian Front 5.45.
- 10th Cavalry Division – formed 23.4.36. 4.42 remnants merged into 12th and 13th Cavalry Divisions.
- 11th Cavalry Division – with 3rd Cavalry Corps 5.37. 1.43 became 8th Guards Cavalry Division.
- 12th Cavalry Division – 1.42 established at Krasnodar; with 17th Cavalry Corps 4.42. Became 9th Guards Cavalry Division on 27.8.42.
- 13th Cavalry Division – established at Krasnodar 1.42; with 17th Cavalry Corps 4.42. Became 10th Guards Cavalry Division 27.8.42.
- 14th Cavalry Division – 6.41 with 5th Cavalry Corps. Became 6th Guards Cavalry Division 12.41.
- 15th Cavalry Division – 4.42 with 17th Cavalry Corps. 8.42 became 11th Guards Cavalry Division.
- 17th Mountain Cavalry Division – 6.41 with Transcaucasus Military District. 7.42 disbanded.
- 18th Cavalry Division - Operated under Dmitri Zhloba during the Red Army invasion of Georgia 2.21. With 4th Cavalry Corps, Central Asia Military District 6.41. 7.42 disbanded.
- 19th Cavalry Division - Uzbek national formation
- 20th Tajik Red Banner Order of Lenin Mountain Cavalry Division – 6.41 with 4th Cavalry Corps, Central Asia Military District. 8.43 became the 17th Guards Cavalry Division. Also had honour title 'mining'?
- 21st Fergana Mountain Cavalry Division – 6.41 with 4th Cavalry Corps, Central Asia Military District. Became 14th Guards Cavalry Division 14.2.43.
- 23rd Cavalry Division – with Transcaucasus Front 12.41 and 15th Cavalry Corps 7.44.
- 24th Cavalry Division – June 1941 with Transcaucasus Military District.
- 25th Cavalry Division – 6.41 with 1st Mechanized Corps.
- 26th Cavalry Division – 12.41 with 6th Cavalry Corps.
- 27th Cavalry Division – 12.41 with 4th Army.
- 28th Cavalry Division – 12.41 with 6th Cavalry Corps.
- 29th Cavalry Division – 12.41 with 3rd Army. 3.42 disbanded.
- 30th Cavalry Division – 6.41 with 1st Mechanized Corps, and with 4th Guards Cavalry Corps, 1 Guards Cavalry-Mechanized Group of the 2nd Ukrainian Front May 1945. Becomes 11 Mechanized Division 07.1945.
- 31st Cavalry Division – Formed in 1936 in the Far East. 75th Cavalry Regt was transferred from the 15 Cavalry Division ZabVO, 79 Cavalry Regiment – the mountain of 6 Cavalry Division Savo, 84 Cavalry Regiment – of 8 mountain cavalry division CAMD. 121 cavalry regiment formed in the Siberian Military District, 31 Mechanized Regiment – in Kharkiv. July 41 established at Voronezh; 12.41 with 50th Army. 5.1.42 Became 7th Guards Cavalry Division.
- 32nd Cavalry Division – Prewar division. Assigned to 9th Rifle Corps in the Crimea on 22 June 1941.
- 34th Cavalry Division – 12.41 with 6th Army.
- 35th Cavalry Division – 12.41 with 37th Army.
- 36th Cavalry Division – 6.41 with 6th Cavalry Corps under Gen. Maj. Efim Sergeevich Zybin. Disbanded 19.9.41.
- 38th Cavalry Division – 12.41 with 18th Army.
- 40th Cavalry Division – 12.41 with Separate Coastal Army.
- 41st Light Cavalry Division – 12.41 with 50th Army. Disbanded in March 1942 due to losses. Personnel used to fill out other units of the 1st Guards Cavalry Corps.
- 43rd Cavalry Division – 12.41 with Southwestern Front.
- 44th Cavalry Division – 6.41 with 9th Cavalry Corps. Noted as mountain cavalry division 12.41 while assigned to 16th Army. 4.42 merged into 17th Cavalry Division.
- 46th Cavalry Division – 12.41 with 30th Army.
- 47th Cavalry Division – Formed Jul 41. Disbanded due to heavy losses in Nov 41, troops used as replacements for 32nd Cavalry Division.
- 49th Cavalry Division – 12.41 with 6th Cavalry Corps.
- 50th Cavalry Division – 6.41 – 7.41 formed in North Caucasus Military District. With 3rd Cavalry Corps 11.41. Became 3rd Guards Cavalry Division 11.41.
- 51st Cavalry Division – 12.41 with 36th Army of Transbaikal Front.
- 52nd Cavalry Division – 12.41 with 3rd Army.
- 53rd Cavalry Division – 6.41 – 7.41 formed in North Caucasus Military District. With 3rd Cavalry Corps 11.41. Became 4th Guards Cavalry Division 11.41.
- 54th Cavalry Division – 12.41 with Kalinin Front.
- 55th Cavalry Division – 12.41 with 13th Army. 14.2.43 became 15th Guards Cavalry Division.
- 56th Cavalry Division – 12.41 with 37th Army.
- 57th Light Cavalry Division – Formed Aug 41 – Oct 41. Dec 41 with 10th Army. Disbanded in Feb 42 due to losses. Personnel used to fill out other units of the 1st Guards Cavalry Division of the 1st Guards Cavalry Corps.
- 59th Cavalry Division – 5.45 with the Transbaikal Front.
- 60th Cavalry Division – 12.41 with 57th Army.
- 61st Cavalry Division – 12.41 with 4th Cavalry Corps.
- 62nd Cavalry Division – 12.41 with 56th Army.
- 63rd Cavalry Division – 12.41 with 4th Cavalry Corps and 5.45 with the 5th Guards Cavalry Corps of the 3rd Ukrainian Front. Eventually became 6th Guards Tank Division postwar, and today the 6th Mechanised Brigade of the Armed Forces of Belarus.
- 64th Cavalry Division – 12.41 with 56th Army.
- 66th Cavalry Division – 12.41 with 9th Army.
- 68th Cavalry Division – 12.41 with 9th Army.
- 70th Cavalry Division – 12.41 with 56th Army.
- 72nd Cavalry Division – 6.41 with 2nd Cavalry Corps.
- 73rd Cavalry Division – 12.41 with 26th Army.
- 74th Cavalry Division – 12.41 with 26th Army.
- 75th Light Cavalry Division – 12.41 with 10th Army. Disbanded in March 1942 due to losses. Personnel used to fill out other units of the 1st Guards Cavalry Division of the 1st Guards Cavalry corps.
- 76th Cavalry Division – 12.41 with 39th Army.
- 77th Cavalry Division – 12.41 with 57th Army.
- 78th Cavalry Division – Formed in Troitsk August–November 1941. 12.41 with 59th Army. Disbanded April 1942.
- 79th Cavalry Division – 12.41 with 57th Army.
- 80th Cavalry Division – 12.41 with Reserve of the Supreme High Command (RVGK).
- 81st Cavalry Division – 12.41 with 4th Cavalry Corps.
- 82nd Cavalry Division – 1.42 with 11th Cavalry Corps.
- 83rd Mountain Cavalry Division – 12.41 with 61st Army. 1.43 became 13th Guards Cavalry Division.
- 84th Cavalry Division – May 1945 with the 1st Red Banner Army of the independent coastal group in the Far East.
- 87th Cavalry Division – 12.41 with 59th Army. Transferred to 2nd Shock Army and fought in the Lyuban Offensive Operation. Suffered heavy losses in the pocket and remnants absorbed into the 327th Rifle Division July 1942.
- 91st Cavalry Division – 12.41 with 61st Army.
- 94th Cavalry Division – 12.41 with 39th Army.
- 97th Cavalry Division – 12.41 with Central Asian Military District. Turkmen national formation. 4.43 disbanded.
- 98th Cavalry Division – 12.41 with Central Asian Military District. Turkmen national formation. 4.42 disbanded.
- 99th Cavalry Division – 12.41 with Central Asian Military District. Uzbek national formation. 7.42 disbanded.
- 100th Cavalry Division – 12.41 with Central Asian Military District. Uzbek national formation. Disbanded July 1942.
- 101st Cavalry Division – 12.41 with Central Asian Military District. Uzbek national formation. 7.42 disbanded.
- 102nd Cavalry Division – 12.41 with Central Asian Military District. Uzbek national formation. 6.42 disbanded.
- 103rd Cavalry Division – 12.41 with Central Asian Military District. Uzbek national formation. 3.42 disbanded.
- 104th Cavalry Division – 12.41 with Central Asian Military District. Tajik national formation. 7.42 disbanded.
- 105th Cavalry Division – 12.41 with Central Asian Military District. 7.42 disbanded.
- 106th Cavalry Division – 12.41 with Central Asian Military District. 3.42 disbanded.
- 107th Cavalry Division – 12.41 with Central Asian Military District. Kyrgyz SSR national formation. 8.42 disbanded.
- 108th Cavalry Division – 12.41 with Central Asian Military District. Kyrgyz SSR national formation. 3.42 disbanded.
- 109th Cavalry Division – 12.41 with Central Asian Military District. Kyrgyz SSR national formation. 5.42 disbanded.
- 110th Cavalry Division – 12.41 with Stalingrad Military District. Kalmyk ASSR national formation. 1.43 disbanded.
- 111th Cavalry Division – 12.41 with Stalingrad MD. Kalmyk ASSR national formation. 4.42 disbanded.
- 112th Cavalry Division – 12.41 with Southern Urals MD. Became 16th Guards Cavalry Division on Feb 14, 1943. See also ru:112-я Башкирская кавалерийская дивизия.
- 113th Cavalry Division – 12.41 with Southern Urals MD. Bashkir ASSR national formation. 3.42 disbanded.
- 114th Cavalry Division – 12.41 with Svir-Caucasus MD. Chechen-Ingush ASSR national formation. In March 1942 the division was reduced in status to the 255th Separate Chechen-Ingush Cavalry Regiment.
- 115th Cavalry Division – 12.41 with Svir-Caucasus MD. Kabardino-Balkar ASSR national formation. 10.42 disbanded.
- 116th Cavalry Division – 4.42 with 17th Cavalry Corps. 8.42 became 12th Guards Cavalry Division.
- Independent Cavalry Division НО – 12.41 with 56th Army.

=== Guards Cavalry Divisions ===
- 1st Guards Cavalry Division – (ex 5th Cavalry Division 26.11.41). Fought at Moscow, Kharkov, Kiev, and in the Lvov-Sandomir, Carpathian, Berlin, and Prague Operations. With 1st Guards Cavalry Corps of the 1st Ukrainian Front 5.45.
- 2nd Guards Cavalry Division (ex 9th Cavalry Division 11.41). Fought at Kiev and Zhitomir. With 1st Guards Cavalry Corps of the 1st Ukrainian Front 5.45.
- 3rd Guards Cavalry Division (ex 50th Cavalry Division 11.41). With 2nd Guards Cavalry Corps of the 1st Belorussian Front 5.45.
- 4th Guards Cavalry Division (ex 53rd Cavalry Division 11.41). Fought at Battle of Moscow. With 2nd Guards Cavalry Corps of the 1st Belorussian Front 5.45.
- 5th Guards Cavalry Division – (ex 3rd Cavalry Division 22.12.41). Fought near Stalingrad and in Kurland. With 3rd Guards Cavalry Corps of the 2nd Belorussian Front 5.45. Elements of division later used in postwar formation of the 1st (later the 18th) Tank Division. The 18th was later reorganised as the 5th Guards Tank Division, which remains active today, having been relocated to the Transbaikal Military District in 1965.
- 6th Guards Cavalry Division (ex 14th Cavalry Division 12.41). Fought at Stalingrad, Smolensk, and in the Belorussian Operation, East Prussia, and Kurland. With 3rd Guards Cavalry Corps of the 2nd Belorussian Front 5.45. Disbanded 7.46.
- 7th Guards Cavalry Division (ex 31st Cavalry Division 5.1.42). Fought at Kaluga, Kharkov, Kiev, Sandomir, and in the Berlin Operation. With 1st Guards Cavalry Corps of the 1st Ukrainian Front 5.45.
- 8th Guards Cavalry Division (ex 11th Cavalry Division). With 6th Guards Cavalry Corps of the 2nd Ukrainian Front 5.45, near Stalingrad in 1946.
- 9th Guards Cavalry Division (ex 12th Cavalry Division 27.8.42). Fought near Mozdok, Stavropol, Melitopol, Odessa, Debrecen, Budapest, and Prague.
- 10th Guards Cavalry Division (ru:10-я гвардейская казачья кавалерийская дивизия; ex 13th Cavalry Division 27.8.42). Fought near Mozdok, Stavropol, Melitopol, Odessa, Debrecen, Budapest, and Prague. With 4th Guards Cavalry Corps of the 2nd Ukrainian Front 5.45.
- 11th Guards Cavalry Division (ex 15th Cavalry Division 8.42). Fought at Korsun and Targul Frumos. With the 5th Guards Cavalry Corps of the 3rd Ukrainian Front 5.45.
- 12th Guards Cavalry Division (ex 116th Cavalry Division 8.42). Fought at Korsun and Targul Frumos. With the 5th Guards Cavalry Corps of the 3rd Ukrainian Front 5.45.
- 13th Guards 'Ровенская' Cavalry Division (ex 83rd Mountain Cavalry Division 1.43). Fought at Dubno in 1944. With 6th Guards Cavalry Corps of the 2nd Ukrainian Front 5.45, became 30th Guards Tank Division in the Carpathian Military District, which became the 30th Mechanized Brigade in 2004 after the fall of the Soviet Union.
- 14th Guards Cavalry Division (ex 21st Mountain Cavalry Division 14.2.43). Fought near Chernigov, and in the Lublin-Brest, East Pomerania, and Berlin Operations. With 7th Guards Cavalry Corps of the 1st Belorussian Front 5.45.
- 15th Guards Cavalry Division (ex 55th Cavalry Division 14.2.43). Fought near Chernigov, and in the Lublin-Brest, East Pomeranian, and Berlin Operations. With 7th Guards Cavalry Corps of the 1st Belorussian Front 5.45. 15 GCD eventually became 15th Guards Tank Division, which served with the Central Group of Forces in Hungary postwar, before being withdrawn to Chebarkul in the Urals after 1990 and eventually being disbanded there c. 2002–4.
- 16th Guards Cavalry Division (ex 112th Cavalry Division 14.2.43). 'Bashkir Chernigovskaya Order of Lenin, Red Banner Orders of Suvorov and Kutuzov Division.' Bashkir SSR national formation. Raised from 112th Bashkir Cavalry Division. Fought near Chernigov, and in the Lublin-Brest, East Pomerania, and Berlin Operations. With 7th Guards Cavalry Corps of the 1st Belorussian Front 5.45. 14th and 16 Guards Cavalry Divisions of 7th Guards Cavalry Corps together eventually became 23rd Motor Rifle Division, which ended up in the Trans-Caucasus region as part of 4th Army.
- 17th Guards Cavalry Mozyr Order of Lenin, Red Banner, Orders of Suvorov and Kutuzov Division. Tajik national formation. Ex 20th Mountain Cavalry Division 8.43. Fought near Brest 8.44. With 2nd Guards Cavalry Corps of the 1st Belorussian Front 5.45.

== Tank Divisions ==
The Red Army tank divisions of the Great Patriotic War (1941–1945) were short-lived. In the face of the German invasion of 1941, many poorly maintained vehicles were abandoned, and those that did meet the Germans in battle were defeated by the superior training, doctrine, and radio communications of the Panzertruppe. The magnitude of the defeat was so great that the mechanized corps parent headquarters of the tank divisions were either inactivated or destroyed by July 1941. Most of the tank divisions facing the Germans had met a similar fate by the end of 1941. The Soviets opted to organize more easily controlled tank brigades instead, eventually combining many of these into three-brigade tank corps in 1942, an organizational structure that served them until the end of the war. Until late in the war, two tank divisions remained in the Far East, serving in the Transbaikal Military District.

- 1st Tank Division – with 1st Mechanised Corps in Jun 1941.
- 2nd Tank Division – formed June–July 1940. With 3rd Mechanised Corps in Jun 1941.
- 3rd Tank Division – with 1st Mechanised Corps in Jun 1941.
- 4th Tank Division – with 6th Mechanised Corps in Jun 1941.
- 5th Tank Division – formed June–July 1940. With 3rd Mechanised Corps in Jun 1941.
- 6th Tank Division – with 28th Mechanised Corps in June 1941. 6th Tank Division was part of the Transcaucasian Front when the Front moved into Iran, but was withdrawn from Iran in September 1941, whereas in November it was deployed by Novocherkassk with the 56th Army.
- 7th Tank Division – with 6th Mechanised Corps in June 1941.
- 8th Tank Division – with 4th Mechanized Corps in Jun 1941.
- 9th Tank Division – with 27th Mechanised Corps in June 1941. Quickly separated from 27th Mechanised Corps and re-designated 104th Tank Division.
- 10th Tank Division – with 15th Mechanised Corps in June 1941. Ground down to a strength of 20 vehicles while serving with 40th Army. Broken up August–September 1941 and reorganised as 131st and 133rd Tank Battalions.
- 11th Tank Division – with 2nd Mechanized Corps in June 1941.
- 12th Tank Division – with 8th Mechanized Corps in June 1941.
- 13th Tank Division – with 5th Mechanized Corps in June 1941.
- 14th Tank Division – with 7th Mechanized Corps in June 1941.
- 15th Tank Division – with 16th Mechanized Corps in June 1941.
- 16th Tank Division – with 2nd Mechanized Corps in June 1941.
- 17th Tank Division – with 5th Mechanized Corps in June 1941.
- 18th Tank Division – with 7th Mechanized Corps in June 1941.
- 19th Tank Division – with 22nd Mechanized Corps in June 1941.
- 20th Tank Division – with 9th Mechanized Corps in June 1941.
- 21st Tank Division – with 10th Mechanized Corps in June 1941, with 201 or 217 tanks. By 1 October 1941, part of 54th Army but had no tanks remaining.
- 22nd Tank Division – with 14th Mechanized Corps in Jun 1941.
- 23rd Tank Division – with 12th Mechanized Corps in June 1941, disbanded by August 1941.
- 24th Tank Division – with 10th Mechanized Corps in June 1941.
- 25th Tank Division – with 13th Mechanized Corps in June 1941.
- 26th Tank Division – with 20th Mechanized Corps in June 1941.
- 27th Tank Division – with 17th Mechanized Corps in June 1941.
- 28th Tank Division – with 12th Mechanized Corps in June 1941. With 27th Army on 1 November 1941, not listed in BSSA next month.
- 29th Tank Division – with 11th Mechanized Corps in June 1941.
- 30th Tank Division – with 14th Mechanized Corps in June 1941.
- 31st Tank Division – with 13th Mechanized Corps in June 1941. (in Shchuchyn area 1941)
- 32nd Tank Division – with 4th Mechanized Corps in June 1941.
- 33rd Tank Division – with 11th Mechanized Corps, 3rd Army in Jun 1941.
- 34th Tank Division – with 8th Mechanized Corps in June 1941. On disbandment, elements reorganised as 16th Tank Brigade, which was later transferred bodily from the Red Army to the Polish Armed Forces in the East. See pl:16 Dnowsko-Łużycka Brygada Pancerna.
- 35th Tank Division – with 9th Mechanized Corps in June 1941.
- 36th Tank Division – with 17th Mechanized Corps in June 1941.
- 37th Tank Division – with 15th Mechanized Corps in June 1941.
- 38th Tank Division – with 20th Mechanized Corps in June 1941.
- 39th Tank Division – with 16th Mechanized Corps in June 1941.
- 40th Tank Division – with 19th Mechanized Corps in June 1941.
- 41st Tank Division – with 22nd Mechanized Corps in June 1941.
- 42nd Tank Division – with 21st Mechanized Corps in June 1941, disbanded by August 1941.
- 43rd Tank Division – with 19th Mechanized Corps in June 1941.
- 44th Tank Division – with 18th Mechanized Corps in June 1941.
- 45th Tank Division – with 24th Mechanized Corps in June 1941.
- 46th Tank Division – with 21st Mechanized Corps in June 1941, disbanded by August 1941.
- 47th Tank Division – with 18th Mechanized Corps in June 1941.
- 48th Tank Division – with 23rd Mechanized Corps in June 1941. Reorganised as 17th and 18th Tank Brigades in September 1941.
- 49th Tank Division – with 24th Mechanized Corps in June 1941.
- 50th Tank Division – with 25th Mechanized Corps in June 1941.
- 51st Tank Division – with 23rd Mechanized Corps in June 1941.
- 52nd Tank Division – with 26th Mechanized Corps in June 1941.
- 53rd Tank Division – with 27th Mechanized Corps in June 1941.
- 54th Tank Division – with 28th Mechanized Corps in June 1941.
- 55th Tank Division – with 25th Mechanized Corps in June 1941. Destroyed August 1941 at Chernigov and remnants became 8th and 14th Separate Tank Battalions.
- 56th Tank Division – formed from two cavalry divisions. With 26th Mechanized Corps in June 1941. Formed the basis of 102nd Tank Division in mid-July 1941.
- 57th Tank Division – with Transbaikal Military District in June 1941.
- 58th Tank Division – with 30th Mechanized Corps in Far East in June 1941. Became 58th Tank Brigade on 31 December 1941.
- 59th Tank Division – with 2nd Red Banner Army in Far East in Jun 1941.
- 60th Tank Division – with 30th Mechanized Corps in Far East in June 1941. Became 60th Tank Brigade on 20.1.1942.
- 61st Tank Division – with 17th Army, Transbaikal Military District in June 1941, and still there in May 1945.
- 101st Tank Division – formed after July 1941; with Western Front in Aug 1941.
- 102nd Tank Division – formed after July 1941 from 56th Tank Division. With Reserve Front in August 1941. Became 144th Separate Tank Brigade on 10.9.1941. (ru:102-я танковая дивизия (СССР))
- 104th Tank Division – formed 15 July 1941 by re-designation of 9th Tank Division; with Western Front in August 1941. Disbanded by being redesignated as a tank brigade 6.91941.
- 105th Tank Division – formed after July 1941; with Reserve Front in August 1941.
- 107th Tank Division – formed after July 1941; with Western Front in August 1941. Became 107th Motor Rifle Division 16.9.1941, and, three months after that, 2nd Guards Motor Rifle Division on 12.1.1942.
- 108th Tank Division – formed after July 1941, possibly redesignation or split of 69th Mechanised Division. with Reserve Front in August 1941. Becomes 108th Tank Brigade on 2.12.1941.
- 109th Tank Division – formed after July 1941; with Central Front in August 1941.
- 110th Tank Division – formed after July 1941; with Reserve Front in August 1941. On July 21, the commander of 30th Army disbanded the 110th Tank Division and distributed its battalions to his rifle divisions; the battalion reassigned to the 250th Rifle Division was supposed to consist of two companies, one of ten T-34s and one of ten BT of T-26 light tanks, plus a command tank.
- 111th Tank Division – formed 15.7.1941. With the Transbaikal Front in May 1945. By November 1945 was at Nalaykh, Mongolia. Redesignated 4 March 1955 as 16th Tank Division, disbanded July 1957.
- 112th Tank Division – formed in August 1941 in Primorsky Krai on the basis of 112th Tank Regiment, 239th Mechanised Division, 30th Mechanized Corps, under Colonel Andrei Getman. With the Far Eastern Front in Sept 1941. Becomes 112th Tank Brigade on 3.1.1942.

== Artillery Divisions ==
- 1st (Tank) destroyer artillery division - 25 May 1942 with South-Western Front
- 2nd (Tank) destroyer artillery division - 25 May 1942 with Bryansk Front
- 3rd (Tank) destroyer artillery division - 25 May 1942 with Western Front
- 4th (Tank) destroyer artillery division - 6 June 1942 with Kalinin Front
- 5th (Tank) destroyer artillery division - 6 June 1942 with Stalingrad Military District
- 1st Breakthrough Artillery Division – with 70th Army of the 2nd Belorussian Front May 1945.
- 1st Guards Glukhovshchinskaya Order of Lenin, Red Banner Znameni, Orders of Suvorov (II), Kutuzov (II), and Bogdan Khmelnitskiy (II) Artillery Division – formed from 1st Artillery Division 1 March 1943 and fought with the Voronezh, later 1st Ukrainian Fronts.
- 2nd Breakthrough Artillery Division – with 5th Shock Army of the 1st Belorussian Front May 1945.
- 2nd Guards Perekop Red Banner Order of Suvorov (II) Artillery Division created on 1 March 1943 from the 4th Artillery Division and fought with the Southern, 4th Ukrainian, 1st Baltic and 2nd Baltic Fronts.
- 2nd Guards Breakthrough Artillery Division – with 3rd Belorussian Front May 1945.
- 3rd Breakthrough Artillery Division – with 5th Guards Army of the 1st Ukrainian Front 5.45.
- 3rd Guards Breakthrough Artillery Division – with 3rd Belorussian Front May 1945.
- 4th Breakthrough Artillery Division – with 1st Ukrainian Front 5.45.
- 4th Guards Heavy Gun Artillery Division – with 3rd Belorussian Front May 1945. Became 43rd Guards Rocket Division of the SRF?
- 5th Breakthrough Artillery Division – with 3rd Shock Army of the 1st Belorussian Front May 1945.
- 5th Guards Breakthrough Artillery Division – with 2nd Ukrainian Front 5.45.
- 6th Breakthrough Artillery Division – with 47th Army of the 1st Belorussian Front May 1945.
- 6th Guards Breakthrough Artillery Division – with 1st Shock Army of the Kurland Group (Leningrad Front) May 1945. In Manchuria Aug 1945.
- 7th Breakthrough Artillery Division – with 3rd Ukrainian Front May 1945. See ru:7-я артиллерийская дивизия прорыва.
- 8th Gun Artillery Division – with Kurland Group (Leningrad Front) May 1945.
- 9th Breakthrough Artillery Division – with 3rd Ukrainian Front 5.45.
- 10th Breakthrough Artillery Division – with 3rd Belorussian Front May 1945. In August 1959, on the basis of the disbanded 10th Breakthrough Artillery Division, the formation of an organizational group of 46 Training Artillery Range (Military Unit No. 43176) temporarily located in Mozyr, Gomel Oblast, Byelorussian SSR, was begun. 46 Training Artillery Range later became 27th Guards Rocket Army.
- 11th Artillery Division – with 53rd Army of the 2nd Ukrainian Front 5.45.
- 12th Breakthrough Artillery Division – with 3rd Shock Army of the 1st Belorussian Front May 1945.
- 13th Breakthrough Artillery Division – with 60th Army of the 4th Ukrainian Front 5.45.
- 14th Breakthrough Artillery Division – with 5th Shock Army of the 1st Belorussian Front May 1945.
- 15th Breakthrough Artillery Division – with 2nd Shock Army of the 2nd Belorussian Front May 1945.
- 16th Breakthrough Artillery Division – with 7th Guards Army of the 2nd Ukrainian Front 5.45.
- 17th Artillery Division – with 13th Army of the 1st Ukrainian Front 5.45.
- 18th Breakthrough Artillery Division – with 8th Guards Army of the 1st Belorussian Front May 1945.
- 19th Breakthrough Artillery Division – with 3rd Ukrainian Front 5.45.
- 20th Breakthrough Artillery Division – Fought at Kursk, and in East Prussia and Kurland. With 1st Shock Army of the Kurland Group (Leningrad Front) May 1945.
- 21st Breakthrough Artillery Division – Fought in the Bagration operation, in East Prussia and Kurland; with Kurland Group (Leningrad Front) May 1945.
- 22nd Breakthrough Artillery Division – with 33rd Army of the 1st Belorussian Front May 1945.
- 23rd Breakthrough Artillery Division – with 49th Army of the 2nd Belorussian Front May 1945.
- 24th Breakthrough Artillery Division – with 38th Army of the 4th Ukrainian Front 5.45.
- 25th Breakthrough Artillery Division – with 28th Army of the 1st Ukrainian Front 5.45.
- 26th Artillery Division – with 65th Army of the 2nd Belorussian Front May 1945.
- 27th Artillery Division – with 1st Shock Army of the Kurland Group (Leningrad Front) 5.45.
- 28th Breakthrough Artillery Division – Fought in Kurland; with Kurland Group (Leningrad Front) May 1945.
- 29th Breakthrough Artillery Division – with 8th Guards Army of the 1st Belorussian Front May 1945.
- 30th Breakthrough Artillery Division – with 2nd Ukrainian Front May 1945.
- 31st Breakthrough Artillery Division – with 1st Ukrainian Front 5.45.
- 34th Artillery Division, Potsdam, Group of Soviet Forces in Germany (formed 25 June 1945 to July 9, 1945, in Germany)

== Guards Rocket Artillery Divisions ==
All Guards Rocket Artillery Divisions were disbanded between August and September 1945.

- 1st Guards Rocket Krasnoselsk Red Banner Artillery Division – Formed Sep 1942 at Moscow Military District; with ? Front Jan 1945.
- 2nd Guards Rocket Gorodokskaya Red Banner Order of Alexander Nevskiy Artillery Division – Formed Sep 1942; with 1st Baltic Front Jan 1945.
- 3rd Guards Rocket Kiev Red Banner Orders of Kutuzov (2nd class) and Bogdan Khmelnitskiy (II) Artillery Division – Formed Sep 1942; with 1st Ukrainian Front Jan 1945.
- 4th Guards Rocket Sivashskaya Order of Alexander Nevskiy Artillery Division – Formed Sep 1942; with 2nd Belorussian Front Jan 1945.
- 5th Guards Rocket Kalinkovichskaya Red Banner Order of Suvorov (2nd class) Artillery Division – Formed Jan 1943; with 1st Belorussian Front Jan 1945.
- 6th Guards Rocket Bratislava Artillery Division – Formed Jan 1943; with 2nd Ukrainian Front 5.45.
- 7th Guards Rocket Kovenskaya Red Banner Orders of Suvorov (2nd class) and Kutuzov (2nd class) Artillery Division – Formed Feb 1943; with 3rd Belorussian Front May 1945.

== Anti-Aircraft Divisions ==
- 1st Anti-Aircraft Artillery Division – with 21st Army, Don Front and South-Western Front before renamed into 2nd Guards AA Division
- 1st Guards Anti-Aircraft Artillery Division was a part of the Soviet Air Defence Forces (PVO Strany).
- 2nd Anti-Aircraft Artillery Division – with the 3rd Belorussian Front May 1945.
- 2nd Guards Anti-Aircraft Artillery Division – with 5th Shock Army of the 1st Belorussian Front May 1945.
- 3rd Anti-Aircraft Artillery Division – with the 3rd Ukrainian Front May 1945.
- 3rd Guards AA Division – with Eighth Guards Army of the 1st Belorussian Front May 1945.
- 4th Anti-Aircraft Artillery Division – with the 3rd Ukrainian Front May 1945.
- 4th Guards AA Division – with 1st Guards Tank Army of the 1st Belorussian Front May 1945.
- 5th Anti-Aircraft Artillery Division – with Seventh Guards Army of the 2nd Ukrainian Front May 1945.
- 5th Guards AA Division – with 9th Guards Army of the 3rd Ukrainian Front May 1945.
- 6th AA Division – with 5th Guards Tank Army of the 2nd Belorussian Front May 1945.
- 6th Guards AA Division – with 4th Guards Tank Army of the 1st Ukrainian Front May 1945.
- 7th AA Division – with 8th Army of the Leningrad Front May 1945.
- 9th AA Division – with the 3rd Ukrainian Front May 1945.
- 10th AA Division – with 13th Army of the 1st Ukrainian Front May 1945.
- 11th AA Division – with 46th Army of the 2nd Ukrainian Front May 1945.
- 12th AA Division – with 65th Army of the 2nd Belorussian Front May 1945.
- 14th AA Division – with 10th Guards Army of the Kurland Group (Leningrad Front) May 1945.
- 17th AA Division – with 51st Army of the Kurland Group (Leningrad Front) May 1945.
- 18th AA Division – with 69th Army of the 1st Belorussian Front May 1945.
- 19th AA Division – with 3rd Shock Army of the 1st Belorussian Front May 1945.
- 20th AA Division – with 61st Army of the 1st Belorussian Front May 1945.
- 21st AA Division – with 52nd Army of the 1st Ukrainian Front May 1945.
- 22nd AA Division – with the 3rd Ukrainian Front May 1945.
- 23rd AA Division – with the 1st Ukrainian Front May 1945.
- 24th AA Division – with 2nd Guards Tank Army of the 1st Belorussian Front May 1945.
- 25th AA Division – with 1st Guards Army of the 4th Ukrainian Front May 1945.
- 26th AA Division – with 7th Guards Army of the 2nd Ukrainian Front May 1945.
- 27th AA Division – with 53rd Army of the 2nd Ukrainian Front May 1945.
- 28th AA Division – with 70th Army of the 2nd Belorussian Front May 1945.
- 29th AA Division – with 5th Guards Army of the 1st Ukrainian Front May 1945.
- 30th AA Division – with the 2nd Ukrainian Front May 1945.
- 31st AA Division – appears to have been with 47th Army in Jan 1945, with four anti-aircraft artillery regiments (BSSA). With 3rd Army of the 1st Belorussian Front May 1945.
- 33rd AA Division – with the 3rd Belorussian Front May 1945.
- 34th AA Division – with 11th Guards Army of the 3rd Belorussian Front May 1945.
- 35th AA Division – with 37th Army in Bulgaria May 1945.
- 36th AA Division – with 1st Shock Army of the Kurland Group (Leningrad Front) May 1945.
- 37th AA Division – with 21st Army of the 1st Ukrainian Front May 1945.
- 38th AA Division – with the 2nd Ukrainian Front May 1945.
- 39th AA Division – with 6th Guards Army of the Kurland Group (Leningrad Front) May 1945.
- 40th AA Division — with 14th Army near Kirkenes May 1945.
- 41st AA Division – with Kurland Group (Leningrad Front) May 1945.
- 42nd AA Division – with 42nd Army of the Kurland Group (Leningrad Front) May 1945.
- 43rd AA Division – with 60th Army of the 4th Ukrainian Front May 1945.
- 44th AA Division – with 67th Army of the Leningrad Front May 1945.
- 45th AA Division – with the 3rd Belorussian Front May 1945.
- 46th AA Division – with 51st Army of the Kurland Group (Leningrad Front) May 1945.
- 47th AA Division – with the 2nd Belorussian Front May 1945.
- 48th AA Division – with the 3rd Belorussian Front May 1945.
- 49th AA Division – with 49th Army of the 2nd Belorussian Front May 1945.
- 50th - 63rd AA Divisions were of the air defense forces (PVO Strany).
- 64th AA Division – with 33rd Army of the 1st Belorussian Front May 1945.
- 65th AA Division – with the 2nd Belorussian Front May 1945.
- 66th AA Division – with 48th Army of the 3rd Belorussian Front May 1945.
- 67th AA Division – with the 3rd Belorussian Front May 1945.
- 68th Anti-Aircraft Artillery Division – became 6th Guards Anti-Aircraft Artillery Division March 1945
- 69th AA Division – with the 3rd Guards Army of the 1st Ukrainian Front May 1945.
- 70th AA Division – with Kiev Military District May 1945.
- 71st AA Division – with the 1st Ukrainian Front May 1945.
- 72nd AA Division – in RVGK reserve of the Stavka May 1945.
- 73rd AA Division – with 4th Shock Army of the Kurland Group (Leningrad Front) May 1945.
- 74th AA Division – with 47th Army of the 1st Belorussian Front May 1945.
- 76th AA Division – with 38th Army of the 4th Ukrainian Front May 1945.

== Aviation divisions ==
See Aviation Division for Soviet Air Forces divisions and Soviet Naval Aviation for naval aviation divisions

== Divisions Disbanded 1945–89 ==
- Disbanded 1958(?)← 1957 7th MRD<-7th Mech Div <-1946/55← 7th Mech Corps
- 343 (55) Rifle Division 1946–55, 136 MRD 1957, Disbanded 1958
- Disbanded 1958←137 MRD 1957 ←345 (57) RD 1946–55
- Disbanded 1959←138 MRD 1957 ←358 (59) RD 1946–55
- Disbanded 1960←139 MRD 1957 ←349 (60) RD 1946–55
- Disbanded 1959←140 MRD 1957 ←374 (70) RD 1946–55
- Disbanded 1958←142 Mtn RD 1957 ←376 (72) RD 1955
- Disbanded 1960←143 Gds MRD 1957←72G Mech Div 1946(1955) ←110 GRD
- Disbanded 1958<144 MRD 1957<97 RD 1946 (1955)

== See also ==
- List of Soviet armies
- List of Soviet Army divisions 1989–91
- Soviet Rifle Corps

== Notes ==
All Russian source notes are via Lenskii.
