= 43rd Cavalry Division =

- Active: July 1941 – 9 February 1942
- Country: Soviet Union
- Branch: Cavalry
- Role: Breakthrough and Exploitation in Deep Operations
- Size: Division

The 43rd Cavalry Division was a cavalry division of the Red Army during World War II.

It was one of the first cavalry divisions formed after the start of the war. The unit was formed in the North Caucasus Military District using the cadre and troops of the district's cavalry training grounds.

== Combat service ==
Declared ready for combat less than a week after formation the division was in the 21st Army by 19 July 1941. The next day the division was assigned to the Batskelevich Cavalry Group under the command of the 32nd Cavalry Division's commander. In July and August 1941 the group and the division raided into the rear areas and flanks of the German 2nd Army and 2nd Panzer Group south of Smolensk. In September 1941 the division was assigned as the mobile reserve group for the 21st Army and remained there until the end of the year.

The division took part in the Soviet Winter counteroffensive but the division like all the other units in the Southwestern Front was severely worn down prior to the start of the offensive. The remnants of the division were disbanded on 9 February 1942 to provide replacements for other cavalry units assigned to the front.

== Subordinate units ==
- 35th Cavalry Regiment
- 38th Cavalry Regiment
- 40th Cavalry Regiment

== See also ==
- Cavalry Divisions of the Soviet Union 1917-1945
