= 1st Rifle Division =

1st Rifle Division may refer to:

- 1st Siberian Rifle Division (Russian Empire)
- 1st Rifle Division (Soviet Union)
  - 1st Caucasian Rifle Division (Soviet Union) (1922–1931)
  - 1st Kazan Rifle Division (1922–1936)
  - 1st Rifle Division (1942)
  - 1st Rifle Division NKVD (1941–1942)
  - 1st Crimea Rifle Division (1941)
- 1st Guards Rifle Division (1941–1942)
- 1st Guards Rifle Division (1943–1945)

== See also ==
- 1st Division (disambiguation)
