= Mechanised corps (Soviet Union) =

Military formation type and size designation

The mechanised corps were a Soviet Red Army armoured formation used prior to the beginning of World War II and reintroduced during the war, in 1942.

== Pre-war development of Soviet mechanised forces ==
In Soviet Russia, the term armored forces (thus called Bronevyye sily) preceded the mechanised corps. They consisted of the autonomous armored units (avtobroneotryady) made of armored vehicles and armored trains. The country did not have its own tanks during the Civil War of 1918–1920.

In January 1918, the Russian Red Army established the Soviet of Armored Units (Sovet bronevykh chastey, or Tsentrobron’), later renamed to Central Armored Directorate and then once again to Chief Armored Directorate (Glavnoye bronevoye upravleniye). In December 1920, the Red Army received its first light tanks, assembled at the Sormovo Factory. In 1928, it began the production of the MS-1 tanks (Malyy Soprovozhdeniya 1, 'Small Convoy 1'). In 1929, it established the Central Directorate for Mechanisation and Motorisation of the Workers’ and Peasants’ Red Army. Tanks became a part of the mechanised corps at this point.

During this time, and based on the experience of the Civil War with its sweeping movements of horse-mobile formations, Soviet military theorists such as Vladimir Triandafillov born in Pontus of Greek parents and Konstantin Kalinovsky elaborated the principles of combat use of armored units, which envisioned a large-scale use of tanks in different situations in cooperation with various army units. In the mid-1930s, these ideas found their reflection in the so-called deep operation and deep combat theories. From the second half of the 1920s, tank warfare development took place at Kazan, where the German Reichswehr was allowed to participate.

In 1930, the First Mechanised Brigade had its own tank regiment of 110 tanks. The formation of two mechanized corps was authorized in 1932. The first two corps formed were the 11th Mechanized Corps in the Leningrad Military District and the 45th Mechanized Corps, formed in the Ukrainian Military District. That same year, the Red Army established the Military Academy of Mechanization and Motorization of the Workers’ and Peasants’ Red Army (which existed up until 1998 as the Military Academy of Armored Units named after Rodion Malinovsky). Mikhail Katukov had his first major command as acting commanding officer of the 5th light Tank Brigade of the 45th Mechanized Corps in 1938.

In 1931–1935, the Red Army adopted light, medium, and later heavy tanks of different types. By the beginning of the 1936, it already had four mechanised corps, six separate mechanised brigades, six separate tank regiments, fifteen mechanised regiments within cavalry divisions and considerable number of tank battalions and companies. The creation of mechanised and tank units marked the dawn of a new branch of armed forces, which would be called armored forces. In 1937, the Central Directorate of Mechanization and Motorization was renamed to Directorate of Automotive Armored Units (Avtobronetankovoye upravleniye) and then to Chief Directorate of Automotive Armored Units (Glavnoye avtobronetankovoye upravleniye), headed by Dmitry Pavlov. This was carried out under Marshal Tukhachevsky, one of the generals shot in June 1937 in the Great Purge.

Soviet armored units gained some combat experience during the Battle of Lake Khasan (1938), the Battle of Khalkhin Gol (1939) and the Winter War with Finland (1939–1940). But these operations and also observation of the Spanish Civil War, led People’s Commissar for Defence Marshal Voroshilov to the conclusion that the mechanised corps formations were too cumbersome. A decision was taken to disband them in November 1939, and to distribute their units among infantry. This was a mistake, as the success of German panzer divisions in France showed, and in May 1940 Voroshilov was replaced by Marshal Timoshenko. Future Marshal Zhukov had drawn different conclusions from his own experience at Khalkhin Gol and from the other battles.

The decision was reversed, and on 6 July 1940 the NKO ordered the formation of nine new mechanised corps, and in February and March 1941, began forming an additional 20. By June 1941, 29 existed in the Red Army, although their degree of staffing significantly varied. However, there was not enough time before the German attack in June 1941 to reform the mechanised corps units fully and for them to reach their former efficiency.

== Period 1940–41 ==
In June 1941 there were twenty-nine mechanised corps in various stages of formation. The plan was for each of them to have about 36,000 men and 1,000 tanks. The first iteration of the Red Army's tank divisions, as part of the Mechanised Corps, were in 1940 organized under Shtat 010/10; their tank regiments under 010/16; and their mechanised regiments under 010/15. The Mechanised Corps Headquarters was organised in accordance with Shtat 010/20. The motorized divisions of the corps were organized by Shtat 05/70, Division Headquarters; Shtat 05/71, Motorized Rifle Regiment, Shtat 05/72 Artillery Regiment and Shtat 05/73, Tank Regiment.

Only a few corps approached authorized strength levels by the time Nazi Germany invaded the USSR. Of this number, two formations especially stood out: 4th and 6th Mechanized Corps. On 22 June 1941 each of these was fully formed, armed with more than 900 operational tanks, and stationed not further than 100–300 kilometers from the border. Considering the armor qualities, each of these formations had a substantial concentration of the T-34 and KV-1 tanks. Both of these formations, having more than 350 of the T-34 plus KV-1, could be reasonably expected to break through any German Panzer Corps of the time, not to say Army Corps. Such estimation is based on sheer number of concentrated tanks, their main armament, the thickness of their armor, their actual failure rate, the eventual losses to aircraft, and normal scheduled maintenance. What it does not count are human-related factors.

That being said, during the war against the Axis, all mechanised corps stationed in frontline areas were destroyed during the early phase of the invasion of the Soviet Union (including 4th and 6th), and less than a month after the attack, the Red Army formally abolished the Mechanised Corps as a formation type. Remaining tanks were concentrated in smaller formations that were easier to handle.

== Period 1942–46 ==
In September 1942, the General Headquarters (Stavka) authorized the formation of a new type of mechanised corps which was to become the main operational mechanised formation for the remainder of the war. They were about the same size as a German panzer division, and designed as a true combined-arms formation with a good balance of armor, infantry, and artillery. Mechanised corps were not to be used in breakthrough battles, but only in the exploitation phase of an operation. They shared with the new Tank Corps a four-manoeuvre-brigade structure – three mechanised brigades and one tank brigade, plus an anti-tank regiment, artillery, and other support units. The new tank corps had three tank brigades and one mechanised brigade.

A total of thirteen mechanised corps were formed during the war against the Axis nations, nine of them becoming guards mechanised corps. A further corps, the 10th Mechanised Corps, was formed in June 1945 and saw action during the Soviet invasion of Manchuria. The 1st, 3rd, and 9th Guards Mechanised Corps were equipped with Lend Lease tanks, Sherman M4A2. The mechanised corps were converted to mechanised divisions relatively quickly after the war – by 1946 in most cases.

== Composition of a mechanised corps (1941) ==
- 2 Tank Divisions
  - 2 Tank Regiments
  - Motorized Rifle Regiment
  - Motorized Howitzer Regiment
  - Division Troops
    - Antiaircraft Battalion
    - Armored Reconnaissance Battalion
    - Truck Battalion
    - Maintenance Battalion
    - Medical Battalion
- 1 Motorized Division
  - 2 Motorized Rifle Regiments
  - Light Tank Regiment
  - Motorized Artillery Regiment
  - Division Troops
    - Antitank Battalion
    - Antiaircraft Battalion
    - Reconnaissance Battalion
    - Truck Battalion
    - Division Trains
- Corps Troops
  - 1 Motorcycle Regiment
  - 1 Signal Battalion
  - 1 Motorized Engineer Battalion
  - 1 Aviation Troop

Total

1,031 Tanks (420 T-34s, 126 KVs, 485 Light tanks)
36,100 personnel
5 Tank Regiments with 20 Tank Battalions
4 Motorized Rifle Regiments with 12 Motorized Rifle Battalions
3 Motorized Artillery/Howitzer Regiments with 6 Artillery Battalions

The formation was seen as very tank-heavy, lacking sufficient infantry or artillery to support the tank formations. The 1942 order of battle was much more flexible.

== Composition of a mechanised corps (1944) ==
- 3 Mechanised Brigades
  - 1 Tank Regiment
  - 3 Motorized Rifle Battalions
  - 1 Submachine Gun Company
  - 1 Antitank Rifle Company
  - 1 Mortar Battalion
  - 1 Artillery Battalion
  - 1 Anti Aircraft Machine Gun Company
  - 1 Pioneer Mine Company
  - 1 Trains Company
  - 1 Medical Platoon
- 1 Tank Brigade
  - 3 Tank Battalions
  - 1 Motorized Submachine Gun Battalion
  - 1 Anti-aircraft Machine Gun Company
  - 1 Trains Company
  - 1 Medical Platoon
- 3 Assault Gun Regiments
- 1 Motorcycle Battalion
- 1 Mortar Regiment
- 1 Anti-aircraft Regiment
- 1 Rocket Launcher Battalion

Total:

246 Armored Fighting Vehicles (186 T-34, 21 SU-76, 21 ISU-122, 21 ISU-152)
16,438 personnel
3 Tank Regiments and 3 Tank Battalions
9 Motorised Rifle Battalions and 1 Motorised Submachine Gun Battalion
3 Motorised Artillery Battalions

== List of Soviet mechanised corps ==
The listing and data here are drawn from Keith E. Bonn, Slaughterhouse: Handbook of the Eastern Front, Aberjona Press, Bedford, PA, 2005, and V.I. Feskov et al., The Soviet Army during the Period of the Cold War, Tomsk University Press, Tomsk, 2004 (mostly pages 71–75).

- 1st Mechanised Corps – formed January 1941, at Pskov in the Leningrad Military District/Soviet Northern Front in June 1941. Disbanded in August. Reformed August 1942. Circa 1946 became 1st Mechanised Division, and after a brief period as 19th Motor Rifle Division in 1965 became 35th Motor Rifle Division. Served much of the Cold War with 20th Guards Army in GSFG.
- 2nd Mechanised Corps – 9th Army, Odessa Military District – On June 22, 1941, the 2nd Mechanised Corps was stationed in the Odessa district near Kisjinov. Comprised 11th Tank Division, 16th Tank Division, and 15th Mechanised Division. The corps was lightly involved until about the middle of July, when it was heavily engaged. By 7–8 August, the 2nd Mechanised Corps was totally destroyed.
- 3rd Mechanised Corps– 11th Army, Baltic Military District June 1941. Was encircled & largely destroyed at the Battle of Raseiniai in June 1941. Reformed Oct 1942 and became 8 GMC Oct 1943.
- 4th Mechanised Corps – formed Jan 41 and began war, under command of General Major Andrey Vlasov, with 6th Army, at Lvov in the Kiev Military District. Disbanded August, but reformed in Sept 1942 and became 3rd Guards Mech Corps.
- 5th Mechanised Corps – started the war in the Transbaikal Military District. Was with 16th Army on 1 July 1941. Consisted of 13th and 17th Tank Divisions and the 109th Mechanised Division. 126th Corps Artillery Regiment and the 112th Separate Anti-aircraft Artillery Battalion. Disbanded August 1941, reformed in November 1942, and in September 1944 converted to 9th Guards Mechanised Corps.
- 6th Mechanised Corps – formed June 1940 and started war with 10th Army, but disbanded or destroyed by end of July 1941. Reformed in November 1942, and in January 1943 converted into 5th Guards Mechanised Corps, which became 5th Guards Mechanised Division after the war, and after a brief period as 53rd Guards Motor Rifle Division from 1957 to 1965, became 5th Guards MRD and served with 40th Army at Shindand in Afghanistan for some years.
- 7th Mechanised Corps – started war in the Moscow Military District, under General Major V.I. Vinogradov. Comprised 14th and 18th Tank Divisions and 1st Moscow Motor Rifle Division, plus 9th Motorcycle Regiment. Disbanded and staff used to form 16th Army (Second Formation) August 1941. Reformed August 1943. After the war converted to 7th Mech Div with 5th Army in the Far East, but then disbanded in 1957.
- 8th Mechanised Corps – July 1940 – August 1941 in Kiev Special MD/Soviet Southwestern Front, including 12th Tank Division, 34th Tank Division, and 7th Mechanized Division. Destroyed in battle or disbanded. Reestablished August 1943. After war became 8th Mechanized Division, then 28th Tank Division, serving in the Belorussian Military District.
- 9th Mechanised Corps – formed November 1940. Started Barbarossa with 5th Army; disbanded Aug 1941. Reformed August 1943; assigned to 3rd Guards Tank Army until the end of the war. Took part in the clearing of left and right bank Ukraine, Lvov-Sandomir, Sandomir-Silesia, Lower Silesia, Berlin, and Prague offensives. In 1944 gained the names Zhitomir and Kiev as honorifics. Became 9th Mechanised Division, then 82nd Motor Rifle Division, before being disbanded in 1958 in the GSFG, still with 3 GTA.
- 10th Mechanized Corps – acting as Northern Front reserve in 1941 (21st, 24th TDs). Second establishment became 10th Mechanised Division after war, 84th MRD in 1957, 121st MRD in 1965, and finally 121st MRTD in the Far Eastern Military District.
- 11th Mechanised Corps – started Barbarossa with 3rd Army. Active March–August 1941, then disbanded.
- 12th Mechanized Corps – formed March 1941. Started Barbarossa with 8th Army, Baltic Military District & was disbanded following the Battle of Raseiniai in August 1941
- 13th Mechanised Corps – formed March 1941. Started war with 10th Army in the Western Front. Consisted of 25th and 31st Tank Division and 208th Motorised Division. Disbanded August 1941. This corps should not be confused with 13th Tank Corps, which was reorganised as a mechanised corps without a change of number in November 1942.
- 14th Mechanised Corps – activated March 1941. With 4th Army June 1941. Disbanded July.
- 15th Mechanised Corps
- 16th Mechanised Corps
- 17th Mechanised Corps – formed March 1941. Destroyed in the Battle of Białystok–Minsk and Battle of Smolensk . Became 147th Tank Brigade 1 August 1941.
- 18th Mechanised Corps
- 19th Mechanised Corps
- 20th Mechanised Corps – formed March 1941. Destroyed in the Battle of Białystok–Minsk.
- 21st Mechanised Corps – formed March 1941. Fought in Battle of Raseiniai June 1941. Disbanded Aug 1941.
- 22nd Mechanised Corps
- 23rd Mechanised Corps – 48th and 51st Tank Divisions and 220th Mechanised Division. Does not appear to have fought as a formation. By 1 August 1941, the corps appears to have been dispersed, with 48th Tank Division in 22nd Army of Western Front, 220th Division, now a standard rifle division, part of 32nd Army of Reserve Front, and 51st Tank Division having been redesignated (possibly as 108th or 110th Tank Division.) 51st Tank Division's prewar headquarters was at Bryansk. With the outbreak of hostilities it was a part of a corps of the 24th Army, but on 01.07.1941, was reassigned to the 19th Army. Most parts of the division remained on peacetime levels of equipment, and suffered shortages. For example, the nominal demand for motor vehicles on 03.07.1941 was 80%. For these reasons, the division remained raising its readiness near Rzhev, where Glantz notes it was to 'support the newly formed reserve armies' (BD p. 92). An exception was the 102nd Tank Regiment, which commanded by the 23rd Mechanized Corps was directed at Vitebsk, where it participated in the 10 July 1941 unsuccessful attempts to dislodge the enemy from the bridgehead on the eastern part of the city (see ru:Витебское сражение), along with the 220th Motor Rifle Division. (Source Ruwiki, 51st Tank Division)
- 24th Mechanised Corps – comprised 45th and 49th Tank Divisions & 216th Motorised Division, within the Kiev Special Military District on June 22, 1941.
- 25th Mechanised Corps – 50th TD eventually became 150th Tank Bn and was then destroyed at Vyazma in October 1941. 55th TD was destroyed at Chernigov in August 1941, and was reformed as the 8th and 14th Separate Tank Battalions. 219th Motorized Division was destroyed at Chernigov in August 1941.
- 26th Mechanised Corps – included 52nd and 56th Tank Divisions, 103rd Rifle Division, and 27th Motorcycle Regiment. North Caucasus Military District. Destroyed at Vyazma in October 1941.
- 27th Mechanised Corps – included 9th Tank Division, 53rd Tank Division, and 221st Motorised Division under General Major I.E. Petrov in the Central Asian Military District. In July 1941 the 9th and 53rd TDs became the 104th and 105th TDs respectively. By July the 221st Motorized Division had been "disbanded." By September the 104th and 105th TDs became the 145th and 146th Tank Brigades, respectively, and then in October the corps was destroyed at Vyazma.
- 28th Mechanised Corps – General Major V.V. Novikov, 6th Tank Division, 54th Tank Division, 236th Motorized Division, Transcaucasus Military District.
- 29th Mechanised Corps – formed March 1941, disbanded 7 May 1941
- 30th Mechanised Corps – active March–June 1941 in the Far Eastern Military District. General-leytenant V.S. Golubovskiy commanded the corps. 58th Tank Division, 60th Tank Division, 239th Motorized Division.

=== Guards ===
- 1st Guards Mechanised Corps – formed 24 October 1942 from the 1st Guards Rifle Division. Became 1st Guards Mechanised Division in July 1945. Became 2nd Guards Motor Rifle Division on 25 June 1957. It was converted into the 2nd Guards Training Motor Rifle Division on 4 May 1962, 16th Guards Training Motor Rifle Division on 17 November 1964, then 100th Guards Training Motor Rifle Division on 3 November 1967.
- 2nd Guards Mechanised Corps – formed Nov 1942 in Tambov region. Assigned in sequence to the Stalingrad, Southern, 4th, 3rd, and 2nd Ukrainian Fronts. 1945 took part in the Budapest, Bratislava-Brno, Prague, and Vienna operations. Became 2nd Guards Mechanised Division after the war, and then c. 1957 became 19th Guards Tank Division in Southern Group of Forces.
- 3rd Guards Mechanised Corps – formed from the 28th Tank Corps on 18 December 1942. Converted into the 3rd Guards Mechanised Division in November 1945. Became 47th Guards Motor Rifle Division 1957 and disbanded in 1959.
- 4th Guards Mechanised Corps – formed from 13th Tank Corps. Circa 1946 4th Guards Mechanised Division. Redesignated 5 June 1957 as 63rd Guards Motor Rifle Division at Lugansk, Kiev Military District. On 17 December 1964 redesignated 4th Guards Motor Rifle Division. On 15 February 1980 transferred to Termez, Surkhandar'inskaya Oblast, Turkestan Military District, to replace 108th Motor Rifle Division which had been sent to Afghanistan. The division's 15th Guards Motor Rifle Regiment was left behind, and was replaced by a new 1213th Motor Rifle Regiment, activated in Termez. Disbanded in March 1989 and parts absorbed by returning 108th Motor Rifle Division.
- 5th Guards Mechanised Corps – formed from the 6th Mechanized Corps created in June 1940 and started war with 10th Army, but disbanded or destroyed by end of July 1941. The corps was reformed in November 1942 under the same name, but with a different organizational structure. In January 1943, the 6th Mechanized Corps was granted "Guards" status and became the 5th Guards Mechanized Corps. It was renamed the 5th Guards Mechanized Division in 1945 and after a brief period as 53rd Guards Motor Rifle Division from 1957 to 1965, subsequently the 5th Guards Motor Rifle Division in 1965 and served with 40th Army at Shindand in Afghanistan for some years.
- 6th Guards Mechanised Corps – formed on 17 June 1943 from the 3rd Guards Motor Rifle Division. Converted into the 6th Guards Mechanised Division on 10 June 1945 with 4th Guards Tank Army. Became 6th Guards Motor Rifle Division on 30 April 1957 and 90th Guards Tank Division on 8 February 1985.
- 7th Guards Mechanised Corps – formed from the 2nd Mechanised Corps on 26 July 1943. Honorifics "Kuzbass-Nezhin". Converted into the 7th Guards Mechanised Division on 10 June 1945 with 4th Guards Tank Army. Became 11th Guards Motor Rifle Division on 30 April 1957.
- 8th Guards Mechanised Corps – formed from 3rd Mechanised Corps October 1943, after having taken part in the Battle of Kursk. From its formation to the end of the war, the Corps served with 1st Guards Tank Army. In April 1944 awarded 'Carpathian' honorific. On 10 June 1945, it became the 8th Guards Mechanised Division. Converted into the 20th Guards Motor Rifle Division in 1957, serving with 1st Guards Tank Army in Group of Soviet Forces in Germany postwar.
- 9th Guards Mechanised Corps – formed from the 5th Mechanised Corps (Third Formation) on 12 September 1944. Became 9th Guards Mechanised Division by October 1945, then 9th Guards Motor Rifle Division in 1957. The division was disbanded on 1 November 1958 while serving with the 6th Guards Tank Army in the Transbaikal Military District at Sainshand.

== See also ==
- Cavalry corps (Soviet Union)
- Rifle corps (Soviet Union)
- Tank corps (Soviet Union)

== Sources and further reading ==
- Page, Joseph; Bean, Tim; Fowler, Will (2002). Russian Tanks of World War II. MBI. ISBN 9780760313022.
- Cross, Robin (1993). Citadel: The Battle of Kursk. New York: Sarpedon. ISBN 0-9627613-6-2.
- Evgeniĭ Drig, Механизированные корпуса РККА в бою : история автобронетанковых войск Красной Армии в 1940–1941 годах /[Mekhanizirovannye korpusa RKKA v boi︠u︡ : istorii︠a︡ avtobronetankovykh voĭsk Krasnoĭ Armii v 1940–1941 godakh],АСТ : Транзиткнига, Moskva : AST : Tranzitkniga, 2005.
- Feskov, V.I.; Golikov, V.I.; Kalashnikov, K.A.; Slugin, S.A. (2013). Вооруженные силы СССР после Второй Мировой войны: от Красной Армии к Советской [The Armed Forces of the USSR after World War II: From the Red Army to the Soviet: Part 1 Land Forces] (in Russian). Tomsk: Scientific and Technical Literature Publishing. ISBN 9785895035306.
- Glantz, David, The Initial Period of War on the Eastern Front, 22 June–August 1941, p. 19
- Glantz, David (1998). Stumbling Colossus: The Red Army on the Eve of World War. ISBN 0-7006-0879-6.
- Glantz, David M. (2010). Barbarossa Derailed: The German Advance to Smolensk, the Encirclement Battle, and the First and Second Soviet Counteroffensives, 10 July – 24 August 1941. Philadelphia: Casemate. ISBN 9781906033729.
- Niehorster, Leo (2015b). "Red Army Organizations in 1941".
- Page, J. and Bean, Tim, Russian Tanks of World War II, Zenith Press
- Sharp, Charles, Soviet Armor Tactics in World War II: Red Army Armor Tactics from Individual Vehicle to Company from the Combat Regulations of 1944
- Sharp, Charles, Soviet Order of Battle in World War II Vol 1: The Deadly Beginning: Soviet Tank, Mechanized, Motorized Divisions and Tank Brigades of 1940–1942
- Zaloga, Steven & Ness, Leland The Red Army Handbook
- Axis History Forum discussion on Mech Corps
