= Batskelevich Cavalry Group =

- Active: 18 July 1941 -September 1941.
- Country: Soviet Union
- Branch: Cavalry
- Role: Breakthrough and Exploitation in Deep Operations
- Size: Group

Commanders
- Notable commanders: Colonel A.I. Bataskelevich

The Batskelevich Cavalry Group was a cavalry formation of the Red Army during World War II.

Formed on 18 July 1941 in the Western Front under the command of the 32nd Cavalry Division's commander.

This was the first of the Cavalry Groups formed during the war. The group operated as a raiding force on the flank and rear of the German 2nd Army and 2nd Panzer Corps. The group made several raids prior to the front stabilizing in August. The group was disbanded in September 1942.

== Composition ==
- 32nd Cavalry Division
- 43rd Cavalry Division
- 47th Cavalry Division

== See also ==
- Cavalry corps (Red Army)
