= 47th Cavalry Division =

- Active: 6 July 1941 – 10 November 1941
- Country: Soviet Union
- Branch: Cavalry
- Role: Breakthrough and Exploitation in Deep Operations
- Size: Division

The 47th Cavalry Division was one of the first cavalry divisions formed after the start of World War II. The unit was formed at Novocherkassk in the North Caucasus Military District from reservists and the cavalry depots in the district's cavalry training grounds.

== Combat service ==
The division was rushed to the front less than two weeks after being formed. It arrived in the 21st Army by the middle of July and was assigned to the Batskelevich Cavalry Group under the command of the 32nd Cavalry Division's commander. In July and August 1941 the group and the division raided into the rear areas and flanks of the German 2nd Army and 2nd Panzer Group south of Smolensk. The division was on the southern edge of the German offensive against the Western Front.

Assigned to the Southwestern Front reserves in October and November. The continuous fighting in October and November wore down all the units in the front and replacements had to be found for them. As a result, the division was disbanded on 10 November 1941 and the troops used to reinforce the 32nd Cavalry Division.

== Subordinate units ==
- 39th Cavalry Regiment
- 41st Cavalry Regiment
- 44th Cavalry Regiment

== See also ==
- List of Soviet cavalry divisions, 1917–45
