= 29th Mechanized Corps =

- Active: 1941
- Country: Soviet Union
- Branch: Red Army
- Type: Mechanized corps

Commanders
- Notable commanders: Mikhail Pavelkin

The 29th Mechanized Corps (Military Unit Number 8300) was a mechanized corps of the Red Army. Formed in March 1941 in the Transbaikal Military District, the corps was disbanded two months later.

== History ==
The 29th Mechanized Corps was formed in March 1941, part of the 17th Army in the Transbaikal Military District. The corps included the 57th and 61st Tank Divisions at Bayanterem and Tamtsakbulak, respectively, and the 82nd Motorized Division at Bayantümen. The two tank divisions were newly formed and the 82nd Motorized Division had been formed in 1940. The corps also included the 30th Motorcycle Regiment at Bayantümen. The corps was equipped with 1,011 tanks at its formation. It was commanded by Major General Mikhail Pavelkin. The corps was disbanded on 7 May. Its units became separate units in the 17th Army. The 57th Tank Division instead became part of the 5th Mechanised Corps and transferred to the Kiev Military District with it.
