= 71st Anti-Aircraft Artillery Division =

- Active: October 1943–c. 1950s
- Country: Soviet Union
- Branch: Red Army (later Soviet Army)
- Type: Anti-Aircraft Artillery
- Engagements: World War II
- Decorations: Order of Kutuzov, 2nd class
- Battle honours: Berlin

The 71st Anti-Aircraft Artillery Division (Russian: 71-я зенитная артиллерийская дивизия) was an anti-aircraft artillery division of the Soviet Union's Red Army (later the Soviet Army) during World War II and the early postwar period.

Formed in the Volga Military District in late 1943, the division was moved forward to the Kiev Military District in May 1944. It was not sent to the front until February 1945, fighting in the Siege of Breslau and the Berlin Offensive in the last weeks of the war. The division was disbanded by the end of the 1950s.

== World War II ==
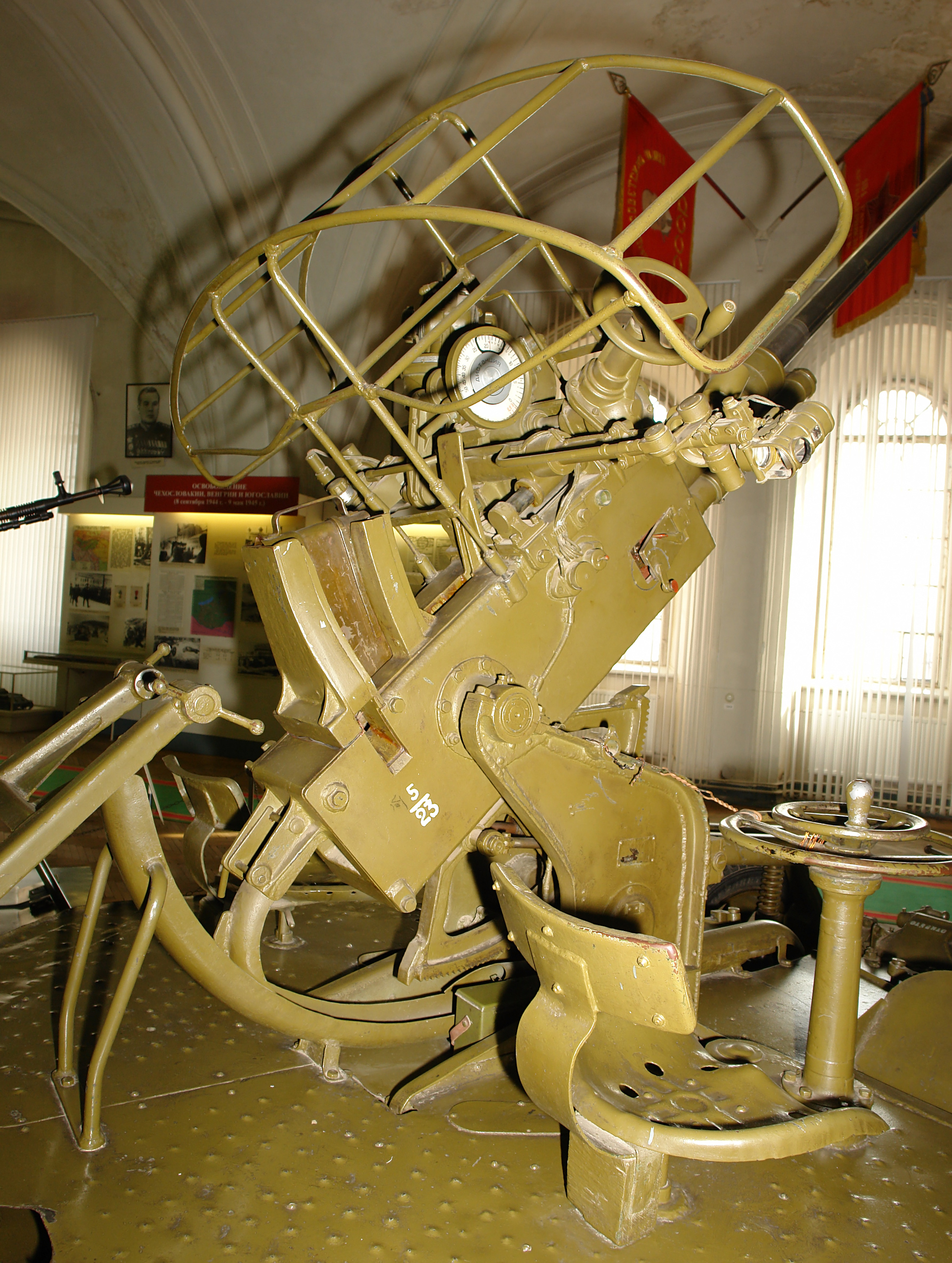
A 37 mm AA gun of the type used by the division during World War II

The division began forming at the Penza Anti-Aircraft Artillery Training Camp around 23 October 1943, when Colonel Grigory Novikov was appointed commander. It was part of the Volga Military District, and included the 1998th, 2002nd, 2006th, and 2010th Anti-Aircraft Artillery Regiments. In March 1944, the camp was relocated to Zhitomir. The division remained in the Volga Military District until May, when it transferred to the Kiev Military District. From 25 August, Colonel Grigory Svet served as division commander, leading it for the rest of the war.

The division remained in Kiev Military District until 25 February, when it was transferred to the 1st Ukrainian Front. The 71st, alongside the 173rd Fighter Aviation Regiment of the 56th Fighter Aviation Division and later the 10th Air Defense Corps, carried out the aerial blockade during the Siege of Breslau. In March the 71st was transferred to the 6th Army, but in April was directly subordinated to the front again. It fought in the Berlin Offensive from 24 April, receiving the Berlin honorific for its actions in the offensive. On 4 June, the division was awarded the Order of Kutuzov, 2nd class, for its role in the Siege of Breslau.

== Postwar ==
Postwar, the 71st became part of the Central Group of Forces. Svet continued to command until September, when he transferred to command the 69th Anti-Aircraft Artillery Division. The division was among those anti-aircraft artillery divisions disbanded without being converted into another unit by the end of the 1950s.
