= 26th Mechanized Corps =

- Active: 1941
- Country: Soviet Union
- Branch: Red Army
- Type: Mechanized corps

Commanders
- Notable commanders: Nikolai Kirichenko

The 26th Mechanized Corps (Military Unit Number 7476) was a Mechanized corps of the Red Army. The mechanized corps of the Red Army were reorganized after Operation Barbarossa, the German invasion of the Soviet Union. The corps was reorganized and disbanded before it saw action.

== History ==
=== Formation ===
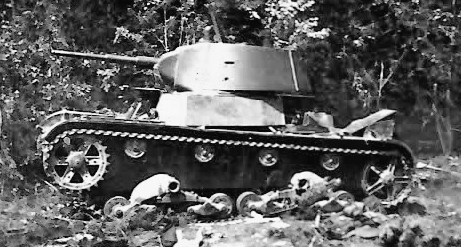
A destroyed T-26 of the type used by the corps

The 26th Mechanized Corps was formed in March 1941 in the North Caucasus Military District. The corps included the 52nd and 56th Tank Divisions, and the 103rd Motorized Division (the former 103rd Rifle Division). The corps headquarters and the 56th Tank Division were at Armavir, the 52nd Tank Division at Mineralnye Vody, and the 103rd Motorized Division at Voroshilovsk. The corps was commanded by Major General Nikolai Kirichenko. It became part of the 19th Army. On 1 June, the units of the corps were equipped with 86 BT tanks and T-26 tanks, and 15 T-37, T-38, and T-40 amphibious tanks.

=== World War II ===
On 22 June, Operation Barbarossa, the German invasion of the Soviet Union began. Between 28 and 29 June the corps was sent to the Kiev region with the 19th Army. The corps initially consisted of about 200 tanks and received reinforcements. It moved north with the 19th Army on 2 July. The corps was transferred to the 24th Army in the Dorogobuzh region southwest of Vyazma in early July. The corps was ordered to prepare fortified defensive lines northeast of Vyazma. On 8 July the corps was disbanded before it saw action as a result of the reorganization of Red Army mechanized forces. The 52nd and 56th Tank Divisions became the 101st and 102nd Tank Divisions. The 103rd Motorized Division became the 103rd Tank Division. All three divisions became part of the 24th Army's reserve. In mid-July, the Soviet General Staff decided to disband the mechanized corps as a result of combat experienced in the first weeks of the war, and planned to reform the corps headquarters as a rifle corps. On 16 July the 107th Rifle Division, 108th Rifle Division, 6th People's Militia Division, 19th Rifle Division, and the 444th Rifle Regiment, with artillery units, were ordered to become part of the rifle corps. The order was countermanded the next day and the rifle corps was never created.
