= 1st Mechanized Corps =

1st Mechanized Corps (1940–1946) 1st Mechanized Division (1946–1957) 19th Motor Rifle Division (1957–1965) 35th Motor Rifle Division (1965–1992)
- Active: 1940 – Aug 1941, 1942–1946
- Country: USSR (1940–1991); Russia (1991–1992)
- Branch: Red Army (1940–1946); Soviet Army (1946–1991); Russian Ground Forces (1991–1992)
- Role: Mechanized Corps (Soviet); Motor-Rifle
- Size: Corps; Division
- Engagements: World War II; Baltic Operation; Battle in Berlin

Commanders
- Notable commanders: Major General M. L. Cherniavsky

The 1st Mechanized Corps was a mechanized corps of the Red Army during World War II that formed twice.

In 1946, the Corps became the 1st Mechanized Division.

== World War II ==
=== First formation ===
The Leningrad Military District was directed to form the 1st Mechanized Corps from the 20th Heavy Tank Brigade, the 1st and 13th Light Tank Brigades, the 25th Cavalry Division, and the 163rd Rifle Division, which was converted to the 163rd Motorized Division beginning on July 1. The formation of the corps was to be completed by 30 June 1940, but the reorganization was interrupted by the Soviet invasion of Estonia. For the latter, the 13th Light Tank Brigade moved to Pskov by 13 June, assigned to the 8th Army.

The corps was initially formed in March 1940 attached to the Leningrad Military District, and held in reserve near the Pskov Fortified Region. It was under the command of Major General Mikhail Chernyavsky when the German Operation Barbarossa began in June 1941. It initially comprised the 1st and 3rd Tank Divisions, and the 168th Rifle Division.

The 3rd Tank Division of the corps was formed from the 13th Light Tank Brigade; the new division inherited the brigade's Order of the Red Banner. The brigade's 6th and 9th Tank Battalions were used to form the 5th Tank Regiment and the 13th and 15th Tank Battalions the 6th Tank Regiment. The period for the formation of the corps was lengthened on 23 June with the extension of the deadline for the completion of the process to 31 July. Despite these delays, the formation of the first new mechanized corps was completed by October and the 1st became one of the most well-manned and -equipped due to the number of units used to form it.

On 22 June 1941, 1st Mechanized Corps consisted of 31,439 men, 1,037 tanks, 239 armored cars, 148 artillery pieces, 146 mortars, 4,730 vehicles, 246 tractors, and 467 motorcycles; including lighter T-26, BT-7, and T-28 model tanks.

After the invasion began, the Leningrad Military District was renamed to the Northern Front and was overseen by Lieutenant General Markian M. Popov. The front fielded the 14th, 7th, and 23rd Armies, the 65th Rifle Corps and the Leningrad Military District forces, including the 2nd Division of NKVD troops. The 1st Mechanized Corps was heavily engaged in the first battles of Operation Barbarossa, particularly during the Baltic Operation (1941). On 29 June 1941, the 1st Mechanized Corps was ordered to reinforce new defenses anchored on the Velikaya River, near Ostrov, on the former Stalin Line after the spectacular advances by Georg-Hans Reinhardt's XLI Panzer Corps, which had crossed the Daugava River. However it was unable to hold the line. On 11 July 1941, Colonel Pavel Poluboiarov on the Northwestern Front reported that the 1st Mechanized Corps had at the present moment fewer than 100 tanks remaining. Pskov and Ostrov were captured within weeks. On 2 August 1941, Colonel Limarenko, Chief of Staff of the 1st Mechanized Corps reported that the Corps possessed no T-34 or KV-1s. When sent into action, only 20 were delivered after combat began. The 1st Mechanized Corps was disbanded in August 1941, although the 1st Tank Division remained in 14th Army.

=== Second formation ===
The Corps was formed a second time on the basis of the 27th Tank Corps on 8 September 1942 in Kalinin. It fought actively during the Second World War from 26 September—10 March 1943, from 9 July 1943—13 January 1944, from 7 June 1944—5 September 1944, and from 30 October 1944—9 May 1945. After the end of World War II, the Corps became part of the Group of Soviet Occupation Forces in Germany.

== Cold War ==
In 1946, the Corps became the 1st Mechanized Division. The division became the 19th Motor Rifle Division on 29 April 1957. It was located in the 1936 Olympic Village (de:Olympisches Dorf (Berlin)) (Dallgow-Döberitz barracks) and formed part of the 2nd Guards Tank Army. In June 1964, it was subordinated to the 20th Guards Army. On 1 January 1965, it became the 35th Motor Rifle Division. On 22 February 1968, the division was awarded the Order of the Red Banner. In May 1983, it relocated to Krampnitz. In May 1989, the 219th Tank Regiment was moved to the Soviet Union and disbanded. It was replaced by the 32nd Guards Tank Division's 69th Motor Rifle Regiment. During the Cold War, the 35th Motor Rifle Division was maintained at full strength. In December 1991, the division moved to Chebarkul and became part of the Volga–Urals Military District. The division was disbanded in April 1992.

== Bibliography ==
- Drig, Yevgeny (2005). Механизированные корпуса РККА в бою. История автобронетанковых войск Красной Армии в 1940–1941 годах [Red Army Mechanized Corps in battle: The history of the Red Army armored forces 1940–1941] (in Russian). Moscow: Transkniga. ISBN 5-170-24760-5.
- Feskov, V. I.; Kalashnikov, K. A.; Golikov, V. I. (2004). Советская Армия в годы «холодной войны» (1945-1991) [The Soviet Army during the Cold War (1945-1991)] (in Russian). Tomsk: Tomsk University Publishing House. ISBN 5751118197.
- Glantz, David (1998). Stumbling Colossus: The Red Army on the Eve of World War. Lawrence: University Press of Kansas. ISBN 0-7006-0879-6.
- Glantz, David (2002). The Battle for Leningrad: 1941-1944. Lawrence: University Press of Kansas. ISBN 0-7006-1208-4.
- Kalasnikov, K. A.; Dodonov, I. Y. (2019). Высший командный состав Вооружённых сил СССР в послевоенный период. Справочные материалы (1945—1975): Командный состав Сухопутных войск (армейское и дивизионное звенья) [The highest command staff of the Armed Forces of the USSR in the post-war period. Reference materials (1945-1975); Part One: The command staff of the Ground Forces (army and divisional levels).] (in Russian). Vol. 4. Ust-Kamenogorsk: Media-Alliance. ISBN 978-601-7887-31-5.
- Meltyukhov, Mikhail (2014). Прибалтийский плацдарм (1939-1940 гг.). Возвращение Советского Союза на берега Балтийского моря [Baltic Bridgehead (1939–1940): The Return of the Soviet Union to the Shores of the Baltic Sea] (in Russian). Moscow: Algoritm. ISBN 978-5-4438-0602-0.
- Raus, Erhard; Newton, Steven (2003). Panzer Operations : The Eastern Front Memoir of General Raus, 1941 - 1945 (1 ed.). Cambridge, Mass: Da Capo Press. ISBN 0-306-81247-9.
