= 30th Mechanized Corps =

- Active: 1941
- Country: Soviet Union
- Branch: Red Army
- Type: Mechanized corps
- Garrison/HQ: Monastyrische

Commanders
- Notable commanders: Vasily Golubovsky

The 30th Mechanized Corps (Military Unit Number 8354) was a mechanized corps of the Red Army. Formed in March 1941 in the Soviet Far East, the corps did not see action. It was disbanded in mid-July 1941 as part of the reorganization of Red Army mechanized forces.

== History ==
The corps was formed in March 1941 in the Far East as part of the Far Eastern Front. The 60th Tank Division formed in the Birobidzhan area and the rest of the corps was formed in Primorsky Krai. The 58th Tank Division headquarters was formed from the 48th Light Tank Brigade, which arrived in Monastyrische from Voroshilova. The 3rd Light Tank Brigade was transferred to free up barracks for the 58th Tank Division. The corps also included the 239th Motorized Division at Iman and the 29th Motorcycle Regiment at Lesozavodsk. The headquarters of the corps was at Monastyrische and it was commanded by Lieutenant General Vasily Golubovsky. Its chief of staff was Colonel Andrei Getman. The chief of artillery of the corps was Colonel Pyotr Kosenko. The corps had more than a thousand tanks, but none of these were T-34s or KVs. Most of the corps' tanks were T-26s and BT-7s. The corps was numerically stronger than other higher-numbered mechanized corps due to its location on the Soviet border.

In mid-July 1941 the corps headquarters was disbanded. The 58th Tank Division and 239th Motorized Division became part of the 1st Army. The 60th Tank Division became part of the 15th Army. The 29th Motorcycle Regiment became part of the 35th Army.
