= 14th Guards Airborne Division =

The 14th Guards Airborne Division was a Red Army airborne division during World War II, formed twice.

- First formation (23 Dec 1943–19 Jan 1944): became the 99th Guards Rifle Division within two months of formation
- Second formation (Sept 1944): became 114th Guards Rifle Division on 25 December 1944; then renamed 114th Guards Airborne Division postwar.
