= 46th Rifle Division =

Division of the Red Army

- Active: 1923–1964
- Country: Soviet Union
- Type: Infantry
- Size: Division

The 46th Rifle Division was a rifle division of the Red Army.

== History ==
The division was formed in 1923 as a territorial unit, assigned to the 14th Rifle Corps of the Ukrainian Military District. Based in Kiev, it included the 136th, 137th, and 138th Rifle Regiments. Its regiments received the honorifics Pre-Dnieper, Kiev, and Pereyaslavl, respectively, by 1930. Reorganized as a cadre unit in 1931, it became part of the Kiev Military District when the Ukrainian Military District was split on 17 May 1935. The division transferred to the Zhitomir Army Group of the Kiev Special Military District on 26 July 1938 during another reorganization.

The 46th was soon transferred to Irkutsk, assigned to the Transbaikal Military District. It was reorganized under peacetime tables of organization and equipment with an authorized strength of 6,000 personnel in April 1940. When Operation Barbarossa, the German invasion of the Soviet Union, began on 22 June 1941, the division was assigned to the 32nd Rifle Corps of the 16th Army of the Transbaikal Military District, and still stationed in Irkutsk. It was commanded by Major General Alexander Filatov at the time. Sent west, it was wiped out during the Battle of Smolensk in July.

The division was reformed at Ufa after July 1941, but was destroyed in the Volkhov Pocket during June 1942. It was again reformed from the 1st Rifle Division NKVD at Vaskelevo, and fought at Lutsk and Danzig. The 46th was part of the 2nd Shock Army of the 2nd Belorussian Front in May 1945. When the Group of Soviet Occupation Forces in Germany was formed in August 1945, the division was with the 109th Rifle Corps of the 2nd Shock Army.

In 1955, the division was reformed from the 272nd Rifle Division with the 13th Guards Rifle Corps at Kursk. It became the 46th Motor Rifle Division on 25 June 1957. On 17 November 1964 it became the 272nd Motor Rifle Division.
