= 28th Mechanized Corps =

- Active: 1941
- Country: Soviet Union
- Branch: Red Army
- Type: Mechanized corps
- Garrison/HQ: Yerevan

Commanders
- Notable commanders: Vasily Novikov

The 28th Mechanized Corps (Military Unit Number 7406) was a mechanized corps of the Red Army. Formed in March 1941 in Yerevan, the corps did not see combat and in late July became the 47th Army.

== History ==
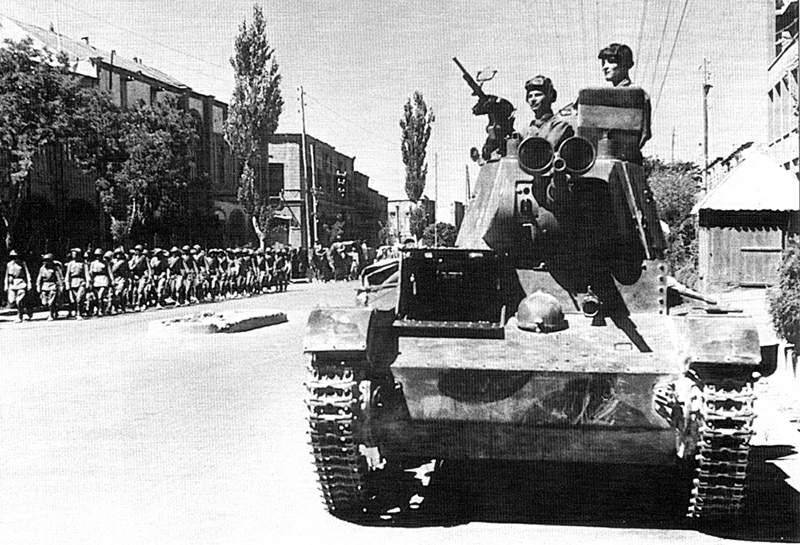
A T-26 of the 6th Tank Division

The 28th Mechanized Corps was formed in March 1941 in Yerevan, part of the Transcaucasian Military District. The corps included the previously formed 6th Tank Division at Vagharshapat, the 54th Tank Division at Leninakan, and the 236th Motorized Division at Ashtarak. The 54th Tank Division was reorganized from the 17th Light Tank Brigade. The 236th Motorized Division was formed from the 41st Light Tank Brigade. The corps was commanded by Major General Vasily Novikov. Its chief of staff was Kombrig Nikolai Trufanov.

On 22 June 1941, the corps had 869 tanks, including 131 flamethrower tanks. These were mostly T-26 tanks. The corps was numerically stronger than other higher-numbered mechanized corps due to its location on the Soviet border. The 47th Army was formed around the divisions of the corps on 1 August according to an order dated 26 July, under Novikov's command. The 236th Motorized Division became the 236th Rifle Division, without its tank regiment. The 47th Army fought in the Anglo-Soviet invasion of Iran in late August.
