= 216th Rifle Division =

216th Motorized Division (11 March 1941 – 19 September 1941) 216th Rifle Division (29 September 1941 – 7 July 1956)
- Active: 1941–1956
- Disbanded: 7 July 1956
- Country: Soviet Union
- Branch: Red Army
- Type: Infantry
- Size: Division
- Engagements: Battle of Uman

The 216th Rifle Division was a division of the Red Army and Soviet Ground Forces. It was the successor to a motorized division of that same number that was destroyed during the Battle of Uman in August 1941. It fought at Kharkov and in Karelia, Crimea, and Kurland.

== 216th Motorized Division ==
The division was formed in March 1941 at Uman in the Kiev Special Military District as the 216th Motorised Division, and was part of this District's 24th Mechanised Corps, along with the 45th and 49th Tank Division and the 17th Motorcycle Regiment in June. The division was under command of Col. Ashot Sarkisovich Sarkisyan for its entire existence. Once formed its order of battle was as follows:

- 647th Motorized Rifle Regiment
- 665th Motorized Rifle Regiment
- 134th Tank Regiment
- 656th Artillery Regiment
- 42nd Antitank Battalion
- 215th Antiaircraft Battalion
- 290th Reconnaissance Battalion
- 370th Light Engineering Battalion
- 590th Signal Battalion
- 214th Artillery Park Battalion
- 356th Medical/Sanitation Battalion
- 685th Motor Transport Battalion
- 160th Repair and Restoration Battalion
- 34th Regulatory Company
- 460th Chemical Defense (Anti-gas) Company
- 725th Field Postal Station
- 586th Field Office of the State Bank

When the German invasion began the division was at Starokostiantyniv along with the 49th Tanks, while 45th Tanks was stationed at Yarmolyntsi. The 216th had almost none of the elements of a motorized division. The 134th had no tanks at all; there were few trucks or tractors and there was also a general shortage of heavy weapons. There were no organized antitank or antiaircraft units. From the start of the war the Soviet command identified it as "essentially... a rifle division". It was therefore detached to Operational Group Lukin which was protecting a large Red Army supply base at Shepetivka.

=== Battle of Uman ===
On 22 June the Kiev Special Military District had been redesignated as Southwestern Front and by 1 July the 24th Mechanized had come under command of that Front's 26th Army and it was still under those commands ten days later. Shepetivka had been overrun by 1st Panzer Group by 7 and 24 July Mechanized was facing the IV Army Corps east of Volochysk. A week later it was attempting to hold along the northern reaches of the Southern Bug River west of Khmilnyk but 26th Army was already being outflanked to its north. Around 23 July the 24th Mechanized was counterattacking the 16th Panzer Division at Monastyryshche as it drove south behind 6th and 12th Armies of Southern Front; as of 1 August the 216th had been assigned to the latter commands. The two Armies were effectively trapped by now and organized resistance in the Uman pocket ended on 8 August. The 216th Motorized had been destroyed but it was not officially removed from the Red Army order of battle until 19 September.

== 216th Rifle Division ==
A new division was formed in Kharkov as the 216th Rifle Division which became the skeleton of the garrison of the city. The Front staff directed that the defenders of Kharkov should abandon the city on the night of 25 October 1941. However, the city garrison staff, under General I.I. Marshalkov, and the efforts of the 38th Army, also present, were not well coordinated. Thus the division received orders simultaneously from the city defense staff, and from the 38th army staff. As a result of the confusion, the Germans managed to seize one of the bridges into the city.

In April and May 1944 the division fought with the 10th Rifle Corps, 51st Army, in the Battle of the Crimea (1944). 51st Army was subsequently moved to 1st Baltic Front. Later on, on 6 April 1945 the 216th Rifle Division was one of the divisions in the encirclement around Königsberg, located at the northwest sector and part of the 124th Rifle Corps of the 43rd Army. The division to the right was the 208th Rifle Division, and to the left was the 153rd Rifle Division. They attacked German positions and broke through the second defense line. By May 1945 the division was with the 50th Army of the 3rd Belorussian Front.

The division was part of the Fourth Army in the Transcaucasian Military District until 1955, until it became the 34th Rifle Division at Baku. However under its new designation it disbanded on 7 July 1956.

== Sources ==
- Feskov, V.I.; Golikov, V.I.; Kalashnikov, K.A.; Slugin, S.A. (2013). Вооруженные силы СССР после Второй Мировой войны: от Красной Армии к Советской [The Armed Forces of the USSR after World War II: From the Red Army to the Soviet: Part 1 Land Forces] (in Russian). Tomsk: Scientific and Technical Literature Publishing. ISBN 9785895035306.
- Grylev, A. N. (1970). Перечень № 5. Стрелковых, горнострелковых, мотострелковых и моторизованных дивизии, входивших в состав Действующей армии в годы Великой Отечественной войны 1941-1945 гг [List (Perechen) No. 5: Rifle, Mountain Rifle, Motor Rifle and Motorized divisions, part of the active army during the Great Patriotic War 1941–1945] (in Russian). Moscow: Voenizdat., p. 206
