= 32nd Cavalry Division =

Cavalry division of the Soviet Union

- Active: March 1938 – 1945
- Country: Soviet Union
- Branch: Cavalry
- Role: Breakthrough and Exploitation in Deep Operations
- Size: Division

Commanders
- Notable commanders: Colonel A. I. Bataskelevich

The 32nd Cavalry Division was formed in 1938 in the Kiev Military District from the 1st Zaporozhe Cossack Cavalry Division.

== Wartime Service ==
=== Invasion of Poland ===
The division participated in the Invasion of Poland. It was assigned to the Ukrainian Front's Cavalry Group.

=== World War II ===
Assigned to the 9th Rifle Corps in the Crimea the division had been undergoing amphibious training before the war started. On 10 July 1941 the division left for Gomel, leaving its assigned tank regiment behind, and was assigned to the 21st Army. The division commander took command of one of the first 'Cavalry Groups' of the war. In July and August 1941 the group and the division raided into the rear areas and flanks of the German 2nd Army and 2nd Panzer Group south of Smolensk. During this raid the division conducted a successful saber-swinging cavalry charge when they caught a German rear-echelon unit by surprise and overran it in a mounted attack.

In October–November 1941 the group and division operated along the flanks of the German attack towards Tula. In December 1941 the division was assigned to the 5th Cavalry Corps in December 1941 before the Corps was redesignated as the 3rd Guards Cavalry Corps on 26 December 1941.

The division remained assigned to the 3rd Guards Cavalry Corps for the remainder of the war. On 10 November 1942 the division absorbed the remnants of the 47th Cavalry Division as replacements. In early 1943 the division upgraded to the new cavalry standards. The division received the 207th Tank Regiment in June 1943.

The division was disbanded in the summer of 1945.

== Subordinate units ==
=== 22 June 1941 ===
- 65th Cavalry Regiment
- 86th Cavalry Regiment
- 121st Cavalry Regiment
- 197th Cavalry Regiment
- 5th Tank Regiment (T-38 and T-40 tanks)

=== June 1943 ===
- 65th Cavalry Regiment
- 86th Cavalry Regiment
- 121st Cavalry Regiment
- 197th Cavalry Regiment
- 207th Tank Regiment

== See also ==
- Cavalry Divisions of the Soviet Union 1917–1945
