= 32nd Guards Tank Division =

Tank division of the Soviet military

9th Guards Airborne Division (15 December 1942 – 19 June 1945) 116th Guards Rifle Division (19 June 1945 – 1946) 14th Guards Mechanized Division (1946–1957) 14th Guards Motorized Rifle Division (1957–1982) 32nd Guards Tank Division (1982–1989)
- Active: 1942–1989
- Country: Soviet Union
- Branch: Red Army / Soviet Army
- Type: Airborne, Infantry, Mechanized, Tank
- Size: Division
- Engagements: World War II; Battle of Kursk; Chernigov-Poltava Offensive; Kirovograd Operation; Uman–Botoșani Offensive; Lvov-Sandomierz Offensive; Sandomierz-Silesian Offensive; Lower Silesian Offensive; Upper Silesian Offensive; Battle of Berlin; Prague Offensive
- Decorations: Order of the Red Banner; Order of Kutuzov, 2nd class; Order of Suvorov, 2nd class
- Battle honours: Poltava

The 32nd Guards Tank Division was a tank formation of the Soviet Army/Soviet Ground Forces. Its predecessor, the 9th Guards Airborne Division, was a Red Army Airborne division of World War II. On 19 June 1945, it became the 116th Guards Rifle Division. In 1946, it became the 14th Guards Mechanized Division. In 1957, it became the 14th Guards Motorized Rifle Division. In 1982, it became the 32nd Guards Tank Division, which was disbanded in June 1989.

== History ==
=== World War II ===
The 9th Guards Airborne Division was formed on 15 December 1942 in the Moscow Military District from the 204th and 211th Airborne Brigades and the 1st Maneuver Airborne Brigade of 1st Airborne Corps. In February 1943, it became part of the 1st Shock Army. Beginning on 12 March 1943, the division fought in the Staraya Russa Offensive Operation. After the end of the Starayarussa Operation, the division was transferred to Reserve of the Supreme High Command (Stavka reserve) and in May was transferred to the 5th Guards Army of the Steppe Front. During July and August, the 9th Guards Airborne fought in the Battle of Kursk. They were particularly distinguished during the defence of Prokhorovka, where they repulsed German counterattacks by the Leibstandarte. As part of the 33rd Guards Rifle Corps, the division participated in the Belgorod-Khar'kov Offensive Operation.

In September 1943, it fought in the Chernigov-Poltava Offensive. On 22 September, in conjunction with the 95th Rifle Division and the 84th Rifle Division, the division crossed the Vorskla River and stormed Poltava. For its participation in the capture of Poltava, the division was given the title "Poltava". At the end of September, the division captured Kremenchuk. On 6 December, the division participated in the capture of Oleksandriia.

On 22 March 1944, the 9th Guards Airborne crossed the Southern Bug in the area of Ivanovka. It participated in the capture of Pervomaisk and crossed the Dniester on the night of 13 April, capturing Grigoriopol. For their actions in the capture of Pervomaisk, the division was awarded the Order of the Red Banner. During the Lvov–Sandomierz Offensive, the division repulsed German counterattacks, although its commanding officer, Ivan Pichugin, was killed on 4 August, in the area of Mielec and defending the Sandomierz bridgehead. In the Sandomierz–Silesian Offensive, the 9th Guards Airborne broke through German defences and on 14 January 1945 crossed the Nida. On 21 January it captured Rosenberg and on 24 January crossed the Oder. For its actions in Poland, it was awarded the Order of Suvorov 2nd class on 19 February 1945.

During February and March, the 9th Guards Airborne participated in the Lower Silesian Offensive and the Upper Silesian Offensive. On 20 April, during the Berlin Offensive, the division stormed Spremberg. In early May, it repulsed a German counterattack near Schwepnitz. The 9th Guards Airborne ended the war in Prague. On 4 June, it was awarded the Order of Kutuzov 2nd class for its actions during the capture of Dresden.

=== Postwar ===
On 13 June, the 9th Guards Airborne Division became the 116th Guards Rifle Division. In 1946, it became the 14th Guards Mechanized Division. On 20 April 1957, it became the 14th Guards Motorized Rifle Division at Juterborg, part of the 18th Guards Army. The 236th Guards Motor Rifle Regiment transferred to the 82nd Motor Rifle Division in April 1958 and was replaced by that division's 69th Motor Rifle Regiment. In June 1964, the division became part of the 20th Guards Army. The division participated in Operation Danube in 1968 as part of the 1st Guards Tank Army . The 330th Tank Regiment inherited the honors of the 343rd Guards Tank Regiment in 1975 and became the 343rd Guards Tank Regiment. In 1976, the division became the first GSFG unit to receive the new T-64A tank. On 14 September 1982, it became the 32nd Guards Tank Division. Its 216th Guards Motor Rifle Regiment became the 287th Guards Tank Regiment and the 223rd Guards Motor Rifle Regiment became the 288th Guards Tank Regiment. On 28 August 1988, the 640th Separate Missile Battalion was disbanded and absorbed by the newly formed 464th Missile Brigade. In May 1989, the 69th Motor Rifle Regiment transferred to the 35th Motor Rifle Division. The 1009th Anti-Aircraft Missile Brigade was also transferred to the 47th Guards Tank Division. The division was disbanded in June 1989 after withdrawal from Jüterbog to Krivoy Rog.

== Commanders ==
- Colonel M.V. Grachev (10 December 1942 – 13 January 1943)
- Colonel Konstantin Nikolaevich Vindushin (13 January-19 March 1943)
- Major General Alexander Mikhailovich Sazonov (19 March 1943 – 6 March 1944)
- Major General Ivan Pichugin (20 March-6 August 1944)
- Colonel Fedor Afanasiev (12–30 August 1944)
- Colonel Pavel Shumeev (6 September 1944 – 1 May 1945)
- Colonel EM Golub (2 May-12 June 1945)

== Composition ==
- 23rd Guards Airborne Regiment
- 26th Guards Airborne Regiment
- 28th Guards Airborne Regiment
- 7th Guards Airborne Artillery Regiment
