= 24th Mechanized Corps =

- Active: 1941
- Country: Soviet Union
- Branch: Red Army
- Type: Mechanized corps
- Engagements: World War II: Battle of Uman

Commanders
- Notable commanders: Vladimir Chistyakov

The 24th Mechanized Corps (Military Unit Number 7161) was a mechanized corps of the Red Army, active from spring 1941 to late 1941. On June 22, 1941, at the beginning of Operation Barbarossa, it was located at Proskurov in the Kiev Special Military District.

The corps commander was Maj. Gen. Vladimir Chistyakov. Its chief of staff was Colonel Alexander Danilov, who died in the Uman Pocket. The corps' three divisions were seemingly destroyed at Uman in August 1941.

== Units ==
=== 45th Tank Division (Military Unit Number 1703) ===
Commander - Brigade Commander, with 08/12/41, Major General Mikhail Solomatin. Deputy Head of the Political Department - Battalion Commissar Vinogradov Vakhrouchev.

- 89 Tank Regiment - military unit number 1727
- 90 Tank Regiment - military unit number 1731
- 45 motorized infantry regiment - military unit number 1720
- 45 Howitzer Artillery Regiment - military unit number 1737
- Other units: (air defence divizion - military unit number 1717, intelligence battalion - military unit number 1705, pontoon battalion - military unit number 1737, separate communications battalion - military unit number 1709, medical sanitary battalion - military unit number 1812, motor transport battalion - military unit number 1802, repair and restoration battalion - military unit number 1807 regulation company - military unit number 1713, field bakery - military unit number 1824)

=== 49th Tank Division (Military Unit Number 9405) ===
Commander - Colonel Konstantin Shvetsov. Artillery commander - Colonel Nicanor Nikanorovich Lyubimov (died in captivity)

- 97 Tank Regiment - military unit number 9513
- 98 Tank Regiment - military unit number 9528
- 49 motorized infantry regiment - military unit number 9493
- 49 Howitzer Artillery Regiment - military unit number 9554
- other units (air defence divizion - military unit number 9483, intelligence battalion - military unit number 9421, pontoon battalion - military unit number 9578, separate communications battalion - military unit number 9442, medical sanitary battalion - military unit number 9606, motor transport battalion - military unit number 9586, repair and restoration battalion - military unit number 9597, regulation company - military unit number 9461, field bakery - military unit number 9622)

=== 216th Motorized Division (Military Unit Number 9250) ===
Commander - Colonel Ashot Sargsyan Sarkisovich. Head of engineering department - Ivan Lebedev.

- 647 motorized infantry regiment - military unit number 9262
- 665 motorized infantry regiment - military unit number 9273
- 134 Tank Regiment - military unit number 9282
- 656 Artillery Regiment - military unit number 9276
- 42 separate antitank battalion - military unit number 9319
- 215 separate anti-aircraft artillery battalion - military unit number 9306
- 290 Reconnaissance Battalion - military unit number 9291
- 370 easy-to- engineer battalion - military unit number 9302
- 590 separate communications battalion - military unit number 9297
- 214 artillery park division - military unit number 9348
- 356 medical and sanitary battalion - military unit number 9324
- 685 Motor Transport Battalion - military unit number 9357
- 160 repair and refurbishment battalion - military unit number 9342
- 34 company regulation - military unit number 9365
- 460 Field Bakery - military unit number 9329
- 725 Field postal station
- 586 Field ticket office of the State Bank

=== Corps troops ===
- 17 Motorcycle Regiment - military unit number 7145
- 551 separate communications battalion - military unit number 7372
- 81 separate motoinzhenerny battalion - military unit number 7431
- 124 separate Corps Air Squadron - military unit number 5601
