= 17th Mechanized Corps =

- Active: 1941
- Country: Soviet Union
- Branch: Red Army
- Type: Mechanized Corps
- Engagements: Battle of Białystok–Minsk

Commanders
- Notable commanders: Mikhail Petrovich Petrov

The 17th Mechanized Corps (Military Unit Number 9406) was a mechanised unit of the Red Army. Formed in March 1941, the corps was destroyed in the Battle of Białystok–Minsk and reduced in size to the 147th Tank Brigade.

== History ==
=== Formation ===
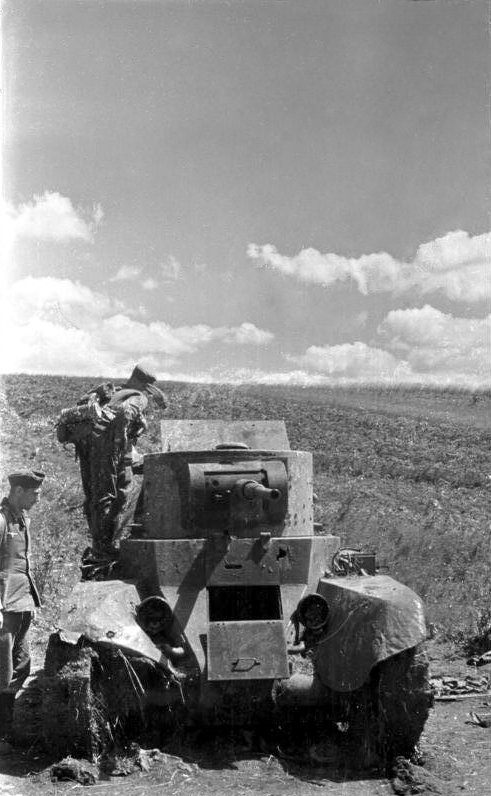
A destroyed BT-7 tank of the type used by the corps

The 17th Mechanized Corps was formed in March 1941 at Baranovichi under the command of Mikhail Petrovich Petrov. It was part of the Western Special Military District's reserve at Slonim. The corps included the 27th and 36th Tank Divisions, and the 209th Motorized Division. The 17th Mechanized Corps was a cadre-strength formation equipped with only 36 tanks, which included 24 BT tanks, a T-26 tank, and eleven T-37, T-38, and T-40 amphibious tanks.

=== Battle of Białystok–Minsk ===
Following the German invasion of the Soviet Union, the 17th Mechanized corps fought in the Battle of Białystok–Minsk. The corps was initially stationed in the rear but was moved forward to Baranovichi to stop the German advance. On 26 June it fought in defensive battles around Baranovichi, Stowbtsy, and Minsk. Its positions were broken through by the German XLVII Army Corps (Motorized). The outnumbered 17th Mechanized Corps was unable to offer much resistance to the attack and its remnants retreated eastwards to the Berezina, where they linked up with other Soviet units. By 3 July it was still mostly fighting on the western bank of the Dnieper. It suffered heavy losses in the fighting and on 5 July was allocated to the 21st Army after being ordered to Babruysk on the previous day.

On 7 July the corps' strength returns (lists of equipment) showed no armored vehicles. On 14 July the 16th Army was ordered to attack south towards Gorki alongside the 17th Mechanized Corps to destroy the German advance troops. The corps increased its resistance as it retreated, fighting against the German 10th Panzer Division as it advanced towards Pochinok on 16 July. On 18 July, the 16th Army was again ordered to attack south towards Gorki with the corps. On 21 July the corps ordered to withdraw to the Sukhinichi area with 4th Army. On 24 July it was regrouping from Yartsevo to support the 16th Army with a strength of 1,600, according to Western Front commander Semyon Timoshenko's situation report on that day. The corps became the 147th Tank Brigade on 1 August. Its 27th and 36th Tank Divisions were disbanded on the same date.
