= 1st Rifle Division NKVD =

- Active: 22 August 1941 – 9 August 1942
- Country: Soviet Union
- Branch: Soviet Army
- Type: Military and Internal Police
- Role: Policing and Border Patrol
- Size: Division
- Part of: Leiningrad Front, Eight Army, Neva Operations Group, Leningrad Front

The 1st Rifle Division NKVD was a division of the NKVD of the Soviet Union during World War II.

== History ==
The 1st Rifle Division NKVD was formed in August 1941 from the 3rd, 7th, 33rd and 102nd Border Guard Detachments and the 7th and 33rd NKVD Rifle Regiments. In December 1941 the division was then assigned to the 8th Army where it remained until February 1942 when it moved back to the Neva Operational Group as part of the Leningrad Front. Later that year in August the division was transferred to the Red Army and redesignated as the 46th Rifle Division.

== Organization at beginning ==
Organization of the "division" before it was actually considered a division sized unit.:

- Headquarters
- 3rd NKVD Rifle Regiment (Former 3 Border Guards)
- 7th NKVD Rifle Regiment (Former 7 NKVD Regiment)
- 33rd NKVD Rifle Regiment (Former 33 NKVD Regiment)
- 102nd NKVD Rifle Regiment (Former 102 Border Guards)
- 93rd Light Artillery Regiment (Attached during Winter War)

== Organization during War ==
When the war started the division was de-organized and re-organized as a rifle division within the army. It was then known (in the army) as the "46th (Dzerzhinsky) Rifle Division): see for further information. The structure when it entered the army:

- Headquarters
- 176th Rifle Regiment
- 314th Rifle Regiment
- 340th Rifle Regiment
- 393rd Light Artillery Regiment
- 60th Separate Anti-Tank Company
- 49th Reconnaissance Company
- 40th Engineer Battalion
- 353rd Signal Battalion
- 36th Medical Battalion
- 63rd Separate Chemical Defense Company
- 138th Motor Transport Company
- 299th Field Bakery
- 68th Divisional Veterinary Hospital
- 937th Field Post Station
- 1134th Field Tick Office of the State Bank
