= 69th Anti-Aircraft Artillery Division =

- Active: October 1943–1946
- Country: Soviet Union
- Branch: Red Army (later Soviet Army)
- Type: Anti-Aircraft Artillery
- Engagements: World War II
- Decorations: Order of Bogdan Khmelnitsky 2nd class
- Battle honours: Dresden

The 69th Anti-Aircraft Artillery Division (Russian: 69-я зенитная артиллерийская дивизия) was an anti-aircraft artillery division of the Soviet Union's Red Army (later the Soviet Army) during World War II and the early postwar period.

Formed in the Volga Military District in late 1943, the division fought with the 3rd Guards Army from May 1944 to the end of the war. Postwar, it was reduced to a brigade which eventually became the 2nd Anti-Aircraft Missile Brigade. The 2nd Brigade served in the Turkestan Military District during the Cold War and was transferred to Turkmenistan after the Dissolution of the Soviet Union.

== World War II ==
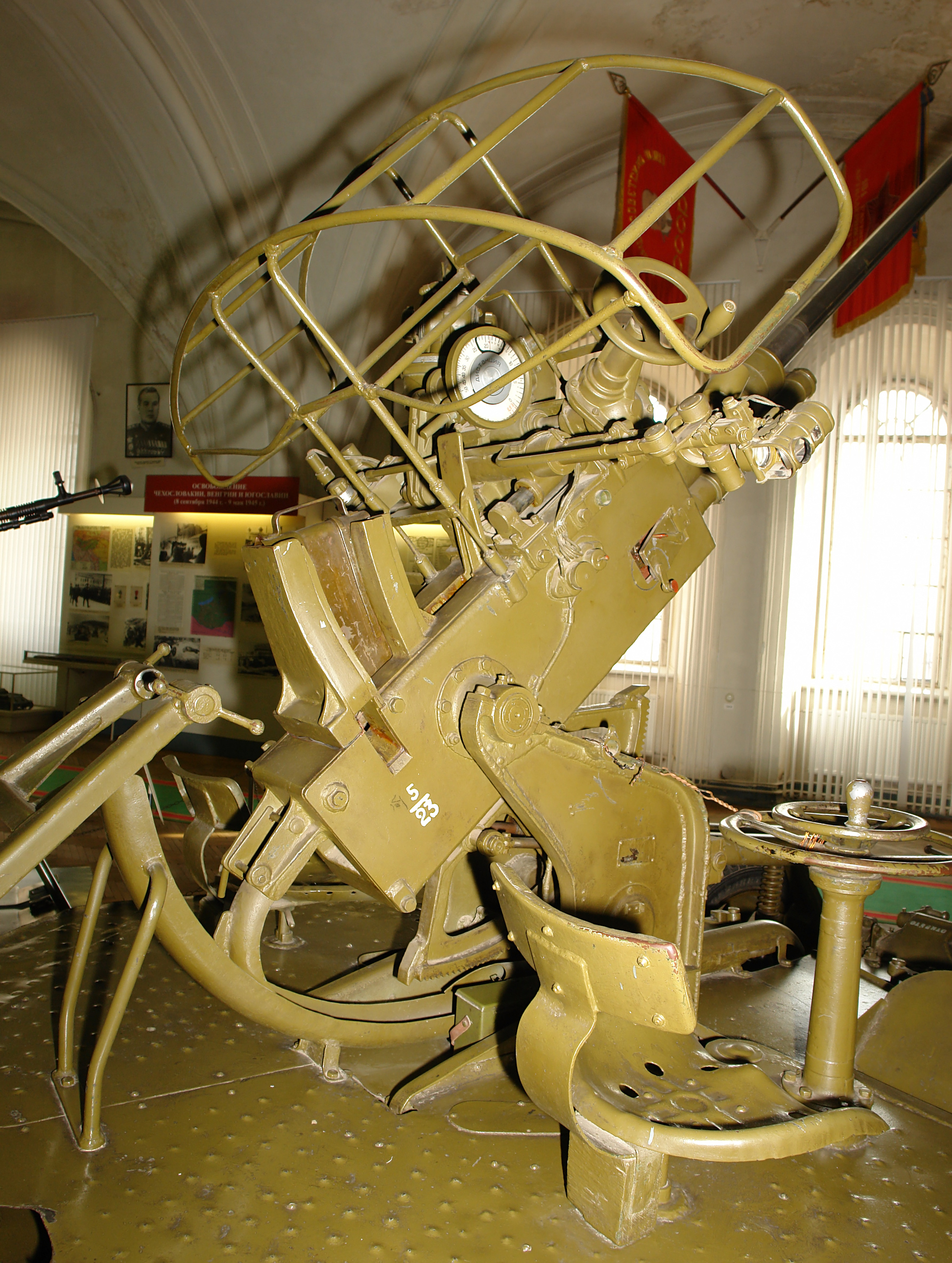
A 37 mm AA gun of the type used by the division during World War II

The division began forming around 14 October 1943, when Lieutenant Colonel (promoted to Colonel 17 November) Ivan Palshin was appointed commander; he would command the division for the rest of the war. It was part of the Volga Military District, and included the 1996th, 2000th, 2004th, and 2008th Anti-Aircraft Artillery Regiments.

Until April 1944, the division formed in Penza. In May, it was transferred to the 1st Ukrainian Front's 3rd Guards Army, with which it served for the rest of the war. As part of the army, it fought in the Lvov–Sandomierz Offensive, the Sandomierz–Silesian Offensive, the Lower Silesian Offensive, the Berlin Offensive, and the Prague Offensive. For helping to capture Dresden during the Prague Offensive on 8 May 1945, the division received the city's name as an honorific. For its actions in the Berlin Offensive, the division was awarded the Order of Bogdan Khmelnitsky, 2nd class, on 4 June.

== Postwar ==
In September 1945, Colonel Grigory Svet took command of the division. In July 1946 he took command of the 229th Dresden Anti-Aircraft Artillery Brigade of the Odessa Military District in Sarata. Svet continued to command the brigade until January 1947.

Feskov et al 2013 states that the brigade became the 229th Anti-Aircraft Brigade in 1946 and was subsequently renumbered as the 2nd. It later became part of the Turkestan Military District and, as the 2nd Anti-Aircraft Missile Brigade (equipped with Surface-to-air missiles), included the 1091st, 1092nd, and 1093rd Separate Anti-Aircraft Missile Battalions. According to Michael Holm's data, the 229th became the 502nd Anti-Aircraft Missile Regiment in 1960 and was stationed at Bikrova in Ashgabat before being redesignated as the 2nd Brigade in 1971. Between December 1979 and 1 March 1980 it was deployed in Kabul during the Soviet–Afghan War. After the dissolution of the Soviet Union the unit was taken over by Turkmenistan. It was equipped with the S-75 Dvina until 1971 and the 2K11 Krug after 1971.
