= Operation Uranus Soviet order of battle =

1942 counteroffensive in Stalingrad

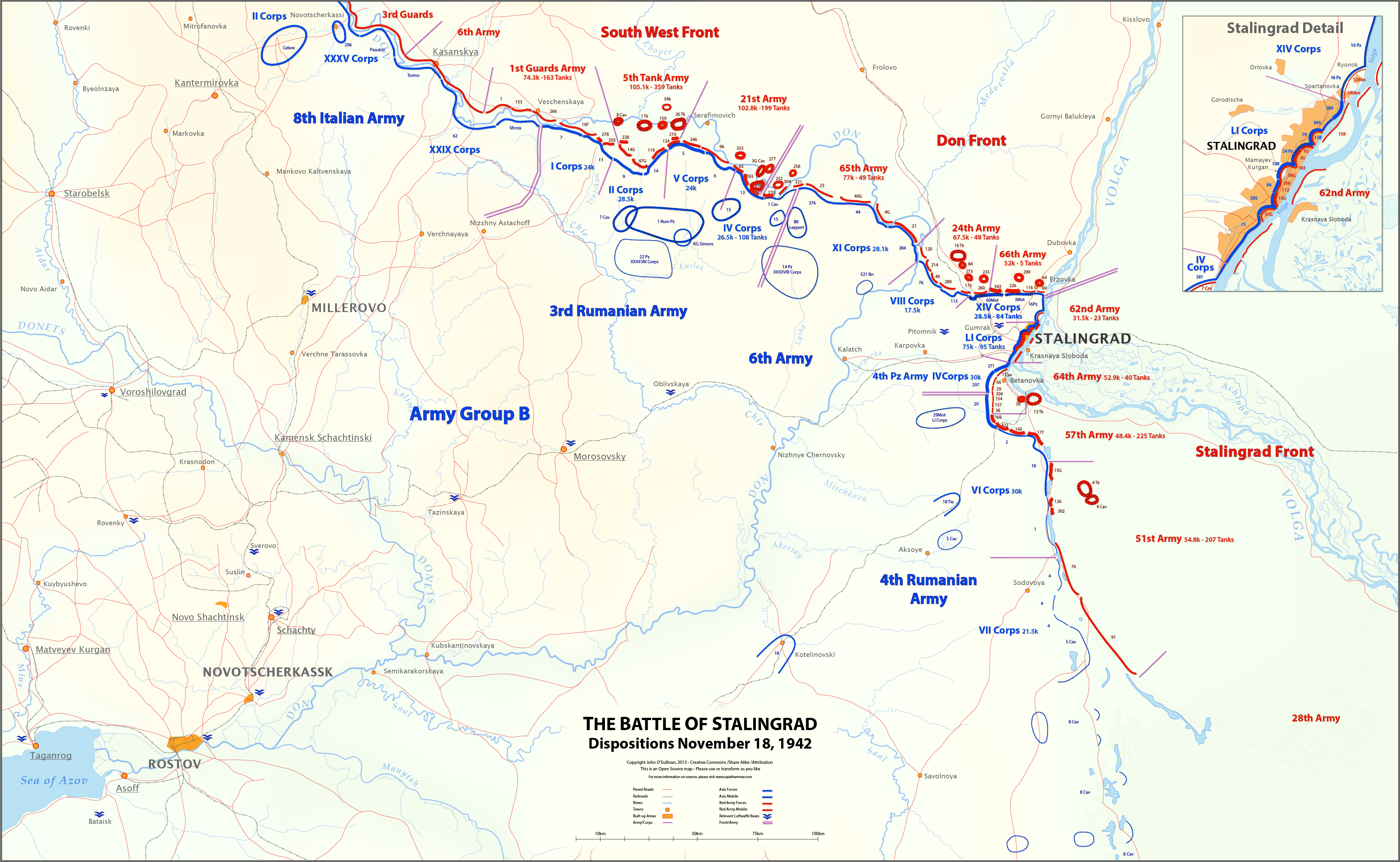
Situation on 18 November 1942

The Soviet order of battle for Operation Uranus details the combat units of the Soviet forces that fought in Operation Uranus, the Soviet strategic counteroffensive that led to the encirclement of the German troops in Stalingrad. The order of battle lists units present on 19 November 1942, the day the operation began, from north to south.

== High command ==
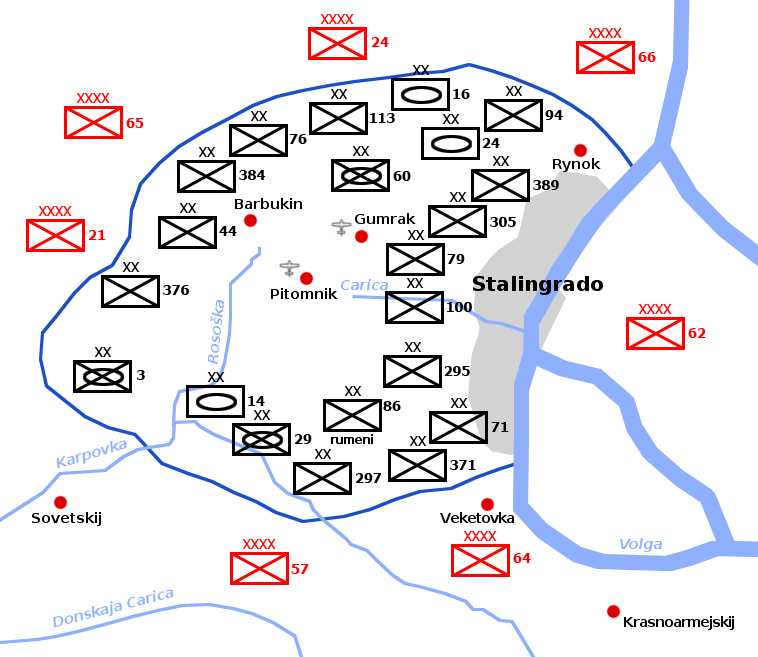
Map of the Stalingrad pocket, following Operation Uranus, showing all Axis Divisions and some Soviet Field Armies

=== Stavka representatives ===
- Army General G.K. Zhukov
- Colonel-General of Artillery N.N. Voronov
- Colonel-General A.M. Vasilevsky

== Voronezh Front ==
The Voronezh Front was commanded by Colonel General Filipp Golikov and included four field armies. Its massed armor component was the 25th Tank Corps. Air support was provided by the single division and regiment from 2nd Air Army that were kept under front control during the operation while the rest of the air army was placed under Southwestern Front control.

- 38th Army (Lieutenant General Nikandr Chibisov)
  - 161st Rifle Division
  - 167th Rifle Division
  - 237th Rifle Division
  - 240th Rifle Division
  - 340th Rifle Division
  - 104th Rifle Brigade
  - 248th Rifle Brigade
  - 7th Separate Destroyer Brigade
  - 96th Tank Brigade
  - 150th Tank Brigade
- 60th Army (Colonel General Ivan Chernyakhovsky)
  - 107th Rifle Division
  - 121st Rifle Division
  - 232nd Rifle Division
  - 303rd Rifle Division
  - 305th Rifle Division
  - 14th Separate Destroyer Brigade
  - 180th Tank Brigade
  - 475th Separate Tank Battalion
  - 476th Separate Tank Battalion
- 40th Army (Colonel General Kirill Moskalenko)
  - 100th Rifle Division
  - 141st Rifle Division
  - 206th Rifle Division
  - 8th Separate Destroyer Brigade
  - 16th Separate Destroyer Brigade
  - 14th Tank Brigade
  - 44th Separate Armored Train Battalion
- 6th Army (Lieutenant General Fyodor Kharitonov)
  - 25th Guards Rifle Division
  - 127th Rifle Division
  - 160th Rifle Division
  - 219th Rifle Division
  - 270th Rifle Division
  - 309th Rifle Division
  - 1st Destroyer Division
  - 1st Destroyer Brigade
  - 2nd Destroyer Brigade
  - 6th Separate Destroyer Brigade
  - 10th Separate Destroyer Brigade
  - 115th Tank Brigade
  - 116th Tank Brigade
  - 26th Separate Armored Train Battalion
  - 34th Separate Armored Train Battalion
- Elements of 2nd Air Army under front control
  - 244th Bomber Aviation Division
  - 878th Mixed Aviation Regiment
- Front forces
  - 253rd Rifle Brigade
  - 25th Tank Corps (Major General of Tank Forces Pyotr Pavlov)
    - 111th Tank Brigade
    - 162nd Tank Brigade
    - 175th Tank Brigade
    - 16th Motor Rifle Brigade
  - 86th Tank Brigade
  - 53rd Separate Motorcycle Battalion

== Southwestern Front ==
The Southwestern Front, commanded by Colonel General Nikolai Vatutin, included two field armies. Its armored striking force was the 5th Tank Army. Air support for the front was provided by the entire 17th Air Army and the majority of the 2nd Air Army.

- 1st Guards Army (Lieutenant General Dmitry Lelyushenko)
  - 1st Rifle Division
  - 153rd Rifle Division
  - 197th Rifle Division
  - 203rd Rifle Division
  - 266th Rifle Division
  - 278th Rifle Division
  - 1st Guards Mechanized Corps (Major General Ivan Russiyanov)
    - 1st Guards Mechanized Brigade
    - 2nd Guards Mechanized Brigade
    - 3rd Guards Mechanized Brigade
  - 22nd Separate Motor Rifle Brigade
- 5th Tank Army (Major General Prokofy Romanenko)
  - 14th Guards Rifle Division
  - 47th Guards Rifle Division
  - 50th Guards Rifle Division
  - 119th Rifle Division
  - 159th Rifle Division
  - 346th Rifle Division
  - 1st Tank Corps (Major General of Tank Forces Vasily Butkov)
    - 89th Tank Brigade
    - 117th Tank Brigade
    - 159th Tank Brigade
    - 44th Motor Rifle Brigade
  - 26th Tank Corps (Major General of Tank Forces Aleksey Rodin)
    - 19th Tank Brigade
    - 157th Tank Brigade
    - 216th Tank Brigade
    - 14th Motor Rifle Brigade
  - 8th Cavalry Corps (Major General Mikhail Borisov)
    - 21st Cavalry Division
    - 55th Cavalry Division
    - 112th Cavalry Division
  - 8th Guards Tank Brigade
  - 8th Motorcycle Regiment
  - 510th and 511th Tank Battalions
- 21st Army (Lieutenant General Ivan Chistyakov)
  - 63rd Rifle Division
  - 76th Rifle Division
  - 96th Rifle Division
  - 277th Rifle Division
  - 293rd Rifle Division
  - 333rd Rifle Division
  - 4th Tank Corps (Major General of Tank Forces Andrey Kravchenko)
    - 45th Tank Brigade
    - 69th Tank Brigade
    - 102nd Tank Brigade
    - 4th Motor Rifle Brigade
  - 3rd Guards Cavalry Corps (Major General Issa Pliyev)
    - 5th Guards Cavalry Division
    - 6th Guards Cavalry Division
    - 32nd Cavalry Division
  - 5th Separate Destroyer Brigade
  - 1st, 21st, 60th and 99th Separate Anti-Tank Rifle Battalions
  - 1st, 2nd, and 4th Guards Separate Tank Regiments
- 17th Air Army (Major General of Aviation Stepan Krasovsky)
  - 1st Mixed Aviation Corps (Major General of Aviation Vladimir Shevchenko)
  - 267th Assault Aviation Division
  - 288th Fighter Aviation Division
  - 221st Bomber Aviation Division
  - 262nd Night Bomber Aviation Division
  - 282nd Fighter Aviation Division
  - 208th Assault Aviation Regiment
  - 637th Assault Aviation Regiment
  - 10th Long-Range Reconnaissance Aviation Squadron
  - 331st Separate Bomber Aviation Squadron
- 2nd Air Army (Major General of Aviation Konstantin Smirnov)
  - 205th Fighter Aviation Division
  - 207th Fighter Aviation Division
  - 208th Fighter-Bomber Aviation Division
  - 227th Assault Aviation Division
  - 50th Reconnaissance Aviation Regiment
  - 324th Long-Range Reconnaissance Aviation Squadron

== Don Front ==
Colonel General Konstantin Rokossovsky's Don Front included the following units:

- 24th Army (Lieutenant General Ivan Galanin)
  - 49th Rifle Division
  - 84th Rifle Division
  - 120th Rifle Division
  - 173rd Rifle Division
  - 214th Rifle Division
  - 233rd Rifle Division
  - 260th Rifle Division
  - 273rd Rifle Division
  - 298th Rifle Division
  - 54th Fortified Region
  - 58th and 61st Separate Anti-Tank Rifle Battalions
  - 16th Tank Corps (Major General of Tank Forces Aleksey Maslov)
    - 107th Tank Brigade
    - 109th Tank Brigade
    - 164th Tank Brigade
    - 16th Motor Rifle Brigade
  - 10th Tank Brigade
  - 134th, 224th, and 229th Separate Armored Car Battalions
- 65th Army (Lieutenant General Pavel Batov)
  - 4th Guards Rifle Division
  - 27th Guards Rifle Division
  - 40th Guards Rifle Division
  - 23rd Rifle Division
  - 24th Rifle Division
  - 252nd Rifle Division
  - 258th Rifle Division
  - 304th Rifle Division
  - 321st Rifle Division
  - 59th and 64th Separate Anti-Tank Rifle Battalions
  - 91st Tank Brigade
  - 121st Tank Brigade
- 66th Army (Lieutenant General Aleksey Zhadov)
  - 64th Rifle Division
  - 99th Rifle Division
  - 116th Rifle Division
  - 226th Rifle Division
  - 299th Rifle Division
  - 343rd Rifle Division
  - 63rd Separate Anti-Tank Rifle Battalion
  - 58th Tank Brigade
- 16th Air Army (Major General of Aviation Sergey Rudenko)
  - 220th Fighter Aviation Division
  - 283rd Fighter Aviation Division
  - 228th Assault Aviation Division
  - 291st Assault Aviation Division
  - 271st Fighter-Bomber Aviation Division
  - 10th Guards Bomber Aviation Regiment
  - 325th Reconnaissance Aviation Squadron
- 159th Fortified Region
- 65th, 66th, 97th, 98th, 99th, 100th, 101st, and 102nd Separate Anti-Tank Rifle Battalions
- 64th Tank Brigade
- 148th Tank Brigade
- 39th, 40th and 377th Antiaircraft Armored Train Battalions

== Stalingrad Front ==
The Stalingrad Front, under the command of Colonel General Andrey Yeryomenko, assisted by Political Officer Nikita Khrushchev, included the following units:

- 62nd Army (Lieutenant General Vasily Chuikov)
  - 13th Guards Rifle Division
  - 37th Guards Rifle Division
  - 39th Guards Rifle Division
  - 45th Rifle Division
  - 95th Rifle Division
  - 112th Rifle Division
  - 138th Rifle Division
  - 193rd Rifle Division
  - 308th Rifle Division
  - 42nd Rifle Brigade
  - 92nd Rifle Brigade
  - 115th Rifle Brigade
  - 124th Rifle Brigade
  - 149th Rifle Brigade
  - 160th Rifle Brigade
  - 84th Tank Brigade
  - 506th Separate Tank Battalion from the 235th Tank Brigade
- 64th Army (Lieutenant General Mikhail Shumilov)
  - 7th Rifle Corps (Major General Sergey Goryachev)
    - 93rd Rifle Brigade
    - 96th Rifle Brigade
    - 97th Rifle Brigade
  - 36th Guards Rifle Division
  - 29th Rifle Division
  - 38th Rifle Division
  - 157th Rifle Division
  - 204th Rifle Division
  - 66th Naval Rifle Brigade
  - 154th Naval Rifle Brigade
  - 20th Destroyer Brigade
  - Composite Student Regiment of the Vinnitsa Infantry School
  - 13th Tank Brigade
  - 56th Tank Brigade
  - 28th Separate Armored Train Battalion
- 51st Army (Major General Nikolay Trufanov)
  - 15th Guards Rifle Division
  - 91st Rifle Division
  - 126th Rifle Division
  - 302nd Rifle Division
  - 4th Mechanised Corps (Major General of Tank Forces Vasily Volsky)
    - 36th Mechanized Brigade
    - 59th Mechanized Brigade
    - 60th Mechanized Brigade
    - 55th and 158th Tank Regiments
  - 4th Cavalry Corps (Lieutenant General Timofey Shapkin)
    - 61st Cavalry Division
    - 81st Cavalry Division
  - 76th Fortified Region
  - 38th Separate Motor Rifle Brigade
  - 254th Tank Brigade
- 57th Army (Lieutenant General Fyodor Tolbukhin)
  - 169th Rifle Division
  - 422nd Rifle Division
  - 143rd Rifle Brigade
  - 45th, 172nd, 177th Separate Machine Gun Artillery Battalions from the 76th Fortified Region
  - 13th Tank Corps (Major General of Tank Forces Trofim Tanaschishin)
    - 17th Mechanized Brigade
    - 61st Mechanized Brigade
    - 62nd Mechanized Brigade
  - 90th Tank Brigade
  - 235th Tank Brigade
  - 156th Separate Motorcycle Battalion
- 28th Army (Lieutenant General Vasily Gerasimenko)
  - 34th Guards Rifle Division
  - 248th Rifle Division
  - 52nd Rifle Brigade
  - 152nd Rifle Brigade
  - 159th Rifle Brigade
  - 6th Guards Tank Brigade
  - 565th Separate Tank Battalion
  - 35th Separate Armored Car Battalion
  - 30th, 33rd and 46th Separate Armored Train Battalions
- 8th Air Army (Major General of Aviation Timofey Khryukin)
  - 2nd Mixed Aviation Corps (Major General of Aviation Ivan Yeryomenko)
    - 201st Fighter Aviation Division
    - 235th Fighter Aviation Division
    - 214th Assault Aviation Division
  - 206th Assault Aviation Division
  - 226th Mixed Aviation Division
  - 289th Mixed Aviation Division
  - 270th Bomber Aviation Division
  - 272nd Fighter-Bomber Aviation Division
  - 268th Fighter Aviation Division
  - 287th Fighter Aviation Division
  - 8th Reconnaissance Aviation Regiment
  - 23rd, 282nd, 633rd, 655th and 932nd Mixed Aviation Regiments
  - 678th Transport Aviation Regiment
  - 31st and 32nd Corrective Aviation Squadrons
  - 459th Anti-Aircraft Artillery Regiment
- Stalingrad Air Defense Corps Region (Colonel Yefim Raynin)
  - 73rd Guards and 748th, 1077th, 1079th, 1080th, 1082nd, and 1083rd Anti-Aircraft Artillery Regiments
  - 82nd, 106th, 188th, and 267th Anti-Aircraft Artillery Battalions
  - 72nd, 122nd, 126th, 132nd, 137th, 141st, 142nd and 181st Separate Armored Trains (Anti-Aircraft)
  - 102nd PVO Fighter Aviation Division
- Volga Military Flotilla (Vice Admiral D. D. Rogachev)
  - 1st and 2nd Brigades of River Ships
  - Separate Armored Trawlers
- Front forces
  - 300th Rifle Division
  - 77th Fortified Region
  - 115th Fortified Region
  - 156th Fortified Region
  - 85th Tank Brigade
  - 35th and 166th Separate Tank Regiments

== Bibliography ==
- Beevor, Antony (1998). Stalingrad. Viking, London. ISBN 978-0-14-103240-5.
- Glantz, David M. (2014). Companion to Endgame at Stalingrad. University Press of Kansas. ISBN 9780700619566.
