= 61st Cavalry Division (Soviet Union) =

61st Cavalry Division (September 1941 – 20 May 1943)
- Col. A.V. Stavenkov after promotion to Major General.
- Active: 1941–1943
- Country: Soviet Union
- Branch: Red Army
- Type: Division
- Role: Cavalry
- Engagements: Battle of Stalingrad; Operation Uranus; Operation Winter Storm

Commanders
- Notable commanders: Col. N. G. Gadalin; Col. A. V. Stavenkov

The 61st Cavalry Division was a cavalry division of the Red Army that served in the first years of the Great Patriotic War. It was formed in September – October, 1941, and saw its first actions to the south of Stalingrad during the German siege of that city in the autumn of 1942. When the Soviet counteroffensive, Operation Uranus, began in November the 61st formed a significant part of the mobile forces of its 51st Army. After the positions of Romanian 4th Army were broken through the division took part in the exploitation to the southwest, but became overextended and vulnerable to the mobile German reinforcements arriving to attempt a breakthrough to their Sixth Army. The 61st suffered such severe losses that it had to be withdrawn to the reserves in December, and was later disbanded.

== Formation ==
The 61st Cavalry Division began forming in September, 1941 in the Central Asia Military District. It was mostly recruited from men of several Central Asian nationalities. It received its first commanding officer, Colonel Nikolai Gadalin, on September 25.

When formed, by the middle of the next month, its basic order of battle was as follows:

- 213th Cavalry Regiment
- 219th Cavalry Regiment
- 222nd Cavalry Regiment
- 13th Horse Artillery Battalion

In November the division was assigned to 4th Cavalry Corps, and it would remain in that Corps as long as they both existed. The 3rd formation of this Corps had been serving in the Anglo-Soviet invasion of Iran; following this its divisions were transferred to the occupation force while the headquarters and corps assets returned to Central Asia Military District. It was then assigned three new divisions: the 61st, 63rd and 81st Cavalry. In May, 1942, the division came under the command of Colonel Vasily Baumshtein, then, in June, was handed over to Colonel Anatolii Stavenkov, who would remain in command until the end of February, 1943.

The division crossed the Caspian Sea by ship to Astrakhan. At Olya the ships were unloaded by barges. 4th Cavalry Corps, which by now consisted of only the 61st and 81st Divisions, was assigned to 51st Army in Southwestern Front, south of Stalingrad, in October, 1942. In orders issued by Gen. G.K. Zhukov on October 15 to the front commander, Gen. A.I. Yeryomenko, the latter was to:

"Concentrate 61st Cavalry Division in the Solodnikov region and 81st Cavalry Division in the Chernyi Yar region to protect the crossings over the Volga River."

This attempt to relieve 62nd Army, along with several others in October and early November, had no success.

== Operation Uranus ==
At the start of the decisive Soviet counteroffensive on November 19 the 61st was part of the 51st Army mobile group that exploited into the breakthrough of the Romanian Army lines towards the southwest. This mobile group had the 4th Mechanized Corps in the lead, with the 4th Cavalry Corps guarding its left flank. 4th Mechanized ran into trouble from Romanian guns and mechanical breakdowns, so the cavalry was unable to join the exploitation until 2200 hrs. on November 20. Once they did so, they followed in the wake of the tanks to Plodovitoe. At this point, the 61st diverged to liberate the town of Abganerovo, 18 km southwest. The town fell to the 61st, assisted by elements of 4th Mechanized, on the following day, during which time the two cavalry divisions reportedly captured 5,000 Romanian troops between them. While the 81st moved southwest towards Aksai, the 61st was directed southward west of Lake Barmantsak to reach the rear of the Romanian 4th Infantry Division, which was holding up the advance of 91st Rifle Division on 51st Army's left wing. The Soviet cavalry was also anxiously awaiting the arrival of the 126th Rifle Division, which would be needed if the outer encirclement front was to have any holding power against the remnants of 4th Panzer Army and other German counterattack forces.

On the 22nd, while en route to its next objective, the village of Korobkin, the 61st engaged elements of the Romanian 8th Cavalry Division in a battle near Kitov State Farm, 20 km north of the village. Stavenkov's cavalrymen drove their Romanian counterparts back roughly 4 km to the village of Vodianaia. The following day, the division was cooperating with the 91st and 302nd Rifle Divisions, plus two battalions of 76th Fortified Region, to liberate the town of Sadovoe, outflanking the Romanian 4th by capturing the Umantsevo region, 10 km southwest of the town. The coordinated attacks by 61st Cavalry and 302nd Rifle Division forced the regiment of Romanian 8th Cavalry to withdraw 18 km south of Aksai, leaving the bulk of its artillery behind.

The division took the town of Umantsevo on the 23rd, following which it was ordered to rejoin the 81st Cavalry and push southwards into the broad region between Aksai and Sadovaia, which were 45 km apart. On November 24 the re-united 4th Cavalry Corps made the greatest advance of the forces of Stalingrad Front on that day, unhinging the meager Romanian defenses along the Aksai River, with 126th Rifle Division advancing gamely in the rear. Overnight on November 24–25, 4th Cavalry received orders from the Army commander, Maj. Gen. Nikolai Trufanov:

"to advance along the Gromoslavka, Verkhne-Iablochnyi, and Kotelnikovo march-route with 81st Cavalry Division and capture Kotelnikovo by 27 November, in cooperation with 61st Cavalry Division attacking toward Kotelnikovo from the east."

This order required the cavalry, in tandem with 126th Rifle Division, to traverse 90 to 95 km in three days and then capture an important rail center and road junction by attacking from three sides. Unknown to the Soviet command, on November 25 the remnants of 4th Panzer Army had been reorganized as Armeegruppe Hoth, incorporating the remnants of 4th Romanian Army, to buy time until mobile reinforcements could arrive by rail from the West and from Army Group A in the Caucasus.

Within hours of departing Umantsevo on the 25th, 61st Cavalry encountered trouble. Upon reaching the village of Sharnutovskii, about halfway to Kotelnikovo, it ran into a counterattacked staged jointly by Battlegroup Korne, led by the commander of Romanian 8th Cavalry Division, and Battlegroup Pannwitz, an ad hoc group of renegade Cossack cavalry with infantry and armor support. The Soviet unit was particularly vulnerable because it had left its infantry support far behind; the 126th was concentrating 30 km to the north, and the 302nd was 10 km farther to the rear as both divisions prepared to advance on Kotelnikovo. After a fight that lasted until early the next morning and resulted in heavy losses, the 61st was forced to withdraw back to Umantsevo, where it took up new defenses and licked its wounds. It likely remained there all day, at most sending out reconnaissance patrols. Meanwhile, 91st Rifle Division marched west to reinforce the troopers.

81st Cavalry Division, with about 35 tanks from 85th Tank Brigade, attempted to take Kotelnikovo on the 27th. This force successfully drove off the Romanian garrison in panic, but was then counterattacked by Battlegroup Pannwitz and arriving elements of 6th Panzer Division. This raid on Kotelnikovo enabled the 61st to advance cautiously once again in the direction of Sharnutovskii. Over the following days, as the rifle divisions advanced, the outer encirclement front of 51st Army appeared strong, but the arrival of German armor exposed its weaknesses.

During Operation Winter Storm in December, the weakened division fought defensive actions at Verkhne-Kumski and Gromoslavka against panzers supported by airpower. On the open steppe, German air attacks caused heavy losses in men and horses. By the time the division was withdrawn into Southwestern Front reserves in February it had suffered over 65 percent losses. On March 1, the remnants of the division came under the command of Colonel V.A. Koninskii, who was concurrently commanding the 97th Cavalry Division, recently assigned to 4th Cavalry Corps. That division was disbanded on March 4, while efforts went on to rebuild the Corps, but in the event these efforts came to naught, and the 61st Cavalry Division was officially disbanded on May 20.
