= 97th Cavalry Division =

97th Cavalry Division (November 1941 – 4 March 1943)
- Major General Ya.K. Kuliev
- Active: 1941–1943
- Country: Soviet Union
- Branch: Red Army
- Type: Division
- Role: Cavalry
- Engagements: Did not see combat

Commanders
- Notable commanders: Maj. Gen. Ya. K. Kuliev; Col. V. A. Koninskii

The 97th Cavalry Division was a cavalry division of the Red Army that served in the first years of the Great Patriotic War, but did not see any combat. It began forming in November, 1941, in the Central Asia Military District as a "Turkmen National Division". Three other cavalry divisions, the 61st, 63rd and the 81st were formed in this district at about the same time, also from men of Central Asian nationalities, and while those divisions became the latest complement of the 3rd Formation of the 4th Cavalry Corps in November, the 97th did not join that Corps until over a year later.

When formed, its partial order of battle was as follows:

- 279th Cavalry Regiment
- 298th Cavalry Regiment
- plus an unidentified cavalry regiment.

The division was initially commanded by Colonel T.P. Gaikazyan, but on Feb. 28, 1942 he was replaced by the newly promoted Major General Yakub Kuliev, who had previously commanded the 21st Mountain Cavalry Division. From August to December the division remained in the reserves of the Central Asia Military District. On August 28, Kuliev went on to the post of deputy commander of 4th Cavalry Corps.

In January, 1943, the 97th, now under command of Colonel V.A. Koninskii, was ferried across the Caspian Sea by the Caspian Flotilla to Astrakhan to join 4th Cavalry Corps, which was being rebuilt in this area after taking very heavy losses south of Stalingrad during Operation Uranus and Operation Winter Storm. In the event, this effort was abandoned, and the division, along with the rest of the Corps, was disbanded in March.
