= 81st Cavalry Division =

81st Cavalry Division (September 1, 1941 – May 22, 1943)
- Active: 1941–1943
- Country: Soviet Union
- Branch: Red Army
- Type: Division
- Role: Cavalry
- Engagements: Battle of Stalingrad; Operation Uranus; Operation Winter Storm; Rostov Offensive Operation

Commanders
- Notable commanders: Col. Dmitrii Ivanovich Gushtichev; Col. Vasilii Grigorevich Baumshtein; Col. Anton Filippovich Skorokhod

The 81st Cavalry Division was a mounted division of the Red Army that served in the first years of the Great Patriotic War. It was formed in the autumn of 1941 and served in the region south of Stalingrad while the German Army besieged that city in the autumn of 1942. During the first stages of the Soviet counteroffensive, Operation Uranus, the 81st was given a prominent role in the exploitation to the southwest, but became overextended and vulnerable to the mobile German reinforcements arriving to attempt a breakthrough to their 6th Army. The division was badly mauled in the opening stages of Operation Winter Storm, but continued to serve in Southern Front's advance on Rostov and on into the Donbass. It was finally disbanded in May, 1943.

== Formation ==
The 81st Cavalry Division began forming on September 1, 1941 in the Central Asia Military District at Dzhambul.

When formed, by the middle of the next month, its basic order of battle was as follows:

- 216th Cavalry Regiment
- 227th Cavalry Regiment
- 232nd Cavalry Regiment
- 16th Horse Artillery Battalion

The division was commanded by Col. Dmitrii Ivanovich Gustishev. In November 1941, the division was assigned to 4th Cavalry Corps, and it would remain in that corps as long as they both existed. The division was located near Kushka and continued to train. On September 20, 1942, led by the new division commander, Col. Vasily Grigoryevich Baumshtein, the division was sent by train to Krasnovodsk. The division crossed the Caspian Sea by ship to Astrakhan. At Olya the ships were unloaded by barges. The division marched along the Volga and reached the villages of Raygorod and Svetlyy Yar, 15 to 20 km southeast of Beketovki. The corps was assigned to 51st Army in Southwestern Front, south of Stalingrad, in October, 1942. In orders issued by Gen. G.K. Zhukov on October 15 to the Front commander, Gen. A.I. Yeryomenko, the latter was to:

"Concentrate 61st Cavalry Division in the Solodnikov region and 81st Cavalry Division in the Chernyi Yar region to protect the crossings over the Volga River."

This attempt to relieve 62nd Army, along with several others in October and early November, had no success.

== Operation Uranus ==
In Operation Uranus, the Soviet counteroffensive at Stalingrad, the division and its corps were to advance through the breakthrough made by infantry units on the second day of the offensive. The division was to advance in the sector between Lake Tsatsa and Lake Barmantsak, and by the morning of the third day reach the station area and the village of Abganerovo, cutting the Stalingrad-Tikhoretsk Railway.

At the start of the decisive Soviet counteroffensive on November 19 the 81st was part of the 51st Army Mobile Group that exploited into the breakthrough of the Romanian Army lines towards the southwest. This mobile group had the 4th Mechanized Corps in the lead, with the 81st and 61st Cavalry Divisions guarding its left flank. On the evening of November 20, the division left its concentration area and by dawn the next day had passed Lake Tsatsa and Semkin. At Height 143.3 to the southwest of Plovdovitye, units of the Romanian 5th Cavalry Division put up resistance. The division captured the height in two hours and was soon near Abganerovskoy. The division captured Abganerovskoy stanitsa in conjunction with the 61st. The 227th Cavalry Regiment attacked to the northwest and captured Abganerovo Station.

On the night of November 22 the division was on the northern outskirts of Abganerovo. On the next night the division advanced towards Aksay. Supported by attached 76mm guns and Guards Mortar units, the division was able to liberate the town of Aksay from the Romanians by noon. In the fighting, 38 soldiers of the division had been killed and 89 wounded. On the evening of November 23, the 51st Army commander, Maj. Gen. N. I. Trufanov, radioed Yeryomenko to report that:

"The main mission is accomplished. The army's units are fighting with the enemy along the Karpovka, Sovetskii, Aksay, Umantsevo, and Sadovoe line."

=== Fighting for Kotelnikovo ===
The next objective was the town of Kotelnikovo, an important rail junction where German mobile troops were beginning to arrive. The division rested and replenished its supplies on November 24. On the night of November 25 the division moved westwards in the right flank of the 51st Army. The division was to cover the main forces of the Army from the northwest in the attack on Kotelnikovo. Unknown to the Soviet commanders, on this same day the German high command began reorganizing their forces and bringing in armored units for an eventual relief operation towards Stalingrad that would be based from this town. After an advance of 45km on the morning of November 27, with support of 35 tanks from 85th Tank Brigade but no rifle forces whatsoever, the 81st reached the western and northwestern approaches to Kotelnikovo. The division attacked into the heart of the town, trying to capture it off the march, and succeeded in routing several Romanian units but then ran into lead elements of 6th Panzer Division's 114th Motorized Infantry Regiment, which had been "battle loaded" prior to their long journey from France. The panzer troops, along with a unit of Cossack volunteers known as Group Pannwitz, defeated the 81st and drove it westward 10 - 12km into marshland along the Semichnaia River valley.

In preparation for the German advance on Stalingrad 4th Cavalry Corps was directed to prepare four antitank strongpoints in its area of operation, which was now roughly 20 km north of Kotelnikovo. On December 2 the 81st and the 85th Tank Brigade were ordered to again attack the town. However, the Brigade had to wait for fuel to come up, and the attack was delayed by 24 hours. At 1500 hours on December 3 the combined force captured Pokhleben from the 4th Company of the 114th Motorized. When the 4th Cavalry Corps commander, Lt. Gen. T. T. Shapkin, learned that prisoners taken were from 6th Panzer he twice asked Trufanov for permission to break contact and withdraw northward. Trufanov refused the request and ordered Shapkin to advance on the morning of December 4. In the event, 6th Panzer, with up to 150 tanks, launched a full-scale counterattack just as the Soviet force was moving forward. The 81st was completely surrounded by 1400 hours and the German forces began to squeeze the pocket tight. During the night the division, now broken into small groups, was forced to break out towards Soviet lines. Colonel Baumshtein was killed in action during this fighting, along with his chief of staff and chief of the political section. In the course of less than three weeks the 81st had lost 1,897 men, 14 76mm guns, 4 45mm antitank guns, 4 107mm mortars, and 8 37mm antiaircraft guns. By the middle of December the remnants of the division were withdrawn into reserve, under the command of Col. Anton Filippovich Skorokhod, who would remain in this post until the unit was disbanded.

By the end of December the division had recovered sufficiently that it could rejoin 4th Corps as part of a shock group to liquidate the German Corps Mieth, which was located in the great bend of the Don River, south of the Chir River, based on the town of Tormosin. Between December 20, 1942 and February 1, 1943 the 81st recorded the following casualties: 15 killed or died; 24 wounded; 2 sick; 1 frostbitten; and 540 missing. On May 22, 1943, the division was officially disbanded.
