= 81st Rifle Division =

- Active: 1st formation: 1936–1941; 2nd formation: 1942–1946
- Country: Soviet Union
- Branch: Red Army
- Type: Infantry

The 81st Rifle Division was an infantry division of the Red Army during World War II.

It was established at Lubny (Kiev or Kharkov Military Districts) around 1936. As 81st Mechanised Division, part of 4th Mechanised Corps, with 6th Army, Southwestern Front, in June 1941. Fought at Voronezh and Kursk. With Soviet 1st Guards Army of the 4th Ukrainian Front 5.45.
