= Privolzhskaya Railway =

Transport company

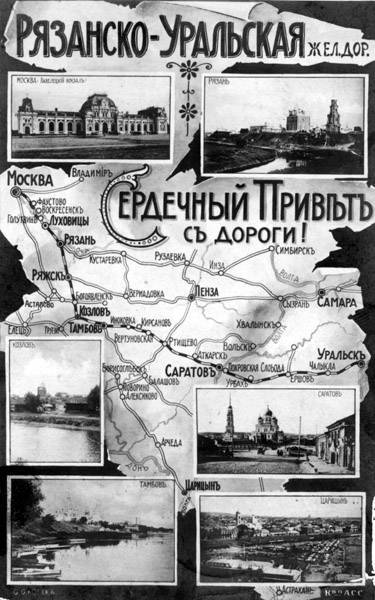
Advertisement of Ryazan-Uralsk Railway, 1913

The Privolzhskaya Railway (Приволжская железная дорога; "Volga Railway") is a subsidiary of the Russian Railways headquartered in Saratov. It serves the Saratov, Volgograd, and Astrakhan regions of Russia. Its three branches are headquartered in Saratov, Volgograd, and Astrakhan. The railway route length totals 4236,8 km. The network has 31 146 employees (as of 2009). A short stretch of the railway crosses the territory of Kazakhstan. It was established in 1953 by the merger of the Stalingrad Railway and Ryazan-Uralsk Railway and was recently extended to Olya, a port on the Caspian Sea.

About 50 km (31 mi) north of Astrakhan, the railway crosses the Akhtuba river on a 494 m (1,621 ft) truss bridge, which was widened in 2021 to eliminate the last single-track section between Baskunchak and Astrakhan. The route is part of the North-South International Transport Corridor to Moscow and Kazakhstan.
