= Vladimir Zhdanov =

Vladimir Ivanovich Zhdanov
- Zhdanov in 1962
- Born: 29 April 1902; Kiev, Russian Empire
- Died: 19 October 1964 (aged 62); Avala near Belgrade, Yugoslavia
- Military career
- Allegiance: Russian SFSR; Soviet Union
- Branch: Red Army (later Soviet Army)
- Service years: 1920–1921; 1923–1964
- Rank: Colonel general
- Commands: 4th Guards Mechanized Corps; 5th Guards Mechanized Division; 6th Guards Mechanized Army; Military Academy of the Armored Forces
- Conflicts: Russian Civil War; World War II
- Awards: Hero of the Soviet Union; Order of Lenin (2); Order of the Red Banner (3); Order of Suvorov, 1st class; Order of Suvorov, 2nd class (2); Order of Kutuzov, 2nd class; Order of the Red Star; People's Hero of Yugoslavia

Vladimir Ivanovich Zhdanov (Russian: Владимир Иванович Жданов; 29 April 1902 – 19 October 1964) was a colonel-general of tank troops in the armed forces of the Soviet Union. He was a major general in the Soviet Red Army during World War II.

== Military career ==
In 1941, Zhdanov became the Assistant Commandant of the Syzransk Tank School. He attended the Military Academy of the General Staff from 1941 to 1942. From 1942 to 1944 he was the Chief of Staff of the 13th Tank Corps. He commanded the 4th Guards Mechanized Corps in 1944 and 1945. From 1945 to 1947 he was the Commanding Officer of the 5th Guards Mechanized Division. He then commanded the 6th Guards Mechanized Division from 1947 to 1949. He attended the Military Academy of the General Staff in 1950 and 1951. He was the Chief of Staff of the Far Eastern Military District until 1953. From 1951 to 1953 he was also the Assistant Commander in Chief of the Far Eastern Military District. He also served as the Deputy Commander in Chief of the Southern Ural Military District and the Soviet Central Group of Forces. He was also the First Assistant Commander in Chief of the Transbaikal Military District. From 1961 to 1964, he was the Senior Military Adviser to the East German Army. In 1964, he was the Commandant of the Military Academy of the Tank Forces in the Soviet Union.

He was a recipient of the Hero of the Soviet Union Award.

== Belgrade Offensive ==
He was the commander of the 4th Guards Mechanized Corps in 1944 during the Belgrade Offensive. This unit captured Belgrade on October 20, 1944. He was awarded the medal Order of the People's Hero of Yugoslavia. Two streets were also named after him in Belgrade.

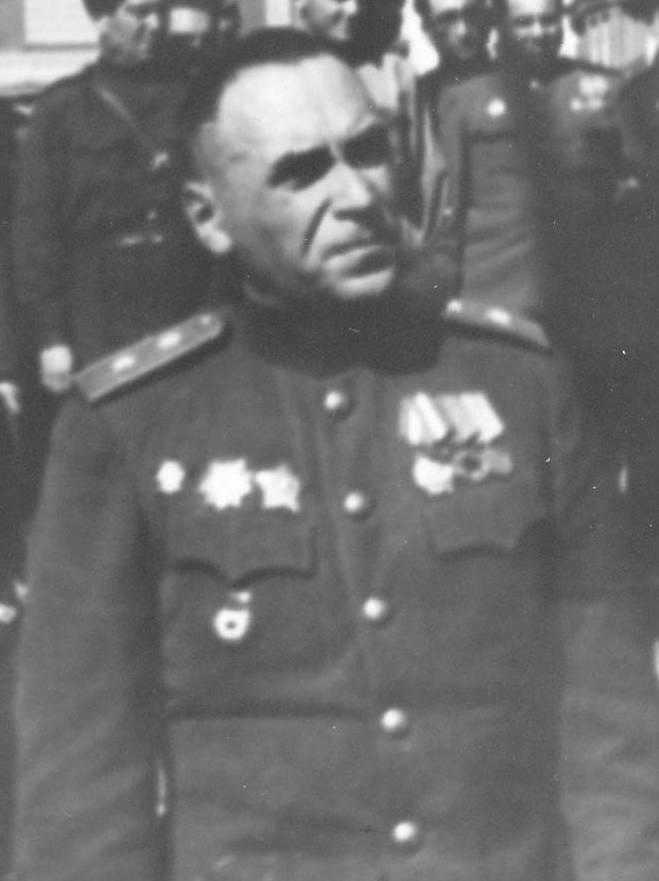
Zhdanov in Belgrade in 1944

== Death ==
He died on October 19, 1964, when his plane crashed at Avala on his way to attend the 20th anniversary of the Soviet conquest of Belgrade on October 20, 1944. Soviet Marshal Sergey Biryuzov was also killed in the crash.

== Legacy ==
Resavska Street in downtown Belgrade was named after him from 1946 to 1951 and then again from 1965 to 1997. In 2010, an initiative was launched to name a street in the Novi Beograd or New Belgrade section of Belgrade after him. In 2016, the city manager of Belgrade, Goran Vesić, announced that the Belgrade Assembly or Skupština had accepted the initiative and a street in the New Belgrade section of the city, formerly Pohorska Street, was renamed General Zhdanov Street. Goce Delčev Street was renamed Marshal Tolbukhin Boulevard to commemorate Fyodor Tolbukhin.

== Sources ==
- Biryuzov, Sergei S. Sovetskii soldat na balkanakh [Soviet soldiers in the Balkans]. (In Russian). Moskva: Voenizdat, 1963.
- Biryuzov, Sergeĭ Semenovich, and Rade Hamović. Beogradska Operacija. (In Serbian). Beograd: Vojni istoriski institut Jugoslovenske narodne armije, 1964.
- Erickson, John. The Road to Berlin: Continuing the History of Stalin’s War with Germany. Boulder, Colorado: Westview Press, 1983. pp. 379–390.
- Medvedev, Zhores A., and Roy A. Medvedev. The Unknown Stalin: His Life, Death and Legacy. London: I.B. Tauris, 2003. p. 212-214.
- Tolubko, Vladimir F. Ot Vidina do Belgrada: istoriko-memuarnyĭ ocherk o boevykh deĭstvii͡akh sovetskikh tankistov v Belgradskoĭ operat͡sii. (In Russian). Moscow, 1968.
