= 4th Guards Motor Rifle Division =

Motor rifle division of the Soviet Army

4th Guards Motor Rifle Division (1964–1989) 63rd Guards Motor Rifle Division (1957–1964) 4th Guards Mechanized Division (1945–1957) 4th Guards Mechanized Corps (1943–1945) 13th Tank Corps (1942–1943)
- Active: 1942–1989
- Country: Soviet Union
- Branch: Red Army (1942-1946); Soviet Army (1946-1989)
- Type: Infantry
- Engagements: World War II
- Decorations: Order of the Red Banner; Order of Suvorov 2nd class; Order of Kutuzov 2nd class
- Battle honours: Stalingrad (removed and replaced with Volgograd)

Commanders
- Notable commanders: Trofim Tanaschishin; Vladimir Zhdanov

The 4th Guards Motor Rifle Division (Russian: 4-я гвардейская мотострелковая дивизия) was a motorized infantry division of the Soviet Army during the Cold War.

The division began its history as the 13th Tank Corps of the Red Army, formed in April 1942 during World War II and fought in the Soviet counterattack against Case Blue, the Battle of Voronezh, and the Battle of Stalingrad. The corps lost so many tanks that it was reorganized with a mechanized corps structure in November, though it retained the 13th Tank Corps designation. For its actions the corps became the 4th Guards Mechanized Corps in early 1943 and received the Stalingrad honorific. It continued to fight in combat for most of the rest of the war, receiving the Order of the Red Banner for its role in the Nikopol–Krivoi Rog Offensive of early 1944, the Order of Suvorov, 2nd class for its actions in the Odessa Offensive, and the Order of Kutuzov, 2nd class for its actions in the Second Jassy–Kishinev Offensive. In the final months of the war the corps advanced into Bulgaria, Serbia, Hungary, and southern Czechoslovakia before being withdrawn into the reserve.

Several weeks after the end of the war, the corps was converted into the 4th Guards Mechanized Division and based at Sofia. In the late 1940s it was withdrawn to Ukraine, and was based at Lugansk by the time it became the 63rd Guards Motor Rifle Division in 1957. It was renumbered as the 4th Guards Motor Rifle Division to preserve its traditions in 1964, and was sent to Termez during the Soviet–Afghan War to replace a division deployed to the latter. When it returned to Lugansk in 1989, the division was reduced to a storage base, which was disbanded in 1991.

== World War II ==
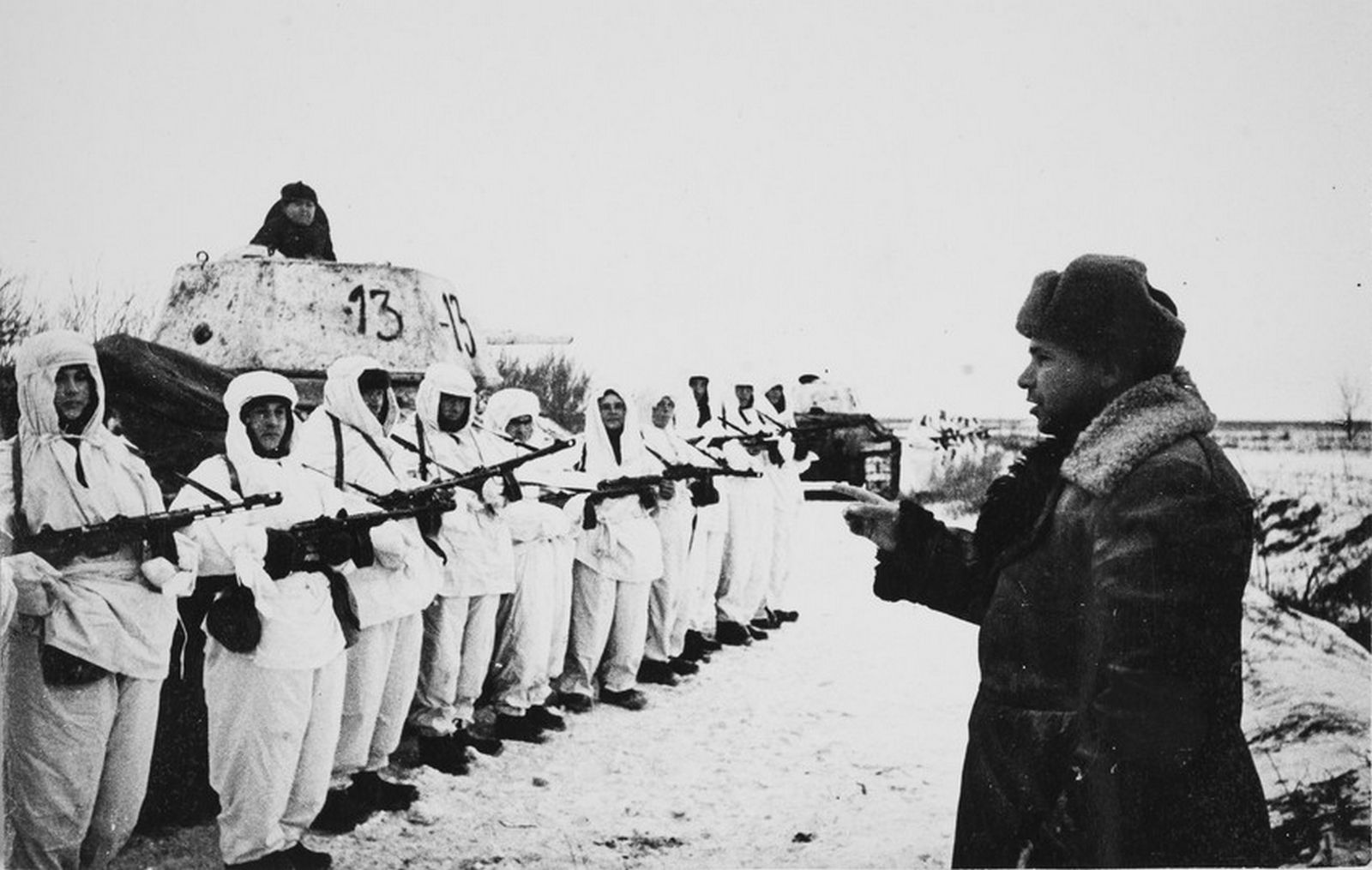
Deputy commander for political affairs of the 13th Tank Corps' 61st Mechanized Brigade Yakov Lyashko addresses a formation of submachine gunners, January 1943

The corps was formed during April and May 1942 in the Stalingrad Military District as the 13th Tank Corps, under the command of Major General Pyotr Shurov. It included the 65th, 85th, and 88th Tank Brigades as well as the 20th Motor Rifle Brigade and support units. The corps saw its first combat on 10 June in the area of Prikolotnoye southwest of Kupiansk as part of the Southwestern Front. During June and July the corps was part of the 28th Army, then transferred to the 21st Army to participate in the Battle of Voronezh (the Voronezh–Voroshilovgrad Operation). Shruov was mortally wounded in July and replaced by Colonel Trofim Tanaschishin, who would be promoted to major general on 7 December 1942 and to lieutenant general on 30 August 1943. On 23 July 1942 it was transferred to the Stalingrad Front, with which it fought in the Battle of Stalingrad. Due to heavy losses of tanks, in November the corps was reorganized as a mechanized corps with the 1st, 17th, and 62nd Mechanized Brigades, though it retained the 13th Tank Corps designation.

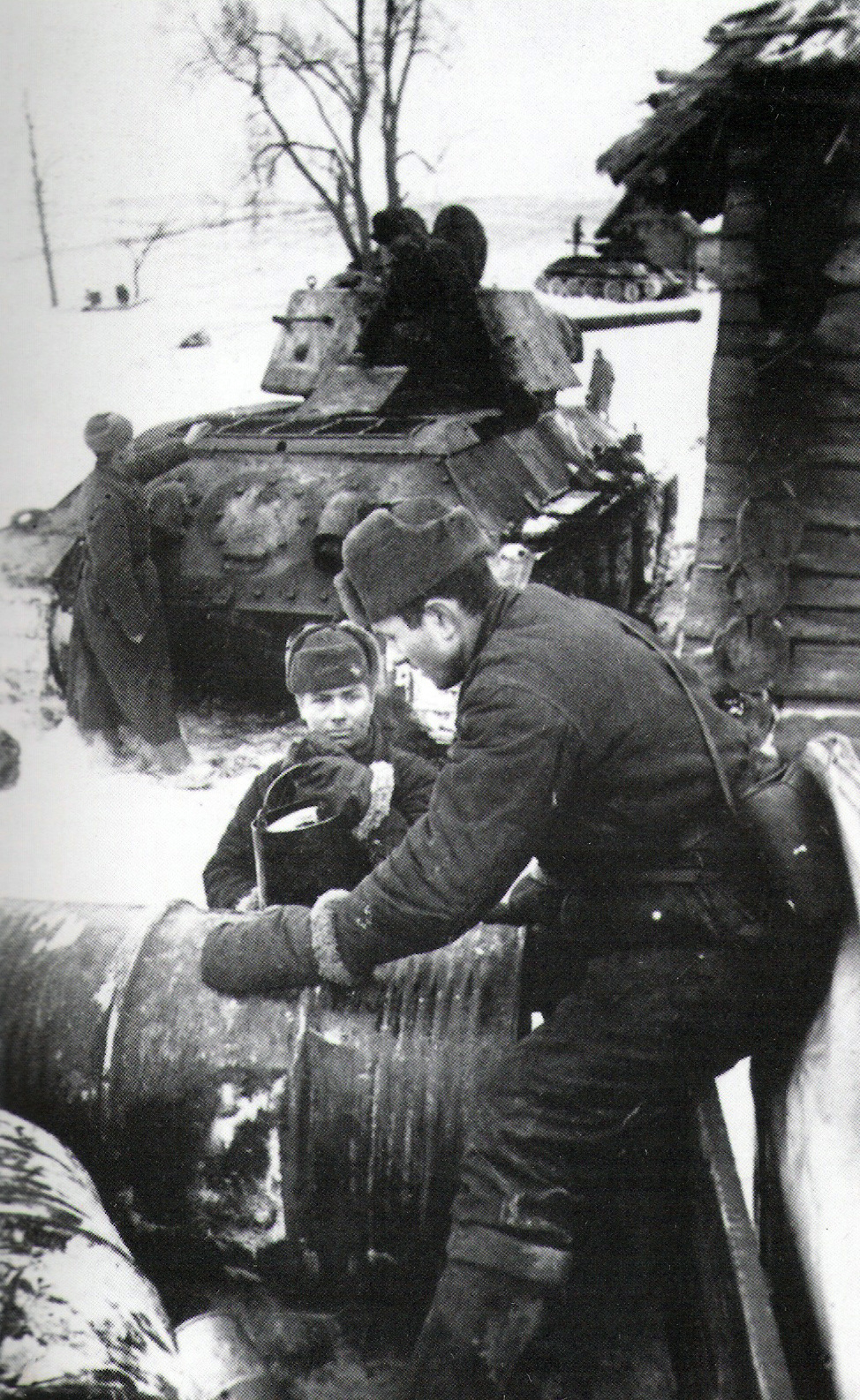
Soviet tank crews during the winter of 1942–1943

The corps fought in Operation Uranus, helping to encircle the Axis southern flank, in the repulse of the German counterattack Operation Winter Storm, and in the counteroffensive of Operation Little Saturn. For "showing perseverance, courage, discipline, and organization" in these actions, in addition to the "heroism displayed by its personnel," the corps was made an elite Guards unit, the 4th Guards Mechanized Corps, on 9 January 1943, and received the Stalingrad honorific on 27 January. Its subordinate brigades accordingly became the 13th, 14th, and 15th Guards Mechanized Brigades. Between January 1943 and mid-January 1944 the corps fought as part of the Southern Front, which became the 4th Ukrainian Front on 20 October 1943. It participated in the Rostov Offensive, the Donbass Strategic Offensive, and the Melitopol Offensive during this period.

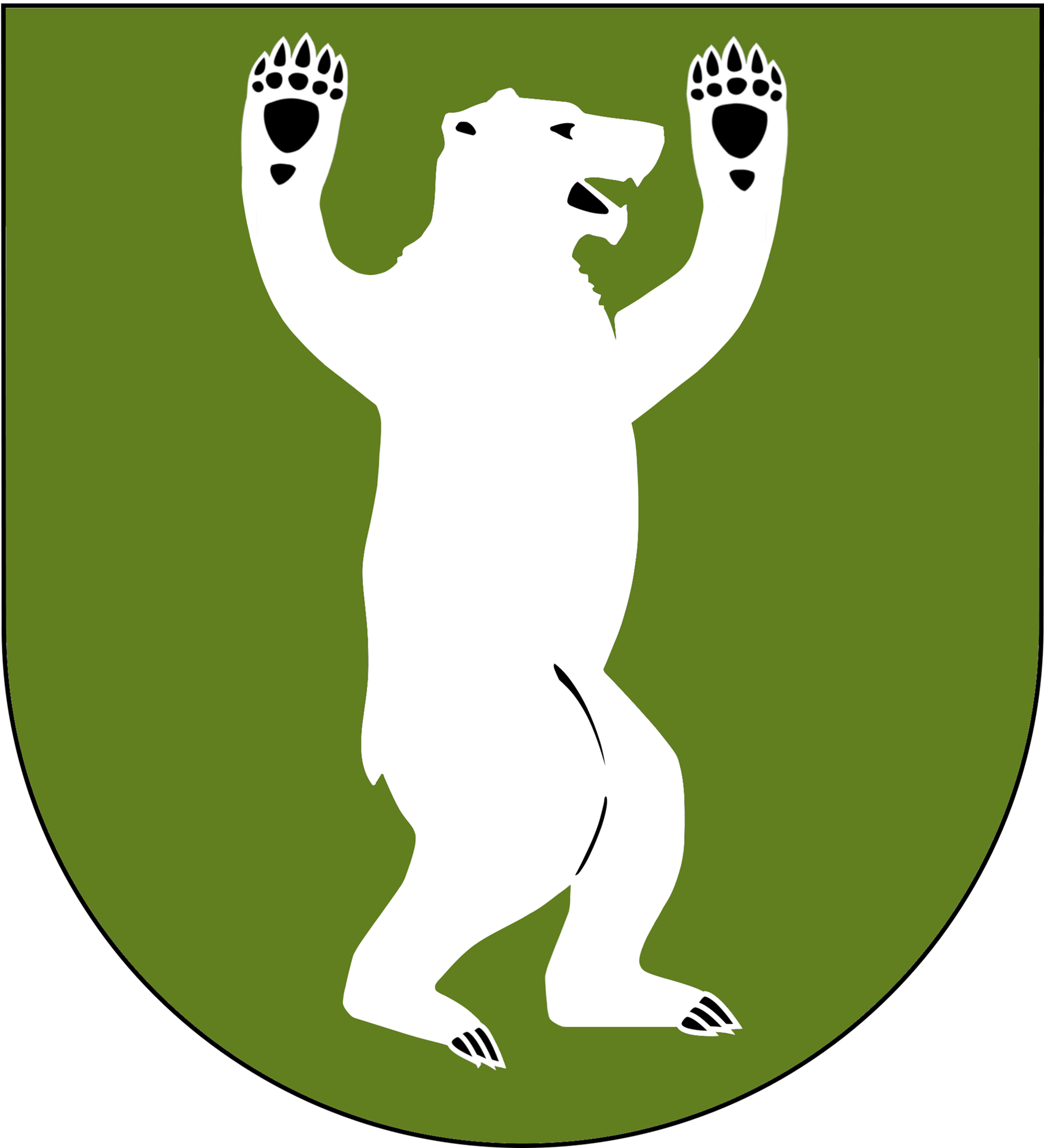
Identification symbol painted on vehicles of the corps' 36th Guards Tank Brigade

Transferred to the 3rd Ukrainian Front in mid-January 1944, the corps was attached to the 8th Guards Army for the Nikopol–Krivoi Rog Offensive. Between 16 and 18 January it was relocated to support a breakthrough of the flanks on the 46th and 8th Guards Armies, with the objective of capturing the critical rail junction of Apostolovo to link up with forces of the 4th Ukrainian Front and cut off German troops in the Nikopol bridgehead. The corps numbered 7,304 men on 31 January of which 3,394 were considered "bayonets" (combat troops), and fielded 123 tanks and self-propelled guns. Of these, 92 were T-34 medium tanks, sixteen T-70 light tanks, one Mk III Valentine tank, eight SU-85 self-propelled guns, and six SU-152 heavy self-propelled guns. Artillery support was provided by eight 20 mm guns, four 37 mm guns, 23 45 mm anti-tank guns, 29 76 mm guns, 34 82 mm mortars, and fourteen 120 mm mortars. During the offensive, it helped to capture Nikopol and Apostolovo, earning it the Order of the Red Banner for its "exemplary completion of combat missions" and "valor and courage" on 13 February 1944. The corps lost 502 killed, 1,254 wounded, and 61 missing during the offensive for a total of 1,817 casualties and 31 tanks and self-propelled guns. The 4th Guards Mechanized was attached to the Cavalry Mechanized Group commanded by Lieutenant General Issa Pliyev for the subsequent Bereznegovatoye–Snigeryovka and Odessa Offensives. For helping to capture Odessa among other objectives during the latter, the corps was awarded the Order of Suvorov, 2nd class, on 20 April. Among the corps personnel posthumously awarded the Hero of the Soviet Union title for their actions in these operations were tank commanders and Junior Lieutenants Boris Grebennikov and Vadim Sivkov, and gunner and radio operator Ryadovoy Pyotr Krestyaninov. Tanaschishin was also killed in action during the Odessa Offensive at the end of March and replaced by Major General Vladimir Zhdanov, who commanded it for the rest of the war and was promoted to lieutenant general on 13 September.

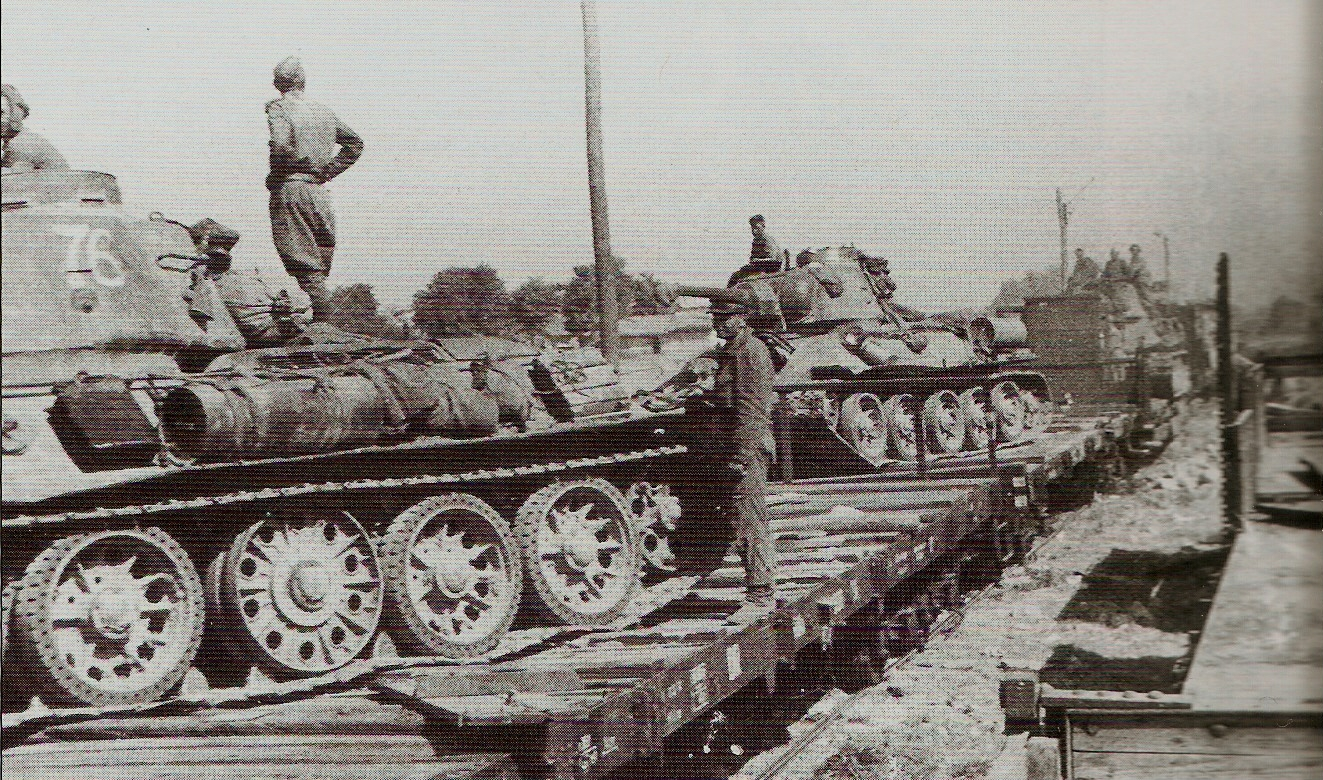
Tankers of the corps preparing for an attack in Romania, 1944

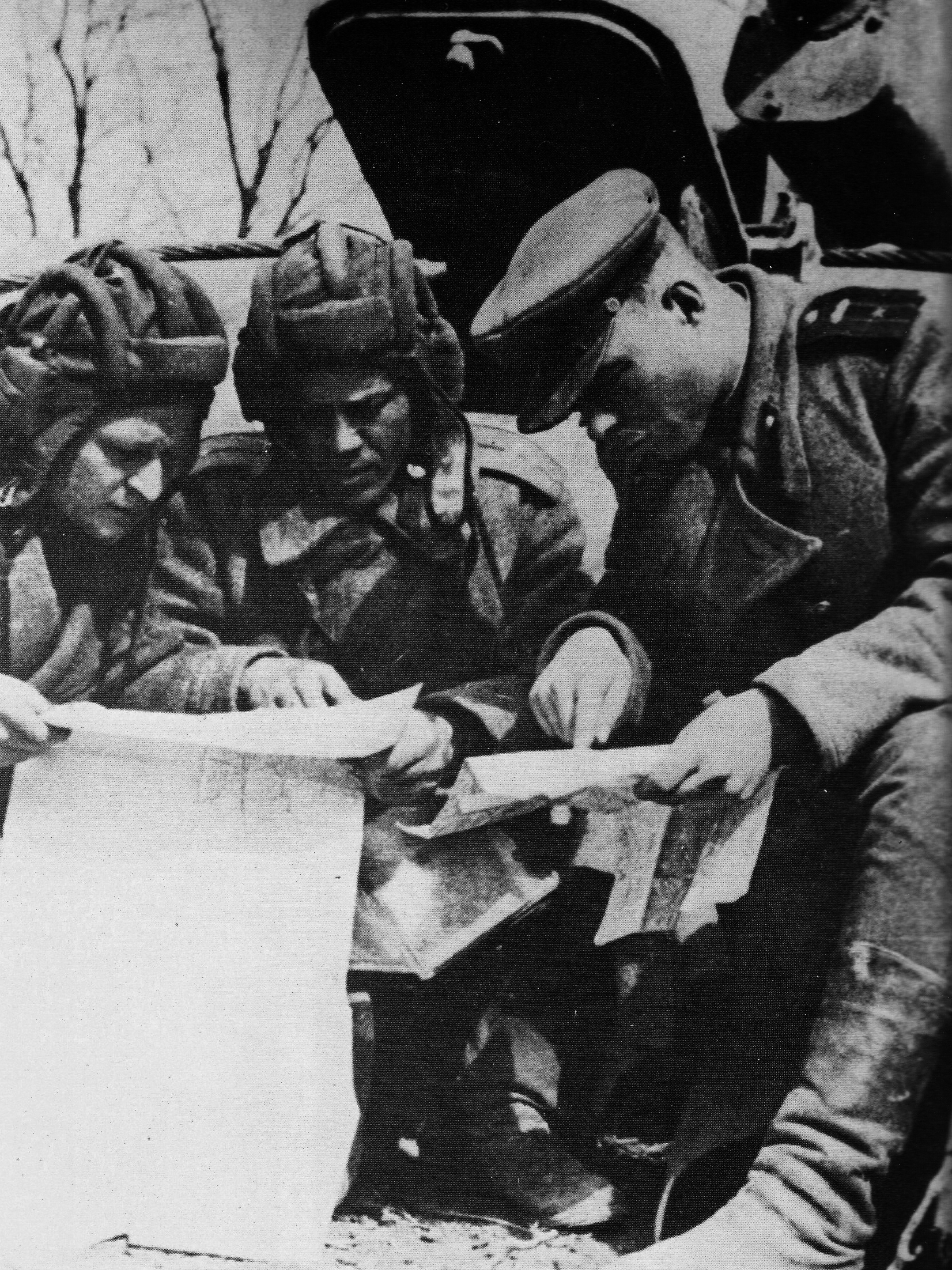
A Soviet tank crew discussing plans during the Budapest Offensive

Attacking in conjunction with the 7th Mechanized and 18th Tank Corps during the August Second Jassy–Kishinev Offensive, the corps reached the area of Huși and Leova to encircle and destroy a large Axis group of eighteen divisions. For this action it received the Order of Kutuzov, 2nd class, on 7 September. In early September the corps swept southward into Bulgaria, then west during the Belgrade Offensive to capture the Yugoslav capital of Belgrade on 20 October. For their actions in the latter 214 corps personnel received Yugoslav decorations, and Zhdanov was made a Hero of Yugoslavia. The corps was transferred to the 2nd Ukrainian Front in late October, and served with it until February 1945. The corps was successively attached to the 46th Army from 1 November, Cavalry-Mechanized Group Pliev from 28 November, the 6th Guards Tank Army from 23 December, and the 7th Guards Army from 26 January 1945 during the Budapest Offensive. It saw its last combat action during the advance into southern Czechoslovakia on the Hron north of Esztergom, and in late February was withdrawn into the front reserve. The corps then transferred to the Reserve of the Supreme High Command on 15 April, in which it ended the war. For their actions during the war, 16,500 personnel of the corps were decorated, while nineteen others were made Heroes of the Soviet Union.

== Postwar ==
The 4th Guards Mechanized Corps was converted into the 4th Guards Mechanized Division in June 1945; its three mechanized brigades and one tank brigade were likewise converted into regiments with the same numbers. By that time, the division was a separate division of the Southern Group of Forces. It became part of the 10th Mechanized Army when that force was formed in June 1946 while stationed at Sofia. It briefly became part of the Special Mechanized Army there on 20 December 1947, but was withdrawn to the Kiev Military District in early 1948, joining the 14th Guards Rifle Corps. On 4 June 1957 it was redesignated as the 63rd Guards Motor Rifle Division. At the same time, the 13th, 14th, and 15th Guards Mechanized Regiments became the 365th, 367th, and 15th Guards Motor Rifle Regiments, respectively, while the 36th Guards Tank Regiment was renumbered as the 304th Guards. That year, the division became part of the 6th Guards Tank Army, whose headquarters had recently been transferred to the district. In the Kiev Military District the division was stationed at Lugansk by 1957 and renumbered as the 4th Guards Motor Rifle Division to restore its World War II number on 17 November 1964. Its Stalingrad honorific was removed in 1961 and replaced with Volgograd to reflect the name change of that city on 29 September 1964.

By 1965, the division was directly subordinated to the district headquarters. It was transferred to Termez and directly subordinated to the Turkestan Military District headquarters during February 1980, replacing the 108th Motor Rifle Division, which had been sent to fight in the Soviet–Afghan War. The division left behind the 15th Guards Motor Rifle Regiment, which was used to form the 46th Motor Rifle Division at Lugansk, part of the new 64th Army Corps. The 15th Guards were replaced by the newly formed 1213th Motor Rifle Regiment at Termez. When the 4th Guards returned to Lugansk in March 1989 after the 108th returned to Termez when the Soviet Army withdrew from Afghanistan, the 46th Motor Rifle Division disbanded that same month, followed by the 64th Army Corps in July. Later that year, the division itself was reduced to the 5197th Guards Weapons and Equipment Storage Base, where nearly 40 vehicles – 26 R-145BM, 3 R-156BTR, 3 PRP-3, 2 BMP-1KSh, 3 1V18, 1 1V19, and 1 UR-67 – were stored; the base was disbanded in March 1991.

== Commanders ==
The following officers commanded the corps and division:

- Major General Pyotr Yevdokimovich Shurov (23 May–2 July 1942)
- Major General Trofim Tanaschishin (17 July 1942–31 March 1944, promoted lieutenant general 30 August 1943)
- Major General Vladimir Zhdanov (31 March 1944–July 1946, promoted lieutenant general 13 September 1944)
- Lieutenant General Nikolay Dreyer (July 1946–16 September 1949)
- Major General Vasily Gorishny (16 September 1949–15 December 1951)
- Major General Nikolay Grigoryevich Dushak (30 January 1952–27 July 1954)
- Colonel Vasily Mikhailovich Meshkov (27 July 1954–3 January 1957)
- Colonel Grigory Ivanovich Semenko (3 January 1957–8 August 1963)
- Major General Nikolay Grigoryevich Usoltsev (8 August 1963–)
- Major General Vladimir Nikolayevich Konchits (–28 November 1969)
- Colonel Vladimir Dmitriyevich Kostylev (28 November 1969–19 July 1972, major general 20 May 1971)
- Colonel Nikolay Fyodorovich Grachyov (19 July 1972–1974, major general 8 May 1974)
