= Trofim Tanaschishin =

Soviet lieutenant general (1903–1944)

Trofim Ivanovich Tanaschishin
- Born: 31 January 1903; Yaryshev, Mogilyovsky Uyezd, Podolia Governorate, Russian Empire
- Died: 31 March 1944 (aged 41) Voznesensk area, Voznesensk Raion, Nikolayev Oblast, Ukrainian SSR, Soviet Union
- Allegiance: Russian SFSR; Soviet Union
- Branch: Red Army
- Service years: 1918–1944
- Rank: Lieutenant general
- Commands: 13th Tank Corps (later 4th Guards Mechanized Corps)
- Conflicts: Russian Civil War; Polish–Soviet War; World War II
- Awards: Order of the Red Banner (2); Order of Suvorov, 1st and 2nd class; Order of the Patriotic War, 1st class; Honorary Knight Commander of the Order of the British Empire

Trofim Ivanovich Tanaschishin (Russian: Трофим Иванович Танасчишин; Ukrainian: Трохим Іванович Танасчішин, romanized: Trokhym Ivanovych Tanaschishyn; 31 January 1903 – 31 March 1944) was a Red Army lieutenant general killed during World War II.

Tanaschishin joined a Soviet partisan unit during the Russian Civil War and was transferred to the Red Army, with which he fought in the Polish–Soviet War, being captured by Polish troops but released. During the interwar period he held cavalry command positions and in the early 1930s became an officer of the armored forces. When Operation Barbarossa, the German invasion of the Soviet Union, began, Tanaschishin commanded a tank regiment encircled in Belarus. He escaped and was decorated for his leadership of a motorcycle regiment during the Battle of Moscow. After commanding a tank brigade on the Southwestern Front in mid-1942, Tanaschishin was appointed commander of the 13th Tank Corps. For his leadership of the corps, which became the 4th Guards Mechanized Corps for its actions in the Battle of Stalingrad, Tanaschishin was again decorated and promoted to major general. He continued to lead the 4th Guards Mechanized in combat until he was mortally wounded in an air raid at the end of March 1944.

== Early life, Russian Civil War, and Polish–Soviet War ==
Tanaschishin was born on 31 January 1903 in Yaryshev (now in Mohyliv-Podilskyi Raion of Vinnytsia Oblast). He joined a Red Army partisan detachment under the command of Chebanov in March 1918, fighting in Ukraine against German troops and the forces of Pavlo Skoropadskyi. The partisan detachment was reorganized as the 1st Serebrysky Regiment towards the end of the year, in which Tanaschishin became a mounted scout. In 1919, on the Southwestern Front, he fought against the Armed Forces of South Russia and the Ukrainian People's Army. The regiment suffered heavy losses in the fighting and following this he joined the 395th Rifle Regiment. In the spring of 1920 Tanaschishin fought with the regiment in the Polish–Soviet War, fell seriously ill and became a straggler in Ukrainian People's Army territory. After recovering, he tried to rejoin his unit but was captured on 19 May and imprisoned in the Mogilyovsky Prison until July, when he was released by advancing Soviet troops. He joined the 535th Rifle Regiment, fighting against the Ukrainian People's Army. Between April and November 1921, he fought against anti-Soviet forces in Mogilyovsky Uyezd as assistant platoon commander in a separate special purpose cavalry battalion.

== Interwar period ==
After the end of the war, Tanaschishin became a physical training instructor for pre-conscription training of conscripts at the local military commissariat. In August 1925 he became a student at the S.M. Budyonny Ukrainian Cavalry School in Yelizavetgrad. After graduation in September 1928, he served in the 9th Cavalry Division as a platoon commander in the 52nd Cavalry Regiment, then in the 54th Separate Reserve Squadron. In May 1931, Tanaschishin graduated from the Leningrad Armored Commanders' Improvement Courses, becoming commander of a training armored platoon of the Moscow Proletarian Rifle Division motor detachment in the Moscow Military District. This assignment was brief, as he was transferred in October to the 11th Cavalry Division as acting commander and commissar of a separate mechanized squadron, and commander of a training armored platoon. In April 1932 he became political officer of the training squadron of its 11th Mechanized Regiment, then commander of a tank squadron, and assistant regimental chief of staff.

Between November 1934 and May 1935 he was a student in the staff department of the Leningrad Armored Commanders' Improvement Courses, then returned to the 11th Mechanized Regiment, temporarily serving as assistant chief of staff and acting chief of staff of the regiment, then as acting regimental commander. In June 1938 he became chief of the second staff department of the 1st Tank Brigade in the Belorussian Special Military District, being appointed assistant chief of staff of the 21st Tank Brigade in the Western Special Military District in April 1940. Tanaschishin was made chief of supply for the new 4th Tank Division of the 6th Mechanized Corps in July, then commander of the 60th Tank Regiment of the latter's 30th Tank Division in March 1941.

== World War II ==
When Operation Barbarossa, the German invasion of the Soviet Union, began, the regiment fought in the engagements that became known as the border battles in Soviet historiography and was surrounded with the 10th Army of the Western Front. Tanaschishin managed to escape the encirclement and became commander of the 36th Separate Motorcycle Regiment in August, part of the 5th Army of the Western Front during the Battle of Moscow, during which it participated in fierce defensive battles in the Mozhaysk direction. He was characterized by a superior as a "resolute, courageous, and bold commander" whose "personal skill, example, and courage" enabled a series of attacks against German forces at Vereya and Mozhaysk. His "decisive and swift actions" were credited with causing the defeat of the vanguard of the 7th Panzer Division in front of Borisovo, and a counterattack he led at Nikiforovskoye was credited with preventing a German occupation of the southeast bank of the Moskva River. For his leadership Tanaschishin received the Order of the Red Banner and the regiment became the 1st Guards Motorcycle Regiment.

Tanaschishin was transferred to command the 36th Tank Brigade, part of the Moscow Military District, in December. In April 1942 it was transferred to the newly formed 22nd Tank Corps of the 38th Army, fighting on the Southwestern Front. On 17 July he was promoted to command the 13th Tank Corps, which went on to fight as part of the 1st Tank, 64th, and 57th Armies of the Stalingrad Front in the Battle of Stalingrad. For its courage the corps became the 4th Guards Mechanized Corps and received the Stalingrad honorific, while 64th Army commander Major General Mikhail Shumilov wrote that Tanaschishin showed "initiative and versatility, strictness, decisiveness, and discipline, ability to control tank units in battle, to maneuver units and fight against superior German forces, and organize troops to perform combat missions." He led the corps through its repulse of the German counterattack during Operation Winter Storm and the advance to the Mius River.

Tanaschishin led the corps in the Rostov, Donbass, Melitopol, Nikopol–Krivoi Rog Offensives as part of the Southern Front (the 4th Ukrainian Front from 20 October 1943) in 1943 and early 1944, during which it captured Amvrosiivka and Bolshoy Tokmak, among others. He was promoted to lieutenant general on 30 August 1943. In March 1944 the corps fought as part of the Cavalry-Mechanized Group of General Issa Pliyev with the 3rd Ukrainian Front in the Bereznegovatoye–Snigirevka Offensive and the Odessa Offensive, capturing Novyi Buh among others, For its actions in these battles the corps received the Order of Suvorov, 2nd class. On 31 March 1944 Tanaschishin was mortally wounded by the explosion of a German bomb in the area of Voznesensk.

== Awards and honors ==
Tanaschishin was awarded the following Soviet decorations:

- Order of the Red Banner (2)
- Order of Suvorov, 1st and 2nd classes
- Order of the Patriotic War, 1st class

He was made an Honorary Knight Commander of the Order of the British Empire in 1943 along with other Soviet senior officers; his neck decoration was presented by British Ambassador to the Soviet Union Archibald Clark Kerr to People's Commissar of Foreign Affairs Vyacheslav Molotov in a 10 May 1944 ceremony.
