= Vasily Volsky =

Soviet general (1897–1946)

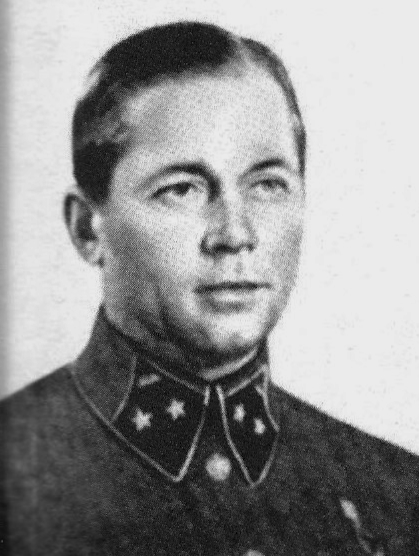
Vasily Timofeyevich Volsky

Vasily Timofeyevich Volsky (Russian: Василий Тимофе́евич Во́льский; 10 March 1897 in Tula Province, Russia – 22 February 1946 in Moscow, Soviet Union) was a General of Soviet tank forces.

From 1939–1941, Volsky headed the Soviet Union's Academy of Mechanisation and Motorisation. He then rose to command the 4th Mechanised Corps, which he led at the Battle of Stalingrad in late 1942. Initially Volsky had concerns over the planned Operation Uranus, going as far as to write Joseph Stalin a personal letter "as a good communist" warning him that the attack would fail. After a meeting with Stalin, Volsky retracted his letter and the Corps assisted in the encirclement and destruction of the Romanian army commanded by Gebele.

During 1943, Volsky commanded the 3rd Guards Tank Corps; in 1944, promoted to Colonel General, he was appointed the commander of 5th Guards Tank Army, replacing Pavel Rotmistrov.

Volsky, suffering from tuberculosis, was hospitalized in March 1945. He died on 22 February 1946 in Moscow.
