= Abganerovo =

Abganerovo (Russian: Абганерово) is the name of several rural localities in Russia:

- Abganerovo, Oktyabrsky District, Volgograd Oblast, a selo in Abganerovskoe Rural Settlement of Oktyabrsky District in the Volgograd Oblast
- Abganerovo, Svetloyarsky District, Volgograd Oblast, a selo in Abganerovskoe Rural Settlement of Svetloyarsky District in the Volgograd Oblast
