= Viktor Obukhov =

Soviet army colonel general

Viktor Timofeyevich Obukhov
- Obukhov in the early 1960s
- Born: 3 April [O.S. 22 March] 1898; Nikolskaya, Orenburgsky Uyezd, Orenburg Governorate, Russian Empire
- Died: 26 November 1975 (aged 77); Moscow, Soviet Union
- Burial place: Novodevichy Cemetery
- Military career
- Allegiance: (Russian Soviet Federative Socialist Republic) Russian SFSR; Soviet Union
- Branch: Red Army (1918–1946); Soviet Army (1946–1965)
- Service years: 1918–1965
- Rank: Colonel general
- Commands: 26th Tank Division; 3rd Guards Mechanized Corps (became 3rd Guards Mechanized Division); 4th Guards Tank Division (became 4th Guards Mechanized Army); 3rd Guards Mechanized Army (became 18th Guards Army)
- Conflicts: Russian Civil War; Basmachi Revolt; Battle of Khalkin Gol; World War II
- Awards: Hero of the Soviet Union; Order of Lenin (3); Order of the Red Banner (3); Order of Suvorov, 1st class; Order of the Patriotic War, 1st class; Order of the Red Star

Viktor Timofeyevich Obukhov (Russian: Виктор Тимофеевич Обухов; 3 April [O.S. 22 March] 1898 – 26 November 1975) was a Soviet Army colonel general and a Hero of the Soviet Union.

The son of an Orenburg Cossack, Obukhov fought on the Eastern Front of the Russian Civil War and commanded cavalry against the Basmachi Revolt until the late 1920s. He held staff positions during the late 1930s after a stint as an advisor in China and commanded a tank division in Belarus at the outbreak of Operation Barbarossa. His division suffered heavy losses, but Obukhov broke out of encirclement with the remnants and reached Soviet lines. He spent more than a year as a cavalry inspector and from May 1943 commanded the 3rd Guards Mechanized Corps, which he led for the rest of the war. Made a Hero of the Soviet Union for his leadership of the corps during Operation Bagration, Obukhov continued in command of the corps after the end of the war. Postwar, he held army command and ended his career as deputy chief of the Soviet tank troops, retiring in the mid-1960s.

== Early life and Russian Civil War ==
Obukhov was born on 3 April 1898 in the stanitsa of Nikolskaya, Orenburgsky Uyezd, Orenburg Governorate. The son of a Cossack, he graduated from the village school in 1914. During the Russian Civil War, Obukhov joined a Red Guard detachment in Orenburg in January 1918. In May he left the detachment to join the 1st Orenburg Soviet Laboring Cossack Cavalry Regiment of the Red Army, serving as a Red Army man, platoon leader, and assistant commander of a sotnia. The regiment fought in battles against the Siberian Army and the White Cossacks of Alexander Dutov. From February to May 1919 he was detached to take the Military-Political Course of the 1st Army in Orenburg and Syzran, then became an instructor in the political department of the 1st Army and assistant military commissar of the Southern Group of Forces of the Ural Front.

From July 1919 he studied at the 1st Moscow Soviet Cavalry Courses, then stayed on as a course commander and assistant squadron commander. Conducting party work at the 1st All-Russian Congress of Labouring Cossacks in late 1919, Obukhov was elected a member of the Central Executive Committee of the Cossack Section there. He was appointed commandant of the Krasny Kazak (Red Cossack) propaganda train on the Southern Front in March 1920, and in September was sent to command the 1st Turkestan Cavalry Regiment on the Turkestan Front. With the latter, he fought against the Emirate of Bukhara and the Basmachi movement. From March 1922, Obukhov served as an acting squadron commander in the 13th Cavalry Regiment.

== Interwar period ==
After the end of the war, Obukhov was hospitalized in Petrograd from October 1922, after which he studied at the Red Army Higher Cavalry School in that city. After graduating in September 1924, he was again sent to the Turkestan Front, where he commanded the 1st Cavalry Regiment of the 1st Separate Cavalry Brigade. From January 1925 he served as commander and commissar of the 79th Cavalry Regiment of the 7th Separate Cavalry Brigade of the Central Asian Military District, and in December 1926 became commander and commissar of the Uzbek Cavalry Regiment in Samarkand. During this period he fought against the Basmachi in Eastern Bukhara from October 1924 to December 1926 and in Khiva from 1927 to November 1928. Obukhov was awarded the Order of the Red Banner of Labour of the Uzbek SSR on 22 February 1928.

Sent to study at the Cavalry Officers Improvement Course (KUKS) in Novocherkassk in November of that year, Obukhov became commander and commissar of the 8th Cavalry Regiment of the 2nd Cavalry Division in the Ukrainian Military District after graduation in July 1929. He studied at the Frunze Military Academy from April 1931, graduating in April 1934, after which he was placed at the disposal of the Red Army Intelligence Directorate. Promoted to colonel on 16 December 1935, Obukhov served in China as a military advisor to the commander of the Xinjiang Military Region of the National Revolutionary Army between 1935 and 1937. After returning to the Soviet Union, Obukhov served with the Red Army Cavalry Inspectorate from September 1937 as an assistant and later senior assistant inspector. From May 1939 he was a staff officer in the operational department of the 1st Army Group, and from July inspector of the cavalry of the Far East front group. In the latter position he participated in the Battle of Khalkhin Gol. Promoted to kombrig on 4 November 1939, Obukhov became chief of the Borisov Cavalry School in December 1939, which was later converted into a tank school. When the Red Army reintroduced general's ranks, he was made a major general on 4 June 1940. Obukhov was appointed commander of the 26th Tank Division of the 20th Mechanized Corps of the Western Special Military District on 11 March 1941.

== World War II ==
On 22 June 1941, when Operation Barbarossa, the German invasion of the Soviet Union, began, the division and its corps advanced towards Volkovysk and Belostok. Reaching the area of Mir-Gorodishche and Gorodeya, the division received orders to occupy a defensive line along the 1939 state border in the area of Negoreloe, Stolbtsy, Gorodeya, and Nesvizh, where it took control of disparate retreating units. For four days the division fought in fierce defensive battles with advancing German units on this line, covering the direction of Minsk. Subsequently, the division was forced to retreat to Minsk and beyond the Berezina River, where it consolidated. From 28 June, division units fought in an encirclement west of Minsk in the Naliboki forest for several days. Conducting a fighting retreat over the Dnieper towards Mogilev, the units of the division tied down large German forces, being twice encircled. Near Krichev and Propoysk on the Sozh River the division spent all fuel and ammunition in intense fighting, after which Obukhov decided to destroy the remaining equipment and vehicles and head east. He did not reach Soviet lines until September, with a group of up to 1,000 troops in the area of Bryansk in the 50th Army sector.

Following his escape from behind German lines, Obukhov was appointed deputy inspector general of the Red Army cavalry on 11 September. In this position, he traveled to various fronts, and in late 1942 was on the Transcaucasian Front with the Black Sea Group of Forces. Appointed deputy commander of the 4th Guards Tank Army, forming near Moscow, on 2 March 1943, Obukhov transferred to command the 3rd Guards Mechanized Corps in May 1943; he would lead it for the rest of the war. The corps joined the 47th Army and fought in the Belgorod–Kharkov Offensive, in which it recaptured Khorol and Zolotonosha and crossed the Psel, Khorol, and Dnieper. During the offensive, on 19 August, Obukhov was severely wounded in an air attack near Sumy and temporarily replaced in command by the corps chief of staff. Obukhov was promoted to lieutenant general on 5 November 1943. From June 1944 the corps was part of the cavalry mechanized group of General Nikolay Osilkovsky as part of the 3rd Belorussian Front, with which it fought in the Vitebsk–Orsha Offensive, crossing the Berezina, establishing and holding a bridgehead, and recapturing Senno and Lepel. For his leadership of the corps, Obukhov received the title Hero of the Soviet Union and awarded the Order of Lenin on 4 July 1944. From July the corps was part of the 43rd, 4th Shock, 51st, 61st, 6th Guards, 22nd Armies of the 1st and 2nd Baltic Fronts, fighting in the later stage of Operation Bagration and the Baltic Offensive, in which Obukhov was again severely wounded near Joniškis. During this period it captured Vileyka, Smorgon, Molodechno, Vilnius, Šiauliai, Jelgava, and others, as well as participating in the elimination of the Courland Pocket. In June 1945 the corps was withdrawn to the Reserve of the Supreme High Command and fought in the Soviet invasion of Manchuria.

== Postwar ==
After the end of the war, Obukhov continued to command the corps, which was reorganized as the 3rd Guards Mechanized Division in November 1945. From May 1946 he served as deputy commander of the 10th Mechanized Army, and from March 1947 was chief of the armored and mechanized forces combat training department as well as assistant commander-in-chief of the Ground Forces for armored and mechanized forces. From August of the latter year Obukhov commanded the 4th Guards Separate Cadre Tank Division of the Group of Soviet Occupation Forces in Germany, which was expanded into the 4th Guards Mechanized Army in March 1950. Sent to the Voroshilov Higher Military Academy in December 1950 for Higher Academic Courses, upon graduation in December 1952 Obukhov was named assistant commander of the Carpathian Military District. From October 1953 he commanded the 3rd Guards Mechanized Army, which was designated the 18th Guards Army in April 1957. Obukhov received a promotion to colonel general on 8 August 1955. In April 1958 he was appointed the deputy chief of the Armored Forces of the Soviet Armed Forces, a position that became deputy chief of tank troops in January 1961. Obukhov retired in September 1965 and lived in Moscow. He wrote a volume of memoirs about his experiences during the Russian Civil War, Radi nashego shchastya (For the Sake of Our Happiness), published by DOSAAF in 1972. Obukhov died on 26 November 1975. He was buried at the Novodevichy Cemetery.

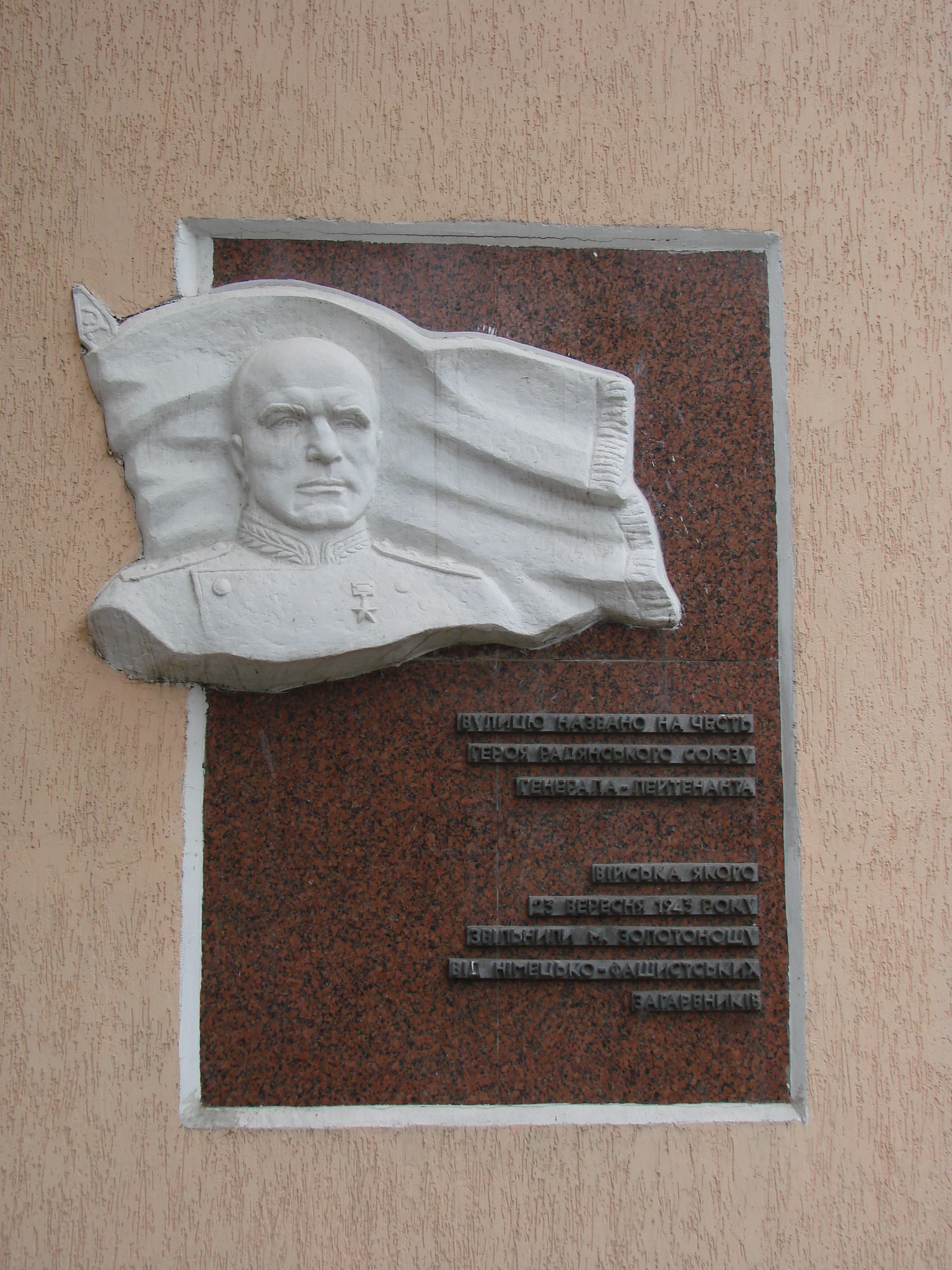
Bas-Relief of Obukhov on a plaque in Zolotonosha

== Awards and honors ==
- Hero of the Soviet Union
- Order of Lenin (3)
- Order of the Red Banner (3)
- Order of Suvorov, 1st class
- Order of the Patriotic War, 1st class
- Order of the Red Star
- Order of the Red Banner of Labour of the Uzbek SSR
- Honorary citizen of Akhtubinsk, Vilnius, Zolotonosha, and Smorgon
