= 302nd Rifle Division =

- Active: 1941–1945
- Country: Soviet Union
- Branch: Red Army
- Type: Infantry
- Size: Division
- Engagements: World War II; Battle of the Kerch Peninsula; Battle of Stalingrad; Operation Uranus; Operation Winter Storm; Donbas Strategic Offensive; Lower Dniepr Offensive; Kamenets-Podolsky Pocket; Lvov–Sandomierz Offensive; Vistula-Oder Offensive
- Decorations: Order of the Red Banner; Order of Kutuzov
- Battle honours: Ternopol

Commanders
- Notable commanders: Mikhail Zubkov; Yefrem Makarchuk; Aleksey Rodionov; Nikolai Kucherenko

The 302nd Rifle Division began service as a specialized Red Army mountain rifle division, which saw service in the disastrous operations in the Crimea in early 1942. It was later converted to serve for the balance of the war as a standard rifle division. The division played a leading role in the 51st Army's breakthrough south of Stalingrad in the opening stages of Operation Uranus, and then in the exploitation following this success; however, it was badly battered and routed in the initial stage of the German Operation Winter Storm. After recovering from this, the division continued to turn in a creditable record of service in the southern sectors of the Soviet-German front for the duration, and was especially recognized for its role in the liberation of the city of Ternopol, for which it received that city's name as an honorific.

== 1st Formation ==
The division originally began forming on July 18, 1941 at Krasnodar in the North Caucasus Military District as a mountain rifle division with a specialized order of battle featuring rifle regiments made up of oversized companies (no battalion structure), with supporting arms, capable of independent operations in difficult terrain and backed by light and mobile mountain artillery. Its order of battle was as follows:

- 823rd Mountain Rifle Regiment
- 825th Mountain Rifle Regiment
- 827th Mountain Rifle Regiment
- 831st Mountain Rifle Regiment
- 865th Mountain Artillery Regiment

Col. Mikhail Konstantinovich Zubkov was assigned as commanding officer on the day the division began forming. Note that as a mountain rifle division it had one more rifle regiment than a standard rifle division. The 302nd was the only mountain rifle division formed from reservists in the early months of the war, and spent until November forming up, an unusually long time in this period of crisis, probably due to lack of specialized training and/or equipment. Its reconnaissance unit included some BT-5 and T-26 light tanks which implies, at least, that it was being equipped with what was available rather than what was authorized.

In November it was assigned to the 51st Army, and saw its first action at the very end of the year. On December 26, elements of the division made opposed amphibious landings from improvised landing craft at Kamysh Burun and at Eltigen south of the town of Kerch on the eastern tip of the Crimea. In spite of heavy German fire, a foothold of 2,175 troops was established at the former port, although the latter attempt was repulsed. A second wave of Soviet landings took place farther west on December 29, and the city of Feodosiya was liberated by units of the 44th Army. Following this, the German corps commander ordered his 46th Infantry Division to retreat from the Kerch Peninsula without orders from above. As a result, the 302nd was able to liberate Kerch on December 31.

On January 15, 1942, General von Manstein launched a counter-offensive to try to retake Feyodosiya. Over the next five days, the 44th Army was defeated and forced to retreat to the Parpach Narrows. Despite the 302nd managing to repulse an attack on the road and rail hub of Vladislavovka on the 19th, the 51st Army was forced to fall back as well. The German attack subsided as the shorter line was reached, allowing the Soviets to free up reserves. During the lull on this front over the following months, the division went into reserve and was reorganized as a standard rifle division on March 31.

== 2nd Formation ==
As a result of its conversion to a standard rifle division, its order of battle was revised as follows:

- 823rd Rifle Regiment from 823rd Mountain Rifle Regiment
- 825th Rifle Regiment from 825th Mountain Rifle Regiment
- 827th Rifle Regiment from 827th Mountain Rifle Regiment
- 865th Artillery Regiment from 865th Mountain Artillery Regiment
- 231st Antitank Battalion (renumbered as 232nd on November 19, 1943)
- 634th Signal Battalion
- 601st Sapper Battalion
- 248th Reconnaissance Company

Colonel Zubkov remained in command. During this conversion the division was reassigned to the 44th Army.

=== Battle of Kerch ===
Shortly after this conversion process was complete, on May 8 Manstein's Eleventh Army began its attack into the Kerch peninsula. The 302nd escaped relatively intact, evacuating to the North Caucasus, still in what remained of the 44th Army in the North Caucasus Front. In July the division was sent north, and rejoined the 51st Army, now in the Stalingrad Front. On August 9, Colonel Zubkov was replaced in command by Col. Aleksei Fyodorovich Amenev, but this officer in turn was replaced by Col. Yefrem Fedosievich Makarchuk one month later.

== Battle of Stalingrad ==
When Stalingrad Front launched the southern offensive of Operation Uranus on November 20, the 302nd was one of the assault divisions that broke open the defending Romanian 6th Corps and supporting German elements, alongside the 126th Rifle Division. The two divisions were supported by the 254th Tank Brigade when the attack launched at 0845 hours, facing strong resistance from several Romanian strong points. Shortly after the initial assault the 4th Mechanized Corps (Soviet Union) sent its 55th and 158th Tank Regiments to reinforce the rifle divisions and accelerate the advance. The two tank regiments advanced through the 302nd, blasting through the Romanian defenses with ease, and advancing up to 10km by 1300 hours. Further advances allowed the 13th Mechanized Corps to break into the clear and complete the encirclement of the German 6th Army.

On December 12, the division was helping to man a thin line across the steppes when the German Army Group Don launched its effort to relieve and rescue the trapped 6th Army, called Operation Winter Storm. The 302nd's main position at Nebykov came under attack from the 23rd Panzer Division, which captured the village at 1335 hours; the Germans reported that the division had fled northeast with about 3,000 men, leaving behind many dead, 250 prisoners, and a good deal of weapons and equipment. Its headquarters was captured, and its deputy commander for political affairs, Lt. Col. P. P. Medvedev, was killed by an antitank grenade. The remnants of the 302nd reorganized over the coming days along the right flank of the German thrust, which aimed at Verkhne-Kumskii, beyond the Aksai River.

Later in December, while continuing the push towards Rostov-na-Donu and the Donbas, the division, along with the rest of the 51st Army, were transferred to the South Front, remaining there until July, 1943. On January 12, 1943, Colonel Makarchuk was mortally wounded in a German airstrike; he was replaced by Col. Victor Fyodorovich Stenshinskiy who had been serving in the headquarters of Southern Front. The following day 51st Army issued a combat report which gave the division's status as follows:

"302nd RD's strength is 280 [riflemen and sappers], 12 76mm guns, 2 45mm guns, 9 82mm mortars, 2 120mm mortars, and 5 DShKs. 825th RR, fighting in the center of Uspenskii, and 827th RR, fighting for Privolnyi, were counterattacked by 18 enemy tanks and infantry from Ukrainskii. The attack was repelled with three tanks destroyed and one burned."

The remaining rifle divisions in the Army are shown in this report as even lower in terms of riflemen and sappers. Colonel Stenshinskiy was in turn replaced in command by Col. Aleksei Pavlovich Rodionov on February 2.

=== Donbas Offensive ===
In July the 302nd was moved into the Reserve of the Supreme High Command, then into South Front reserves. The division was substantially rebuilt during these months. Following a transfer to the 2nd Guards Army in September it briefly participated in the Donbas Strategic Offensive, and then in the Lower Dniepr Offensive, remaining in this Front (after October 20 named the 4th Ukrainian Front) until the end of the year. On October 2, Colonel Rodionov handed command over to Col. Nikolai Panteleimonovich Kucherenko, who would remain in this post until his death in March, 1945.

== Advance ==
At the end of 1943 the division was once more in the Reserve of the Supreme High Command, now moving north to an assignment with the 47th Army of the 1st Ukrainian Front. It would remain in this Front until just before the end of the war. By the beginning of March, 1944, the 302nd was assigned to the 106th Rifle Corps of the 60th Army. During the final stage of the Battle of the Kamenets-Podolsky pocket, on April 15, the men and women of the division distinguished themselves in the liberation of Ternopol, for which they received the name of that city as an honorific:

"TERNOPOL"... 302 Rifle Division (Colonel Nikolai Panteleimonovich Kucherenko)... The troops who participated in the liberation of Ternopol, by the order of the Supreme High Command of 15 April 1944, and a commendation in Moscow, are given a salute of 20 artillery salvos from 224 guns."

Colonel Kucherenko was also awarded the Order of the Red Banner for "his able leadership and personal courage" in the course of this action.

In July the division was moved to the 28th Rifle Corps, still in the 60th Army where it remained for the duration of the war. On August 10 the division was recognized for its role in the liberation of Lviv with the award of the Order of the Red Banner. In the final weeks of the war 60th Army was moved to the 4th Ukrainian Front, fighting its way through eastern Czechoslovakia. On March 30, 1945, Colonel Kucherenko was killed in action by enemy artillery in the fighting along the Oder River south of Wrocław, and was subsequently named a Hero of the Soviet Union. He was succeeded in command by his deputy commander, Lt. Col. Pyotr Dmitrievich Gorodnii for two weeks, then by Col. Aleksandr Yakovlevich Klimenko for the final month of hostilities. On April 26 the division was further distinguished for its role in fighting near Oppeln with the award of the Order of Kutuzov, 2nd degree.

The 302nd Rifle Division finished the war near Prague, as a separate division in the 60th Army, carrying the full title of 302nd Rifle, Ternopol, Order of the Red Banner, Order of Kutuzov Division. (Russian: 302-я стрелковая Тернопольская Краснознамённая ордена Кутузова дивизия.) The division was disbanded "in place" with the Northern Group of Forces during the summer of 1945.

== Heroes of the Soviet Union ==
Four men of the 302nd Rifle Division earned the Gold Star Hero of the Soviet Union, all posthumously:

- Major I.M. Grishunov, commander of the 865th Artillery Regiment. Awarded November 1, 1943.
- Private A.P. Zhivov of the 827th Rifle Regiment, who blocked the embrasure of a German bunker with his body during the liberation of Ternopol. Awarded December 23, 1944.
- Private V.V. Kurbatov of the 825th Rifle Regiment, for valorous conduct during a river-crossing operation, even after being wounded, on January 14, 1945. Awarded June 29, 1945.
- Colonel N.P. Kucherenko, divisional commander, for his valorous command before his death in action, March 30, 1945. Awarded April 6, 1945.
