= Olya, Russia =

Olya Оля
- Selo
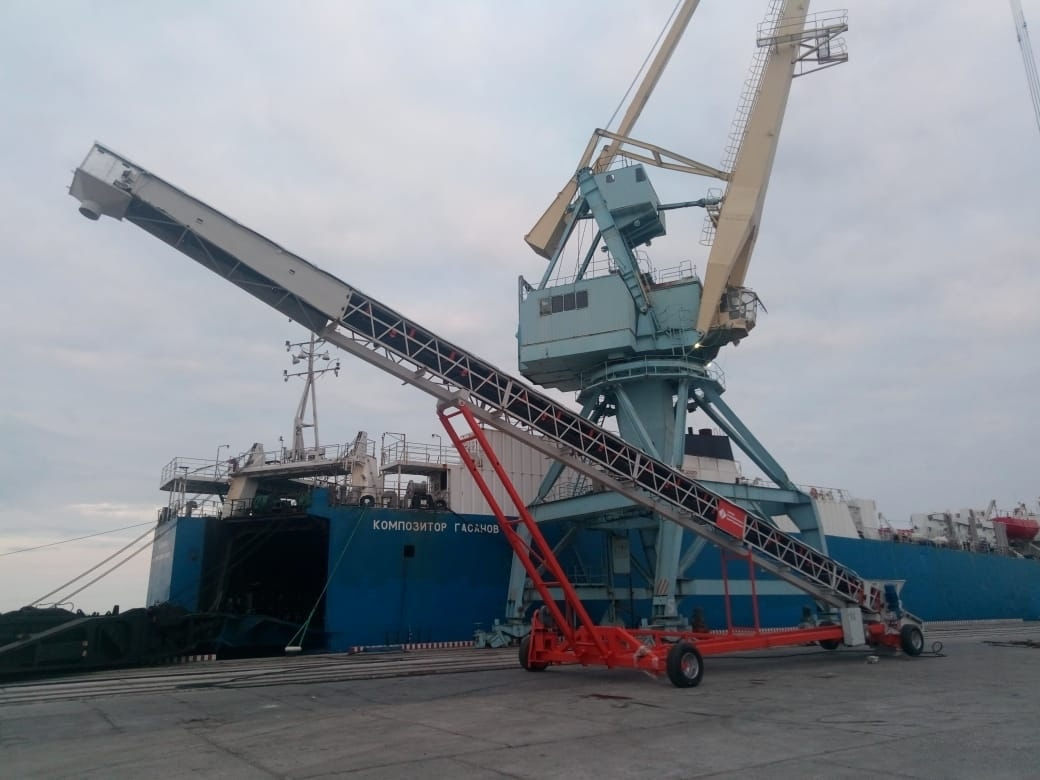
- Interactive map of Olya
- Location of Olya Olya (Astrakhan Oblast)
- Coordinates: 45°47′06″N 47°32′02″E
- Country: Russia
- Federal subject: Astrakhan Oblast
- Administrative district: Limansky District
- Selsoviet: Olinsky Selsoviet

Population
  - Estimate (2005): 3,752 )

Municipal status
  - Municipal district: Limansky Municipal District
  - Rural settlement: Olinsky Rural Settlement
- Time zone: UTC+4 (MSK+1)
- Postal code: 416425
- Dialing code: +7 85147
- OKTMO ID: 12635436101

Olya (Russian: Оля) is a rural locality (a selo) in Limansky District of Astrakhan Oblast, Russia, on the shore of one of the largest branches of the Volga River, Bakhtemir, near the Caspian Sea about 120 kilometers (75 mi) southwest of Astrakhan. It serves as a port on the Caspian Sea. In 2010 the settlement recorded 1372 farmsteads and 3752 residents. The port's cargo turnover was approximately 2.5 million tons as of 2006.

== History ==
Olya is one of the oldest fishing villages in Astrakhan Oblast. The word Olya, which is of Kalmyk origin, means small hatchet describing the shape of the island on which Olya was originally located. Other villages are also on the islands, to the south and west, all separated by small channels. Chantais two kilometers south while Karantina is three kilometers southwest. Olya was originally between the coast and the mouth of the Bakhtimir, but the sea and the river receded and eventually the small channels separating the villages silted up. Olya and villages around it gradually merged with each other, forming a locality on maps designated as the village of Olya. Local names for different parts of the village include Forest for the southern part and Korya in the southwest. The name Olya refers to the northern part of town, directly adjacent to Bakhtemir.

== Physical features ==
=== Terrain ===
An important role in shaping the terrain has always played a Caspian Sea, which level is constantly rising and falling. In prehistoric times the whole area was flooded and about 15 thousand years ago the sea receded. The settlement and its surroundings are located on the depositional plain below sea level, as most of the Astrakhan Oblast. A notable feature of the plains are Baer knolls. Vestigial lakes (local name: ilmens, ильмени) are located between the ridges of these knolls: Big Chada (the largest ilmen in the vicinity of the settlement), Little Chada, Zaburunny, Big Rusnur, Small Rusnur, Gyunhara, Solyony, Sazaniy, Korsunkin, etc.

=== Soils ===
On the territory of the settlement is dominated by brown semidesert soils. For crops such soils should be further fertilize and irrigate. Also there are sandy soils.

=== Flora ===
In the distance from the water flora rather scanty and represented dwarf grasses: Wormwood, thistle couch sedge, and prostrate summer cypress etc. There are also pockets of bush zhidovilnika. Semi-aquatic vegetation is represented by reed and chakanom forming impassable thickets. Many Erik entirely covered with thickets zhidovilnika. Among the trees are numerous willow and elm.

=== Climate ===
Climate Olya moderate continental, dry. The air temperature about 2-3 °C higher than in the regional center. For the territory is characterized by constant wind. Spring (March, April) begins to blow south wind - the sea. Wind picks up a lot of sand and dust, sometimes creating poor visibility. Winds begin to subside with the first rains. In May–June has the greatest amount of precipitation in the form of torrential rains, sometimes with rain. In the second half of the summer starts winds, which continues until the end of September. The hottest period from mid-summer to mid-September, is characterized by low rainfall. Fall is usually dry and warm. The first frosts occur in early November. Winters are mild. In view of the continental climate, the weather is uncertain: often severe frost thaws replaced.

=== Ecology ===
Sleeve Volga Bakhtemir is the main supplier of drinking and irrigation water to Olga, and serves as a migration through for walk-through and semi-migratory fish. The main source of pollution is Bakhtemir port, as well as freighters and river boats. In water contaminant heavy metals and petroleum products. The excess of the norm a small but growing concern is the capacity of the port, which will lead to a deterioration in water quality due to the receipt of pollutants.

For some soil characteristic leaching. Measurements have shown a slight excess of the highway from the norm. A large contribution to air pollution contributes a growing number of motor vehicles and rail transport.

Eric Chantinka flowing through the town, has a poor condition. Pollution by heavy metals exceeds 1.5 times the performance of Bakhtemir. Eric recorded in excess of normal pathogens. Most likely this is due to the uncontrolled release of waste directly into the Erik. The dismal state of the territory of the settlement associated with natural dump household garbage. Therefore, it is important to the administration to carry out actions on the obstruction of landfills, and conversations with people, campaigning for maintaining the frequency of settlement and surrounding areas.

== Port Olya ==
In the difficult period of ongoing global change in Russia - the geopolitical, social, economic, as well as in connection with the political situation created when Russia was left without a "sea gates" at the Caspian Sea, there was a need for the merchant fleet and the creation of Flotilla base in the region. After the preliminary design study for the construction of the future port site was chosen near the village of Olga Liman district in the Volga-Caspian canal Astrakhan Oblast. The project is implemented port Moscow Institute "Soyuzmorniiproekt."

Construction of the port began with the adoption of decrees of the President of Russia from 31.10.92, No. 1314 "On State Support for the revival of the Russian merchant fleet in the Caspian Sea," from 03.12.92, No. 1513 "On measures to revitalize the merchant fleet of Russia" program of revival of trade fleet of Russia in 1993–2000, approved by the Government of Russia from 08.10.93, No. 996.

June 3, 1997 was put into operation the first port with a capacity of cargo handling about 400 tons per year. In the second half of the 1990s to the docks from the highway, Olja Zaburunye Lyman was built access road of major types of length of 3 km. Roads in the "Outpost" is connected with the road P215 znacheniya. V nationwide January 2006, during the reorganization of the ownership of Federal State Unitary Enterprise "North Caspian Sea Shipping Company", the sale of port property and the procedures for bankruptcy was established Open Joint Stock Company "Sea Commercial Port of Olga." January 29, 2009, the EGM decided to rename the Open Joint Stock Company "Sea Commercial Port Olya" in the Open Joint Stock Company "First Stevedoring Company", which is the successor of Open Joint Stock Company "Sea Commercial Port of Olga". The purpose of the Society is the restoration of stevedoring activities in the existing port facilities and the project of multifunctional sea port in the south, one of the new ports in Russia, involving both public and private capital. Stevedoring company - the company that owns a berth in the port, and it carries Handling on this dock. In April 2006, the capacity of the port is 2.5 million tons. At the end of 2008, in a year-round has four berths with a depth of 5.0 meters at the pier, just the first of two planned commercial areas will be 13 berths. As a result of 2009, the company had profits amounting to 895 thousand rubles. Which is almost 36 times greater than in 2008 year. Part of the object is federally owned and administered by "Rosmorport". In addition to federal funds for construction of the port is enabled as a substantial part of private investment. Investor of private facilities in the port of Olya is CJSC "Commercial Sea port of Olya" (termed earlier - CJSC "Industrial investments"). The main developer of the port is OOO "Ola construction company."

The basic form of port - transhipment general shipping containers and the car ferry cargo. Advantageous geographical location creates conditions for the cargo transshipments year-round, provides access to the river, sea, road and railways. After his year-round reloaded foreign trade goods of the following Caspian Sea in Iran, Turkmenistan, Kazakhstan, the Indian ways. The port is open to international shipping, there are border checkpoints, and Customs posts. Basically, all the berths are located frontally along the coastline. The construction of berthing front provided on both sides of the existing berths No. 1,2,3 shore at the site of the village of Olga to Caspian Canal. Berths No. 4,5, including the backcourt, form a single complex - Terminal rolling cargo. Hydraulic construction - berth number 5 - is included in the general scheme of construction and development of commercial sea port of Olya, which is funded from the federal budget.

The development of international trade port Olya is a key project that can change the balance of traffic flows passing through the Caspian Sea region. Among the advantages of the port - maximum proximity to the Caspian Sea, the large free area for development; unlimited opportunities for growth in port capacity, the introduction of modern technologies of intensive processing of goods for the engineering and transportation.

Olya was designed and created as one of the projects that make up the trade relationship with the Iran. During the 2009 year through the port handled 773 thousand tons of foreign cargo. In import of Iran is dominated by fruits and nuts, as well as food processing vegetables and fruit. The structure of the Russian transport export cargo through the port of Olya in recent years shows quite well-established range of goods: metal, sawn timber Paper. In particular, one of the "running" of the Russian export cargo - grain - it will be possible transshipment in port after the introduction of the grain terminal, whose construction began in late April 2010 year. Starting capacity of this complex will be 500 thousand tons per year, with a consequent increase in the full development of up to 1 million tons. Simultaneous storage capacity up 36.6 thousand tons of construction completion scheduled for late 2010 year. Another export cargo coming in Iran - vegetable oil. Under his handling at the port terminal under construction with capacity of 10-12 tons per month (berth number 6), its entry is also planned for the 2010 year. For dry cargoes, in particular, iron, designed the first cargo seaport area, which is located on the shore Bakhtemir and immediately adjacent to the south to the village of Olga. At present, the port takes timber, oil, ferrous metals, grain, chemicals, automobiles, paper and other goods.

Development of the Russian port of Astrakhan Oblast will create an effective element for the functioning of the international transport corridor "North-South" and change the balance of traffic flows passing through the region Caspian Sea. It will facilitate the involvement of Russia and other countries in the process of world trade, as well as send some traffic from the EU in South Asia through the Central Asian and Middle Eastern states.

Olya port on the Caspian Sea is promising for developing a port for all types of cargo with volumes of transshipment, as predicted by "Rosmorport" to 2020, at least 10 million tons. Gradually, he will take on a cargo handled at terminals in the Astrakhan (about 3.5-5 million tons). Port area of 250-300 ha can count on such developments. While another nearby Makhachkala port will be developed in collaboration with the port. At the same time, the Dagestani port will retain the transshipment of oil cargo. Planned throughput for the liquid cargo in the port of Makhachkala reaches 15 million tons. Establishment of an expanded port. Infrastructure in the future will be one of the main advantages of the port of Olya, compared with the existing ports of the Caspian Sea. Currently existing port facilities of the Russian coast of the Caspian Sea is clearly not cope with growing freight traffic. The new port can be a good alternative for the construction of marine terminals in this area. In 2010, the turnover of Olga may have reached 1 million tonnes due to working with metals, and building materials. Further intensive development of offshore oil fields in the Caspian Sea, as the Russians and other countries will be an additional incentive for the development of regional port infrastructure. Planned opening of the inland waterways of Russia (mainly the southern half rings of Astrakhan, Olya to Rostov) can significantly enhance the role of the Russian Caspian Sea ports. Ports will be able to transit goods of other countries, in particular, Kazakhstan, actively building a private fleet. With the commissioning of berths and port infrastructure had placed high hopes on the socio-economic development of southern Russia, Astrakhan Oblast and the entire transportation system. Prospective turnover after construction can take up to 30 million tons per year. This volume of goods subject to possible diversion of transit Europe - Iran, which is now done through the Suez Canal.

== Transportation ==
=== Intercity transport ===
Olya is associated with the regional center of a highway, which in turn is connected to Astrakhan federal highway Lyman Makhachkala. Passenger traffic carried by road in Lyman and Astrakhan. Flights from the bus made daily.

=== Rail ===
In 2001, the port Olya was included in the Federal Target Program "Modernization of Russian transport system." In 2004, the railroad was built by the railway branch length of 55 kilometers from the station to Yandyki port railway station "Port Olya", connecting the port with the Volga Railway. Through the station "Port Olya" carry freight.

The railway branch was constructed in the shortest possible time. In order to ensure the commissioning of the station and ferrying it was constructed simultaneously from both sides. Unloaded at the station Yandyki rail-shpalnye bars on heavy vehicles were taken to build power stations Olga. Transported to the same puteukladchik went to the station Yandyki collecting railway line. Station port Olya, sludge and the way the way to go port berths were built at the same time. Administrative building of the station was equipped with the necessary means of communication with computers, office equipment, conditions for eating the station employees.

In July 2004, the opening ceremony of the railway line Yandyki - Port Olya. Less than a year approach station Olga received the status of the tariff. However, one can not ignore the problems of this branch is closely related to the development of the port. Port can not handle the unloading of the stated and arrived at his address of wagons, which greatly complicates the work of Astrakhan site. Easy cars awaiting unloading on average 15 days (December 2007).

=== Ferry ===
In 2000, the regular open ferry with the cities of Turkmenbashi (Turkmenistan) and Anzali (Iran). On 2005 year ferry service is available with the city Baku (Azerbaijan), Turkmenbashi (Turkmenistan), Aktau (Kazakhstan), Anzali (Iran).

== City status ==
The concept of settlement carried out Urban Institute (1993). The concept provides for the appropriation status of the settlement "the city of Olga." The positive trend of increasing cargo and increase the area of port development create conditions to attract workers. First of all staff recruited from local residents. With the advent of large investments in port, there is hope for improvement of infrastructure (road repair, landscaping, small business development, social development, etc.). Employment and improvement of living conditions will significantly increase the growth of the local population.

Preliminary number of village Olya (the future of the city) in the "Concept" was set at 13.0 thousand inhabitants. However, given the experience of similar structures (in Russia and abroad), is currently difficult to predict the intensity of development of settlements in the future, and in this project, tentatively, the population is taken in $20.0 thousand. Planning, organization and conditions for the development of maritime ports in the region as well as areas for development of the city is. Currently, a General Plan for Human Settlements s. Lesnoe, s. Basta and s. Olya MO "Ola village council" in the future city of Olya.

As part of the project is aimed at the port waters of port facilities with a total length of berths about 5 km, reservation areas for possible development in the area of industrial and commercial facilities and warehouses for transshipment and other goods. In addition, they plan to strengthen the role of the district center (village Lyman) and the strengthening of the reference frame formed settlements on the basis of organizational and business functions support centers settlement systems. The future will remain 24 rural settlements, due to a small sseleniya (p. Zaburunny) and three small towns, which will be part of the new city.

Alexander Zhilkin, in turn, encouraged the youth to acquire knowledge and to return to their village to develop it:

A few years later Olga could turn into a nice little town. Olya for the Astrakhan region - is not only one of the settlements, a large economic unit. It features the largest transportation hub - the port, focus the interests of many energy projects. Olya village - is the port, the fishing industry, the shipping line, which will be held here.

== Notes ==
1. JSC "Sea Commercial Port of Olga". "Official website of the port of Olya".
2. Oao "Rzd". "International Transport Corridor "North-South"". Archived from the original on January 14, 2004.
3. RIA Novosti (April 8, 2006). "Port of Olya in the Astrakhan region can claim the status of SEZ".
4. Trucker Line-O. "Ro-Ro ferry freight line Olya". Archived from the original on March 31, 2012.
5. REGNUM. "The construction of a fourth berth Astrakhan port of Olya". Archived from the original on October 10, 2012.
6. Tehran Times (February 2009). "Seven sister-city agreements with foreign ports inked: Iranian official".

== Sister cities ==
- Bandar-e Anzali, Iran
