= 4th Mechanized Corps =

4th Mechanized Corps (1941 – Dec 1942) 3rd Guards Mechanized Corps (1942–1945) 3rd Guards Mechanized Division (c. 1946 – 1957) 47th Guards Motor Rifle Division (1957–1959)
- Active: 1941–1959
- Country: Soviet Union
- Branch: Armoured Forces
- Type: Corps
- Engagements: Operation Uranus; Operation Bagration; Baltic Offensive; Invasion of Manchuria

Commanders
- Notable commanders: Andrey Vlasov; Vasily Volsky; Viktor Obukhov

The 4th Mechanized Corps was a formation in the Soviet Red Army during the Second World War.

== Operation Barbarossa ==
Initially formed in January 1941, it served with the 6th Army, Kiev Special Military District, under the command of General Major Andrey Vlasov when the German Operation Barbarossa began in June 1941. On 22 June 1941 4th Mechanised Corps consisted of 28,098 soldiers and 979 tanks. It initially comprised the 8th and 32nd Tank Divisions, the 81st Mechanised Division, the 3rd Motorcycle Regiment, and other, smaller units. It fought in the Battle of Brody,^{b} and was destroyed in the Uman Pocket in August 1941 with the 6th Army and was disbanded shortly after.

== The second formation in 1942 ==
The corps was reformed in September 1942. It was commanded by General Vasily Volsky during the Battle of Stalingrad in 1942. The corps entered the sector south of Stalingrad as part of Operation Uranus.

The plan was to attack through the 51st Army's sector to break through the Romanian Fourth Army led by Constantin Constantinescu to help encircle the Germans in Stalingrad. On 20 November 1942, the corps started feeding its units into the attack, between Lake Tsatsa and Barmatsak when the 126th and 302nd Rifle Divisions of the 51st Army began to advance on a three-mile front, supported by the 55th and 158th Independent Tank Regiments from the 4th Mechanized Corps. The advance was made against the Romanian 6th Corps, whose units, Erickson says, began to surrender as the tanks got in among their positions.

The corps's main attack opened late, further down the line, with three mechanized brigades hugging one road instead of the planned three, and the left-flank brigades, the 36th and 59th, running into minefields. However the attack went on, until a pause at Zety on the evening on 21 November for fuel and ammunition. On the morning of 23 November, the 4th Mechanized Corps linked up with 4th and 26th Tank Corps in the Sovietskii-Marinovka area, and the northern and southern pincers had met. The German Sixth Army was surrounded in Stalingrad.

In December 1942, the corps gained a Guards title and became the 3rd Guards Mechanised Corps. It fought at the Battle of Kursk as part of Steppe Front. In June 1944, for Operation Bagration, it was assigned to Chernyakhovsky's 3rd Belorussian Front as part of a Cavalry Mechanized Group which also included the 3rd Cavalry Corps and was tasked to attack Bogushevsk in conjunction with the 5th and 39th Armies. Its units included the 64th Guards Heavy Tank Regiment, which operated IS-2 heavy tanks while fighting as part of the 1st Baltic Front in the Šiauliai area during July 1944. It was then moved to the Far East and took part in the invasion of Manchuria as part of the Transbaikal Front.

== Post-war ==
The corps, which gained the honorific Stalingrad-Krivorozhskaya, became the 3rd Guards Mechanised Division in November 1945, and the 47th Guards Motor Rifle Division in 1957. It was finally disbanded on 27 November 1959 while serving with the 5th Army in the Far East Military District at Dalnerechensk.

== Commanders ==
- Major General of Tank Troops Mikhail Ivanovich Potapov (4 June 1940 – 17 January 1941)
- Major General Andrey Andreevich Vlasov (17 January 1941 – July 1941)
- Major General of Tank Troops Georgy Rodin (18 September 1942 – 24 October 1942)
- Major-General of Tank Troops Vasily Volsky (24 October 1942 – 3 January 1943)
- Major General Alexey Pavlovich Sharagin (3 January 1943 – 3 May 1943), seriously wounded in May 1943, died of his wounds on 22 December 1943
- Major General of Tank Troops, later Lieutenant General of Tank Troops Viktor Obukhov (4 May 1943 – end of the war)

== Footnotes ==
- ^{b} On 7 July 1941 Colonel General Kirponos South West Front Commander reported to Stavka that the 4th Mechanised Corps consisted of 126 Tanks & on 15 July 1941 68 Tanks (6 KV-1s, 39 T-34s, 23 BT-7s).
