= Nikopol–Krivoi Rog offensive =

Russian military offensive (1944)

Coordinates: 47.697°N 33.980°E

- Part of the Dnieper–Carpathian offensive on the Eastern Front of World War II
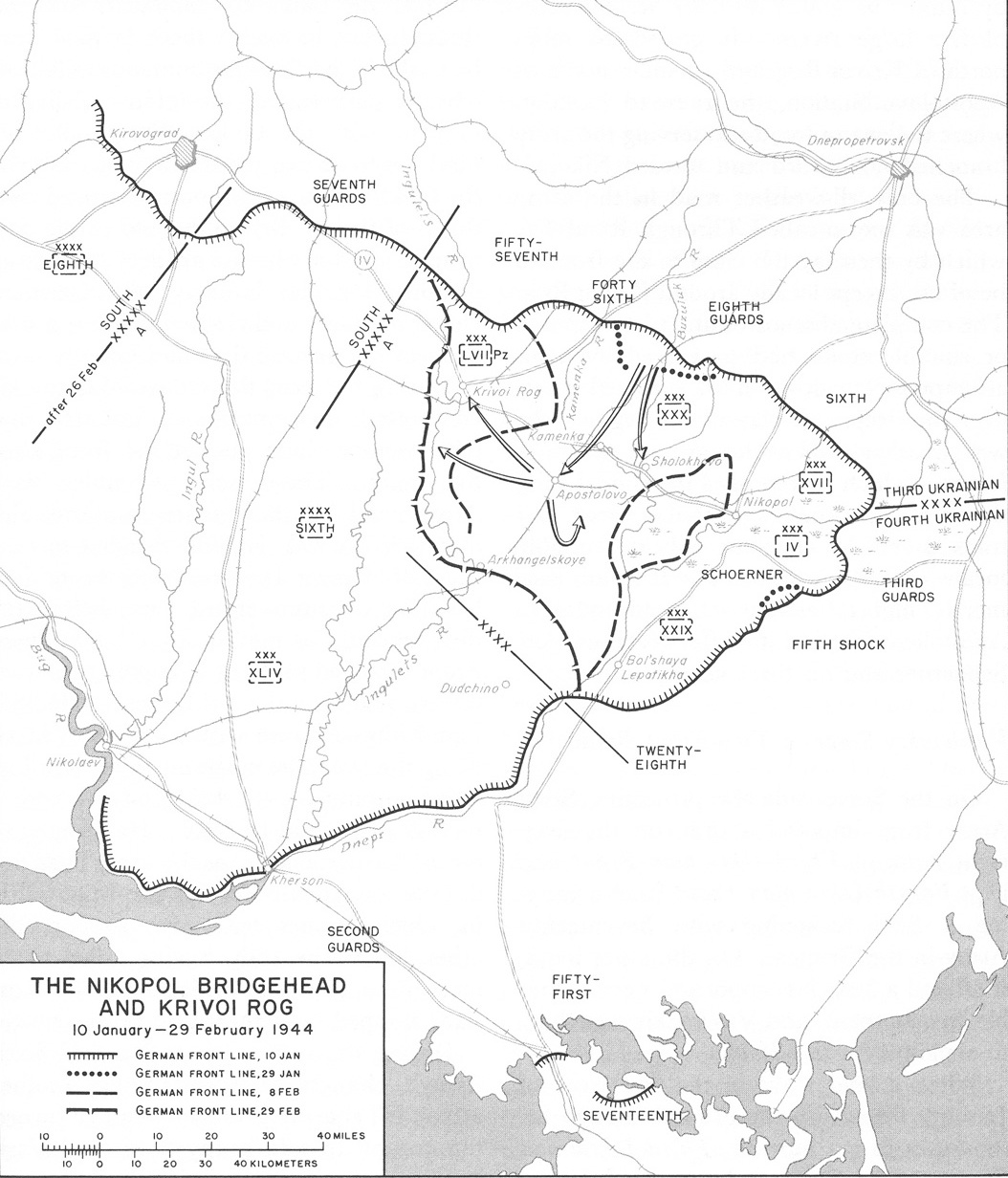
- Nikopol bridgehead and Krivoi Rog frontlines
Date	30 January – 29 February 1944
Location	Nikopol and Krivoi Rog area, Dnipropetrovsk Oblast, Ukrainian SSR
Result	Soviet victory

Belligerents
Germany	Soviet Union

Commanders and leaders
Erich von Manstein; Ewald von Kleist; Karl-Adolf Hollidt	Rodion Malinovsky; Fyodor Tolbukhin

Units involved
(Nazi Germany) 6th Army	(Soviet Union) 3rd Ukrainian Front (Soviet Union) 4th Ukrainian Front

Strength
260,000; 480 tanks 6,420 artillery pieces 560 aircraft 6th Army infantry combat strength, 29 January 1944: 47,646 troops in total	705,000; 390 tanks 8,048 artillery pieces 1,340 aircraft

Casualties and losses
6th Army High Command report for February 1944: 3,302 killed; 11,707 wounded; 4,281 missing; 5,588 sick; 24,878 in total 6th Army irrecoverable motor vehicle losses in February 1944: 8,200 trucks; 2,900 passenger cars; 650 prime movers; 2,400 motorcycles; 1,130 motor vehicle trailers	Unknown

The Nikopol–Krivoi Rog offensive (Russian: Никопольско-Криворожская наступательная операция), known on the German side as the winter battles of the 6th Army in the great Dnieper bend in the Nikopol bridgehead and in the area of Nikopol - Apostolovo - Krivoy Rog (German: Winterschlachten der 6. Armee im großen Dnjepr-Bogen im Brückenkopf Nikopol und im Raum Nikopol - Apostolowo - Kriwoj-Rog), was an offensive by the Red Army's 3rd Ukrainian Front and elements of the 4th Ukrainian Front against the German 6th Army in the area of Nikopol and Krivoi Rog in Dnipropetrovsk Oblast in central Ukraine between 30 January and 29 February 1944. It took place on the Eastern Front of World War II and was part of the wider Dnieper–Carpathian offensive, a Soviet attack against Army Group South to retake the rest of Ukraine that fell to Germany in 1941.

Following the Soviet advance to the Dnieper in the Battle of the Dnieper during late 1943, German forces managed to hold to the Nikopol bridgehead on the left bank of the Dnieper, the area of manganese ore mines of crucial importance to German war production that Adolf Hitler insisted on holding.

In November and December, the 3rd and 4th Ukrainian Fronts conducted multiple unsuccessful attacks against the bridgehead, a salient centered around the supply base and rail junction of Apostolovo, and German troops in the Krivoi Rog area. Following another failed attack in mid-January, the Nikopol–Krivoy Rog offensive was launched by the 3rd Ukrainian Front to the north of the salient on 30 January, and elements of the 4th Ukrainian Front to the south of it joined in a day later.

The Soviet troops broke through the 6th Army's lines, capturing Apostolovo on 5 February, splitting the army in half. Nikopol fell on 8 February, but despite heavy losses the troops in the bridgehead, including the German IV Army Corps, were able to retreat across the Dnieper. The IV Army Corps launched an unsuccessful counterattack against Apostolovo around this time, resulting in a temporary Soviet pause in order to prepare for the advance against Krivoi Rog, in the northwest portion of the salient.

Two armies of the 3rd Ukrainian Front began the advance towards that city on 17 February, and captured it on 22 February. Other armies from the front then resumed the advance and captured several bridgeheads over the Inhulets river, which became the next German defensive line. Fighting in the area died down, but the Soviet gains paved the way for subsequent advances during the second phase of the Dnieper–Carpathian offensive. The offensive resulted in the loss of the German salient and at least 25,000 total casualties being inflicted on the units of 6th Army in the fighting. Due to heavy personnel and material losses, most of the divisions of the 6th Army were greatly reduced in their combat effectiveness after this offensive, being fit for limited defensive operations only. 6th Army was given little respite, as Soviets launched the Bereznegovatoye–Snigirevka offensive one week later and the German Inhulets river front soon collapsed.

== Background ==
Following the Soviet advance in the Battle of the Dnieper in late 1943, the German 6th Army, commanded by Generaloberst Karl-Adolf Hollidt, escaped a threatened Soviet encirclement and retreated to the Krivoi Rog area, with its IV and XXIX Army Corps clinging on to the Nikopol bridgehead over the Dnieper, the easternmost protrusion of a salient centred on the key rail junction of Apostolovo. On 3 November, these two corps were temporarily transferred to the 1st Panzer Army, and within weeks they became part of Group Schörner under the command of General der Gebirgstruppe Ferdinand Schörner along with the XVII Army Corps to the north. During November and December, the 3rd and 4th Ukrainian Fronts launched a series of unsuccessful assaults against the Nikopol bridgehead and the Krivoi Rog area, which formed a salient. The 3rd Ukrainian Front directed its assaults against the northern part of the salient, while the 4th Ukrainian Front moved against the southern part.

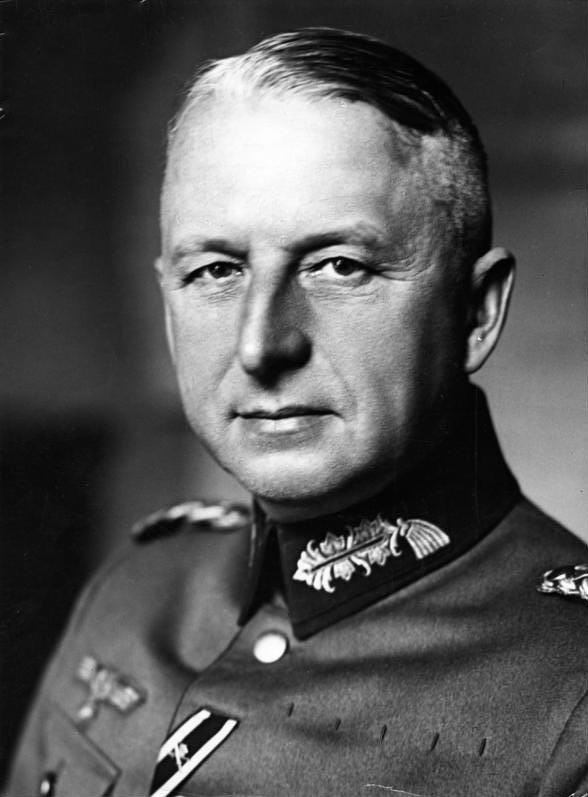
Army Group South commander Erich von Manstein, 1938

Since its capture by the Germans in 1941, the rich deposits of manganese in the area of Nikopol had been used in Germany for the production of high-strength steel. Adolf Hitler repeatedly stressed the crucial importance of this area, telling his commanders that the "Loss of Nikopol would mean the end of the war." The Nikopol bridgehead also held operational significance because it could serve as a springboard for an assault to relieve German troops trapped in Crimea, and Hitler refused demands by Army Group South commander Generalfeldmarschall Erich von Manstein for its evacuation. As a result, the bridgehead was heavily fortified, with three lines of trenches in its first defensive line, strengthened by barbed wire belts and minefields. All heights and settlements immediately behind the front were turned into fortified strongpoints. These positions were what remained of the fortified German Dnieper line.

Despite Hitler's obsession with the bridgehead, the mining of manganese ore ceased during the winter of 1943 and 1944 and the previously mined stocks "could not be moved" due to a lack of transport, according to 6th Army chief of staff Generalleutnant Max Bork. On 1 January, 6th Army was transferred from Army Group A, which held the southernmost part of Ukraine west of the Dnieper, to Army Group South, whose sector ran from north of Krivoi Rog to the Pripet marshes in the northernmost portion of Ukraine. Around this time, Manstein transferred the 1st Panzer Army to the northern sector, leaving a few of its infantry divisions behind in the Nikopol bridgehead; these joined the 6th Army. On 4 January 1944, Manstein flew to Führer Headquarters expressly to persuade Hitler to allow a withdrawal from Nikopol and Crimea in order to shorten the front, but his request was denied.

There were also formidable natural barriers in the area – the Kamenka River in the 3rd Ukrainian Front's sector, and the Dnieper in the 4th Ukrainian Front's sector. Behind the German front line in the Nikopol bridgehead was the marshy floodplain of the Dnieper, which rarely froze in the winter. The only exits from the bridgehead were a temporary bridge in the northern sector east of Nikopol and a pair of one-lane pontoon bridges at the far southern end of the bridgehead at Velikaya (Bolshaya) Lepetikha. The remainder of the 6th Army sector, facing north and slightly east, stretched between positions 18 miles (29 km) north of Krivoi Rog and 30 miles (48 km) north of Apostolovo, where the sole rail line supplying the army branched north and towards Nikopol. The positions ran across open steppe divided at right angles by numerous ravines and the watercourses of five major rivers.

A single hard-surfaced road passed through the army's sector, designated Through Road IV, but it was unusable due to its proximity to the frontline, except for a small area at Krivoi Rog. Due to a total lack of suitable road building materials, the German forces were unable to construct hard-surfaced roads. As a result, when the roads turned to mud (rasputitsa) in the wet winter weather, the railway and tracked vehicles were the sole reliable transportation method, which meant that if Soviet troops could capture Apostolovo they would have effectively cut off the German forces in the bridgehead.

== Prelude ==
=== Preliminary attacks ===
At the end of 1943, the 3rd Ukrainian Front, commanded by General armii (Note: Equivalent to a U.S. Army general.) Rodion Malinovsky, was entrenched on the line of Veselyye Terny, Tomakovka, and Belenkoye. It included the 8th Guards, 6th, and 46th Armies, the 17th Air Army, and the 23rd Tank Corps. The front included only nineteen rifle divisions and a tank corps, and faced the German LVII Panzer, XXX, and XVII Army Corps. General armii Fyodor Tolbukhin's 4th Ukrainian Front included the 3rd Guards, 5th Shock, and 28th Armies, the 8th Air Army, the 2nd and 4th Guards Mechanized Corps, and the 4th Guards Cavalry Corps, operating against the Nikopol bridgehead. These elements of the front fielded 22 rifle divisions, three cavalry divisions, and two mechanized corps. They faced the IV and XXIX Army Corps in the Nikopol bridgehead.

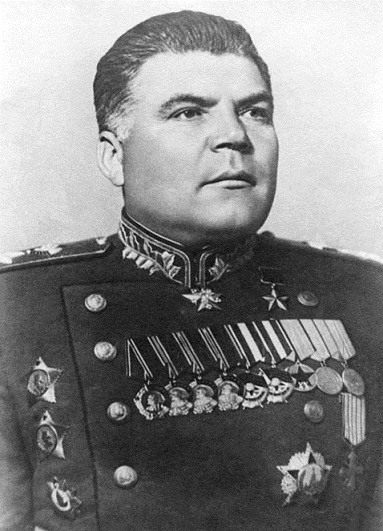
3rd Ukrainian Front commander General armii Rodion Malinovsky in the late 1940s

The 3rd Ukrainian Front and elements of the 4th Ukrainian Front were tasked in January with destroying the German forces in the area of Nikopol and Krivoi Rog, eliminating the Nikopol bridgehead, and pushing the German troops back behind the line of the Inhulets and the Southern Bug. On 29 December 1943, Marshal Sovetskogo Soyuza (Note: Equivalent to a U.S. Army general of the army.) Aleksandr Vasilevsky, the representative of the Soviet high command, Stavka, reported that the defeat of the German troops opposing the 1st Ukrainian Front in the Zhitomir–Berdichev offensive and the redirection of the 2nd Ukrainian Front towards an attack on Kirovograd forced a reconsideration of the operational plans for the 3rd and 4th Ukrainian Fronts. He concluded that a German withdrawal from the Nikopol bridgehead was likely and thus advocated a renewed attack to begin between 10 and 12 January 1944.

Stavka approved his plan, and after preparations between 10 and 12 January, the 3rd and 4th Ukrainian Fronts began the attack. The former's 8th Guards and 46th Armies advanced towards Apostolovo against XXX Army Corps on 10 January, and the latter's 3rd Guards, 5th Shock, and 28th Armies attacked the IV and XXIX Army Corps in the Nikopol bridgehead on 12 January. The attack of the 3rd Ukrainian Front on 10 January, spearheaded by what a German report estimated as 80 tanks, and preceded by an artillery barrage, included nine rifle divisions from both armies, advancing in two waves. It was stopped after gaining 3 miles (4.8 km) by two German panzer divisions, which claimed to have destroyed two-thirds of the Soviet tanks after the latter outran their supporting infantry.

Continued German counterattacks reduced the breach to about a mile by the end of the day. In four to five days of stubborn fighting, the Soviet troops were unable to make decisive gains. The 3rd Ukrainian Front wedged into the German line between 6 and 8 kilometers (3.7 and 5.0 mi) through preponderance in infantry, but could not break through due to German resistance, shortages of ammunition and its lack of tanks, which prevented the creation of a strong attack group. Hollidt briefly considered withdrawing the 24th Panzer Division from the Nikopol bridgehead to lead a counterattack against the Soviet gains in the north, but decided against it after the 4th Ukrainian Front began its attack against the bridgehead. The 4th Ukrainian Front suffered a similar lack of success and the attacks were halted by 17 January to allow the troops to consolidate their positions and to plan a more thorough offensive.

Between 11 and 20 January, in the period which included these attacks, the 3rd Guards, 5th Shock, and 28th Armies of the 4th Ukrainian Front suffered total casualties of 3,191 killed and 9,938 wounded, with the 3rd Guards and 28th Armies bearing the brunt of the casualties. In the ten-day period between 11 and 20 January that included the Soviet attack, the German 6th Army reported casualties of 1,339 killed, 4,865 wounded, and 446 missing. Casualties of 834 killed, 3,214 wounded, and 419 missing were reported in the next ten-day period between 21 and 31 January.

=== Soviet planning and preparations ===
On the day that the attacks concluded, Vasilevsky submitted a new plan to Stavka for an attack to begin on 30 January. The 3rd Ukrainian Front was given the main role in the operation, and was reinforced with the 37th Army from the 2nd Ukrainian Front with six rifle divisions, the 4th Guards Mechanized Corps from the 4th Ukrainian Front, and the 31st Guards Rifle Corps from Stavka Reserve with three rifle divisions. The front received 64 tanks, and was replenished with significant quantities of ammunition and fuel. The 4th Ukrainian Front also received more ammunition.

Vasilevsky's plan stipulated that General-leytenant (Note: Equivalent to a U.S. Army major general.) Mikhail Sharokhin's 37th Army and General-leytenant Ivan Shlemin's Soviet 6th Army were to launch diversionary attacks towards the German LVII Panzer Corps at Krivoi Rog and the XVII Army Corps of General der Gebirgstruppe Hans Kreysing at Nikopol, respectively. The main blow of the 3rd Ukrainian Front was planned to be delivered against the XXX Army Corps of General der Artillerie Maximilian Fretter-Pico by General-leytenant Vasily Glagolev's 46th Army, General-polkovnik (Note: Equivalent to a U.S. Army lieutenant general.) Vasily Chuikov's 8th Guards Army, and General-leytenant Trofim Tanaschishin's 4th Guards Mechanized Corps towards Apostolovo and the Dnieper in order to link up with the 4th Ukrainian Front. The 8th Guards and 46th Armies were to attack on a 21-kilometer (13 mi), with a density of 140 guns and mortars and nine tanks and self-propelled guns per kilometer. General-leytenant Vladimir Sudets' 17th Air Army provided air support for the 3rd Ukrainian Front.

Meanwhile, General-leytenant Dmitry Lelyushenko's 3rd Guards, General-leytenant Vyacheslav Tsvetayev's 5th Shock, and General-leytenant Alexey Grechkin's 28th Armies of the 4th Ukrainian Front, supported by General-leytenant Timofey Khryukin's 8th Air Army, were to destroy the German troops in the Nikopol bridgehead – the IV and XXIX Army Corps of Group Schörner, commanded by General der Infanterie Friedrich Mieth and General der Panzertruppe Erich Brandenberger, respectively. General-leytenant Karp Sviridov's 2nd Guards Mechanized Corps was to be inserted into the breakthrough in the 5th Shock Army's sector.

Over three nights between 16 and 18 January, the 8th Guards Army was concentrated by reducing its sector west of the Dnieper, and divisions from the Soviet 6th Army crossed the Dnieper to take over the former's previous positions. The 46th Army was concentrated on the flank of the 8th Guards Army, and the 37th Army moved forward on the 46th Army's right. The 4th Guards Mechanized Corps was shifted forward from south of the Dnieper to take positions reinforcing the intersection of the 8th Guards Army and the 46th Army. The concentration of the 3rd and 8th Guards and 37th Armies was picked up by German intelligence; however, the full extent of 8th Guards Army's concentration went undetected and the movement of the 4th Guards Mechanized Corps was missed entirely.

=== German redeployments ===
Anticipating an attack on the northern part of the salient, Hollidt withdrew his three panzer divisions from the front to become an armored reserve for the former on 24 January. Within days, however, he had to transfer an infantry division to Crimea and two infantry division equivalents to the 8th Army. This was capped by the sending of the 24th Panzer Division, the army's best equipped panzer division, on a 310-kilometer (190 mi) march to reinforce the right flank of the 1st Panzer Army on 28 January during the Battle of the Korsun–Cherkassy Pocket, significantly reducing the armored forces available to the German 6th Army. The latter was left with only the 9th Panzer Division for a reserve, which fielded only thirteen tanks – a third of its authorized strength – and had a much-reduced number of infantry and artillery.

== Comparison of forces ==
=== German ===
Following the transfers in late January, the German 6th Army fielded twenty divisions (including three panzer) with an average combat strength of 2,500 and eight assault gun battalions, as well as a large number of artillery and pioneer units. Of these, eight infantry divisions (four each in IV and XXIX Army Corps) and three assault gun battalions formed part of Group Schörner in the Nikopol bridgehead. The German infantry units had been reinforced by scraping the rear units for manpower, which enabled the 17th, 111th, and 258th Infantry Divisions and the 3rd Mountain Division to field 7,855 combat infantrymen by 16 January. Though the remainder of these were combat-experienced veterans, 5,500 were transferred from the rear units.

The German 6th Army was nominally supported by the 1st Air Corps of Luftflotte 4. At the beginning of the Nikopol–Krivoy Rog Offensive on 30 January, the army fielded 260,000 men, 6,420 guns and mortars, 480 tanks and assault guns, and 560 aircraft. However, a quarter of the tanks, assault guns, and artillery pieces were unserviceable. In addition, a shortage of anti-aircraft ammunition prevented the German ground forces from defending against Soviet air superiority, which Schörner described as "absolute" in a report to the 6th Army command. Soviet air attacks attacked supply lines and prevented the effective employment of German artillery by destroying communications, in addition to hindering the movement of reserve forces by disrupting command and control.

Order of battle: German 6th Army (Generaloberst Karl-Adolf Hollidt) on 1 February
Corps	Corps Commander	Divisions
LVII Panzer Corps		257th, 62nd, 15th, and 46th Infantry
XXX Army Corps	General der Artillerie Maximilian Fretter-Pico	16th Panzergrenadier, 123rd and 306th Infantry
XVII Army Corps	General der Gebrigstruppe Hans Kreysing	387th, 125th, and 294th Infantry
IV Army Corps	General der Infanterie Friedrich Mieth	3rd Mountain, 302nd, 17th, and 111th Infantry
XXIX Army Corps	General der Panzertruppe Erich Brandenberger	9th, 258th, 97th, and 335th Infantry
Army Reserve		9th, 23rd and 24th (in transit) Panzer

=== Soviet ===
The Soviet troops totaled 705,000 men, 8,048 guns and mortars, 390 tanks, and 1,200 combat aircraft, as well as 140 Polikarpov U-2 and Polikarpov R-5 reconnaissance aircraft. The 3rd Ukrainian Front fielded thirty infantry divisions, including one airborne fighting as infantry, in addition to a mechanized corps. It was supported by one breakthrough artillery division and four anti-aircraft artillery divisions, among others. The elements of the 4th Ukrainian Front that fought in the operation fielded seventeen additional infantry divisions and a mechanized corps, supported by two breakthrough artillery divisions and an anti-aircraft artillery division. They numbered 115,537 men and 2,925 guns on 1 February, not including the 2nd Guards Mechanized Corps and the front reserve artillery.

Order of battle: 3rd Ukrainian Front (General armii Rodion Malinovsky) on 1 February
Army	Army Commander	Corps	Divisions
6th	General-leytenant Ivan Shlemin	66th Rifle	203rd and 333rd Rifle
		None	60th Guards and 244th Rifle
8th Guards	General-polkovnik Vasily Chuikov	4th Guards Rifle	35th, 47th, and 57th Guards Rifle
		28th Guards Rifle	39th, 79th, and 88th Guards Rifle
		29th Guards Rifle	27th, 74th, and 82nd Guards Rifle
		None	11th Tank Brigade
37th	General-leytenant Mikhail Sharokhin	57th Rifle	48th and 58th Guards, and 228th Rifle
		82nd Rifle	15th and 28th Guards, and 188th Rifle
		None	92nd Guards Rifle, 10th Guards Airborne, and 35th Anti-Aircraft Artillery
46th	General-leytenant Vasily Glagolev	6th Guards Rifle	20th Guards, 236th, and 353rd Rifle
		31st Guards Rifle	4th, 34th, and 40th Guards Rifle
		34th Rifle	195th and 394th Rifle
		None	152nd Rifle
17th Air	General-leytenant Vladimir Sudets	1st Mixed Aviation	5th Guards Assault and 288th Fighter Aviation
		9th Mixed Aviation	305th and 306th Assault, and 295th Fighter Aviation
		None	244th Bomber and 262nd Night Bomber Aviation
Front units			9th Breakthrough Artillery, 3rd, 4th, and 22nd Anti-Aircraft Artillery
		4th Guards Mechanized	13th, 14th, and 15th Guards Mechanized, and 36th Guards Tank Brigades

Order of battle: 4th Ukrainian Front (General armii Fyodor Tolbukhin) on 1 February
Army	Army Commander	Corps	Divisions
3rd Guards	General-leytenant Dmitry Lelyushenko	34th Guards Rifle	59th and 61st Guards, and 243rd Rifle
		32nd Rifle	259th and 266th Rifle
		None	7th Breakthrough Artillery and 2nd Anti-Aircraft Artillery Divisions, 32nd Guards Tank and 5th Guards Motor Rifle Brigades
5th Shock	General-leytenant Vyacheslav Tsvetayev	3rd Guards Rifle	50th, 54th, and 96th Guards Rifle
		37th Rifle	248th and 416th Rifle
		None	118th and 130th Rifle, 26th Artillery Divisions
28th	General-leytenant Alexey Grechkin	10th Guards Rifle	109th Guards, 61st and 320th Rifle
		9th Rifle	230th and 301st Rifle
		None	2nd Guards Breakthrough Artillery
8th Air	General-leytenant Timofey Khryukhin	7th Assault Aviation	206th and 289th Assault, 236th Fighter Aviation
		3rd Fighter Aviation	265th and 278th Fighter Aviation
		None	6th Guards Bomber, 1st Guards Assault, 6th Guards Fighter, and 2nd Guards Night Bomber Aviation
Front units		2nd Guards Mechanized	4th, 5th, and 6th Guards Mechanized, and 37th Guards Tank Brigades

== Offensive ==
=== 3rd Ukrainian Front operations ===
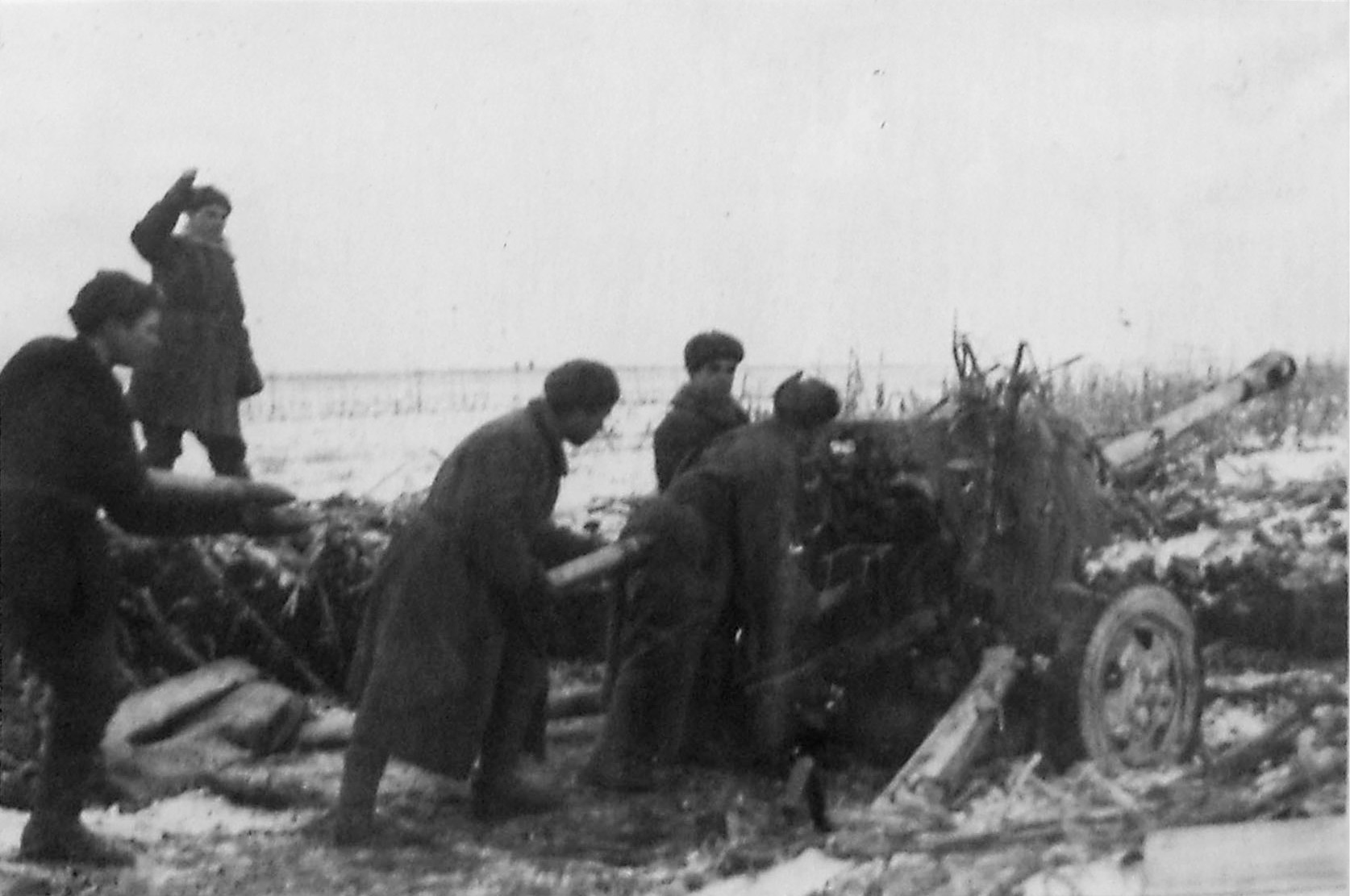
Soviet artillerymen firing at German positions

The diversionary attacks of the Soviet 6th and 37th Armies began on the morning of 30 January. The latter's 82nd Rifle Corps with the 15th and 28th Guards and 188th Rifle Divisions achieved the most success, breaking through the German line, in an 8-kilometer sector and advancing 3–4 kilometers (1.9–2.5 mi) from Veselyye Terny against the 62nd Infantry Division of LVII Panzer Corps. Stubborn resistance and counterattacks slowed the Soviet advance, which devolved into what American historian Earl F. Ziemke described as a "series of uncoordinated skirmishes." The Soviet 6th Army attacked with its 60th Guards and 244th Rifle Divisions, managing to carve a small foothold in the defenses of XVII Army Corps northeast of Nikopol.

Chuikov began the main attack on 31 January by having his troops conduct reconnaissance with one battalion from each first-echelon rifle division in order to retain surprise, instead of conducting reconnaissance with one to two battalions from each corps between one and three days preceding the operation, a tactic that later became known as the special echelon. At dawn, a 50-minute Soviet artillery and air bombardment commenced, and the infantry and tanks of the 8th Guards and 46th Armies jumped off at 09:15. Fierce fighting ensued as the Soviet troops broke through the defenses of the 46th and 123rd Infantry Divisions and the 16th Panzergrenadier Division, inflicting heavy losses and forcing them to retreat, leaving behind artillery, vehicles, and ammunition. The Soviet advance carried into the positions of the 9th Panzer Division.

Closely cooperating with infantry and artillery, the 4th Guards Mechanized Corps with 120 tanks and assault guns was inserted into the Soviet breakthrough in the sector of the 8th Guards Army at 16:00 on 1 February. In its advance, the 4th Guards scattered retreating units of the 123rd Infantry Division of the XXX Army Corps and captured 85 soldiers, before reaching the northern outskirts of Kamenka and Sholokhovo by the end of the day and running into the 23rd Panzer Division, which fielded around 60 tanks. The Soviet attack towards Sholokhovo threatened to cut off the supply route for the German troops in the Nikopol bridgehead. In the first days of the offensive, despite bad weather, Soviet aviation was active over the front. As a result of the Soviet attacks, on 2 February, the German 6th Army was transferred back to Army Group A, commanded by Generalfeldmarschall Ewald von Kleist. Schörner ordered his forces to evacuate the Nikopol bridgehead on the same day and retreat to a line beginning at the mouth of the Basavluk, 20 kilometers (12 mi) west of Nikopol, and ending at Dolinzevo, 10 kilometers (6.2 mi) east of Krivoi Rog, known as the Ursula position. Sholokhovo fell that morning, although the Soviet advance was temporarily halted to the south by the replacement battalions of the 258th and 302nd Divisions.

In order to hold open the retreat route for units east of the Dnieper and secure the railway bridge over the Basavluk near Perevizskiye, the 3rd Mountain Division used its replacement and pioneer battalions in conjunction with 258th Division alarm units to counterattack elements of the 8th Guards Army and 4th Guards Mechanized Corps, but lost nearly half of their strength in the fighting. The tank-destroyer battalion of the 3rd Mountain managed to disable several Soviet armored vehicles near Perevizskiye, but the right flank of its pioneer battalion was turned on 6 February by a tank attack into the settlement. A counterattack supported by assault guns and a regiment of the 3rd Mountain retook the northern part of the settlement, enabling the establishment of a coherent German line east of the Basavluk. With the Soviet advance there briefly halted, 6th Army command planned to recapture Sholokovo and hold a line east of Kamenka, but this was abandoned after Schörner reported that such an action would lead to the loss of most of the vehicles.

Continuing the attack in the spring rasputitsa, which made roads impassable, the 46th Army's 4th and 34th Guards Rifle Divisions reached the key rail junction of Apostolovo, the German 6th Army's main supply base, on the evening of 4 February. There, the remnants of the 123rd Infantry Division of XXX Corps and elements of the 9th Panzer Division were concentrated in an all-around defense with up to 3,000 men, 80 guns, and 30 tanks and assault guns. The 4th Guards attacked from the north and east, and the 34th Guards from the west and northwest. With the assistance of locals, the scouts from the 34th Guards Division found a gap in German defenses 4 kilometers northwest of the city, and its 105th Guards Rifle Regiment penetrated the German position and captured the railway station early on the morning of 5 February. Around this time the rest of the two divisions launched the attack, and Apostolovo was captured by 8:00 that morning. The loss of Apostolovo split the German 6th Army in half, one part in the area of Krivoi Rog and the other in the area of Nikopol and Marganets, as LVII Panzer Corps around Krivoi Rog had thus lost contact with XXX Army Corps following the retreat of 9th Panzer Division from Apostolovo. In addition, attacks by Soviet assault aviation disrupted the movement of the 3rd Mountain Division at the Tok railroad station on the single rail line by destroying locomotives, preventing the evacuation of German wounded.

Meanwhile, the 8th Guards Army and 4th Guards Mechanized Corps captured Kamenka and Perevizskiye, threatening the encirclement of the five divisions of the XVII Army Corps in the area of Marganets and Nikopol. In six days, the 3rd Ukrainian Front had broken through the German defenses and advanced between 45 and 60 kilometers (28 and 37 mi), inflicting heavy losses on the 6th Army. From Apostolovo, the 46th Army continued to advance west towards the Inhulets, while the 8th Guards Army and 4th Guards Mechanized Corps attempted to reach the Dnieper to cut off the German troops around Nikopol, capturing Bolshaya Kostromka, Novosemyonovka, and Verkhnemikhailovka.

=== 4th Ukrainian Front operations ===
The 4th Ukrainian Front began its attack on the Nikopol bridgehead on 31 January, with the 5th Shock Army's 50th Guards Rifle Division pushing the German troops back 1.5 kilometers (0.93 mi) in an attack beginning at 04:00. At 08:00 the 54th Guards Rifle Division began its attack. At noon the 3rd Guards and 28th Armies began supporting attacks to assist the 5th Shock Army. The 2nd Guards Mechanized Corps with around 30 tanks and self-propelled guns entered the breakthrough in 5th Shock's sector at 15:00 and advanced up to 11 kilometers (6.8 mi) by the end of the day against dogged German resistance, outpacing 5th Shock, which advanced up to 7 kilometers (4.3 mi). On 2 February the German troops began to withdraw, in accordance with Schörner's order, to the Dnieper crossings at Velikaya Lepetikha and Nikopol, which were under constant Soviet air attacks and shelling. These disrupted the German withdrawal, but despite heavy losses, Group Schörner was able to withdraw across the river, beginning with the 3rd Mountain Division at Nikopol.

German resistance stymied the Soviet advance: on 2 February the 3rd Guards, 5th Shock, and 28th Armies continued to attack, but only the 5th Shock was able to make small gains, though on 3 February the 4th Ukrainian Front advance reached a depth of 8 kilometers. The three Soviet armies continued their attacks along the previous routes on 4 February, but were again unsuccessful. Taking advantage of the German retreat from their main line of resistance in the Nikopol bridgehead on 5 February, the 3rd Guards, 5th Shock, and 28th Armies began the pursuit that day against German rearguard detachments, advancing between 4 and 14 kilometers. The last German unit to evacuate the northern portion of the bridgehead from IV Army Corps was the 302nd Infantry Division, whose pioneers blew up the bridge over the Dnieper at Nikopol at midnight on 6 February. The German pioneers also destroyed abandoned guns and vehicles as well as infrastructure in Nikopol. Velikaya Lepetikha was captured on the morning of 8 February by the 5th Shock and 28th Armies, completing the elimination of the Nikopol bridgehead, after XXIX Army Corps evacuated the small bridgehead remaining there in spite of Hitler's orders to hold it at all costs.

On the night of 7 to 8 February, the Soviet 6th Army of the 3rd Ukrainian Front entered Nikopol from the north and east. Its 203rd, 244th, and 333rd Rifle Divisions fought their way into the city, while the 4th Ukrainian Front's 3rd Guards Army attacked from the south after crossing the Dnieper. Its 266th Rifle Division and 5th Guards Motor Rifle Brigade were among the first into the city. The city was cleared of German troops by 8 February, after a night of heavy street fighting with elements of the retreating 302nd Division.

Between 1 and 10 February, the 4th Ukrainian Front's 3rd Guards, 5th Shock, and 28th Armies suffered casualties of 1,725 killed, 4,960 wounded, and 94 missing. The majority of the casualties were inflicted on the 5th Shock Army. German equipment losses in the evacuation of the bridgehead were heavy, with several divisions having lost their entire complement of heavy weapons.

=== German counterattack ===
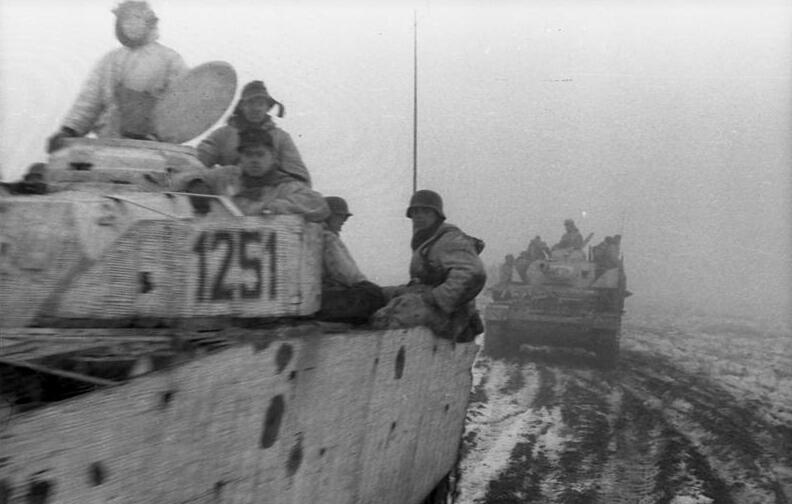
German Panzer IVs of 24th Panzer-division tanks on the move

In the following days, fierce fighting took place over a narrow corridor held by German troops west of Nikopol, centered on a westward-facing defensive line composed of forces withdrawn from the bridgehead around Marinskoye and Perevizskiye, including elements of the 302nd Division and the remnants of the 9th Panzer Division and the units that had managed to make it out of the bridgehead from IV, XVII, and XXIX Army Corps. In order to secure the corridor, the retreat route for troops east of the Kamenka, the Oberkommando der Wehrmacht, the German supreme command, projected an attack to attack the Soviet units in the flank by retaking Sholokhovo followed by an advance towards Kamenka, as well as recapturing Bolshaya Kostromka. The weakness of the 302nd Division rendered this broad offensive unfeasible, resulting in the additional commitment of the 17th, 9th, and 258th Infantry Divisions as well as the 97th Jäger Division of IV and XXIX Corps to a counterattack west against Bolshaya Kostromka, as well as a counterattack towards Apostolovo to restore communications to the west by reopening the Tok–Novosemyonovka railway line.

The counterattack met with initial success, recapturing Nikolayevka and Novosemyonovka. Beginning on 8 February, the 302nd Infantry Division with a regiment each from the 17th and 302nd Divisions, supported by the 9th Infantry Division began its attack on Bolshaya Kostromka. The settlement was recaptured except for its eastern edge in fierce fighting, during which the German forces suffered heavy casualties. A 9 February 8 Guards Army tank-supported counterattack against Tok was stopped after nearly destroying elements of the 3rd Mountain Division. To fully secure the retreat route, the 125th Infantry Division of XVII Corps was tasked with taking the eastern edge of Bolshaya Kostromka, launching its attack on 10 February with the support of the 302nd Division. The attack fully cleared the settlement and the 125th continued the advance towards Novosemyonovka and Apostolovo.

The strong German counterattack towards Apostolovo by units of IV Army Corps, among others, struck the junction of the 8th Guards and 46th Armies on 11 February. The few Soviet units in the area were forced to withdraw, and by the end of the day the German troops had gained 8 to 10 kilometers, threatening the recapture of Apostolovo. Malinovsky hastily rushed the 48th Guards Rifle Division and two anti-tank artillery regiments forward from the front reserve, and the 82nd Guards and 152nd Rifle Divisions were concentrated to defend the city. The German counterattack ran out of steam due to Soviet air attacks on 12 February when the 125th was forced to retreat to its original positions; its losses in the fighting were so severe that it had to be disbanded in the following days. However, the 8th Guards Army was significantly weakened due to muddy road conditions causing its artillery and tanks to lag behind, as well as ammunition shortages. On 10 February the 4th Guards Mechanized Corps was withdrawn to the reserve in the Apostolovo area due to losses.

=== Pursuit to Krivoi Rog ===
During the next several days, the German troops held the Dnieper marshes and the Nikopol–Dudchino road, allowing elements of five infantry divisions, including several from XVII Corps, to retreat, although losing almost all their heavy equipment. Simultaneously, the 37th Army continued to fight south of Veselyye Terny, the 46th Army advanced northwest of Apostolovo, the 8th Guards Army advanced to the southwest of that city, and the Soviet 6th Army entered the Novovorontsovka area. On 10 February, the 3rd Guards Army transferred to the 3rd Ukrainian Front, but was soon withdrawn to Stavka Reserve. The 5th Shock Army, also transferred to the 3rd Ukrainian, crossed the Dnieper in conditions worsened by floating ice on 10 February and captured a bridgehead northwest of Malaya Lepetikha. For the next several days, the advance paused as ammunition and artillery were brought up, awaiting the resumption of the attack on Krivoi Rog.

During this lull in the fighting, the German 6th Army reorganized its forces due to the heavy losses suffered. In addition to the disbandment of the 125th, two regiments of the 302nd were combined into one, while the 387th Infantry Division was merged into the 258th. Alarm units were scraped together from artillerymen who had lost their guns, rear personnel, and stragglers. In addition, the previous fighting had caused a lack of pioneers, bridging equipment, vehicles, guns, infantry ammunition, and tanks. The 17th and 294th Divisions had also suffered heavy losses in the attempt to clear the retreat route, though troops of IV and XVII Army Corps held their positions at Marinskoye. The 97th Jäger and 24th Panzer Divisions, the latter returned from its abortive march to the Korsun Pocket, attacked to the west of Bolshaya Kostromka on 15 February to link up with LVII Panzer Corps. Erasing a Soviet penetration, they reported the capture of 221 guns, 66 anti-tank guns, and 62 machine guns. This allowed for a relatively unharrassed 6th Army retreat towards the Inhulets.

The attack on Krivoi Rog was conducted by the 37th and 46th Armies against five German infantry divisions and two Panzer divisions from LVII Panzer Corps. The former was to attack in a 10-kilometer (6.2 mi) sector northeast of the city and bypass the city from the north, while the latter was tasked with breaking through the center of the German line in a 16-kilometer (9.9 mi) sector and frontally assaulting the city from the southeast. In the breakthrough sectors of the armies, 40 to 50 guns and mortars were concentrated per kilometer.

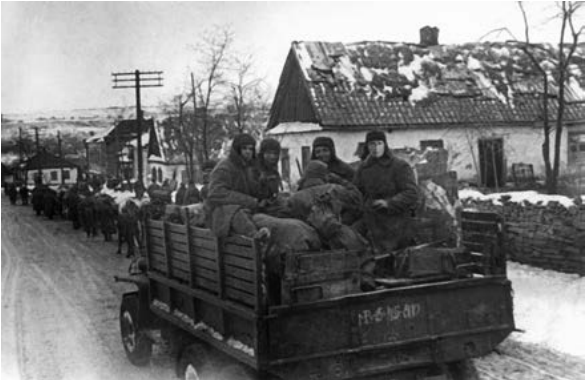
Soviet troops entering Krivoy Rog in February 1944

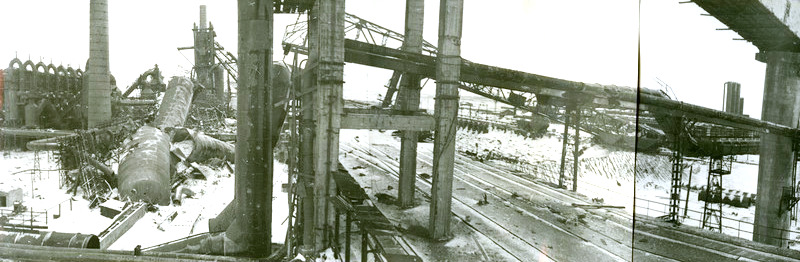
A blast furnace at Krivorozstal, destroyed by retreating German forces

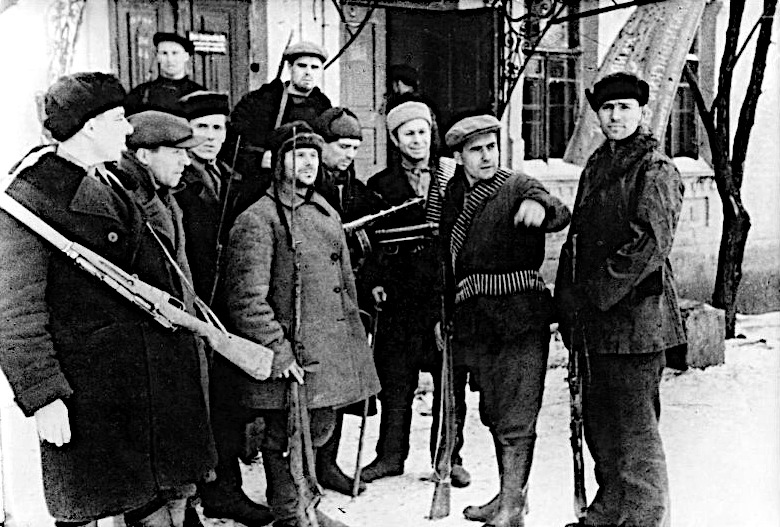
A detachment of partisans formed from miners returns to Krivoy Rog

The attack began on 17 February: 37th Army jumped off at 05:00 and 46th Army at 10:00 following a 30-minute artillery preparation. Blizzard conditions made the advance difficult and grounded Soviet aviation, but in the first two days the two armies advanced between 5 and 12 kilometers (3.1 and 7.5 mi) in heavy fighting in mud and snow. Against German counterattacks, the 37th Army's 82nd Rifle Corps reached the city outskirts from the northeast on 21 February. At the same time, the 46th Army's 6th Guards Rifle Corps and 34th Rifle Corps reached the eastern and southeastern outskirts of the city. The bulk of the German defenses were concentrated in the east, where it was anticipated that the main blow would come. Exploiting weak points discovered by Soviet reconnaissance, the 37th and 46th Armies moved into the city at dawn on 22 February from the northwest and southeast, respectively; it was cleared by 16:00 that day. In celebration of the capture of Krivoi Rog, a 224-gun artillery salute was fired in Moscow. A special 37th Army detachment prevented the German demolition of the power stations in the city and the Saksahan dams.

=== Advance to the Inhulets ===
After the capture of Krivoi Rog, the 37th Army advanced to the Inhulets west of the city, and the 46th Army to the Inhulets south of the city. On 25 February the 8th Guards and 6th Armies resumed the advance to the Inhulets. The 5th Shock Army resumed the attack southwest from a bridgehead on the Dnieper on 26 February and reached the line of Velikaya Aleksandrovka and Dudchino three days later. The Inhulets became the main German defensive line as a convenient natural barrier, although the 8th Guards Army's 35th and 57th Guards Rifle Divisions captured a bridgehead in the Shyroke area. Almost simultaneously, the 37th Army captured a bridgehead west of Krivoi Rog, and the 46th Army a bridgehead north of Shyroke.

== Aftermath ==
Soviet documents in the Central Archives of the Russian Ministry of Defense estimated that they had captured 4,600 German military personnel during the offensive. For the month of February, in its casualty reports submitted to higher headquarters every ten days, the German 6th Army reported casualties of 2,905 killed, 10,018 wounded, and 2,445 missing, for a total of 15,368. According to its reports in the German Federal Military Archive, the army lost 13,240 men, including 8,390 wounded and 4,850 killed or missing, between 11 and 29 February.

The 6th Army High Command report, completed on 13 March 1944, provides near-complete figures for the army losses in February 1944. According to it, casualties of the 6th Army divisions, together with the subordinated corps (Korpstruppen), army (Armeetruppen) and army group (Heerestruppen) general headquarters (GHQ) combat units, amounted to 3,302 killed, 11,707 wounded, 4,281 missing, and 5,588 sick for a total of 24,878 casualties. The total 6th Army losses, however, were somewhat higher than this number. The document explicitly states that losses of the 62nd and 123rd Infantry Divisions, 97th Jäger Division, 16th Panzergrenadier Division and 3rd Mountain Division are given only for the first half of February (1-15), the precise losses in the second half of the month were not possible to establish for these divisions. In addition, the losses of the paramilitary 'Wehrmacht entourage' (Wehrmacht Gefolge), which were attached to the 6th Army and supported it (members of O.T., RAD, Reichsbahn etc.) are not included. As the Red Army penetrated deep into the rear areas of the 6th Army during this offensive, where these organizations were located at, they sustained some losses as well, but there are no documents that give a breakdown of their losses. Finally, the losses of the flak units, which were operating in the rear area of the 6th Army but were under subordination of the Luftflotte 4, are not counted either- the biggest unit among these was the 15th Flak Division. Thus, based on the aforementioned factors, the total losses of the 6th Army, plus Luftwaffe anti-aircraft units and paramilitary organizations attached to it, were close to 30,000. Another indication of this are the losses of Army Group A for February 1944. At the time, this army group consisted of the 6th Army in southern Ukraine and the 17th Army cut off in Crimea. The losses of the army group for February amounted to 40,500 killed, wounded, missing and sick in total. Since the 17th Army had a quiet month in Crimea and saw little fighting, the vast majority of these losses can be attributed to the 6th Army.

The material losses of all sorts of the 6th Army were very high, especially in terms of motor vehicles. According to the army's Oberquartiermeister report, in February 1944, as a result of difficult retreats and breakouts in muddy conditions, the army lost a total of 8,200 trucks of all capacities and models, 2,900 passenger cars (ordinary and cross-country), 2,400 motorcycles (both solo and with sidecar), 650 artillery prime movers of all capacities (including the RSO prime mover) and 1,100 motor vehicle trailers (both single-axe and double-axe). There's no similar report prepared about losses in artillery pieces, armoured vehicles and other weapons, but its clear that 6th Army divisions had significant shortfalls in all types of weapons by the start of March 1944, based on the reports of army commander and weekly divisional condition reports at the end of February- start of March 1944.

Summarizing the three-week heavy defensive fighting and how badly it damaged the 6th Army, the army commander, Generaloberst Karl-Adolf Hollidt, reported on 20 February 1944:

Due to the mental and physical overstraining of the troops in the heavy defensive battles of the last few weeks and the high personnel and material losses, most of the divisions of the army are now physically, numerically and materially worn-out. Only through the personal commitment of all officers and draconian performance demands could the defense against the stubbornly fighting, constantly strengthening enemy be ensured. Nevertheless, individual divisions had to be dragged along to local attacks, often with bare weapons in the dark.
The resulting demands given the fighting situation have been reported to higher authorities. I will only emphasize the most important points:
1.) The large shortage of officers is having a significant impact on combat effectiveness. Due to the increasing shortage of experienced officers and non-commissioned officers, the internal structure of the troops in the worn-out divisions will no longer be able to cope with greater stress at present. In order to increase the fighting and resistance power, a large number of fresh, energetic and capable officers must be brought in.
It is urgently necessary to supply non-commissioned officers from unattacked fronts (Norway, Lapland, France, Balkans), whose personnel and combat situation allow for the training of non-commissioned officers to a particularly high degree, to the worn-out units of the Eastern Front.
2.) The state of personnel and materiel made it necessary to merge the two weakened divisional battle groups into divisional groups and integrate them into weak divisions to replenish them. Exhausting all means at its disposal, the army formed numerous alarm units [Alarm-Einheiten] from artillerymen, personnel of supply trains, rear services and scattered troops, whose reliability is, as experience has shown, very limited, and integrated them into the weakened units. All human reserves are now exhausted.
The replacements in no way cover the losses that have occurred. Due to the particularly high shortage of engineers in all divisions, this important weapon is so weakened that it can no longer fulfill its most necessary tasks. The bulk of the bridge equipment is lost in the mud. Increased and rapid supply of replacements on an exceptional scale to speed up the refitting of the weakened units, if possible by air transport, is a particular requirement, with engineer replacements also a priority.
3.) The bulk of the army's divisions lost a large part of their weapons and equipment in the last battles, in particular due to the impassable terrain caused by the early onset of the muddy period [Schlammperiode].
The number of vehicles lost is unusually high. Some divisions do not have a single anti-tank gun. The stock of communications equipment has become so low due to the high losses that command and control is extremely difficult; one corps no longer has any command and control equipment at all. Numerous supply facilities are without their specialized equipment.
4.) The panzer divisions are only mobile to a limited extent, the panzer regiments are worn-out, and most of them are currently without operational tanks. The divisions have thus lost their character and value as panzer divisions. The losses in armoured vehicles were not even remotely compensated for by the reassignments or the corresponding supply of spare parts.
[...]
8.) The mood and attitude of the troops were often depressed by the high number of casualties and the heavy mental and physical strain. They will only be lifted again when the front is strengthened and refitting will begin. The contradiction between the shortage of weapons and especially of ammunition, which had been noticeable at the front for a long time, and the sufficient production of weapons and ammunition constantly mentioned in the propaganda, which is clearly recognizable to every soldier, has a significant impact on the mood.

Just how badly depleted the units were can be shown by the example of the 16th Panzergrenadier Division and 9th Panzer Division. As of 21 February 1944, both divisions were rated as having Kampfwert IV (Combat Value 4), meaning that they were fit for limited defensive operations only. The combat strength of their infantry battalions were the following.

Combat strength (Gefechtsstärke) of panzergrenadier battalions as of 21 February 1944
Unit	Authorized combat strength	Actual combat strength	%
9th Panzer Division			
Panzergrenadier-Regiment 10:			
1st Battalion	800	215	27
2nd Battalion	800	107	13
Panzergrenadier-Regiment 11:			
2nd Battalion (1st disbanded)	800	178	22
16th Panzergrenadier Division
Panzergrenadier Regiment 60:			
1st Battalion	800	269	35
2nd Battalion	800	250	31
Panzergrenadier Regiment 156:			
1st Battalion	800	306	38
2nd Battalion	800	472	59

One month later, on 25 March 1944, remnants of these divisions were ordered to pull out from Ukraine and move to the OB West area for rebuilding – 9th Panzer Division moved to Carcassonne area near French Mediterranean coast, while the 16th Panzergrenadier Division moved to the area northwest of Paris.

Eight German infantry, three Panzer, and one Panzergrenadier divisions lost more than half of their numbers. The elimination of the Nikopol bridgehead enabled the 4th Ukrainian Front to launch the Crimean offensive without fear of the German forces attacking its rear. Favorable conditions for the subsequent Odessa offensive were created by the capture of the Inhulets bridgeheads.

During the operation, the 8th and 17th Air Armies flew 10,700 sorties. According to Soviet documents, they claimed 140 German aircraft in more than 100 air battles and destroyed 39 on the ground. Both air armies also delivered fuel and ammunition to the troops, and the 17th Air Army alone flew 2,136 transport sorties, delivering around 320 tons of supplies and evacuating 1,260 wounded.

== Notes ==
1. Equivalent to a U.S. Army general.
2. Equivalent to a U.S. Army general of the army.
3. Equivalent to a U.S. Army major general.
4. Equivalent to a U.S. Army lieutenant general.

== Bibliography ==
- Erickson, John (1999) [1983]. Stalin's War with Germany: The Road to Berlin. New Haven: Yale University Press. ISBN 9780300078138.
- Forczyk, Robert (2016). The Dnepr 1943: Hitler's Eastern Rampart Crumbles. Oxford: Osprey. ISBN 9781472812377.
- Frieser, Karl-Heinz, ed. (2017) [2007]. Germany and the Second World War. Vol. VIII: The Eastern Front, 1943–1944: The War in the East and on the Neighbouring Fronts. Oxford: Oxford University Press. ISBN 9780198723462.
- Glantz, David (1989). Soviet Military Deception in the Second World War. London: Frank Cass. ISBN 9780714633473.
- Gurkin, Vladimir; et al. (1988). Боевой состав Советской армии: Часть IV (Январь — декабрь 1944 г.) [Combat Composition of the Soviet Army, Part IV (January–December 1944)] (PDF) (in Russian). Moscow: Voenizdat.
- Hinze, Rolf (2009). Crucible of Combat: Germany's Defensive Battles in the Ukraine 1943–44. Translated by Frederick P. Steinhardt. Solihull: Helion. ISBN 9781906033392.
- Moschansky, Ilya (2011). Освобождение Правобережной Украины [The Liberation of Right-Bank Ukraine] (in Russian). Moscow: Veche. ISBN 9785953352369.
- Tessin, Georg (1967). Verbände und Truppen der deutschen Wehrmacht und Waffen-SS im Zweiten Weltkrieg 1939–1945 [Formations and Units of the German Wehrmacht and Waffen-SS in World War II, 1939–1945] (in German). Vol. Band 3: Die Landstreitkräfte 6–14 [Volume 3: The land forces. 6–14]. Frankfurt-am-Main: E.S. Mittler & Sohn. OCLC 475474715.
- Ziemke, Earl F. (2002) [1968]. Stalingrad to Berlin: The German Defeat in the East. Washington, D.C.: United States Army Center of Military History. OCLC 1013364845. Archived from the original on 11 January 2012.

Military documents

- Burenin, Major General I.N.; Potalin, Major (1944). "Журнал боевых действий войск 3 УкрФ, Период с 01.01.1944 по 31.01.1944 г." [Combat Journal of the 3rd Ukrainian Front, for the period 1–31 January 1944]. Pamyat Naroda (in Russian). Ministry of Defense of the Russian Federation. (Central Archives of the Russian Ministry of Defence, fond 243, opus 2900, file 831)
- Tarasov, Colonel; Levshuk, Lieutenant Colonel (1944a). "Журнал боевых действий войск 4 УкрФ, Период с 01.01.1944 по 31.01.1944 г." [Combat Journal of the 4th Ukrainian Front, for the period 1–31 January 1944]. Pamyat Naroda (in Russian). Ministry of Defense of the Russian Federation. (Central Archives of the Russian Ministry of Defence, fond 244, opus 3000, file 764)
- Tarasov, Colonel; Levshuk, Lieutenant Colonel (1944b). "Журнал боевых действий войск 4 УкрФ, Период с 01.02.1944 по 29.02.1944 г." [Combat Journal of the 4th Ukrainian Front, for the period 1–29 February 1944]. Pamyat Naroda (in Russian). Ministry of Defense of the Russian Federation. (Central Archives of the Russian Ministry of Defence, fond 244, opus 3000, file 785)
