= Habibullah Huseynov =

Iranian-born Soviet Azerbaijani Red Army colonel (1910–1945)

- Native name: Həbibulla Eynulla oğlu Hüseynov
- Born: 10 October 1910; Ardabil, Qajar Iran
- Died: 16 April 1945 (aged 34) north of Fischhausen, East Prussia, Nazi Germany
- Allegiance: Soviet Union
- Branch: Red Army
- Service years: 1928–1945
- Rank: Colonel
- Commands: 67th Anti-Aircraft Artillery Division
- Conflicts: World War II; Operation Barbarossa; Battle of Stalingrad; Donbas Strategic Offensive; Baltic Offensive; East Prussian Offensive; Samland Offensive †
- Awards: Hero of the Soviet Union; Order of Lenin; Order of the Red Banner (2x); Order of the Patriotic War, 1st class

Habibullah Huseynov (Russian: Габибулла Ейнуллаевич Гусейнов; 10 October 1910 – 16 April 1945) was an Iranian Azerbaijani Red Army colonel and a posthumous Hero of the Soviet Union. Huseynov emigrated to Baku, working as a loader and a fitter. He was drafted into the Red Army on a Komsomol direction in 1928 and became an artillery officer. He was arrested and imprisoned as an Iranian spy during the Great Purge. He was released months later and became an anti-aircraft artillery battalion commander, serving in this role during World War II.

After his unit, part of the 13th Rifle Division, was encircled in western Belarus following the Germans' launch of Operation Barbarossa, Huseynov led the remnants of his command in a breakout. The battalion was then reorganized and provided air defense for Kalinin and Rybinsk. In June 1942, Huseynov became commander of an anti-aircraft battalion defending Ivanovo. In October 1942, he became commander of an anti-aircraft artillery regiment, which transferred to the 1st Guards Army two months later. The regiment fought in the Tatsinskaya Raid while attached to the 24th Tank Corps. Between June and September 1943 Huseynov was chief of staff of the 4th Anti-Aircraft Artillery Division. In September 1943, he took command of the 67th Anti-Aircraft Artillery Division, which he led until his death. The division fought in the Baltic Offensive, Courland Pocket, East Prussian Offensive, and Samland Offensive. Huseynov was killed in action during the Samland Offensive on 16 April 1945.

== Early life and interwar military service ==
Huseynov was born on 10 October 1910 in Ardabil in a working-class family. He worked as a loader at the port of Baku and studied at a night school for working youth, graduating from seventh grade. Huseynov then worked as an apprentice fitter at the Lieutenant Schmidt Plant.

Huseynov was drafted into the Red Army in 1928 on a Komsomol direction. In 1929, he joined the Communist Party of the Soviet Union. He graduated from the Transcaucasian Infantry School in June 1932 and from the Artillery Commanders Refresher Courses in Baku in September. In September Huseynov became a platoon commander in the 193rd Artillery Regiment of the Red Banner Caucasus Army, based in Baku. In April 1934, he became a battery commander of the 190th Anti-Aircraft Artillery Regiment. In September he transferred back to the 193rd Regiment, becoming a battery commander, a divizion senior adjutant, and a divizion commander. He was promoted to Senior Lieutenant in 1936.

On 3 July 1938 he was promoted to captain. In 1938, Huseynov was arrested by the NKVD on charges of spying for Iran. He spent several months in prison and was released and restored to the Red Army at the end of the year. He became a battalion commander of the 188th Anti-Aircraft Artillery Regiment of the Belorussian Military District in Minsk in May 1939. In February 1940, Huseynov became commander of the 312th Separate Anti-Aircraft Artillery Battalion of the 13th Rifle Division in the Western Special Military District at Zambrów.

== World War II ==
Huseynov fought in World War II from 22 June 1941. The battalion was encircled in Western Belarus and broke out. In June 1941, the battalion reportedly shot down two German aircraft. In July, the battalion was reorganized and transferred to the Kalinin Air Defense Area. On 30 September Huseynov was wounded. In November 1941 he was promoted to major. The battalion fought in the Battle of Moscow. In February 1942, the battalion transferred to the Rybinsk-Yaroslavl Air Defense Area. In June 1942, Huseynov took command of the 38th Separate Anti-Aircraft Artillery Battalion, defending Ivanovo. In October, he became commander of the 658th Anti-Aircraft Artillery Regiment of the Moscow Air Defense Front. On 20 October he was promoted to lieutenant colonel. In December the regiment became part of the 4th Anti-Aircraft Artillery Division of the Reserve of the Supreme High Command. It soon became part of the 1st Guards Army. The regiment participated in Operation Little Saturn and the Millerovo-Voroshilovgrad Offensive, during which it was attached to the 24th Tank Corps. The regiment fought in the Tatsinskaya Raid in December 1942. From 16 December to 10 January 1943 the regiment's gunners reportedly shot down 21 aircraft, destroyed three tanks and killed numerous German soldiers. On 10 February Huseynov was wounded a second time. On 25 February, he was awarded the Order of the Red Banner. In April 1943, the regiment became the 268th Guards Anti-Aircraft Artillery Regiment. On 5 April he was awarded a second Order of the Red Banner. On 23 April, Huseynov was promoted to colonel.

In June 1943, Huseynov became chief of staff of the 4th Anti-Aircraft Artillery Division. He fought in the Donbas Strategic Offensive. In September 1943, he became commander of the new 67th Anti-Aircraft Artillery Division in the Moscow Military District. The division defended the Moscow Industrial Region while conducting training. From July 1944 the division fought on the 1st Baltic Front. The division fought in the Baltic Offensive's Riga Offensive and Battle of Memel, during which it reportedly shot down 59 German aircraft. On 3 November, Huseynov was awarded the Order of the Red Star. The division then fought in the Courland Pocket. During the East Prussian Offensive between January and April 1945, the division provided anti-aircraft cover for military units. On 24 January, Huseynov was awarded the Order of the Patriotic War 1st class. During the Samland Offensive in April, the division advanced its guns to provide fire support to the infantry. Huseynov directed their fire from the forward area. On 16 April Huseynov was killed in action north of Fischhausen. He was buried in the Marijampolė Officers Cemetery. On 29 June 1945, he was posthumously awarded the title Hero of the Soviet Union and the Order of Lenin.

== Legacy ==
A trawler of the Ministry of Fisheries was named for Huseynov. In 1995, a memorial was built in his honor on I. Dadashov street in the Binagadi district of Baku.
