= 3rd Anti-Aircraft Artillery Division =

- Active: October 1942–October 1945
- Country: Soviet Union
- Branch: Red Army
- Type: Anti-Aircraft Artillery
- Engagements: World War II
- Decorations: Order of Kutuzov 2nd class; Order of Bogdan Khmelnitsky 2nd class
- Battle honours: Nikopol

The 3rd Anti-Aircraft Artillery Division (Russian: 3-я зенитная артиллерийская дивизия) was an anti-aircraft artillery division of the Soviet Union's Red Army during World War II.

Formed in October 1942, the division was soon sent to the front in the Battle of Stalingrad, providing air defense to the 5th Tank Army. After a brief period in Southwestern Front reserve, the division was sent back into combat with the 6th Army in the Third Battle of Kharkov. The division served with the front, which became the 3rd Ukrainian Front, for the entire war. It supported the 8th Guards Army in the Nikopol–Krivoi Rog Offensive in January 1944, and was awarded the honorific Nikopol for its actions. The division was awarded the Order of Kutuzov and the Order of Bogdan Khmelnitsky for its actions in the war. It was disbanded soon after the end of the war.

== World War II ==
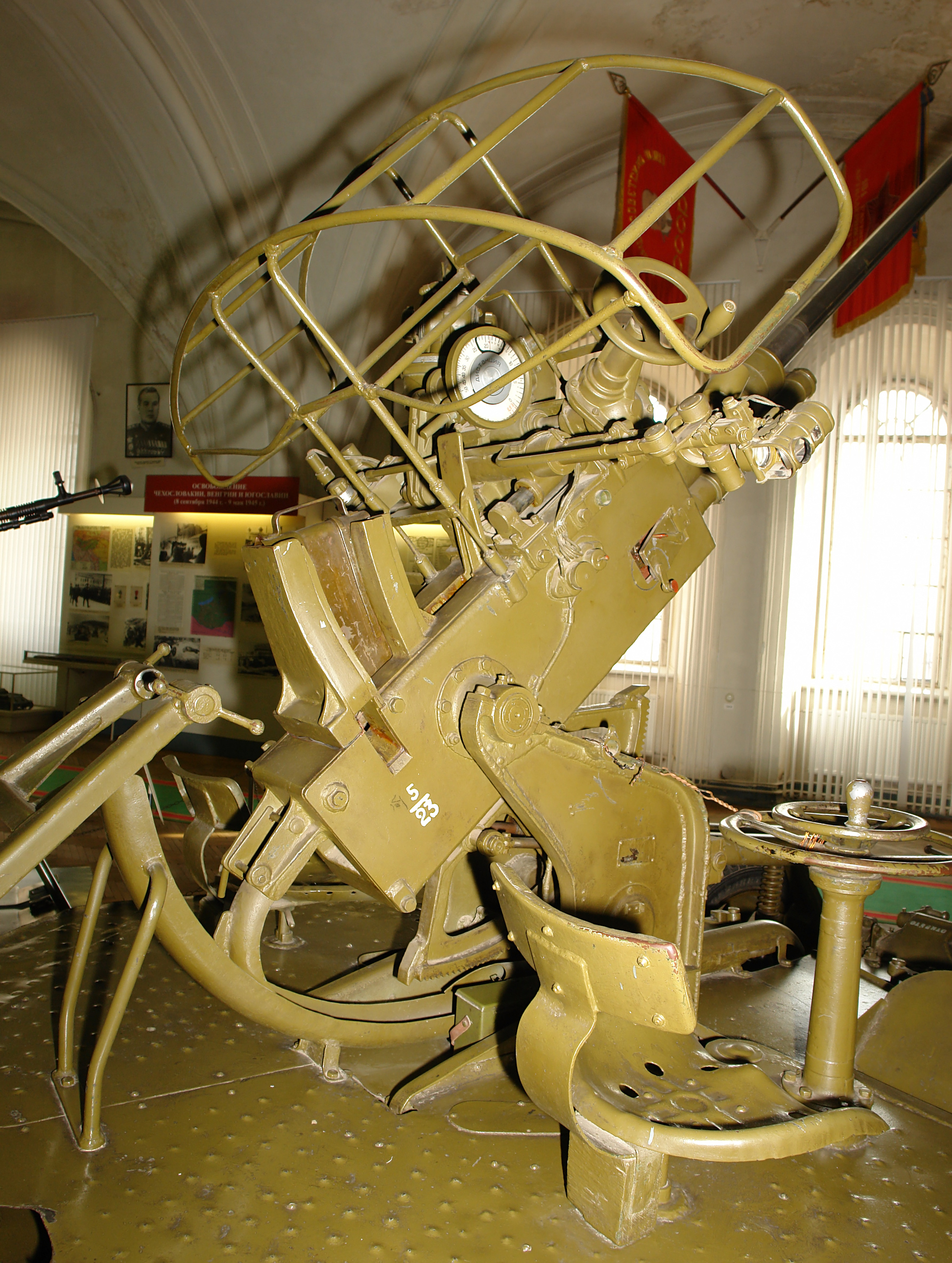
A 37 mm AA gun of the type used by the division during World War II

The 3rd Anti-Aircraft Artillery Division of the Reserve of the Supreme High Command (RVGK) began forming in late October 1942 in the Moscow Military District under the command of Colonel Mikhail Kotikov, who would be promoted to major general on 9 April 1943. The 3rd departed for the Southwestern Front on 2 November, and by 10 November its regiments were providing air defense for rifle divisions of the 5th Tank Army. The division fought in defensive battles and in Operation Uranus, the counteroffensive in the Battle of Stalingrad, and in Operation Little Saturn. In the attack of the Southwestern Front, the 3rd provided air defense for the army's shock group, advancing 150 kilometers. Its regiments were credited with downing 50 and damaging 17 enemy aircraft as well as destroying two tanks and killing up to two companies of infantry. By 1 January, the division included the 1084th, 1089th, 1114th, and the 1118th Anti-Aircraft Artillery Regiments.

By 13 February 1943, the division held positions near Bannoye and Bogorodichnoye as part of the front reserve. It transferred to the 6th Army by 20 February to provide air defense for the rail station at Lozova as well as artillery ammunition dumps there during the German counterattack, Third Battle of Kharkov. Kotikov was appointed commander of the defense of Lozova, and between 25 and 28 February the division fought German tanks and infantry before being forced to retreat. In March, the 1114th and 1118th Regiments were directly subordinated to the front. The entire division was directly subordinated to the front in April and remained thus for most of the rest of the year.

On 7 August, Colonel Savely Chapovsky was appointed division commander. As part of the 3rd Ukrainian Front (redesignated from the Southwestern Front on 20 October), the division covered the 8th Guards Army from December in its attack towards Krivoy Rog and in the subsequent Nikopol–Krivoi Rog Offensive. In January, the division was again directly subordinated to the front, remaining there for the rest of the war. For helping to capture Nikopol on 8 February, the division received the city's name as an honorific. In the spring of 1944, the division fought in the raid into the German rear in Bessarabia. Chapovsky was replaced by deputy division commander Colonel Vasily Gladkov on 31 July before dying of complications from peritonitis on 6 August. The 3rd fought in the elimination of the Axis pocket during the Second Jassy–Kishinev Offensive in the summer. On 7 September it was awarded the Order of Kutuzov, 2nd class for "exemplary fulfillment of command tasks" in breaking through enemy defenses south of Bender and the capture of Kishinev and its "valor and courage". It then advanced into Bulgaria and fought in the Belgrade Offensive. In late 1944 the division moved north into Hungary in the Budapest Offensive, crossing the Danube in the area of Pápa and Dunaföldvár. The 3rd was credited with downing 25 enemy aircraft, destroying 14 pillboxes and 200 vehicles, and killing 4,190 enemy soldiers in 1944. The division was awarded the Order of Bogdan Khmelnitsky, 2nd class, on 6 January 1945 for its performance in the crossing of the Danube and the breakthrough of Axis defenses.

In the spring of 1945, the division provided air defense for the 18th Tank Corps and the 4th Guards Army during the Balaton Defensive Operation, the repulse of Operation Spring Awakening, a German counterattack. It ended the war in the Vienna Offensive, advancing into Austria.

== Postwar ==
After the end of the war, the division was disbanded in October, still under Gladkov's command.
