= 35th Anti-Aircraft Artillery Division =

- Active: March 1943–c. 1947
- Country: Soviet Union
- Branch: Red Army (later Soviet Army)
- Type: Anti-Aircraft Artillery
- Engagements: World War II
- Battle honours: Lower Dniester

The 35th Anti-Aircraft Artillery Division (Russian: 35-я зенитная артиллерийская дивизия) was an anti-aircraft artillery division of the Soviet Union's Red Army (later the Soviet Army) during World War II and the early postwar period.

== World War II ==
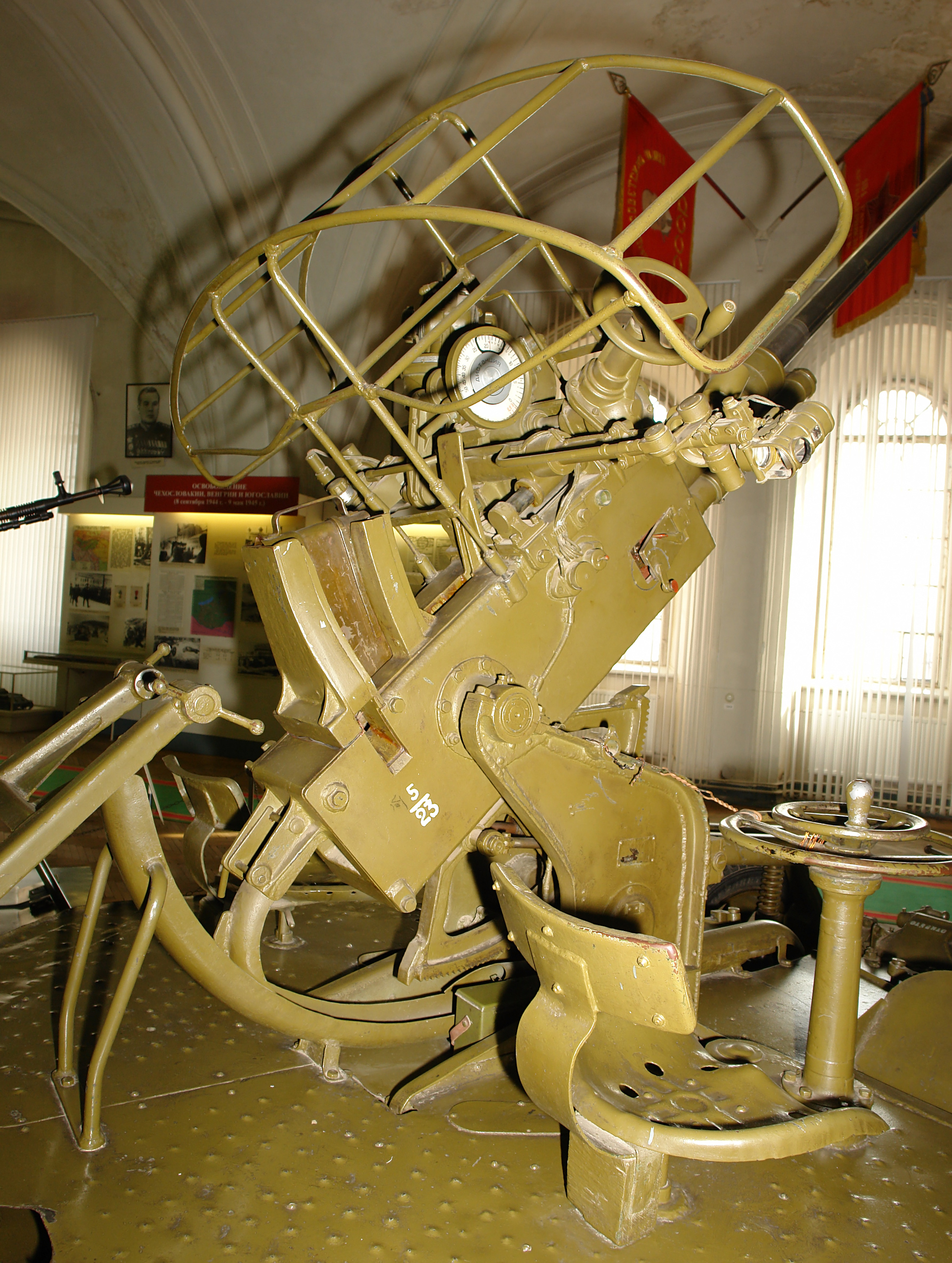
A 37 mm AA gun of the type used by the division during World War II

The 35th Anti-Aircraft Artillery Division of the Reserve of the High Command (RGK) was formed between March and September 1943 at the Anti-Aircraft Artillery Training Camp in Moscow, part of the Moscow Military District. Colonel Nikolai Salmin assumed command of the division on 15 July. After completing its formation, the division was railed to the front between 4 and 5 September in four echelons, joining the 37th Army of the Steppe Front (renamed the 2nd Ukrainian Front on 20 October). The division participated in the recapture of Left-bank Ukraine east of Kremenchug, the Battle of the Dnieper, and the offensive towards Krivoy Rog in late 1943. in January, the division and the 37th Army were transferred to the 3rd Ukrainian Front and fought in the Nikopol–Krivoy Rog offensive, the Bereznegovatoye–Snigirevka offensive, and the Odessa offensive. Salmin was evaluated as having "acted timidly, often losing control of divisional units on the march and in combat operations" during the army's actions in the Liubotyn region and the crossing of the Dnieper and the Southern Bug. As a result, Salmin was relieved of command on 26 March 1944 and replaced by army deputy commander for air defense Colonel Mikhail Slyusarev. The 35th fought in the Second Jassy–Kishinev offensive and the occupation of Bulgaria. The division remained with the 37th Army occupying Bulgaria for the rest of the war.

== Postwar ==
Colonel Fyodor Dmitrievich Rodin took command of the division in September 1945. It continued to serve as part of the 37th Army (converted to the 10th Mechanized Army) in the Southern Group of Forces. The 10th Mechanized Army was disbanded in mid-1947, and in June of that year Rodin transferred to a different post. The division was among those anti-aircraft artillery divisions disbanded without being converted into another unit by the end of the 1950s.
