= 67th Anti-Aircraft Artillery Division =

- Active: September 1943–1940s
- Country: Soviet Union
- Branch: Red Army
- Type: Anti-Aircraft Artillery
- Engagements: World War II: Baltic Offensive; East Prussian Offensive; Samland Offensive
- Battle honours: Koenigsberg

Commanders
- Notable commanders: Habibullah Huseynov

The 67th Anti-Aircraft Artillery Division (Russian: 67-я зенитно-артиллерийская дивизия) was an anti-aircraft artillery division of the Soviet Union's Red Army during World War II. Formed in September 1943, the division fought in the Baltic Offensive, the East Prussian Offensive, and the Samland Offensive. It was disbanded after the end of the war.

== History ==
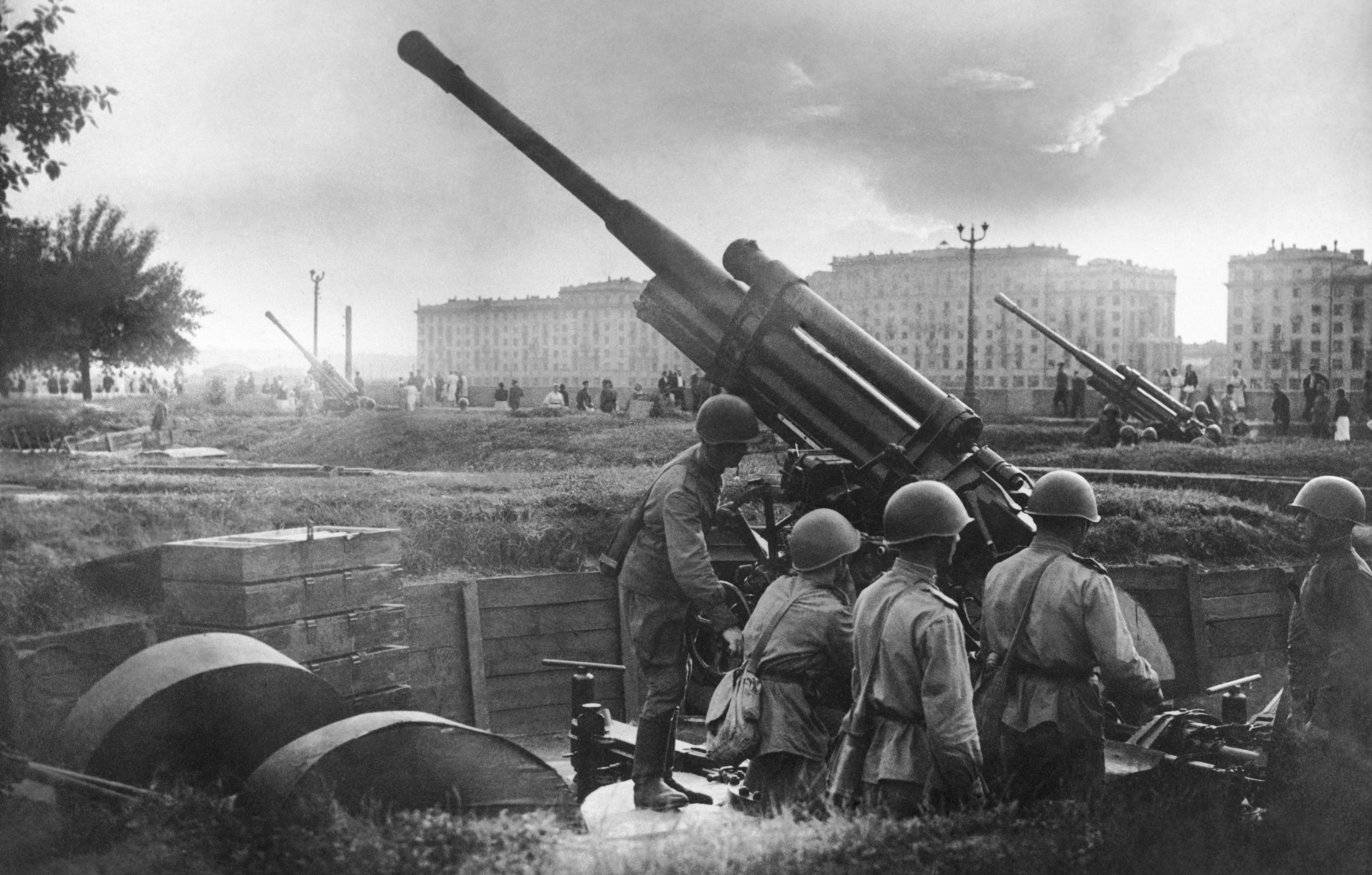
AA guns in Moscow

The division was formed in September 1943 in the Moscow Military District, commanded by Azerbaijani Colonel Habibullah Huseynov from 1 October. For the next several months, the division defended the Moscow Industrial Region while conducting training. The division included the 1982nd, 1986th, 1990th, and the 1994th Anti-Aircraft Artillery Regiments. From July 1944 the division fought on the 1st Baltic Front, and was directly subordinated to it. The division was involved in combat from 31 July. On 1 September it was attached to the 43rd Army. The division fought in the Baltic Offensive's Riga Offensive and Battle of Memel, during which it was reported by superiors to have shot down 59 German aircraft. The division then fought in the Courland Pocket.

On 1 January 1945, it was still part of the 43rd Army. During the East Prussian Offensive between January and April 1945, the division provided anti-aircraft cover for military units. The division fought in the Battle of Königsberg and for its actions was awarded the honorific "Koenigsberg" after the city's capture on 9 April. On 1 February, the division was attached to the 6th Guards Army. On 1 March 1945 the division was directly subordinated to the Samland Group of Forces. The division became part of the 39th Army on or before 1 April. During the Samland Offensive in April, the division advanced its guns to provide fire support to the infantry of the army. Huseynov directed their fire from the forward area. On 16 April Huseynov was killed in action north of Fischhausen. He would later be awarded the title Hero of the Soviet Union.

On 17 April, Colonel Konstantin Kunikov took command of the division, leading it until after the end of the war. Before 1 May, the 39th Army was sent into the reserve and the 67th stayed with the 3rd Belorussian Front. The division fought until the end of the war on 9 May. Kunikov led the division until September, when he transferred to command the 12th Anti-Aircraft Artillery Division. The division was disbanded within several years of the end of the war.

== Commanders ==
The following officers commanded the division during World War II:

- Colonel Habibullah Huseynov (1 October 1943–killed in action 16 April 1945)
- Colonel Konstantin Kunikov (17 April 1945–after 9 May 1945)
