= 1st Guards Anti-Aircraft Artillery Division =

- Active: June 1943–1960
- Country: Soviet Union
- Branch: Soviet Air Defense Forces
- Type: Anti-Aircraft Artillery
- Garrison/HQ: Moscow
- Engagements: World War II

Commanders
- Notable commanders: Mikhail Kiknadze

The 1st Guards Anti-Aircraft Artillery Division PVO (Russian: 1-я гвардейская зенитная артиллерийская дивизия ПВО) was an anti-aircraft artillery division of the Soviet Union's Air Defense Forces (PVO) during World War II and the Cold War.

It traced its origins back to an artillery battery of the Russian Civil War that was expanded into a battalion and a regiment between the wars. At the end of the 1930s it was relocated to Moscow as the 193rd Anti-Aircraft Artillery Regiment, and provided air defense for the city during World War II. It was converted into the 72nd Guards Anti-Aircraft Artillery Regiment in November 1942, and expanded into the 1st Guards Anti-Aircraft Artillery Division in June 1943. The division covered a sector of the air defense of the city until its disbandment in 1960.

== Before 1941 ==
The division traced its history back to the formation of the 2nd Anti-Aircraft Railway Battery of the Steel Putilov Battalion in November 1917 at the Putilov Factory, shortly after the October Revolution. The unit was formed in order to provide air defense against the aviation of anti-Bolshevik forces, and included workers from the Putilov Factory. The battery saw action in the suppression of Pyotr Krasnov's attempt to restore the Russian Provisional Government, and on 13 March 1918 claimed two German Albatros fighters downed near Pskov. From November it fought against the North Russia Intervention in the Russian Civil War as part of the 6th Army, claiming eight aircraft downed. For its "courage and valor" in battles at Plesetsk station in October and November 1919, the battery was awarded the Honorary Revolutionary Red Banner on 7 February 1920. It subsequently fought against the Armed Forces of South Russia on the Rostov-Kislovodsk and Makhachkala railway lines, then advanced south to participate in the Red Army invasion of Georgia. From 1922, the unit provided air defense for the Baku oil fields on the Caspian coast.

In 1927, the battery was reorganized as the 90th Separate Anti-Aircraft Artillery Battalion, becoming the 3rd Baku Regiment PVO on 5 December 1928 and the 60th Anti-Aircraft Artillery Regiment PVO in 1930. In 1938, the regiment was relocated to Moscow to strengthen its air defenses after being redesignated as the 193rd Anti-Aircraft Artillery Regiment, receiving new 85 mm and 37 mm anti-aircraft guns, along with PUAZO-3 fire control devices and DCh optical rangefinders. In March 1939, Major Mikhail Kiknadze took command of the 193rd Anti-Aircraft Artillery Regiment, part of the Soviet air defense forces defending Moscow, the 1st Air Defense Corps. It was responsible for the southwestern sector: the Tushino Airfield, Minsk highway, and Moscow Canal.

== World War II ==
After Operation Barbarossa, the German invasion of the Soviet Union, began on 22 June 1941, the regiment became part of the Moscow Air Defense Front. On the night of 21 July, it was involved in the repulse of a German air raid, claiming two planes downed out of 22 shot down that night. On 21 October, two batteries from the 193rd were among the six anti-aircraft batteries with 211 guns sent to the front to serve in an anti-tank role during the Battle of Moscow; they were credited with destroying 21 tanks, three mortar batteries, two armored vehicles, and seven bunkers, as well as killing more than 200 German soldiers. It defended against German air raids on Moscow, and was credited with downing 38 aircraft by 29 December. The 193rd helped repulse small groups of German aircraft attempting to raid Moscow in bad weather on 6 January 1942. For "successful fulfillment of command tasks, organization, and discipline of personnel", the 193rd was converted into the 72nd Guards Anti-Aircraft Artillery Regiment on 7 November, the first Guards unit in the Air Defense Forces.

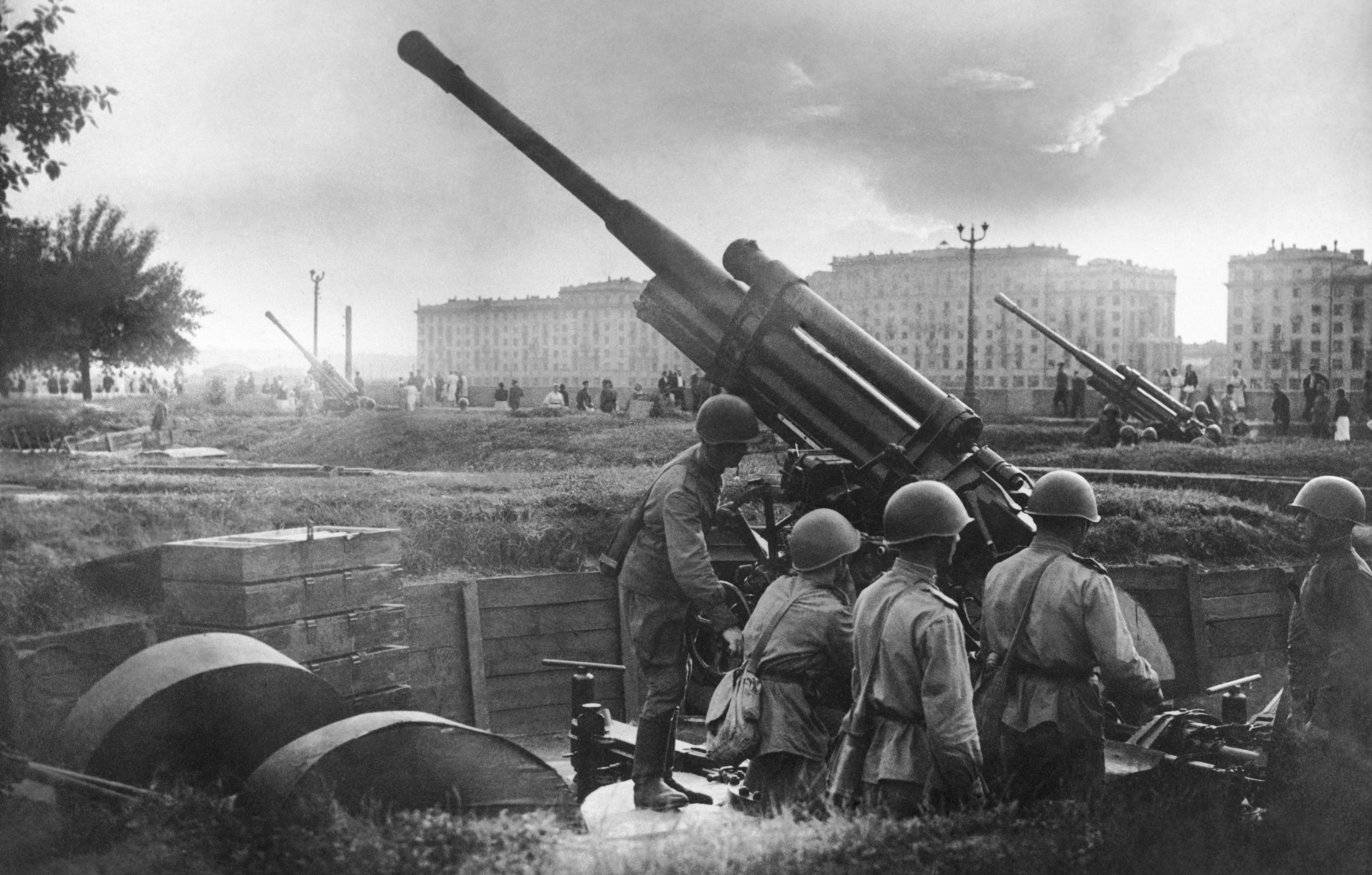
Preparing AA guns for a training exercise in Moscow, c. 1943

On 3 June 1943, the regiment was expanded into the 1st Guards Anti-Aircraft Artillery Division of the Special Moscow Air Defense Army, under Colonel Kiknadze's command. It included the 236th, 237th, 240th, 242nd, and 244th Guards Anti-Aircraft Artillery Regiments, the 1st Guards Searchlight Regiment, and the 32nd Guards Separate Anti-Aircraft Artillery Battalion with light guns. The division's regiments were expanded from the 193rd's battalions. For the rest of the war, the 1st Guards provided defense against German air raids for the western sector of the Moscow Air Defense Zone. After the front moved farther away from Moscow, the division saw progressively less combat. Kiknadze was promoted to Major General on 18 November 1944. In 1945, the division participated in the May Day parade on Red Square. On 24 June, Kiknadze led a contingent of eight batteries with 32 85mm guns and 34 vehicles from the division in the Moscow Victory Parade.

== Postwar ==
After the end of the war, Kiknadze continued to command the division until January 1951, when he was promoted to become deputy commander of the Moscow Air Defense Region's anti-aircraft artillery. The division became part of the Moscow Air Defense Area in 1948 when the Air Defense Forces in the Moscow area were reorganized, transferring to the Moscow Air Defense District in a 1954 reorganization. Major General Vasily Gladkov commanded the division between May 1953 and January 1957. By 1955, the division included three regiments: the 47th, 236th, and 240th Guards Anti-Aircraft Artillery Regiments. Its command post was located in the Maryino-Znamenskoye area. In mid-1960, the division was disbanded, after gradually being replaced by the 1st Special Purpose Air Defense Army as surface-to-air missiles replaced anti-aircraft guns. The 1st Guards were the last of the Moscow area anti-aircraft artillery divisions to disband.

The lineage of the division's 236th Regiment is continued by the 42nd Guards Anti-Aircraft Rocket Regiment, and that of the 240th Regiment by the 79th Guards Anti-Aircraft Rocket Brigade, disbanded in 2001.
