= Central Archives of the Russian Ministry of Defence =

- Центральный архив Министерства обороны Российской Федерации; Tsentralny Arkhiv Ministerstva Oborony Rossiskoy Federatsiy
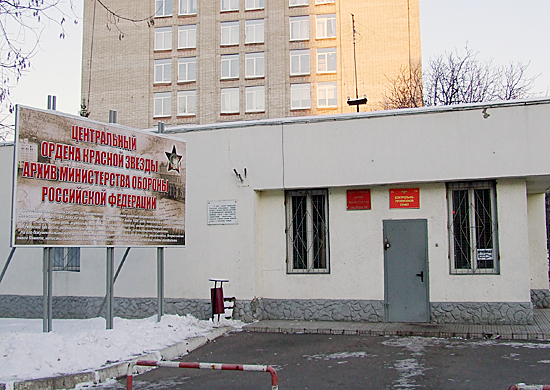

Department overview
- Formed: July 2, 1936
- Type: military
- Jurisdiction: Government of Russia
- Headquarters: Podolsk; 55°25′27.3″N 37°30′42.1″E
- Parent Ministry: Ministry of Defence
- Website: fstec.ru

The Central Archives of the Ministry of Defence of the Russian Federation (Russian: Федеральное государственное казённое учреждение «Центральный архив Министерства обороны Российской Федерации (войсковая часть 00500)» (ЦАМО РФ); TsAMO RF) are located in Podolsk, just south of the city of Moscow.

As a departmental archive of Russia, it stores documents of different staffs and offices, associations and formations, units, institutions and military academies of the Soviet Defence Ministry from 1941 until the end of the 1980s. It comes under the command of the Rear Services of the Armed Forces of Russia. It has data on the history, culture and military education of the Ministry of Defence (Russia). Founded in 1936, the archive moved to Podolsk in Moscow Oblast around 1946. In 1992 a branch of TsAMO was established in Pugachyov in Saratov Oblast.

Colonel Igor Albertovich Permyakov serves as head of the archivе, in post in 2010 and still as of 2018.

== History ==
TsAMO was founded on 2 July 1936 as the archives department of the People's Commissariat of Defense of the Soviet Union (NKO). In 1941, it was evacuated to the town of Buzuluk in Orenburg Oblast. The department was renamed the History and Archives Department of the NKO in 1943, and in 1944 it became the Archives Department of the Administration of the Red Army in the NKO. In 1946, the department was relocated to Podolsk, taking over the former site of a military school. On 21 July 1947, the department became the Archive of the Ministry of the Armed Forces of the Soviet Union. On 25 February 1950, it became the Archive of the Military Ministry of the Soviet Union, and on 15 March 1953 the Archive of the Ministry of Defense of the Soviet Union.

On 15 November 1975, the archive was renamed the Central Archive of the Ministry of Defense of the Soviet Union. It briefly served as the Central Archives of the Unified Armed Forces of the Commonwealth of Independent States from 12 March 1992 before becoming the Central Archives of the Ministry of Defense of Russia on 10 June 1992.

In late March 2008 media reported unofficially that during the visit to TsAMO of Defence Minister Anatoliy Serdyukov, it was decided to close TsAMO and transfer of territory for building an archive.

== Structure ==
TsAMO Russia keeps some 90,000 funds, including 18,600,000 units of storage. The organization funds are in general conformity with the principles of the organization of the Soviet Armed Forces: independent foundations are documents departments of the central apparatus of the Ministry of Defense, offices of military districts, armies, departments, divisions, units and individual agencies.

TsAMO's structure includes more than a dozen departments, including the following departments that store documents on the integration of personnel:

- 2nd Department – provides Award Documents (instructions on decorating and decorations sheets)
- 5th Department – contains the personal files of officers and generals
- 6th Department – contains documents on the political composition of the Red Army, including a card-index file of record losses and
- 9th Department – includes a card index of losses of NCOs and other ranks, as well as a card index of those held captive and liberated by Soviet troops
- 11-second section – contains four files:
  1. a personal account of the officer and the general's convoy
  2. loss of officers and the general's convoy
  3. war generals and officers who died in captivity
  4. awarded orders and medals for all personnel of the Red Army (including privates and sergeants)

== Names ==
- In 1943 it was renamed the Historical and Archival Department of the People's Commissariat of Defense.
- In 1944 — the Department of the Red Army Archives of the People's Commissariat of Defense.
- From July 21, 1947 — the Archive of the USSR Ministry of Armed Forces.
- From February 25, 1950 — the Archive of the USSR Ministry of War.
- From March 15, 1953 — the Archive of the USSR Ministry of Defense (USSR MO).
- From November 15, 1975 — the Central Archive of the USSR Ministry of Defense (CA MOD USSR).
- From March 12, 1992 — the Central Archive of the United Armed Forces of the Commonwealth of Independent States.
- From June 10, 1992 — the Central Archive of the Ministry of Defense of the Russian Federation.
- Since January 1, 2010 — Federal State Budgetary Institution “Central Archives of the Ministry of Defense of the Russian Federation (military unit 00500)”.
