= 4th Anti-Aircraft Artillery Division =

- Active: October 1942–April 1947
- Country: Soviet Union
- Branch: Red Army (Soviet Army from 1946)
- Type: Anti-Aircraft Artillery
- Engagements: World War II
- Decorations: Order of Bogdan Khmelnitsky 2nd class
- Battle honours: Lower Dniester

The 4th Anti-Aircraft Artillery Division (Russian: 4-я зенитная артиллерийская дивизия) was an anti-aircraft artillery division of the Soviet Union's Red Army during World War II and the Soviet Army in the early postwar years.

Formed in November 1942, the division was soon sent to the front in December during the Battle of Stalingrad, providing air defense to the 1st Guards Army. In the spring of 1943 the 4th was directly subordinated to the headquarters of the Southwestern Front. The division served with the front, which became the 3rd Ukrainian Front, for the entire war. It supported the 5th Shock Army in the advance to the Dniester in May 1944, and was awarded the honorific Lower Dniester for its actions. The division was awarded Order of Bogdan Khmelnitsky for its actions in the Balaton Defensive Operation in the spring of 1945. It was disbanded in 1947, remaining in Eastern Europe postwar as part of Soviet occupation forces there.

== World War II ==
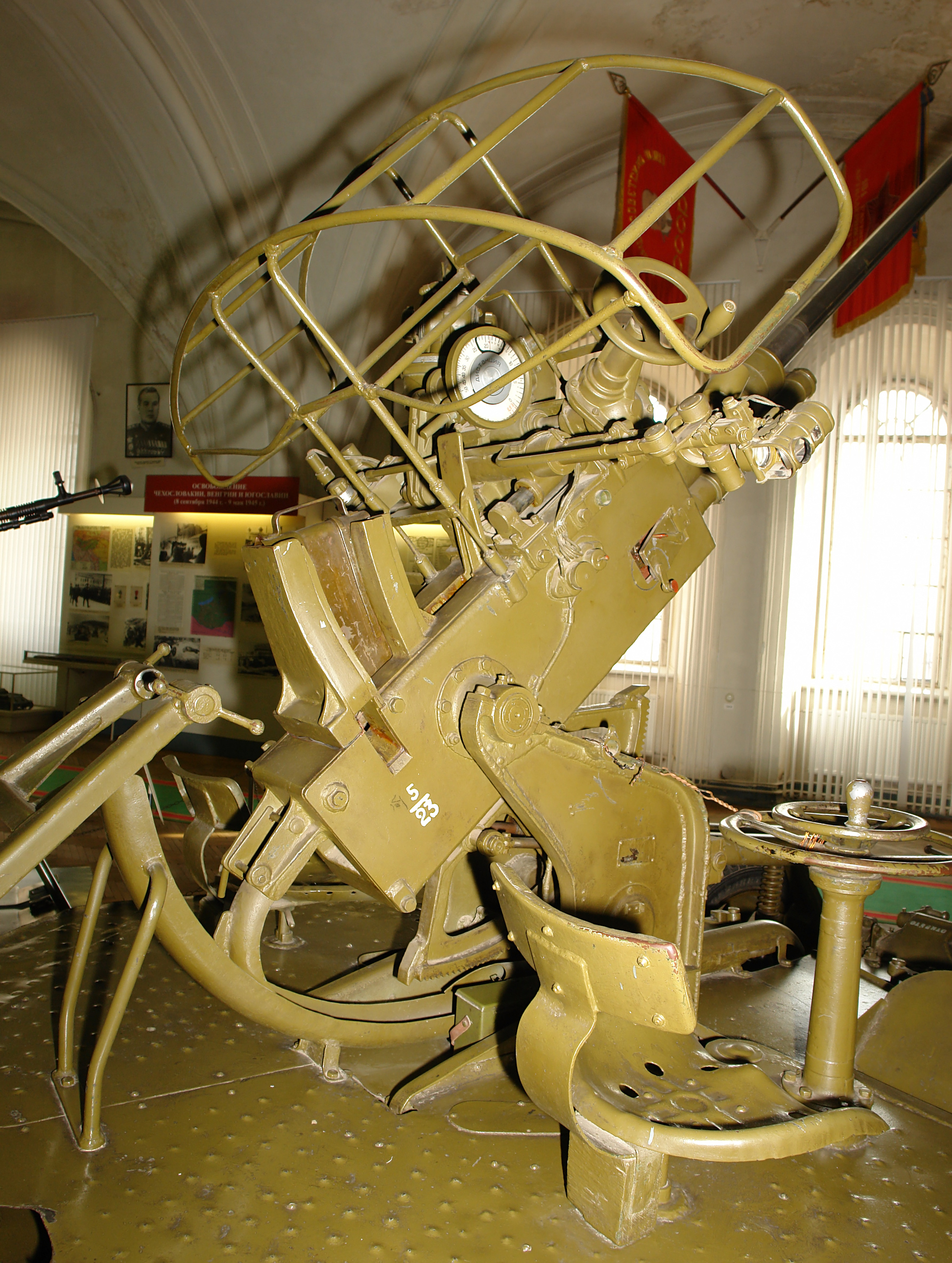
A 37 mm AA gun of the type used by the division during World War II

The 4th Anti-Aircraft Artillery Division of the Reserve of the Supreme High Command (RVGK) began forming in early November 1942 in the Moscow Military District under the command of Colonel (promoted to Major General on 7 August 1943) Artyom Makashutin, who was appointed on 11 November. The 4th departed for the Southwestern Front after completing its formation by 26 November, and arrived between 3 and 4 December in the area of Kalach and Buturlinovka. The regiments of the division covered the troops of the 1st Guards Army in their concentration and deployment areas before the beginning of Operation Little Saturn, a Soviet offensive during the Battle of Stalingrad. During the offensive, the regiments moved forward with the army troops, covering the mobile groups of the army's rifle and mechanized corps. They also used their guns in a direct fire role against Axis tanks and infantry, and provided cover for the combat detachments of the 18th Tank Corps and 5th Mechanized Corps, directly subordinated to the front. By 1 January, the division included the 606th, 633rd, 640th, and 658th Anti-Aircraft Artillery Regiments.

During January and February 1943, the division advanced into the Donbas alongside the army. Between 12 December 1942 and 25 February 1943, it was credited with downing 114 Axis aircraft, destroying fourteen tanks, ten halftracks, and 21 vehicles, in addition to killing around 800 Axis soldiers. The 658th Regiment was detached to the 3rd Guards Army in February. In March, its units provided air defense for bridgeheads on the western bank of the Seversky Donets near Svyatogorsk, Izyum, and Balakleya, repulsing large German air raids. By April the division was directly subordinated to the front headquarters; it would remain there for most of the rest of the war. It was withdrawn to the Millerovo area from 25 April to the first half of May for reorganization. On 25 June, the 633rd and 640th Regiments became the 253rd and 254th Guards Anti-Aircraft Artillery Regiments, respectively. The 658th Regiment was converted into the 268th Guards on 10 August. From August, the 4th fought in the advance through the Donbas and Left-bank Ukraine, as well as the Battle of the Dnieper, as part of the Southwestern Front, which became the 3rd Ukrainian Front on 20 October. In 1943 the division was credited with downing 58 Axis aircraft.

In February 1944, the 4th fought in the attack towards Nikolayev and Odessa. It provided air defense for ammunition and supply depots, airfields of the 17th Air Army, and bridges of the 3rd Ukrainian Front until March, guarding rear facilities. From 20 May the division covered the 5th Shock Army and later other front troops in the advance to and the crossing of the Dniester. On 25 May, Makashutin was replaced by Colonel Pyotr Shelko, who led the division for the rest of its existence. With the 46th Army, the division fought in the breakthrough of the German-Romanian positions at Chobruchi and covered the army in its advance to the Danube, before being withdrawn into the front reserve. For "exemplary completion of command tasks", the 4th received the honorific Lower Dniester for its actions. In the front reserve, the division covered the Danube crossing on the Romanian-Bulgarian border. It then fought in the Belgrade Offensive and advanced into Hungary, covering Danube crossings at Baja, Dunaföldvár, and Dunapentele.

Between 6 and 10 January 1945, the Avenger Battalion was formed in the division for anti-tank operations, armed with captured German 88mm flak guns. The division fought in heavy fighting to cover the crossing at Dunaföldvár and in the Balaton Defensive Operation, the repulse of Operation Spring Awakening, a German counterattack in March. In the latter, German troops broke through the positions of the 1st Guards Fortified Region and the 26th Army. The 4th fought German armor in the Cece area at the line of the Sárvíz Canal, tasked with preventing a German advance to Paks and Dunaföldvár. The Avenger Battalion and the 268th Guards became part of an ad hoc anti-tank region with other artillery units, helping to repulse German attempts to cross the canal. For its actions in the Balaton operation, the division was awarded the Order of Bogdan Khmelnitsky, 2nd class. At the end of the war, the division fought in the Vienna Offensive, defending the surviving Danube bridges.

== Postwar ==
After the end of the war, the division became part of the Southern Group of Forces before transferring to the Central Group of Forces in June 1946. It was disbanded between February and April 1947, after which Shelko transferred to command the 66th Anti-Aircraft Artillery Division.
