= Anti-Aircraft Artillery Division (Soviet Union) =

An Anti-Aircraft Artillery Division (Russian: Зенитная артиллерийская дивизия (зенад), romanized: Zenitnaya artilleriyskaya diviziya (zenad)) was a type of Anti-aircraft unit of the Soviet Union's Red Army, Soviet Army, and the Soviet Air Defense Forces (PVO) during World War II and the early years of the Cold War.

During the Interwar period, units that incorporated anti-aircraft guns, known as Air Defense Divisions, existed in the Soviet Air Defense Forces. However, specialized AA gun divisions were not formed in the Red Army until November 1942. These divisions provided anti-aircraft cover to frontline units and from 1944 were regularly assigned to specific armies. PVO divisions began to be formed in mid-1943, providing air defense for key locations in the rear as well as Moscow. Postwar, most of the anti-aircraft divisions were disbanded, but the small number that remained lasted until the late 1950s, when they were replaced by Surface-to-air missile-equipped brigades and regiments.

== Interwar period ==
Air Defense Divisions were first created in 1932 as part of the Soviet Air Defense Forces. Before 1941, divisional organization was fixed at:

- Division HQ
- two regiments of heavy-caliber anti-aircraft guns
- a battalion of light-caliber AA guns
- a searchlight regiment
- an anti-aircraft machine gun and searchlight regiment (mixed)
- a VNOS (Air Warning, Observation, and Communications) regiment
- a barrage balloon battalion
- combat and service support units

In total, the divisions included between 12,000 and 15,000 men, 120 76mm or 85mm heavy guns, twelve 37mm light-caliber guns, 141 anti-aircraft machine guns, 144 searchlights, and 81 barrage balloons.

== World War II ==
=== Red Army ===
The formation of the first 46 Red Army anti-aircraft artillery divisions was ordered in November 1942; most of these units were formed by combining preexisting anti-aircraft regiments into divisions. The new AA divisions included a small 134-man headquarters and four regiments, with 1,345 men and 48 quad 7.92 mm Maxim guns, 32 12.7mm DShK machine guns, and 48 37 mm guns. The divisions were assigned to combined arms and tank armies to provide air defense for ground troops or to provide air defense for reserves and strategic locations in the rear of fronts.

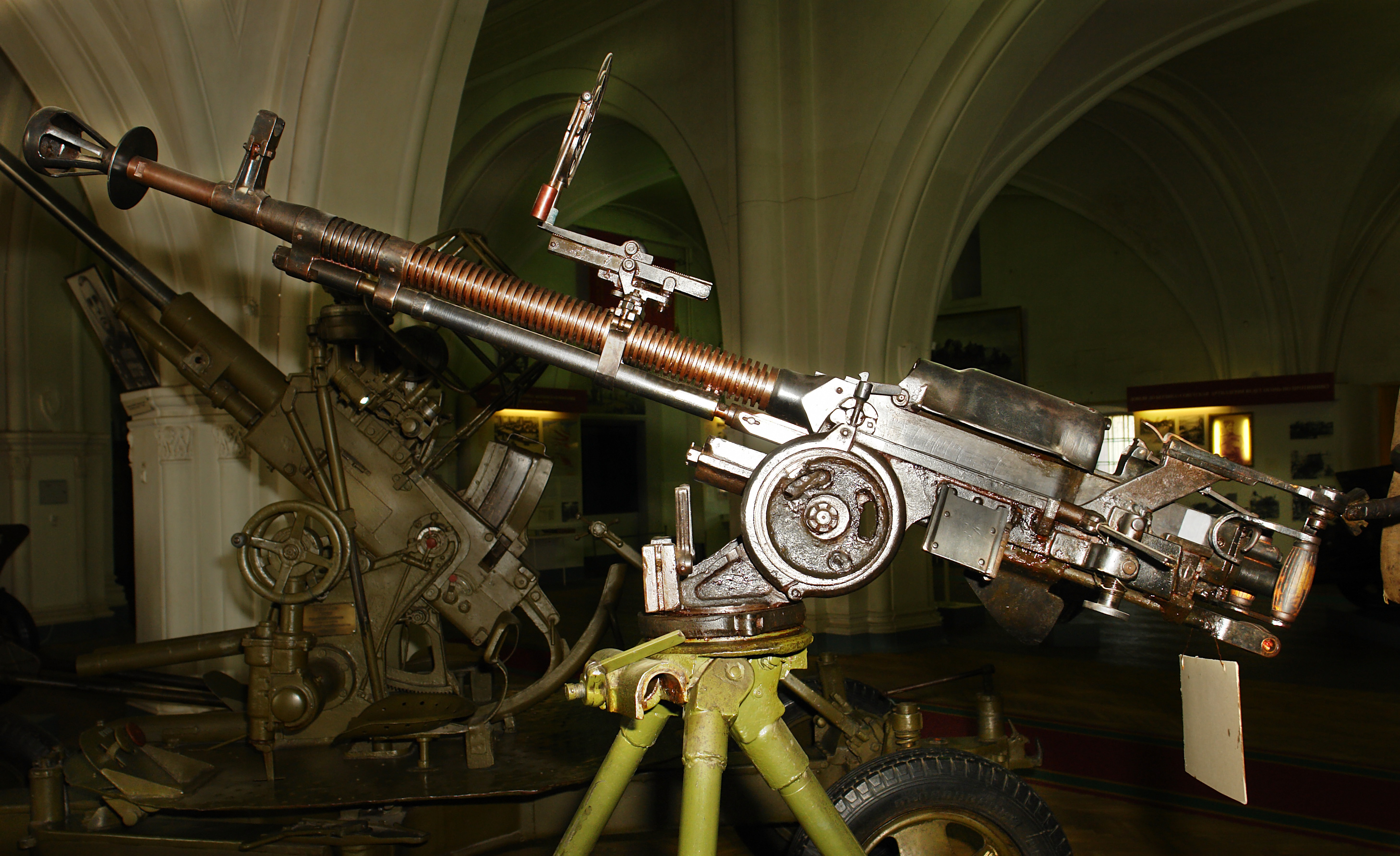
A DShK machine gun used by Red Army AA gunners during World War II

In February 1943, due to their inadequate capabilities against higher-altitude aircraft, the divisions were reorganized to strengthen their weaponry. This involved splitting one of the division's light regiments and transferring its batteries to the remaining regiments to give each of the remaining regiments four batteries totalling sixteen guns each. To replace the fourth regiment, the divisions were given a heavy AA regiment with four batteries with four 85mm guns each. Simultaneously, the Maxim batteries of the light regiments were disbanded and their personnel used to strengthen the DShK-armed companies, doubling the number of platoons, and maintenance units joined the divisions. These changes increased the strength of the divisions to 1,973 men with the addition of 20 more DShKs and sixteen 85mm guns.

During 1943, fourteen more divisions were created, which brought the total number of divisions by the end of that year to 60. In April 1944, the 37mm batteries in the divisions expanded to six guns each, increasing the number of such guns to 72 and the personnel of the light regiments to 518. During that year, anti-aircraft artillery divisions began to be regularly assigned to specific armies.

=== Soviet Air Defense Forces ===
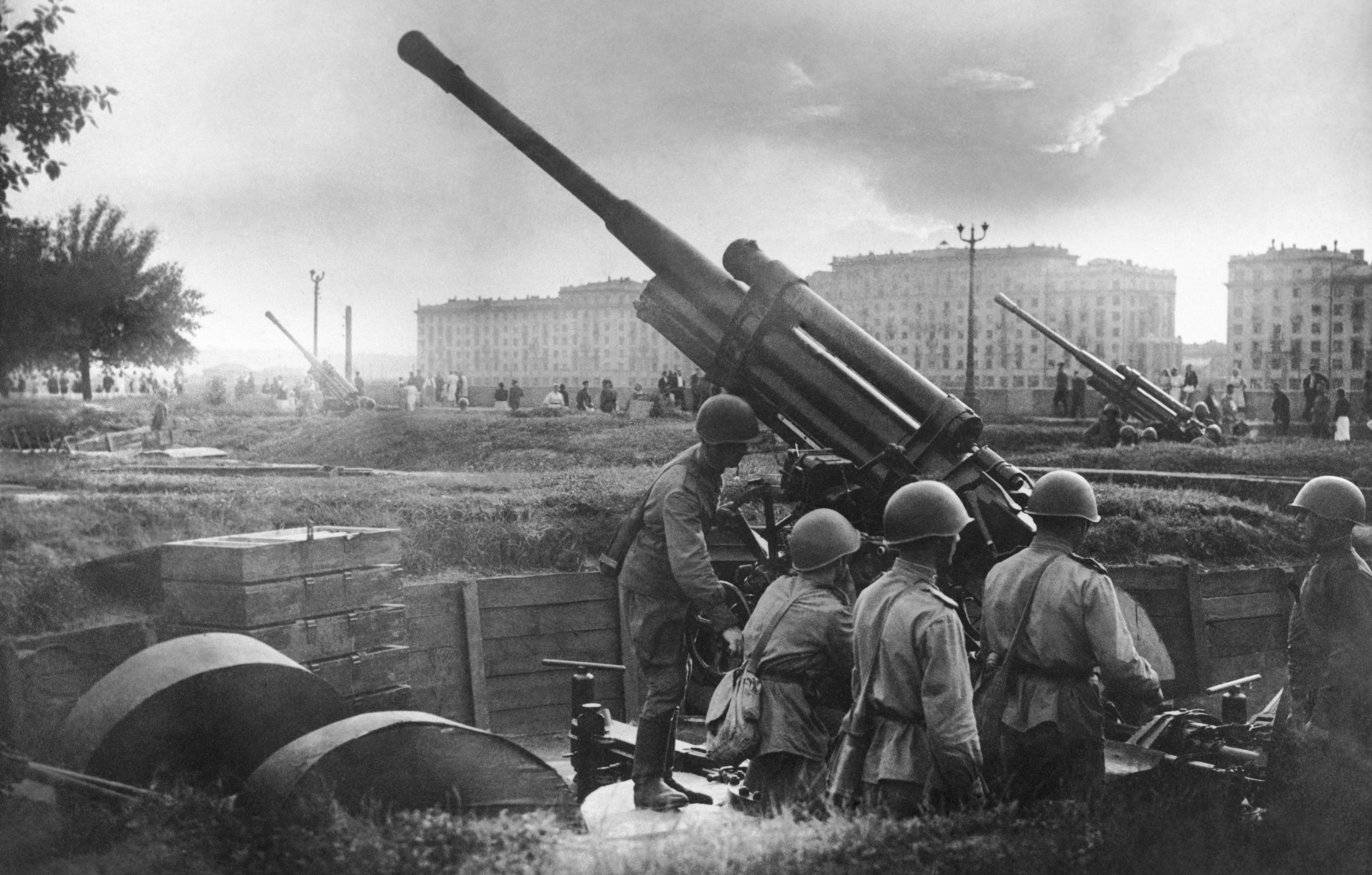
AA guns during a wartime training exercise in Moscow

Specialized Anti-Aircraft Artillery Divisions were first created in the Soviet Air Defense Forces as a result of an order of the People's Commissariat for Defense dated 21 May 1943. In July, the 1st Guards Anti-Aircraft Artillery Division was formed from the 72nd Guards Anti-Aircraft Artillery Regiment. The heavy-caliber PVO divisions consisted of five regiments of heavy-caliber guns with five batteries each and a separate battalion of light-caliber guns, as well as a searchlight regiment. They had a strength of 100 85mm or 76mm heavy guns and twelve 37mm light guns. Light-caliber PVO divisions included five regiments totalling 100 37mm guns. The PVO divisions were employed in concentrations of AA guns and in the defense of Moscow. During the war, some divisions were used to provide air defense in the rear of the front. By the end of the war, there were eighteen PVO AA divisions, including four light.

== Postwar ==
In the postwar period, the remaining anti-aircraft artillery divisions of the PVO were re-equipped with newer 57mm, 100mm, and 130mm guns. By 1960, when AA guns were superseded by Surface-to-air missiles (SAM), all of the PVO divisions had been disbanded or converted into other units. There were 22 anti-aircraft artillery divisions left in the PVO at the beginning of 1959 and this was reduced to 16 a year later.

Postwar Red Army anti-aircraft artillery divisions were reequipped with the 14.5mm ZPU, and 57mm and 100mm AA guns. In the fall of 1945, three new Red Army anti-aircraft artillery divisions were created in the Transbaikal-Amur Military District from new and existing units. In 1946, five wartime army divisions were reorganized into brigades. Two new divisions were formed in the Group of Soviet Occupation Forces in Germany and one in the Belorussian Military District in early 1949. By the end of the 1950s, 45 of the wartime army AA divisions had been disbanded without being redesignated into other units. On 20 March 1958, seven wartime divisions and a postwar division formed two years earlier assigned to the Group of Soviet Forces in Germany were reorganized as anti-aircraft artillery brigades. In August 1958 the remaining army divisions became part of the new Air Defense Forces of the Ground Forces. By 1960 all of the remaining divisions had been reorganized into brigades or SAM-equipped anti-aircraft rocket regiments.
