= 151st Rifle Division =

151st Rifle Division (September 9, 1939 – September 16, 1941) 151st Rifle Division (October 23, 1941 - July 1945)
- Active: 1939–1945
- Country: Soviet Union
- Branch: Red Army
- Type: Infantry
- Size: Division
- Engagements: Operation Barbarossa; Battle of Kiev (1941); Battle of the Caucasus; Battle of Rostov (1943); Donbas strategic offensive (July 1943); Donbas strategic offensive (August 1943); Battle of the Dnieper; Battle of Kiev (1943); Lvov-Sandomierz Offensive; Battle of the Dukla Pass; Budapest offensive Siege of Budapest; Operation Konrad III; Operation Spring Awakening; Vienna offensive
- Decorations: Order of the Red Banner (2nd Formation)
- Battle honours: Zhmerynka; Budapest (both 2nd Formation)

Commanders
- Notable commanders: Maj. Gen. Vasilii Ivanovich Neretin; Col. Anatolii Vasilevich Grigorev; Col. Vladimir Pavlovich Kolesnikov; Col. Andronik Sarkisovich Sarkisyan; Maj. Gen. Denis Protasovich Podshivailov

The 151st Rifle Division was originally formed as an infantry division of the Red Army on September 9, 1939, in the Kharkov Military District, based on the shtat (table of organization and equipment) of September 1939. At the outbreak of the war, it was still in this district, attempting to build up to wartime strength as part of the 67th Rifle Corps. It was immediately ordered to move west and concentrate with its Corps in the Gomel region and by July 2 it was assigned to 21st Army in Western Front, although it was briefly detached to 13th Army. On July 23 it joined Central Front with the 21st Army, after which it became encircled near Gomel and forced to break out at a heavy cost in casualties and equipment. The remnants were moved east to join Bryansk Front, but by mid-September it was clear that local resources were not available to rebuild it, and the division was disbanded to provide replacements for other units in the Front.

A new 151st was formed just over a month later in Azerbaijan as part of the Transcaucasian Military District, based on a reserve rifle regiment. After spending the first seven months of 1942 forming up and then guarding the Turkish border as part of 45th Army, it was ordered north as German forces pressed east in their summer offensive. By mid-August it was in the 9th Army of the Transcaucasus Front, defending along the Terek River against elements of the 1st Panzer Army. In September it was transferred to 37th Army in the same Front and was holding along the same line in late October when 1st Panzer launched its last desperate effort to reach Ordzhonikidze. One regiment was effectively overrun, and the 151st had to be withdrawn into Front reserves for rebuilding. It returned to the front lines in early December, being assigned to 44th Army in North Caucasus Front during January 1943 as it took part in the pursuit of 1st Panzer toward Rostov-on-Don; in early February the division was transferred with its Army to Southern Front. After Rostov was recaptured that month, the division advanced to the Mius River line where it remained into August. After an initial attempt to break this line failed in July, a renewed offensive in August finally succeeded, and the front began an advance toward the lower Dnieper and Crimea, during which the 151st was transferred to the 2nd Guards Army. After a series of moves to the northwest, including a period in the Reserve of the Supreme High Command, it ended up in 38th Army of 1st Ukrainian Front and took part in the March 1944 offensive to the west, during which it won a battle honor. During the Lvov-Sandomierz offensive in July–August it was part of 1st Guards Army, which played a secondary role, after which it was moved, with this Army, back to 4th Ukrainian (formerly Southern) Front. This Front was tasked with breaking through the Carpathian Mountains toward Hungary, and the 151st was serving with 18th Army when it was awarded the Order of the Red Banner for its part in taking Uzhhorod. As it advanced south into Hungary, it was transferred to the 7th Guards Army of 2nd Ukrainian Front. It was under these commands as it advanced on Budapest and helped to establish the siege of the city, but during the German efforts to relieve the garrison it was moved again, now to 4th Guards Army in 3rd Ukrainian Front; it would remain in this Front for the duration. When Budapest was taken on February 13, 1945, the 151st was awarded its name as a second battle honor. Prior to the last German offensive in Hungary in March, it was transferred to 26th Army and, once this was defeated, joined the general advance into Austria, where it ended the war. It would be disbanded in July.

== 1st Formation ==
The 151st began forming on September 9, 1939, at Kirovograd in the Kharkov Military District, based on a cadre from the 41st Rifle Division. On October 12 it joined the 7th Rifle Corps in the just-formed Odessa Military District. In May 1940 it returned to command of the Kharkov District. As of April 5, 1941, in common with the other divisions of the District, it was at staffing level No. 4/120, with an official strength of 5,864 personnel. In May large drafts of newly mobilized men began arriving to bring the division closer to full strength, but at the outbreak of the war it had only increased to about 9,000. It was located at Lubny, assigned to 67th Rifle Corps, which was a separate corps of the Supreme Command Reserve and also contained the 102nd and 132nd Rifle Divisions. At this time its order of battle was as follows:

- 553rd Rifle Regiment
- 581st Rifle Regiment
- 626th Rifle Regiment
- 353rd Artillery Regiment
- 464th Howitzer Artillery Regiment
- 262nd Antitank Battalion
- 366th Antiaircraft Battalion
- 145th Reconnaissance Battalion
- 197th Sapper Battalion
- 218th Signal Battalion
- 228th Medical/Sanitation Battalion
- 32nd Chemical Defense (Anti-gas) Platoon
- 10th Motor Transport Battalion
- 140th Field Bakery
- 251st Field Postal Station
- 336th Field Office of the State Bank

Kombrig Vasilii Ivanovich Neretin had been appointed to command on September 15, 1939, and would lead the division throughout its first formation. His rank would be modernized to major general on June 5, 1940. In October 1940 Col. Sergei Fyodorovich Skliarov became deputy commander; this officer had previously led the 139th Rifle Division. From December 9, the division's political section would be led by Commissar Arsenii Ivanovich Karamyshev, and in the same month Col. Georgii Gregorovich Voronin took the position of chief of staff. At 1800 hours on June 22, this headquarters staff received orders from the 67th Corps commander, Kombrig F. F. Zhmachenko, to begin loading for transport to the front. On July 1 it was concentrating with the rest of its Corps north of Gomel, coming under command of 21st Army in the Group of Reserve Armies. It became officially active the next day as part of Western Front.

=== Battles in Belarus ===
By July 7 the 151st and 132nd Divisions had taken up a line from Rechytsa to Gomel to Dobrush to Loyew. At this time 21st Army was under command of Lt. Gen. V. F. Gerasimenko and Western Front, as well as Western Direction, was in the hands of Marshal S. K. Timoshenko. At some time after July 10 the 151st was reassigned to 13th Army, which was penetrated to a depth of 20 km on July 12 by 2nd Panzer Group. On July 14 Timoshenko, after sending a long and accurate assessment of the state of his command to the STAVKA, also issued orders for extensive counterattacks which were beyond the capability of his largely depleted forces. 13th Army was to:

... liquidate the enemy penetration in the Staryi Bykhov region on 16 July... and firmly hold on to your positions along the Dnepr River. I am assigning the decisive attack to 13th Army's units as the most important mission and a matter of honor.

Before this could be carried out, the 151st returned to 67th Corps in 21st Army, which was now led by Col. Gen. F. I. Kuznetsov. At 0241 hours on July 13, this officer had ordered his Army to launch an attack to retake Babruysk and Parychy while also destroying the spearhead of 2nd Panzer. 67th Corps (now with 102nd, 151st and 187th Rifle Divisions) was to cover the Army's left wing on a line from Novy Bykhaw to Zimnitsa against attack from the north, then attack toward Shapchitsy, Komarichi, and Bykhaw to "cut the enemy tanks off from their infantry."

When the attack went in the Corps was reinforced with 300 tanks of the newly arrived 25th Mechanized Corps, but despite this its attacks south of Bykhaw were largely futile. 66th Rifle Corps, after crossing the Dniepr, made considerably more progress toward Babruysk against the XII Army Corps of German 2nd Army, striking as deep as 80 km. 21st Army's counterattacks were threatening enough that Army Group Center was compelled to commit its XXXXIII Army Corps from reserve, diverting it from the fighting around Smolensk.

At 2000 hours on July 16 Timoshenko reported on the general situation facing Western Front. He stated that 21st Army was continuing to attack toward Babruysk against small groups of withdrawing German tanks. The 151st and 102nd had forced a crossing of the Dniepr and reached the railroad from Rahachow to Bykhaw Station, but otherwise the position of 67th Corps was unknown. A concentration of German infantry was reported in the Falevichy area with infantry columns moving along the road from Babruysk to Rahachow. A further report at 2000 hours on July 18 stated that the Corps was protecting the Army's right (north) flank, and as of 0800 hours on July 21 the Corps was stated as defending its previous positions west of Propoisk, but that a regiment of German infantry had attacked at the boundary of the 151st and 187th and captured the northeast outskirts of Obidovichy before being halted by the 50th Tank Division. At 1730 hours on July 22 Kuznetsov was again ordered to defeat the German Babruysk-Bykhaw grouping, which by now had been significantly reinforced. 67th Corps was to continue to defend the line from Prudok to Dobryi Dub to Dubrovskii before regrouping to attack northward and help destroy the Bykhaw grouping, another unrealistic objective.

On July 23 a new Central Front was formed out of 3rd, 13th, and 21st Armies plus 25th Mechanized. The Front was under command of General Kuznetsov and 21st Army was now led by Lt. Gen. M. G. Yefremov. 67th Corps now consisted of the 102nd, 151st, and 155th Rifle Divisions. To this point the division had fared fairly well in regard to equipment losses. Colonel Voronin reported on this date that it still had almost 100 percent of its artillery, with 12 120mm mortars, 18 76mm regimental guns, 16 76mm cannon, 32 122mm howitzers, and eight 152mm howitzers, therefore short only four of the latter. The fighting that day was summarized at 2000 hours, with the 151st reported as defending 29–36 km southwest of Propoisk while also retaking the southwest outskirts of Lazarovichy and Koromka in cooperation with the 102nd. At this time the division was facing the 1st Cavalry Division. By now all three army corps of 2nd Army had arrived in the Babruysk–Rahachow–Propoisk area and the forces of 21st Army west of the Dniepr were threatened with complete destruction.

=== Defense of Gomel ===
Through this entire period the 21st Army had its headquarters at Gomel. By the end of the first week of August the 2nd Panzer Group was placed to push southward across the Sozh River as part of a combined operation with 2nd Army into the Gomel and Rahachow regions. This was in response to Hitler's Directive No. 34 of July 30; anticipating this, Stalin had made command changes on August 7, sending Kuznetsov to the Crimea, putting Yefremov in command of Central Front, and making his former chief of staff, Lt. Gen. V. M. Gordov, the new commander of 21st Army. The German thrust began just after dawn on August 8 when the 3rd and 4th Panzer Divisions of XXIV Motorized Corps crossed the Sozh between Roslavl and Krychaw, accompanied by VII Army Corps on its left flank and 10th Motorized Division in the rear. This attack easily broke the thin defense on the right wing and center of 13th Army, leading to several days of heavy fighting in which the 13th was largely destroyed.

After dealing with the 13th by late on August 12 the XXIV Motorized reassembled east of Krychaw to continue its drive to the south. By now, 2nd Army had joined the offensive, pushing south across the Sozh toward Gomel with eight divisions of XII and XIII Army Corps. Army Group Center's commander, Field Marshal F. von Bock, had considered the capture of the city essential since the start of 21st Army's counterattacks the previous month. Despite finally being pulled back over the Dniepr, the pincer move by 2nd Army and XXIV Panzer had encircled the bulk of 63rd and 67th Rifle Corps, a total of some six rifle divisions including the 151st, in a pocket on the east bank of the river northwest of Gomel. The trapped formations made repeated efforts to break out toward the city, forcing 2nd Army to commit all of XII and LIII Army Corps to contain and destroy them. During August 17–18 the trapped men either surrendered or escaped in small groups.

==== In Bryansk Front ====
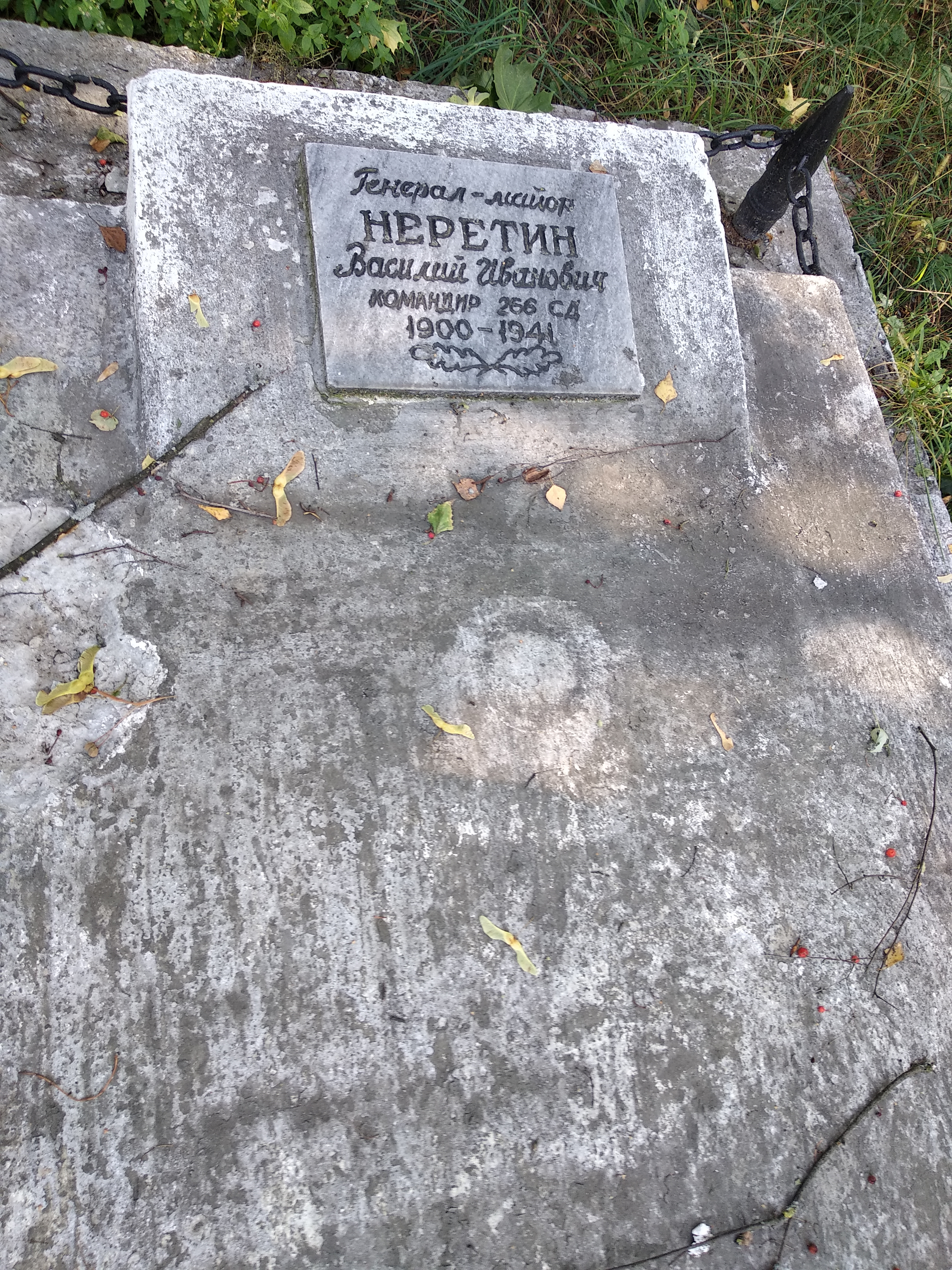
Grave marker of General Neretin

Bryansk Front had been formed on August 14, under command of Lt. Gen. A. I. Yeryomenko. The STAVKA was planning a general counteroffensive by Western and Reserve Fronts to begin on August 30-September 1, and Yeryomenko was ordered to support this with a general offensive of his own. The 151st was in no position to take part in this as it had been withdrawn into the Front reserves for rebuilding; although it had not lost its battle flags or combat documents and its staff was still largely intact, its losses in manpower and equipment had been very large. On August 20 General Neretin had been given command of the 266th Rifle Division while retaining his position in what remained of the 151st. In early September the 2nd Panzer Group began moving past Bryansk Front to begin the encirclement of Southwestern Front east of Kyiv. The encircling pincers met on September 14, and under the circumstances there was no possibility of rebuilding the division, and on September 16 it was disbanded to provide replacements for other units of Bryansk Front. Neretin had already been killed in action on August 30 while leading units of the 266th, and was buried near Snovsk.

== 2nd Formation ==
A new 151st Rifle Division began forming on October 23, 1941, at Ucar, Azerbaijan, in the Transcaucasian Military District, on the basis of the 166th Reserve Rifle Regiment. Its order of battle had several differences from that of the 1st formation:

- 581st Rifle Regiment
- 626th Rifle Regiment
- 683rd Rifle Regiment
- 353rd Artillery Regiment
- 262nd Antitank Battalion
- 145th Reconnaissance Company
- 197th Sapper Battalion (later 570th)
- 218th Signal Battalion (later 629th and 328th Companies)
- 228th Medical/Sanitation Battalion
- 32nd Chemical Defense (Anti-gas) Platoon
- 40th Motor Transport Company (later 40th Battalion)
- 23rd Field Bakery
- 98th Divisional Veterinary Hospital
- 251st Field Postal Station (later 1724th)
- 336th Field Office of the State Bank

Once formed, some 60-75 percent of the division's personnel were natives of the Caucasus region. Col. Anatolii Vasilevich Grigorev was assigned to command on the day it began forming. By the start of 1942 it was in the reserves of Caucasus Front, but during January it was assigned to 45th Army, back in Transcaucasian District. The 151st remained under these commands into August, guarding the border with Turkey, until it was ordered north as German forces pushed east through the Caucasus Steppe. It joined the active army on August 6, and ten days later Colonel Grigorev was replaced by Col. Vladimir Pavlovich Kolesnikov.

== Battle of the Caucasus ==
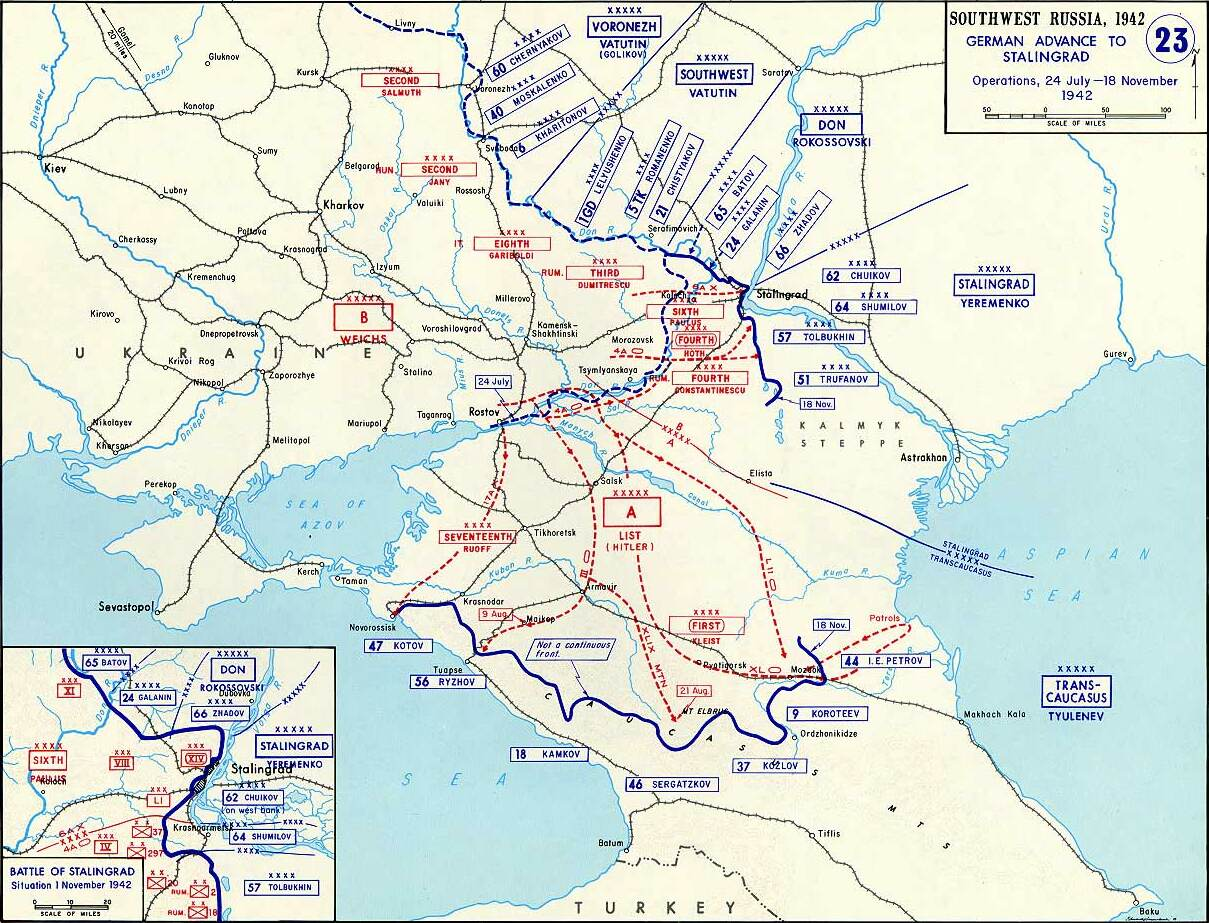
Battle of the Caucasus, July - November 1942. Note locations of Terek River and 9th Army.

At this time 45th Army was under command of Lt. Gen. F. N. Remezov. The STAVKA had ordered Transcaucasus Front to hold the line of the Terek River, guarding the oil refineries at Grozny, the shores of the Caspian Sea at Makhachkala, and the Caucasus Mountains in general, largely with 44th Army, but also with whatever else was available from 45th and 46th Armies. On August 13 the Front's daily combat diary stated:

... By 12 August 10th and 9th Rifle Brigades, 389th Rifle Division, 11th Guards Rifle Corps, 151st Rifle Division, and 392nd Rifle Division were already defending here [along the lower course of the Terek].

Shortly after this the division was transferred to 9th Army, in the Northern Group of Forces of Transcaucasus Front.

On August 16 the 3rd and 23rd Panzer Divisions of XXXX Panzer Corps began moving south from the area of Piatigorsk and Mineralnye Vody. At this time 9th Army was under command of Maj. Gen. V. N. Martsinkevich and the 151st was positioned in its first echelon, which was along the Terek from Prokhladny eastward past Mozdok. The 3rd Panzer reached the northern bank of the Terek in the Mozdok region late on August 23 and captured the city two days later. After a week of confused fighting the 1st Panzer Army soon came to a virtual standstill and the Soviet defenses began reorganizing. General Martsinkevich was replaced but the forces of 9th Army continued to hold the south bank of the Terek, apart from two German-controlled bridgeheads.

=== Battles along the Terek ===
By the beginning of September the 9th Army had added the 417th Rifle Division and 62nd Naval Rifle Brigade and was continuing to defend the Terek from south of Prokhladny eastward to south of Mozdok to just northwest of Grozny. It was tasked with preventing the German LII Army Corps and 13th Panzer Division from crossing the river and advancing on Ordzhonikidze. LII Corps began its attack at 0200 hours on September 2, attempting to thrust across the Terek against the positions of 11th Guards Corps. In two days of see-saw fighting the German force, backed by tanks of the 23rd Panzer Division, managed to secure a bridgehead nearly 3 km deep. On September 6 a mixed battlegroup from the two panzer divisions with about 40 tanks drove a deep wedge between the 9th and 8th Guards Rifle Brigades, but as it approached the northern foothills of the Terek Mountains it encountered intense artillery, Katyusha, and antitank fire as well as heavy counterattacks by Soviet forces, bringing them to a temporary halt.

1st Panzer Army's commander, Gen. E. von Kleist, received orders from Hitler to continue his preparations for further offensive action. He formed Battlegroup Liebenstein, based on 3rd Panzer, with motorized infantry and roughly 70 tanks, and concentrated it in the bridgehead held by 370th Infantry Division at Kizliar. Before this could begin the commander of the Northern Group, Lt. Gen. I. I. Maslennikov, ordered a counterattack on September 10 by 10th Guards Rifle Corps to restore 9th Army's line along the Terek. This forced most of Liebenstein's battlegroup back across the river but did not prevent the 370th Infantry and Battlegroup Crisolli, with nearly 100 tanks, from driving south the next day. By the end of September 14 this force had reached the Alkhan-Churt River 30 km south of Mozdok and completely shattered the 11th Guards Corps. It was not brought to a halt until the 151st was committed in a blocking role. The division had recently been transferred to 37th Army of the same Front.

Later in September Maslennikov began planning a new effort to push Kleist's forces back over the Terek. In so doing he lost sight of Kleist's own offensive preparations, focusing on the Mozdok sector and neglecting the Nalchik axis. On September 25 the III Panzer Corps captured several small bridgeheads over the upper Terek near Maiskii, with only the weakened 151st available to defend the sector. This was a failure on the parts of both Maslennikov and 37th Army's commander, Maj. Gen. P. M. Kozlov. Both men were also confused through the early part of October by several preliminary moves by Kleist, and overall Transcaucasus Front was overly optimistic about the situation it faced. On October 19 Colonel Kolesnikov left the division, and was replaced by Col. Andronik Sarkisovich Sarkisyan.

=== Ordzhonikidze Operation ===
As early as October 14 Kleist had directed III Panzer Corps to produce a plan to drive on Ordzhonikidze via Nalchik. Meanwhile, Maslennikov was planning an offensive of his own, mainly under control of 9th Army. This was approved by the STAVKA late on October 25, 18 hours following the start of Kleist's own push. At this time the 37th Army was defending along the Baksan and Terek Rivers with six divisions, including the 151st, facing the Romanian 2nd Mountain Division and the 23rd and 13th Panzer Divisions plus the 370th Infantry. Overall, the Soviet forces facing III Panzer were superior in manpower but significantly outnumbered in tanks; 37th Army, its main target, had no tanks at all.

The offensive began at dawn on October 25 with a powerful artillery and air preparation which, among other damage, struck Kozlov's headquarters at Dolinskoe, killing many staff officers, destroying the communications system, and forcing a move to the south. 2nd Mountain struck the boundary between 392nd and 295th Rifle Divisions at 1000 hours, and soon penetrated to a depth of 8 km. At about the same time the two panzer divisions attacked from bridgeheads on the west bank of the upper Terek and shattered the defenses of the 626th Rifle Regiment, plus two regiments of the 295th, and began a pursuit which gained 20 km by day's end, with 13th Panzer reaching a point 15 km east of Nalchik. Maslennikov misinterpreted this as simply an effort to eliminate 37th Army's salient west of the upper Terek instead of a much more ambitious effort to outflank Ordzhonikidze from the west. In order to prevent any further disaster, Transcaucasus Front dispatched a rifle brigade, a division, and a corps as reinforcements. The 151st had been pulled back into Front reserves by the start of November.

III Panzer Corps maintained its rapid advance on October 27–28, which completed the rout of 37th Army. Nalchik was taken on the latter date, while Leksen was seized by Battlegroup Crisolli. Altogether a 20 km-wide gap had been driven through the 37th, and on October 29 1st Panzer Army ordered the 13th and 23rd Panzer to wheel east to cross the Urukh River en route to Ordzhonikidze. This began at dawn on October 31 and broke through the left flank of 10th Rifle Corps. After bitter fighting through October 31-November 1 which destroyed as many as 32 German tanks the remnants of 10th Corps pulled back to new defenses 30 km northeast of the city. The two panzer divisions continued to push on November 3–4, but forces of Transcaucasus Front continued to hold south of the Terek, and the German position was precarious. The next day 13th Panzer was fully halted on the western outskirts, and counterattacks on November 6 led to most of it being encircled. The battles to free it would continue until after November 13, when the Northern Group went over to a general counteroffensive.

== Advance on Rostov ==
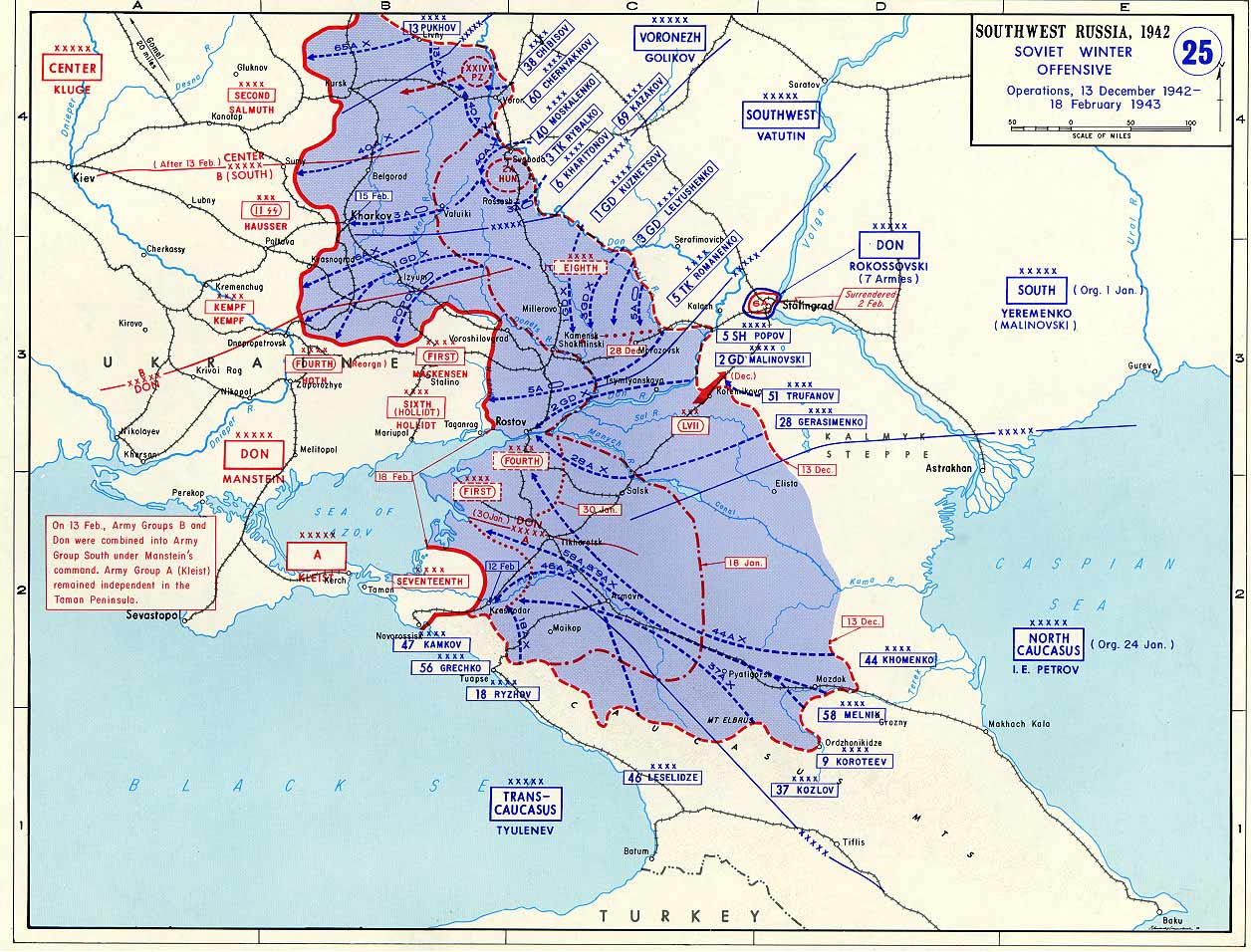
Red Army advance, December 1942 - February 1943. Note path of 44th Army.

As of December 9, the 151st was part of 44th Army and was facing the extreme left wing of 1st Panzer Army, alongside the 110th Cavalry Division. As the panzers began their general withdrawal that day the two divisions took up positions screening the long right flank of the Northern Group. The 44th's initial objective was the recapture of Mozdok, but during December 12–16 its main forces only managed to advance 10–12 km. During this period the 151st was back under direct command of the Northern Group of Forces. By December 27 the city was still in German hands, and General Maslennikov issued orders which included the following:

151st RD, with its existing reinforcements, will attack on the morning of 29 December with the immediate mission to capture Naiko, Bogdanov, and Kirov by day's end on 2 January and subsequently reach the Bogdanov, Nadezhda, and Pervomaiskii line while protecting the shock group's right wing from the north.

In the event these plans were shelved due to a scathing report to the STAVKA on the Northern Group's recent operations, which Maslennikov attributed to the "poor quality of the troops", especially the Azerbaijanis, a conclusion which the report rejected. He was ordered to transfer four divisions from 44th to 58th Army and add the 151st to the former. This and other regroupings postponed the planned offensive into the new year.

On January 5, 1943, the 44th Army, which was under command of Maj. Gen. V. A. Khomenko, consisted of the 151st, 271st, 347th Rifle Divisions, and 416th Rifle Divisions, with assorted supporting units, and was directed to continue the pursuit of the German forces in the direction of Soldatsko-Aleksandrovskoye and Sadovoye, while also eliminating remaining garrisons east of the Kuma River and capturing Otkaznoye and Novo-Zavedenskoye by January 7. Maslennikov was still facing criticism for slowness and on January 8 he issued new orders to, in part, bring the 151st to a line from the Sukhopadinskii Canal to Erastov. The next day the division reached the Gorkaya Balka region, roughly 20 km east-northeast of Soldatsko-Aleksandrovskoye and on January 10 passed through Otkaznoye, with the forward detachment reaching Svoboda. The right wing of the Northern Group had now reached the line ordered for it on January 5, but 2–3 days behind schedule.

Maslennikov now ordered 44th Army to follow a cavalry-mechanized group commanded by Lt. Gen. N. Ya. Kirichenko in the direction of Sablinskoe and Sadovoye. By 1400 hours on January 11 the 151st was 1 km south of Mokryi Karamyk, which is 36 km northeast of Mineralnye Vody. Despite the complaints about slowness from the STAVKA, in fact Tank Group Filippov broke into that place by surprise from the east, placing all of 1st Panzer Army in that area in a crisis. However, the cavalry-mechanized group had not reached the German rear. The next day the Northern Group attempted to accelerate in order to reach Stavropol, which was still some 100 km distant, and during the day the division was reported as having reached Sablinskoe with its main forces while its forward detachment was 14 km farther on to the northwest. On January 13 it took positions 4 km southeast of Aleksandrovskoe and was fighting for that place alongside units of the cavalry-mechanized group. The report of Maslennikov's headquarters stated: "151st RD, after repelling three counterattacks by 9, 11, and 27 tanks against its left wing, surrounded Aleksandrovskoe with a dense ring, and prepared to attack on the morning of 14 January." This place was being defended by 3rd Panzer Division. That day's attack succeeded in taking Sadovoye after repelling a counterattack, but Aleksandrovskoe continued to hold.

3rd Panzer was forced to withdraw on January 15 and the Northern Group was now ordered to change its axis of advance to the northwest. Sarkisyan's men mounted a pursuit in that direction the next day, attempting to reach Sergievka and Bazovaya Balka. 3rd Panzer was attempting to build a defense along the Kalaus River. On January 17 a severe blizzard moved in, adding difficulties for both sides; the division managed to move to Sergievka, where it concentrated the next day. Transcaucasus Front now expected 44th Army to reach Donskoe and Tuguluk by January 21, Zhukovskaya and Krasnaya Polyana by January 27, and Yegorlyk by February 1. During January 19 the 151st reached Dubovka, 26 km northeast of Stavropol.

As of January 20 the 151st had a combat strength of 4,931 personnel, about average of the Army's five divisions. The next day saw Stavropol taken by the 347th Division, with the 151st and 271st concentrating in the Bezopasnoe area, some 65 km to the north. The northern movement by the two divisions gained another 20 km on January 22. The next day the 151st split from the 271st to march to the Zhukovka region. On the same day the Northern Group was redesignated as North Caucasus Front. The pursuit by North Caucasus and Southern Fronts restarted on January 25 after a short lull. 44th Army was reported as continuing to move its main forces to a line from Peschanokopskoye to Belaya Glina; the 151st had taken Kuleshovka and Novo-Pavlovka, while its forward detachment was "conducting fierce fighting for Novo-Pokrovskaya."

The immediate aim was to encircle and destroy the 5th SS Panzergrenadierdivision "Wiking", if not all of LVII Panzer Corps, either during the pursuit or by cutting off their escape via Rostov. North Caucasus Front's advance was being led by Kirichenko's cavalry-mechanized group with 44th Army following. On January 26 the 151st was reported as having concentrated its main forces at Novo-Pokrovskaya while its forward detachment continued to advance ahead. By now the 3rd Panzer Division was arriving to assist the right wing of 5th SS. At the end of the following day the Army was reported as being in pursuit of 3rd Panzer and the 111th Infantry Division northwest and south of Belaya Glina, with the 151st and 347th Divisions operating at Kalnibolotskaya (32 km west of Belaya Glina) against 3rd Panzer's 394th Panzergrenadier Regiment. On the same day Hitler authorized most of 1st Panzer Army to withdraw north through Rostov, which effectively ended the attempt to trap and destroy it south of the Don River.

In a report on January 28 the strength of the division is given as 4,100 personnel, 6,400 short of establishment, with just 45-50 percent of its establishment transport. North Caucasus Front stated overnight on the 28th/29th that the 44th Army had overcome strong resistance from 3rd Panzer and the 151st was fighting 3 km east of Nezamaevskaya. The next day a counterattack was launched by 11th Panzer Division south of Mechetinskaya, and threw 44th Army on the defensive, with the 151st still fighting in its previous positions although part of its forces were in the northwest outskirts of Kalnibolotskaya. Despite this success 11th Panzer had only about 15 tanks, so was unable to exploit it. During January 30 it continued to hold while also attempting to take Nezamaevskaya, but this effort was defeated by German artillery. The next day it continued to envelop this objective from the north while it captured Ploskii and Veselyi on the Eya River with part of its forces. A sudden thaw set in on January 31, then a flash freeze overnight which thwarted the advance on Rostov for the time being.

February 2 saw the start of Operation Star by Bryansk, Voronezh and Southwestern Fronts, which was planned to reach the Donbas region. The commander of Army Group Don, Field Marshal E. von Manstein, had no choice but to pull all the remaining panzer forces south of Rostov to the north as a countermeasure. This left the 151st and 416th facing two weak security divisions. The 271st caught up with Kirichenko's forces on the same day, followed by most of the rest of 44th Army on February 3. By 1600 hours the 151st had one regiment in Alekseevka, another in Tsukurovka Balka, and the third in Krasnyi, all of which were some 15–20 km south of Novo-Bataysk. General Khomenko now decided to press on to that objective with the 151st covering the right flank. The following day the division attacked from the latter two places toward Kugei. Over the day the Army lost 300 men killed or wounded and 80 frozen; there was also an acute shortage of fuel and ammunition and just 1.3 days' supply of food. LVII Panzer Corps was able to pull back from its line south of the Don without significant damage.

=== Capture of Rostov ===
During February 5 the 44th and 28th Armies, with Kirichenko's group, did their best to exploit the withdrawal of 5th SS. The 151st "overcame enemy resistance to reach the Burkhanovskii, Budenovskii, and Molod'va line [15-30km southwest of Novo-Bataysk] and captured these points." The next day Bataysk, the suburb of Rostov south of the Don, was liberated by 28th Army, which captured 50 fully loaded trains, and 44th Army, along with the cavalry-mechanized group, was transferred to Southern Front in accordance with STAVKA Directive No. 30037 of February 4. The division was pulled back to the Army's second echelon at Azov on February 7. Southern Front planned to begin a general offensive at 0200 hours on February 8, and the two Armies were detailed to soften up the defenses of Rostov itself and points west. To this end, 44th Army attacked into the frozen delta of the Don west of the city. Kirichenko's Tank Group Titov had roughly 25 operational vehicles, nearly all of which were light T-60s and T-70s, able to cross the ice. The 151st followed the 347th with directions to enter battle on its left and then strike for Rogozhkino to take Siniavka on the north bank of the Mertvy Donets. In confused fighting in the predawn and daylight the division had to overcome German rearguards and move through continual air attacks to reach Polushkin and Lagutnik Farm. The 320th Rifle Division attempted to come to its assistance but was hampered by the same resistance from the air.

The 151st was halted on February 9 in the Siniavka area by strong resistance from two battalions of the 454th Security Division backed by two mortar batteries. The 271st Division was forced to withdraw from its bridgehead over the Mertvy Donets by German counterattacks. By now all the divisions of 44th Army were reduced to 3,000-4,000 personnel each, of which some 1,500-2,000 were "bayonets" (riflemen and sappers). The German forces were similarly weak. During February 10 the 151st again attacked toward Siniavka and Morzhanovka, with little success. General Khomenko appealed to Southern Front for air support to restore his advance, and on February 12 officially went over to the defense. Ammunition, fuel, manpower, and even food, were all so short that further attacks were out of the question. The division took up positions at Nedvigovka and Morskoy Chulek with two regiments and Lagutnik Farm with the other.

Despite this stalemate it was clear to all that a German withdrawal was forthcoming. Overnight on February 13/14 units of 28th Army were involved in heavy fighting within Rostov before going over to a general offensive which soon cleared the city. The 151st and 320th, covered by the 271st on the right flank, attacked again at Siniavka and Nedvigovka without any success. By February 15 the division was fighting with just 500 active "bayonets". The next day the Front's 5th Shock Army reached the Mius River during its pursuit, beginning fighting for Matveyev Kurgan at midnight. The next day the division was still running into stiff resistance some 2 km east of Morskoi Chulek. This place, 30 km southeast of Pokrovskoye, was taken on February 17, as the advance to the Mius continued, but in the Army's report at 2200 hours, the division's losses were given as 112 men killed or wounded, while claiming 57 killed and 176 wounded from the German forces. It was also reported as being completely out of ammunition.

== Into Ukraine ==
Due to mutual exhaustion the front settled along the Mius, which had extensive German fortifications built in early 1942, for the coming months. Colonel Sarkisyan left the 151st on March 10 and was succeeded by Col. Aleksandr Nikolaevich Burikin until the 23rd, when Maj. Gen. Denis Protasovich Podshivailov took over. This officer had led the 97th Rifle Division for three months the previous year before being sent to the Voroshilov Academy for a five-month courses, after which he took command of the 49th Guards Rifle Division. Apart from three days in the coming October he would lead the division for the duration of the war.

The front of Army Group South (First Panzer Army and the reconstituted 6th Army) stretched for 240 km along the Donets River and then followed the Mius-Front for another 160 km to Taganrog Bay and was faced by Southern and most of Southwestern Fronts. The latter held several small bridgeheads on the south bank of the Donets. With the failure of the German offensive at Kursk in July it was obvious that a Soviet counteroffensive would follow. By the start of July the 44th Army had been expanded to a total of seven rifle divisions, with a pair of Guards tank brigades and significant artillery in support. It was still under command of General Khomenko and was located on Southern Front's left flank, from the Sea of Azov and along the Mius. The two Fronts began an offensive on the morning of July 17, with 28th and 44th Armies striking the Mius line in the Golodayevka area. The Soviet forces quickly scored sizeable breakthroughs in an effort to secure the Donbas, but were unable to expand their breaches due to the intervention of panzer reserves. By the end of the month the offensive had lost its momentum and 6th Army was soon able to restore most of its front.

=== Advance to the Dniepr ===
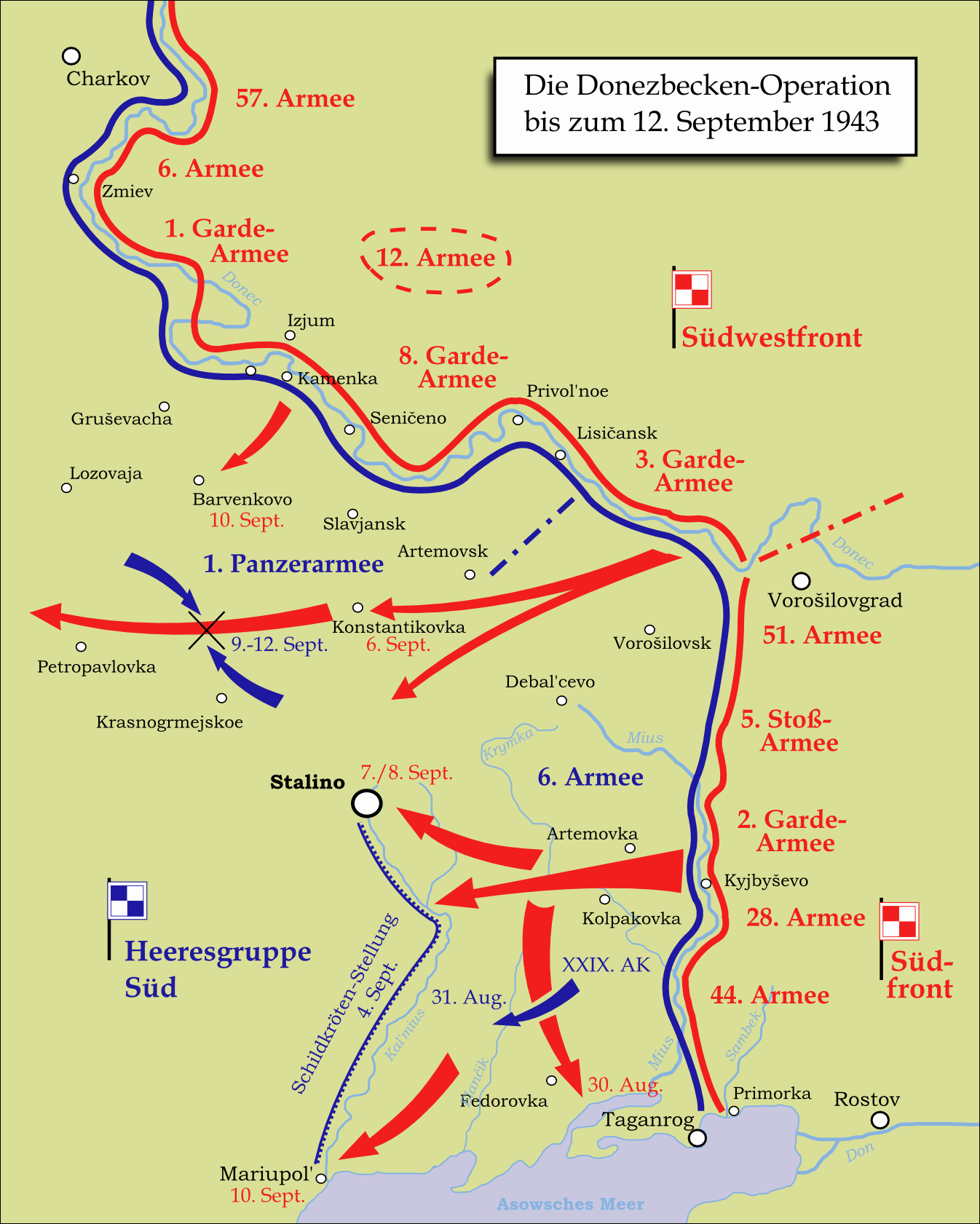
Donbas Offensive, August 1943

With the failure of the July offensive much of 44th Army's strength was shifted north. Southern Front began its new offensive on August 18, attacking in much the same area but now with 2nd Guards and 5th Shock Armies making up the weight of the force. It began with an overwhelming concentration of artillery fire and before the end of the day the spearheads of 5th Shock had penetrated up to 7 km through a 3 km-wide gap. 6th Army had no tanks at all, and although von Manstein secured the weak 13th Panzer on August 20, it was unable to close the gap when it attacked on August 23. On August 27 the 2nd Guards Mechanized Corps turned south out of the breakthrough area and began a dash to the coast behind the German XXIX Army Corps. On the 29th the 2nd Guards reached the sea west of Taganrog and the German corps was pocketed between it and the 28th and 44th Armies. The next day 13th Panzer opened a narrow gap in the line and the 9,000 men of XXIX Corps were able to escape during the night with few losses. On August 31 Hitler authorized a withdrawal to the Kalmius River. By this time the 151st had been reassigned to 2nd Guards Army, still in Southern Front.

Through September and well into October Southern Front (as of October 20 4th Ukrainian Front) made slow progress against 6th Army from the Dniepr to the Sea of Azov with orders to destroy the German Melitopol grouping, seize crossings over the Dniepr and then shut the German 17th Army into the Crimea. The offensive made little progress until October 9 but by October 23, led by forces of the 51st Army, the Front finally ground its way into the city. On the last day of the month the 151st was removed to the Front reserves, and after a brief period on the active front from November 6 to December 1 it returned to the reserves, now as part of 67th Rifle Corps.

=== Proskurov-Chernivtsi Offensive ===
At the turn of the new year the division was still in 67th Corps, part of 69th Army, in the Reserve of the Supreme High Command, but when it rejoined the fighting on January 13, it was assigned, with its Corps, to 38th Army of 1st Ukrainian Front. By the end of January the lines between 1st Ukrainian Front and 1st Panzer Army had stabilized north of Vinnytsia. The offensive was renewed on March 4. 38th Army was on the left (south) flank of the Front and its initial objective was Vinnytsia, after which it was to continue to advance southwest toward Zhmerynka, which had been designated as a Festung (fortress) by Hitler. The latter was captured on March 20 and the division was awarded a battle honor:

ZHMERINKA... 151st Rifle Division (Maj. Gen. Podshivailov, Denis Protasovich)... The troops who participated in the liberation of Zhmerinka, by the order of the Supreme High Command of March 20, 1944, and a commendation in Moscow, are given a salute of 12 artillery salvoes from 124 guns.

By the start of April 67th Corps had been expanded to four rifle divisions.

=== Lvov–Sandomierz Offensive ===
During June the division was moved to the 18th Guards Rifle Corps of 1st Guards Army, still in 1st Ukrainian Front. In the regrouping that preceded the offensive the Front command decided to widen the sectors held by the 1st Guards and 13th Armies in order to concentrate several other armies on attack sectors. 1st Guards took over the entire sector held by 38th Army and part of that held by 60th Army. When the offensive began on July 13 the 1st Guards Army was deployed on a 118 km-wide sector with 12 rifle divisions, of which five were in reserve. The Army was assigned a supporting role in the offensive, prepared to back up 38th Army to its north with its reserve divisions and the 4th Guards Tank Corps once that Army penetrated the German front. From July 14–20 the Front's northern armies successfully penetrated the deep German defenses on the Rava-Ruska and Lviv axes and with all available German reserves committed or already destroyed the Front prepared to expand the offensive on the direction of Drohobych. 1st Guards and 18th Armies had been fighting local actions during this first week in order to pin German forces in place.

1st Guards Army went over to the general offensive on the morning of July 21 and after dislodging the rearguards advanced from 6–22 km during the day. The Army's commander, Col. Gen. A. A. Grechko, was now ordered to develop an aggressive offensive and capture Stanislav by the end of July 24. From July 24–26 the Army continued to advance against stubborn resistance and took Stanislav on the 27th. In recognition of its part in this victory the 626th Rifle Regiment would be awarded the Order of the Red Banner on August 10. During that month the 1st Guards Army, along with 18th Guards Corps, was assigned to 4th Ukrainian Front, which was preparing to enter the Carpathian Mountains.

== Into the Carpathians ==
This Front had been transferred from the Crimea following the liberation of Sevastopol to the foothills of the Carpathians in part because many of its formations, having fought in the Caucasus, were experienced in mountain warfare. The 151st had such experience. 18th Guards Corps at the start of September had the 151st, 161st, and 237th Rifle Divisions under command.

Beginning on September 9 the Front attempted to break through the positions of First Panzer Army into the Dukla Pass in the Laborec Highlands toward Uzhhorod. As the offensive developed the division, with its Corps, was shifted to 18th Army, in the same Front. Only slow progress was made to begin with, but by the start of October the attack began to make headway, in part due to the removal of a panzer division, and on October 6 the pass was taken. By October 14 the Front was on the move again, slowly advancing south of Dukla Pass through German fortified positions; 18th Army was attempting to force some of the smaller passes farther east. Uzhhorod was taken on October 27, and in recognition of its part in this fighting, on November 14 the 151st would be decorated with the Order of the Red Banner.

== Into the Balkans ==
In November, as the Red Army advanced on Budapest, the division was transferred to the 30th Rifle Corps of 7th Guards Army in 2nd Ukrainian Front. On November 26 this Corps was ordered to begin moving overnight on a route from Mezőkövesd to Jászberény via Heves in order to concentrate in the Tóalmás area by the morning on November 29. The Army was to break through the defense of the Axis Hatvan grouping with six divisions in first echelon and two more in second along a front from Heves to Aszód before developing the offensive in the direction of Verseg and Csővár in order to create conditions for the commitment of the 6th Guards Tank Army and the Pliyev Cavalry-Mechanized Group. By the end of the third day it was to reach the Danube with its left flank. The Army faced seven divisions of the German 6th and Hungarian 3rd Armies.

At 1015 hours on December 5, after brief but powerful artillery preparation, the 7th Guards, along with 53rd and 46th Armies, attacked and quickly broke through, advancing up to 8 km and widening the breakthrough frontage to up to 18 km. 46th Army, directly opposite Budapest and operating from the south to outflank the city to the west, had already begun forcing the Danube overnight. The breakthrough was so effective that 6th Guards Tanks was committed within hours, and fighting continued through the night. During December 8, 6th Guards Tanks and elements of 7th Guards were jointly attacking from the Vác area south along the river, with the aim of capturing Dunakeszi. The next day the Axis Budapest grouping was completely encircled from the east and north.

=== Siege of Budapest ===
At 1700 hours on December 18 the Front commander, Marshal Malinovskii, refined the assignments he had given to his armies three days earlier. Among these, the 30th Rifle Corps, along with Romanian 7th Army Corps and 18th Guards Rifle Corps, were to attack on the morning of December 20 to seize Budapest. This effort was unsuccessful, and as of January 1, 1945 the 151st was holding the line northeast of Pest. On January 20 the 30th Corps was transferred to Army Gen. F. I. Tolbukhin's 3rd Ukrainian Front without the division, which instead entered the 104th Rifle Corps of 4th Guards Army in the same Front. It would remain in this Corps into the postwar. Operation Konrad III had begun two days earlier and 30th Corps was sent as reinforcements, while 104th Corps was one of those tasked with maintaining the siege, moving to the west bank of the Danube on January 24.

Tolbukhin now decided to use 104th Corps and 23rd Tank Corps to make a counterblow from the north to meet part of 4th Guards Army from the region northeast of Lake Velence, both with the objective of reaching Sárosd and destroy the German salient that had been driven to the Danube. At this time the 151st, in common with the other divisions of the Corps, had 4,800-4,900 personnel on strength, while the 23rd had just 67 operational tanks and self-propelled guns plus 2,600 men in its motorized rifle brigade. The division was deployed along a line from Ufalu to Erdomajor to Tárnok. The counteroffensive began at 1000 hours on January 27 with most of 23rd Tanks and part of 104th Corps driving in the direction of Vereb and Pettend. In spite of heavy resistance, including artillery, mortar, and tank fire, the two Corps were successful in taking the largest part of the former as well as all of the latter. While the German penetration was not eliminated, by the end of the day the IV SS Panzer Corps was ordering its tanks to fall back from Vereb to a new defense line. Fighting continued through the night.

The next morning the 104th and 23rd Tanks took up jumping-off positions near Pettend on a sector from Rajszentpeter to Height 101 and attacked at 1300 hours after a short fire onslaught and soon began a decisive advance to the south. On January 29 the Tanks pushed on to take Sárosd, with the 151st plus an artillery regiment, a mortar battalion and a Guards mortar battalion. A breakthrough was made on a 3 km-wide front and 23rd Tanks advanced up to 2 km by 1500. By the end of the day the 135th and 39th Tank Brigades had captured Aggszentpeter, although the 151st had fallen behind, coming under fire from bypassed German groups, and was held up northeast of Anna. Meanwhile, the remainder of 104th Corps managed an advance of only about 3–4 km.

January 30 saw the two Corps resume their offensive. The Aggszentpeter area saw the heaviest fighting, while elements of 3rd SS Panzer Division "Totenkopf" were encircled and eliminated near Anna and Janos, while 23rd Tanks advanced a further 6 km. On February 2 the two Corps reached as far as southwest of Adony and Pusztaszabolcs, linking up with 26th Army. This effectively wiped out the German gains made during Konrad III. Budapest finally fell on February 13, and the 151st received its name as its second battle honor.

=== Vienna Offensive ===
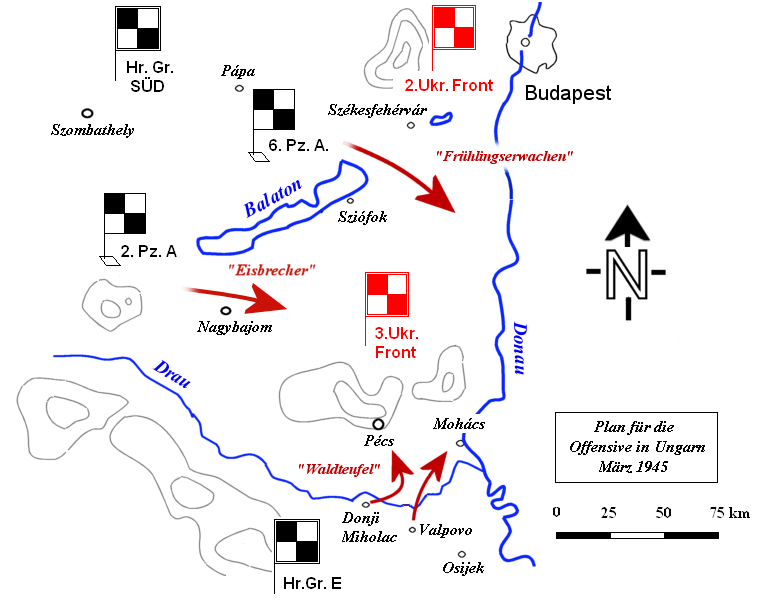
Operation Spring Awakening

The last oil fields remaining in German hands were at Nagykanizsa in southwestern Hungary, and on February 25 Hitler approved the plans for a new offensive to create a buffer zone between them and the Soviet forces near Budapest. The STAVKA, having watched the German buildup for weeks, decided to give him the first move, similar to what they had done at Kursk in 1943. Tolbukhin set up a two-echelon defense, with 26th, 57th, 4th Guards, and 1st Bulgarian Armies in first. 26th Army was expected to take the brunt of the blow and occupied well-prepared defenses. The offensive began at midnight on March 5, although II SS Panzer Corps, east of the Sárvíz Canal, was delayed by 24 hours. During March 7–8 the I SS Panzer Corps overran several defense lines on the west side of the Sárvíz, gaining some 30 km, and two days later reached the Sio Canal, taking two small bridgeheads overnight. However, the Soviet troops were very well dug-in, and II SS Panzer had advanced only 8 km by March 12. The next day 3rd Ukrainian counterattacked on both sides of the Sárvíz, and "Spring Awakening" was effectively over.

The Soviet counteroffensive began in the afternoon of March 16. Tolbukhin intended to finish off 6th SS Panzer Army by trapping it east of Lake Balaton, but during March 21–22 it managed to slip free, largely due to delays by 6th Guards Tanks. The next day his Front's forces took Veszprém, and 26th Army was ordered to advance on Szombathely. By March 25 the 2nd and 3rd Ukrainian Fronts had completed breaking through the main German defense, and the commander of 6th Army, Gen. G. O. H. Balck, reported that morale was dropping. Two days later the main forces of 3rd Ukrainian closed on the Rába River and on March 30 the 6th Guards Tanks crossed the Austrian border. Vienna was taken on April 13 and the campaign gradually came to a halt.

== Postwar ==
The division ended the war with the full title of 151st Rifle, Zhmerynka-Budapest, Order of the Red Banner Division. According to STAVKA Order No. 11098 of May 29, 1945, which created the Southern Group of Forces, the 151st is listed as one of the rifle divisions to be "disbanded in place", which took place in July. General Podshivalov was soon moved to command of the 86th Guards Rifle Division until March 1947, when he became deputy commander of the 360th Rifle Division. In February 1950 he began a 16-month course at the Frunze Military Academy, after which he entered the educational establishment. He would retire at the end of 1955 and died on May 25, 1962.
