= 277th Rifle Division =

Soviet infantry division

- Active: July – November 1941 (1st formation); December 1941 – 1955 (2nd formation)
- Country: Soviet Union
- Branch: Red Army
- Type: Rifle division
- Engagements: World War II
- Decorations: Order of the Red Banner (2nd formation); Order of Suvorov, 2nd class (2nd formation); Order of Kutuzov, 2nd class (2nd formation)
- Battle honours: Roslavl (2nd formation)

Commanders
- Notable commanders: Viktor Chernov

The 277th Rifle Division (Russian: 277-я стрелковая дивизия) was an infantry division of the Soviet Union's Red Army and later the Soviet Army, formed twice.

First formed in the summer of 1941, the division was destroyed in the Battle of Kiev during September of that year. Reformed in December 1941, the division fought in the Battle of Stalingrad, Operation Bagration, the Vistula–Oder Offensive, and the Soviet invasion of Manchuria. Serving in the Soviet Far East postwar, the division was renumbered in 1955.

== History ==
=== First Formation ===
The 277th began forming on 10 July 1941 at Dmitriyev, part of the Orel Military District. Its basic order of battle included the 850th, 852nd, and the 854th Rifle Regiments, as well as the 846th Artillery Regiment. The division was sent into combat while still incomplete and was transferred to the 21st Army's 67th Rifle Corps in the Bryansk Front (later the Central Front) while missing most of its heavy weapons and trucks in early August. The 277th held positions on the southern flank of the German 2nd Panzer Group. When the group attacked south and encircled most of the Central Front and the Southwestern Front in the Kiev pocket, the division was among the units trapped and destroyed. The 277th was officially disbanded on 1 November.

=== Second Formation ===
The division was reformed on 25 December from the 468th Rifle Division, stationed at Frolovo in the Stalingrad Military District. The 468th had been formed there on 14 December. Its basic order of battle was the same as the first formation. The division remained near Stalingrad, finishing its formation, until March 1942, when it became part of the Reserve of the Supreme High Command's (RVGK) 28th Army in the same area. A month later, the 277th was sent to the front as part of the Southwestern Front's 38th Army. After the Soviet defeat at the Second Battle of Kharkov in May and the beginning of Case Blue, the German summer offensive, in June, the 38th Army was disbanded as a result of losses and the 277th was assigned to the 21st Army. By the end of August the division, worn down by the previous months of fighting against the German advance, was withdrawn to the RVGK's 10th Reserve Army. In October the division returned to the 21st Army, with which it fought in Operation Uranus, which encircled German troops in Stalingrad, in November. In January 1943, the division fought in Operation Ring, which eliminated the pocket.

The 277th was withdrawn to the RVGK in late January and moved north to the Western Front reserves, where it became part of the 50th Army in March. In April the division was moved to the 49th Army. At the end of the year, the division became part of the 5th Army's 72nd Rifle Corps, with which it remained for the rest of the war. The division fought in Operation Bagration, advancing into the Baltic states, and was fighting at Vilkaviškis on 13 August. Its attacks were led by the 360-strong 234th Penal Company. From January 1945, the 277th fought in the Vistula–Oder Offensive, for which it was reinforced with the 213th Guards Howitzer Regiment, equipped with 24 122 mm howitzers, the 11th and 12th Mortar Regiments with 36 120mm mortars each, and the 208th Guards Light Artillery Regiment with 24 76 mm guns. Despite its artillery support, the division had been reduced to only 2,723 men by 12 March.

In April, the 5th Army was withdrawn from the front and became part of the RVGK, beginning its move to the Far East in preparation for the Soviet invasion of Manchuria during the summer. During the invasion of Manchuria from 8 August to 3 September, the 277th was part of the army's 72nd Rifle Corps. Postwar, the division was stationed at Iman with the 5th Army. In 1955, it was renumbered as the 47th Rifle Division.
