= 102nd Rifle Division =

Infantry division of the Red Army

- Active: 1941–1947
- Country: Soviet Union
- Branch: Red Army / Soviet Army
- Type: Infantry
- Size: Division
- Engagements: World War II; Battle of Kursk; Operation Kutuzov; Operation Bagration; East Prussian Offensive; East Pomeranian Offensive

The 102nd Rifle Division was an infantry division of the Red Army which participated in the Second World War. It was formed three times. Its first formation was listed as part of the active army from 2 July to 19 September 1941. Its third formation was awarded the Order of Lenin, the Order of the Red Banner, and the Order of Suvorov, 2nd class.

== History ==
The division was formed in the summer of 1939 at Kachinskoye in the Siberian Military District. In March 1940, the 67th Rifle Corps was formed in the Kharkov Military District. The corps consisted of the 102nd, 132nd, and 151st Rifle Divisions, the 194th Separate Sapper Battalion and 207th Separate Communications Battalion. Corps headquarters was stationed in Poltava.

In June 1941, the 102nd Rifle Division received 5,450 more personnel.

On 22 June 1941, the division was stationed in Kremenchug. It was ordered on June 28 to march to Chernigov. On 1 August 1941, BSSA lists the division as part of the 67th Rifle Corps, 21st Army, part of the Bryansk Front. In August, the division was surrounded and destroyed in the Gomel area.

The division was recreated at Chimkent in the Central Asian Military District in January 1942. James Goff writes that the new division was reformed from the briefly active 462nd Rifle Division, which was only active from 22 December 1941 to 1 February 1942 before being re-designated the 102nd Rifle Division (Second Formation).

The division was again reformed from Far East NKVD Division at Khabarovsk in June 1942 and joined the 70th Army. It fought at the Battle of Kursk, Operation Kutuzov, Operation Bagration, the East Prussian Offensive, and the East Pomeranian Offensive. It was with the 48th Army of the 3rd Belorussian Front in May 1945.

Postwar, it became the 9th Separate Rifle Brigade at Armavir with the 29th Rifle Corps. The brigade disbanded in March 1947.

== Commanders ==
- Colonel Porfiry Martynovych Hutz (1 July 1940 – 17 July 1941)
- Colonel Spiridon Chernyugov (18 July – 19 September 1941)
- Major General Andrey Matveyevich Andreyev (25 November 1942 – 5 December 1943)
- Major General Sergey Senchilo (6 December 1943 – 29 January 1944)
- Colonel Markian Pogrebnyak (30 January 1944 – 9 May 1945)

== Sources ==
- Feskov, V.I.; Golikov, V.I.; Kalashnikov, K.A.; Slugin, S.A. (2013). Вооруженные силы СССР после Второй Мировой войны: от Красной Армии к Советской [The Armed Forces of the USSR after World War II: From the Red Army to the Soviet: Part 1 Land Forces] (in Russian). Tomsk: Scientific and Technical Literature Publishing. ISBN 9785895035306.
