= 350th Rifle Division =

350th Rifle Division (August, 1941 – May, 1946)
- Postwar photo of Maj. Gen. G. I. Vekhin, Hero of the Soviet Union
- Active: 1941–1946
- Country: Soviet Union
- Branch: Red Army
- Type: Division
- Role: Infantry
- Engagements: Battle of Moscow; Third Battle of Kharkov; Donbass Strategic Offensive (August 1943); Battle of the Dniepr; Battle of Kiev (1943); Lvov–Sandomierz Offensive; Vistula-Oder Offensive; Lower Silesian Offensive; Battle of the Oder–Neisse; Battle of Berlin
- Decorations: Order of the Red Banner; Order of Bogdan Khmelnitsky
- Battle honours: Zhitomir; Sandomierz

Commanders
- Notable commanders: Col. Pyotr Petrovich Avdeenko; Maj. Gen. Aleksandr Pavlovich Gritzenko; Maj. Gen. Grigorii Ivanovich Vekhin

The 350th Rifle Division formed in late August, 1941, as a standard Red Army rifle division, at Atkarsk. It went to the front in November, and served south of Moscow throughout the winter and as late as August, 1942, after which it made a bewildering number of reassignments over the next six months. Badly battered by the German "backhand blow" near Kharkov in February, 1943, the division was pulled back into reserve for rebuilding for several months, then fought the summer campaign under command of 12th Army. In November the 350th was honored for its role in the liberation of Zhitomir and received that city's name as an honorific. At this time it was in 1st Guards Army of 1st Ukrainian Front, and it would remain in that Front for the duration of the war. On August 18, 1944, the division received an unusual second honorific for helping to liberate the Polish city of Sandomierz. It ended the war in western Berlin with a distinguished record of service, but was disbanded in May, 1946.

== Formation ==
The division began forming in late August at Atkarsk in the Volga Military District. The exact date is uncertain, but it received its first commanding officer, Col. Pyotr Petrovich Avdeenko, on September 1. Its primary order of battle was as follows:

- 1176th Rifle Regiment
- 1178th Rifle Regiment
- 1180th Rifle Regiment
- 917th Artillery Regiment

As of November 1 the division was still in Volga Military District, but one month later it was in the newly-formed 61st Army in the Reserve of the Supreme High Command. It went to the fighting front that month when 61st Army was assigned to the re-forming Bryansk Front, and it remained in that Army until August, 1942, in either Bryansk or Western Front. In August it was briefly in the reserves of Western Front, then in September was moved to 1st Reserve Army in the Reserve of the Supreme High Command back in the Volga Military District before returning to the front in November, joining 6th Army of the Voronezh Front. The division was assigned to the 15th Rifle Corps before 6th Army was shifted to Southwestern Front in late December.

=== Third Battle of Kharkov ===
In mid-February, 1943, in the wake of their victory at Stalingrad, Red Army forces in the southern sector of the front were advancing with ease while their opponents were trying to get a grip on the situation. The commander of Southwestern Front, Gen. N.F. Vatutin, proposed a plan to the STAVKA on February 17 that would take his forces all the way to the Dniepr River:

"...1. The 6th Army: a. Attack towards the west with the forces of the 15th Rifle Corps (the 350th, 172nd and 6th Rifle Divisions), the 267th Rifle Division, and the 106th Rifle Brigade and, since Kharkov has been taken by our forces, capture the Krasnograd, Poltava and Kremenchug regions... by 23 February 1943 and conduct observation along the northern bank of the Dniepr River..."

Within 48 hours, Vatutin's optimism had turned to alarm as the German counterstroke began to bite into his forces:

"...6th Army continued to conduct intense offensive fighting with enemy infantry and tanks on 20 February 1943, while repelling repeated counterattacks by his motor-mechanized units... The army's units were fighting along the [following] lines by day's end: The 350th Rifle Division - Riabukhino and eastern outskirts of Melikhovka..."

Two days later, 15th Corps was doing its best to hold its positions which were under attack by the 1st SS Panzer Division. This proved to be an unequal struggle, and by February 28 the division had been driven northwards into the sector of the 3rd Tank Army south of Kharkov, along with the rest of 15th Corps. By the time the German offensive shut down, the 350th was in tatters. From December, 1942, until March 1, 1943, it had received 6,920 replacements, but on March 17 it had only 2,557 men in the field against an authorized strength of 10,594. Despite this weakness, it remained at the front.

On March 20, Colonel Avdeenko was replaced in command by Maj. Gen. M. I. Glukhov, but he held the post for less than two weeks before being replaced by Col. Aleksandr Pavlovich Gritzenko. This officer would be promoted to Major General on October 14, and remained in command until August 19, 1943, apart from a brief break in March/April of that year. As of April 1 the division was directly under command of Southwestern Front while it rebuilt, no longer in 15th Corps, and later that month it was reassigned to 12th Army in the same Front. It would remain in this Army until September, briefly in both the 66th and 67th Rifle Corps. On August 20, General Gritzenko handed command over to Col. A. N. Korusevich, but that officer was replaced two weeks later by Maj. Gen. Grigorii Ivanovich Vekhin. Vekhin would remain in command for the duration of the war and, in fact, until May, 1946.

== Advance in Ukraine ==
In September, the 350th was once more removed to the Reserve of the Supreme High Command, where it was assigned in October to the 94th Rifle Corps in 58th Army, but that Corps was transferred to 1st Guards Army in the first days of November. When the Ukrainian city of Zhitomir was first liberated on November 12, the division was serving in that Army, and was recognized for its efforts with the following citation:

"ZHITOMIR...350th Rifle Division (Maj. Gen. Vekhin, Grigorii Ivanovich)...By order of the Supreme High Command of 1 January 1944 and a commendation in Moscow, the troops who participated in the battles for the liberation of Zhitomir are given a salute of 20 artillery salvoes from 224 guns.

1st Guards Army was in 1st Ukrainian Front at this time, and the division would remain in this Front for the duration.

In January, 1944, the 350th left both 94th Corps and 1st Guards Army to become an independent division in its Front. In February it was briefly assigned to the 102nd Rifle Corps, before being placed in the 24th Rifle Corps of 13th Army in March. It would remain in that Army, and in that Corps (with one brief reassignment), until the last weeks of the war. On March 23 the 350th was honored for its role in the liberation of Kremenets with the Order of Bogdan Khmelnitski, 2nd Degree.

During the Lvov–Sandomierz Offensive on July 15 the division quickly broke through the German defenses in the direction of Rava-Ruska and crossed the Western Bug and San rivers on July 23, liberating the Polish town of Leżajsk. On July 29 the forward detachment of the 350th reached the Vistula and forced it, helping to create a bridgehead 10 km wide and 8 km deep, and fending off enemy counterattacks to retake it. For all this it received the Order of the Red Banner on August 9 for its successful drive in the direction of Lvov. Finally, the division received further recognition for its role in the liberation of the Polish city of Sandomierz on August 18, 1944, as cited:

"SANDOMIR...350th Rifle Division (Maj. Gen. Vekhin, Grigorii Ivanovich)...By order of the Supreme High Command of 18 August 1944 and a commendation in Moscow, the troops who participated in the battles for the liberation of Sandomir are given a salute of 20 artillery salvoes from 224 guns.

The 917th Artillery Regiment was also awarded this battle honor, while the 1178th Rifle Regiment was decorated with the Order of Bogdan Khmelnitski, 2nd Degree, on September 1.

== Into Germany ==
By the end of the advance though Poland 13th Army had reached the Oder River along the entire front from Keben to Malcz, forced the river with the assistance of 4th Tank Army and captured a bridgehead west of Keben and Steinau up to 16 km deep and 30 km wide, as well as a smaller one on the left flank. As of January 28 the 24th Corps was in the Army's second echelon on the east bank of the Oder northeast of Wolau.

1st Ukrainian Front carried out a substantial regrouping from January 29 to February 7 during which the total frontage held by 13th Army was reduced from 86 km to just 18 km. 24th Corps, consisting of the 350th, 395th and 147th Rifle Divisions, was in the first echelon with the 102nd Rifle Corps. All six divisions of the two corps were in first echelon with two rifle regiments up and one in reserve, and their sectors averaged 3 km in width. The offensive began at 0930 hours on February 8, following a 50-minute artillery preparation. 102nd Corps quickly crushed the first German position and advanced up to 8 km by day's end. 24th Corps, on the other hand, faced two heavily fortified villages on its right flank and a large woods stretching well to the west. The attacks on the villages were stymied, even with the backing of the 61st Tank Brigade. However the Corps' left flank division took advantage of the success of 52nd Army's attack to its left, advanced 4 km and reached Oberau. Jointly these advances put the two Armies in good position to outflank and possibly encircle the Hermann Göring Panzer Division, which was defending the large woods.

On February 9 the 24th Corps advanced up to 15 km, reaching Kotzenau with part of its forces while the remainder deployed facing north, blocking passage to the south by the now-surrounded German panzer troops. The next day the main body of 13th Army advanced in the wake of 4th Tank Army, with the objective of forcing the Bober River. On the 11th the Front's shock group faced stiffening German resistance while 24th Corps spent the entire day fighting with rearguards which were covering the main forces' retreat to the Bober. By the end of the day the main shock group had advanced up to 60 km and had expanded the width of the breakthrough to 160 km, reaching the Bober along a number of sectors. The Corps spent most of February 12 and 13 battling for the town of Sprottau before reaching the Bober in the Sagan area, encountering powerful resistance from German infantry and armor in the eastern part of the town while also forcing a crossing of the river to its north. For their roles in this fighting, on April 5 the 1178th Rifle Regiment would be awarded the Order of Aleksandr Nevski, while the 1176th and 1180th Rifle Regiments and the 917th Artillery Regiment would each receive the Order of the Red Star.

Infantry and up to 20 tanks of the Großdeutschland Panzer Corps attacked the bridgehead north of Sagan on February 14. This was countered with the assistance of the 63rd Tank Brigade of 10th Tank Corps and the German force went over to the defensive. Over the next two days the 24th Corps fought to secure Sagan, finally forcing a crossing of the Bober in the center of the town on the 16th, and then cleared its western sector. This success threatened to outflank Großdeutschland and allowed 27th Rifle Corps to expand the main bridgehead. By February 19 the final attempts of the German forces to hold along the Bober crumbled, and what remained of them began retreating to the Neisse River. By February 24 the 13th Army had closed up to the line of that river, and soon went over to the defensive.

=== Battle of Berlin ===
In April the division left 24th Corps and 13th Army to again serve as a separate division in 1st Ukrainian Front. During the Battle of Berlin the division was in 27th Rifle Corps, still in 13th Army. On April 19, 27th Corps was developing its offensive to the west and the 350th was in the center of the line; having beaten off a number of counterattacks it turned its front to the southwest and south and by day's end had advanced 8 – 14 km and reached the line Petershain - Stradow. On the following day the division, along with the 280th Rifle Division and the 24th Rifle Corps, engaged the German Spremberg group of forces, by the end of the day enveloping that group from the north. By order of the Front command on April 23 the division was attached to the 4th Guards Tank Army and was dispatched by auto transport through Luckenwalde to the Potsdam area. The next day two brigades of the 10th Guards Tank Corps, supported by the 350th, made an unsuccessful attempt to force the Teltow Canal in the Stahnsdorf area, and were then transferred to the Teltow area, crossing overnight on bridges laid down by 3rd Guards Tank Army. By the 27th the German Potsdam group of forces had been eliminated. From April 28 to May 1 the division saw its last combat as it helped to break the German resistance on Wannsee island.

== Postwar ==
The 350th ended the war with the full title of 350th Rifle, Zhitomir-Sandomir, Order of the Red Banner, Order of Bogdan Khmelnitsky Division. [Russian: 350-я стрелковая Житомирско-Сандомирская Краснознамённая ордена Богдана Хмельницкого дивизия.] Postwar, the division briefly remained in southeastern Germany, before moving to Ovruch in northern Ukraine back with 13th Army's 27th Rifle Corps. It was disbanded there in 1946, possibly in May, when General Vekhin transferred to command of the 280th Rifle Division.
