= Spiridon Chernyugov =

Soviet Army major general (1900–1960)

Spiridon Sergeyevich Chernyugov
- Born: 27 December 1900; Goryunkovo, Mignovichskoy volost, Krasninsky Uyezd, Smolensk Governorate, Russian Empire
- Died: 1 November 1960 (aged 59) Moscow, Soviet Union
- Allegiance: Russian SFSR; Soviet Union
- Branch: Red Guards; Red Army (later Soviet Army)
- Service years: 1917–1918; 1918–1951
- Rank: Major general
- Commands: 117th Rifle Division; 102nd Rifle Division; 47th Rifle Division; 8th Guards Rifle Division
- Conflicts: Russian Civil War; World War II
- Awards: Order of Lenin; Order of the Red Banner (2); Order of the Patriotic War, 1st class; Order of the Red Star

Spiridon Sergeyevich Chernyugov (Russian: Спиридон Сергеевич Чернюгов; 27 December 1900 – 1 November 1960) was a Soviet Army major general.

Chernyugov joined the Red Guards in late 1917 and transferred to the Red Army in early 1918, serving as an orderly and later as a Red Army man during the Russian Civil War. He became a junior commander after the end of the war upon graduation from command courses, serving in staff positions during the late 1930s. He became commander of the 117th Rifle Division as the Red Army expanded before Operation Barbarossa, leading it and later the 102nd Rifle Division during the Battle of Smolensk. Wounded, upon recovery, Chernyugov became commander of a rifle brigade that he continued to command when it became the 47th Rifle Division. He led the 8th Guards Rifle Division from late 1942 until a severe wounding during the Leningrad–Novgorod Offensive in early 1944. After months of treatment, Chernyugov was given command of infantry courses for the rest of the war. Postwar, he briefly commanded a rifle brigade and held DOSARM positions before retiring in 1951.

== Early life and Russian Civil War ==
Chernyugov was born on 27 December 1901 in the village of Goryunkovo, Mignovichskoy volost, Krasninsky Uyezd, Smolensk Governorate. During the Russian Civil War, in October 1917, he joined the Red Guards and was sent to the 291st Reserve Field Hospital, where he worked as a messenger and orderly. In May 1918, Chernyugov voluntarily transferred to the Red Army, being assigned to the 26th Rifle Division as a combatant orderly. He served as a Red Army man in the 232nd Rifle Regiment of the division from late 1919, fighting on the Eastern Front near Zlatoust and Kurgan against the White army led by Alexander Kolchak. Chernyugov fell seriously ill with typhus, and was evacuated to a hospital in Nizhny Novgorod, going on sick leave between February and July 1920. After his recovery, Chernyugov was assigned to the 16th Rifle Regiment in Dorogobuzh, and in August 1920 sent to study at the 18th Infantry Command Courses in Kaluga, participating in the suppression of the Tambov Rebellion as part of a student detachment between March and November 1921.

== Interwar period ==
After graduating from the courses in April 1922, Chernyugov was seconded as a platoon commander at the disposal of the assistant commander-in-chief for Siberia, becoming a student at the 1st School of the Forces of Special Purpose (ChON) in Omsk. Upon graduation in December 1923, he served as a platoon commander and acting company commander in the 523rd Ossetia and 522nd Vladikavkaz Special Purpose Battalions. After the disbandment of the ChON, Chernyugov was transferred to become a platoon commander in the regimental school of the 28th Rifle Division at Grozny. He simultaneously studied at the commanders' refresher courses at the Vladikavkaz Infantry School between August 1925 and graduation in September 1927. During this period, Chernyugov participated in the disarmament of anti-Soviet guerrillas in Chechnya between August and September 1925 and in the Khasavyurtovsky District of Dagestan between September and October 1926.

After graduation from the courses, he was posted to the 133rd Bessarabia Rifle Regiment of the 45th Rifle Division of the Ukrainian Military District at Kyiv, where he served as a platoon commander in the regimental school, assistant commander and commander of a company, and acting head of the regimental school. He studied at the Frunze Military Academy between March 1931 and May 1934, then was appointed assistant head of the 1st (operational) staff department in the 70th Rifle Division of the Volga Military District at Kuybyshev. From January 1935, he served as chief of staff of the 210th Rifle Regiment of the division, and in April 1936 became assistant head of the reconnaissance department of the district headquarters. Chernyugov transferred to the 53rd Rifle Division of the district in January 1937 to become head of its 1st staff unit, and from March 1938 commanded the 158th Rifle Regiment of the division. He became commander of the 117th Rifle Division, forming at Kuybyshev, on 13 August 1939. During June 1941 the division became part of the 21st Army, forming in the district.

== World War II ==
When Operation Barbarossa, the German invasion of the Soviet Union, began on 22 June, the division was part of the 66th Rifle Corps of the army, which was part of the Reserve of the High Command although located in the Volga Military District. It was quickly transferred to the 63rd Rifle Corps, with which it was sent to the Western Front between 26 June and 2 July to fight in the Battle of Smolensk. Chernyugov was relieved of command on 18 July, for what the military council of the front described on 1 August as "poor leadership of combat operations" and "lack of command and control". The same report noted that between 5 and 7 July, during battles near Zhlobin, Chernyugov's poor leadership resulted in the loss of half of the infantry and artillery of the division, accusing him of abandoning his unit and crossing the Dnieper to the rear. Upon further investigation, these allegations were not confirmed, and he was appointed commander of the 102nd Rifle Division of the army. Chernyugov briefly led the 102nd before he was wounded on 15 August and evacuated to hospitals in Oryol and then Kuybyshev.

Appointed commander of the 21st Separate Rifle Brigade, forming in the Volga Military District, in early November, Chernyugov led the brigade as it was sent to the Western Front near Naro-Fominsk. The brigade became part of the 4th Shock Army in late December, and during January and February 1942 fought in the Toropets–Kholm Offensive, advancing on the right flank of the army. During the offensive, the brigade reached its assigned objectives and went over to the defensive after capturing Usvyaty, 30 kilometers northwest of Velizh. After the brigade was expanded into the 47th Rifle Division in July, Chernyugov continued in command until his transfer to command the 8th Guards Rifle Division on 1 October, being promoted to major general on 14 October.

He led the division as part of the 2nd Guards Rifle Corps of the 3rd Shock Army, fighting in the Velikiye Luki and Nevel Offensives, recapturing Velikiye Luki, Nevel, and Novosokolniki. The division fought in the Leningrad–Novgorod Offensive as part of the 22nd Army of the 2nd Baltic Front from January 1944. Severely wounded on 28 February and evacuated to a hospital in Moscow, Chernyugov spent several months in the Arkhangelskoye sanatorium near Moscow and was treated in Yessentuki and Kuybyshev. Upon recovery in July, he was appointed head of the Moscow Infantry Officer Improvement Courses, remaining in this position for the rest of the war.

== Postwar ==
After the end of the war, Chernyugov continued to command the courses. He was appointed head of the 4th department of the Rifle Forces Combat Training Directorate in April 1946, and in June 1947 became commander of the 36th Separate Rifle Brigade of the Ural Military District. He was replaced in this position in February 1949 and placed at disposal of the Ground Forces Personnel Directorate, and then the Central Council of the All-Union DOSARM (later merged to become DOSAAF). From April 1949 he was chairman of the republic DOSARM committee of the Kazakh Soviet Socialist Republic. Chernyugov was again placed at the disposal of the Soviet Army Personnel Directorate in May 1951 and retired. He died in Moscow on 1 November 1960.

== Awards and decorations ==
Chernyugov was a recipient of the following awards and decorations:

Order of Lenin (21 February 1945)
Order of the Red Banner, three times (30 January 1943, 3 November 1944, 6 November 1947)
Order of the Patriotic War, 1st class
Order of the Red Star
Medal "For the Defence of Moscow" (1944)
Medal "For the Victory over Germany in the Great Patriotic War 1941–1945" (1945)
Jubilee Medal "XX Years of the Workers' and Peasants' Red Army" (1938)
Jubilee Medal "30 Years of the Soviet Army and Navy" (1948)
Order of the Red Banner (Mongolia)

- Two Honorary Weapons (a silver dagger and Mauser)
