= 277th Division =

277th Division may refer to:

- 277th Infantry Division, Wehrmacht, Germany
- 277th Rifle Division, Soviet Union

== See also ==
- List of military divisions by number
