= 47th Rifle Division =

47th Mountain Rifle Division (1940–1942) 47th Rifle Division
- Active: I Formation: 1922–1942 II Formation: 1942–1946 III Formation: 1955–1956
- Country: Soviet Union
- Branch: Red Army
- Type: Infantry
- Size: Division
- Engagements: World War II: Second Battle of Kharkov; Nevel Offensive
- Decorations: Order of the Red Banner (1st and 3rd formations) Order of Lenin (2nd formation); Order of Suvorov 2nd class (2nd & 3rd formations) Order of Kutuzov 2nd class (3rd formation)
- Battle honours: Roslavl (3rd formation) Nevel (2nd formation) On behalf of Comrade Stalin (1st formation)

Commanders
- Notable commanders: Viktor Georgyevich Chernov; Grigory Chernov

The 47th Rifle Division was an infantry division of the Red Army. It was first formed in 1922 as the Georgian Rifle Division. In 1924, it became the 1st Georgian Mountain Division. The division became the 47th Georgian Mountain Rifle Division in 1936 and dropped the designation "Georgian" in 1940. It was disbanded in June 1942 after being wiped out at Izyum. In July 1942, the 47th Rifle Division was formed from the 21st Rifle Brigade. It fought in the Nevel Offensive, for which it was awarded the title "Nevel". The division was disbanded in the Baltic Military District in 1946. It was also awarded the Order of Lenin and the Order of Suvorov 2nd class. The division was reformed a third time from the 277th Rifle Division in 1955 but disbanded in July 1956.

== History ==
In 1922, the Georgian Rifle Division was formed. It was given the honorific "on behalf of Comrade Stalin" on 29 July 1930. In July 1936, it was renamed the 47th Georgian Mountain Rifle Division. On 16 July 1940, it became the 47th Mountain Rifle Division. On 22 June 1941, it was part of the 3rd Rifle Corps in Batum. Between 11 and 14 September, the division was sent by rail from Kupyansk to Sloviansk. On 20 September it was again transported to Iskrivka, Vodyanaya and Kovyahy. It was sent into battle near Chutovo on 26 September to participate in the attack on Poltava. As a result of a disorganized retreat, it lost 23 artillery guns and 7 mortars in October 1941. As part of the 6th Army, it fought in the Second Battle of Kharkov and was wiped out in the Izyum pocket during May 1942. It was officially disbanded on 30 June.

The 47th Rifle Division was reformed in July 1942 from the 21st Rifle Brigade. The division fought in the Nevel Offensive in October 1943 as part of the 83rd Rifle Corps. On 7 October it was awarded the honorific "Nevel" for its actions in the capture of Nevel. The division was advancing towards Zheludok, Ovinische and Lobok on 8 November. It was awarded the Order of Suvorov 2nd class on 21 December. The division was awarded the Order of Lenin on 10 July 1944. In 1946, the division was disbanded in the Baltic Military District.

In 1955, the division was reformed from the 277th Rifle Division at Iman with the 5th Red Banner Army. It inherited the honorifics "Roslavl Red Banner Order of Suvorov and Kutuzov". The division disbanded on 25 July 1956.

== Commanders ==
The division was commanded by the following officers.

- S. Levktadze (1922–1935)
- Leonid Mikhailovich Agaladze (1935–1937)
- Captain Dzhabahidze (1937)
- Timofey Ustinovich Grinchenko (8 October 1938 – 1 October 1941)
- Viktor Georgiyevich Chernov (2 October 1941 – 16 April 1942)
- Filipp Matykin (17 April 1942 – 25 May 1942)
- Colonel Spiridon Chernyugov (20 July 1942 – 13 October 1942)
- Colonel Grigory Chernov (14 October 1942 – 8 January 1944)
- Colonel Alexander Paramonov (9 January 1944 – 24 January 1944)
- Colonel (promoted to Major General 13 September 1944) Pavel Chernous (25 January 1944 – 9 May 1945)

== Composition ==
On 22 June 1941, the 47th Mountain Rifle Division contained the following units.

- 148th Mountain Rifle Regiment
- 334th Mountain Rifle Regiment
- 353rd Mountain Rifle Regiment
- 145th Mountain Rifle Regiment (until 28 December 1941)
- 113th Separate Antitank Battalion
- 499th Separate Antiaircraft Artillery Battalion
- 136th Cavalry Squadron
- 102nd Sapper Battalion
- 214th Separate Communications Battalion
- 58th Divisional Artillery Park
- 98th Medical Battalion
- 158th Trucking Company
- 124th Field Bakery
- 228th Field Ticket Office of the State Bank

The 47th Rifle Division was composed of the following units.

- 148th Rifle Regiment
- 334th Rifle Regiment
- 353rd Rifle Regiment
- 559th Artillery Regiment
- 113th Separate Antitank Battalion
- 400th Antiaircraft Artillery Battery (until 15 April 1943)
- 457th Machine Gun Battalion (from 10 January 1943 – 10 May 1943)
- 136th Intelligence Company
- 102nd Sapper Battalion
- 214th Separate Communications Battalion (because 539th Separate Communications Company)
- 98th Medical Battalion
- 10th (became 11th) Separate Chemical Defence Company
- 157th Trucking Company
- 300th Field Bakery
- 1633rd Field Post Office
- 1624th Field Ticket Office of the State Bank
