= 117th Rifle Division =

- Active: 1939 – 1946
- Allegiance: USSR
- Branch: Red Army
- Type: Infantry
- Size: 12,000
- Part of: Volga Military District

The Soviet 117th Rifle Division was a rifle division that served during the Second World War. Originally formed in 1939 destroyed and reformed during the war.

== History ==
=== First Formation ===
Formed on 23 August 1939 in the Volga Military District, under the command of Colonel Spiridon Chernyugov. On 22 June 1941 the division was still located in the district. The division was assigned to the 21st Army moving from the Volga Military District to Gomel in the Western Special Military District when the war started. The army was to attack north from Gomel area into the flank and rear of the German advance. On 5–6 July 1941 the division attacked across the Dnepr River at Zhlobin as part of the 63rd Rifle Corps and 21st Army. Of the 12,000 men assigned to the division and despite the support of the 546th Corps Artillery Regiment the division lost almost 20% of its strength in the space of two days. By 12 July the division was retreating behind the Dnepr River. By early September when the German 2nd Panzer Group struck south the division, along with most of the Central and Southwestern Fronts in the Kiev Pocket and annihilated. The division headquarters was disbanded on 20 September 1941.

==== Subordinate Units ====
- 240th Rifle Regiment
- 269th Rifle Regiment
- 275th Rifle Regiment
- 322nd Light Artillery Regiment
- 707th Howitzer Regiment
- 222nd Antitank Battalion
- 321st Anti-aircraft Battalion
- Tank Battalion (with 54 BT and T-26 tanks)

=== Second Formation ===
The second formation was formed on 7 January by redesignating the 308th Rifle Division at Ivanovo in the Moscow Military District. In late February the division left the Moscow Military District and moved to the Kalinin Front reserves. In March the Front assigned the division to the 3rd Shock Army and it remained in that army until February 1943. In February the division went back into Kalinin Front reserves as part of the 2nd Guards Rifle Corps and as part of this corps was assigned to the 22nd Army. In April 1943 the 22nd Army was transferred from the Kalinin to the Northwestern Front. In September 1943 the division was moved to the 4th Shock Army, which became part of the 1st Baltic Front after 20 October 1943. In February 1944 the division briefly served in the 1st Baltic Front's 43rd Army and then went into STAVKA reserves and moved south. In late April 1944 the division was assigned to the 91st Rifle Corps in the 69th Army of the 1st Belorussian Front. The division spent the rest of war under this command structure.

==== Subordinate Units ====
- 240th Rifle Regiment
- 269th Rifle Regiment
- 275th Rifle Regiment
- 322nd Artillery Regiment
- 222nd Antitank Battalion

== See also ==
- List of infantry divisions of the Soviet Union 1917–1957
