= Central Front =

Major formation of the Soviet Army during World War II

- Active: July 24 – August 25, 1941; February 15 – October 20, 1943
- Country: Soviet Union
- Branch: Red Army
- Type: Army Group Command
- Size: Several Armies
- Engagements: World War II; First Battle of Smolensk; Third Battle of Kharkov; Battle of Kursk; Operation Kutuzov; Battle of the Dnieper

Commanders
- Notable commanders: Fyodor Kuznetsov; Mikhail Yefremov; Konstantin Rokossovsky

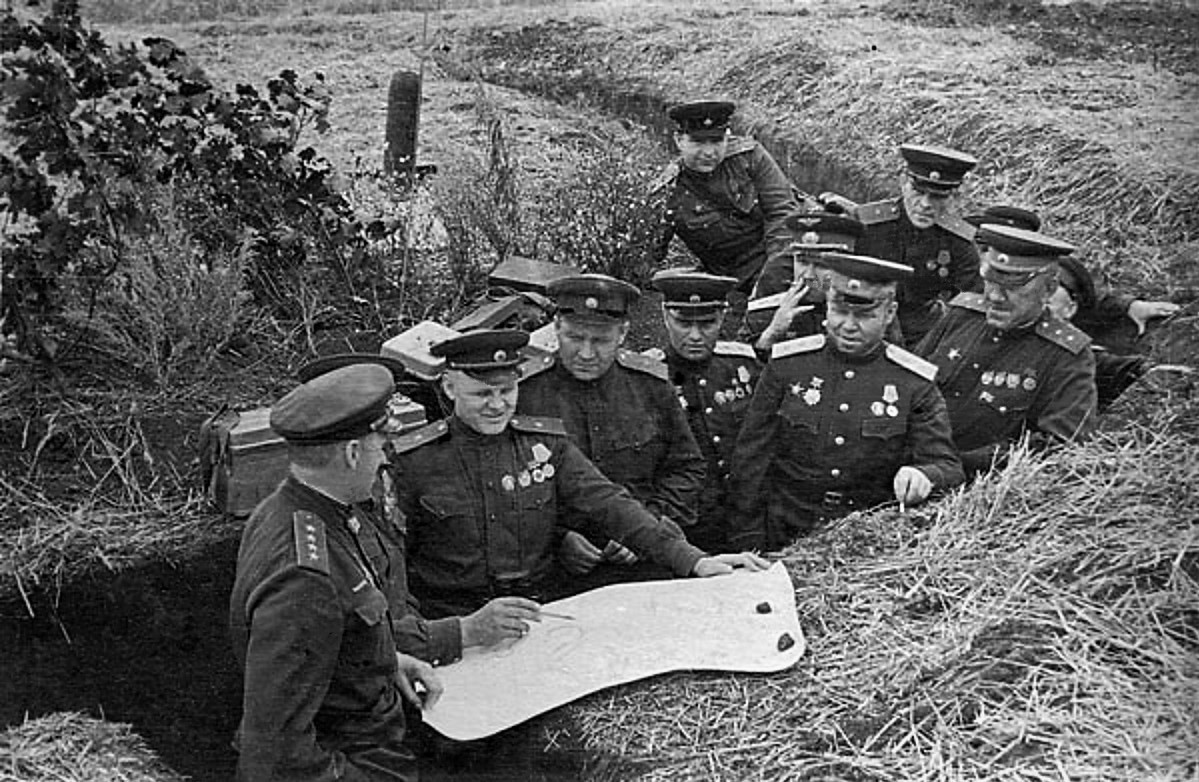

The Central Front was a major formation of the Red Army during the Second World War formed on July 24, 1941.

The Central Front describes either of two distinct organizations during the war. The first entity existed for just a month during the German invasion of 1941, before it was annihilated. A year and a half later, the name was revived for the second creation, which existed for about eight months in 1943, until it was incorporated into the Belorussian group of Fronts and renamed accordingly.

== First formation ==
The first version was created on July 24, 1941, from the right wing of the forces in the Western Front, including a new designation of the 3rd Army and the headquarters of the (disbanded) 4th Army, whose former HQ formed the Front headquarters. Colonel General Fyodor I. Kuznetsov took command.

The Front was a combination of the 13th and 21st Armies.

- The 13th Army (Konstantin Golubev) had under command
  - in the area of Mogilev, the
    - 61st Rifle Corps,
    - 20th Mechanised Corps,
  - in the area of Krichevsky, the
    - 45th Rifle corps,
    - 20th Rifle Corps.
- The 21st Army, under Lieutenant General Mikhail Yefremov, was the other initial component of the Front:
  - 25th Mechanised Corps,
  - 66th Rifle Corps,
  - 63rd Rifle Corps,
  - 21st Rifle Corps,
  - 67th Rifle Corps.

The new Front's air component was 136 aircraft (75 patched and repaired) under the command of Major General (Aviation) Grigory Vorozheikin. The Central Front thus became the first new Front formed after the German invasion.

At the time the Front was created its boundary with the Western front was along the Bryansk-Roslavl-Shklov-Minsk line (all inclusive for the Western front), and the main operational direction of the front was along the Gomel–Bobruisk–Volkovysk axis. On August 1, 3rd Army joined the Front, and on August 7 Kuznetsov was recalled to Moscow to be given a new assignment. The command was transferred to General Mikhail Yefremov.

On August 8, Heinz Guderian's Panzergruppe 2 began its attack along the 13th Army sector. Four days later the German Second Army joined the attack. On August 17, the 63rd Rifle Corps was routed at the village of Skepnya (20 km to the east of Zhlobin), and two days later elements of the Second Army occupied Gomel. On August 22, the 3rd Army fell back from Mozyr. Under these blows the Front was eventually encircled and destroyed near Chernigov, and was formally disbanded on August 25, 1941. The surviving forces transferred to the first version of the Bryansk Front.

== Second formation ==
The second version of this Front was created on February 15, 1943, from the Don Front. Then Colonel General Konstantin K. Rokossovsky took command, and was promoted to full General in April 1943. Lieutenant General Mikhail Malinin was named as Front Chief of Staff, while Major General K.F.Telegin was made the member of the Front's Military Council.

The Front incorporated the headquarters and forces of the Don Front, plus additional armies were made part of the Front :

- 2nd Tank Army - Alexey Rodin,
- 21st Army - Ivan Chistyakov,
- 65th Army - Pavel Batov,
- 70th Army (originally formed from NKVD forces) - German Tarasov
- 16th Air Army - General Lieutenant Sergei Rudenko.

The Front's headquarters was established around 10 km to the east of Yelets.

As part of Stavka's general move to integrate and rationalise its Army Groups, the Front was renamed the 1st Belorussian Front on October 20, 1943.
