= Jades =

Jades جدس
- Village
- Location within Iran
- Coordinates: 29°42′52″N 51°34′15″E
- Country: Iran
- Province: Fars
- County: Kazerun
- Bakhsh: Central
- Rural District: Deris

Population (2006)
  - Total: 367
- Time zone: UTC+3:30 (IRST)
  - Summer (DST): UTC+4:30 (IRDT)

Jades (Persian: جدس, also Romanized as Jaddes; also known as Ḩadas and Jadīs) is a village in Deris Rural District, in the Central District of Kazerun County, Fars province, Iran. At the 2006 census, its population was 367, in 80 families.
