= 21st Army (Soviet Union) =

- 21-я армия
- Active: 1941–1945
- Country: Soviet Union
- Branch: Red Army
- Type: Combined arms
- Size: Field army
- Engagements: World War II; First Battle of Smolensk; First Battle of Kiev; Second Battle of Kharkov; Battle of Stalingrad; Smolensk Operation; Vyborg–Petrozavodsk Offensive; Prague Offensive

Commanders
- Notable commanders: Fyodor Kuznetsov; Vasiliy Gordov; Mikhail Grigoryevich Yefremov; Vasily Kuznetsov; Nikolay Krylov

The Soviet 21st Army (Russian: 21-я армия) was a field army of the Red Army during World War II.

== Operational history ==
=== June–September 1941 ===
21st Army was a part of the Second Operational Echelon of the Red Army. It was formed from the forces of the Volga Military District in May 1941 and was initially based on 63rd Rifle Corps (53rd, 148th, and 167th Rifle Divisions) and 66th Rifle Corps. The army was under the command of Lieutenant-General Vasily Gerasimenko, and its chief of staff was Major-General Vasily Gordov. The commander of 63rd Rifle Corps was Lieutenant-General Leonid Petrovsky and the commander of 66th Rifle Corps was Major-General Fyodor Sudakov. In early June the army was moved to the eastern fringes of the Pripyat Marshes south of Homel. At the outbreak of hostilities on 22 June, the army was redeployed north to defend the right bank of the Dnepr between Rybchev and Stary-Bykhov. At the same time 25th Mechanized Corps, under the command of Major-General Semyon Krivoshein, was assigned to 21st Army from the Kharkov Military District.

On 27 June 1941, it was proposed to Joseph Stalin that the Soviet armies (13th Army, 19th Army, 20th Army, 21st, 22nd Army) would defend the line going through the Daugava-Polotsk-Vitebsk-Orsha-Mogilev-Mazyr. On 2 July, 21st Army was subordinated to the command of Western Front. On 4 July, the 3rd Panzer Division crossed the Dnepr and established a bridgehead on the east bank near Rahachow. Relentless assaults made by 63rd Rifle Corps from 21st Army forced the Germans to evacuate the bridgehead two days later. On 6 July a battle-group from the 21st Army (led by the 117th Rifle Division) crossed the Dnepr at Zhlobin south of Rahachow and attacked in direction of Babruysk. The Soviet attack was repelled by the German 10th Motorized Division with help from 3rd Panzer Division as German forces closed to the Dnepr, taking Rahachow and Zhlobin by 7 July and isolating 66th Rifle Corps' 117th Rifle Division in the eastern fringes of the Pripyat Marshes.

On 13 July, 21st Army, by this time under the command of Colonel-General Fyodor Kuznetsov, and reinforced with 67th Rifle Corps (commanded by Colonel Filipp Zhmachenko) and a cavalry group under the command of Colonel-General Oka Gorodovikov, went on the offensive again. Its 63rd Rifle Corps crossed Dnepr on pontoon bridges and recaptured Rahachow and Zhlobin, the first large towns to be retaken from German forces since the start of the invasion. Further south 232nd Rifle Division from 66th Rifle Corps under cover of woods, and with Gorodovikov's cavalry forces advancing off its left flank, gained 80 kilometres due west and took a bridgehead on Berezina river. The advance of 21st Army was brought to a halt after a few days by fresh German forces from the German Second Army moving east from Minsk after the final surrender of the Soviet frontier armies in western Belorussia. During the second half of July the frontline stabilised from southeast of Babruysk to the Dnepr north of Rahachow and along the Sozh.

On 24 July, 21st Army came under command of the newly formed Central Front. Fedor Kuznetsov was assigned to the command of this new Front, and Lieutenant-General Mikhail Eframov was assigned as the new commander of 21st Army. Subsequently, 3rd Army, under the command of Lieutenant-General Vasilii Kuznetsov, was assigned to the frontline off the left flank of 21st Army in the Pripyat Marshes. By early August, 21st Army's defences were beginning to crumble against increasing pressure from Second Army. On 7 August Eframov moved to the command of Central Front and Gordov assumed command of 21st Army.

When on 12 August Krychaw was taken by the Guderian's 2nd Panzer Group, the 21st Army with its right flank severed began to withdraw to the east. Its new defensive position was to be on the line of river Desna. Zhlobin fell to Second Army on 14 August and the bridges over the Dnepr to the east of the town, though damaged, were taken in usable condition. Rahachow was taken by Second Army the next day and a sizable Soviet force, predominantly from 63 Rifle Corps, became trapped in the resultant pocket. The advance of Second Army towards Homel was slowed by counterattacks from 21st Army, but Gordov's army was being threatened with encirclement by the southward advance of 2nd Panzer Group from Krychaw. Homel was taken by forces from Second Army on 20 August but not before the bridges over the Sozh had been destroyed. On 25 August Central Front was disbanded; 21st Army and 3rd Army were merged, assigned to the newly created Bryansk Front, and, though the combined force was still designated 21st Army, Vasilii Kuznetsov was appointed to its command.

On 26 August German 2nd Panzer Group secured a bridgehead on the Desna's eastern bank near Novhorod-Siverskyi which threatened the eastern flank of 21st Army. Kuznetsov ordered a withdrawal over the river Desna. Unfortunately Kuznetsov did not inform the neighbouring Soviet units about his decision. Because of that 40th Army was forced to abort its attack on the German bridgehead near Novhorod-Siverskyi and the army commander, Major-General Kuzma Podlas, ordered a retreat to the southeast. Thus 21st Army, between South Western Front's 40th and 5th Armies was cut off from the forces of Bryansk Front. Kuznetsov can't be blamed for that decision because his army was at that point already beaten by German forces and in full retreat. In this situation on 6 September Kuznetsov's army was placed under the command of Southwestern Front. By then the advance by 2nd Panzer Group had forced a gap between South Western Front and Bryansk Front, and 21st Army, continuing to retreat to the south, became caught up in a vast encirclement that became the Battle of Kiev (1941). During the second week of September a significant portion of 21st Army was able to escape eastwards through gaps in 2nd Panzer Group's lines between Priluki and Piriatin, but the bulk of the army found itself, together with the rest of South Western Front, in a tightening encirclement east of Kiev. Only a few thousand soldiers, mainly from 21st Army and 5th Army, together with 500 men from Kuznetsov's headquarters staff, escaped from the final encirclement of South Western Front in the second half of September.

=== October 1941 – May 1942 ===
On 26 September, Colonel-General Yakov Cherevichenko was appointed to the command of the residual forces of 21st Army that had escaped encirclement at Kiev. The army grew rapidly in strength as reserves were fed into Ukraine from the Soviet strategic reserve, so that by the beginning of October the army included three rifle divisions and five cavalry divisions. On 5 October Fyodor Kuznetsov briefly resumed command of 21st Army. By then it had become clear to Soviet high command that the main thrust of the German autumn offensive would not be directed at the Kharkov – Belgorod axis, the defence of which was assigned to South Western Front. On 15 October command of 21st Army reverted once again to Vasiliy Gordov, and Major-General Aleksei Danilov was appointed as the army's chief of staff. During October, under constant pressure from the German Sixth Army, 21st Army withdrew steadily to the east on the Belgorod axis north of Kharkov towards the upper Donets. Since the German mechanised forces had been directed towards Moscow and Rostov, Gordov's forces easily avoided encirclement by the slow-moving infantry divisions of Sixth Army, and by early November the frontline had begun to stabilise along the upper Donets.

On 1 January 1942, 21st Army, which by then included six rifle divisions, launched an offensive towards Oboyan against part of the German Sixth Army. This was part of a wider offensive by South Western Front and Southern Front to retake Kursk, Kharkov and the Donbas; the offensive in Ukraine, being part of a general winter offensive by the Red Army that stretched from the Baltic to the Black Sea. By 3 January, the 21st Army, in conjunction with 40th Army further north, was involved in heavy fighting on the line of the Seym River, and the next day Gordov's forces cut the Belgorod – Kursk road and began to close in on Oboyan. However, by 5 January the progress of 21st Army had stalled after a series of counterattacks by Sixth Army. On 10 January Sixth Army attacked 21st Army's right flank north of Oboyan and also attacked the army's positions south of the town. Gordov could not prevent German forces from breaking through his lines and threatening the rear of his forward units. This German counterattack brought South Western Front's offensive north of Kharkov to an end and placed 21st Army on the defensive along the upper Donets for the rest of the winter and spring.

On 12 May 1942 South Western Front launched a renewed offensive to take Kharkov. 21st Army was to be part of the northern arm of an attempt to encircle the city from north and south. In conjunction with 28th Army on its left, Gordov's forces attacked XVII Army Corps of the German Sixth Army. For several days it seemed that a breakthrough against XVII Army Corps might be possible, but a reserve Soviet cavalry corps was not available in time to support the offensive and the Soviet advance stalled short of Kharkov in the face of effective German defences.

=== June 1942 – April 1943 ===
By late June 1942, 21st Army, with nine rifle divisions and a tank corps, occupied the northern flank of Southwestern Front along 100 kilometres of frontline east of Belgorod. Gordov's army, facing the left flank of the German Sixth Army and the right flank of the newly introduced Hungarian Second Army, was still flanked on its right by 40th Army, but 40th Army at this time constituted the southern wing of Bryansk Front which was responsible for the defence of the Voronezh axis. On 28 June the main German strategic offensive of 1942, Case Blue, began. The initial German objectives were to break through the left wing of Bryansk Front in an advance to the Don at Voronezh, and, further south, to then break through the left wing of 21st Army in an advance towards Stary Oskol that would encircle 21st Army and 40th Army. Subsequently, German mechanised forces would advance down the right bank of the Don in order to encircle South Western Front, and would develop the offensive into the great bend of the Don and across the lower Don in order to encircle Southern Front, interdict the Volga river traffic at Stalingrad and secure the oilfields at Maykop. Within days of the opening of the German offensive, the right wing and centre of 40th Army had disintegrated and German mechanised forces were advancing rapidly towards Voronezh. On 30 June, XL Panzer Corps, subordinated to the German Sixth Army, struck 21st Army's left flank 40 kilometres southeast of Belgorod. At the same time German mechanised forces that had broken through the centre of 40th Army began to move towards Stary Oskol. On 1 July, with XL Panzer Corps breaking through 21st Army's lines and rendering the left wing of 40th Army and the bulk of 21st Army at risk of encirclement, Gordov was given permission to withdraw to the east. Making effective use of rearguards, Gordov and his staff managed to slow the German advance sufficiently to enable the bulk of 21st Army to reach the Don in the Liski area, and to withdraw to the relative safety of the left bank of the river.

On 12 July, as 21st Army was being deployed further south to defend the left bank of the Don bend in the Serafimovich – Kletskaya sector, Gordov was assigned to the command of one of three reserve armies that had been activated and were in the process of being deployed to the Don. Danilov was then assigned to the command of 21st Army and Colonel Valentin Penskovskii became the army's chief of staff. On 26 July, the 21st Army crossed the Don to attack German Sixth Army positions on the right bank of the river in the Serafimovich – Kletskaya sector. This attack was made to support the Soviet 62nd Army which was under severe pressure from Sixth Army in the Don bend, but the attack was only partially successful and by early August the offensive had stalled. Yet it left Danilov's forces in control of substantial bridgeheads on the right bank of the river at Serafimovich and Kletskaya, bridgeheads that the over-stretched Sixth Army did not have the resources to eliminate. By the fourth week of July Sixth Army had secured bridgeheads on the left bank of the Don at its eastern extremity, and were preparing for an advance across the narrow strip of land to the Volga north of Stalingrad. In conjunction with other Soviet forces facing Sixth Army, 21st Army launched desperate attacks on Sixth Army's positions to try to relieve the pressure on 62nd Army's defences on the left bank of the Don. These attacks failed to prevent Sixth Army from reaching the Volga, but 21st Army managed to enlarge its bridgehead at Serafimovich.

During August and September, as the battle for the city of Stalingrad progressed, 21st Army maintained the pressure on Sixth Army's positions on the right bank of the Don. During October the Rumanian Third Army replaced German divisions defending the northern sector of the Don bend, but the Rumanians were unable to prevent 21st Army from further enlarging the Serafimovich bridgehead. Soviet high command had decided to use the Serafimovich bridgehead to launch a major offensive (codenamed Uranus) to the southeast which, in conjunction with an offensive from Soviet positions south of Stalingrad, would strike into the flanks of Sixth Army to end the siege of the city. At the beginning of November Major-General Ivan Chistyakov replaced Danilov as commander of 21st Army. (Penskovskii, promoted in October to the rank of Major-General, remained as the army's chief of staff). Subsequently, 21st Army was reinforced with a tank corps and an elite cavalry corps. By then the army's bridgehead on the right bank of the Don was 50 kilometres long stretching from west of Serafimovich to east of Kletskaya. During November, 21st Army relinquished control of the Serafimovich sector of the bridgehead to the newly arrived 5th Tank Army. This tank army and the mobile forces of 21st Army were to spearhead the encirclement drive from the north.

Operation Uranus began in freezing fog on the morning of 19 November. By midday, though 6th Rumanian Infantry Division on 21st Army's right flank held its ground, the resistance of the other Rumanian forces facing 21st Army began to crumble and the army's mobile corps were committed to the offensive. By mid afternoon 21st Army's two mobile corps had broken through the Rumanian lines, and, as the cavalry corps turned east to attack the flank of Sixth Army's XI Army Corps, the tank corps advanced rapidly to the southeast in parallel with a tank corps from 5th Tank Army. On 21 November, the 21st Army's tank corps reached the Don near its eastern extremity and deep in Sixth Army's rear. The next day, further south, the tank corps from 5th Tank Army crossed the Don, and on 23 November linked up with mechanised forces from the Soviet's southern offensive. The whole of the German Sixth Army was surrounded in, and west of, Stalingrad, and five divisions of the Rumanian Third Army were encircled between the right wing of 21st Army and the left wing of 5th Tank Army in the Verkhne Fomikhinsky – Raspopinskaya area. Soviet commanders moved rapidly to secure the encirclement of Sixth Army. While part of 21st Army was committed to the subjugation of the surrounded Rumanian divisions on its right flank, the rest of the army advanced south and east into the Don bend. Sixth Army did not try to defend the right bank of the Don; the army's XI Army Corps had pull back to the left bank by 26 November and over the next few days pulled back further to the east to form part of a tighter defensive perimeter. Chistiakov's forces followed to form the western face of the Stalingrad encirclement, an encirclement that included a further six Soviet armies. In all, 22 Axis divisions were caught in the Stalingrad encirclement east of the Don. This was a far larger force than the Soviet high command had expected to ensnare, and throughout December piecemeal Soviet attacks on the Stalingrad perimeter achieved little. To break through the German defences a carefully prepared and coordinated offensive would be required. By the beginning of January 1943 the Soviet armies of the Stalingrad perimeter had been brought under one Front command (Don Front), and the general offensive (Operation Ring) began on 10 January. By this time the combat effectiveness of Sixth Army had been eroded by shortages of food, fuel and ammunition, yet the attacks against most of the perimeter made little progress. Only on the western and north-western face of the perimeter, where the German defences were weakest, was significant progress made by 21st Army and its neighbouring 65th Army. Six days later Pitomnik, the larger of Sixth Army's two major airbases, was taken, and Gumrak, the second airbase fell on 22 January. Four days later forces from 21st Army, advancing towards Stalingrad from the west, met forces from 62nd Army which had broken through the centre of the city to its western outskirts. Sixth Army was cut in two, and by early February the last German forces in the city had surrendered.

Within days of Sixth Army's surrender, preparations were underway for the deployment of several of the Soviet armies from the Stalingrad battle, including 21st Army, north to the Livny area to assist in a major offensive towards Kursk. Chistiakov's divisions did not begin to arrive in the Livny area until the second week in March by which time, instead of being committed to the offensive, they were deployed to the Oboyan area to defend against German mechanised forces that were threatening to advance north from Belgorod. Over the subsequent weeks the defensive positions of 21st Army south of Oboyan were to become the southern face of the Kursk salient.

At the beginning of May 1943 the designation of Chistiakov's army, in recognition of the part it had played in the battle of Stalingrad, was changed from 21st Army to 6th Guards Army. This change of designation was not made public until July.

=== July–October 1943 ===
On 12 July 1943 the 3rd Reserve Army, part of the Red Army's strategic reserve, was designated as the new formation of 21st Army. On 23 July it was transferred from the reserve to the operational army and at the beginning of August was assigned to Western Front to participate in an offensive to retake Smolensk (Operation Suvorov). At that time the army, under the command of Lieutenant-General Nikolai Krylov (chief of staff – Major-General Pavel Tikhomirov), included eight rifle divisions. The first phase of Operation Suvorov began on 7 August (without 21st Army's initial participation), but made little progress. Spas Demensk was taken on 13 August but thereafter the offensive began to stall. Changing the axis of the offensive from southwest towards Roslavl to a westerly offensive towards Elnia, Western Front renewed its efforts on 28 August using 21st Army and 10th Guards Army to spearhead the attack. Elnia was taken three days later, but 21st Army was unable to advance further to the west. Western Front ordered another operational pause until mid-September. By the time the offensive was resumed on 14 September, the defending German Fourth Army had been so weakened by the transfer of forces to other sectors of the frontline, that it made no determined attempt to defend its positions. Instead, it began a planned withdrawal to more defensible positions east of Orsha. As Fourth Army withdrew, Western Front's armies followed, and in the second half of September, 21st Army advanced 140 kilometres west from Elnia to the Belorussian border southwest of Krasnii where it was stopped by determined German resistance in prepared positions.

At the end of October, 21st Army Headquarters was returned to the high command reserve, the army's rifle divisions having been assigned to Western Front's 33rd Army and 68th Army.

=== May–September 1944 ===
After the failure of armistice negotiations between the Soviets and the Finns in the spring of 1944, the Stavka began preparations for an offensive in eastern Karelia and in the Karelian Isthmus to retake territory lost to the Finns in 1941. In order to destroy the Finnish Army and force Finland out of the war, the Stavka decided to conduct the two-pronged Vyborg–Petrozavodsk Offensive. At the beginning of May 1944, the headquarters of 21st Army, under the command of Lieutenant-General Dmitrii Gusev, was assigned from the reserves to Leningrad Front. His task was to take command of forces facing the Finnish army's IV Corps in the western half of the frontline in the Karelian Isthmus north of Leningrad. The offensive was planned to begin in early June, by which time 21st Army included nine rifle divisions subordinated to three rifle corps headquarters:

- 30th Guards Rifle Corps (45th, 63rd and 64th Guards Rifle Divisions)
- 97th Rifle Corps (178th, 358th and 381st Rifle Divisions)
- 109th Rifle Corps (72nd, 109th and 286th Rifle Divisions)
- 22nd Fortified Region

On 9 June, 21st Army, supported by the guns of the Soviet Baltic Fleet, opened a massive artillery barrage against IV Corps' positions. The next day, on 10 June, after a further artillery barrage, the Soviet 21st Army, spearheaded by 30th Guards Corps and with ample air and armoured support, opened the offensive on the Valkeasaari sector, which was defended by the 1st Infantry Regiment of the Finnish 10th Division. During the day, the Soviet units captured frontline trenches and destroyed fortifications, shattering the first Finnish "Main line" of the breakthrough sector. IV Corps was forced back to its second defence line and the Finns were obliged to send in reinforcements to try to stabilise their defensive position. On 13 June, the Soviet 21st Army reached the partially-completed VT-line (Vammelsuu-Taipale) as part of the second line defences at the town of Kuuterselkä, running 20 kilometres behind the "Main line". After two days of fighting, on 15 June, the VT-line was breached at Kuuterselkä by the 109th Rifle Division. As a result, the western sector of IV Corps' second line defences had been overrun and Finnish high command ordered its forces to withdraw to the third defence line, the VKT-line (Viipuri-Kuparsaari-Taipale), based on the Vuoksi River. This defence line ran to the north and northeast of the important city and seaport of Vyborg. Following IV Corps' withdrawal, 21st Army advanced north and on 20 June, took Vyborg against negligible Finnish resistance.

Gusev, who was promoted to the rank of colonel-general on 18 June, was ordered to continue the offensive further north to break the Finnish defences at the villages of Tali, northeast of Vyborg, and at Ihantala, north of Vyborg. The renewed Soviet offensive began on 25 June against IV Corps' defences in the Tali area, culminating into the Battle of Tali–Ihantala. After four days of intense fighting, during which both sides fed reserves into the battle, the Finns were pushed back, but their lines did not break under the heavy Soviet manpower. On 3 July, 21st Army attacked Finnish defensive positions at Ihantala, but the attack had been anticipated by the Finns and after several days of effort, 21st Army's forces had made few gains. By 6 July, after four weeks of intense fighting and after having sustained heavy casualties, 21st Army's offensive capacity was exhausted as a result of their swift advance. Within days, some of 21st Army's best units were being withdrawn for deployment to other Soviet armies further south, and by mid-July, the offensive in the Karelian Isthmus had been terminated. 21st Army remained with Leningrad Front until the end of September 1944, when it was again returned to the high command reserve.

=== November 1944 – May 1945 ===
On 11 December 1944, the 21st Army was assigned to the 1st Ukrainian Front from the high command reserve. From this date, 21st Army remained operationally active throughout the remainder of the war. (In November, 21st Army had been briefly assigned to the operational army before being returned once again to the high command reserve). Dmitrii Gusev was still the army commander, and the army chief of staff was Major-General Georgii Bukhovets. (Bukhovets had replaced Major-General Victor Petukhov as chief of staff in June 1944). In December 1944, 1st Ukrainian Front occupied a largely static frontline in southern Poland, a frontline that had changed little since the autumn. The Front's main offensive efforts during that time had been directed towards expanding a bridgehead over the Vistula in the Sandomierz area, and in attempting to advance its left wing through the northern Carpathians into Slovakia. However, Stavka was planning a major offensive in Poland, and by December, planning was well-advanced

The offensive opened in the early morning of 12 January 1945 in a breakout from the Sandomierz bridgehead. Gusev's forces were not part of the breakout effort; 21st Army was one of 1st Ukrainian Front's reserve armies and it was not committed to the action until 17 January. By that time, 1st Ukrainian Front had advanced deep into southern Poland, and 21st Army was deployed against the German Seventeenth Army in the Miechow area for an attack towards Zawiercie and subsequently Tarnowskie Gory in order to outflank the Katowice industrial area from the north. For this task, 21st Army was reinforced with a tank corps and with an elite cavalry corps, and by 23 January, it had bypassed German forces in Silesia from the north, its right wing having reached the Oder near Opole, and its left flank having reached Tarnowskie Gory. From Opole 21st Army's cavalry corps, in conjunction with mechanised forces from a Soviet tank army, was turned to the southeast into the German rear and down the right bank of the Oder towards Raciborz. Meanwhile, the rest of 21st Army ceased its outflanking move to the west and attacked east towards Katowice. This manoeuvre, made in conjunction with a westerly advance further south by 4th Ukrainian Front, threatened German forces in the Katowice industrial area with encirclement and forced their withdrawal by 29 January.

Thereafter the priority for 1st Ukrainian Front was to cross the Oder and to advance to the river Neisse, from where it was planned it would launch its final offensive towards Dresden and central Germany. By early February, 1st Ukrainian Front had established two bridgeheads over the Oder at Scinawa Mala (formerly Steinau), which was downriver from Wroclaw (formerly Breslau), and at Brzeg, which was between Wroclaw and Opole. Both 5th Guards Army and 21st Army were concentrated into the southern bridgehead, with 21st Army on the left wing. The breakout from the northern bridgehead began on 8 February and within days had forced a gap of more than 100 kilometres in the German lines. The breakout from the Brzeg bridgehead against the German Seventeenth Army began on 14 February. 5th Guards Army advanced to the west and northwest to encircle the substantial German garrison at Wroclaw, and 21st Army advanced to the southwest towards Grodkow. The subsequent advance of 21st Army was modest compared to that made by the armies of 1st Ukrainian Front further west. As the axis of 1st Ukrainian Front's offensive shifted to the west, 21st Army found itself on a relatively inactive sector of the frontline. It was not until mid-March that 1st Ukrainian Front was able to deploy sufficient forces to its left flank to conduct an offensive there. By then, the Front was ready to mount a combined attack north and south of Opole towards the Prudnik area, an attack that was expected to outflank much of Seventeenth Army. The northern force, which included 21st Army, was to attack southwest from the Grodkow area. The southern force would attack to the west from the Kedzierzyn-Kozle area. Within four days, a number of German divisions in the Opole area had been destroyed by this offensive and by the end of the month, 21st Army occupied a 70 kilometre sector of the frontline some 40 kilometres southwest of Wroclaw. In April, this frontline stabilised again as 1st Ukrainian Front's resources were directed to the west for the impending offensive across the Neisse into central Germany.

In early May, as representatives of the German government were beginning to discuss with the Allies a general surrender of German forces, Soviet high command decided to launch a final offensive against Army Group Centre. The main objective was the capture of Prague, but other Soviet armies facing Army Group Centre's frontline further east, including 21st Army, were required to participate in placing the whole of Army Group Centre under pressure. The hurriedly prepared offensive by more than twenty Soviet armies was launched on 5 May and made rapid progress. Over the subsequent four days, 21st Army advanced 70 kilometres, taking Wałbrzych and crossing the Czech border to reach Jaromerz by the war's end on 9 May.

== 21st Army Order of Battle on 22 June 1941 ==
Source: Leo Niehorster

Commander: Lieutenant-General Vasilii Gerasimenko

Infantry Forces:

63rd Rifle Corps – Lieutenant-General Leonid Petrovskii

- 53rd Rifle Division – Colonel Filipp Konovalov
- 148th Rifle Division – Colonel Filipp Cherokmanov
- 167th Rifle Division – Colonel Vasily Rakovsky

66th Rifle Corps – Major-General Fedor Sudakov

- 61st Rifle Division – Colonel Nikolay Prishchepa
- 117th Rifle Division – Colonel Spiridon Chernyugov
- 154th Rifle Division – Colonel Yakov Fokanov

Artillery:

- 387th Howitzer Regiment of the Highest Command Reserve (RGK)
- 420th Corps Artillery Regiment
- 546th Corps Artillery Regiment

Mechanised Forces:

25th Mechanized Corps – Major-General Semen Krivoshein

- 50th Tank Division – Colonel Boris Bakharov
- 55th Tank Division – Colonel Vasily Badanov
- 219th Mechanized Division – Major-General Korzun
- 12th Motorcycle Regiment

== Commanders ==
Commanders

- Lieutenant General Vasyl Herasymenko (June – 6 July 1941)
- Marshal Semyon Budyonny (6–10 July 1941)
- Colonel-General Fyodor Kuznetsov (10–24 July 1941)
- Lieutenant General Mikhail Grigoryevich Yefremov (24 July – 7 August 1941)
- Major General Vasiliy Gordov (7–24 August 1941)
- Lieutenant General Vasily Kuznetsov (25 August – 26 September 1941)
- Colonel-General Yakov Cherevichenko (26 September – 5 October 1941)
- Colonel-General Fyodor Kuznetsov (5–10 October 1941)
- Major General Vasiliy Gordov (15 October 1941 – June 1942)
- Major General Alexei Danilov (July – 1 November 1942)
- Lieutenant General Ivan Chistyakov (November 1942 – April 1943)
- Lieutenant General Nikolay Krylov (12 July – 24 October 1943)
- Lieutenant General Yevgeny Zhuravlev (24 October 1943 – 25 February 1944)
- Lieutenant General Vasily Shvetsov (February – April 1944)
- Colonel-General Dmitry Gusev (April 1944 – May 1945)
