= 67th Rifle Corps =

Red Army unit in World War II

The 67th Rifle Corps was a corps of the Red Army during World War II, formed twice.

== First formation ==
The corps was formed in March 1940 in the Kharkov Military District with the 102nd Rifle Division, 132nd, and 151st Rifle Divisions, 194th Separate Combat Engineer Battalion, 207th Separate Communications Battalion. The corps headquarters was stationed in Poltava, the regional center, Ukrainian SSR. On 22 June 1941, the corps was stationed Poltava – of Tarascha, Kharkov Military District. It was part of the Supreme Command Reserve.

On 2 July the corps was transferred into the body 21st Army Western Front. By 1 September 1941 the 67th Rifle Corps was deployed on the line Obolon – Reymentarovka – Jades – Semenivka front to the east and began an offensive against the units of the 2nd Panzer Group. That day it was listed in the Combat composition of the Soviet Army (BSSA) as consisting of the 24th, 42nd, and 277th Rifle Divisions. However, on 2 September the Corps came under the flank attack by the Das Reich Motorized Division and the German 1st Cavalry Division and began to withdraw to their original positions. At the end of September 1941 the remains of the corps was destroyed in the Kiev pocket, the corps headquarters was disbanded 13 October 1941.

=== Formations and units ===
- 102nd Rifle Division
- 132nd Rifle Division
- 151st Rifle Division
- 167th Rifle Division It transferred to the corps on 12 August 1941. A few days later almost completely destroyed in the area Dovsk – Tours – Grabovo.
- 435th Artillery Regiment. Period of entry into the army to 2 July 1941. Disbanded 24 December 1941.
- 645th Artillery Regiment.
- 194th separate sapper battalion. Period of entry to active duty from 2 July on 1 October 1941.
- 207th separate battalion of communication. Period of entry to active duty from 2 July on 1 October 1941.

=== Command ===
- Zhmachenko Philip Feodosevich, brigade commander, Corps Commander (March 1940 – July 1941)
- Galitsky Kuzma Nikitivich, Major-General, the corps commander (July – August 1941)
- Gusev, Nikolai Andrianovich, brigade commander, commander of the Corps (17 August 1941)

On 22 June 1941 the corps headquarters was in Poltava, a special part of the body of Poltava – of Tarascha, at the Kharkov Military District, composed of troops RGK.

- 102nd Rifle Division. The division commander, Colonel P. Hutz. Deployment of Management and divisional special units in Kremenchug.
- 132nd Rifle Division. The division commander Major General Sergey Biryuzov.

== Second Formation ==
The corps was reformed for a second time in June 1943.

=== Composition ===
On 1 August 1943 it is listed by BSSA as being part of 12th Army, Southwestern Front, and including 172nd Rifle Division and 333rd Rifle Division. A month later it had 60th Guards Rifle Division, 172nd, and 350th Rifle Divisions. On 1 October it was part of 58th Army in the Reserves of the Supreme High Command (RVGK) and included 87th, 127th, and 271st Rifle Divisions. On 1 November it was part of 4th Ukrainian Front, 28th Army, with 118th, 263rd, and 267th Rifle Divisions. A month later, it had been moved into the 4th Ukrainian Front troops, with 151st, 302nd, and 417th Rifle Divisions.
