= Vasily Gerasimenko =

Soviet Army general (1900–1961)

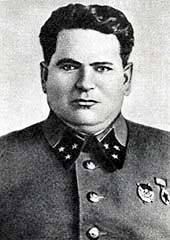
- Born: 24 April 1900; Poltava Governorate, Russian Empire
- Died: 13 February 1961 (aged 60) Kiev, USSR
- Allegiance: Soviet Union
- Service years: 1918–1953
- Rank: Lieutenant general
- Commands: Kiev Military District; Volga Military District; 21st Army; 13th Army; Stalingrad Military District; 28th Army; Kharkov Military District

Vasily Filippovich Gerasimenko (Russian: Василий Филиппович Герасименко, Ukrainian: Василь Пилипович Герасименко, Vasyl Pylypovych Herasymenko) was a Soviet Army lieutenant general who held field army command during World War II.

A Ukrainian, he was nominally and temporarily appointed the People's Commissar of Defense of the Ukrainian SSR in 1944-45.

== Biography ==
Vasily Filippovich Herasymenko was born in a village of Velyka Burimka, Poltava Governorate (today part of Zolotonosha Raion, Cherkasy Oblast) on April 24, 1900 in a peasant family. When he was nine years old, together with mother they moved to relatives in Kuban, stanytsia Berezanska. There Herasymenko finished a village school and the Nikol city college in Yekaterinodar.

In 1918, Herasymenko joined the Red Army and during the Russian Civil War he fought at the Northern Caucasus and the Southern Russia. In 1920, Herasymenko joined the Communist Party of the Soviet Union and in 1922 he finished the courses of commanding staff of the Red Army. In 1927, Herasymenko also finished the Joint Military School in Minsk and in 1931 - the M. V. Frunze Military Academy. In August 1937, Herasymenko was appointed commander of the 8th Rifle Corps. In 1938, he was a deputy commander of the Kiev Special Military District (see Kiev Military District). During World War II in July 1940 Herasymenko was appointed the commander of Volga Military District. At that time he was promoted to Lieutenant General. In 1940, under the command of Georgy Zhukov participated in the invasion of Romania as a commander of the 5th Army.

At the start of the German invasion of the Soviet Union in 1941, Herasymenko commanded the 21st Army and the 13th Army at the Western Front. In the fall of the same year he was transferred to the Reserve Front staff personnel. In December 1941, Herasymenko was appointed the commander of Stalingrad Military District. In September 1942 to November 1943, he commanded the 28th Army that participated in the Rostov operation and the Melitopol Offensive as well as the Donbas Strategic Offensive. In January 1944 Herasymenko was appointed the commander of Kharkiv Military District forces, but already in March 1944 he was appointed the commander of Kiev Military District and the People's Commissar of Defense of the Ukrainian SSR. The decree of Ukrainian parliament Presidium was signed on March 11, 1944 and legalized the decision that was adopted by the Stavka of Commander-in-Chief and the State Defense Committee (both headed by Stalin).

On 13 November 1945, by decision of Stalin as Supreme Commander of the Armed Forces of the Soviet Union Lieutenant General Gerasimenko was dismissed from the post of narkom and district commander and transferred to Riga where he stayed until September 1953 as part of the Baltic Military District staff personnel. In 1949, Herasymenko finished the higher academic courses at the Voroshilov Military Academy. In 1953, he was dismissed to reserves due to his health.

Military offices
Preceded by Trifon Shevaldin	Commander of the Volga Military District; 1940–1941	Succeeded by Matvei Popov
Preceded by Nikolay Feklenko	Commander of the Stalingrad Military District; 1941–1942	Succeeded by Viktor Kosyakin
Preceded by Vasily Kryuchenkin	Commander of the 28th Army; September 1942–November 1943	Succeeded by Aleksei Grechkin
Preceded by Yakov Cherevichenko	Commander of the Kharkiv Military District; 1944	Succeeded by Stepan Kalinin
Preceded by Viktor Kosyakin	Commander of the Kiev Military District; 1944–1945	Succeeded by Andrei Grechko
Political offices
Preceded by office introduced	People's Commissar of Defense of the Ukrainian SSR; 1944–1945	Succeeded by office liquidated
