= Pettend, Fejér =

Village in Fejér County, Hungary

Pettend
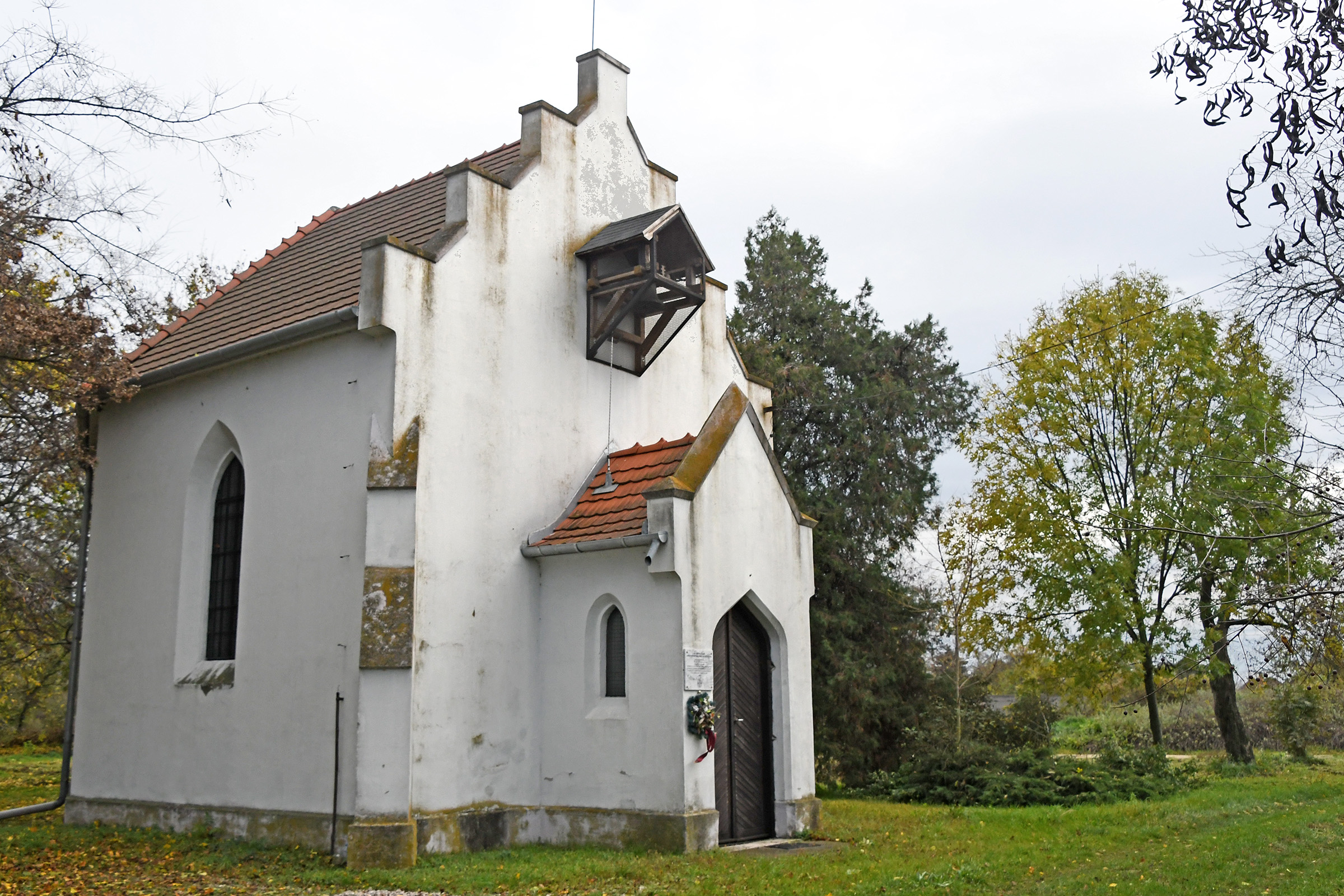

- Location of Pettend
- Coordinates: 47.26269°N 18.71614°E
- Country: Hungary

Area
  - Total: 5.98 km^{2} (2.31 sq mi)

Population (2004)
  - Total: 171
  - Density: 28.59/km^{2} (74.0/sq mi)
- Time zone: UTC+1 (CET)
  - Summer (DST): UTC+2 (CEST)
- Postal code: 2475
- Area code: 22

Pettend is a village in Fejér County, Hungary. Squeezed between the 7 main road and the Budapest–Murakeresztúr railway, Pettend is a hamlet of Kápolnásnyék that occupies 5.98 km^{2} (2.31 sq mi) of gently rolling loess three kilometres east of the parent village and ten kilometres north-east of Lake Velence. Archival abstracts in the History of Fejér County record the name as early as 1429, when King Sigismund summoned county jurors—including nobleman János, son of Antal Pettendy—to a court session in Székesfehérvár; further deeds of 1486 and 1517 place the Pettendy, Finta and Balassa families among the principal landholders, showing that Pettend functioned for centuries as a minor seat of Fejér-county gentry.

Modern fame rests on a vanished house: the Luczenbacher Castle, an English-Gothic manor designed by Adolf Voyta and finished in 1896 for thoroughbred breeder Miklós Luczenbacher. Contemporary photographs show red-brick turrets rising beside the railway, while estate records speak of a 1,000-hectare stud farm whose horses dominated Hungarian racing between the wars. Nationalised in 1945, the château was stripped for building stone in the 1960s; only a half-ruined service wing and the family chapel survive, but press retrospectives still call the lost palace "one of the country's few true Gothic revival castles".

Railway builders and estate workers swelled the hamlet in the early twentieth century, prompting erection of the single-nave Chapel of the Transfiguration in 1902; served first from Pázmánd and, since 1935, from Kápolnásnyék, the whitewashed chapel still hosts monthly Mass for a congregation drawn from Pettend's 380 residents and surrounding farmsteads. The settlement straddles Pettend halt, where hourly regional trains connect locals with Székesfehérvár and Budapest; a small industrial siding once loaded grain from the Luczenbacher estate but its rails were lifted in 1992. Today most inhabitants commute to the Velence-lake tourism belt or to the Dunaújváros steelworks, yet traces of gentry heritage linger in the landscape: poplar alleys still mark former paddock roads, a wrought iron gate from the stud farm fronts a private garden, and information panels beside the chapel guide hikers along a short loop that visits the castle earthworks and the disused quarry whose stone built both manor and chapel.
