= 25th Mechanized Corps =

- Active: 1941
- Country: Soviet Union
- Branch: Red Army
- Type: Mechanized corps
- Engagements: World War II: Battle of Smolensk (1941)

Commanders
- Notable commanders: Semyon Krivoshein

The 25th Mechanized Corps (Military Unit Number 7655) was a Mechanized corps of the Red Army. Formed in March 1941, the corps fought in the Battle of Smolensk. Its headquarters and that of the 20th Rifle Corps were combined in August 1941 to form the Bryansk Front headquarters.

== History ==
=== Formation ===
The 25th Mechanized Corps was formed in March 1941 at Kharkov in the Kharkov Military District. The corps included the 50th and 55th Tank Divisions, and the 219th Motorized Division. The 50th Tank Division was formed at Kharkov, the 55th at Chuguyev, and the 219th Motorized Division at Akhtyrka. The corps was commanded by Major General Semyon Krivoshein.

=== World War II ===
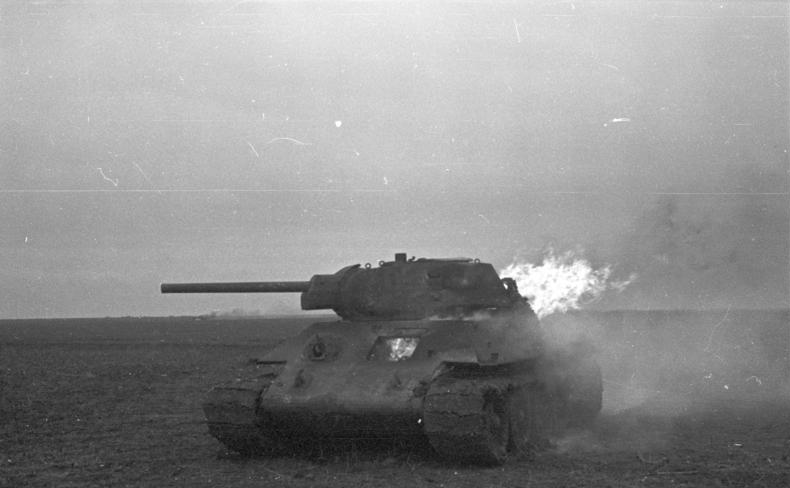
Burning T-34 tank of the type used by the corps

The 25th Mechanized Corps was part of the Reserve of the Supreme High Command on 22 June 1941, the date of Operation Barbarossa, the German invasion of the Soviet Union. Between 24 and 29 June it deployed by rail to the Kiev region. The corps was originally to support the 19th Army and was assigned to it on 30 June. The corps was slow in deploying forward from Kharkov. As a result, the 23rd Mechanized Corps supported the 19th Army instead. During the first half of July, it was assigned to support the 21st Army to replace the mechanized corps destroyed in the border battles. Between 3 and 8 July the corps moved to the Novozybkov region. The corps included 163 older model tanks on 1 July (6 BT tanks and 157 T-26 tanks) and was reinforced by 64 T-34 medium tanks by 13 July. On 13 July, the corps was ordered to concentrate the 219th Motorized Division in the Rudnia, Borkhov, and Pribor region, 15 to 25 kilometers to the west of Gomel. The 50th Tank Division was to attack along the Bykhov and Bobruisk axis from its positions. 300 tanks of the corps launched heavy unsuccessful attacks in cooperation with the 67th Rifle Corps against Heinz Guderian's forces south of Bykhov.

On 16 July, the corps was in the Krichev area, according to Western Front commander Semyon Timoshenko. On 18 July, the 50th Tank Division was in the Voshchanka and Aleshnia region, 40 to 50 kilometers west of Rogachev and 15 to 20 kilometers east of Dovsk, according to Timoshenko's situation report. Its 10-tank detachment and a motorized company had reportedly destroyed 70-80 wheeled vehicles, 10 tanks, and killing up to 500 German soldiers in the Mahsevskaya Sloboda region from 17 July. The 219th Motorized Division was in the Chechersk and Voronovka area. The 55th Tank Division was at Novozybkov. According to Timoshenko's 21 July report, the corps was attacking. The 50th Tank Division was on the southern outskirts of Obidovichi, the 219th Motorized Division was unsuccessfully attempting to capture Maly Propoysk with its motor rifle regiment, and the 55th Tank Division was still at Novozybkov. On 22 July the corps was ordered to capture Propoysk. On 23 July it was fighting for Propoysk. The corps suffered heavy losses in its attacks and regrouped on 24 July. Between 25 and 27 July it resumed the offensive. The corps shifted back to defense on 31 July. On 10 August, the 55th Tank Division became the 8th and 14th Separate Tank Battalions. On 14 August a Stavka directive ordered the corps command and control units along with those of the 20th Rifle Corps to form the Bryansk Front headquarters.
