= Zhdanovsky Island =

Peninsula on the Karelian Isthmus, Finland-Russia

Native name: Ждановский остров
- Interactive map of Zhdanovsky Island

Geography
- Location: Karelian Isthmus, Russia
- Coordinates: 60°49′50″N 29°17′3″E
- Adjacent to: Vuoksi River

Administration
- Russia

Zhdanovsky Island (Finnish: Kuparsaari; Russian: Ждановский остров) is a peninsula on the Karelian Isthmus, along the southern shore of Vuoksi River.
