= Mikhail Yefremov (military commander) =

Soviet military commander

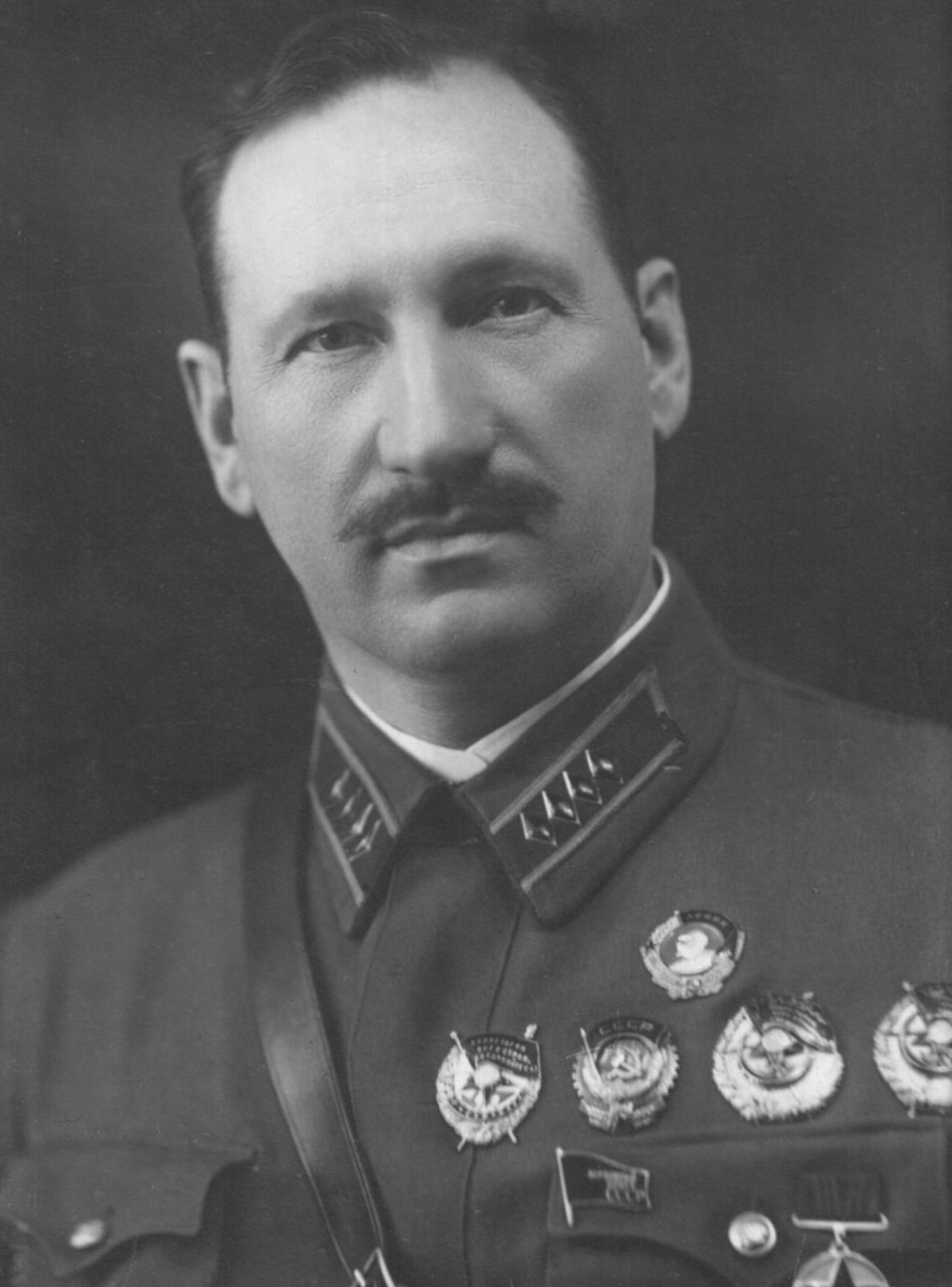

Lieutenant General Mikhail Grigoryevich Yefremov (Russian: Михаи́л Григо́рьевич Ефре́мов; March 11 1897, Tarusa, Kaluga Governorate – April 19 1942, Vyazemsky District) was a Soviet military commander. He took part in the October Revolution, joined the Russian Communist Party (b) in 1919, and became a division commander in 1921. He also became a military advisor to the National Government of China in 1928. During World War II, he commanded the Central Front in August 1941, and the Soviet 33rd Army from October 1941.

"Lt.-Gen. Yefremov decided to personally lead the striking force of his army" when Georgy Zhukov decided to take Vyazma in early February 1942. General Pavel Belov's Cavalry Corps was able to join them before the Germans cut them off from other advancing Soviet forces. Operating in the German rear next to Soviet partisans, they were supplied by air until April when they were given permission to link up with the main Soviet forces. Most of Gen. Belov's Cavalry Corps made it to the Soviet 10th Army. However, Yefremov decided to take a shorter route which was detected by the Germans. Subsequently, the 33rd army was destroyed and he committed suicide to avoid being taken prisoner by the Germans. "Most of his heroic men fell alongside him." Yefremov was awarded the Order of the Red Banner. A monument is dedicated to him in Vyazma.

== See also ==
- List of Heroes of the Russian Federation
