= 66th Rifle Corps =

- Allegiance: Soviet Union
- Branch: Soviet Red Army
- Engagements: Eastern Front (World War II); Operation Barbarossa

The 66th Rifle Corps was a corps of the Soviet Red Army. It was part of the 21st Army. It took part in the Great Patriotic War.

== Organization ==
- 61st Rifle Division
- 117th Rifle Division
- 154th Rifle Division

== Commanders ==
- Major General Fyodor Sudakov
