= 137th Rifle Division =

- Active: September 1939 – August 31, 1945
- Country: Soviet Union
- Branch: Red Army
- Type: Infantry
- Size: Division
- Engagements: Battle of Smolensk (1941); Roslavl–Novozybkov offensive Battle of Moscow; Voronezh–Kastornoye offensive Oryol offensive Battle of Kursk; Operation Kutuzov; Gomel-Rechytsa offensive Parichi-Bobruisk offensive Operation Bagration; Bobruysk offensive Minsk offensive Lublin-Brest offensive Vistula-Oder offensive East Prussian offensive Heiligenbeil Pocket
- Decorations: Order of Suvorov
- Battle honours: Bobruisk

Commanders
- Notable commanders: Maj. Gen. Sergei Evlampievich Danilov; Col. Ivan Tikhonovich Grishin; Col. Mikhail Grigorevich Volovich; Maj. Gen. Aleksei Ivanovich Alfyorov; Col. Sergei Mikhailovich Tarasov; Maj. Gen. Fyodor Nikitich Zhabrev; Col. Mikhail Pavlovich Serebrov

The 137th Rifle Division was formed as an infantry division of the Red Army in early September 1939 in the Moscow Military District, based on the shtat (table of organization and equipment) of September 13. At the start of the German invasion on June 22, 1941 it was still in that District under 20th Army and soon began moving by rail west toward Orsha where it was resubordinated to 13th Army of Western Front. By late August, much depleted after escaping encirclement, it was again moved, now to 3rd Army of Bryansk Front, defending near Trubchevsk. During Operation Typhoon it was deeply encircled but enough of a cadre was eventually able to escape that it was not disbanded, taking up positions east of Oryol. The division spent 1942 on this relative quiet front, gradually rebuilding, before taking part in the offensive that retook Kastornoye in January, 1943, after which it was transferred to 48th Army, where it remained for the duration of the war. Along with this Army it advanced toward Kursk and Oryol during February and March before being halted by German reinforcements and the spring thaw, setting the stage for the Battle of Kursk in July. 48th Army, now in Central Front, saw little direct action in this battle, but soon joined the Soviet offensive that finally took Oryol in early August. Following this victory the 137th advanced with its Army through eastern Ukraine into southeast Belarus, where it took part in battles in the waterlogged region of Gomel, Rechytsa, and Parychy through the winter of 1943-44. During the summer offensive in Belarus the division took part in the elimination of a large pocket of German 9th Army forces southeast of Babruysk, then the clearing of the city itself, and received its name as a battle honor. It then advanced through western Belarus toward Poland, helping to force crossings of the Narew River before the campaign ground to a halt. Prior to the start of the 1945 winter offensive the division was transferred with 48th Army to 2nd Belorussian Front, and fought through East Prussia to the Frisches Haff, helping to isolate the German forces around Königsberg, winning the Order of Suvorov in the process. During February and March, serving now under 3rd Belorussian Front, 48th Army was engaged in eliminating the pocket of German forces trapped southwest of that city, and two of the 137th's regiments were also decorated for this service. This was rather meagre recognition, a fact not lost on the division's personnel. However, they were soon homeward bound, and the division was disbanded at the end of August.

== Formation ==
The division was organized at Gorkiy in the Moscow Military District in September 1939, based on a cadre from the 51st Rifle Regiment of the 17th Rifle Division, as part of the major pre-World War II mobilization of the Red Army. Kombrig Sergei Evlampievich Danilov was appointed as commander on the day it formed; this officer had been serving as an instructor at the Frunze Military Academy and would have his rank modernized to major general on June 4, 1940. He was succeeded on October 25 by Col. Ivan Tikhonovich Grishin. During this time the division was serving as a garrison unit at Gorkiy. On June 22, 1941, its order of battle was as follows:

- 409th Rifle Regiment
- 624th Rifle Regiment
- 771st Rifle Regiment
- 278th Light Artillery Regiment
- 497th Howitzer Regiment
- 169th Sapper Battalion
- 238th Antitank Battalion
- 176th Reconnaissance Company
- 162nd Sapper Battalion
- 246th Signal Battalion (later 122nd Signal Company)
- 179th Medical/Sanitation Battalion
- 142nd Chemical Defense (Anti-gas) Company
- 81st Motor Transport Company (later 198th Battalion)
- 162nd Field Bakery
- 26th Divisional Veterinary Hospital
- 85th Field Postal Station
- 371st Field Office of the State Bank

On June 25, the division was subordinated to 20th Army's 20th Rifle Corps, part of the Group of Armies of the STAVKA Reserve. Beginning on June 26, the division was transferred to Orsha. The first trains carrying men of the 771st Rifle Regiment arrived there on June 29. At the beginning of July, the division was subordinated to the 13th Army. The division was also transferred to the 61st Rifle Corps. It held positions at Ponizova (south of Orsha) and on the Dniepr, a front of 20 kilometers. On July 5, the division's 176th Reconnaissance Company, operating in advance of the division at Barysaw, was heavily assaulted by German tanks and withdrew to the Dniepr. On July 8, the division was ordered to move east and hold positions on the Resta River. However, the division at this point had only the 771st Rifle Regiment, elements of the 624th Rifle Regiment and the two artillery regiments actually at the front; the transports of the 409th Rifle Regiment and the remainder of the 624th were still approaching Krychaw, and later joined the 7th Airborne Brigade (4th Airborne Corps). The division's antiaircraft artillery battalion was heavily bombed by German aircraft and ceased to exist as an effective combat unit. The medical battalion reached Roslavl and was attached to a different unit.

== Battle of Smolensk ==
On July 10, elements of the 2nd Panzer Group crossed the Dniepr and seized a bridgehead. The 137th was ordered to counterattack and eliminate this lodgement. On July 11, the division began the march westward to the line of Dubrovka, Volkovichi and Usushek, during which time it was resubordinated to the 45th Rifle Corps. By July 13, the division was at the starting line for the attack. The immediate objective was to capture Seredyna-Buda, Pustoy Osovets, Chervonny Osovets and Davidovichi. On the right flank, the 132nd Rifle Division was also attacking as the 148th Rifle Division moved forward on the 137th's left. The German troops repulsed the division's attack and soon moved forward themselves. The 771st Rifle Regiment had captured Chervonny Osovets, but was forced to retreat under pressure from German tanks. The division did not retreat beyond its jumping-off line but was bypassed on the flanks by German armor.

After six weeks of heavy fighting around Smolensk, the 137th was reduced to the equivalent of only two or three rifle battalions. A report by Lt. Gen. K. D. Golubev, commander of 13th Army, on the same date, states that the 137th had been relieved by the 282nd Rifle Division before being pulled back to Army reserve, and implies that the 137th, along with three other rifle divisions, had barely escaped encirclement by running a gauntlet eastward through the advancing forces of the German XXIV Motorized Corps and therefore were in no shape to continue active operations. 13th Army was now part of the new Bryansk Front. On August 23 the commander of the Front, Lt. Gen. A. I. Yeryomenko, tasked Golubev with defending the Pochep area, which he saw as key to retaining Bryansk, as well as retaking Starodub. Two days later he effectively created a new 3rd Army, under command of Maj. Gen. Ya. G. Kreizer, through a series of transfers, one of which was the 137th. Effective at midnight on August 28 this Army was to take up positions between 13th and 50th Armies.

=== Roslavl-Novozybkov Offensive ===
The specific assignment for Colonel Grishin was to:

occupy the bridgehead at Trubchevsk by the morning of 27 August and defend it against attack from Pochep, while protecting the crossings over the Desna River.

What remained of the division, described as a "composite battalion" on August 29, was now in the Army's third line of defense. At this time 2nd Panzer Group, under Gen. H. Guderian, was maneuvering for jumping off positions for a drive south to encircle Southwestern Front. The STAVKA, still not grasping the significance of Guderian's moves, demanded that Yeryomenko join in on a general counteroffensive by Western and Reserve Fronts set for August 30 and September 1. In his first orders only 13th Army would be involved, but on the morning of August 30 the STAVKA complicated the situation by ordering all of his Front take part. Specifically, the 3rd Army was to:

...attack from the Lipki, Vitovka, and Semtsy front [10-20km south of Pochep] toward Starodub and Novozybkov with at least two RDs with tanks, smash the enemy's mobile grouping in the Starodub, Novgorod-Severskii, and Trubchevsk region, together with 13th Army, and reach the Klimovichi and Belaya Dubrovka front by 15 September.

This was utterly unrealistic given the Front's inadequate forces, and Guderian's presence in their midst. At this time 3rd Army had five rifle divisions in various states of repair, one cavalry division, one tank division and a tank brigades, plus a separate tank battalion. Meanwhile, a 20km-wide gap separated his Front and Central Front's 21st Army. Yeryomenko issued his orders to Kreizer to comply with Moscow's demands, but the 137th was in no position to take part in the shock group. The Front reported on August 30 that the division, as "a composite battalion", continued to guard the approaches to Trubchevsk.

The offensive began on September 2. By September 3 the division's strength was reported as "one regiment [the 771st], with its remaining forces and headquarters", still in the same positions. On the same day a counterattack by 18th Panzer Division forced the 282nd Division back to within 3km of the 137th's defenses. Ordered into an attack against elements of 17th Panzer Division on September 5 the remnants of the division made no gains and, in fact, ended up ceding ground. Overnight on September 6/7 Kreizer restored order among his troops, and the 137th was reported as being on a line from some 6km north to 6km west of Trubchevsk, having captured four German mortars and a pair of automatic weapons. On September 7, an attack by a German motorized regiment with tanks was beaten off, and the division pushed forward as much as 4km. The next day Yeryomenko reported that 3rd Army was fortifying its positions and beating off local attacks on its right wing. By now it was apparent that Bryansk Front had shot its bolt, and while the STAVKA persisted in ordering attacks as late as September 12 a disaster loomed to the south. On September 16 the 2nd and 1st Panzer Groups officially linked up south of Lokhvytsia, and Southwestern Front was encircled.

== Operation Typhoon ==
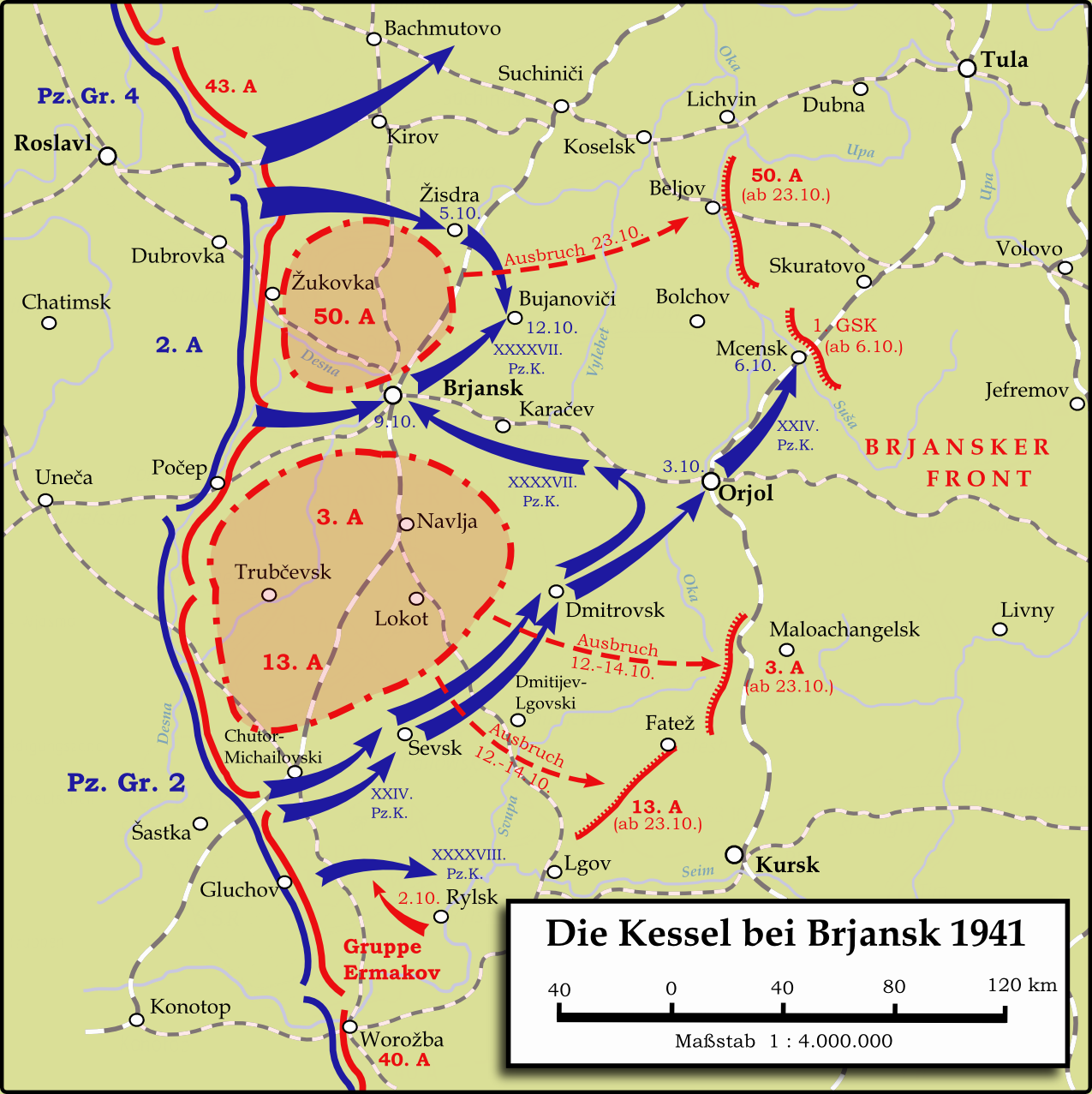
Bryansk encirclement, October 1941. Note position of 3rd Army.

The division continued to hold in these positions until late September. Once the Kyiv pocket was eliminated it was obvious that German attentions would again be directed at Moscow. Bryansk Front's counterattacks had weakened its armies to an extent that can be seen in Kreizer's report to Yeryomenko on September 29. He stated the 3rd Army was deployed on a front of 68km with just five rifle divisions, most of which were deficient in artillery and mortars. The 137th was the only one with a reasonable strength in this arm, but could not be withdrawn to form a reserve without fatally weakening the line.

2nd Panzer Group struck on September 30 south of 13th Army, while 2nd Army attacked toward Bryansk on October 2, cutting between 3rd and 50th Armies. Orders came from the STAVKA, likely directly from Stalin, for Yeryomenko the same day:

The Stavka demands no later than the morning of the 3rd to go on the offensive; launch a concentrated blow. Don't strike with an opened palm.
A) With the forces of the 307th and 6th Rifle Divisions, and if possible the 137th Rifle Division [attack] from the woods north of Seredina-Buda in the direction of Khutor-Mikhailovskii and Svessa...
It has been ordered to inform you that it is necessary to destroy the enemy at whatever the cost and chase him back beyond our front line.

This was followed by a phone call from the chief of the General Staff, Marshal B. M. Shaposhnikov, to Col. I. A. Dolgov of the Bryansk Front staff, asking if he was aware of the situation and emphasizing the necessity of adding the 137th to the attack. In the event this attack did nothing to change the situation.

Trubchevsk was finally given up on October 9. By October 12, Yeryomenko was attempting to get out of encirclement with several of Kreizer's units in a night attack and eventually succeeded, but Kreizer's headquarters lost contact with most of the rest of his forces. During October 17-20 the 137th and 269th Rifle Divisions, along with 42nd Tank Brigade, the Army commander, and his staff remained in complete encirclement 20km north of Dmitrovsk-Orlovskii. The 269th headquarters and artillery came under heavy air attacks, and the grouping's motor transport became stuck in the swampy terrain while the tanks ran out of fuel, despite efforts at air supply. The decision was taken to destroy heavy equipment and weapons and attempt to slip through German lines. On October 19 Luftwaffe reconnaissance reported that two Soviet groups, each of about divisional size, had been spotted, with further columns approaching from the southwest. Fighting took place in difficult terrain until on October 21 elements of 3rd Army penetrated the German front, having crossed an entire swamp, before slipping across the Fatezh–Kromy highway to friendly territory near Ponyri two nights later. Yeryomenko claimed that about 13,000 men of 3rd Army managed to escape.

=== Service in 1942 ===
The army managed to stabilize its positions between Mikhaylov and Yelets by late November, before beginning the counteroffensive against the southern flank of Army Group Center on December 6. The counteroffensive ended in late winter with the 137th and its army well to the east of Oryol; it would hold these positions for nearly a year. General Grishin left the division on March 17, 1942, having recently been appointed chief of staff of 50th Army. He would go on to lead 49th Army into peacetime, being made a Hero of the Soviet Union on April 10, 1945, having already reached the rank of colonel general. He was replaced by Col. Aleksei Viktorovich Vladimirskii, who had previously been serving as 3rd Army's deputy chief of staff. In April he lost important documents in combat near Mtsensk and was relieved of command, being moved to deputy command of the 287th Rifle Division. His successor, Lt. Col. Vasilii Andreevich Konovalov, was appointed on May 12, but was in turn replaced on June 17 by Col. Mikhail Grigorevich Volovich.

== Voronezh–Kastornoye Offensive ==
At the start of 1943 the 137th was still in 3rd Army, but later in January it was moved to direct command of Bryansk Front. By this time it was clear that a massive victory was about to be won at Stalingrad, and the STAVKA set about planning to expand this success on other fronts. By January 20 Bryansk Front, now under command of Lt. Gen. M. A. Reyter, and consisting of 3rd, 13th, and 48th Armies, plus 15th Air Army, was on a line from Bolshye Golubochki to Novosil to Gremyachaya to Kozinka. 13th Army, now with seven rifle divisions, formed the Front's left wing, on a 100km-wide zone from Sidorovka to Kozinka. It had been defending along this line since the previous July, hanging over the Axis forces in the area of Voronezh–Kastornoye.

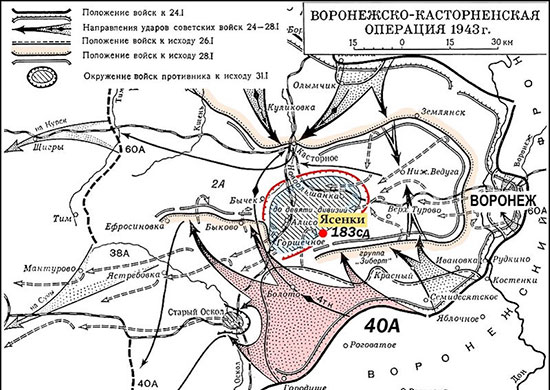
Voronezh–Kastornoye Offensive. 13th Army attacked from the north.

Bryansk Front's offensive toward Kastornoye was set for January 26. This joint operation with Voronezh Front targeted the German 2nd and Hungarian 2nd Armies. 13th Army, under command of Lt. Gen. N. P. Pukhov, was to break through along an 18km-wide sector between the Kshen and Olym rivers with a shock group of all seven rifle divisions. There were three divisions in second echelon, as well as a mobile group consisting of the 129th Tank Brigade, two aerosan battalions, plus a mortar and an antitank regiment. The second echelon divisions were, upon the arrival of the first echelon divisions in the area Volochik–Nizhne-Bolshoe–Vysshee-Bolshoe, to develop the offensive to the west and southwest to create an external encirclement front. Meanwhile, the 137th and 6th Guards Rifle Divisions, plus the 19th Tank Corps, would form Reyter's reserve, concentrated in the 13th Army sector.

The offensive opened at 0808 hours with a 65-minute artillery preparation, totaling 30 minutes of fire onslaughts and 35 minutes of aimed fire, altogether to a depth of 7-8km. Air attacks began at 0855. This preparation failed to suppress the defense completely and German fire from small arms and antitank guns from strongpoints particularly affected the shock group's flanks. During the opening day the main body of the first echelon broke through the German defense and advanced up to 8km in depth but was unable to develop this success. The next day the strongpoints at Lomigory and Mishino continued to hold out. After an outflanking movement the German forces abandoned both places overnight on January 27/28 and retreated to the south. At the same time, Reyter brought up his reserve force to the breakthrough sector, to be committed as circumstances required. Later in the day a pursuit took the attackers to a defense line from Volovchik to Volovo to Lipovchik. This covered the northern approaches to Kastornoye, and offered stubborn resistance. To take it, Pukhov decided to commit the 129th Tanks which, despite air attacks and deep snow, broke into Volovo, followed up by these divisions to take the entire line. Meanwhile, the second echelon had advanced to the Turchanovo–Zamaraika–Kshen line in readiness to develop the attack to the west. By now the Army had penetrated to a depth of 20km through a 25km-wide gap and routed the main forces of the German 82nd Infantry Division, creating an immediate threat to Kastornoye from the north.

On January 28, while the first echelon fought for Kastornoye, the second echelon divisions and reserve began their drive from the Kshen River to the west, facing the 383rd Infantry Division. By day's end they had begun to develop the offensive toward the Tim River. At the end of the day the 13th and 38th Armies, plus elements of 40th Army, had linked up, and the main escape routes of Axis Voronezh-Kastornoye grouping had been cut. 4th Panzer Division was moving from the Oryol area but was just beginning to arrive near Kursk. The latter was the new objective of Bryansk Front's left wing forces. After capturing several villages on February 3, the 137th reached a line between Novofedorovka and Pavlovka, operating in cooperation with the 143rd Rifle Division. By this time the division had been reassigned to 48th Army, commanded by Lt. Gen. P. L. Romanenko; it would remain in this army for the duration, apart from a brief reassignment to Western Front in April 1944.

=== Oryol Offensive ===
Bryansk Front continued advancing to the north and northwest on February 5. 48th Army was running into increasing fire resistance; nevertheless the 137th, 143rd, and 73rd Rifle Divisions had cleared a number of settlements, capturing Krasnyi Pakhar, Nepochataya, Nikolskoe 2, Shalimovo 1 and 2, and Kishevka while currently fighting for Enino 1 and Kriukovo. At this time the forces of the re-created Central Front were beginning to arrive, some of them all the way from Stalingrad, and on February 8 units of 60th Army liberated Kursk. By February 9, 48th and 13th Armies were splitting German 2nd Army and 2nd Panzer Army apart; the 137th had taken the southwestern outskirts of Smirnye. The offensive slowed in late February due to German forces being evacuated from the Rzhev salient, as well as lax practices on the part of lower-level commands. On February 17, Bryansk Front reported about the 48th Army operations east of Maloarkhangelsk, admonishing lower level headquarters against concentrating in the relative warmth and comfort of villages:

On 11–12 February, the headquarters of 137th Rifle Division, the headquarters of the 12th Artillery Division, and the headquarters of a guards-mortar regiment gathered in the village of Markino... On 12 February enemy aircraft bombed the village of Markino... We had intolerable losses in men and equipment.

An important victory was scored on February 23, when elements of 13th Army took Maloarkhangelsk, pushing the German forces back to the Neruch River. Two days later the 137th was included in an attack group to break this strong line, but was instead forced to repel counterattacks by tanks and infantry. On March 6 the division was combined with the 143rd to form a shock group, supported by the 28th and 30th Guards Tank Regiments, in a supporting attack along the Pokrovskoe–Oryol road against the 216th Infantry Division. All of Reiter's divisions were now down to 3,000-4,500 personnel each. The push began on March 6, but made no impression on the German defenses at the cost of heavy casualties. By March 11 the Front's forces were reduced to conducting reconnaissance and fending off German patrols. By now the counteroffensive by Army Group South was well underway and this, plus the upcoming spring rasputitsa, brought further offensive activity to a halt.

== Battle of Kursk ==
Later in March the 48th Army was reassigned to Army Gen. K.K. Rokossovskii's Central Front, forming its right flank. At the start of the Kursk offensive on July 5 the reinforced 48th was holding a front line sector 38km wide from the boundary with Bryansk Front to Droskovo–Stepanishchevo. Romanenko had deployed three divisions (73rd, 143rd, 16th Lithuanian) in first echelon and his remaining four (137th, 170th, 399th, 202nd) in second echelon within the second defensive zone. The 2nd Antitank Brigade was in Army reserve, concentrated in the area of Vorovo and Vyazovoi. There were three regiments of tanks deployed behind the Army's left flank between the second and rear defense zones, and the 1168th Cannon Artillery Regiment plus three self-propelled artillery regiments were also in support. Romanenko had his headquarters at Perekhozhee. While the possibility of the main German attack from the north striking 48th Army was anticipated it was considered more likely to come against 13th Army to its left. In the event the assault by German 9th Army followed the more likely path and 48th Army played little role in the defensive battle. By July 15 the German forces had been fought to a standstill and the 48th, 13th, 70th, and 2nd Tank Armies were prepared to go over to the counteroffensive against the German 9th Army in the Oryol salient.

=== Operation Kutuzov ===
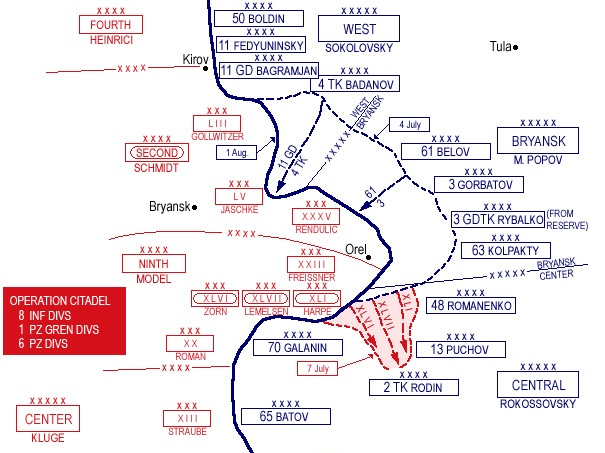
Map of Operation Kutuzov. Note position of 48th Army.

48th Army was ordered to attack with its left flank 42nd Rifle Corps (16th Lithuanian, 399th, 137th) along the sector Sondrovka–outside Krasnaya Slobodka in the direction of Yasnaya Polyana and Shamshin and by the end of July 17 to reach a line from Nagornyi to Shamshin, after which it was to develop the offensive toward Zmiyovka. At 0600 hours on July 15, following a 15-minute artillery fire onslaught, Central Front went over to the attack. Despite stubborn resistance, by 0800 Soviet forces had penetrated up to 2–3km on some sectors; 42nd Corps made considerable progress toward Kunach. The advance continued over the next week despite the defenders making good use of terrain and pre-existing defenses and after forcing the Neruch River on July 22 the right flank forces of 48th Army liberated the town of Bogodukhov on July 24 while its center and left flank reached a line from Glazunovka to Gremyachevo. Following this the Army sped up its advance to the northwest from the line of the Zmievka–Ponyri railroad. At about this time the 137th left 42nd Corps and returned to direct Army command.

By this time Oryol was in danger of being encircled by the forces of Central and Bryansk Fronts and 9th Army was making preparations to evacuate it even as resistance at the front remained stubborn. Romanenko now ordered his Army in the general direction of Nesterovo and in an energetic advance it covered more than 60km by August 1, reaching a line from Ploskoe to Gutorovo and capturing both villages. On August 3, German sappers began demolition work within the city. The following morning elements of 63rd Army broke into Oryol and street fighting began; this continued until dawn on August 5. 9th Army now began falling back to the west to take up positions at the base of the diminishing salient. The right wing forces of 48th Army took Kromy on August 6 and five days later reached a line from Mytskoe to outside Dmitrovsk-Orlovsky. By August 18 the Soviet forces reached the Hagen position and the Oryol salient had been cleared. Colonel Volovich left the 137th on August 29, being replaced by his deputy commander, Col. Aleksei Ivanovich Alfyorov. This officer would be promoted to major general on September 15.

== Into Ukraine and Belarus ==
Central Front struck German 2nd Army's center at Sevsk and east flank at Klintsy on August 26. The Front's forces quickly broke the German line with 60th Army in the lead. On September 2 the XIII Army Corps was ordered to fall back to the west and maintain contact with Army Group South, but instead was pushed south across the Seym River into the 4th Panzer Army sector, thereby opening a 30km wide gap between Army Groups South and Center. The following day, 2nd Army withdrew to the Desna River as Rokossovskii paused to regroup. On September 9 the Front's forces forced this river south of Novhorod-Siverskyi and at Otsekin. Central Front liberated Nizhyn on the Oster River on September 15, which finally triggered the OKH to order a full withdrawal to the Dniepr. Over the next five days the Front staged a two-pronged thrust northward on either side of Chernihiv which collapsed the flank of 2nd Army, allowing it to advance north toward Gomel.

=== Gomel-Rechytsa Offensive ===
48th Army closed up to the German defenses at Gomel from the east and south on September 29–30. Romanenko arrayed his five divisions under direct Army command in an arc extending from Dobrush along the Iput River for some 25km to where it entered the Sozh River. The Army largely faced the XXXV Army Corps. During the first two weeks of October, Rokossovskii launched his first attempt to seize Gomel and advance on Rechytsa, but this was unsuccessful. For the second attempt he called for the formation of three shock groups on Central Front's right wing (48th, 65th and 61st Armies). These were to attack on October 15 in the direction of Babruysk and Minsk. The first of these included seven divisions from 48th Army and four from 65th Army. Three divisions (102nd, 194th, and 307th), were moved into a bridgehead over the Sozh south of Gomel while the 170th, 137th and 175th took over their former sectors. In the event, this effort made little more progress than the first attempt. On October 20, Central Front was redesignated as Belorussian Front.

Rokossovskii planned for a renewed offensive to begin on November 10. Over the first ten days of the month the Front carried out another regrouping to continue the offensive and encircle and destroy the German Rechytsa-Gomel grouping. He ordered the 175th, 102nd and 73rd Divisions into the bridgehead between the Dniepr and Sozh while the 42nd Corps was moved to a bridgehead over the Dniepr south of Loyew where it was backed up by the 137th and 170th as a second echelon. In three days of fighting the forces of 48th and 65th Armies managed to tear a gap 15km wide and from 8–12km deep in the German defenses, and were halfway to Rechytsa. Over the next four days XXXV Corps was driven back into the city, and on November 18 the German forces evacuated it, crossing to the east bank of the Dniepr. Army Group Center's southern defenses were in a state of crisis by this point, and 9th Army had been forced out of Gomel. Along with a small group from 1st Guards Tank Corps the 48th joined the advance of 11th and 63rd Armies, which were pursuing the XXXV Corps as it withdrew from Gomel. By November 30 the combined armies had pushed the Corps westward and northwestward to the Klenovichi–Potapovka line, 25km southeast of Zhlobin.

General Alfyorov was severely wounded on December 19 and hospitalized; he would not see further service at the front. On December 24 he was replaced by Col. Nikolai Vasilevich Smirnov, who had served mainly in the training establishment earlier in the war. At about the same time the division was subordinated to the 29th Rifle Corps, along with the 102nd and 307th. At around this time the division, by order of the front command, formed a separate submachine gun battalion for "assault and... counterattack duties". This unit was organized as follows:

- 2 submachine gun companies (110 men each)
- 1 mortar company (9 82mm mortars)
- 1 light machine gun platoon (24 men, 8 LMGs)
- 1 reconnaissance platoon (armed with SMGs)
- 1 antiaircraft platoon (4 AAMGs)
- 1 antitank platoon (9 ATRs)

This battalion was formed from experienced "young men... from 19 to 33 years old", and was placed under command of the 771st Rifle Regiment. During the winter of 1943-44 the division also formed its own ski battalion, but this was disbanded at the end of the winter.

=== Parichi-Bobruisk Offensive ===
For Rokossovskii's next attempt to reach Parychy and Babruysk General Romanenko formed a shock group with his 42nd and 29th Corps with armor support which was to launch its attack in the 15km-wide sector from Shatsilki on the Berezina southwest to Zherd Station on the Shatsilki–Kalinkavichy rail line, facing elements of XXXXI Panzer Corps. This was to begin on January 16, 1944, and was to reach a line from Oktyabirskii to Parychy by the end of the month, after which 48th and 65th Armies were to exploit to Babruysk. 29th Corps was deployed in a two-echelon formation due west of Shatsilki in order to quickly punch through the defenses of the 253rd Infantry Division. Its immediate objectives was the village of Chirkovichi and then drive across the Zherdianka River with reinforcement of the 217th Rifle Division from Army reserve.

From the beginning the 194th and 175th struggled to penetrate the German forward defenses. By dusk on January 19 the 137th and 102nd pierced the defenses of the 253rd and 36th Infantry Divisions, advanced nearly 3km, crossed the Zherdianka on the right wing of the 253rd, and reached a pair of strongpoints 2-3km west and northwest of Shatsilki, cutting the road between that place and Parychy. Romanenko now committed the 217th to clear Shatsilki itself. Early the next day, 29th Corps struck the left flank and rear of 36th Infantry at Pechishche, but this did not directly involve the 137th. On January 21 a total of four rifle divisions, including the 137th, pressed the German defenses at Shatsilki and, under threat of encirclement, the 253rd evacuated the place, withdrawing to the Repishche region to the west. On the same day Colonel Smirnov left his command, moving back to the Front reserves. He would later briefly hold other divisional commands but ended the war as military commandant of Poznań. Col. Sergei Mikhailovich Tarasov, Smirnov's chief of staff, took over; this NKVD officer had previously led the 162nd Rifle Division without distinction.

Over the next two days the 29th Corps was concentrated on a 4km-wide sector from Repishche east to Rudnia, with orders to attack northward toward Chirkovichi and Molcha early on January 24. This assault caught the German forces on the back foot as they were preparing new defenses. In four more days of combat the 307th took Repishche, then moved on with the 137th on the right and the 73rd on the left to force the center and right of the 253rd Infantry back 2km to the Chirka River and the southern approaches to Chirkovichi and Molcha. At this point the German division was finally able to halt. By this point 48th Army's divisions were completely fatugued and incapable of continuing without reinforcements. Rokossovskii approved a halt on January 27, with directions to renew the offensive on February 2. During this pause the 137th was moved back to 42nd Corps, where it would remain for the duration.

Rokossovskii intended 48th Army, which had been heavily reinforced and would be supported on the left by 65th Army's 95th Rifle Corps, to smash the defenses of 9th Army in the Dubrova area and advance northwest in the direction of Parychy and Babruysk. The Army's shock group would consist of the 25th and 53rd Rifle Corps and these would assault the positions of 36th and 134th Infantry Divisions. Once the penetration was achieved the 1st Guards Tank Corps would be introduced to lead the exploitation and, if necessary, the 170th Division and 42nd Corps. Dubrova was cleared by 96th Rifle Division on the first day and the advance covered some 4km by February 5, but came under repeated counterattacks by infantry and tanks and Romanenko was ordered to go over to the defense the next day. It was renewed on February 14; again the attackers made initial gains of about 2km before being halted by reinforcements. Romanenko's next effort took place east and west of Iazvin beginning on February 22. He concentrated 42nd and 29th Corps backed by elements of 1st Guards Tanks. This amounted to eight understrength divisions supported by roughly 70 tanks, which penetrated the defense and pushed forward some 4km to the northwest; in three more days of heavy fighting another 5km were gained. The battle died out by February 25 due to mutual exhaustion. Belorussian Front was renamed 1st Belorussian during this month.

In the last week of March Rokossovskii set out to eliminate the remaining German bridgeheads on the east bank of the Dniepr. One of these was held by elements of 9th Army between Bykhaw and Chavusy and was to be attacked by the Front's 10th and 50th Armies, backed by 1st Guards Tanks, starting on March 25. In preparation for this ambitious offensive 42nd Corps was transferred to the 50th. This Army was to penetrate the defenses of German 4th Army's XII Army Corps on a 10km-wide front east of Bykhaw. The shock group would consist of the 121st Rifle Corps and part of 46th Rifle Corps with the objective of reaching the southern approaches of Mogilev by the end of April 1. 42nd Corps was to reinforce this exploitation once it completed its redeployment around March 30. In the event, in five days of heavy fighting the shock group managed to gain only 3km at the most, and 42nd Corps could do little to help.

Colonel Tarasov was relieved of his command on April 2 for "failure to complete a combat mission", but he was soon appointed to lead the 110th Rifle Division which he led successfully for the duration. Maj. Gen. Fyodor Nikitich Zhabrev took over the 137th from his post of deputy commander of the 42nd Corps. In mid-April 1st Belorussian Front went over to the defense to prepare for the summer offensive. At about the same time the 137th and its Corps was transferred to 3rd Army, still in the same Front, but returned to 48th Army prior to the start of the summer offensive.

== Operation Bagration ==
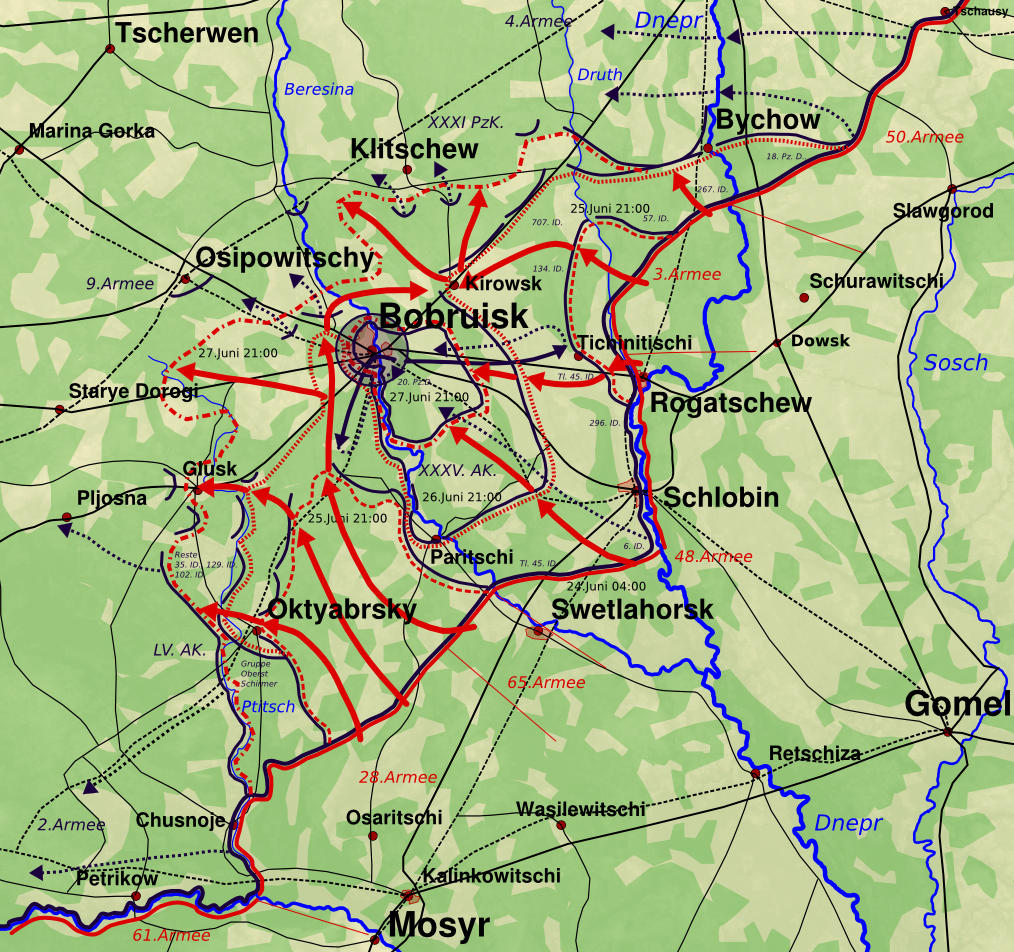
Babruysk operation. Note thrust of 48th Army's shock group north of Rahachow.

At the start of the offensive 42nd Corps (137th, 170th, 399th Divisions) was concentrated north of Rahachow to form 48th Army's shock group with 29th Corps, heavily backed by artillery and armor. The 7km-wide attack sector ran from Kostyashevo to Kolosy. 42nd Corps specifically was to attack on a 1,000m front just north of the former and develop its attack in the direction of Koshary, and was tasked with capturing bridgeheads on the west bank of the Dobysna River, using forward detachments, by the end of the second day. The shock group would then advance in the direction of Repki, Turki, and Babruysk, complete breaking the German defense, and then reach the rear of the three divisions in and around Zhlobin, cut them off from the crossings of the Berezina, and destroy them in cooperation with 65th Army. At the same time, the Army would seize crossings south of Babruysk and take the city with an attack from the south. Following this the offensive would be developed in the direction of Asipovichy and Pukhavichy. Romanenko deployed his Army in a single echelon. The Front's artillery preparation would last two hours and five minutes, and 42nd Corps would have support from the 22nd Breakthrough Artillery Division.

=== Babruysk Offensive ===
In the last days before the offensive a reconnaissance in force was carried out along the entire Front's 761km sector, even though its left wing armies would not be initially involved. The right wing armies, including the 48th, made their reconnaissance on the night of June 22/23 with 12 detachments roughly the size of a reinforced rifle battalion, although that of the 48th also contained two penal companies. This attacked following a 10-minute artillery preparation but had no success in seizing German positions, which were being stubbornly held. The main artillery preparation on the morning of June 24 was relatively ineffective on the breakthrough sector of the 48th and 3rd Armies, largely due to the distance from the firing positions to the forward defenses, 5–6km or more. As well, poor weather limited air support. The shock groups of the two Armies attempted to break the defense on a 15km sector from Ozerane to Kolosy. 42nd and 29th Corps had great difficulty in developing the offensive in part due to terrain; the broad and swampy valley of the Drut River was difficult to cross, especially by tanks and other heavy vehicles. Accurate German artillery and mortar fire on the approaches to the crossing points also caused trouble. Only after two hours of heavy fighting was the river line forced and the first trench line taken. The second line was captured by 1100 hours and the battle moved on to the third line, continuing without success until evening. Altogether, the two shock groups had penetrated 2.5–3.5km on a 20km front.

The offensive continued the next morning with a 45-minute artillery preparation, now supported by aviation, before the shock group went over to the attack at 1000 hours. Intensive fighting continued through the day, finally clearing the main defensive zone before closing up to the second zone, completing an advance of 5-10km. Getting the artillery over the Drut caused considerable delay. June 26 saw the completion of the breakthrough as 3rd and 48th Armies cleared the final defensive line. At 0400 hours, following a short but powerful preparation, the latter resumed the attack and by 1300 had forced the Dniepr and captured Zhlobin, a linchpin of the defense. By 2000 the shock group had reached the German intermediate position along the Dobysna River and forced it off the march. In three days the shock group had advanced from 10-23km from its jumping-off positions. 46th Rifle and 9th Tank Corps were both committed from 3rd Army's reserve to exploit toward Babruysk and north of that place. Air reconnaissance revealed large columns of vehicles and equipment moving west.

During June 27 the 48th, 3rd and 65th Armies advanced without much opposition to both encircle Babruysk and eliminate the three isolated German divisions that had been in the Zhlobin–Rahachow area. Elements of the 48th were working in cooperation with the Dniepr Flotilla operating along the Berezina, and by the end of the day the Army it was fighting the encircled grouping on a line from Barak to outside Malinova to Kavali to Malevo. In the morning, mobile units of 65th Army cut all the roads from Babruysk to the west and northwest, while its 105th Rifle Corps cut the paved road to Hlusk and 1st Guards Tanks broke into the northern and northwestern outskirts. During the day the encircled grouping prepared for a breakout to the north as it had no prospect of reaching Babruysk; artillery and other equipment was destroyed, as were livestock and other supplies. At 1900 hours the pocket came under attack from 526 aircraft of 16th Air Army. The destruction caused by bombing and strafing led to panic, vehicle collisions, and massive traffic jams. At 2015, supported by armor and artillery, 48th Army went over to the attack along its entire front. While the German units closest to the front line, which had suffered less from the air assault, put up stiff resistance, other groups and individuals that had been more directly affected began to surrender. Rokossovskii entrusted Romanenko with the final liquidation of this grouping.

Fighting went on through the night of June 27/28 and the morning as the remaining organized German forces continued to attempt to break out to the north. The left flank forces of 3rd Army beat off 15 heavy attacks in up to divisional strength. Meanwhile, 48th Army was launching powerful concentric attacks with the 42nd Corps operating from the east toward Savichy as the 29th and 53rd Corps drove from the southeast toward Dubovka. During the night the pocket was split in two, and with all hope of escape gone German troops began surrendering in groups of 100-250 men, led by their officers. Only a small fraction attempted to evade captivity. By 1300 hours the fighting had effectively ceased; 48th Army reached the Berezina while leaving detachments to mop up.

=== Minsk Offensive ===
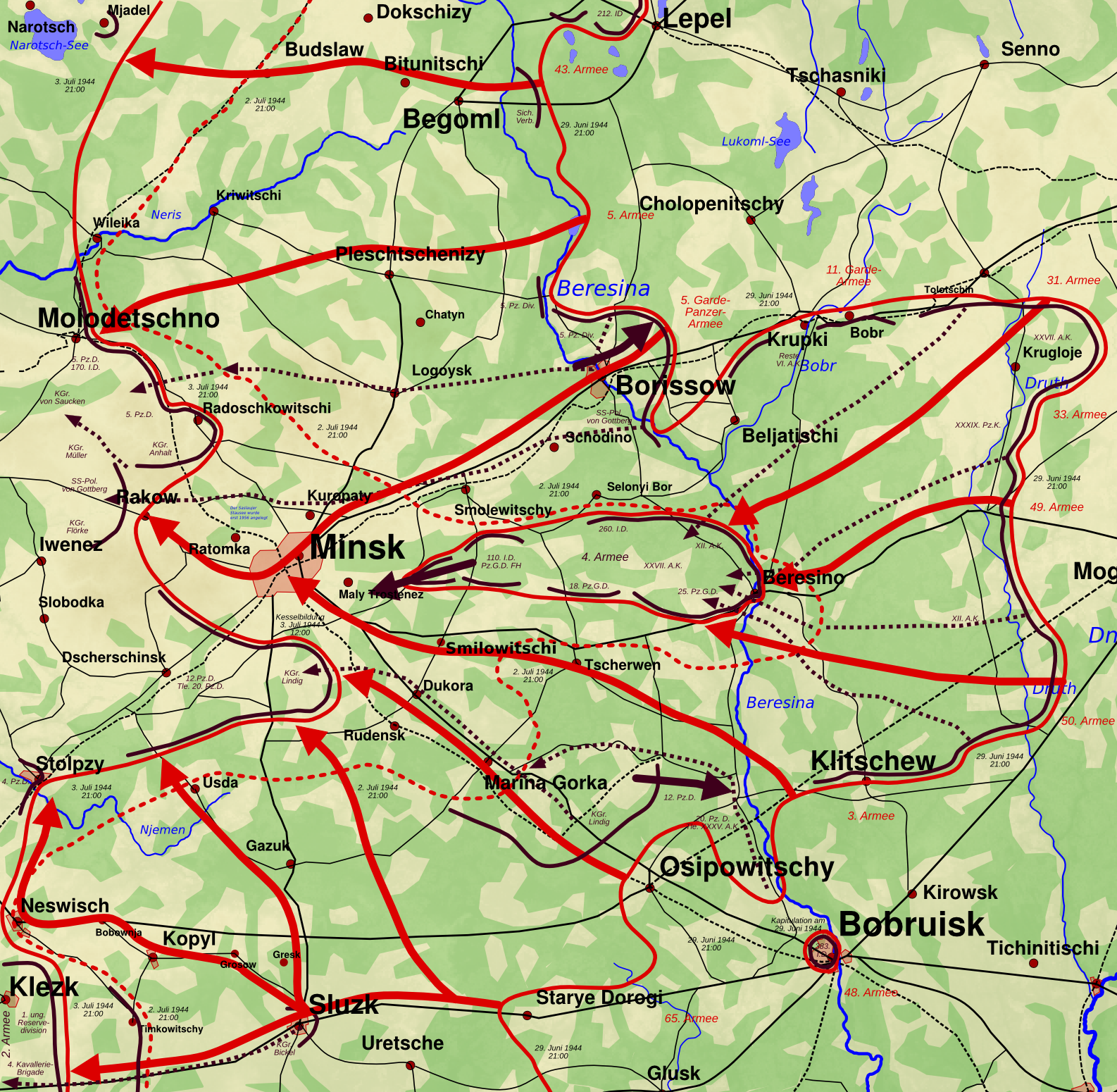
Minsk Offensive

Babruysk had a nominal garrison of 10,000 men but remnants of nearly every division of 9th Army had taken refuge there. Fighting was building by building and block by block, but overnight on June 28/29 the remaining defenders largely gathered in the north and northwest to attempt a breakout. This grouping managed to break through the defenses of 105th Corps' 356th Rifle Division with heavy losses, but the escapees were largely re-encircled later. By 1000 hours the lead divisions of 42nd Corps and 105th Corps met and completely captured the city. In all it took 42nd Corps, 105th Corps, and two corps of 3rd Army about three days to mop up all the escapees from Babruysk, which slowed the development of the offensive toward Minsk and Baranavichy. The 29th and 53rd Corps took up the pursuit toward Asipovichy and Pukhavichy, while 42nd Corps completed its part in the mopping up in the Solomenka area on July 1. In recognition of this victory the men and women of the division finally received a battle honor:

BOBRUYSK... 137th Rifle Division (Major General Zhabrev, Fyodor Nikitich)... The troops who participated in the liberation of Bobruysk, by the order of the Supreme High Command of 29 June 1944, and a commendation in Moscow, are given a salute of 20 artillery salvoes from 224 guns.

At 2300 hours on July 2, Rokossovskii issued an order to 1st Guards and 9th Tank Corps, and an hour later to 3rd and 48th Armies, to advance on a 24-hour basis to liberate Minsk. 1st Guards broke into the city's southeastern outskirts at 1300 on July 3 and linked up 3rd Belorussian Front's 2nd Guards Tank Corps, completing the encirclement. 48th Army supported this advance from the south. Now it was directed to reach the line Negoreloe–Logvishche–Mogilno–Nesvizh–Golynka by the end of July 4. This was a redirection from the northwest to the west. It was unable to fully reach this line due to swampy and forested terrain and poor roads.

=== Lublin-Brest Offensive ===
The right wing armies of 1st Belorussian Front (48th, 65th and 28th) were now given the task of developing the offensive to the southwest, in the direction of Baranavichy and Brest. The line from Slonim to Pinsk was to be taken no later than July 10-12 and the armies were to subsequently take Brest while also seizing bridgeheads on the west bank of the Western Bug River. The Front's left wing armies, largely inactive to this point, would join the offensive. By July 5 the remnants of organized German forces had fallen back to a defense line that had been constructed during WWI from Daugavpils to Maladzyechna to Baranavichy, but this was understandably in a poor state of repair. Under the favorable circumstances the Soviet forces carried on the operation without and real break. The German forces put up a stubborn defense of the latter place to cover the withdrawal of a grouping from Polesye. The attack by 48th and 65th Armies, backed by 4th Guards Cavalry and 1st Mechanized Corps, developed slowly and it wasn't until July 7 that they were able to break into the town following a powerful artillery and aviation preparation. Baranavichy was completely cleared the next day, and the Soviet forces occupied Luninyets on July 10, with Pinsk falling four days later.

On July 12 the 42nd Rifle Corps was released from second echelon and ran into sustained resistance from remnants of the 28th Jäger Division and 4th Panzer Division, defending a line along the western bank of the Zelvyanka. By July 20 the right flank armies of the Front had occupied Kobryn, were approaching the Western Bug and had outflanked Brest from the northeast. The Brest garrison had been ordered to hold at all costs, and a counterattack force had been gathered to retake Kobryn. The fighting with this grouping continued through July 23-27 before it was defeated and the river was reached. Brest was now enveloped on two sides, and it fell to combined forces of 28th, 61st and 70th Armies on July 28. The advance now shifted to the Warsaw axis as German resistance increased, and this, combined with logistic constraints, brought the offensive to a halt, generally along the line of the Vistula.

== Into Poland and East Prussia ==
In the first days of September the 137th closed up to the Narew River near the village of Kacice and attempted to seize a bridgehead. Sgt. Maj. Pyotr Trofimovich Odinets was in command of a 76mm cannon of the 17th Artillery Regiment, and among his crew was Sen. Sgt. Yakov Sergeevich Shumakov. The crew was the first that managed to get across, using improvised means. On September 4 the bridgehead was hit with heavy counterattacks by infantry and tanks. The crew was able to destroy two medium tanks before all but Odinets were disabled; Shumakov was acting as gunner when he was mortally wounded. Odinets himself was wounded in the head but remained serving the piece alone, accounting for another tank destroyed and two more disabled, as well as some 70 infantry. On November 18 both men would be made Heroes of the Soviet Union, Shumakov posthumously. Odinets attended the Poltava Military School after the war and worked up to the rank of captain before being moved to the reserve. He died on March 1, 1975, and was buried at Kostyantynivka, near Melitopol. With this fire support the bridgehead was held, but 48th Army soon went over to the defense. Later that month the Army was transferred from 1st to 2nd Belorussian Front.

On November 13, General Zhabrev was hospitalized with tuberculosis; he would not see further service at the front. He was replaced by Col. Bronislav Mikhailovich Petkevich until January 8, 1945, when he was in turn replaced by Col. Mikhail Pavlovich Serebrov. This officer had mostly served in airborne forces earlier in the war, and later led the 392nd Rifle Regiment of the 73rd Rifle Division. He would lead the 137th into peacetime. In November the personnel of the division were reported to be 90 percent Belorussian, with the remainder being Ukrainian.

In preparation for the Vistula-Oder offensive 48th Army was moved into the bridgehead over the Narew at Różan. It was tasked with launching the Front's main attack in conjunction with 2nd Shock Army on a 6km front with the immediate goal of reaching Mława. The Corps was deployed along the sector from the Army's right boundary line as far as the Orzyc River and had two divisions in the first echelon. The Corps had been reinforced with the 35th Howitzer Brigade, 16th Guards Howitzer Regiment, 18th Mortar Brigade (all of 15th Artillery Division), and the 286th Mortar Regiment.

=== Vistula-Oder Offensive ===
On the first day of the offensive, January 14, 1945, the Army's forces advanced 3-6km against stubborn resistance and reached the approaches to Maków, which was taken the next day. A further gain of up to 10km was made on January 16, aided by clearing weather which allowed greater air support. While 48th Army covered another 16km the following day, the 8th Mechanized Corps, which was exploiting through the Army's breakthrough, captured the outer ring of the Mława fortified area. On the 17th the 5th Guards Tank Army deployed southwest of Maków and before long passed through the combat formations of 53rd Corps and attacked the 7th and 299th Infantry Divisions from the march. These divisions had been reinforced with 20 tanks and assault guns and put up stiff resistance before their positions were broken through. The next day 5th Guards Tanks completed the blockade of Mława and by the evening elements of 48th Army reached its outskirts. The German garrison, consisting of remnants of the 7th and 299th Divisions and the 30th Panzergrenadier Regiment, contested the major brick structures and a series of concrete pillboxes, but despite this units of 42nd Corps soon broke into the town. Heavy fighting continued overnight and by morning the garrison had been destroyed with its remnants taken prisoner while the 29th Corps stormed the important road junction and strongpoint of Przasnysz, allowing Marshal Rokossovskii to commit his 3rd Guards Cavalry Corps.

The 48th and 2nd Shock Armies now took up the pursuit northward toward the Frisches Haff, advancing as much as 30km and reaching a line from Działdowo to Bieżuń by day's end. On January 26 the 29th and 53rd Corps were fighting along the approaches to Guttstadt and had captured Wormditt while the 42nd Corps assisted 5th Guards Tanks in capturing the towns of Tolkemit and Mühlhausen, severing land communications to the Germans' East Prussian group of forces. 48th Army now turned its front to the northeast to securely close this group's escape route. German attacks to restore communications began almost immediately and 42nd Corps was attached to 5th Guards Tanks in support. By January 30 the escape attempts had been beaten off and 5th Guards Tanks began advancing, reaching the Passarge River and fighting for Frauenburg. On April 5 the 137th would be decorated with the Order of Suvorov, 2nd Degree, for the advance to the Frisches Haff as well as its part in the fighting that captured Mühlhausen, Tolkemit, and other places.

=== East Prussian Offensives ===
On February 11 the 48th Army was transferred to 3rd Belorussian Front; 42nd Corps now had just the 170th and 137th Divisions under command. This Front was responsible for eliminating the remaining German forces in East Prussia. By this time the Army's divisions, on average, did not exceed 3,500 personnel and it had only 85 tanks and self-propelled guns on strength. During late February and early March the Front prepared for a new offensive. 48th Army was to remain on the defensive against any further breakout attempts while the remainder of the Front advanced on Königsberg. It was to maintain a strong antitank defense in the direction of Braunsberg and also along the highway to Elbing.

The offensive began at 1100 hours on March 13 following a 40-minute artillery preparation and the German defenses were broken into despite fierce resistance. 48th Army went over to the attack five days later and by March 19 was fighting in the outskirts of Braunsberg, which fell the following day. On April 26 the 409th and 624th Rifle Regiments would each receive the Order of Kutuzov, 3rd Degree, for their parts in the elimination of German forces that had been trapped in the Heiligenbeil Pocket. On March 25 the Army advanced up to 6km and captured the towns of Rossen and Runenberg. At this point it went over to the defensive and remained so until the first days of May when it took part in attacks along the Baltic coast.

== Postwar ==
At the end of the war the men and women of the division carried the full title 137th Rifle, Bobryusk, Order of Suvorov Division. (Russian: 137-я стрелковая Бобруйская ордена Суворова дивизия.) On May 12 the division was moved to Elbing for garrison duty. In late May, the older personnel of the division were demobilized. The division was ordered to disbanded in August 1945. Remaining personnel were demobilized or transferred to other units. The division was disbanded in the Baltic Military District on August 31, 1945.
