= 175th Rifle Division =

175th Rifle Division (July 23, 1940 - December 27, 1941) 175th Rifle Division (December 1941 - September 4, 1942) 175th Rifle Division (October 15, 1942 - June 1, 1946)
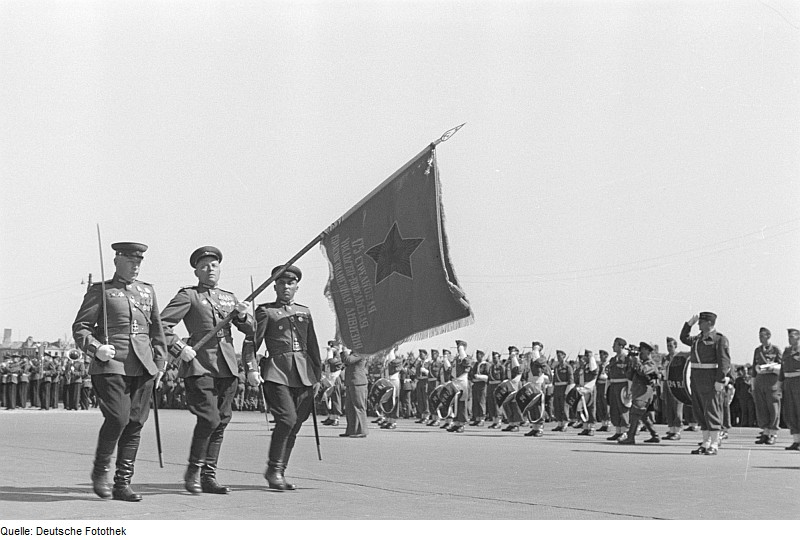
- The banner of the 175th (3rd Formation) at the Allied parade in Berlin, May 8, 1946
- Active: 1940–1946
- Country: Soviet Union
- Branch: Red Army
- Type: Infantry
- Size: Division
- Engagements: Battle of Kiev (1941); Second Battle of Kharkov; Operation Wilhelm; Case Blue; Sevsk-Trubchevsk offensive Oryol offensive Battle of Kursk; Operation Kutuzov; Gomel-Rechitsa offensive Parichi-Bobruisk offensive Operation Bagration; Lublin–Brest offensive Vistula–Oder offensive East Pomeranian offensive Battle of Berlin
- Decorations: Order of the Red Banner (3rd Formation); Order of Kutuzov (3rd Formation)
- Battle honours: Ural; Kovel (both 3rd Formation)

Commanders
- Notable commanders: Col. Semyon Mikhailovich Glovatskii; Maj. Gen. Aleksandr Demyanovich Kuleshov; Maj. Gen. Andrei Sidorovich Golovko; Col. Nikolai Nikolaevich Drozdov; Maj. Gen. Vladimir Aleksandrovich Borisov; Maj. Gen. Zakhari Petrovich Vydrigan; Maj. Gen. Andrei Nikitich Gervasiev

The 175th Rifle Division was originally formed as an infantry division of the Red Army in the North Caucasus Military District in July 1940, based on the shtat (table of organization and equipment) of September 13, 1939. It was still in that District at the time of the German invasion, and it was soon moved to the Kiev Fortified Region as part of Southwestern Front. It would remain defending the Ukrainian capital into September, eventually as part of 37th Army, when it was deeply encircled and destroyed.

A new 175th was designated in March 1942, based on a 400-series division that had begun forming the previous December in the Siberian Military District. It was soon moved to the Ural Military District, and after a rushed period of training it joined the reformed 28th Army in the Reserve of the Supreme High Command, before that Army was assigned to Southwestern Front. In May it formed part of the Front's northern shock group for the offensive intended to liberate Kharkiv. While initially hampered by the failure to take the German strongpoint at Ternovaya it gradually developed momentum in cooperation with 169th Rifle Division and ended up farther into the German positions than any other formation in the northern group, reaching to just north of Lyptsi, before being struck by an armored counterattack on May 20 and being driven back to near its starting line, at considerable cost. In June it was nearly encircled during Operation Wilhelm, but managed to escape, again with serious losses. When the main German summer offensive began later that month the remnants of the 175th were driven back to the Don River, where a relative handful of personnel and equipment were able to cross after fighting out of encirclement. The division was officially written off on September 4.

The final 175th began as the Ural Rifle Division of the NKVD in October in the Ural Military District. It retained the name "Ural" as an honorific. Early in the new year it, and five similar divisions, were transferred to the Red Army and formed as the new 70th Army. The Army was soon assigned to Central Front, where it joined the advance toward Oryol in late February and March 1943, but proved ineffective due to low standards of training and leadership. Over the following months, as these issues were taken in hand, the 175th helped to prepare for the expected German summer offensive against the Kursk salient. When this began the division was in the Army's second echelon and saw some defensive combat on the western fringe of 9th Army's attack on July 8, where it helped fight off a force of up to 200 panzers. A week later it again began advancing against the Oryol salient, reaching the German defenses at its base by late August, at which time it was transferred to 48th Army, still in Central Front. During September it advanced through northeastern Ukraine, across the Dniepr and into eastern Belarus, where it fought into January 1944, mostly near Gomel, Rechytsa and Shatsilki. At this point it was removed to the Reserve of the Supreme High Command for rebuilding and reassignment, but returned about a month later, now as part of 47th Army's 125th Rifle Corps on the long left flank of 1st Belorussian Front. It would remain under these commands for the duration of the war. In a preliminary operation on early July the 175th took part in eliminating a German salient around Kovel, and received its name as a battle honor. During the main Lublin–Brest offensive later that month it advanced through western Belarus and into eastern Poland, eventually running up against the German-held fortifications at Praga. After these were finally taken in mid-September the division was awarded the Order of the Red Banner. During the winter offensive into Poland in January 1945 the 175th, with its Army, outflanked Warsaw from the northeast, and two of its regiments were given battle honors for helping to take the city. Following this, it advanced into East Prussia and East Pomerania where its subunits received several decorations. In the final offensive on Berlin the 47th Army attacked out of the bridgehead over the Oder at Küstrin and as the operation developed swung north of the city, eventually linking up with units of 1st Ukrainian Front on April 25 in the Potsdam area. During the first five days of May, during and after the surrender of Berlin, the 175th, with its Corps, faced and defeated the largest effort to break out to the west. Following the war 47th Army was assigned to the Group of Soviet Forces in Germany, but it was disbanded in early 1946 and its units returned to the USSR. The 175th had been itself disbanded by June 1.

== 1st Formation ==
The division first began forming on July 23, 1940, at Prokhladny and Mozdok in the North Caucasus Military District. Its order of battle on June 22, 1941, was as follows:

- 560th Rifle Regiment
- 632nd Rifle Regiment
- 728th Rifle Regiment
- 630th Artillery Regiment
- 171st Antitank Battalion
- 454th Antiaircraft Battalion
- 212th Reconnaissance Company
- 190th Sapper Battalion
- 454th Signal Battalion
- 262nd Medical/Sanitation Battalion
- 515th Chemical Defense (Anti-gas) Platoon
- 259th Motor Transport Battalion
- 431st Field Bakery
- 157th Field Postal Station
- 55th Field Office of the State Bank

Col. Semyon Mikhailovich Glovatskii was appointed to command the same day the division began forming. At the start of the German invasion it was part of 64th Rifle Corps, with the 165th Rifle Division. After a brief period to complete its mobilization it began moving by rail, with its Corps, toward the front in early July, concentrating at Brovary by July 12. 64th Corps was now in the reserves of Southwestern Front.

=== Defense of Kyiv ===
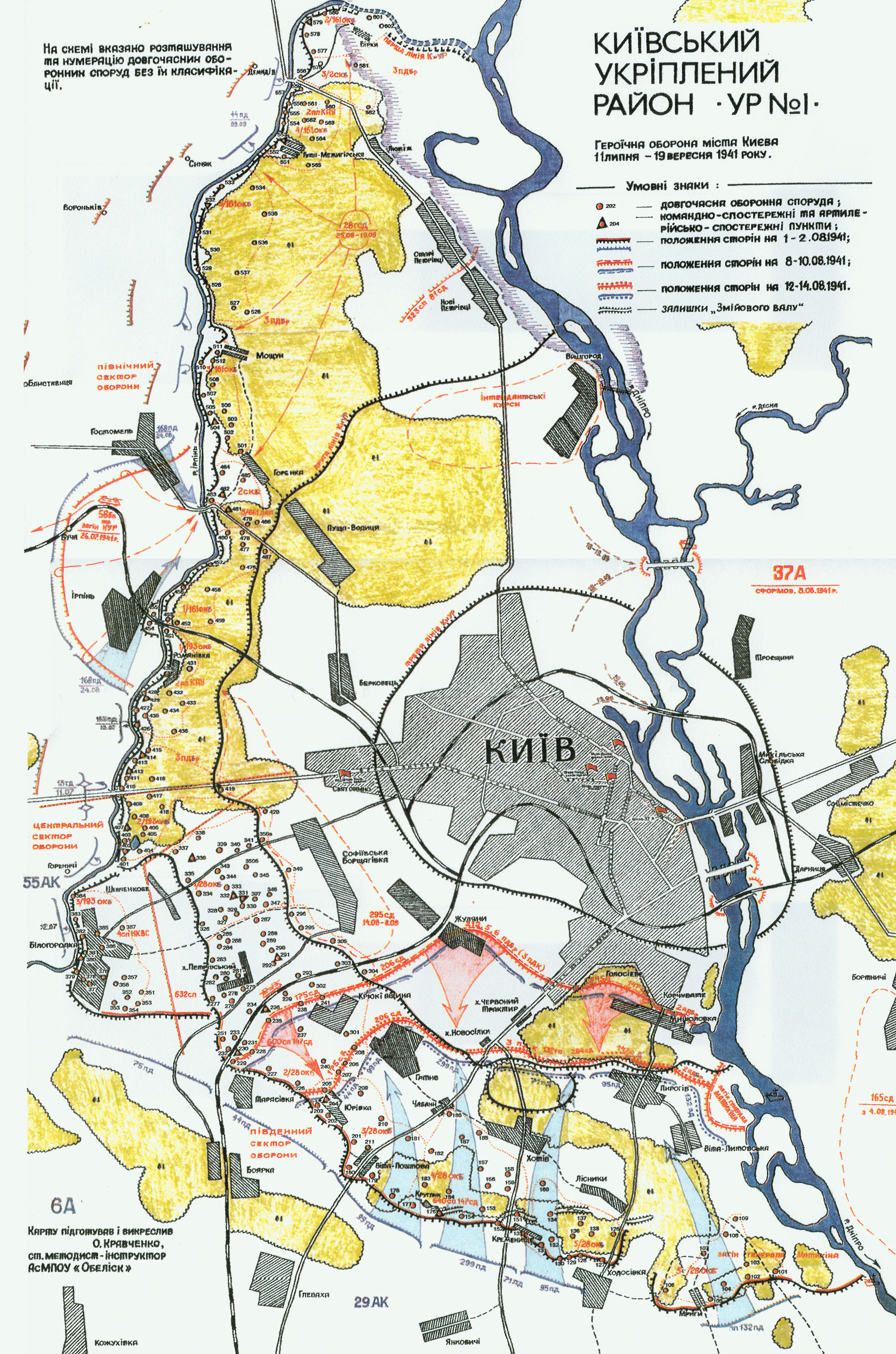
Kiev Fortified Region. Note positions of the 175th in the south.

The 13th and 14th Panzer Divisions reached the Irpin River west of Kyiv on July 11 after breaking through Southwestern Front near Zhytomyr. The German command was divided on plans to directly attack Kyiv to seize its crossings over the Dniepr River, but by July 13 German reconnaissance made it clear that Soviet fortifications and troop concentrations ruled out any possibility of taking the city by surprise. Kyiv would remain in Soviet hands for more than two further months. At about the same time the 64th Corps moved into positions along the Irpin, with the 175th west and southwest of Boiarka, and the 165th further southwest. During the first 10 days of fighting along this line the 175th lost nearly 20 percent of its personnel.

During late July and into early August the XXIX Army Corps of German 6th Army made numerous attempts to capture Kyiv, but all of these were foiled. As German forces advanced on Boiarka 64th Corps was split apart, with the 165th pushed across the Dniepr and the 175th falling back by August 11 into the Kiev Fortified Region, defending the city's southwestern sector. As of the beginning of the month the Corps was being disbanded and the 175th came under direct command of Southwestern Front. Later in August it was subordinated to the new 37th Army, which was tasked with continuing the defense of Kyiv. Meanwhile, the 2nd Panzer Group and 2nd Army of Army Group Center began their drives southward. By September 10 the remnants of 5th and 37th Armies were grouped north of Kozelets but on September 16 the 2nd Panzers linked up with the 1st Panzer Group of Army Group South well to the east and the Army was deeply encircled. Colonel Glovatskii went missing on September 15 and the situation rapidly deteriorated. The remnants of the division managed to get across the Dniepr on September 18, but there was no possibility of breaking through the German lines from so far west. The division was effectively destroyed two days later, but in common with most of the encircled divisions of Southwestern Front it officially remained on the books until December 27, when it was finally written off.

== 2nd Formation ==
The 444th Rifle Division began forming in December 1941 in the Siberian Military District. In March 1942 it was redesignated as the new 175th Rifle Division. Its order of battle was very similar to that of the 1st formation:

- 560th Rifle Regiment
- 632nd Rifle Regiment
- 728th Rifle Regiment
- 630th Artillery Regiment
- 171st Antitank Battalion
- 143rd Antiaircraft Battery
- 113th Mortar Battalion
- 212th Reconnaissance Company
- 190th Sapper Battalion
- 454th Signal Battalion
- 262nd Medical/Sanitation Battalion
- 515th Chemical Defense (Anti-gas) Platoon
- 259th Motor Transport Company
- 431st Field Bakery
- 896th Divisional Veterinary Hospital
- 1675th Field Postal Station
- 1117th Field Office of the State Bank

Maj. Gen. Aleksandr Demyanovich Kuleshov had been assigned to command of the 444th on January 23. This officer had led the 85th Rifle Division during 1934-37 before taking command of the Special Railway Corps, but was arrested on March 17, 1938 during the Great Purge. After his release in November 1939 he served as a senior instructor, and then led the 64th Rifle Corps throughout its original formation in 1941. He would remain in command of the 175th for the duration of its second formation. In March the new division was noted as having 95 percent of its personnel of Siberian, Bashkir, and Tatar nationalities, most between 33 and 42 years of age, and some 30 percent of whom had been released from prison camps. During that month it was assigned to the reformed 28th Army in the Reserve of the Supreme High Command. In April this Army came under command of Southwestern Front.

== Second Battle of Kharkiv ==
28th Army, under command of Lt. Gen. D. I. Ryabyshev, also contained the 13th Guards, 38th, 162nd, 169th, and 244th Rifle Divisions, plus a cavalry corps and four tank brigades.

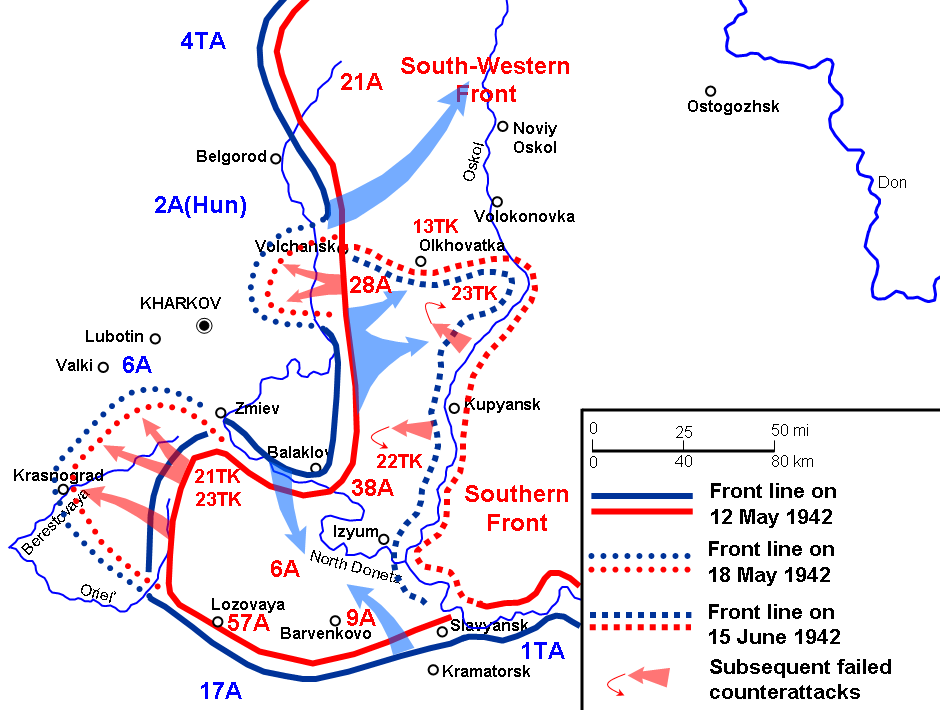
Second Battle of Kharkiv. Note position of 28th Army.

Marshal S. K. Timoshenko, who now commanded Southwestern Front, planned a new offensive to liberate Kharkiv with two shock groups. 28th Army formed the center of the northern group, with 21st Army to its north and 38th Army to its south. Ryabyshev's Army, located northeast of the city and with the bulk of the armor support, was expected to lead the advance. The offensive opened at 0630 hours on May 12 with a 60-minute artillery preparation, followed by a 15-20 minute air attack against front line strongpoints and artillery positions. The infantry and tanks went over to the attack at 0730, but many German positions remained intact. The 175th's initial objective was the village of Ternovaya in cooperation with the 169th; this was held by elements of the 429th Regiment of the 294th Infantry Division. In the event, 28th Army gained only 2–4km in heavy fighting through the day and German forces continued to hold Varvarovka and Ternovaya, hindering the development of the offensive, even though the former had been encircled.

Overnight, the commander of Army Group South released the 23rd Panzer Division plus two infantry divisions to its 6th Army to join the depleted 3rd Panzer Division as a counterattack force. When combat resumed on the morning of May 13 Ryabyshev decided to develop the offensive on his left flank, taking advantage of the gains made by 38th Army the day before. During the day the garrison of Varvarovka was liquidated but Ternovaya continued to hold out, despite itself being encircled. The left flank regiment of the 175th and the right flank of the 169th were unable to force their way into the village proper. Late in the day the 38th Division was ordered forward to maintain the encirclement while the 175th and 169th continued to advance to the west. By the middle of the day disconcerting intelligence reports were reaching Ryabyshev about large concentrations of German armor and infantry massing east of the city. Early in the afternoon the German grouping struck 38th Army, and 13th Guards was ordered to form a defense facing south.

Despite the growing crisis on his left flank, Ryabyshev urged his divisions onward on May 14. While Ternovaya continued to hold out to the 38th, the 175th and 169th advanced 6-8km, defeating several small units formed from rear-area support troops. By the end of the day the 175th had reached the Murom River, capturing the villages of Bezbozhini, Neskuchnoe, and Petrovskoe. The two divisions were now reaching the German rear defense line running along the west bank of the Kharkiv River. At the same time Ternovaya remained in German hands for several more days, requiring air supply and even reinforcements in the form of paratroops. Meanwhile, the armored attacks against 28th Army's left flank, in which the 13th Guards still held most of their positions, but at the cost of as much as a third of their strength, rendered that wing of the Army incapable of further offensive action.

After some hesitation overnight in the German command, its counterattack proceeded on May 15. A grouping consisting of an infantry regiment and 40 tanks struck from the Nepokrytaia region against the boundary of the 28th and 38th Armies and advanced northeastward toward Peremoga and Ternovaya. One regiment of the 244th Division was driven back 10km in what can only be termed a rout, finally taking up new positions 2–3km southwest of Ternovaya. Meanwhile, the 175th and 169th had received orders from Timoshenko to continue their advance alongside 21st Army. In the event, the two divisions scrambled throughout the day to contain the German breakthrough, and one regiment of the 175th was removed from the front line to deal with the paratroops. With these distractions, and despite weak resistance, the two divisions managed to gain only 5km, reaching the Lipets River. Meanwhile, Ternovaya continued to hold out against 38th Division.

21st Army attempted to continue its offensive on May 16 but ran into stiff resistance and counterattacks. However, its left flank 227th Rifle Division discovered that the main German force it faced had withdrawn to the line of the Kharkiv River. It then joined with the 175th in crossing to the west bank of the Lipets, jointly occupying the villages of Ustinka, Morokhovets, and Bednyi. The division was now nearly due north of Lyptsi, having made a deeper advance than any other division of the northern shock group. However it was also in a deep salient, as the German garrisons of Murom and Ternovaya remained in place. Over the following days efforts were made to revive the offensive of the northern group, including an order from Timoshenko on May 17 that the 169th was to attack westward to join the 175th. In the event, this was forestalled when the 3rd and 23rd Panzers, with the 71st Infantry Division, renewed their drive toward Ternovaya. The remnants of 244th Division were taken by surprise and driven off to the northeast, uncovering the Murom axis. The German garrison was relieved and 38th Division was forced to withdraw 2-3km to the east. The 169th was also forced to pull back 5-8km northward, finally taking up positions with second echelon units of 5th Guards Cavalry Division. This division, along with the regiment of the 175th that had been detached against paratroops, put up a strong defense in the Arapovka–Ploskoe area and halted any further advance on Murom. By this time the southern shock group, and indeed all the Soviet forces in the Izium salient, were in danger of encirclement and destruction due to the counteroffensive launched the same day by 1st Panzer Army in the area of Barvinkove.

Overnight the 244th was sent to the rear; it would be disbanded within a few months. Captured documents now convinced Timoshenko that the two panzer divisions would change their attack axis to the southeast in an effort to link up with 1st Panzer Army. In order to prevent this he ordered the 28th and 38th Armies to continue offensive operations on May 18 with all available forces. Despite the danger to the forces of Southwestern and Southern Fronts in the Barvinkove salient, Stalin refused to abandon the offensive on Kharkiv. 38th Army began its attack at 0700 hours, but due to organizational difficulties 28th Army did not get underway until 1130. The 169th Division was nailed down by air attacks and while the 162nd made some initial gains it was soon forced back to its start line. Meanwhile, the shift of German forces allowed 38th Division to again encircle Ternovaya.

On May 19 the Luftwaffe again dropped supplies and paratroops from 11 transport aircraft in and near Ternovaya, but this time the assault force was largely destroyed by the 38th and the detached regiment of the 175th. 28th Army again went over to the attack at 0930 hours, as did the 38th Army, but with no greater success than the day before. In the afternoon in the 21st Army's sector the 168th Infantry Division struck the 293rd Rifle Division and drove it back from Murom. This forced General Ryabyshev to commit scant reserves to cover his flank and rear. Meanwhile, 3rd Panzer was indeed on the move, but contrary to Timoshenko's understanding it had moved through Lyptsi and was concentrating, along with the 57th Infantry Division, to the northwest of the main body of the 175th. Unaware of this, Ryabyshev ordered all his forces, except the 175th, to go over to the attack again at first light on May 20. The advance was initially successful until it ran into the positions of 23rd Panzer near Vesele. At noon a German counterattack was launched against the 175th and 169th. Under pressure of armor, and almost continuous air attacks, the two divisions began to withdraw to the east, uncovering the flank of 21st Army's 227th Division to the north. By the end of the day all the units along the boundary flanks of the two Armies had been forced back 10-15km with heavy losses. The northern shock group was now along a line from Murom to Ternovaya and then south along the west bank of the Bolshaya Babka River.

Having attained this success, 6th Army did not press the offensive on this sector, but instead began to withdraw the two panzer divisions back to Lyptsi as a preliminary to redeployment toward the Barvinkove salient, where the Soviet situation was going from bad to worse. During the following days the 21st, 28th, and 38th Armies were limited to local attacks to improve positions. Timoshenko soon ordered the 175th, 169th and 227th withdrawn from the front for rebuilding, along with all the tank brigades that had supported the northern shock group. On the afternoon of May 22 the encirclement of the southern shock group and two armies of Southern Front was completed, and these forces were reduced and largely destroyed by the end of the month.

=== Operation Wilhelm ===
In early June the 175th was in much the same place as it had been at the start of the Kharkiv offensive, southwest of Vovchansk in a bridgehead over the Northern Donets centered on Staryi Saltiv. As a preliminary to the main German summer offensive Gen. F. Paulus, commander of 6th Army, intended to eliminate the bridgehead in a pincer attack in order to gain crossing points over the Donets. Altogether the bridgehead contained seven rifle divisions, five from 28th Army, including the 175th, plus two of 21st Army. All of these were under strength, backed by four weak tank brigades, three more rifle divisions and three cavalry divisions. The assault began early on June 10 and took the defenders by surprise. The four infantry divisions of VIII Army Corps took only two days to clear the bridgehead and capture Vovchansk. Meanwhile, the III Motorized Corps broke through the defenses of 38th Army to the south. Under the circumstances the 28th Army began retreating almost as soon as the German attack was underway. Rainy weather began on June 11 and this slowed the advance, along with defensive actions and counterattacks by the tank brigades. By the time the pincers closed on June 15 most of the Soviet forces had escaped, losing 24,800 men taken prisoner, largely from the now-shattered 28th Army.

=== Case Blue ===
By the start of the main German summer offensive in late June 28th Army had five rifle divisions in various states of repair (13th and 15th Guards Rifle, 38th, 169th, and 175th), plus three battered tank brigades, numbering in total about 90 tanks. The 175th was directly facing the 79th Infantry Division, with the 164 tanks of 3rd Panzer just to the north. The 244th Division was deployed near Valuyki on the Oskol River as Southwestern Front's reserve. On the first day the Army's forces managed to limit the advance of XXXX Panzer Corps to just 10km. However the German XXIX and VIII Army Corps to the north struck more than twice that distance, tearing a yawning gap between 28th and 21st Army. Over the coming days the 28th was forced to fall back towards Valuyki, exposing the flank of the 21st to its north. By July 10 the situation had drastically deteriorated and General Ryabyshev was forced to report:

We have no communications with the units of the army... By the day's end on 9 July... 175th Rifle Division was fighting encircled in the Kopanka region (28 kilometres northwest of Rovenki)... At the present time, the exact locations of the divisions are unknown; but it is most likely that the divisions no longer exist as organized formations and their encircled remnants are fighting their way eastward toward the Don River crossings.

Over the next three days the Army reported that elements of the divisions made it back safely. However by this time they mustered only 40 to 400 "bayonets" (riflemen and sappers) each, with only a handful of guns and mortars. Within days the 28th and its depleted units were transferred to the new Stalingrad Front.

In the chaos General Kuleshov became missing in action. While he nominally remained in command until September 4, when the division was written off, he had actually been captured, and died in a German PoW camp in July 1944.

== 3rd Formation ==
The Ural Rifle Division of the NKVD began forming on October 15. This would become the 3rd formation of the 175th. Its order of battle was almost completely different from the previous formations:

- 277th "Karelia" Rifle Regiment
- 278th "Revdinsk" Rifle Regiment
- 282nd "Sverdlovsk" Rifle Regiment
- 373rd "Chusovsk" Artillery Regiment
- 123rd Antitank Battalion
- 71st Reconnaissance Company
- 89th Sapper Battalion
- 454th Signal Battalion (later 663rd Signal Company)
- 104th Medical/Sanitation Battalion
- 35th Chemical Defense (Anti-gas) Platoon
- 331st Motor Transport Company
- 67th Field Bakery
- 43rd Divisional Veterinary Hospital
- 2275th Field Postal Station
- 1845th Field Office of the State Bank

NKVD Maj. Gen. Andrei Sidorovich Golovko was appointed to command on November 10. He had previously led the 22nd NKVD Motorized Rifle Division. The personnel were assembled from several sources, and by nationality were roughly 75 percent Russian and 25 percent Ukrainian, largely 19-29 years of age. The 277th Regiment was obtained from NKVD assets in Karelian Front and inherited the Order of the Red Banner it had been awarded on April 26, 1940 while serving as the 4th NKVD Border Regiment. As the Urals District did not share any borders with foreign states the bulk of the division's manpower came from railroad troops (line of communication guards) rather than border guards as was the usual case with NKVD-based Red Army divisions. On January 26, 1943, General Golovko handed the division over to Col. Nikolai Nikolaevich Drozdov, who had been serving as his deputy commander. Marshal G. K. Zhukov soon issued a decree to create the new 70th Army from a group of NKVD divisions:

"The Stavka of the Supreme High Command orders:

1. Name the Separate Army formed by the People's Commissariat of Internal Affairs of the USSR, consisting of six rifle divisions, with separate reinforcing and support units, the 70th Army and include it in the Red Army on 1 February.
2. Give the formations of the 70th Army the following designations:

- The 102nd Far Eastern Rifle Division,
- The 106th Trans-Baikal Rifle Division,
- The 140th Siberian Rifle Division,
- The 162nd Central Asian Rifle Division,
- The 175th Ural Rifle Division,
- The 181st Stalingrad Rifle Division

3. Determine the numbering and table of organization and composition of the units of 70th Army in accordance with the instructions of the Chief of the Red Army Glavupraform."

The 175th was to load aboard trains at Revda Station beginning at 1800 hours on February 9.

=== Sevsk-Trubchevsk Offensive ===
70th Army was assigned to the re-deploying Don Front (soon re-designated Central Front) under command of Col. Gen. K. K. Rokossovskii. It was some time before Rokossovskii could knock it into shape as a front-line formation, forcing him to remove many senior, ex-NKVD officers. Rokossovskii had received detailed instructions from the STAVKA early on February 6, directing him to, among other things, concentrate 70th Army's units by February 14 in the Volovo, Dolgorukovo, and Livny areas as they arrived and then send them send them off in the wake of the Front's first echelon. In the event, this deployment schedule was impossible to meet, due to shortages of rolling stock, damage to the rails themselves, and winter weather, and the start of Central Front's offensive was postponed until February 25.

At the same time, Rokossovskii made changes in his operational plan. In the first phase, Central Front would break through the German line from Nikolskoe to Karmanovo to Mashkino to Olshanka with the objective of reaching the rail line from Bryansk to Konotop. After this, the axis of the attack would be toward Sevsk and Unecha Station to cut the line from Bryansk to Gomel. This first phase would require covering up to 250km through deep snow and with a paucity of roads. 70th Army would join in the second phase, with the objective of capturing Mogilev by March 28 after concentrating in the Kursk area on February 23. These ambitious objectives proved well beyond the Army's capabilities. On February 24 Rokossovskii's chief of operations reported, in part, that the Army had largely completed unloading and was proceeding on two march routes, with the 175th, 162nd and 106th approaching Kolpny with the rear of the column passing through Livny. He also reported that each division contained 9,000-11,000 personnel, but up to 75 percent of authorized horses were missing, and there were no tractors at all for the 122mm howitzers in the artillery regiments, so they had to remain where they had been unloaded.

The strategic situation was changing by the day. Already on February 20 the XXXX Panzer Corps of Army Group South had struck the advancing forces of Southwestern Front, scoring immediate gains in the Barvinkove area. A few days later, further overextended mobile formations were destroyed by XXXXVIII Panzer Corps and the SS Panzer Corps. The STAVKA was slow to acknowledge the situation, expecting Rokossovskii's anticipated advance to make the setbacks irrelevant. This began as planned on February 25 as Central Front continued to take advantage of the weaknesses along the boundary of 2nd and 2nd Panzer Armies. The Front was led by 2nd Tank, 13th, and 65th Armies as 70th Army was still two days to the rear. German resistance at Dmitriev-Lgovsky was determined, so the 11th Tank Corps swung southward to bypass the town and drove headlong toward Sevsk, more than 50km to the west.

Rokossovskii's armies had achieved significant success by March 1. 65th Army had pushed a deep salient toward Komarichi and Trosna, and despite the arrival of 78th Infantry Division the next day the Army commander, Lt. Gen. P. I. Batov, remained confident as 70th Army arrived in his support; the 175th was now some 20km southwest of the latter place. Dmitriev-Lgovsky had been abandoned, but the garrison began a fighting withdrawal, covering the road to Bryansk, and the rate of advance in the center slowed. The direction also changed from Sevsk–Trubchevsk and more toward Komarichi and Lokat, where German reserves were gathering. During the next five days Central Front made only marginal gains in the center and on the right. On the left much greater (and somewhat misleading) progress was made as 70th Army more fully joined the 65th against the defenses of 76th Infantry and 12th Panzer Divisions on the southern approaches to Oryol. Under Rokossovskii's urgings, the commander of 70th Army, Maj. Gen. G. F. Tarasov, pushed his forces against Trosna without success and at high cost, and it became apparent to all no further advance was possible without additional reinforcements.

=== Oryol Offensive ===
These began arriving in the form of 21st Army from Stalingrad. Determined not to repeat the mistake he made in committing 70th Army piecemeal, Rokossovskii gave it several days to fully assemble around Fatezh before reinforcing Batov and Tarasov. Finally, in the last days of February the STAVKA began to grasp the gravity of the situation created by Army Groups South's counterstroke south of Kharkiv, and began shifting the flow of reserves which had been intended for Central Front. At 2130 hours on March 7 Rokossovskii's mission was changed. Instead of striking deeply at Bryansk and beyond, he was to cooperated with Western and Bryansk Fronts in encircling and defeating the German forces in the salient around Oryol:

... 2. Turn the forces of General Batov's, Tarasov's, and Chistiakov's armies from the west toward the north and northeast, with the missions to destroy the enemy's Dmitrovsk-Orlovskii group of forces and cut the railroad line between Briansk and Orel somewhere east of Karachev with the combined forces of these armies and, by doing so, help the Briansk Front liquidate the enemy's Orel group of forces.

The 2nd Tank, 65th and 70th Armies would deploy left to right along the Usozha River with 21st Army joining as soon as possible.

Rokossovskii sent out his orders for the revised plan in the afternoon of March 8, and these expected an early arrival of 21st Army. Tarasov was directed to continue its advance on the morning on March 9 "in the general direction of Volobuevo, Apal'kovo, and Naryshkino" and subsequently capture a series of lines before taking the Oryol region in conjunction with 21st Army around March 14. The 175th was on the Army's right flank of the first echelon, which also contained the 102nd and 140th Divisions, and faced the 12th Panzers. While the 65th and 2nd Tank Armies made gains on March 10, 2nd Panzer Army began to receive reserves and 70th Army stalled. Meanwhile, the changing situation was producing command confusion within STAVKA; effective March 12 Bryansk Front was disbanded, with three armies shifted to Central Front. The following day a new Reserve Front was established. On March 14 two infantry divisions of 2nd Army began a counterattack east of Hlukhiv against a thin screen on the left flank of Central Front which soon put 2nd Guards Cavalry Corps in an untenable position. Rokossovskii had few options available. An attack by 16th Army north of Oryol had utterly failed, his own progress was minimal, and Army Group South had renewed its offensive against Voronezh Front south of Kharkiv, which had fallen on March 15. As the panzers moved north, Central Front was in jeopardy. 21st Army was reassigned to Voronezh Front, which ended any possibility that Rokossovskii could successfully continue his offensive, although he continued limited operations until March 21.

On March 25 Colonel Drozdov returned to his chief of staff duties and Col. Vladimir Aleksandrovich Borisov took command of the 175th. This officer had previously served as chief-of-staff and later deputy commander of the 13th Guards Division, before attending the Voroshilov Academy for roughly six months. He would be promoted to the rank of major general on September 25. Rokossovskii issued a long decree on April 4 in which he extensively critiqued the performance of 70th Army and requested that the STAVKA relieve General Tarasov of his command. He focused on fighting in the second half of March for the villages of Svetlyi Luch, Novaia Ialta, Rzhavchik, Muravchik and Hill 260.2 which led to losses of 8,849 personnel killed and wounded, as well as a good deal of equipment. He blamed this, first, on inadequate reconnaissance and poor provision of artillery support. Lack of cooperation with supporting tanks was also noted. Specific to the 175th, it was noted that Colonel Sedlovsky, the commander of the 278th Regiment at the time, had ordered all of his command cadre to enter the forward lines, in contravention of NKO Orders No. 456 and 306, in a desperate effort to get the attack moving in the final days of fighting. As a result, all of his battalion commanders and most of his company and platoon leaders, as well as their political officers and workers, became casualties. In the division overall, during the same period, 224 members of the command cadre were killed or wounded. The decree also noted that, due to a lack of planning for the rasputitsa the roads were not kept passable for supply traffic, to the point that 112 men of the 102nd Division and two of the 175th were reported to have died of starvation. Tarasov was relieved of command, being replaced by Lt. Gen. I. V. Galanin.

== Battle of Kursk ==
70th Army remained along the line it had gained in March through the rest of the spring and into July. This formed the northwestern corner of the Kursk salient, with 65th Army on its left flank and 13th Army on its right. By late April the STAVKA had decided to go over to the strategic defensive and prepare for a German offensive against the salient, which all intelligence indicated was in the works. The preparation of extensive fortifications was put in hand. The reinforced 70th Army occupied a sector 62km in length. It was not expected to come under attack initially except along its boundary with 13th Army, as the German forces were considered most likely to launch a classic pincer movement against the bases of the salient. However, one variant considered possible by Rokossovskii was a main attack on 70th Army's front in the direction of Fatezh and Kursk.

German plan of attack at Kursk. Note position of 70th Army.

As of July 5, when the offensive began, Galanin had eight rifle divisions under his command, plus three tank regiments, ten artillery and mortar regiments, and an antitank brigade. Six of the divisions were grouped under the 19th and 28th Rifle Corps, but the 175th and 140th remained under direct Army control. They were both in the Army's second echelon, along with the 162nd and 132nd Rifle Divisions. The tank regiments were grouped behind the right flank where the German attack was most likely. Galanin had placed his headquarters in the woods north of Radogoshcha.

At 0210 hours Rokossovskii ordered an artillery counter-preparation along his Front's right wing. This lasted 20 minutes with mixed results, but delayed the start of the offensive between 1 1/2 and 2 hours. The German artillery preparation began at 0430. The main attack of German 9th Army was directed at Olkhovatka, but a secondary thrust by elements of XXXXVI Panzer Corps (7th Infantry and 20th Panzer Divisions) was made at the boundary of 13th and 70th Armies at Gnilets. This struck the 132nd and 280th Rifle Divisions but made only marginal gains. However, a group of tanks and motorized infantry managed to penetrate the left flank of 13th Army and got into the rear of the 132nd. Later in the day this division began to fall back under renewed pressure from XXXXVI Corps. However, German losses were very high and the Soviet line remained intact.

Fighting along Central Front's line continued through July 6-7, until Rokossovskii declared to his army commanders that "We have won the defensive battle, and our new mission is to finish off the defeated enemy by the launching of a decisive offensive." The next day, in an effort to revive the offensive, another large German grouping launched heavy attacks against the boundary of 13th and 70th Armies, aiming to drive apart the 175th and 140th Divisions near Samodurovka. More than 200 tanks and self-propelled guns were committed to the attack. Elements of the 140th repelled 13 attacks over the course of the day; having suffered heavy losses the following attack began to force the division back to the south. However, the 175th and neighboring 70th Rifle Division held firm. They then committed their reserves in the direction of Samodurovka, closed off the breach created by the retreat of the 140th, and cut off the tanks and infantry that had infiltrated. These tanks attempted several times to regain contact with their main forces, but gradually fell victim to antitank units. This ended the German offensive along this sector and the former attackers began to dig in.

=== Operation Kutuzov ===
The Western and Bryansk Fronts went over to the offensive against the Oryol salient on July 12. On the same day Rokossovskii ordered his Front to be ready to go over to the attack on July 15. Apart from the 13th, his armies had emerged relatively unscathed from the defensive battle. They were first to destroy the forces of 9th Army that had penetrated the Front's positions and regain the original line by the end of July 17. Following this, they were to continue to advance in the general direction of Oryol. In the first phase the 70th was to specifically cooperate with 13th and 48th Armies, as well as 16th Air Army. The 175th was one of three divisions initially assigned to hold a defensive line while the remainder of the Army moved forward.

On the first day, in common with most of the Front, Galinin's forces only made slight gains. The following morning, units on his right wing defeated the German grouping in the area of Height 250 and reached the area of Gnilets. German resistance was stubborn, based on covering detachments of infantry and tanks (some disabled from the earlier fighting) as the main forces fell back to their July 5 jumping-off positions. These had been well prepared over months and the German command expected to halt the offensive here.

The commander of 9th Army, Gen. W. Model, demanded that his troops maintain these positions, but Central Front's right wing armies maintained their momentum and on July 21 broke through the line along the Ochka River before pushing onward toward Kamenets and Kromy. During the following 10 days the 13th and 70th Armies made a steady advance despite desperate counterattacks. By the end of August 1 they had reached a line from Nadezhda to Krasnikovo while continuing the march on Kromy. On August 4, elements of Bryansk Front's 3rd Army liberated Oryol. The right wing armies of Central Front took Kromy on August 6 and by the end of August 11 had reached a line from Mytskoe to outside Dmitrovsk-Orlovskii. This town was taken the next day, and by August 17-18 a line from Glybochka to Terekhovka to Uporoi had been reached. This line contained previously prepared positions in some depth (the Hagen Line), and during the following days the advance slowed considerably. At about this time the 175th was transferred to 48th Army, still in Central Front.

== Into Ukraine and Belarus ==
Central Front struck 2nd Army's center at Sevsk and east flank at Klintsy on August 26. The Front's forces quickly broke the German line with 60th Army in the lead. On September 2 the XIII Army Corps was ordered to fall back to the west and maintain contact with Army Group South, but instead was pushed south across the Seym River into the 4th Panzer Army sector, thereby opening a 30km wide gap between Army Groups South and Center. The following day, 2nd Army withdrew to the Desna River as General Rokossovskii paused to regroup. On September 9 the Front's forces forced this river south of Novhorod-Siverskyi and at Otsekin.

Central Front liberated Nizhyn on the Oster River on September 15, which finally triggered the OKH to order a full withdrawal to the Dniepr. Over the next five days the Front staged a two-pronged thrust northward on either side of Chernihiv which collapsed the flank of 2nd Army, allowing it to advance north toward Gomel.

=== Gomel-Rechytsa Offensive ===
48th Army, commanded by Lt. Gen. P. L. Romanenko, closed up to the German defenses at Gomel from the east and south on September 29-30. He arrayed his five divisions under direct Army command in an arc extending from Dobrush along the Iput River for some 25km to where it entered the Sozh River. The Army largely faced the XXXV Army Corps. During the first two weeks of October, Rokossovskii launched his first attempt to seize Gomel and advance on Rechytsa, but this was unsuccessful. For the second attempt he called for the formation of three shock groups on Central Front's right wing (48th, 65th and 61st Armies). These were to attack on October 15 in the direction of Babruysk and Minsk. The first of these included seven divisions from 48th Army and four from 65th Army. Three divisions (102nd, 194th, and 307th), were moved into a bridgehead over the Sozh south of Gomel while the 175th, 137th and 170th took over their former sectors. In the event, this effort made little more progress than the first attempt.

On October 20, Central Front was redesignated as Belorussian Front. Rokossovskii planned for a renewed offensive to begin on November 10. Over the first ten days of the month the Front carried out another regrouping to continue the offensive and encircle and destroy the German Rechytsa-Gomel grouping. He ordered the 175th, 102nd and 73rd Rifle Divisions into the bridgehead between the Dniepr and Sozh while the 42nd Rifle Corps was moved to a bridgehead over the Dniepr south of Loyew where it was backed up by two other divisions in the Corps' second echelon. In three days of fighting the forces of 48th and 65th Armies managed to tear a gap 15km wide and from 8–12km deep in the German defenses, and were halfway to Rechytsa. Over the next four days XXXV Corps was driven back into the city, and on November 18 the German forces evacuated it, crossing to the east bank of the Dniepr. At about the same time the 175th was incorporated into 29th Rifle Corps, which also contained the 73rd and 102nd Divisions. Army Group Center's southern defenses were in a state of crisis by this point, and 9th Army had been forced out of Gomel. Along with a small group from 1st Guards Tank Corps the 48th joined the advance of 11th and 63rd Armies, which were pursuing the XXXV Corps as it withdrew from Gomel. By November 30 the combined armies had pushed the Corps westward and northwestward to the Klenovichi–Potapovka line, 25km southeast of Zhlobin. On November 29, General Borisov was wounded and hospitalized, and Colonel Drozdov again took command of the division until January 19, 1944, when Borisov returned from convalescence.

==== Operation Nikolaus ====
With the fall of Gomel, Rokossovskii saw the next objectives of his center armies as Parichi and Babruysk to the northwest; the terrain along this route was excessively swampy but seen as easier to traverse in mid-winter. Before this could take place, Army Group Center took measures to close the gap between 2nd and 9th Armies. XXXV Corps was ordered to regroup during December 12-19 to defend the crossing over the Berezina River at Shatsilki. Meanwhile, XXXXI Panzer Corps was assigned to defend the Parichi–Babruysk sector. This Corps concentrated its 134th Infantry and 16th Panzer Divisions (the latter just arrived from France) and 1st SS Infantry Brigade into a bridgehead it held southeast of Parichi. South of the gap 2nd Army assembled a force including the 12th and 4th Panzer Divisions along the road from Rechytsa to Kalinkavichy. The operation, designated Operation Nikolaus, began on December 20, and initially targeted the 19th Rifle Corps of 65th Army, which was overextended and shattered almost immediately.

General Batov did his best to support his 19th Corps with other units of his Army. In addition, on December 21 Romanenko sent both his 73rd and 175th from 29th Corps across the Berezina to help bring the panzers to a halt. They took up positions on the right flank of 65th Army's 95th Rifle Corps northwest of Shatsilki. Nikolaus continued on December 22-23 as the German force drove to encircle and destroy a large part of Batov's Army. 16th Panzer advanced down the west bank of the Berezina, supported by 1st SS and elements of 253rd Infantry Division, reaching as far as Chirkovichi, 6km north of Shatsilki. Late on the 22nd, Batov ordered the remnants of 19th Corps to withdraw into the 5km-wide sector held by the 73rd. By this time the 1st Guards Tanks had sent a brigade to each of the 19th, 29th, and 95th Corps.

On December 24 the 16th Panzer pushed southwest deep into the rear area of 19th Corps, with the intention of linking up with 4th Panzer near Davydovka. This was accomplished by nightfall on December 26, trapping elements of four rifle divisions and 16th Guards Tank Brigade. Meanwhile, the 253rd Infantry expanded a small bridgehead west of Shatsilki. Over the next three days the German forces tried to destroy the pocketed group, but many of its remnants managed to escape to the south in small groups. They then reinforced a new Soviet line from Davydovka to just north of the railroad to Shatsilki initially manned by the 175th and 44th Guards Rifle Division and the remainder of 1st Guards Tanks. Nikolaus was soon brought to a halt along this line, partly because the strong 16th Panzer was urgently needed elsewhere.

=== Parichi-Bobruisk Offensive ===
For Rokossovskii's next attempt to reach Parichi and Babruysk General Romanenko formed a shock group with his 42nd and 29th Corps with armor support and it was to launch its attack in the 15km-wide sector from Shatsilki on the Berezina southwest to Zherd Station on the Shatsilki–Kalinkavichy rail line, facing elements of XXXXI Panzer. This was to begin on January 16, 1944, and was to reach a line from Oktyabirskii to Parichi by the end of the month, after which 48th and 65th Armies were to exploit to Babruysk. By this time the 175th had been moved to 42nd Corps; the Corps' immediate objectives were the villages of Zareche and Sosnovka roughly 15km behind the front, so it attacked in a two-echelon formation to sustain its drive across the Zherdianka River and beyond. This required a regrouping in which the 194th Division provided cover for the 175th to move into first echelon and the 399th Rifle Division to move into second.

From the beginning the 194th and 175th struggled to penetrate the German forward defenses, as related in the divisional history of the 194th:

Once again included in 42nd Rifle Corp, 194th Rifle Division took part in combat operations along the Zherdianka River from 16 through 27 January. After a 35-minute artillery preparation, it attacked the enemy's positions in the Peshishche and Kun'ia sector with two of its regiments, but had no success. The 470th and 954th Rifle Regiments were not able to advance forward and went to ground, halted by a squall of Hitlerite fire. After being committed to combat from the second echelon, 616th Rifle Regiment also went to ground, failing to reach it assigned objectives. Only on the fourth day of the offensive did the division succeed in breaking through the enemy's defenses and capturing the enemy strongpoints at Peshishche, Kremen, Kun'ia, and Medved'.

The advance of 42nd Corps was finally halted by the German 36th Infantry Division at Sosnovka and the large swath of swampy terrain that extended nearly 10km to its west. However, the 36th had given up considerable ground. Before the operation entered its second phase the 175th was removed to the Reserve of the Supreme High Command on January 30 for rebuilding, where it was reassigned to 70th Army.

== Operation Bagration ==
In February the division was assigned to 125th Rifle Corps (commanded by Maj. Gen. Ivan Kuzmich Kuzmin) in 47th Army, which was part of the first formation of 2nd Belorussian Front. In April this Front was reabsorbed into 1st Belorussian Front, and the 175th would remain under these three commands for the duration of the war. 47th Army was located in the long westward extension of its Front south of the Pinsk Marshes in the vicinity of Kovel. On June 10 General Borisov left the division, and three days later took over the 44th Guards, which he would lead into the postwar, becoming a Hero of the Soviet Union on June 4, 1945. Colonel Drozdov again took over command of the 175th.

=== Lublin-Brest Offensive ===
The summer offensive against Army Group Center began on June 22/23, but the five Armies on 1st Belorussian Front's left flank remained inactive into mid-July. At the start of that month the 125th Corps consisted of the 175th, 60th, and 76th Rifle Divisions. In a preliminary attack the 47th was ordered to take the German-held salient around Kovel in order to simplify communications and supply routing. This was completed when the city was evacuated, and the division was awarded a battle honor:

KOVEL – ... 175th Rifle Division (Colonel Drozdov, Nikolai Nikolaevich)... The troops that participated in the liberation of Kovel, by order of the Supreme Commander-in-Chief of 6 July 1944 and a commendation in Moscow, are given a salute of 12 artillery salvoes by 124 guns.

Prior to the start of the main offensive the Armies and the forces within them carried out substantial regroupings. During July 6-12 the 8th Guards Army reached its jumping-off positions following several night marches and over the next two nights relieved units of the 91st and 125th Corps to occupy the sector assigned to it under the operational plan. Overall, 47th Army's main forces were shifted to its left flank.

The left flank Armies joined the offensive at 0530 hours on July 18, following a 30-minute artillery preparation. Forward detachments of battalion or regimental size attacked and soon determined that the German first and part of the second trench lines had been abandoned, so a further 110-minute preparation was cancelled. The leading Armies (47th, 8th Guards, and 69th) reached the second defense zone along the Vyzhuvka River on July 19 and quickly forced a crossing, which led to the zone's collapse by noon, followed by a pursuit of the defeated forces, advancing 20-25km. On July 20 the leading Armies reached the final defense line along the Western Bug River and began taking crossing points off the march with their mobile units. 47th Army was now being led by the 2nd Guards Cavalry Corps, and by dusk was fighting along a line from outside Zalesie to Grabowo to Zabuzhye after a further advance of 18-26km. The Front's forces were now in a position to begin the encirclement of the German forces around Brest.

The main forces of the Front's left wing were directed against Lublin on July 21, while 47th Army, along with a mobile group of 2nd Guards Cavalry and 11th Tank Corps, was tasked with reaching Siedlce. By the end of July 23 the Army had reached the line Danze–Podewucze–Pszwloka, following an advance of 52km in three days. By July 27 it was running into greater resistance, especially in the area of Biała Podlaska and Mendzizec, which blocked the encirclement of part of the Brest grouping. On July 29 Brest was finally encircled and taken, with Siedlce falling on July 31. By this time, 47th Army was spread across a front of 74km. Meanwhile, on July 28 the 2nd Tank Army was approaching the Praga suburb of Warsaw, which the STAVKA soon gave orders to be seized, along with bridgeheads over the Vistula River. This Army's attack soon ran into heavy resistance and stalled. The Praga area contained complex and modern fortifications and would prove a hard nut to crack. The German command soon struck with a powerful counterattack of five panzer and one infantry divisions against the boundary of 2nd Tank and 47th Armies in an effort to hold the place, and 2nd Tank was ordered not to attempt to storm the fortifications, but to wait for heavy artillery. In addition, both Armies were suffering severe shortages of fuel and ammunition after the long advance. On August 8, Drozdov handed the division over to Col. Zakhari Petrovich Vydrigan; Drozdov would go on to command the 48th NKVD Rifle Regiment in 1945. Vydrigan had served as both deputy commander and commander of the 76th Division before being wounded and hospitalized in July. He would be promoted to the rank of major general on April 20, 1945, and would lead the 175th into the postwar.

=== Battle for Praga ===
Marshal Rokossovskii planned to take Praga no later than August 8. This was to be carried out by the 2nd Tank, 47th, 28th and 70th Armies. By August 9 it was clear this had failed, and in fact some ground had been lost. The next day, the 47th was to launch an attack toward Kossow and Wyszków. On September 5 most of the Front went over to the defensive, but the battle for Praga went on until September 14, when the fortress was finally taken. For its part in this victory the 175th would be awarded the Order of the Red Banner on October 31.

== Vistula-Oder Offensive ==
An October report stated that 90 percent of the 175th's personnel were conscripts from Ukraine and Belarus. In November, command of 1st Belorussian Front was transferred to Marshal Zhukov. For the January offensive the Front was ordered to launch a supporting attack north of Warsaw with the 47th along a 4km-wide front for the purpose of clearing the German forces between the Vistula and Western Bug, in conjunction with the left wing of 2nd Belorussian Front. Following this the Army was to outflank Warsaw from the northeast and help capture the city in cooperation with the 1st Polish Army and part of 61st and 2nd Guards Tank Armies.

The main offensive began on January 12, 1945, but 47th Army did not begin its attack until January 15, with a 55-minute artillery preparation. By day's end it had cleared the inter-river area east of Modlin. Overnight the Army's 129th Rifle Corps forced a crossing of the frozen Vistula. On January 17 the 1st Polish Army began the fight for Warsaw and, threatened with encirclement, the German garrison abandoned it. For their parts in the victory two regiments of the 175th received a battle honor:

WARSAW – ... 282nd Rifle Regiment (Lt. Colonel Lazebnikov, Nikolai Seliverstovich)... 373rd Artillery Regiment (Major Roshchin, Nikolai Leontevich)... The troops that participated in the battles for the liberation of Warsaw, by order of the Supreme Commander-in-Chief of 17 January 1945, and a commendation in Moscow, are given a salute of 24 artillery salvoes by 324 guns.

Following this success the STAVKA ordered an all-out advance to the Oder River. 47th Army reached the Bzura by 1800 hours that same day. As the Front's right flank lengthened to 110-120km by January 25 the 47th, 1st Polish, and 3rd Shock Armies were brought up to guard against any counteroffensive from German forces in East Pomerania. By the end of the next day elements of the Army captured Bydgoszcz and Nakło nad Notecią.

Over the following weeks the Front's right wing forces eliminated the German garrisons blockaded in Schneidemühl, Deutsch Krone, and Arnswalde, but otherwise gained only up to 10km of ground. For its role in the taking of Deutsch Krone the 373rd Artillery Regiment was given the Order of Kutuzov, 3rd Degree, on April 5. The German 11th Army launched a hastily planned counteroffensive at Stargard on February 15 and two days later the 47th Army was forced to abandon the towns of Piritz and Bahn and fall back 8-12km.

=== East Pomeranian Offensive ===
After the Stargard offensive was shut down on February 18, Zhukov decided split the 11th Army by attacking toward the Baltic Sea. 47th Army was tasked with reaching and taking the city of Altdamm. This was accomplished on March 20, and as a result, on April 26 the 278th Regiment would be awarded the Order of Suvorov, 3rd Degree, and the 123rd Antitank Battalion received the Order of Alexander Nevsky for their parts in retaking Stargard and capturing several other towns in Pomerania, including Bärwalde, Tempelburg, and Falkenburg. On May 3 the 278th would also receive the Order of Kutuzov, 3rd Degree, for the fighting for Altdamm.

== Berlin Offensive ==
At the start of the final offensive on the German capital the 47th Army was deployed in the bridgehead over the Oder at Küstrin on a 8km-wide sector. In the days just before the attack commenced the 175th was one of five divisions of the Army that relieved the right-flank divisions of 5th Shock Army. The 47th planned to make its main strike in the center, a 4.3km sector from Neulewin to Neubarnim. 125th Corps consisted of the same divisions as previously and was in the Army's center. The 60th and 175th were in first echelon, with the 76th in second. At this time the rifle divisions' strengths varied between 5,000 and 6,000 men each. The divisions in first echelon had the immediate goal of penetrating the defense to a depth of 4.5-5km, which would carry them through the first two German positions. The Army was supported by 101 tanks and self-propelled guns.

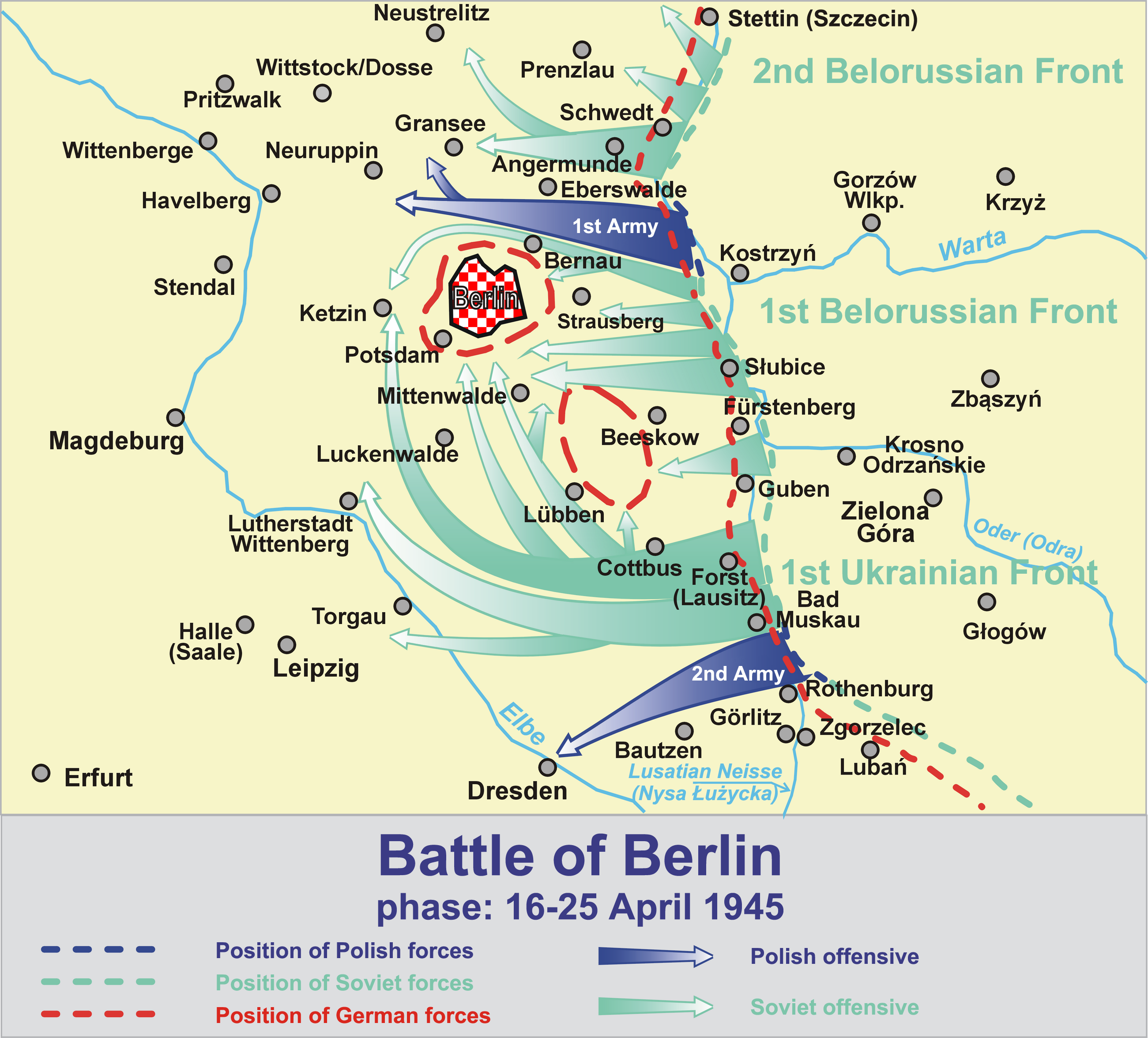
Battle of Berlin. Note location of the Küstrin (Kostrzyn) bridgehead.

During April 14-15, 47th Army carried out reconnaissance actions from Karlsbiese to outside Ortwig with scout units of five divisions, including the 175th. Two battalions, together with a battalion of the 230th Rifle Division, penetrated the first line of trenches, advanced 2.5km, and consolidated on a line from Marker 6.4 to Neubarnim railway station. The main offensive began before dawn on April 16 on the sectors of 1st Belorussian and 1st Ukrainian Fronts. A massive artillery bombardment was launched at 0500 hours, except on the fronts of 47th and 33rd Armies. On 47th Army's front the bombardment started 0550 and lasted 25 minutes. The infantry went into the attack at 0615 against defenders that were badly shaken and had suffered significant casualties. The 175th's leading infantry pushed right up to the shell bursts two minutes before the end of the fire onslaught and Colonel Vydrigan demanded that the fire be shifted to the next line. Between them the 60th and 175th took the powerful strongpoint of Neulewin against stiff resistance and by day's end had reached a line from Teringswerder to the railroad south of that place, for a total gain of 6km. Overall, 47th Army had broken through the main defensive zone, and on its left flank reached the intermediate defense position.

Zhukov ordered that the attack continue through the night, following a 30-40-minute artillery preparation, so as to break through the intermediate defense position. 47th Army made some progress through the dark, but its general offensive began at 0800 hours after another 30-minute preparation. 125th Corps, still with the 60th and 175th forward, finished off the German resistance in the intermediate position, forced a crossing of the Friedlanderstrom Canal, and by the end of the day reached a line from Wriezen Station to Wewe, penetrating the second defensive zone in the course of an advance of 4km. Overnight, the troops of the Front consolidated their positions and took part in reconnaissance. After a short artillery preparation the offensive continued on the morning of April 18.

47th Army stepped off at 1000 hours after a 40-minute bombardment. 125th Corps, in the same combat formation, advanced another 4km and reached a line from outside a grove 1,000m southwest of Wriezen to outside Schulzendorf by the end of the day, becoming involved in fighting for the latter place. Despite the day's successes, and others, Zhukov was becoming concerned that the offensive was proceeding too slowly, and ordered that steps be taken to improve command and control, beginning on April 19. In addition, the 47th, as well as the 3rd Shock and 5th Shock Armies shift their axes of attack from northwest and west to west and southwest, with the objective of breaking into Berlin as quickly as possible. Specifically, the 47th was directed to advance on Haselberg, Baiersdorf, Schildow, and Hermsdorf; these last two were in the northern part of the city.

Fighting on April 19 was focused on the third defensive zone which now contained German reserves moved up from the city. 47th Army had brought up its artillery overnight and made its main attack at noon, following an artillery preparation of 30 minutes. General Kuzmin committed his 76th Division and during the day the Corps was successful in capturing Haselberg and Ludersdorf by day's end following an advance of 6-9km, ending along a line from a road junction 1,000m west of Haselberg to Harnekop. Units of the Corps made repeated attempts to break into the Freienwalder Staatforst woods, with no success. Kuzmin was now ordered to take advantage of the advance of 129th Corps to his left, and sidle to the south in the rear of that Corps in order to bypass the woods. After nightfall one division of the Corps was pulled back into second echelon. To the rear the 7th Guards Cavalry Corps was waiting for the infantry to produce a gap in the German lines at or near the boundary of 77th and 125th Corps.

=== Encircling Berlin ===
47th, 3rd Shock and 5th Shock Armies were ordered on April 20 to continue a rapid advance during the day with their first echelons and through the night with their second echelons. The 47th now had the support of 9th Guards Tank Corps and 1st Mechanized Corps of 2nd Guards Tank Army. With this assistance the Army advanced 12km during the day, and the mobile troops as much as 22km, breaking through Berlin's outer ring on a 8km sector from Leuenberg to Tiefensee. Overnight the Army cleared Bernau in cooperation with 9th Guards Tanks. Zhukov's first priority for the next day was to preempt and German effort to organize on the inner ring. The Army responded by taking Schenow, Zepernick and Buch.

During April 21 the 47th gained 15-20km, cut the Berlin ring road, and closed up on the city's northern outskirts. The next day the Army, still with 9th Guards Tanks, continued attacking to the west in an effort to envelop the city from the north. By 2000 hours the leading infantry began crossing the Havel River. By day's end the 60th and 175th Divisions were fighting for Hennigsdorf alongside the tanks. Only 60km remained between the Army and 1st Ukrainian Front's 4th Guards Tank Army advancing from the south. For the next day the 47th was directed to reach the area of Spandau, then detach one division with one tank brigade from 9th Guards Tanks to drive towards Potsdam and take it, cutting the German retreat path from the city to the west. 125th Corps, having passed the Havel with its main forces, ended the day on the line from Wansdorf to Sidlung Schoenwalde. During the day the Army had covered another 8km to the west, crossed two corps over the Havel, and turned its front to the southwest. Overnight, Zhukov ordered the Army to complete the encirclement, in conjunction 4th Guards Tanks, by taking a line from Paren to Potsdam.

April 24 saw the 47th continuing to attack to the southwest toward Brandenburg. German forces on its right flank continued retreating to the south. 9th Guards Tanks, which had moved through the dark, managed to seize Nauen from the march at 0800. 125th Corps directed the 76th Division toward Potsdam while the rest of the Corps fought to crush the resistance of the German forces desperately fighting to hold open Berlin's communications to the west. The Corps advanced another 10km, and just 10 more separated the Army from 4th Guards Tanks. The objective for April 25 remained Potsdam. At noon, men of the 328th Rifle Division, with tanks of the 6th Guards Tank Brigade, joined hands with 4th Guards Tank Army's 6th Guards Mechanized Corps, completing the encirclement of Berlin. 125th Corps continued its advance to the southeast and, while still meeting heavy fire, took the Berlin suburbs of Falkensee, Falkenhagen, and Lager Doberitz; by day's end to have reached the line Neu Fahrland–Groß Glienicke–Seeburg, with its front to the southeast and east.

At this point the combined strength of the 125th and 129th Rifle Corps, with the supporting 6th Artillery Division and 74th Antiaircraft Division was 43,077 personnel, with 593 mortars, 556 guns of 76mm or larger calibre, and 123 45mm antitank guns. During April 26 the 125th Corps carried out a regrouping and then resumed the offensive at 1130 hours from the line reached the day before in the direction of Kladow and Gatow. By day's end it had linked up with units of 1st Ukrainian Front on the Havel near Gatow after a 3-4km advance to cut off the German Potsdam grouping from the forces in Berlin. This grouping became the main objective the following day. Nearly all of 47th Army continued to attack toward Spandau and Potsdam. By the end of the day the 125th and 129th Corps had defeated the German forces in Staaken, Spandau, and Wilhelmstadt and formed a solid front along the Havel. These victories and others effectively eliminated the last chance for the forces in Berlin to break out to the west.

On April 28, 47th Army was mainly occupied with mopping up the Potsdam area before regrouping during the afternoon for an advance westward on Butzow with its main forces, consisting of 77th and 129th Corps. By the end of the day these had reached a line from Buschow to Barnewitz to Brielow after covering 20km in road column formation. Meanwhile, through April 29-May 1 the 125th continued mopping up in the area southeast of Potsdam, eliminated the pocketed forces near Kladow and continued fighting in the Pichelsdorf area. By May 1 the Corps was spread along a 35km-wide front, and at dusk a German grouping took advantage of the gaps in this front in order to cross to the west bank of the Havel near Pichelsdorf. Some 17,000 men of the Ruhleben Group, with 70-80 armored vehicles, and accompanied by up to 300 high-ranking Nazi officials, managed to seize a bridge, and after crossing split into small groups to make their ways west. The Corps fought through May 5 in order to round up and eliminate these refugees.

Despite this exploit, the encircled defenders of Berlin were increasingly demoralized, particularly by the massive artillery onslaught. At 0040 hours on May 2 the LVI Panzer Corps had broadcast in Russian requesting a cease fire and parley. The mass surrender of German troops had begun overnight, continued through the day, and by 1500 resistance had completely ceased.

== Postwar ==
The division ended the war as the 175th Rifle, Ural-Kovel, Order of The Red Banner Division. (Russian: 175-я стрелковая Уральско-Ковельская Краснознамённая дивизия.) In a final round of awards on May 28 the division as a whole was given the Order of Kutuzov, 2nd Degree, while the following decorations were also received:

- 277th Rifle Regiment - Order of Suvorov, 3rd Degree
- 282nd Rifle Regiment - Order of Kutuzov, 3rd Degree
- 89th Sapper Battalion - Order of Alexander Nevsky
- 454th Signal Battalion - Order of the Red Star

These were all for their parts in the fighting for Berlin. The next day the Group of Soviet Forces in Germany was formed, under the terms of STAVKA Order No. 11095, effective June 10. At about this time, General Vydrigan was placed at the disposal of the Group's military council; he would go on to serve as deputy commander of 92nd Rifle Corps before his retirement in May, 1946. He was replaced by Col. Andrei Nikitich Gervasiev, who had been leading the 76th Rifle Division for nearly a year. He would be promoted to major general on July 11.

In February 1946 the 47th Army was disbanded, and its remaining units were withdrawn to the USSR. By April the division was at Vladimir and it was disbanded, along with 125th Corps, by the beginning of June. A delegation of the 175th had been sent to Berlin to take part in the second Victory Day parade in May. Gervasiev had an extensive postwar career and retired as a lieutenant general on November 25, 1961.
