= Stepan Akimov =

Soviet general and army commander

Stepan Dmitrievich Akimov
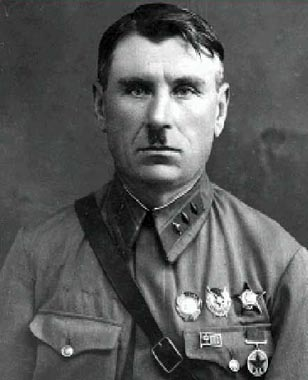
- Born: 1896; Kholmsky Uyezd, Pskov Governorate, Russian Empire
- Died: October 29, 1941 (aged 44–45) Soviet Union
- Allegiance: Russian Empire; Soviet Union
- Branch: Imperial Russian Army; Soviet Red Army
- Service years: 1916–1917 (Russian Empire); 1918–1941 (Soviet Union)
- Rank: lieutenant general
- Commands: 48th Army; 43rd Army
- Conflicts: World War I Russian Civil War; Winter War; World War II

Stepan Dmitrievich Akimov (Russian: Степа́н Дми́триевич Аки́мов; 1896 – October 29, 1941) was a Soviet general and army commander.

He was born in what is now Pskov Oblast. He fought in the Imperial Russian Army in World War I before going over to the Bolsheviks.

During World War II, he commanded the 48th Army (August 4-31, 1941) and the 43rd Army (October 10–29, 1941). He died in a plane crash on October 29, 1941, near the village of Golodyaevka, Penza Region.

He was a recipient of the Order of Lenin, the Order of the Red Banner, and the Order of the Red Star. He also received the Jubilee Medal "XX Years of the Workers' and Peasants' Red Army".

== Bibliography ==
- Vozhakin, Mikhail Georgievich, ed. (2005). Великая Отечественная. Командармы. Военный биографический словарь [The Great Patriotic War: Army Commanders: Military Biographical Dictionary] (in Russian). Moscow: Kuchkovo Pole. pp. 28–29. ISBN 5860901135.

Military offices
Preceded by new creation	Commander of the 48th Army; August 4-31, 1941	Succeeded by Maksim Antoniuk
Preceded by Pyotr Sobennikov	Commander of the 43rd Army; October 10–29, 1941	Succeeded by Konstantin Golubev
