= Konstantin Golubev =

Konstantin Dmitriyevich Golubev
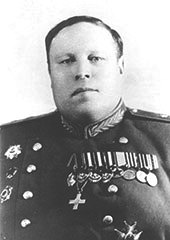
- Born: 27 March 1896; Petrovsk, Saratov Governorate, Russian Empire (modern Petrovsk, Saratov Oblast)
- Died: 9 June 1956 (aged 60) Moscow, Soviet Union
- Allegiance: Russian Empire; Soviet Union
- Branch: Imperial Russian Army; Soviet Red Army
- Rank: lieutenant general
- Commands: 10th Army (Soviet Union); 13th Army (Soviet Union); 43rd Army (Soviet Union)
- Conflicts: World War I; Russian Civil War; World War II; Operation Barbarossa; Battle of Smolensk (1943)

Konstantin Dmitriyevich Golubev (Russian: Константи́н Дми́триевич Го́лубев; 27 March 1896 – 9 June 1956) was a Soviet general and army commander.

He was born in Petrovsk, Saratov Governorate (in present-day Saratov Oblast). He fought in World War I in the Imperial Russian Army before going over to the Bolsheviks. He was a recipient of the Order of Lenin, the Order of the Red Banner, the Order of Kutuzov, the Medal "For the Defence of Moscow", the Medal "For the Victory over Germany in the Great Patriotic War 1941–1945", the Medal "For the Victory over Japan", the Jubilee Medal "XX Years of the Workers' and Peasants' Red Army", the Jubilee Medal "30 Years of the Soviet Army and Navy" and the Medal "In Commemoration of the 800th Anniversary of Moscow". He also received the Virtuti Militari and the Order of the Cross of Grunwald from Poland. He died in Moscow.

Preceded by Stepan Akimov	Commander of the Soviet 43rd Army; 29 October 1941 – 22 May 1944	Succeeded by Afanasy Beloborodov

== Sources ==
- Коллектив авторов. «Великая Отечественная. Командармы. Военный биографический словарь» — М.; Жуковский: Кучково поле, 2005. ISBN 5-86090-113-5
