= Maksim Antoniuk =

Belarusian general (1895–1961)

Maksim Antanavich Antoniuk
- Максім Антонавіч Антанюк
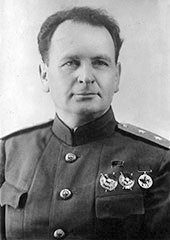
- Born: 19 October 1895; Matsy, Grodno Governorate, Russian Empire
- Died: 30 July 1961 (aged 65); Moscow, USSR
- Military career
- Allegiance: Russian Empire; Soviet Union
- Branch: Imperial Russian Army; Red Army
- Service years: (Russia) 1915 – 1917 (Soviet Union) 1917 – 1947
- Rank: General-lieutenant
- Commands: 4th Rifle Division; 5th Rifle Division; 3rd Rifle Division; 8th Rifle Corps; 48th Army; 60th Army
- Conflicts: World War I Russian Civil War; World War II
- Awards: Order of Lenin

Maksim Antonovich Antoniuk (Belarusian: Максім Антонавіч Антанюк, Russian: Максим Антонович Антонюк; 19 October 1895 – 30 July 1961) was a Belarusian military general, a World War II Army commander and a politician.

== Early life, World War I, and the Russian Civil War ==
He was born in a village near Macy, Pruzhany District in Brest, Belarus.

In 1915 he was appointed to the Russian army, where he graduated from the Moscow School of Warrant Officers 3. He took part in World War I on the Northern Front. He ended the war as a lieutenant.

In 1917 he joined the Red Guards, and in 1918 the Red Army. During the Civil War in Russia he held the following positions: head of the topographical department, deputy commander and commander of a combat sector, representative of the Military Revolutionary Council, commander of a regiment.

== Interwar period ==
In 1921 he graduated from the Frunze Military Academy. In the years 1924 - 1930 he was successively commander of the 4th Turkestan Rifle Division, 5th Vitebsk and Czechoslovak Proletariat Rifle Division and 3rd Crimean Rifle Division. In the period from October 1930 to February 1931 he was a lecturer at the Frunze Military Academy, then commander and commissar of the 8th Rifle Corps.

In June 1937 he was commander of the Siberian Military District. In June 1938 he was arrested by the NKVD on charges of treason, but in December 1938 he was rehabilitated and released. He was then a senior lecturer in tactics at the Frunze Military Academy and later inspector of the infantry of the Red Army. On 2 August 1940 he was deputy inspector general of the infantry of the Red Army.

== World War II ==
After the German attack on the Soviet Union, he dealt with the formation of infantry divisions and the creation of battalions to restore the depleted divisions on the battlefield.

In August 1941 he was commander of the Petrozavodsk Operational Group within the 7th Army and on 1 September 1941, he became commander of the 48th Army of the Leningrad Front, fighting on the approaches to Leningrad, until its dissolution on 14 September 1941.

In the period from October 1941 to June 1942 he remained unassigned at the disposal of the commander of the Leningrad Front.

In June 1942 he became commander of the 60th Army built from the 3rd Reserve Army. Since September 1942, he was deputy commander and then commander of the 2nd Reserve Army subordinate to the Supreme Command of the Red Army. In April 1943, he was deputy commander of the Steppe Military District and after the transformation of the District in the Steppe Front, deputy commander of the front.

Since October 1943 years the deputy commander of the Baltic Sea Front, then 2nd Baltic Front, a position he held until the end of the war.

== Later life ==
After the end of World War II, from October 1945 to May 1947 he was the deputy commander for training in the Lvov Military District.
In 1947 he was transferred to the reserve. He died in Moscow and was buried at the Novodevichy Cemetery.

== Promotion ==
- Komkor (20 November 1935)
- Lieutenant General (4 June 1940)

== Awards ==
Antoniuk received the following awards:

- Order of Lenin
- Order of the Red Banner (three times)
- Order of Suvorov kl. II (04/06/1945)
- Order of the Patriotic War class. I (08.27.1943)

== Bibliography ==
- Praca zbiorowa: Великая Отечественная. Командармы. Военный биографический словарь. Moskwa: Кучково поле, 2005, s. 14–15. ISBN 5-86090-113-5. (ros.)
- Praca zbiorowa: Командный и начальствующий состав Красной Армии в 1940-1941 гг. Структура и кадры центрального аппарата H КО СССР, военных округов и общевойсковых армий. Документы и материалы.. Moskwa: 2005, s. 89, 112. ISBN 5-94381-137-0.
