= 22nd Breakthrough Artillery Division =

- Active: January 1943 – June 1946
- Country: Soviet Union
- Branch: Red Army / Soviet Army
- Type: Artillery
- Engagements: World War II; Gomel–Rechitsa offensive; Kalinkovichi–Mozyr offensive; Bobruysk offensive; Lublin–Brest offensive; Vistula–Oder offensive; Berlin offensive
- Decorations: Order of the Red Banner; Order of Suvorov; Order of Kutuzov; Order of Bogdan Khmelnitsky
- Battle honours: Gomel

Commanders
- Notable commanders: Prokhor Ivanov; Kuzma Korolyov; Dmitry Zrazhevsky

The 22nd Breakthrough Artillery Division (Russian: 22-я артиллерийская дивизия прорыва) was an artillery division of the Red Army during World War II.

== History ==
The division headquarters was formed in early January 1943 in the Moscow Military District under the command of Colonel Prokhor Ivanov, who was transferred to command the 16th Breakthrough Artillery Division on 29 June. Colonel Kuzma Korolyov, former commander of the 16th Breakthrough Artillery Division, took command of the 22nd Division on 30 May while it was in the Reserve of the Supreme High Command. The division was then sent to the Belorussian Front, where it took part in the Gomel–Rechitsa and Kalinkovichi–Mozyr offensive operations as part of the 65th Army. The division received the Gomel honorific in recognition of its performance in the liberation of that city. In recognition of its performance, the division received the Order of the Red Banner on 15 January 1944. For successful command performance, Korolyov was awarded the Order of the Red Banner on 23 February, but he was relieved of command on 3 April for unsuccessful fighting near Mogilev. Colonel Dmitry Zrazhevsky took command of the division on 10 April. The division was transferred to the 48th Army of the 1st Belorussian Front in June and took part in the Bobruysk offensive. After the conclusion of the offensive, the division was withdrawn to the front reserve, and then dispatched to the 28th Army. Subsequently, its units supported the troops of the army in the Lublin–Brest offensive, during the forcing of the Grivda and Shchara rivers, the liberation of Brest, and the advance into eastern Poland. On reaching the Warsaw suburb of Praga, the 22nd Division was shifted to strengthen the 47th Army. With the army, the division participated in the storming of Praga, and then in the elimination of the Vistula–Bug–Narew bridgehead. For its contribution to the storming of Praga, the division was decorated with the Order of Suvorov, 2nd class, on 31 October. In early December, the division was transferred to the 8th Guards Army and relocated to the Magnuszew bridgehead, then transferred to the 5th Shock Army. As part of the latter, the 22nd took part in the breakthrough of the German defenses during the Vistula–Oder offensive and reached the Polish–German border on 4 February 1945. For its role in the breakthrough south of Warsaw, the division received the Order of Kutuzov, 2nd class, on 19 February. At the end of March, it was transferred to the 33rd Army, taking part in the Berlin Offensive and the encirclement of German forces southeast of Berlin. During late April and early May the division supported the troops of the 5th Shock Army in street fighting during the storming of Berlin. For its performance in the drive on Berlin, the division was awarded the Order of Bogdan Khmelnitsky, 2nd class, on 28 May. After the end of the war, the division continued to serve as part of the Group of Soviet Occupation Forces in Germany until its disbandment in July 1946.
