= 48th Army =

Field army of the Soviet Red Army

- 48-я армия
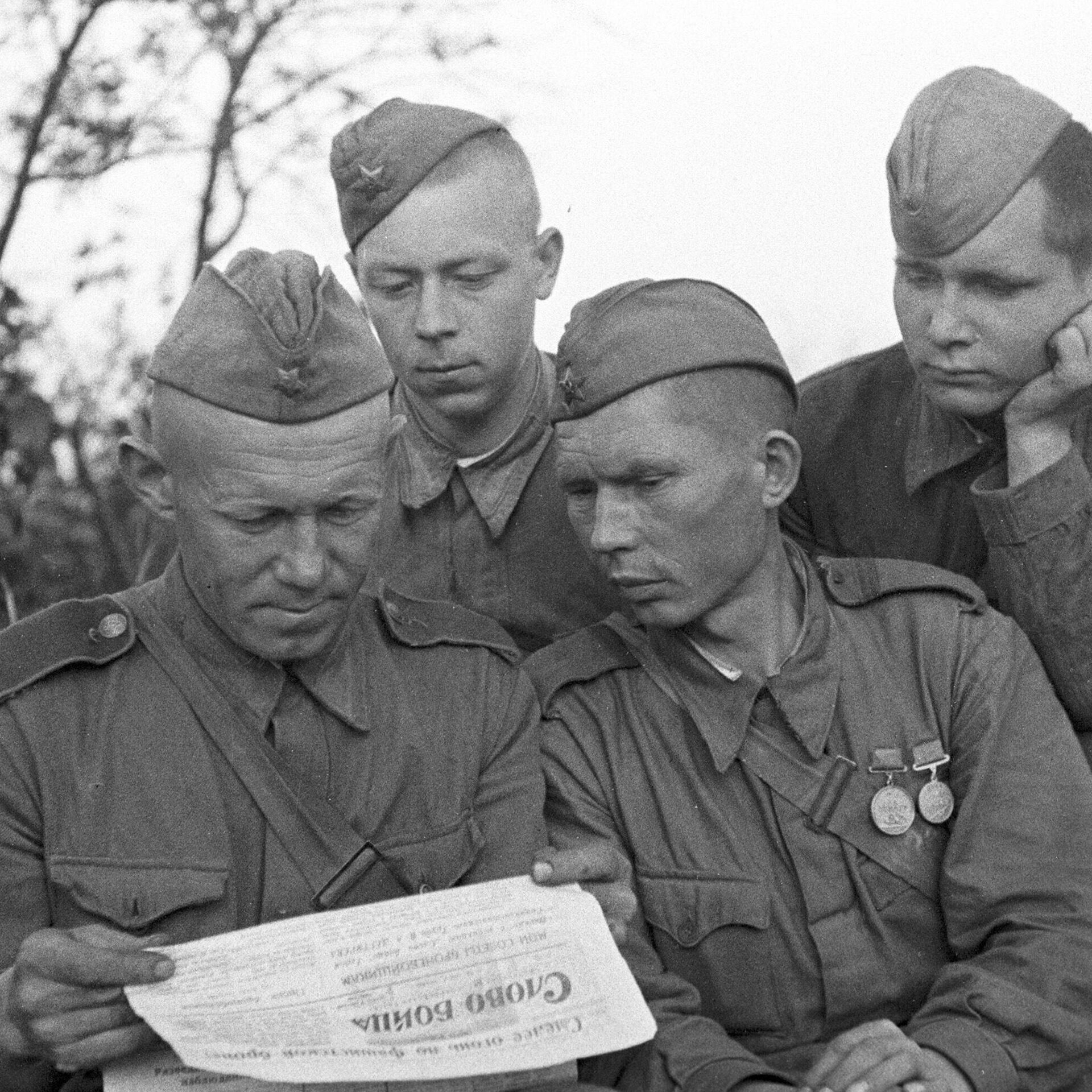
- Soldiers of the 48th Army reading a military newspaper.
- Active: 7 Aug 1941 – 14 Sep 1941 (1st Formation); 20 Apr 1942 – Sep 1945 (2nd Formation)
- Country: Soviet Union
- Branch: Red Army
- Type: Infantry
- Size: Field army three to twelve divisions
- Part of: Northwestern Front; Northern Front; Leningrad Front; Bryansk Front; Central Front; 1st Belorussian Front; 2nd Belorussian Front; 3rd Belorussian Front
- Engagements: World War II: Leningrad Strategic Defensive; Operation Kutuzov; Battle of the Dnieper; Operation Bagration; East Prussian Offensive

Commanders
- Notable commanders: Nikolai Gusev

The 48th Army (Russian: 48-я армия) was a field army of the Soviet Red Army, active from 1941 to 1945. The army was first formed in August 1941, and fought in the Leningrad Strategic Defensive Operation. The army suffered heavy losses and was disbanded in early September. Its remnants were moved to the 54th Army. Reformed in April 1942 on the Bryansk Front, the army fought in the Maloarkhangelsk Offensive in the winter of 1943. It was sent to the Central Front in March and defended the northern face of the Kursk Bulge. During the summer, it fought in Operation Kutuzov and the Chernigov—Pripyat Offensive. From November, the army fought in the Gomel-Rechitsa Offensive. The army fought in Operation Bagration from June 1944. During the offensive, the army captured Zhlobin and Bobruisk and was on the Narew by early September. During early 1945, the army fought in the East Prussian Offensive and ended the war in East Prussia during May. The army was transferred to Poland in July 1945 and its headquarters was used to form the Kazan Military District in September.

== First Formation ==
The army was established on 7 August 1941 from the Novgorod Operational Group, under command of Lt. Gen. Stepan Akimov, its initial order of battle was as follows:

- 1st Leningrad People's Militia Division (Kirov Raion)
- 70th Rifle Division
- 128th Rifle Division
- 237th Rifle Division
- 1st Separate Mountain Rifle Brigade
- 21st Tank Division

The army was assigned to Northwestern Front and was responsible for the front's left flank north of Lake Ilmen. It also had under command the Ilmen Detachment of Ships. On 12 August the army, along with the 11th, 27th and 34th Armies, began a series of assaults against the German X Army Corps near Staraya Russa. These attacks failed to regain much territory but delayed the German advance on Leningrad by a further week.

Following this, the 48th took up positions forward of Luga and Novgorod as part of the Luga defense line. That line was penetrated in the renewed German advance, and Luga fell on 20 August, with heavy Soviet casualties; the army was a wreck with only 6,235 men, 5,043 rifles and 31 guns remaining. It was transferred to the Northern Front and ordered to defend the Gruzino-Liuban sector southeast of Leningrad. On 23 August Northern Front was subdivided, and 48th Army became part of the new Leningrad Front.

On 1 September the 48th comprised the 128th and 311th Rifle Divisions, the mountain brigade, the 541st Gun Artillery Regiment of the Reserve of the Supreme High Command and the 21st Tank Division. At this time, it was commanded by Lieutenant General Maxim Antoniuk. Heavy attacks by the German XXXIX Motorized Corps forced the army to abandon Mga, a key railway link. Akimov was ordered to retake the town, which he did with the help of a fresh division of NKVD border guards, but the town was lost again the next day. During the first week of September the 20th Motorized Division, reinforced with elements of 12th Panzer Division, ground its way northwards against the resistance of the mountain brigade and the NKVD men before capturing Shlisselburg on Lake Ladoga on 8 September, isolating Leningrad, with the bulk of the army outside, to the east. On 12 September, the remnants of 48th Army were disbanded, being reassigned to the new 54th Army.

== Second Formation ==
The army was formed for a second time from 28th Mechanized Corps (Second Formation) Headquarters on 20 April 1942, part of the Bryansk Front. It included the 1st Guards Rifle Division, a mortar regiment and a separate engineer battalion. The army was commanded by Major General Grigory Khalyuzin. On 1 June, the army included the 6th Guards, 8th, 211th and 280th Rifle Divisions. It also included the 118th and 122nd Rifle Brigades as well as the 80th and 202nd Tank Brigades. Artillery and engineer units were also included. Air support was provided by the 879th Light Bomber Aviation Regiment. Army troops took up positions on the Korobka River west of Novosil. From the end of June to July, the army fought in heavy defensive battles in the Yeletsky direction. During the battles, the army was able to hold the German troops at the line of Bolshoy Malinovets, Zalegosh, Setenyovo and Svetitsky. On 27 August the deputy commander of the army, Major General Konstantin Ignatievich Novik, was killed in action at Dishnia Station during a heavy enemy artillery raid. In February 1943, the army launched an offensive in the Maloarkhangelsk direction. On 12 February, Lieutenant General Prokofy Romanenko took command of the army. By 23 February it was in position southwest of Novosil and northwest of Maloarkhangelsk.

On 13 March, the army was transferred to the Central Front. During the summer and fall of 1943, the army fought in battles on the northern face of the Kursk Bulge, Operation Kutuzov and the Chernigov-Pripyat Offensive. Continuing to advance towards Gomel along with the 61st and 65th Armies, the 48th Army cleared the left bank of the Sozh of German troops by 10 October. The army then pursued the German troops to the south of Gomel. On 20 October, it transferred to the Belorussian Front and from the first week of November fought in the expansion of the bridgehead on the right bank of the Sozh. From 19 November, it fought in the Gomel-Rechitsa Offensive. During early 1944, the army carried out an attack towards Bobruisk.

At the outset of Operation Bagration on 23 June 1944, the 48th Army had been substantially reinforced, and was comprised as follows:

- 29th Rifle Corps (102nd, 217th Rifle Divisions)
- 42nd Rifle Corps (137th, 170th, 399th Rifle Divisions)
- 53rd Rifle Corps (17th, 73rd, 96th Rifle Divisions)
- 197th Rifle Division
- 115th Fortified Region
- 22nd Artillery Division (13th and 59th Light Artillery Brigades, 63rd Howitzer Artillery Brigade)
- 68th Light Artillery Brigade
- 220th Guards Antitank Artillery Regiment
- 479th Mortar Regiment
- 31st Antiaircraft Artillery Division (1376th, 1380th, 1386th, 1392nd Antiaircraft Artillery Regiments)
- 461st Antiaircraft Artillery Regiment
- 42nd and 231st Separate Tank Regiments
- 341st Guards Heavy Self-Propelled Artillery Regiment
- 713th, 1890th and 1897th Self-Propelled Artillery Regiments
- 39th Separate Armored Train Division
- 57th Engineering-Sapper Brigade
- 104th Pontoon Bridge Battalion
- 142nd Separate Flamethrower Company

The main mission of the army in the initial stages was to screen the three German divisions in the triangle formed by the Dniepr and Berezina rivers, while assisting the breakthrough of 3rd Army to the north with an assault by 42nd and 29th Rifle Corps against the German positions north of Rogachev; this would form the northern pincer seeking to encircle the German 9th Army. By the evening of 24 June the Soviet corps were 5 km west of that town, the 296th Infantry Division had been overwhelmed, and the breakthrough was being exploited by 9th Tank Corps into the German rear. Advancing towards Bobruisk, the army captured Zhlobin on 26 June and along with the 65th Army destroyed German troops surrounded in the Bobruisk area. On 29 June, army troops captured Bobruisk. Continuing the attack towards Baranovichi and Brest, 28th, 65th and 48th Armies defeated German troops around Baranovichi during three days of fighting. At the end of July, the army was south of Surazh. During August and early September, the army advanced 150 kilometers and reached the Narew by 8 September in the area of Ruzhany and Pułtusk. The army went on the defensive and transferred to the 2nd Belorussian Front on 22 September 1944. On 15 December 1944, Lieutenant General Nikolai Gusev became the army's commander.

During early 1945, the army fought in the East Prussian Offensive. On 11 February it was moved to the 3rd Belorussian Front. It advanced to the Frisches Haff on 25 March, where it went on the defensive. From 1 to 5 May, the army led attacks on the Baltic coast. In July 1945 it was moved from Germany to Poland, and in September 1945 its headquarters was used to form the Kazan Military District (ru:Казанский военный округ).

== Commanders ==
- Lieutenant General Stepan Akimov (04.08.1941 - 31.08.1941),
- Lieutenant General Maksim Antoniuk (01.09.1941 - 12.09.1941),
- Major General Grigory Khalyuzin (03.05.1942 - 11.02.1943),
- Lieutenant General Prokofy Romanenko (12.02.1943 - 15.12.1944),
- Lieutenant General Nikolai Gusev (15.12.1944 - 09.05.1945), From 05.05.1945 Colonel-General
