= Dmitry Onuprienko =

Soviet Army lieutenant general

Dmitry Platonovich Onuprienko
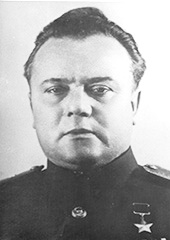
- Native name: Дмитрий Платонович Онуприенко
- Born: 25 October 1906; Shupyk, Kanevsky Uyezd, Kiev Governorate, Russian Empire
- Died: 22 November 1977 (aged 71) Moscow, Soviet Union
- Buried: Kuntsevo Cemetery
- Allegiance: Soviet Union
- Branch: Soviet Border Troops; Red Army
- Service years: 1925–1957
- Rank: Lieutenant General
- Commands: 33rd Army; 6th Guards Rifle Division; 24th Rifle Corps; 10th Mechanized Division; 13th Rifle Corps; 87th Rifle Corps; 3rd Mountain Rifle Corps
- Conflicts: Winter War; World War II; Battle of Moscow; Battle of Kursk; Operation Kutuzov; Battle of Kiev; Lvov-Sandomierz Offensive; Berlin Offensive
- Awards: Hero of the Soviet Union; Order of Lenin (2); Order of the Red Banner (5); Order of Kutuzov 1st class; Order of Kutuzov 2nd class; Order of Suvorov 2nd class; Order of the Red Star

Dmitry Platonovich Onuprienko (Russian: Дмитрий Платонович Онуприенко; 25 October 1906 – 22 November 1977) was a Soviet Army lieutenant general and Hero of the Soviet Union. Onuprienko fought during World War II at the Battle of Moscow, the Battle of Kursk and the Battle of Berlin. He commanded several corps after the war.

== Early life ==
Dmitry Onuprienko was born on 25 October 1906 in Shupyk village, in the Kanevsky Uyezd of Kiev Governorate to a peasant family of Ukrainian ethnicity. In 1925, he graduated from seven grades and was drafted into the Red Army in September.

== Military service ==
=== Interwar ===
In 1928, Onuprienko graduated from the Kiev Military Infantry School. He became an assistant outpost platoon commander of the Soviet Border Troops and then chief of the 23rd Border Detachment. In 1930, he joined the Communist Party of the Soviet Union. Between 1932 and 1935, he was a drill instructor in the 2nd Border Detachment. Onuprienko graduated from the Frunze Military Academy in 1938. In November, he became senior assistant to the chief of the 1st Division of the educational institutions of the Main Directorate of Border and Internal Troops. In March 1939, he became deputy chief of NKVD Escort Troops.

=== World War II ===
During the Winter War, Onuprienko was deputy commander of an NKVD special unit. In March, he became the NKVD's deputy chief of operations. He became the chief of staff of the Moscow Military District in June. In July, he was ordered to form the 33rd Army in the Kalinin Oblast from NKVD units and militia divisions. On 17 July, Onuprienko formed the headquarters and assumed command of the army, which was positioned on the Mozhaysk defensive line. The army suffered heavy losses during the Battle of Vyazma during October, and Onuprienko was demoted to deputy commander, being replaced by Mikhail Yefremov. Onuprienko was awarded the Order of the Red Banner on 2 January 1942. He fought in the Battle of Moscow until March 1942, when he was sent to study at the Higher Academic Courses at the Higher Military Academy.

After graduation from them at the end of the year, he became chief of staff of the 3rd Reserve Army on the Kalinin Front and was promoted to major general on 7 December. On 15 January 1943, he became the chief of staff of the 2nd Tank Army and fought in the Dmitriyev-Sevsk Offensive. On 28 June, he became the commander of the 6th Guards Rifle Division. He led the division during the Battle of Kursk, where it successfully defended Ponyri. For his leadership at Kursk, Onuprienko was awarded the Order of the Red Banner on 14 July. Onuprienko was awarded the Order of Suvorov 2nd class on 23 September 1943. During the Chernigov-Pripyat Offensive, he organized the division's crossing of the Dnieper. On 30 September, the division crossed at the villages of Teremtsy and Verkhnye Zary. The advance elements of the division crossed the river and occupied a small bridgehead. German troops reportedly did not expect the crossing to take place in that area, but soon launched counterattacks. Elements of the division reportedly repulsed all of the counterattacks and then broke through the German line in the area between the Dnieper and the Pripyat River. The division then crossed the Pripyat, captured a bridgehead at Yampil and continued to attack to the west. On 16 October, he was awarded the title Hero of the Soviet Union and the Order of Lenin for his actions during the offensive.

Onuprienko continued to lead the division during the Battle of Kiev, the Zhitomir–Berdichev Offensive and the Lvov–Sandomierz Offensive. On 21 July 1944, he was awarded his third Order of the Red Banner. In August, he became commander of the 24th Rifle Corps of the 13th Army. He led the corps during the rest of the Lvov–Sandomierz Offensive. On 3 November, Onuprienko was awarded the Order of the Red Star. In 1945, the corps fought in the Vistula–Oder Offensive and the Lower Silesian Offensive. On 6 April, he was awarded the Order of Kutuzov 2nd class.

=== Postwar ===
On 27 June, he was promoted to lieutenant general and awarded the Order of Kutuzov 1st class. He was awarded his fourth Order of the Red Banner on 6 November. From June 1946, he was the commander of the 10th Mechanized Division of the Carpathian Military District. Onuprienko was transferred to command the 13th Rifle Corps of the Transcaucasian Military District in August, then the 87th Rifle Corps of the Far Eastern Military District in September 1947. Onuprienko was awarded the Order of Lenin on 15 November 1950 for 25 years of service. Onuprienko entered the higher academic courses at the Higher Military Academy in October 1952. After completing the courses on 10 October 1953, he commanded the 3rd Mountain Rifle Corps of the Carpathian Military District. On 26 October 1955, he was awarded his fifth Order of the Red Banner. In March 1957, he retired.

== Later life ==
After his retirement, Onuprienko lived in Moscow. He died on 22 November 1977 and was buried in Kuntsevo Cemetery.
