= 148th Rifle Division =

148th Rifle Division (September 15, 1939 – July 1945)
- Active: 1939–1945
- Country: Soviet Union
- Branch: Red Army
- Type: Infantry
- Size: Division
- Engagements: Operation Barbarossa; Siege of Mogilev; Operation Typhoon; Battle of Bryansk (1941); Voronezh–Kastornoye offensive Oryol offensive Battle of Kursk; Battle of Kiev (1943); Chernigov-Pripyat operation Rovno–Lutsk offensive Zhitomir–Berdichev offensive Lvov-Sandomierz Offensive; Vistula–Oder offensive Lower Silesian offensive Upper Silesian offensive Prague offensive
- Decorations: Order of the Red Banner; Order of Suvorov
- Battle honours: Chernigov

Commanders
- Notable commanders: Col. Filipp Mikhailovich Cherokmanov; Maj. Gen. Andrei Avksentevich Mishchenko; Col. Mikhail Ivanovich Goltsov

The 148th Rifle Division was formed as an infantry division of the Red Army on September 15, 1939, in the Volga Military District, based on the shtat (table of organization and equipment) of later that month. At the outbreak of the war it was still in this District, but was soon moving toward Gomel to join the 21st Army of Western Front. While still en route it was reassigned to 13th Army in the Mogilev area, and it would remain in this Army for most of the next two years. During the July fighting in this area it lost a rifle regiment and most of another, and was pulled back for rebuilding, but not far enough to prevent its front being penetrated in early August. Later that month the Army was transferred to the new Bryansk Front, and was tasked with the defense of the Desna River; the 148th was moved to the rebuilding 3rd Army, which was also part of this defense. After further losses near Novhorod-Siverskyi it was again moved to the reserves for replenishment. During the early stages of Operation Typhoon what remained of the 148th was encircled with its Army, but in the second week of October managed to stage a breakout and escaped being disbanded. It soon returned to 13th Army and spent all of 1942 on a relatively quiet sector, rebuilding and re-equipping. In early 1943 it took part in the encirclement of Axis forces near Kastornoye before advancing west toward Kursk and Oryol as part of Central Front, but it and the rest of 13th Army were halted before reaching the latter objective, and spent several months fortifying their positions in anticipation of the German summer offensive. When the attack came in July the division defended successfully in front of Maloarkhangelsk on its Army's right flank. When the Red Army went over to the counteroffensive the 148th advanced through northeastern Ukraine and won a battle honor in the process. In October it was transferred with its Army to 1st Ukrainian Front, and in November to 60th Army; it would remain under these formations for the duration of the war. As it advanced on Shepetivka and beyond in February and March of 1944 it was awarded first the Order of the Red Banner and then the Order of Suvorov. In April one of its regiments was awarded an honorific for the taking of Ternopil. After several inactive months the division participated in the Lviv-Sandomierz offensive and all its regiments received honors or decorations for their successes in the fighting for the former place. During the winter offensive in 1945 the 148th, with its Army, took part in two campaigns to seize Silesia. After difficult fighting in the vicinity of Oppeln and Ratibor in March the division was transferred with its Army to 4th Ukrainian Front and spent the last month of hostilities advancing through the Carpathian Mountains toward Prague. Following the German surrender it was moved back to Poland and was disbanded in July.

== Formation ==
The 148th officially began forming on September 15, 1939, in the Volga Military District. The 496th Rifle Regiment was based at Engels, the 507th Rifle and 366th Artillery Regiments, plus the 199th Medical/Sanitation Battalion, were at Pugachyov, while the 654th Rifle Regiment was at Uralsk. At the outbreak of the war with Germany its order of battle was as follows:

- 496th Rifle Regiment
- 507th Rifle Regiment
- 654th Rifle Regiment
- 326th Artillery Regiment (until November 8, 1941, and then from November 29)
- 226th Antitank Battalion
- 142nd Reconnaissance Company
- 163rd Sapper Battalion
- 173rd Signal Battalion (later 417th Signal Company)
- 199th Medical/Sanitation Battalion
- 177th Chemical Defense (Anti-gas) Company
- 96th Motor Transport Company
- 345th Field Bakery
- 247th Divisional Veterinary Hospital
- 245th Field Postal Station
- 687th Field Office of the State Bank

Col. Filipp Mikhailovich Cherokmanov took command of the division on the day it started forming; he had previously led the 157th Rifle Regiment of the 53rd Rifle Division, which had been stationed at Engels since 1935. As of June 22, the 148th was part of the 63rd Rifle Corps, along with the 53rd and the 167th Rifle Divisions. This Corps was assigned to 21st Army in the Reserve of the STAVKA High Command. Before arriving at the front the 53rd and 148th were reassigned to 45th Rifle Corps, still in 21st Army. The division, although far from full strength, was already moving in the direction of Gomel, becoming part of the active army on July 2. 13th Army was headquartered at Mogilev. The division would remain in this Army until December 1943.

=== Battles in Belarus ===
Marshal S. K. Timoshenko had taken over command of Western Front on July 2. 21st Army, which was anchoring the Front's southern flank, launched a partially-successful reconnaissance-in-force on July 5, and then a series of resolute and somewhat effective counterattacks against the right flank of 2nd Panzer Group in the area of Rahachow and Zhlobin. On July 7 45th Corps, now consisting of the 148th and 187th Rifle Divisions, was reassigned to 13th Army in Western Front.

2nd Panzer Group renewed its assault on July 10, when two divisions of XXIV Motorized Corps crossed the Dniepr River at and near Bykhaw, 29–32km south of Mogilev. This had been partially anticipated by Timoshenko in his intelligence summary of the previous night, but he had expected the assault to be made at Rahachow. As a result, only the 187th had been left to defend the sector north of Bykhaw. After four hours of fighting the XXIV Corps had seized a sizeable bridgehead and, after driving off Soviet forces, began construction of two bridges. That evening, Timoshenko reported that the 148th had joined the 187th and both were fighting against German units that had crossed in the Barsuki and Borkolobovo region, while at 1330 hours German tanks had been seen along the Mogilev–Novy-Bykhaw highway.

The next day, the remainder of 2nd Panzer Group also crossed the Dniepr. Timoshenko reported that 13th Army was holding at Barsuki and Borkolobovo, with the 148th still attempting to concentrate while also engaging the German forces in the bridgehead; the 137th Rifle Division had now joined 45th Corps. On July 12, Western Front headquarters stated that 13th Army's positions had been penetrated to a depth of 20km. The commander of 2nd Panzer Group, Col. Gen. H. Guderian, now directed the XXIV Corps to move eastward through Chavusy and Krychaw to Roslavl. The Corps was also supposed to protect the Group's right flank. This penetration had forced a gap between the 13th and the adjacent 20th Army, and a major portion of the former was threatened with encirclement in the Mogilev area.

=== Timoshenko's Offensive ===
In the afternoon of July 12 the STAVKA realized that desperate measures were required to restore the situation, including the need to "[c]onduct active operations along the Gomel' and Bobruisk axis to threaten the rear of the enemy's Mogilev grouping." Timoshenko and his staff had already issued a number of preliminary orders, which included directions to 13th Army to "destroy the enemy forces penetrating east of the Dnepr River and defend the Dnepr River line." No part of Timoshenko's plan was even remotely feasible. Only 21st Army scored a partial success when it managed to project a sizeable force across the Dniepr to briefly threaten German communications with Babruysk.

13th Army was by now largely shattered by XXIV and XXXXVI Motorized Corps deep in its rear. Its commander, Lt. Gen. F. N. Remezov, was wounded on July 13 and replaced by Lt. Gen. V. F. Gerasimenko, who began withdrawing most of the Army east toward the Sozh River. However, the understrength 507th Rifle Regiment came under command of 172nd Rifle Division as part of the Mogilev Group which was to defend that city under command of Maj. Gen. F. A. Bakunin. Despite these facts, Timoshenko reported to the STAVKA that 20th and 13th Armies would eliminate the penetration on the Bykhaw axis using flank attacks by July 16. He also stated that "I am assigning the decisive attack to 13th Army's units as the most important mission and a matter of honor." In the event, apart from 21st Army, Timoshenko's offensive never came together as the panzers disrupted all his plans.

=== Siege of Mogilev ===
Mogilev was a thorn in the side of Guderian, as it divided the bridgeheads of his two panzer corps over the Dniepr. It had already been made into a fortress that would be costly to take by frontal assault, as the first attacks proved. Instead, the panzers advanced early on July 13 for the Sozh, 97km farther east. By dusk on July 15 the XXIV Corps had created a wide salient from south of Mogilev east to the Sozh and back to the Dniepr while also straining to contain the roughly 100,000 men encircled in the city. Infantry from 2nd Army was urgently needed to relieve the armor, but until July 17 the task fell to the mobile troops. It was only on this date that the headquarters of the 148th completed its arrival near the front, in the vicinity of Krychaw, which was also the new location of Gerasimenko's headquarters. Meanwhile, the 496th Rifle Regiment had been encircled near Stary Bykhaw and forced to break out, with only some 400 personnel reaching friendly lines. As 13th Army withdrew and 2nd Panzer advanced, often on the same or parallel routes, Red Army troops sometimes caused havoc in the German "rear". On July 16 the 507th Regiment was reported as being on a long line from 24km south-southeast to 58km southeast of Mogilev, fighting as part of the 172nd Division's 747th Rifle Regiment. The city would finally fall on July 26, with the loss of the regiment.

As Western Front had become unwieldy, on July 23 a new Central Front was formed, to include the reformed 3rd Army, 13th, and 21st Armies. The 148th remained in 45th Corps, which also contained the 6th, 121st, and 137th Rifle Divisions. 13th Army was now under command of Maj. Gen. K. D. Golubev. Central Front was intended to cover the junction between Western and Southwestern Fronts while also operating toward Gomel and Babruysk. Concurrent with this, Timoshenko issued an order which read, in part:

Withdraw the remnants of 7th and 17th [Mechanized Corps] and 24th, 137th, 132nd, 148th, and 160th RDs to the Sukhinichi region, and form two [100-series] tank divisions from the mechanized corps. Entrust 4th Army's headquarters with the task of forming the formations [divisions] indicated above.

The 148th, having lost one regiment and most of another, would be rebuilt as best as possible under the circumstances.

=== Guderian's Roslavl counterattack ===
In an effort to break through to his pocketed armies at Smolensk, Timoshenko created a shock group from 28th Army named after the Army commander, Lt. Gen. V. Ya. Kachalov. Group Kachalov was to advance toward Pochinok starting on July 23 and consisted of the 145th and 149th Rifle Divisions, 104th Tank Division, and supporting units. The attack made slow progress due to lack of training and experience, as German reinforcements began to arrive. By July 29 it had effectively ground to a halt.

Guderian had been watching events and looking for an opening. In the morning of August 1 the 3rd and 4th Panzer Divisions began a counterattack aimed at Roslavl with the intention of linking up with IX Army Corps attacking south from Pochinok. Late that day Timoshenko was still chiding Kachalov for his failure and demanding the drive on Pochinok continue, unaware of the danger approaching. The panzers immediately penetrated between the 148th and 8th Rifle Divisions on Kachalov's left flank, then turned east along the Roslavl road, with the 3rd taking up blocking positions on the road from that place to Krychaw, and the 4th moving straight on Roslavl. The left flank of the 222nd Rifle Division was turned, and IX Corps struck southward, threatening both flanks of Group Kachalov with envelopment. This was completed on August 3 and much of Group Kachalov was destroyed.

It was apparently during this fighting that Colonel Cherokmanov was wounded and went missing in action. While under tank attack he and his staff fought back from the trenches before retreating to a forest. Cherokmanov, already wounded once, fended off German machine gunners with his revolver, was wounded again, then crawled into a thicket before making his way to the "Red Crimea" Kolkhoz. There he was sheltered by kolkhoznik N. F. Kozlov for a month, despite several searches by German troops. In August he was able to escape to friendly lines.

As Guderian pressed south with his forces a gap was formed between Central and Reserve Fronts. The STAVKA responded on August 14 by forming Bryansk Front under command of Lt. Gen. A. I. Yeryomenko. The new Front had just two armies, the 13th and 50th, with the 148th still part of the former. The Front was also expected to take part in Timoshenko's new counteroffensive against Army Group Center. 13th Army was in tatters after being defeated south of the Sozh and was withdrawing to the east with little prospect of making an offensive contribution. The next day Guderian was ordered to continue moving south with XXIV Panzer Corps over his objections, and on August 16 4th Panzer ran into stiff resistance from 13th Army at the Besed River, forcing the commitment of 10th Motorized Division. By August 18, 2nd Panzer Group had forced a salient 115km wide and 120km deep between Bryansk and Central Fronts.

=== Battles on the Desna ===
By August 19 the stage was set for an encounter battle Guderian's forces and Bryansk Front. XXXXVII Panzer Corps led with its reconnaissance elements in the direction of Bryansk and Trubchevsk. General Golubev deployed only his most combat-effective units to fortify the routes to those two places in order to provide a base for future counterattacks; this effort began on the afternoon of August 21 despite a lack of information on German positions and intentions. The defensive line was to be some 70km long on either side of Pogar, tying in with 50th Army to the north. In his Order No. 056 of that date the 148th, not being combat effective, was ordered to "withdraw to the Suzemka region [38km south-southeast of Trubchevsk] for resting and refitting." By day's end the two Armies were mostly in sound defenses along the Desna River.

Over the next two days the 17th Panzer Division continued a slow advance on Pochep, threatening to break the Desna line. At 2000 hours on August 23 Yeryomenko tasked 13th Army with the defense of that place. 48 hours later the 21st and 3rd Armies were also incorporated into his Front, and effective midnight on August 28 the 148th was transferred to the latter. This Army was under command of Maj. Gen. Ya. G. Kreizer. By now Hitler had finalized his decision to encircle Southwestern Front in and east of Kyiv, which would require Guderian's forces to drive due south and 4th Army would take over their sector as far south as Pochep. 17th Panzer was to advance through that place and Trubchevsk to guard the left flank of the advance. Pochep fell on the afternoon of August 25, while 3rd Panzer was moving on Novhorod-Siverskyi, where two bridges spanned the Desna. These were defended by the 143rd Rifle Division plus remnants of the 148th; Cherokmanov had ordered his men to construct antitank ditches and dig timbers into the ground on the far bank, covered with fire. The first effort by 6th Panzer Regiment and the motorcycle battalion to rush the bridges failed under concentrated Soviet artillery and mortar fire, plus air attacks. The river's flood plain was over 5km wide here and taking at least one bridge was vital to the German plan.

Overnight the commander of 3rd Panzer, Gen. W. Model, organized a special assault group with anti-demolition training to seize the bridges by coup-de-main, while elements of the 283rd Rifle Division reinforced the bridgehead. As the artillery preparation began, some of the hastily-raised and marginally trained defenders surrendered, while others fought half-heartedly. The armored assault group penetrated into the outskirts of the town and headed for the main bridge under cover of smoke. The raid succeeded in defusing the demolitions on the bridge and it came under German control. Soviet counterattacks, supported by tanks, were unsuccessful. On August 27 the 6th Panzer Regiment was sent on a raid to the south which took more bridges and compromised the line of the Desna.

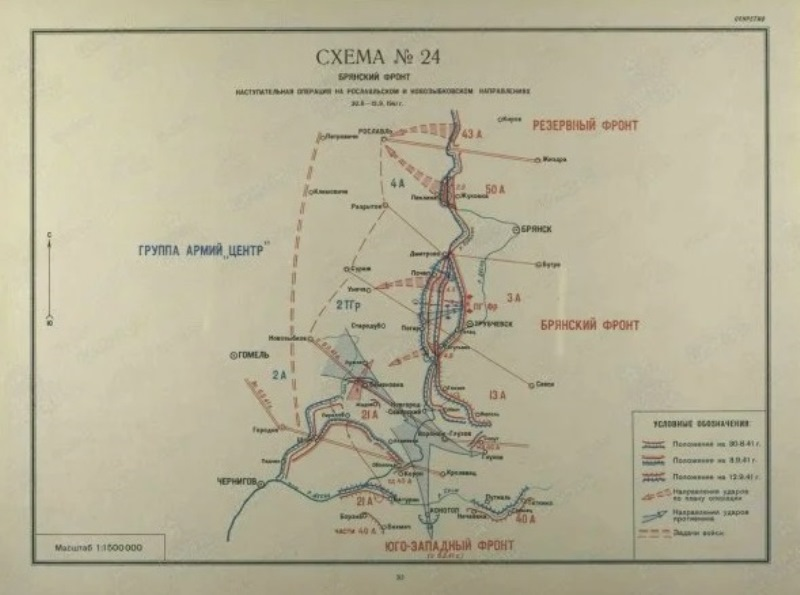
Counterattacks against 2nd Panzer Group (Roslavl-Novozibkov Offensive). Note position of 3rd Army.

The STAVKA, still not grasping the significance of Guderian's moves, demanded that Yeryomenko join in on a general counteroffensive by Western and Reserve Fronts set for August 30 and September 1. In his first orders only 13th Army would be involved, but on the morning of August 30 the STAVKA complicated the situation by ordering all of his Front take part. Specifically, the 3rd Army was to:

...attack from the Lipki, Vitovka, and Semtsy front [10-20km south of Pochep] toward Starodub and Novozybkov with at least two RDs with tanks, smash the enemy's mobile grouping in the Starodub, Novgorod-Severskii, and Trubchevsk region, together with 13th Army, and reach the Klimovichi and Belaya Dubrovka front by 15 September.

This was utterly unrealistic given the Front's inadequate forces, and Guderian's presence in their midst. At this time 3rd Army had five rifle divisions in various states of repair, one cavalry division, one tank division and a tank brigades, plus a separate tank battalion. Meanwhile, a 20km-wide gap separated his Front and Central Front's 21st Army. Yeryomenko issued his orders to Kreizer to comply with Moscow's demands, but specified that the 148th was to be filled out with replacements and remain in reserve. The offensive began on September 2, but of 3rd Army only the 108th Tank Division, 141st Tank Brigade, and 4th Cavalry Division were actively involved. The 108th was already encircled by 17th Panzer and fighting to break out; the fighting ended in a stalemate with heavy losses on both sides. While the attack was to continue the next day, it was clear that the Army was on its last legs. In his report that evening, Kreizer stated that the 148th was concentrated in a wooded area 80km northeast of Trubchevsk and was receiving three battalions of replacements. It remained there during September 4. The offensive was to be renewed on September 7 after a reorganization, by which time the division had moved back to Suzemka. 17th Panzer was moving south, being replaced by 18th Panzer Division. Yeryomenko, however, was by now convinced this effort would be futile, and that his Front would soon be fighting for its survival, although he was obliged to persist with 50th Army. In his operational summary on the evening of September 7 he stated:

148th RD - protecting the crossings [over the Desna] on the Riabchevsk and Ostraia Luka front [from 16km to 30km east-northeast of Trubchevsk] with one regiment, and 496th RR is preparing the Chymkhovo and Temnaia line [4km west of Trubchevsk].

This was a vast overstretch for a single regiment. The STAVKA persisted in ordering attacks as late as September 12. On September 16 the 2nd and 1st Panzer Groups officially linked up south of Lokhvytsia, and Southwestern Front was encircled.

== Operation Typhoon ==
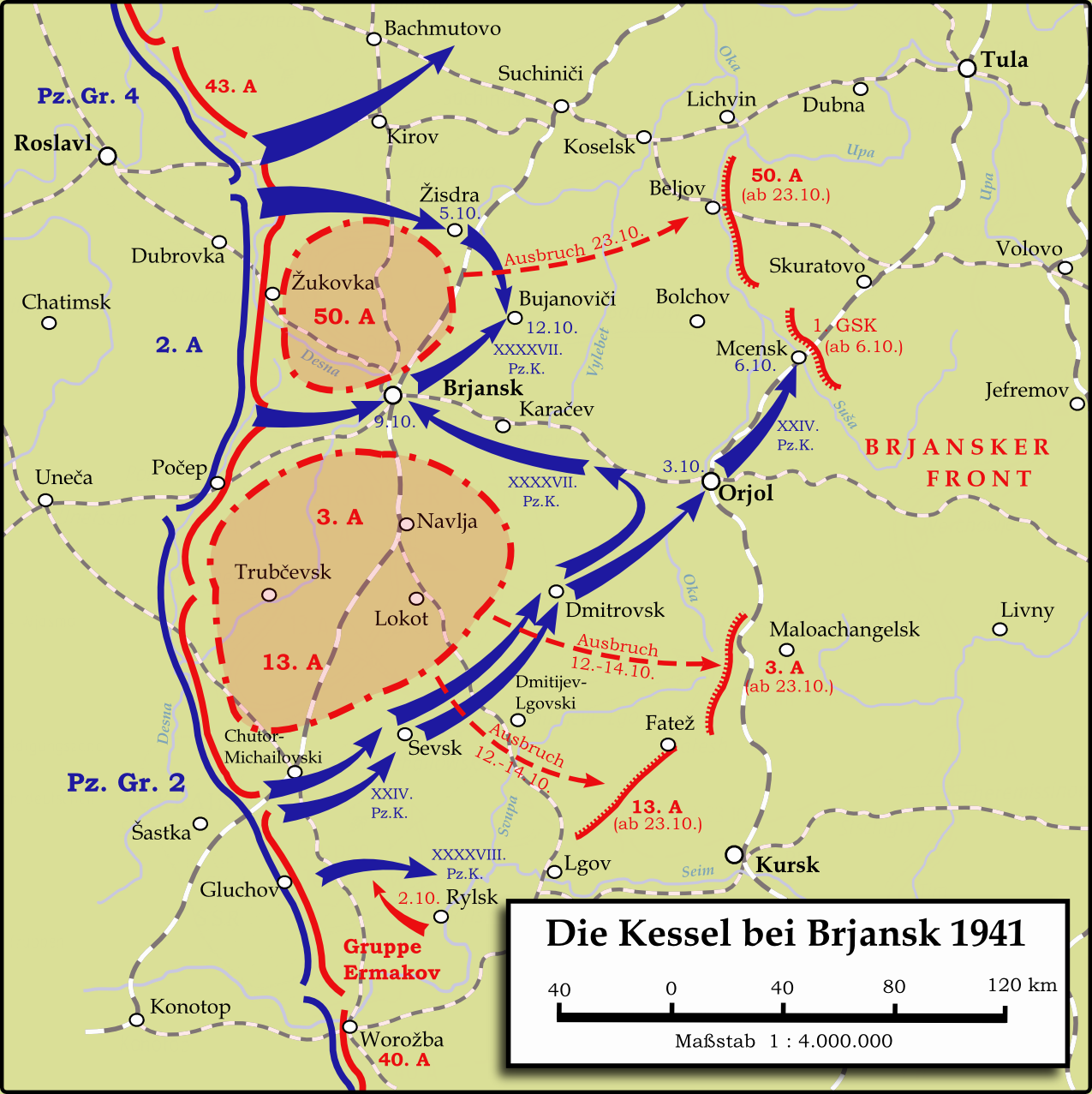
Bryansk encirclement, October 1941. Note position of 3rd Army.

Once the Kyiv pocket was eliminated it was obvious that German attentions would again be directed at Moscow. Bryansk Front's counterattacks had weakened its armies to an extent that can be seen in Kreizer's report to Yeryomenko on September 29. He stated the 3rd Army was deployed on a front of 68km with just five rifle divisions, most of which were deficient in artillery and mortars. The 137th was the only one with a reasonable strength in this arm, but could not be withdrawn to form a reserve without fatally weakening the line. The 148th had no artillery at all, and could not be regarded as a reserve for this reason, as well as its placement in echelon to secure the Army's left flank, where it linked to 13th Army.

2nd Panzer Group struck on September 30 south of 13th Army, while 2nd Army attacked toward Bryansk on October 2, cutting between 3rd and 50th Armies. The 148th was on a quiet sector, but over the next week it became encircled along with the rest of its Army. By October 12, Yeryomenko was attempting to get out with several of Kreizer's units in a night attack and eventually succeeded, but Kreizer's headquarters lost contact with the rest of his forces. Acting independently the next night, the 148th, 280th, and 282nd Rifle Divisions managed to drive a narrow corridor about 500m wide west of Navlya. Guderian acknowledged in his memoirs that some 5,000 Red Army troops fought through to Dmitrovsk-Orlovskii.

In the aftermath of this catastrophe the division was moved to the reserves of Bryansk Front by the beginning of November. Its unequipped 326th Artillery Regiment was disbanded on November 8, but reinstated on November 29. As the division continued rebuilding that month Bryansk Front was disbanded and the division returned to 13th Army, now as part of Southwestern Front. In December Bryansk Front was reinstated, and 13th Army was again assigned to it. During the winter battles this was a relatively quiet sector. Colonel Cherokmanov left the 148th on February 16, 1942, and was replaced for two days by Lt. Col. Pyotr Ivanovich Kasatkin until Col. Andrei Avksentevich Mishchenko arrived to take more permanent command. Cherokmanov had already taken over the 6th Guards Rifle Division and would be promoted to the rank of major general on May 3. He would lead the 27th Rifle Corps from June 26 well into the postwar and would be made a lieutenant general on November 2, 1944. Mishchenko had previously led the 132nd Rifle Division and would be promoted to major general on October 1, 1942.

== Voronezh–Kastornoye Offensive ==
By mid-January 1943 it was clear that a massive victory was about to be won at Stalingrad, and the STAVKA set about planning to expand this success on other fronts. By January 20 Bryansk Front, now under command of Lt. Gen. M. A. Reyter, and consisting of 3rd, 13th, and 48th Armies, plus 15th Air Army, was on a line from Bolshye Golubochki to Novosil to Gremyachaya to Kozinka. 13th Army, now with seven rifle divisions, including the rebuilt 148th, formed the Front's left wing, on a 100km-wide zone from Sidorovka to Kozinka. It had been defending along this line since the previous July, hanging over the Axis forces in the area of Voronezh–Kastornoye.

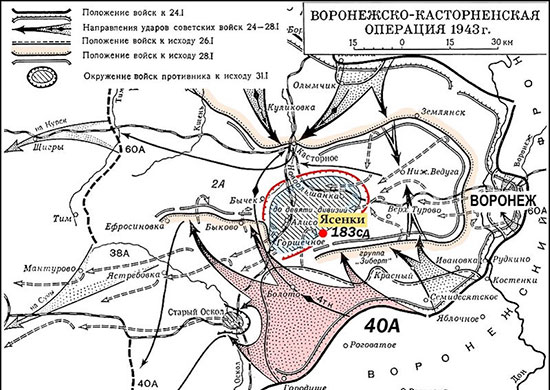
Voronezh–Kastornoye Offensive. 13th Army attacked from the north.

Bryansk Front's offensive toward Kastornoye was set for January 26. This joint operation with Voronezh Front targeted the German 2nd and Hungarian 2nd Armies. 13th Army, under command of Lt. Gen. N. P. Pukhov, was to break through along an 18km-wide sector between the Kshen and Olym rivers with a shock group of all seven rifle divisions. The 148th was in first echelon with the 307th, 132nd, and 8th Rifle Divisions. The 148th, operating on the group's right flank, was reinforced with two regiments of artillery/mortars, while the others had three each. There were three divisions in second echelon, as well as a mobile group consisting of the 129th Tank Brigade, two aerosan battalions, plus a mortar and an antitank regiment. The second echelon divisions (280th, 221st, and 81st) were, upon the arrival of the first echelon divisions in the area Volochik–Nizhne-Bolshoe–Vysshee-Bolshoe, to develop, in conjunction with the 148th, the offensive to the west and southwest to create an external encirclement front.

The offensive opened at 0808 hours with a 65-minute artillery preparation, totaling 30 minutes of fire onslaughts and 35 minutes of aimed fire, altogether to a depth of 7-8km. Air attacks began at 0855. This preparation failed to suppress the defense completely and German fire from small arms and antitank guns from strongpoints particularly affected the shock group's flanks; the 148th attacked one such at Lomigory and was stopped with heavy losses. During the opening day the main body of the first echelon broke through the German defense and advanced up to 8km in depth but was unable to develop this success. The next day the strongpoints at Lomigory and Mishino continued to hold out. General Mischenko, in spite of instructions to outflank these positions, continued frontal attacks which caused further heavy losses. Pukhov now categorically ordered him to envelop Mishino from the east. This proved successful, and overnight on January 27/28 the German forces abandoned both places and retreated to the south. The 307th and 132nd Divisions had a similar success at Zakharovka. Later in the day a pursuit took the attackers to a defense line from Volovchik to Volovo to Lipovchik. This covered the northern approaches to Kastornoye, and offered stubborn resistance. To take it, Pukhov decided to commit the 129th Tanks which, despite air attacks and deep snow, broke into Volovo, followed up by these divisions to take the entire line. Meanwhile, the second echelon had advanced to the Turchanovo–Zamaraika–Kshen line in readiness to develop the attack to the west. By now the Army had penetrated to a depth of 20km through a 25km-wide gap and routed the main forces of the German 82nd Infantry Division, creating an immediate threat to Kastornoye from the north.

On January 28, while the first echelon fought for Kastornoye the second echelon divisions began their drive from the Kshen River to the west, facing the 383rd Infantry Division. By day's end they had begun to develop the offensive toward the Tim River, followed by the 148th and 15th Rifle Divisions. At the end of the day the 13th and 38th Armies, plus elements of 40th Army, had linked up, and the main escape routes of Axis Voronezh-Kastornoye grouping had been cut, although the encirclement was not yet continuous. Also, a plan to reduce the trapped forces had not yet been adopted. 13th Army, in particular, turned to the west without engaging the pocket, instead pursuing the 383rd and what remained of the 82nd Divisions. 4th Panzer Division was moving from the Oryol area but was just beginning to arrive near Kursk. The latter was the new objective of Bryansk Front's left wing forces. For its role in this victory, on February 14 the 326th Artillery Regiment would be awarded the Order of the Red Banner.

=== Oryol Offensive ===
During February 2 General Reyter's headquarters reported on the positions of the Front's forces, including the 148th, which had its forward units at Temenskoye, Krasnyi Ugolok, and Pokrovka. At noon the next day it was said to be continuing to attack along the Sosna River after capturing Temenskoye and Kartashevka, both in the Porovka area. By the end of February 5 the division had jointly taken a line from Belozerovka to Lukovets to Legostaevo 2 with the 74th Rifle Division. Given the pace of this advance the STAVKA decided on February 6 to shift the axis toward Oryol. This would have the effect of outflanking 2nd Panzer Army on its right and getting into its rear. As part of the orders to Reyter the 13th Army was to seize Bryansk and Karachev as part of a broader effort to encircle and destroy the German grouping around Oryol. Kursk fell to forces of 60th Army on February 8.

By February 9 the advance had created a gap between 2nd and 2nd Panzer Armies in the vicinity of Fatezh, and the 148th was reported as being at Dobroe Nachalo and Malaya Plotka. Of future importance, the 81st Division captured Ponyri, Ponyri Station, and Shirokoye Boloto. However, Reyter's report noted that German resistance was stiffening. This was more apparent by February 12 as German reserves were shifted from other sectors to plug a gap which threatened their entire strategic position. In addition, Red Army logistics were not keeping pace with the advance, especially given the winter weather; it was noted that the divisional exchange points of both the 148th and 74th were "lagging 60-70 kilometres behind their forward units." The next day Reyter noted the presence of the 18th and 20th Panzer Divisions, plus two "fresh" infantry divisions and other units, to his front, which he believed were being concentrated for a counterattack to retake Kursk.

At 1000 hours on February 17 Reyter sent an update on his situation, which included:

5. The 13th Army continued its offensive toward the north during the night with it left wing units, with the mission of enveloping the Maloarkhangelsk grouping from the west...
The 148th Rifle Division, as a result of repeated counterattacks by the enemy from the Orlianka and Leski regions, withdrew to the Hill 221.9 (2 kilometres west of Kuznechik 2), Bakhmatskie Vysoty, and Hill 234.1 (1 kilometre west of Uderavka) line and was putting its forces in order along this line and preparing for an offensive beginning on the morning of 17 February 1943. The division was driving the enemy toward the north by 1000 hours and once again captured Dobroe Nachalo, Uderovo, and Peresukhaia.

Its losses for the previous day were given as 370 men killed or wounded. On February 19 forces of Army Group South had begun the offensive that would become known as the Third Battle of Kharkov and before long the forces of Voronezh and Bryansk Fronts were scrambling to hold their gains of the past weeks.

General Pukhov reported on February 23 that the 148th and 74th had jointly taken Maloarkhangelsk. The German forces withdrew northward by 10km to a stronger line along the Neruch River, which the two divisions approached on February 25. They ran into counterattacks by up to two battalions of infantry and 20 tanks, which they repelled with losses. Two days later Reyter was reporting that offensive operations by 3rd, 48th, and 13th Armies were suspended as they were "putting themselves in order and regrouping to fulfill new missions." He intended that this would be on a larger scale than previously. Pukhov formed a shock group consisting of the 148th and 74th, plus the 15th and 8th Divisions, which attacked at dawn on March 6, supported by the 118th and 129th Tank Brigades. It was to attack to the north on both sides of the Maloarkhangelsk–Oryol road. This was accompanied by similar attacks by 48th and 3rd Armies. Two days of heavy fighting followed, during which 13th and 48th Armies made no progress at all, at heavy cost, while 3rd Army did little better. A report on March 10 indicated that 13th Army had had only two days of rations on hand four days earlier, and the supply situation was still severely strained. This situation was somewhat remedied on March 11, but the 13th and 48th were confined to reconnaissance activities.

As the situation to the south deteriorated the STAVKA ordered a major regrouping of its forces. On March 12 Bryansk Front was disbanded and the 13th, 3rd, and 48th Armies were transferred to Army Gen. K. K. Rokossovskii's Central Front. German 2nd Army began a counteroffensive on March 14 against the overstretched 2nd Tank Army, while the STAVKA was removing part of Rokossovskii's forces to shore up the hard-pressed Voronezh Front. 13th Army remained stalled south of Trosna. In a flurry of orders a new Reserve Front, then a Kursk Front, and then an Oryol Front were all formed under Reyter's command, before Bryansk Front was reestablished on March 28. This command chaos brought any further Soviet offensive activity to a halt. In an after action report by Rokossovskii on March 18 General Mishchenko was singled out for criticism:

4. Weak discipline and unsatisfactory organizational work in the training and education of the rank-and-file personnel of penal companies and battalions and the flagrant violation of NKO USSR Order No. 227 regarding the employment of penal subunits. Especially intolerable was the fact of the desertion to the enemy side of 19 men from the 179th Penal Company of the 13th Army's 148th Rifle Division, who had been dispatched on reconnaissance by the commander of the division, Major General Mishchenko. The commander... grossly violated the... Order... which envisioned the employment of penal subunits for particularly difficult missions, with obligatory allocation of blocking detachments following after them, and this was not done... the penal troops displayed cowardice, a portion of them fled from the field of battle, and 19 men surrendered to the enemy. The command personnel in that company did not train its personnel satisfactorily, and, evidently, the representatives on the special department worked ineffectively, since the squad's timely preparations for treachery remained unknown to them.

Within weeks the entire front had effectively come to a standstill due to the spring rasputitsa.

== Battle of Kursk ==
Battle of Kursk. Note position of 13th Army.

On June 1 a new 15th Rifle Corps was formed under the leadership of Maj. Gen. I. I. Lyudnikov, and the 148th, 74th, and 8th Rifle Divisions were assigned to it. The STAVKA had made the decision to stand on the defense against the expected German summer offensive in the Kursk region before beginning its own offensives. The reinforced 13th Army was holding the most important sector of Central Front, about 32km wide, with 48th Army on the right and 70th Army on the left. The 148th was one of four rifle divisions in the first echelon, which was backed by a further eight divisions in the second defensive zone, the Army rear zone, and part of the first line of the Front. The 129th Tank Brigade plus five tank regiments were also in the Army rear zone, and the 4th Artillery Corps was the Army's main artillery support. Central Front's rifle divisions averaged between 5,000-6,000 personnel each, and a considerable effort was underway to comb through rear areas and hospitals for additional fit infantry.

In all, 13th Army prepared seven defensive lines, plus intermediate lines and switch positions, although the fighting would reveal the number of the latter was insufficient between the main and second defensive zone. Civilian labor was extensively used in this construction. Central Front's forces dug nearly 5,000km of trenches, laid 400,000 mines, and along the 13th and 70th Army sectors alone erected 112km of barbed wire obstacles, 10.7km of which were electrified. All villages were configured for defense. Rokossovskii considered the most likely axes of attack were Oryol–Kursk (along the railroad) and Kromy–Fatezh. 13th Army's sector was accordingly allotted nearly 100 sapper companies in its first echelon, some 40 percent of all these in the Front. Regular riflemen, gunners, and tank crews were given crash courses in mine laying and removal as a backup. The Army's first echelon had a total of 520 field guns, most of 76mm calibre, but no tanks. Each division was itself deployed in two echelons, two regiments up and one about 4km back, and the echelonment continued down to company level in some cases.

Just after midnight on July 5 a combat patrol on 13th Army's sector captured a German sapper, one Pvt. Fermello of 6th Infantry Division, who stated that the offensive was set for 0300 hours. At 0210 Rokossovskii, on the basis of this intelligence and other statements received from deserters, ordered a planned artillery counter-preparation along his Front's right wing, including 13th Army. This lasted 20 minutes and may have suppressed as many as 80 German artillery and mortar batteries and destroyed six ammunition depots. Nevertheless, the German preparation opened at 0430, directed primarily on the first echelon infantry and supporting artillery and mortars. A further counter-preparation was fired at 0435, putting some German batteries out of action until 0800. The main attack on the Maloarkhangelsk axis began at 0530 with a supporting attack eastward by 216th Infantry and 36th Motorized Divisions, with tank support, against the 148th and 8th Divisions, in an effort to drive a wedge between 13th and 48th Armies. Within about 30 minutes German troops broke into the divisions' positions on several sectors, leading to heavy fighting in the Aleksandrovka and Soglasnyi area and Maloarkhangelsk Station. General Pukhov and his staff quickly determined the routes taken by the bulk of this infantry and armor and directed concentrated artillery fire there, while releasing antitank assets and Guards mortar units in response. Under heavy fire from several directions the panzers took losses and were forced to retreat. Within a short time the 8th and 148th were able to eliminate the infantry and restore the forward edge of their defenses, preserving the boundary.

The fighting on other sectors of the Front had not gone quite as well on the first day, and Rokossovskii prepared for a counterstroke by his reserve forces on July 6. This would largely involve 17th Guards Rifle Corps and 2nd Tank Army. By 0600 the 17th Guards had thrown advance German forces out of the Ponyri area, with the 148th, 74th, and 81st Divisions also attacking for the southern outskirts of Soglasnyi and Maloarkhangelsk Station. At 1300 German 9th Army committed the 292nd Infantry Division, backed by tanks, into the battle in the Aleksandrovka area. The next day the fighting focused on Ponyri, as the German command concentrated over 170 tanks, plus motorized infantry, supported by continuous air attacks, to break through the 81st Division's defense before being halted by the 307th Division. While the original front line of 13th and 70th Armies were not restored by counterattacks, 9th Army was unable to commit its reserves to develop the offensive. As well, no further effort against Maloarkhangelsk would be undertaken as the attack front was shortened in response to heavy losses.

Overnight on July 6/7 the battered 81st was moved back to Army reserve. The day's German assault was directed at Ponyri, but the 307th held firm in the face of Tiger tanks and Panzerjäger Tigers. By the end of July 8, having suffered some 42,000 casualties in four days of fighting, 9th Army was no longer able to continue its offensive against 13th and 70th Armies. It was now time for Rokossovskii to plan his counteroffensive.

=== Operation Kutuzov ===
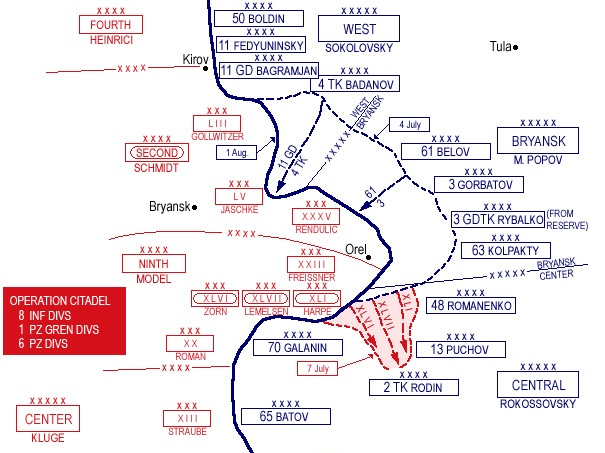
Map of Operation Kutuzov. Note position of 13th Army.

By the end of July 14 the 13th Army had deployed along its jumping-off positions. 15th Corps, which now also contained the 143rd Rifle Division, was on a line from Krasnaya Slobodka to Grinevka to Bazhenovo, still on the Army's right flank. Most of the Front's reinforcements had been concentrated in the Army's sector. Extensive reconnaissance was carried out, as well as artillery and air attacks to interfere with defensive preparations. Western and Bryansk Fronts had already begun the offensive against the Oryol salient on July 12, and German forces were already shifting northward to meet it.

Central Front attacked at 0600 on July 15 after a 15-minute artillery bombardment. Despite stubborn resistance, based in part on a large number of dug-in tanks, some damaged in the earlier fighting, by 0800 13th Army's advance elements were 2-3km into the German position and had captured Snova, Podsoborovka, and Saborovka before being halted. The next morning 2nd Tank Army entered the breach and penetrated the German formations along the Senkovo axis, which were attempting to hold 13th Army's old front line defenses. The armor began advancing north at a quick pace. By the end of July 17 the 13th and 70th Armies had completely restored their original positions while 2nd Tanks was well into the original German lines. Over the following weeks the Front advanced against a slowly retreating 9th Army until on August 1 the withdrawal to the Hagen position at the base of the salient began, which was completed on August 17. Oryol itself fell to forces of Bryansk Front on August 5.

== Into Ukraine ==
On August 26 Central Front resumed the offensive against Army Group Center, striking at the 9th Army's right flank east of Karachev and near 2nd Army's center at Sevsk and east of Klintsy. The thrust at Sevsk scored a deep penetration and the German Army Group committed what reserves it had to a counterattack against it on August 29. This left an opening for 60th Army to make a sudden advance to Yesman, 40km behind 2nd Army's south flank. Rokossovskii now regrouped 13th Army and 2nd Tank Army from his right to his left flank to exploit this success.

Over the following days 2nd Army retreated to the Desna River as Rokossovskii shifted his attention to the left (north) flank of 4th Panzer Army. On September 9 elements of Central Front crossed the Desna south of Novhorod-Siverskyi, where the 148th had fought two years earlier, and at Otsekin and between September 16 and 18 the 7th Guards Mechanized Corps aimed a two-pronged thrust northward across the Desna on either side of Chernihiv which collapsed the south flank of 2nd Army. Within days the city was liberated and the division was recognized with an honorific:

CHERNIGOV – ...148th Rifle Division (Maj. Gen. Mishchenko, Andrei Avksentevich)... The troops that participated in the liberation of Chernigov, by order of the Supreme Commander-in-Chief of 21 September 1943 and a commendation in Moscow, are given a salute of 12 artillery salvoes by 120 guns.

The Front now continued its advance toward the Dniepr in the direction of Kyiv. In October 13th Army was moved to Voronezh Front (as of October 20 1st Ukrainian Front) and the 211th Rifle Division was assigned to 15th Corps, joining the 8th and 148th. In a report dated October 10 the division was noted as having 4,616 personnel on the rolls, making it the smallest in 13th Army, armed with 52 82mm mortars, 18 120mm mortars, 10 76mm regimental guns, and the 326th Artillery had 15 76mm cannon plus nine 107mm divisional guns.

=== Battle of Kyiv ===
On October 24 the STAVKA sent directions to 1st Ukrainian Front to prepare an operation to take the Ukrainian capital. Earlier operations at Velykyi Bukryn, south of the city, had been stymied when the bridgehead was contained by German reinforcements. The Front commander, Army Gen. N. F. Vatutin, now shifted his strength, including the 3rd Guards Tank Army, to the bridgehead north of the city at Lyutizh that had been created in late September by units of 38th Army. In the planned offensive, eventually set to begin on November 3, 13th Army was to continue to hold defensively during the first stage, with all its divisions in the front line; the divisions of 15th Corps on the left wing were spread on sectors some 9km wide each.

Kyiv was taken on November 6, but during the first three days the 13th was involved in improving its positions and conducting reconnaissance, and a detachment of 8th Division which had been in the German rear since October, was operating with the partisans. In the plan the Army's forces were to advance toward Ovruch. By November 10 the reinforced 15th Corps was attempting to force the Uzh River southwest of Chornobyl, but this was unsuccessful. The next day the Army spread its attack northward. 15th Corps got across the Pripyat with part of its forces, including the 148th, and began a fight for Kopachi against stubborn resistance. During November 12 the 6th Guards and 8th Divisions established and expanded their bridgehead over the Uzh. By now the arrival of panzer reserves convinced the STAVKA to temporarily suspend the westward advance.

==== Kiev Strategic Defensive Operation ====
During the rest of November the 1st Ukrainian Front was on the defensive, under attack by the 4th Panzer Army. In response to the crisis the 15th Corps and the 148th was transferred to 60th Army, where it would remain into peacetime. By this time the strength of the 148th had bee restored somewhat, to 5,079 personnel. The Army was under command of Lt. Gen. I. D. Chernyakhovskii. 60th Army was unprepared to attack on November 25 due to ammunition shortages and difficulties in reorganization; at this time the Army's left-wing forces, including 15th Corps, was on a line from Cherniakhiv to Slipchitsy to Marianivka and was facing four infantry divisions, a security division, a cavalry regiment, and the 8th Panzer Division. Vatutin decided to postpone his counterattack to the next day, but this did not involve 15th Corps and achieved no results. He suspended offensive operations on the evening of November 28.

=== Rovno–Lutsk offensive ===
By the start of January 1944 the 148th had been shifted to the 18th Guards Rifle Corps. During the Rovno–Lutsk offensive it played an important role in the liberation of Shepetivka and in consequence on February 17 was awarded the Order of the Red Banner. The fall of this place and Rivne cut the main railroad west of Kyiv and exposed the north flank of Army Group South. It also placed the Front 175km from Lviv and 135km from Ternopil. On March 19 the division was further rewarded with the Order of Suvorov, 2nd Degree, for its role in taking the towns of Starokostiantyniv, Staryi Ostropil, and others. During the same month it returned to 15th Corps.

As the advance continued Ternopil was taken on April 14, and the 496th Rifle Regiment (Col. Sidorov, Pyotr Yakovlevich) was awarded its name as an honorific.

=== Lvov–Sandomierz Offensive ===
In the planning for a new offensive the 60th Army commander, now Col. Gen. P. A. Kurochkin, assigned his 15th and 28th Rifle Corps to the main task of driving westward to Lviv in conjunction with the 3rd Guards Tank Army, while the 23rd Rifle Corps was to attack in the general direction of Sokolovka to encircle and destroy the German forces in the Brody area. The 15th and 28th Corps were concentrated as the strike group on a 4km-wide sector and were to penetrate the German defense from the grove of trees north of Trostianets to Bzovitsa and develop the attack in the general direction Sokolivka and Lviv. The operation began with reconnaissance actions on July 13, and the shock groups went over to the attack at 1600 hours the next day; the 28th and 15th Corps fought along the line from Perepelniki to Oleiouv. On July 15, supported by heavy artillery and air strikes and repelling counterattacks by 8th Panzer and 14th SS 1st Galician Division, the strike group advanced 3-8km by day's end and 15th Corps took Kruguv, Hushche, and Na-Zasliaiiakh. By this time the Army's lead forces had wedged to a total depth of 14–16km into the German defenses and the following morning the 3rd Guards Tank was committed into the breach.

By now the German forces, recognizing their deteriorating position, were attempting to both withdraw to the west and to counterattack to restore their lines. The Army's forces advanced almost 12km on July 16 and 15th Corps reached from Khmeleva to Elekhovitse and Vilki to outside Ivanuv. During July 17 the Army's right flank and center forces gained another 6–8km. During the following day the Corps continued beating off counterattacks by up to a battalion of infantry and 10-11 tanks at a time and reached from Zhmelova through Krasne and Zolochev to the outskirts of Vilki. On July 27 the 60th Army launched a decisive attack on the city of Lviv in support of the 4th Tank Army which had followed 3rd Guards Tank into 60th Army's breach and was already fighting within the city. On the same day the 654th Rifle Regiment (Lt. Col. Fedorov, Konstantin Zakharovich) was awarded its name as a battle honor. On August 10 the 496th and 507th Rifle Regiments would receive the Order of the Red Banner, while the 326th Artillery was awarded the Order of Bogdan Khmelnitsky, 2nd Degree, for their parts in the fighting.

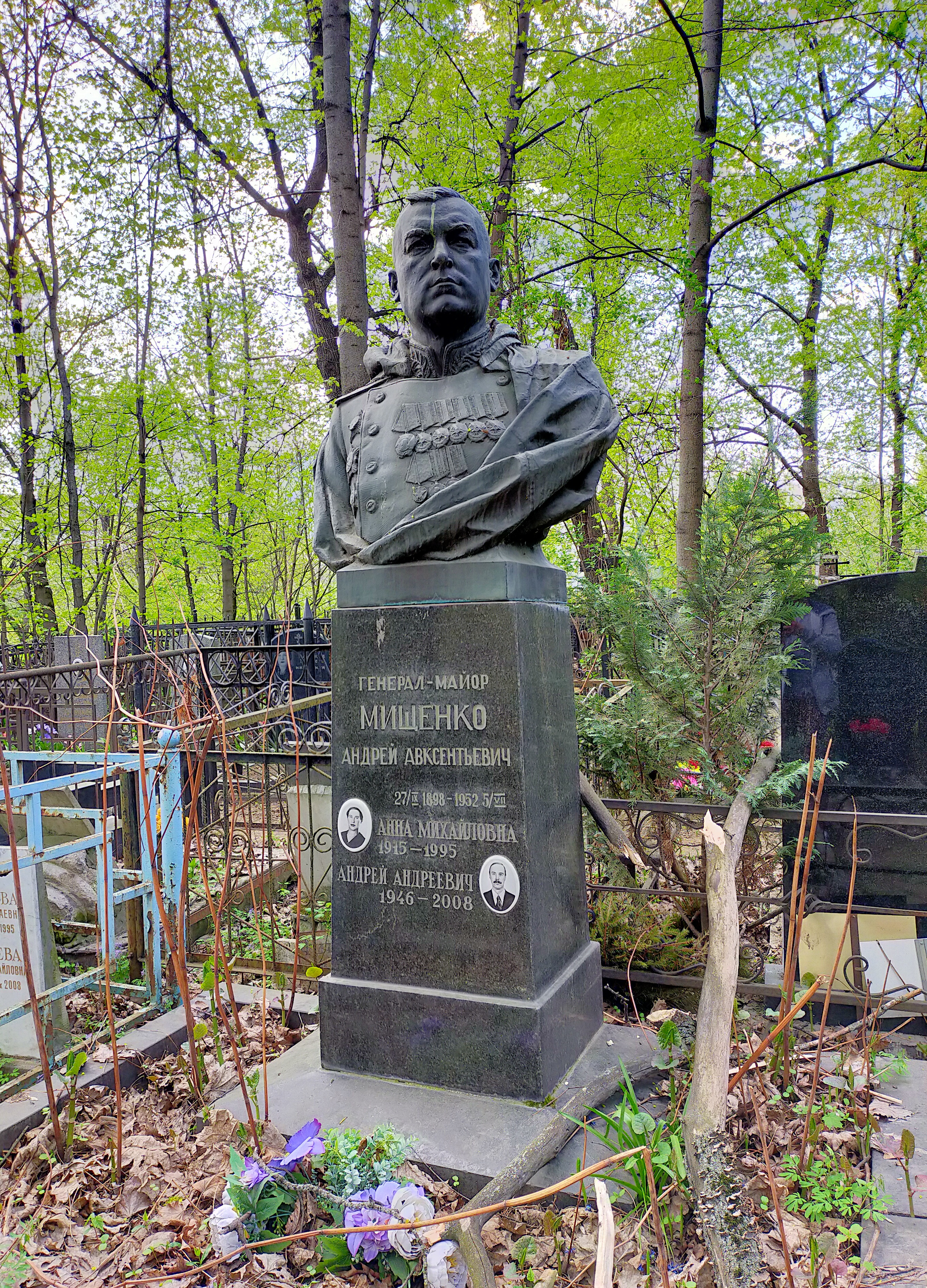
General Mischenko's grave in Vvedenskoe cemetery

Before the end of July the 148th was transferred to 106th Rifle Corps, but by the start of September had been moved again to the 28th Corps. During September it was reported that the division's personnel were roughly 65 percent Russian, or the year groups 1904-1924, while the remaining 35 percent were Ukrainian, nearly all of the year group 1924. On November 22 General Mishchenko left to study at the Voroshilov Academy; after graduating he became chief of staff of 1st Polish Army, and through the remainder of his career alternated between Soviet and Polish service, the latter at the suggestion of Marshal Rokossovskii. He died suddenly in Kraków on July 5, 1952. He was replaced as commander of the 148th by Col. Mikhail Ivanovich Goltsov. This officer would lead the division into the postwar. By the start of the new year it had returned to 106th Corps.

== Into Germany and Czechoslovakia ==
During the Vistula-Oder Offensive 60th Army began a deep exploitation to the west, through southern Poland, and on January 26, 1945, its 28th Corps drove off German rearguards on the approaches to the Auschwitz concentration camp, which was liberated the next day by the 322nd Rifle Division.

=== Lower Silesian Offensive ===
This offensive began on February 8, with the goal of capturing Breslau and advancing to the Neisse River. 60th Army occupied a 76km-wide front from Schoenblick to Goczalkowice on the Front's left wing. All three of the Army's rifle corps were deployed in the first echelon; 106th Corps had all three divisions (148th, 100th, 304th) in a single echelon as well. Both 60th and 59th Armies were in a bridgehead over the Oder River north of Ratibor, and faced significant German forces for this period of the war. As a result, the two Armies made only minor gains in the first days of the offensive and soon went over to the defense.

=== Upper Silesian Offensive ===
The Front commander, Marshal I. S. Konev, completed the Lower Silesian offensive by February 24, after which he began laying plans for a new offensive into upper Silesia. Upon the arrival of his Front's main group of forces in the Neisse area the 59th and 60th Armies were to develop the attack from the bridgehead north of Ratibor to the west and southwest. Ultimately this operation would encircle and destroy the German group of forces in the Oppeln salient. At this time the personnel strength of the Army's divisions had been reinforced to a strength of from 4,500 to 5,000 men and women. General Kurochkin planned to lead his attack with the 28th Corps on a 4km-wide front, with the 15th Corps to be introduced once a breach was made. 106th Corps was to hold along its present lines.

The offensive on the 59th and 60th Army's sector began at 0850 hours on March 15 following an 80-minute artillery preparation, and went largely according to plan although more slowly than expected. The main German defense zone was broken through on a 12km front and the Armies advanced 6–8km during the day. Bad weather prevented air support before noon, and the advancing forces also had to repel ten counterattacks. In response Konev ordered that the advance continue through the night. During the day on March 16 the 60th Army managed to advance another 4km and the following day, having repelled 13 German counterattacks, overcame the entire tactical depth of the defense in a 13km advance, seized Konigsdorf and advanced right up to Leobschutz. Konev personally visited the 60th Army headquarters on the 17th and demanded that Kurochkin reinforce the left flank of the Army's attacking troops with artillery, the 152nd Tank Brigade and independent self-propelled artillery regiments, as well as second echelon formations to develop the offensive toward Ernau and Biskau. On March 18 the Army encountered a previously prepared line from Hoenplotz to Leobschutz to Ernau and gained only 2–7km. Despite this, by the end of the day a link up with 21st Army was made in the Elgut area. The encircled Oppeln grouping consisted of the 20th SS, 168th and 344th Infantry Divisions, part of the 18th SS Panzergrenadier Division, and several independent regiments and battalions.

==== Battle for Ratibor ====
At about this time the 148th returned to 28th Rifle Corps. During March 19–20 60th Army's forces, while supporting 59th Army's efforts to destroy the Oppeln grouping, prepared to fulfill its earlier mission of defeating the German Ratibor grouping prior to reaching the line of the Opava River. For this purpose it was reinforced with the 5th Guards Mechanized Corps and the 17th Breakthrough Artillery Division. 28th Corps was to launch the main attack in conjunction with units of 5th Guards Mechanized and 31st Tank Corps to capture Leobschutz and Biskau by the end of the first day; 15th Corps committed only a single right-flank division while the remaining divisions would attack on the second day southward toward Ratibor. The Army faced four German infantry divisions, a panzergrenadier division battle group, nine independent infantry battalions and a tank battalion, for a total of 130 tanks and assault guns.

At 0850 hours on March 22, following an artillery preparation, the Army's right-flank forces began their offensive. The German forces put up stubborn resistance with fire and counterattacks by small groups of infantry and tanks. On the first day the Soviet forces advanced no more than 8km. The next day elements of the 8th and 17th Panzer Divisions were committed, considerably reducing the Soviet advantage in armor. A total of 11 counterattacks were launched, each by up to a battalion of infantry and up to 15 tanks or self-propelled guns. The intensity of these counterstrokes held part of the shock group in check into March 24. By this time the defense had been penetrated to a maximum depth of 15km and Leobschutz had been taken.

Examining the situation, Konev considered that the 60th Army was not capable of carrying out its task alone, and decided to commit the 10th Guards Tank Corps of 4th Guards Tank Army, which was no longer needed in support of 21st Army. The joint offensive began on March 25 but still failed to be decisive, in part because 10th Guards Tanks was considerably understrength, and the German forces held advantageous terrain. Stubborn fighting continued through March 31, with heavy casualties on both sides. Meanwhile, on March 24 the 38th Army of 4th Ukrainian Front began attacking in the direction of Moravian Ostrava, and within days had advanced to a point where the German Ratibor grouping was faced with encirclement. The 106th Rifle Corps entered the attack on March 26 and soon captured Rybnik. In preparation for the storming of Ratibor the Red Air Force launched massed bomber strikes amounting to about 2,000 sorties during March 29–30. In addition, the 25th Breakthrough Artillery Division was moved in to supplement the 17th Division. Early on the morning of March 31 all the artillery in the area opened fire on the German forces, which were defending the outskirts of the town. Following this preparation 60th Army began the decisive attack and by 1000 hours Ratibor was cleared. By April 1 the 60th and 4th Guards Tank Armies had reached the line Bleichwitz–Steuberwitz–Berendorf where they halted and consolidated.

== Postwar ==
In late April the entire 60th Army was transferred to 4th Ukrainian Front for the final campaign against the German forces around Prague, and the 148th returned to 106th Corps. When the shooting stopped the men and women of the division shared the full title of 148th Rifle, Chernigov, Order of the Red Banner, Order of Suvorov Division. (Russian: 148-я стрелковая Черниговская Краснознамённая ордена Суворова дивизия.) According to STAVKA Order No. 11097 of May 29, 1945, parts 5 and 8, the 60th Army was to be transferred to the Northern Group of Forces in Poland, and the 148th is listed as one of the rifle divisions to be "disbanded in place". It was disbanded in accordance with the directive in July 1945.
