= 282nd Rifle Division =

- Active: 1st formation: July–December 1941; 2nd formation: December 1941 – summer 1945
- Country: Soviet Union
- Branch: Red Army
- Type: Rifle division
- Engagements: World War II
- Battle honours: Tartu (2nd formation)

The 282nd Rifle Division (Russian: 282-я стрелковая дивизия) was an infantry division of the Soviet Union's Red Army during World War II, formed twice.

The division's first formation was formed in the summer of 1941 and destroyed in the Bryansk pocket in the fall of that year. The 282nd was quickly reformed in December 1941 in Siberia and moved west in the spring of 1942. The division fought in the Demyansk Pocket for the next year, and during Operation Bagration advanced into the Baltic states in the summer of 1944. Due to losses the 282nd spent the last months of 1944 in reserve and after receiving reinforcements reentered combat in January 1945, fighting in the Sandomierz–Silesian Offensive, the Silesian Offensives, and the Prague Offensive before being disbanded after the end of the war in the summer of 1945.

== History ==
=== First Formation ===
The 282nd began forming around 10 July 1941 at Yuryev-Polsky in the Moscow Military District. Its basic order of battle included the 872nd, 874th, and 877th Rifle Regiments, and the 826th Artillery Regiment. On 15 August, the division, only partially formed, was moved west to Starodub, where it became part of the Bryansk Front. A commander was officially assigned to the division on 20 August. By 1 September, the division became part of the 3rd Army, which it remained part of for the rest of its existence. At the end of September, Operation Typhoon, the German assault on Moscow, began. The 282nd, like many Bryansk Front units, was encircled in the Bryansk pocket. On 13 October, elements of the 282nd, fighting alongside remnants of the 148th Rifle Division and the 280th Rifle Division, opened a 500-meter gap in the German encirclement west of Navlya. Although elements of the division were able to break out, the 282nd had effectively ceased to exist as a combat unit and was officially disbanded on 27 December.

=== Second Formation ===
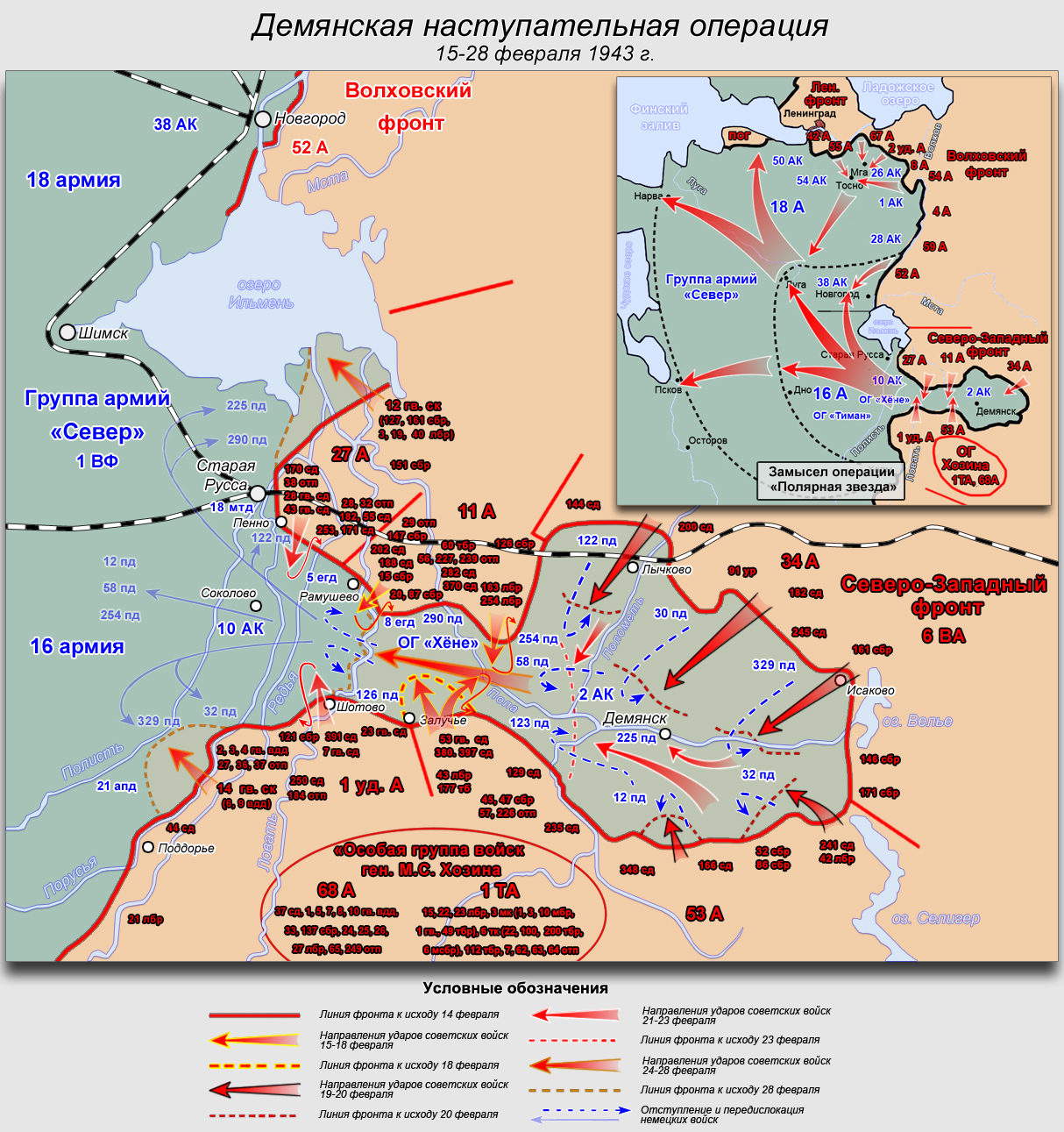
Soviet positions at Demyansk, spring 1943. The 282nd was in the 11th Army sector to the west of the German salient

The division's second formation began forming on 12 December 1941 at Omsk in the Siberian Military District, with the same basic order of battle as the previous formation. Major General Pankraty Beloborodov took command of the division. The division spent two months forming at Omsk, then was shipped west by train to Buy, where it was reinforced with workers from Leningrad on 26 February 1942. Spending another two months in the Reserve of the Supreme High Command, the division was assigned to the Northwestern Front's 11th Army, fighting in the Demyansk Pocket from late April. In February 1943 it was transferred to the 34th Army in the Staraya Russa area, and fought in the Staraya Russa Offensive. In April the 282nd was assigned to the 1st Shock Army, remaining there until the disbandment of the Northwestern Front on 20 November. The division was then transferred to the 6th Guards Army's 90th Rifle Corps, part of the 2nd Baltic Front. In January 1944, it was transferred to the 3rd Shock Army.

The division became part of the 12th Guards Rifle Corps of the 1st Shock Army before the beginning of Operation Bagration in June 1944. On 10 June, Beloborodov was transferred to command the 23rd Guards Rifle Division, and the 23rd's commander, Colonel Andrei Kartavenko, became the 282nd's commander. Between 28 June and 2 July, Colonel Ivan Echepatov led the division, and was replaced by Colonel Andrei Shiryayev on 3 July. Holding positions in the Strezhnevsky bridgehead on the Velikaya River, the division fought in the Pskov-Ostrov Offensive from 12 July, during which it advanced through the Pskov region and into Latvia and Estonia. On 9 August, it became part of the 118th Rifle Corps, which was soon transferred to the 67th Army. Fighting in the Tartu Offensive in August, the division captured the key Kärevere bridge on the Emajõgi river on 23 August after bypassing German defenses held by the 45th SS Grenadier Regiment (1st Estonian). Colonel Alexander Karavchenko took command on 31 August. The division participated in the capture of Tartu, for which it was awarded the honorific "Tartu" on 7 September. Major General Grigory Sholev became the division commander on the previous day. On 10 September the 118th Corps was transferred to the 2nd Shock Army, but on 21 September the 282nd and the rest of the corps were withdrawn to the Reserve of the Supreme High Command. During the fighting in the summer, the division had suffered such heavy losses that it was down to only 1,668 personnel. Between 24 and 25 September, the division received 2,975 replacements and began their training. On 22 October the division was loaded into trains to begin its journey from Estonia to Arkhangelsk. After arriving at Arkhangelsk by 12 November, the division moved to the Lakhtinsky camp, 12 kilometers from city, and began a six-week training period for its personnel.

Between 7 and 29 December, the 282nd moved by rail from Arkhangelsk to Rzeszów. On 2 January 1945, the division became part of the 21st Army, still in the 118th Rifle Corps. In preparation for the Sandomierz–Silesian Offensive of the Vistula–Oder Offensive, the 282nd marched 280 kilometers to the front from 13 to 23 January. The 282nd was still understrength, even after nearly three months in the reserve, and the 826th Artillery Regiment had less batteries than normal. On 11 February, Colonel Nikolai Lysenko became the division commander. During the offensive, the division captured Hindenburg, a sub-camp of Auschwitz concentration camp. On 19 February, the 874th Rifle Regiment was awarded the Order of the Red Banner for its actions in the recapture of Hindenburg. The division subsequently fought in the Lower Silesian Offensive during February and the Upper Silesian Offensive in March. On 26 April, the 874th Regiment was awarded the Order of Bogdan Khmelnitsky, 2nd class, for its actions in the capture of Neisse, and the 872nd Regiment received the Order of Alexander Nevsky for defeating German troops southwest of Oppeln.

On 6 May, the division was transferred to the 117th Rifle Corps, still part of the 21st Army, in preparation for the Prague Offensive. The 282nd launched the attack towards Schweidnitz on the next day, capturing the city and advancing into Czechoslovakia. The division captured Braunau on 9 May, and began the advance towards Prague itself, reaching Melavice, 40 kilometers from the city, a day later. At Melavice the division received orders to link up with troops of the 4th Ukrainian Front, and on 11 May it met troops of the 167th Rifle Division at Nový Bydžov.

On the next day the 282nd transferred back to the 118th Rifle Corps, and began the march from Nehavitse to Waldenburg, where it was to be begin the demobilization process with the end of the war. The division set up a camp near the city on 14 May and remained there for the next few weeks. Personnel who were not demobilized transferred to the 103rd Guards Rifle Division. In mid-June, personnel who were to be demobilized marched to Szeged by 18 July. The division was disbanded soon after with the Central Group of Forces.
