= Vasily Shakhnovich =

Soviet lieutenant general (1922-1983)

- Васіль Шахновіч
- Born: 12 January 1922; Seryagi, Byelorussian SSR
- Died: 13 August 1983 (aged 61); Moscow, Russian SFSR, Soviet Union
- Military career
- Allegiance: Soviet Union
- Service years: 1939–1983
- Rank: General Lieutenant
- Commands: 75th Motor Rifle Division, 7th Guards Army, Chief Advisor, Somalia, Chief Advisor, Angola
- Conflicts: Second World War

Vasily Vasilyevich Shakhnovich (Belarusian: Васіль Васілевіч Шахновіч, romanized: Vasil Vasilevič Šachnovič; Russian: Василий Васильевич Шахнович; 12 January 1922 – 13 August 1983) was a Lieutenant General of the Soviet Army, and a military adviser in African countries.

He was born on January 12, 1922, in the village of Seryagi, Slutsk District, Minsk Oblast, into a peasant family. In 1939 he entered the Minsk Military Infantry School named after MI Kalinin, after which in June 1941 he arrived at a military unit of the Leningrad Military District with the rank of lieutenant. During the Second World War, he participated in the defense of Leningrad and the reconquest of the Baltic states. During the war, he was promoted from platoon commander to battalion commander, and suffered five wounds.

After the war he graduated from the MV Frunze Military Academy and the M.V. KE Voroshilov General Staff Academy.

From August 1961 to November 1964 he commanded the 75th Motor Rifle Division of the 4th Army of the Transcaucasian Military District, located in Nakhichevan. He was promoted to the rank of general-major on 02.22.1963.

He was the representative of the Soviet Army in African countries. In May 1969, he was sent to the Republic of Somalia as chief military adviser and concurrently - adviser to the commander of the Somali Armed Forces, Siad Barre. For his help in Somalia, he received the title of National Hero of Somalia. In August 1971 he was recalled to his homeland, succeeded by Grigory Borisov.

From November 1971 to August 1975, he commanded the 7th Guards Army in the Armenian Soviet Socialist Republic.
