= 187th Rifle Division =

187th Rifle Division (September 13, 1939 - November 1, 1941) 187th Rifle Division (October 23, 1941 - September 1945)
- Active: 1939–1945
- Country: Soviet Union
- Branch: Red Army
- Type: Infantry
- Size: Division
- Engagements: Operation Barbarossa; Battle of Kiev (1941); Soviet invasion of Manchuria; Battle of Mutanchiang
- Decorations: Order of Suvorov (2nd formation)

Commanders
- Notable commanders: Col. Ivan Ivanovich Ivanov; Maj. Gen. Viktor Vasilevich Arkhangelskii; Maj. Gen. Iliya Mikhailovich Savin

The 187th Rifle Division was an infantry division of the Red Army, originally formed just after the start of the Second World War, based on the shtat (table of organization and equipment) of September 13, 1939. It began forming on that same date, in the Kharkov Military District, and while it was officially part of the Active Army when the invasion of Poland began four days later it was not nearly complete enough to take part. At the start of the German invasion it was in reserve in the 45th Rifle Corps, but soon began moving to the front, again joining the Active Army on July 2, 1941. It was initially assigned to 21st Army in Western Front, then moved to 13th Army in the same Front, before returning to the 21st. Part of the division was encircled and destroyed in the hard-fought battle for Mogilev. Late in August the 187th was transferred, with its Army, to Bryansk Front, just days before the 2nd Panzer Group began driving south to encircle Southwestern Front east of Kyiv. The division was directly in the path of this drive, and despite being withdrawn across the Desna River on September 5, it was pocketed by September 16 and largely destroyed within days, although not officially disbanded until November 1.

A new 187th appeared in April 1942 in the Far Eastern Front when a named rifle division was redesignated. Through most of its existence it was in 1st Red Banner Army, but just prior to the Soviet invasion of Manchuria in August 1945 it was reassigned to 5th Army. As part of 1st Far Eastern Front this Army quickly pierced the Japanese frontier defenses and the division, with its 17th Rifle Corps, was quickly shifted to 25th Army in the same Front. This was followed by an advance on Mudanjiang, which fell on August 16, two days before the Japanese capitulation. The 187th's performance was rewarded with the Order of Suvorov, but it was disbanded in September.

== 1st Formation ==
The division began forming on September 13, 1939, in Poltava Oblast in the Kharkov Military District. For its first two months it was under command of Col. Pavel Ivanovich Abramidze. As of June 22, 1941, it had the following order of battle:

- 236th Rifle Regiment
- 292nd Rifle Regiment
- 338th Rifle Regiment
- 325th Artillery Regiment
- 419th Howitzer Artillery Regiment
- 38th Antitank Battalion
- 334th Antiaircraft Battalion
- 101st Reconnaissance Battalion
- 256th Sapper Battalion
- 243rd Signal Battalion
- 158th Medical/Sanitation Battalion
- 122nd Chemical Defense (Anti-gas) Company
- 11th Motor Transport Battalion
- 98th Motorized Field Bakery
- 49th Divisional Veterinary Hospital
- 251st Field Workshop
- 403rd Field Postal Station
- 282nd Field Office of the State Bank
- 1823rd Livestock Herd

Col. Ivan Ivanovich Ivanov took command of the division on July 20, 1940. He had previously served as the deputy commanding officer of the 72nd Rifle Division.

=== Battles in Belarus ===
As of June 22 the 187th was assigned to the 45th Rifle Corps, unattached to any Army, in the Reserve of the Supreme High Command, and by July 1 it was in the same Corps, assigned to 21st Army, which was part of the STAVKA Group of Reserve Armies. On July 2, as the division joined the fighting, Marshal S. K. Timoshenko took over command of Western Front, which included the 21st. The Army, which was anchoring the Front's southern flank, launched a partially-successful reconnaissance-in-force on July 5, and then a series of resolute and somewhat effective counterattacks against the right flank of 2nd Panzer Group in the area of Rahachow and Zhlobin.

On July 7 the 45th Corps, with the 187th, was transferred to 13th Army, still in Western Front. 2nd Panzer Group renewed its assault on July 10, when two divisions of XXIV Motorized Corps crossed the Dniepr River at and near Bykhaw, 29–32km south of Mogilev. This had been partially anticipated by Timoshenko in his intelligence summary of the previous night, but he had expected the assault to be made at Rahachow. As a result, only the 187th had been left to defend the sector north of Bykhaw. After four hours of fighting the XXIV Corps had seized a sizeable bridgehead and, after driving off Soviet forces, began construction of two bridges. That evening, Timoshenko reported that 45th Corps (187th and 148th Rifle Divisions) were fighting against German units that had crossed in the Barsuki and Borkolobovo region, while at 1330 hours German tanks had been seen along the Mogilev–Novy-Bykhaw highway.

The next day, the remainder of 2nd Panzer Group also crossed the Dniepr. Timoshenko reported that 13th Army was holding at Barsuki and Borkolobovo, with the 187th fighting with German units in the bridgehead; the 137th Rifle Division had now joined 45th Corps. On July 12, Western Front headquarters stated that 13th Army's positions had been penetrated to a depth of 20km. The commander of 2nd Panzer Group, Col. Gen. H. Guderian, now directed the XXIV Corps to move eastward through Chavusy and Krychaw to Roslavl. The Corps was also supposed to protect the Group's right flank. This penetration had forced a gap between the 13th and the adjacent 20th Army, and a major portion of the former was threatened with encirclement in the Mogilev area.

=== Timoshenko's Offensive ===
In the afternoon of July 12 the STAVKA realized that desperate measures were required to restore the situation, including the need to "[c]onduct active operations along the Gomel' and Bobruisk axis to threaten the rear of the enemy's Mogilev grouping." Timoshenko and his staff had already issued a number of preliminary orders, which included directions to Col. Gen. F. I. Kuznetsov's 21st Army which demanded that a counterattack be made from the Taimonovo and Shapchitsy area by the 187th and 102nd Rifle Divisions (under command of 67th Rifle Corps) to destroy German forces in the Komarichi and Bykhaw regions. No part of Timoshenko's plan was even remotely feasible. Only 21st Army scored a partial success when it managed to project a sizeable force across the Dniepr to briefly threaten German communications with Babruysk.

The 187th went over to the attack on July 13, trying to advance north into the flank of 4th Panzer Division from Shapchitsy. The 67th Corps had been reinforced by 300 tanks of the newly-arrived 25th Mechanized Corps, but the effort turned out to be futile. The next day Timoshenko reported the partial success, without any reference to the 187th. The forces, mostly of 13th Army, that were rapidly being encircled in Mogilev were putting up very stiff resistance against 2nd Panzer Group and included part of the division.

== Battle of Kyiv ==
By July 16, the 45th Corps had managed to escape southward to rejoin 21st Army. In a report on July 21 it was stated that the 236th Rifle Regiment was in the Rogi region as part of this Army, but there was no information about its remaining regiments. By July 23 the division had lost over half of its artillery, leaving it with just 10 76mm regimental guns, 12 76mm cannons, 24 122mm and six 152mm howitzers, plus six 120mm mortars. Through the following days, until Mogilev fell on July 27, the 21st Army launched incessant attacks from the south in an effort to assist the defense. The commander of the defending 61st Rifle Corps, Maj. Gen. F. A. Bakunin, ordered a breakout by his remaining troop overnight on July 26/27, but only a handful managed to reach Soviet lines. Shortly after rejoining 21st Army the 187th was reassigned to 21st Rifle Corps.

While Mogilev was presenting one difficulty to Army Group Center, the continuing resistance of 21st Army was another thorn in its side. Elements of the 21st had earlier recaptured Rahachow, forcing German 2nd Army to prepare to take it back. The new commander of the 21st (which was now part of Central Front), Lt. Gen. M. G. Yefremov, requested permission to withdraw his 63rd Rifle Corps back to more defensible positions on the east bank of the Dniepr, but was refused.

On August 14 the 187th was again reassigned, now to 28th Rifle Corps, still in 21st Army. When 2nd Panzer Group turned south into the flank and rear of Southwestern Front, the division was directly in its path. General Kuznetsov had returned to command of the Army on August 25, and at noon two days later he sent a combat report to the commander of Bryansk Front, Lt. Gen. A. I. Yeryomenko, describing the alarming progress of the German drive. 21st Army was described as being involved in sustained fighting since 1000 hours, and the 187th was said to be at Klintsy and Glinishche, 108–114 km west of Trubchevsk. Kuznetsov formed two shock groups, largely of cavalry, in a bid to restore his communications with 13th Army.

Despite these efforts, by August 29 Kuznetsov's force had been separated from the rest of his Front by the XXIV Motorized Corps. 28th Corps, now consisting of the 187th and 117th Rifle and 219th Motorized Divisions, was defending along a line from Gutka Studenetskaya through Elino to Novye Borovichi; together with 66th Rifle Corps it was attempting to hold a 100 km-wide line with a handful of battered rifle divisions. Despite this, over the following days the STAVKA continued to issue attack orders to the Front which were doomed to failure.

=== Encirclement and Disbandment ===
By August 30 the 2nd Panzer Group had begun its drive to the south to link up with 1st Panzer Group and encircle Southwestern Front east of Kiev. 28th Corps was defending along the Snov River on and appears to have eliminated a German force that had infiltrated its positions on September 1 but this was of little relevance to the overall situation. The next day the 187th was reported as fighting intense defensive battles along a line from Gutka Studenetskaya to Mostki, 78–95 km northeast of Chernihiv. During September 4 the 187th was defending from Tikhonovichi to the wood 2 km southeast of Slobodka. Kuznetsov ordered his Army to withdraw across the Desna River at 1300 hours on September 5.

The two panzer groups met at Lokhvytsia on September 16. Most of 21st Army was pocketed, including the 187th, and it was destroyed by the end of the month although it officially remained in the Red Army order of battle until November 1.

Colonel Ivanov suffered a heavy wound on September 15 and was evacuated from the pocket. After returning to duty in January 1942 he took command of the 8th Rifle Division, and on October 1 was promoted to the rank of major general. In June 1943 he was moved to command the 18th Rifle Corps of 65th Army, and after leading his Corps in a crossing of the Dniepr near Gomel he was made a Hero of the Soviet Union. He later led the 124th Rifle Corps before the end of the war in 3rd Belorussian Front. However, he came under some suspicion and was arrested in December 1951, and on October 2, 1952, he was sentenced to 10 years imprisonment, with his rank and his title as a Hero of the Soviet Union revoked. After the death of Stalin in March 1953 he was rehabilitated in August and restored to his rights and rank. He served in the educational establishment until his retirement in April 1955, and died in Moscow on July 8, 1968.

== 2nd Formation ==
The Grodelkovskaya Rifle Division began forming on October 23, 1941, in the 1st Red Banner Army of Far Eastern Front, north of Vladivostok. In April 1942 it was redesignated as the 2nd formation of the 187th. Following redesignation its order of battle was almost completely different from the 1st formation:

- 92nd Rifle Regiment
- 208th Rifle Regiment
- 316th Rifle Regiment
- 1139th Artillery Regiment (later 325th)
- 458th Self-Propelled Artillery Battalion (in 1945)
- 64th Antitank Battalion
- 56th Reconnaissance Company
- 113th Sapper Battalion
- 97th Signal Battalion (later 137th Signal Company)
- 105th Medical/Sanitation Battalion
- 48th Chemical Defense (Anti-gas) Company
- 179th Motor Transport Company
- 151st Field Bakery
- 964th Divisional Veterinary Hospital
- 1935th Field Postal Station (later 1884th)
- 453rd Field Office of the State Bank

The division came under command of Col. Viktor Vasilevich Arkhangelskii on the day it began forming. This officer would be promoted to the rank of major general on February 22, 1944, but on June 13 he left the division and soon took command of the 4th Fortified Region. He was replaced by Col. Iliya Mikhailovich Savin, who had led the 385th Rifle Division in 1941-42, and more recently the 17th Rifle Brigade. He would command the 187th into the postwar, being promoted to major general on April 20, 1945. The division immediately came under command of 26th Rifle Corps, but in May it came under direct Army command.

=== Soviet invasion of Manchuria ===
Manchurian Operation. Note initial position of 5th Army (V GE) on right.

In February 1943 the 187th joined 5th Rifle Corps, still in 1st Army, but in July it again came under Army control. It remained in this arrangement throughout 1944. During the early months of 1945 the division received the 458th Self-Propelled Artillery Battalion of 12 SU-76s (plus one T-70 command tank) to supplement its mobile firepower in anticipation of operations in the difficult terrain of Manchuria.

During July the division was assigned to the 17th Rifle Corps of 5th Army in the Primorsky Group of Forces, which would soon be renamed 1st Far Eastern Front. When the invasion began on August 9 the division attacked Japanese border fortifications, with support from the 20th Assault Engineer Brigade, and in two days ripped through the forts and advanced over 22 km into Japanese-held territory, From August 10 the 17th Corps was assigned to 25th Army.

At Heitosai the Soviet advance divided into two separate columns. 17th Corps, with the 72nd Mechanized Brigade acting as a forward detachment, drove west toward the Taipingling Pass. While the 187th launched a frontal attack, the other division of the Corps, the 366th Rifle, encircled positions of the Japanese 284th Infantry Regiment of the 128th Division at Lotzokou from the south on August 15. Late on the next day both divisions, in cooperation with a brigade of the 10th Mechanized Corps, pushed the Japanese forces out of Lotzokou and the Taipingling Pass. Mudanjiang was taken after a two-day battle on August 15–16. On August 18 the Japanese capitulation was announced, by which time the 187th was near the Korean border.

== Postwar ==
On September 19 the 187th was awarded the Order of Suvorov, 2nd Degree, in recognition of its part in the crossing of the Ussuri River and the capture of Mishan, Jilin, Yanji and Harbin. Before the end of the month it had been disbanded.
