= 280th Rifle Division =

- Active: 1st formation: July–October 1941; 2nd formation: December 1941–1947
- Country: Soviet Union
- Branch: Red Army
- Type: Rifle division
- Engagements: World War II
- Decorations: 2nd formation: Order of the Red Banner; Order of Suvorov 2nd class
- Battle honours: Konotop (2nd formation); Korosten (2nd formation)

Commanders
- Notable commanders: Dmitry Golosov

The 280th Rifle Division (Russian: 280-я стрелковая дивизия) was an infantry division of the Soviet Union's Red Army during World War II, formed twice. It was first formed in the summer of 1941 and destroyed in the Bryansk pocket in the fall of 1941. The division was reformed in late December, and served throughout the war before being disbanded in 1947.

== History ==
=== First formation ===
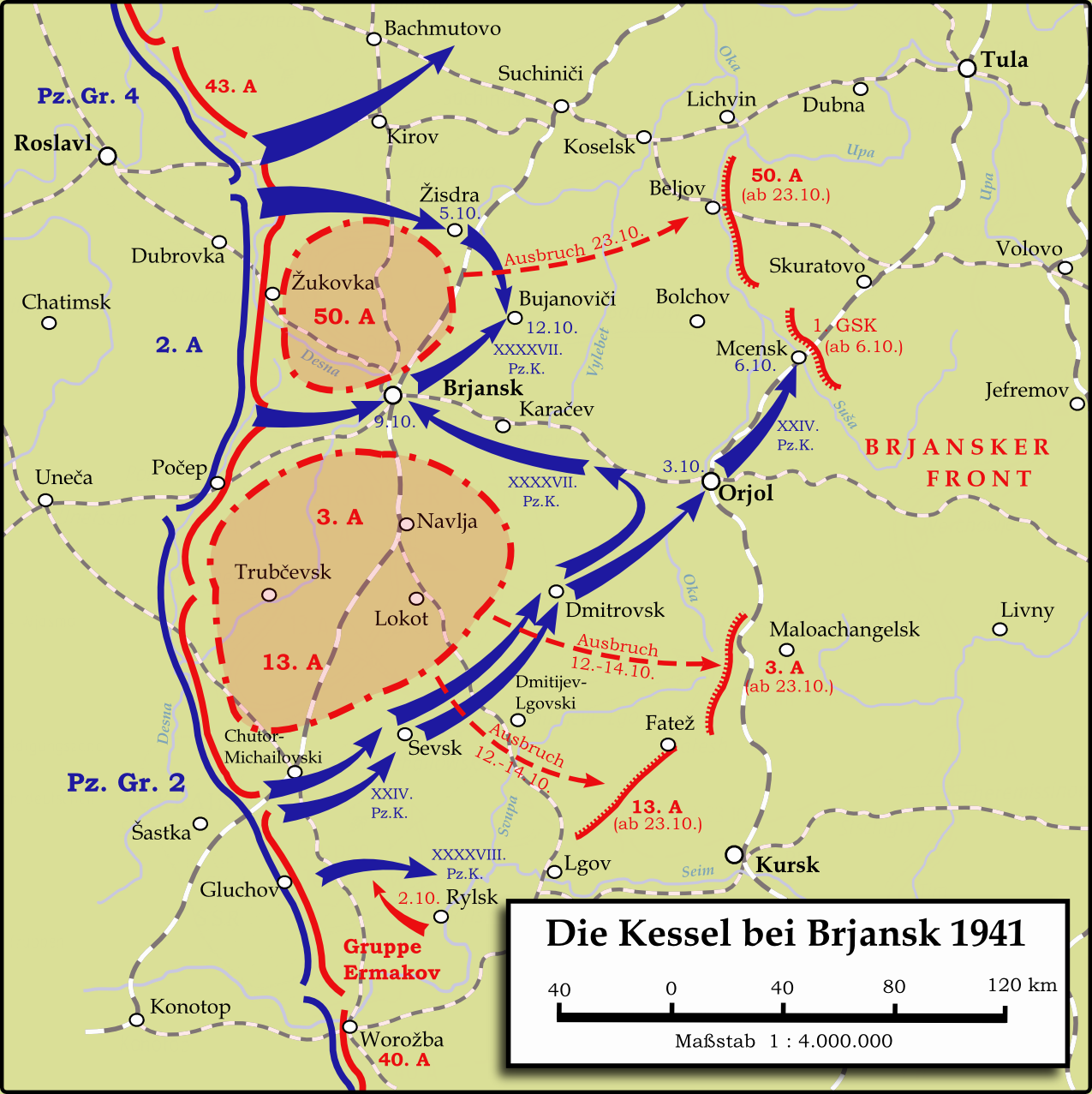
The 280th Rifle Division was part of the 50th Army, shown encircled to the north of Bryansk.

The 280th began forming on 2 July 1941 near Tula in the Moscow Military District. Its basic order of battle included the 1031st, 1033rd, and 1035th Rifle Regiments, as well as the 840th Artillery Regiment and 583rd Sapper Battalion. After spending a month forming near Moscow, the division was assigned to the 24th Army of the Reserve Front on 5 August. Its headquarters was located at Slobodka, southeast of Smolensk. The division was transferred to the newly formed 50th Army of the Bryansk Front on 15 August. At the end of September, the division was trapped in the Bryansk pocket at the beginning of Operation Typhoon, the German assault on Moscow. Its headquarters was overrun and its commander, Sergei Danilov, captured. On 13 October elements of the 280th, fighting alongside remnants of the 148th Rifle Division and the 282nd Rifle Division, opened a 500-meter gap in the German encirclement west of Navlya. A handful of men escaped, but the bulk of the division was destroyed in the pocket and it was officially disbanded on 18 October.

=== Second formation ===
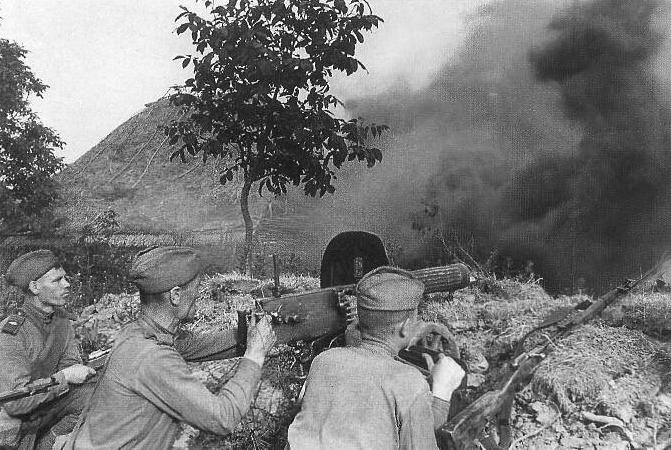
A Soviet machine gun crew during the Battle of Kursk.

The second formation of the 280th began on 25 December near Stalingrad in the North Caucasus Military District. It used the same basic order of battle as the first formation, but added the 368th Anti-Tank Battalion. The division remained near Stalingrad until its March 1942 transfer to the Reserve of the Supreme High Command. In April the incomplete 280th Rifle Division transferred to the Bryansk Front reserve and the next month was assigned to the 48th Army. During June and July, the division received reinforcements from the Moscow Military District's 14th Reserve Rifle Brigade. In January 1943, the 280th was moved to the 13th Army, which was transferred to the Central Front in March. By 1 April it had become part of the 28th Rifle Corps, and later that month the division with its corps was moved to the 70th Army. The 280th fought in the Battle of Kursk in July to the north west of Kursk. It was transferred to the 60th Army's 77th Rifle Corps during the battle. On 15 September 1943, it was awarded the Order of the Red Banner for its "exemplary fulfillment of command tasks...and valor and courage".

In October, the army was transferred to the 1st Ukrainian Front, with which the 280th spent the rest of the war. As part of the 18th Guards Rifle Corps, the division transferred to the 1st Guards Army in March 1944. On 27 July the division returned to the 13th Army, with which it remained for the rest of the war. Initially assigned to the army's 47th Rifle Corps, the 280th transferred to the 24th Rifle Corps in September. By December it had become part of the 27th Rifle Corps. During the last weeks of the war the division moved back to the 24th Rifle Corps. By the end of the war, the division's honorifics were "Konotop-Korosten, Order of the Red Banner, Order of Suvorov." The division was relocated to Liuboml in the Carpathian Military District with the 24th Rifle Corps, where it was disbanded in 1947.
