= 7th Guards Army =

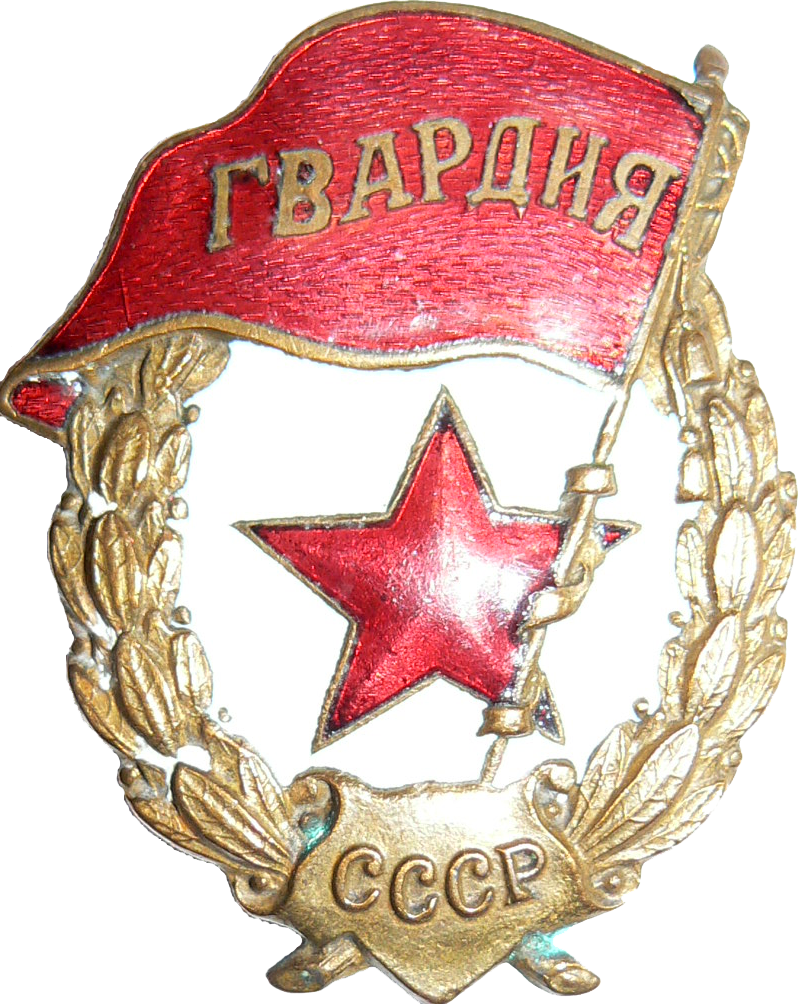
- Active: 1943–1991
- Country: Soviet Union
- Branch: Soviet Ground Forces
- Type: Army
- Garrison/HQ: Yerevan (April 1946 – August 1992)
- Engagements: World War II: Battle of Kursk; Belgorod-Kharkov Offensive Operation; Uman–Botosani Offensive; Second Jassy–Kishinev Offensive; Battle of Debrecen; Budapest Offensive; Bratislava-Brno Offensive; Prague Offensive

Commanders
- Notable commanders: Mikhail Shumilov; Yakov Kreizer; Ivan Fedyuninsky; Filipp Cherokmanov; David Dragunsky

The 7th Guards Army was a field army of the Red Army during World War II and of the Soviet Army during the Cold War.

== History ==
The 7th Guards Army was formed from the 64th Army on April 16, 1943.

64th Army had originally been formed from 1st Reserve Army in July 1942, and alongside the 62nd Army, fought the German offensive during the Battle of Stalingrad to a standstill, for which it was raised to Guards status. General Lieutenant M.S. Shumilov, who had commanded the 64th Army, continued to command 7th Guards Army through the rest of the war, though he was promoted to General Colonel in October 1943.

It included the 15th, 36th, 72nd, 73rd, 78th and 81st Guards Rifle Divisions, which were incorporated in the 24th and 25th Guards Rifle Corps. As part of the Voronezh Front and the Steppe Front since July 18, 1943, the Army participated in the Battle of Kursk and the Battle for the Dnieper River from July through August, 1943. Subsequently, as part of the 2nd Ukrainian Front, it participated in the Kirovograd Offensive, and those of Uman–Botoșani, Jassy–Kishinev, Debrecen, Budapest, Bratislava and Brno, and Prague.

The 7th Guards Army was stationed in Austria as part of the Central Group of Forces briefly after the war. On 1 May 1945 it comprised 23rd Rifle Corps (19th and 252nd Rifle Divisions), 25th Guards Rifle Corps (4th and 6th Guards Airborne Divisions, 25th Guards Rifle Division, 303rd Rifle Division, and 27th Guards Rifle Corps (72nd Guards, 141st, 375th, and 409th Rifle Divisions. In 1946 it comprised three rifle corps totaling nine divisions, and that year General Ivan Fedyuninsky took command for a period. These formations were reassigned to the North Caucasus, Tavria and Kiev Military Districts and the Army HQ arrived at Yerevan in the Transcaucasus Military District to take control of the 75th and 261st Rifle Divisions, soon followed by the 26th Mechanised Division and the 164th Rifle Division. Postwar, in January 1946, the 72nd Anti-Aircraft Artillery Division was relocated to the Transcaucasus, where it became part of the 7th Guards Army in the cities of Yerevan and Leninakan.

In the late 1980s the Army consisted of:

- 15th Motor Rifle Division (MRD)(former 15th Rifle Division) – Kirovakan
- 75th Motor Rifle Division (former 75th Rifle Division) – Nakhichevan, Category "C" with 5–10% manning
- 127th Motor Rifle Division (former 261st Rifle Division) – Leninakan, Armenia
- 164th Motor Rifle Division (former 164th Rifle Division) – Yerevan

In November 1988 Colonel Lev Rokhlin became the commander of the 75th MRD. In early 1990 the division was transferred to the Soviet Border Troops of the KGB, and Rokhlin was promoted to major-general in February of the same year. Later the division was transferred to the Azerbaijani Army, but to the representatives of the Nakhichivan government rather than authorities from the Azerbaijani Ministry of Defence.

The army was disbanded on August 14, 1992 in accordance with Directive of the General Staff of the Russian Federation No. 314/03/0772. Some units were transferred to Armenia. Russia received the entire 127th Motor Rifle Division and some other smaller units.

Lieutenant General Fyodor Reut was the Army's last commander, from May 1991 to August 1992. Most of the formations disbanded/dissolved, among them the 15th MRD, whose equipment were partly handed over to Armenia when it disbanded in 1992. The 15th MRD's traditions, honors and awards were transferred to the 5209th Weapons and Equipment Storage Base. The 127th MRD later became the Russian 102nd Military Base.

== Commanders ==
- Mikhail Shumilov (April 1943 – February 1946)
- Yakov Kreizer (April 1946 – April 1948)
- Ivan Fedyuninsky (April 1948 – November 1951)
- Filipp Cherokmanov (November 1951 – July 1955)
- Ivan Pavlovsky (July 1955 – April 1958)
- Sergey Maryakhin (May 1958 – May 1960)
- David Dragunsky (May 1960 – June 1965)
- Anatoly Gribkov (June 1965 – December 1968)
- Alexey Klyuyev (December 1968 – November 1971)
- Vasily Shakhnovich (November 1971 – August 1975)
- Stanislav Postnikov (September 1975 – June 1977)
- Konstantin Kochetov (June 1977 – 1979)
- Bronislav Omelichev (1979 – May 1982)
- Yury Shatalin (May 1982 – August 1984)
- Mikhail Kolesnikov (August 1984 – February 1987)
- Nikolay Pishchev (1989 – 1990)
- Yevgeny Meshcheryakov (1990 – May 1991)
- Fyodor Reut (May 1991 – August 1992)

== Notes ==
- Feskov, V.I.; Golikov, V.I.; Kalashnikov, K.A.; Slugin, S.A. (2013). Вооруженные силы СССР после Второй Мировой войны: от Красной Армии к Советской [The Armed Forces of the USSR after World War II: From the Red Army to the Soviet: Part 1 Land Forces] (in Russian). Tomsk: Scientific and Technical Literature Publishing. ISBN 9785895035306.
