= Fyodor Reut =

Fyodor Mikhailovich Reut
- Фёдор Михайлович Реут
- Born: 9 December 1946; Nikolskoye, Zvenigorod okrug, Moscow Oblast, USSR
- Died: 25 October 2011 (aged 64); Moscow, Russia
- Military career
- Branch: Soviet Army; Russian Ground Forces
- Service years: 1968–1999
- Rank: Colonel general
- Commands: 13th Guards Army Corps; 7th Guards Army; Group of Russian Forces in the Transcaucasus
- Awards: Order "For Personal Courage"; Order of Military Merit

Fyodor Mikhailovich Reut (9 December 1946 – 25 October 2011) was a Soviet and later Russian military officer. Reut reached the rank of Colonel general and commanded the Group of Russian Forces in the Transcaucasus.

In 1968 he graduated from the Ulyanovsk Tank College, then in 1978 from the Malinovsky Armoured Forces Academy, and in 1990 the General Staff Academy of the Soviet Armed Forces.

- 1968-1978 - The commander of a tank platoon in the Leningrad Military District, a tank company and a tank battalion in the Transbaikal Military District.
- 1978-1990 - The commander of a Guards Tank Regiment in the Southern Group of Forces, deputy commander of the Infantry Division, deputy commander and commander of the Guards Tank Division in the Kiev Military District.
- 1990 - Commander of the 13th Guards Army Corps (Moscow Military District).
- 1990-1992 - First Deputy Commander of the 22nd Army.
- 1992 - Commander of the 7th Guards Army in the Armenian SSR. On Monday, June 1, 1992, ITAR-TASS reported that Reut said that some units of the 7th Guards Army would begin leaving Armenia in 10–15 days.
- August 1992 – 1999 - Commander of the Group of Russian Forces in the Transcaucasus.

In 1998 it was reported that he was under investigation for corruption.

He retired in 1999, and died on 25 October 2011 in Moscow.
