= Filipp Cherokmanov =

Soviet Army lieutenant general

Filipp Mikhailovich Cherokmanov
- Native name: Филипп Михайлович Черокманов
- Born: 16 November 1899; Marovka village, Penza Governorate
- Died: 8 June 1978 (aged 78) Voronezh, Soviet Union
- Allegiance: Soviet Union
- Branch: Soviet Army
- Service years: 1919–1957
- Rank: Lieutenant general
- Commands: 148th Rifle Division; 6th Guards Rifle Division; 27th Rifle Corps; 29th Guards Rifle Corps; 3rd Army; 7th Guards Army
- Conflicts: Russian Civil War; World War II; Battle of Smolensk; Battle of Moscow; Battle of the Dnieper; Lvov-Sandomierz Offensive; Vistula-Oder Offensive; Berlin Offensive
- Awards: Hero of the Soviet Union; Order of Lenin (2); Order of the Red Banner (3); Order of Suvorov, 1st class; Order of Suvorov, 2nd class (2); Order of Kutuzov, 2nd class; Order of the Red Star; Czechoslovak War Cross; Cross of Valour

Filipp Mikhailovich Cherokmanov (Russian: Филипп Михайлович Черокманов; 16 November 1899 – 8 June 1978) was a Soviet Army lieutenant general and Hero of the Soviet Union. Cherokmanov joined the Red Army during the Russian Civil War. During the interwar period, Cherokmanov became an officer and commanded the 148th Rifle Division from 1939. He led the division through the Battle of Smolensk and the Battle of Moscow. In February 1942 he became commander of the 6th Guards Rifle Division and was promoted to major general. During the summer of 1943, he became the commander of the 27th Rifle Corps. Cherokmanov was awarded the title Hero of the Soviet Union for his leadership during the Battle of the Dnieper. He led the corps through the rest of the war, including in the Berlin Offensive. Postwar, Cherokmanov commanded the 29th Guards Rifle Corps, 3rd Army and 7th Guards Army. After becoming deputy commander of the Turkestan Military District, Cherokmanov retired in 1957.

== Early life and Russian Civil War ==
Cherokmanov was born on 18 November 1899 in the village of Marovka in what is now the Issinsky District of Penza Oblast to a peasant family. He worked as a laborer. Cherokmanov became a shepherd working for the Rozhnovsky landowning family in the village of Solovtsova.

In May 1919, he was drafted into the Red Army and served in the Volsky Separate Battalion. In 1920, he graduated from the regimental school of the 22nd Rifle Regiment of the Volga Military District. In April, he became the assistant chief of the Penza Food Requisition Detachment. From January 1921, he was a platoon commander in the 1st Penza Rifle Regiment of the 1st Rifle Division. He fought in the suppression of the Tambov Rebellion.

== Interwar ==
In 1922, Cherokmanov graduated from the 112th Infantry and Command Training Course of the Volga Military District. He served as a squad leader and platoon leader in the 1st Rifle Regiment of the 1st Rifle Division. In October 1924, he was transferred to the 3rd Rifle Regiment and became a company and then a battalion commander. Cherokmanov joined the Communist Party of the Soviet Union in 1926. In October 1933, he became a battalion commander in the 183rd Rifle Regiment of the 61st Rifle Division. He then became the chief of the division's junior commander school. Cherokmanov then was assistant chief of the 1st department of divisional staff. In 1936, he graduated from the Vystrel Commander's Courses. He became the 183rd Rifle Regiment's chief of staff. In April 1937, he became the assistant chief of the 2nd department of Volga Military District staff. Cherokmanov became the head of the district military council's monitoring group.

In February 1938, Cherokmanov became the commander of the 157th Rifle Regiment of the 53rd Rifle Division. He studied at the Refresher Courses for Commanders (KUKSA) at the Military Academy of the General Staff from November 1938 to May 1939. In October, he became commander of the 148th Rifle Division.

== World War II ==
On 22 June 1941, Germany attacked the Soviet Union in Operation Barbarossa. Cherokmanov led the 148th Rifle Division as part of the 21st Army at the end of June. On 1 July, the division was transferred to the 13th Army. The division fought in the Battle of Smolensk. In July, the division was fighting on the Oster near Shumyachi. The division suffered such heavy losses fighting German tanks that officers fought in the trenches. The division then retreated into the forest, where Cherokmanov attempted to capture a group of German soldiers. He was wounded but was able to crawl into a thicket. At night, he reached the Krasny Krym collective farm, where he was sheltered by an elderly farmer, Nikolai Filippovich Kozlov. For a month, Kozlov sheltered Cherokmanov. After recovering from his wounds in August, Cherokmanov crossed the front line.

On 16 September, Cherokmanov again became commander of the 148th Rifle Division. The division fought in the Battle of Moscow. During the Yelets Offensive, the division captured Yelets on 9 December. On 25 December, it captured Livny. On 10 February 1942, Cherokmanov was transferred to command the 6th Guards Rifle Division. He was awarded the Order of the Red Banner on 18 February. On 3 May, he was promoted to Major General. In May 1943, the division was transferred to Ponyri, at the northern end of the Kursk bulge. Just before the beginning of Operation Zitadelle on 5 July, Cherokmanov was promoted to command the 27th Rifle Corps on 27 June. Cherokmanov commanded the corps during its defense of the Ponyri area. He then led the corps during the Chernigov-Pripyat Offensive. During the offensive, the corps crossed the Desna River, Snov River and Sozh River with minimal losses. On 16 September, he was awarded the Order of Suvorov 2nd class. The corps reached and quickly crossed the Dnieper between 15 and 16 October in the area of Loyew. On 30 October, Cherokmanov was awarded the title Hero of the Soviet Union and the Order of Lenin for his leadership during the offensive.

Cherokmanov then led the corps during the Proskurov-Chernivtsi Offensive in March 1944. The division captured Berestechko on 2 April and Radekhiv during the offensive. In July and August, the corps fought in the Lvov–Sandomierz Offensive. It captured Jarosław and helped gain and hold the Sandomierz bridgehead during the offensive. He was awarded the Order of Suvorov 2nd class a second time on 25 August. On 3 November, he was awarded his second Order of the Red Banner. In January 1945, the corps helped launch the Vistula–Oder Offensive from the bridgehead. On 21 February, he was awarded his second Order of Lenin. He was awarded the Order of Kutuzov 2nd class on 6 April. The corps then fought in the Berlin Offensive and ended the war on the Elbe. Cherokmanov was awarded the Order of Suvorov 1st class on 29 May for his leadership during the offensive.

== Postwar ==
Cherokmanov continued to command the 27th Rifle Corps until March 1947. In March 1948, he graduated from higher academic courses at the Military Academy of the General Staff. He then became commander of the 29th Guards Rifle Corps. On 15 November 1950, he was awarded a third Order of the Red Banner. In February 1951, Cherokmanov became commander of the 3rd Shock Army. In November, he became commander of the 7th Guards Army in the Transcaucasian Military District. In July 1955, Cherokmanov became deputy commander of the Transcaucasian Military District. He retired in August 1957 and lived in Voronezh. In 1972, he became an honorary citizen of Yelets. He died on 8 June 1978 and was buried at the city's Kominternovskoye Cemetery.
