= 72nd Anti-Aircraft Artillery Division =

- Active: October 1943–c. 1950s
- Country: Soviet Union
- Branch: Red Army (later Soviet Army)
- Type: Anti-Aircraft Artillery

The 72nd Anti-Aircraft Artillery Division (Russian: 72-я зенитная артиллерийская дивизия) was an anti-aircraft artillery division of the Soviet Union's Red Army (later the Soviet Army) during World War II and the early postwar period.

Formed in late 1943 in the Moscow Military District, the division provided air defense for Yaroslavl and then Crimea, without seeing combat. Postwar, it was transferred to Armenia and was disbanded by the end of the 1950s.

== World War II ==
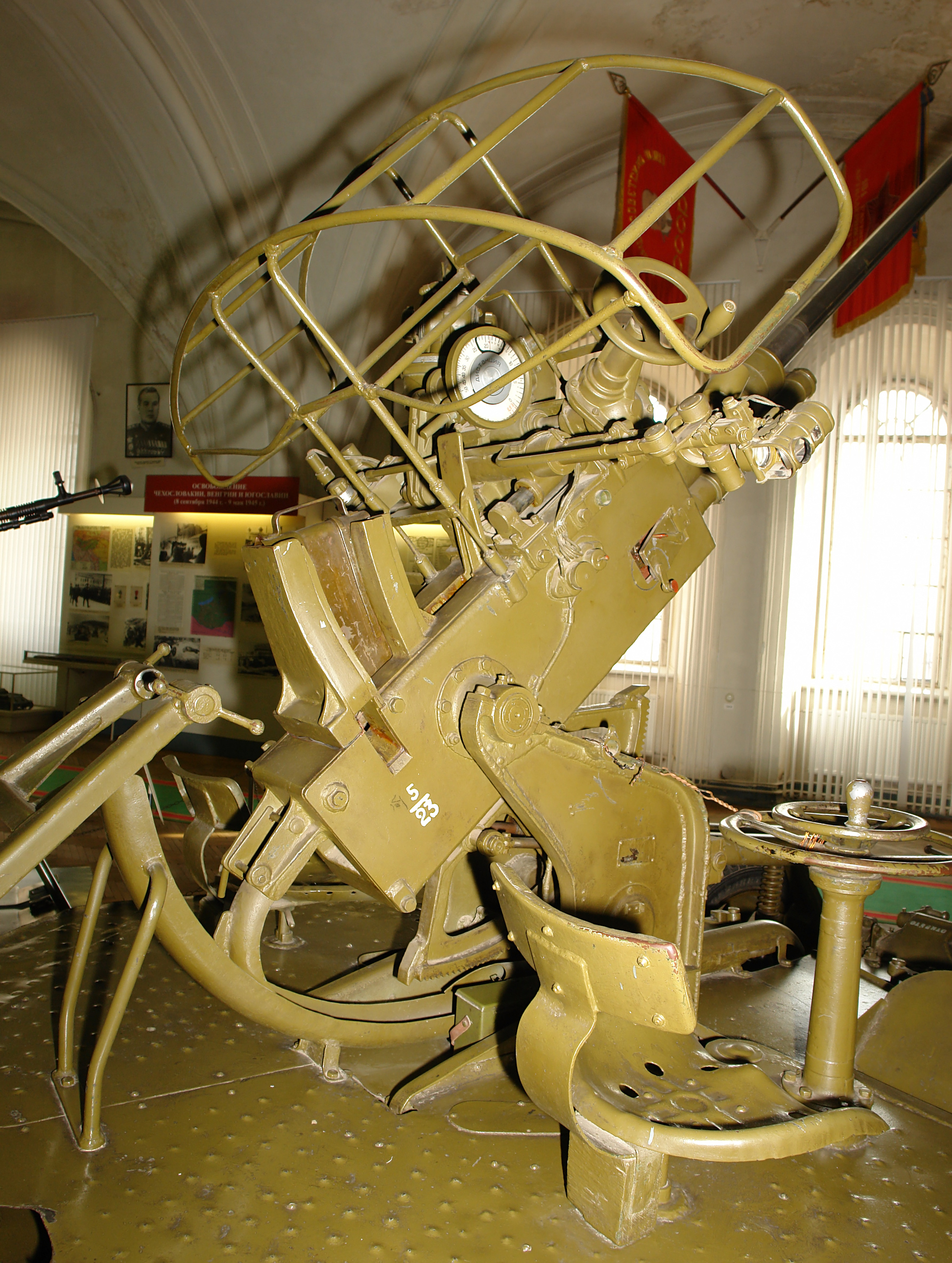
A 37 mm AA gun of the type used by the division during World War II

The division began forming at the Moscow Anti-Aircraft Artillery Training Camp around 15 October 1943, when Lieutenant Colonel Abram Danilov was appointed temporary commander. It was part of the Moscow Military District, and included the 79th, 82nd, 250th, and 309th Anti-Aircraft Artillery Regiments. On 26 October Colonel Andrey Krasavin took command of the division, and Danilov became the deputy commander.

From 2 May 1944, Colonel Vladimir German served as division commander. During the month, the 79th, 82nd, and 250th Regiments were transferred to the 6th Air Defense Corps. They were replaced by the 253rd, 582nd, and 870th Regiments. The division did not see combat and provided air defense for Yaroslavl. From January 1945, the 72nd was part of a special group of air defense troops covering the Yalta Conference. After the end of the conference, the division provided air defense for the Separate Coastal Army until the end of the war, as part of the Reserve of the Supreme High Command.

== Postwar ==
Postwar, in January 1946, the division was relocated to the Transcaucasia, where it became part of the 7th Guards Army in the cities of Yerevan and Leninakan. German continued to command the division until December 1947, when he was sent to study at the Dzerzhinsky Artillery Academy. The division was among those anti-aircraft artillery divisions disbanded without being converted into another unit by the end of the 1950s.
