= 72nd Guards Joint Training Centre =

Belarusian Armed Forces unit

6th Guards Rifle Division (1941–1945) 15th Guards Mechanized Division (1945–1957) 47th Guards Tank Division (1957–1960) 47th Guards Tank Training Division (1960–1965) 45th Guards Tank Training Division (1965–1987) 72nd Guards District Training Centre (1987–1991) 72nd Guards Joint Training Centre (1991–present)
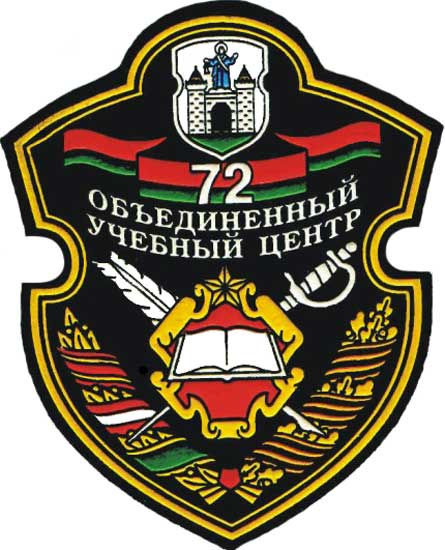
- Active: 1941–present
- Country: Soviet Union (to 1991); Belarus (1992–present)
- Type: Infantry, Tank (former); Training unit (current)
- Garrison/HQ: Borisov
- Engagements: World War II: Battle of Moscow; Battle of Kursk; Lvov-Sandomierz Offensive; Berlin Offensive
- Decorations: Order of Lenin; Order of the Red Banner; Order of Suvorov
- Battle honours: Rivne

Commanders
- Current commander: Colonel Vadim Surov
- Notable commanders: Dmitry Onuprienko

The 72nd Guards Joint Training Centre is a training centre of the Belarus Armed Forces. It trains warrant officers and junior specialists for the Belarus Armed Forces and is based in Borisov. The 72nd Guards Joint Training Centre traces its history back to the Soviet 120th Rifle Division. For its actions during the Yelnya Offensive, the division became the 6th Guards Rifle Division in September 1941. In November 1945, the division became the 15th Guards Mechanized Division. On 15 May 1957, it became the 47th Guards Tank Division. The division became a training unit in 1960 and was renamed the 45th Guards Tank Training Division in 1965. In 1987, it became the 72nd Guards District Training Centre. In 1992, it was taken over by Belarus and became the 72nd Guards Joint Training Centre.

== World War II ==
On 26 September 1941, the 120th Rifle Division (First Formation), under the command of Major General Konstantin Ivanovich Petrov, became the 6th Guards Rifle Division for its actions in the Yelnya Offensive.

Due to the German breakthrough in the Sevsk area on 2 October, the 1st Guards Special Rifle Corps was formed. It consisted of the 6th Guards Rifle Division as well as the 5th Guards Rifle Division and two tank brigades. The corps was assembled around Mtsensk and the 6th Guards Rifle Division arrived at the railway station there on 6 October. After the German capture of Oryol, the corps was ordered to mount a counterattack to stop the German advance. The division, along with other units of the corps, fought actions around Mtsensk that delayed the German advance for two weeks.

In November, the division became part of the 3rd Army. It was positioned around Yefremov, which was captured by German troops on 22 November. The division fought in counterattacks to reclaim the city over the following weeks. The division finally pushed the German troops out of the city on 12 December. Continuing to advance, the division captured Novosil on 27 December. Starting on 8 January 1942, the division fought in the Bolkhov-Mtsensk Offensive, attempting to break through German defences on the Oka River in the Krivtsovo-Chegodaeva-Gorodische area. The division was unable to advance and suffered heavy losses. On 13 February, division commander Major General Petrov was mortally wounded by machine-gun fire from a German aircraft. The offensive was called off on 18 March.

Three days later, the division became part of the Bryansk Front reserve. From May for a year onwards, the division fought in local battles within the Oryol Oblast as part of the 48th Army. In May 1943, the division became part of Central Front's 13th Army and was transferred to Ponyri, where it took up defensive positions. Ponyri was located at the northern end of the Kursk bulge and the division occupied the second line, behind the 15th Rifle Division. German troops began the first attack of the Battle of Kursk on 5 July, breaking through the 15th Rifle Division's positions while suffering heavy losses. By the end of the day, the 6th Guards Rifle Division was defending the Ponyri railroad station, against German armored units. The division continued to defend the station against repeated German assaults for the next five days. On 7 July, the German 9th Panzer Division captured part of the forest of Berezovy Log from the division but took half the day to capture the rest of Ponyri from the neighboring 307th Rifle Division. However, the 307th and 6th Guards Rifle Divisions counterattacked after a costly German attack on 9 July and recaptured Ponyri. Due to their losses, the German troops were forced to end their offensive on the next day. According to Soviet accounts, the division had killed or wounded 8,800 German troops, destroyed 254 tanks and self-propelled guns, including 23 Tiger and Panther tanks. They also reportedly shot down five German planes. For its actions at Kursk, the division was awarded the Order of the Red Banner.

The division continued to fight in combat and participated in Operation Kutuzov, in which it led the attack on Dmitrovsk. In late August, the division fought in the Chernigov-Pripyat Offensive (part of the Chernigov-Poltava Offensive). After breaking through German defences, the division advanced toward Glukhov and Rylsk. During the offensive, the division captured parts of Sumy and Chernigov Oblasts, including Shostka. The division was introduced into the breach in the German lines created by the 60th Army's advance. It advanced in the direction of Bakhmach and Nizhyn. After crossing the Seym River on 8 September, the division advanced to cross the Desna River north of Oster on 20 September. By the next day it was on the Dnieper near Chernobyl. Since German troops were prepared for an attempt to cross the Dnieper there, division commander Major General Dmitry Onuprienko decided to march the division northwards and cross the river there at night. The division crossed the Dnieper near Teremtsy village without meeting resistance. Continuing to advance, the division crossed the Pripyat River before dawn and created a bridgehead in the area of Opachychi. There, the division faced strong German resistance but was able to hold the positions until the rest of the 17th Guards Rifle Corps could cross by 29 September, allowing the corps to capture Pripyat. For his actions during the offensive, division commander Major General Dmitry Onuprienko was awarded the title Hero of the Soviet Union. Until the capture of Kiev on 6 November, the division fought to capture the Pripyat area. It was then transferred to the Korosten area but was unable to capture Korosten. The division then fought in the Kiev offensive operation in early November and the Kiev Defensive Operation for the rest of November and most of December. From 24 December to 14 January 1944, the division fought in the Zhitomir–Berdichev Offensive.

The division captured Rivne during the Rivne-Lutsk Offensive on 2 February in conjunction with the 8th Guards Cavalry Division and 112th Rifle Division, receiving the title "Rivne" for its actions. The division then advanced towards Dubno but was unable to capture it and briefly went on the defensive. During March and April, the division fought in the Proskurov-Chernivtsi Offensive, during which it captured Berestechko. Beginning on 13 July, the division fought in the Lvov–Sandomierz Offensive, during which it crossed the Bug, San and Vistula rivers. On 9 August, the division was awarded the Order of Suvorov 2nd class for crossing the Vistula.After the end of the offensive in late August, the division fought to hold the Sandomierz bridgehead. In January 1945, the Soviet troops renewed the attack in the Sandomierz-Silesian Offensive. On 26 January, the division seized a bridgehead over the Oder and held it against German counterattacks for three days. From 8 February, they fought in the Lower Silesian Offensive. Continuing to advance, the division fought in the Berlin Offensive. It captured Zahna on 22 April. After the 1st Ukrainian Front was transferred from Berlin, the division fought in the Prague Offensive. The division ended the war in or around Prague. On 28 May, it was awarded the Order of Lenin for crossing the Oder.

== Cold War ==
On 11 November 1945, the division was converted into the 15th Guards Mechanized Division. On 27 May 1946, it moved as part of the 3rd Guards Rifle Corps to the Belarusian Military District. The division was relocated to Borisov as part of the 41st Rifle Corps on 26 April 1947. On 20 May 1948, it became part of the 7th Tank Army. On 15 May 1957, the division became the 47th Guards Tank Division. It became a tank training division on 2 August 1960. On 11 January 1965, it became the 45th Guards Tank Training Division. Viktor Chechevatov commanded the division from 1982. On 30 November 1987, it became the 72nd Guards District Training Center.

== Belarus ==
Taken over by Belarus with the dissolution of the Soviet Union, it became the 72nd Guards Joint Training Center for junior specialists on 30 November 1992. In 2001, the training center changed its name to reflect that it now also trained warrant officers and adopted its current structure. As part of the reform of the Armed Forces in 2005, a transition was made to a centralized system for training junior specialists in a new organizational structure.

== Commanders ==
The division was commanded by the following officers:

- Major General Konstantin Ivanovich Petrov (26 September 1941 – 31 January 1942; died of wounds)
- Colonel (promoted to Major General 3 May 1942) Filipp Cherokmanov (10 February 1942 – 27 June 1943)
- Major General Dmitry Onuprienko (28 June 1943 –16 August 1944)
- Lieutenant Colonel Matevos Muradyan (17 August – 2 September 1944)
- Major General Georgy Vasilyevich Ivanov (3 September 1944 – 9 May 1945)
- Major General Sergei Potapenko (2004-2006)
- Colonel Igor Korol (2015-2016)
- Colonel Vadim Surov (2022-present)

== Composition ==
The 6th Guards Rifle Division was composed of the following units during World War II.

- 4th Guards Rifle Regiment
- 10th Guards Rifle Regiment
- 25th Guards Rifle Regiment
- 34th Guards Artillery Regiment
- 11th Guards Separate Antitank Battalion
- 2nd Guards Intelligence Company
- 5th Guards Sapper Battalion
- 3rd Guards Separate Communications Company (reduced in size to company)
- 126th (later 7th) Medical and Sanitary Battalion
- 9th Guards Separate Chemical Defence Company
- 229th (later 12th) Trucking Company
- 99th (later 16th) Field Bakery
- 424th (later 8th) Divisional Veterinary Hospital
- 84th Field Post Office
- 81st Field Ticket Office of the State Bank

The 45th Guards Tank Training Division was composed of the following units in 1970.

- 11th Training Tank Regiment
- 178th Training Tank Regiment
- 114th Guards Training Tank Regiment
- 307th Guards Training Motorised Rifle Regiment
- 622nd Guards Training Artillery Regiment
- 600th Training Anti-Aircraft Artillery Regiment
- Separate Training Missile Battalion
- Separate Training Reconnaissance Battalion
- 207th Separate Guards Training Engineer-Sapper Battalion
- 3rd Separate Guards Training Communications Battalion
- Separate Training Chemical Defence Company
- 198th Separate Training Equipment Maintenance and Recovery Battalion
- 126th Separate Training Medical-Sanitary Battalion
- 26th Separate Training Motor Transport Battalion

Today, the joint training centre contains multiple schools responsible for training, as well as two separate battalions.

- 114th Guards Czestochowa Orders of Kutuzov and Bogdan Khmelnitsky Red Star School for warrant officers and food service specialists – trains maintenance personnel, food service personnel and communications personnel (former 114th Guards Motorized Rifle Training Regiment)
- 3rd Guards Minsk-Gdansk-Vislenskaya Red Banner Orders of Lenin, Suvorov 2nd and 3rd class and Order of Kutuzov School training tank and artillery specialists – trains tank and artillery personnel (former 3rd Guards Tank Regiment)
- 59th Zhytomyr Red Banner School of training in operation of motor vehicles and repair units – trains drivers for the trucks and technicians
- 12th School training specialists for communication units – trains communications specialists
- 320th Motorized Infantry School training intelligence, engineering and Chemical Corps specialists – trains snipers, reconnaissance, airfield support drivers, maintenance vehicle drivers and chemical specialists (former 320th Military School of Engineering Troops)
- 307th Guards Orders of Kutuzov and Bogdan Khmelnitsky School training specialists for motorized and mobile units – trains BMP-2 commanders, gunners and drivers, as well as mobile unit commanders (former 307th Guards Motorized Rifle Regiment)
- Logistics Center – responsible for repair, maintenance and operation of equipment and weapons
- 495th Separate Material Supply Battalion – responsible for supply of material resources
- 197th Separate Security & Maintenance Battalion – provides security for the training centre
