= Kanev uezd =

Subdivision of Kiev Governorate of the Russian Empire

Kanev uezd Каневский уезд
- Uezd
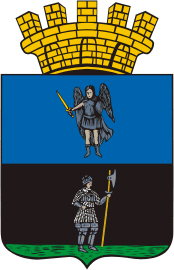
- Coat of arms

- Location in the Kiev Governorate
- Country: Russian Empire
- Krai: Southwestern
- Governorate: Kiev
- Established: 1796
- Abolished: 1923
- Capital: Kanev

Area
  - Total: 3,259.75 km^{2} (1,258.60 sq mi)

Population (1897)
  - Total: 268,860
  - Density: 82.479/km^{2} (213.62/sq mi)

The Kanev uezd (Russian: Каневский уезд; Ukrainian: Канівський повіт, romanized: Kanivs'kyi povit) was one of the subdivisions of the Kiev Governorate of the Russian Empire. It was situated in the eastern part of the governorate. Its administrative centre was Kanev (Kaniv).

== Demographics ==
At the time of the Russian Empire Census of 1897, Kanevsky Uyezd had a population of 268,860. Of these, 88.7% spoke Ukrainian, 9.7% Yiddish, 1.0% Russian and 0.5% Polish as their native language.
