= 143rd Rifle Division =

143rd Rifle Division (September 10, 1939 – June 1946)
- Active: 1939–1946
- Country: Soviet Union
- Branch: Red Army (1939-46)
- Type: Infantry
- Size: Division
- Engagements: Soviet annexation of Western Belorussia; Occupation of Lithuania; Operation Barbarossa; Battle of Białystok–Minsk; Battle of Smolensk (1941); Battle of Moscow; Yelets Operation; Case Blue; Operation Gallop; Battle of Kursk; Operation Kutuzov; Battle of the Dnieper; Battle of Kiev (1943); Zhitomir–Berdichev offensive Operation Bagration; Lublin–Brest offensive Vistula–Oder offensive East Pomeranian offensive Battle of Berlin
- Decorations: Order of the Red Banner; Order of Suvorov
- Battle honours: Konotop; Korosten

Commanders
- Notable commanders: Maj. Gen. Dmitrii Potapovich Safonov; Maj. Gen. Georgii Alekseevich Kurnosov; Col. Aleksandr Alekseevich Startsev; Col. Dmitrii Ivanovich Lukin; Maj. Gen. Mitrofan Moiseevich Zaikin

The 143rd Rifle Division was formed as an infantry division of the Red Army in early September 1939 in the Byelorussian Military District, based on the shtat (table of organization and equipment) of September 13. It took part in the invasion of eastern Poland later that month, and the occupation of Lithuania in 1940. At the time of the German invasion on June 22, 1941, it was in 47th Rifle Corps, a reserve corps of Western Special Military District. In the initial chaos it moved west and quickly collided with advancing German forces, becoming encircled in the Minsk pocket, but emerging with enough strength to be subordinated to 4th Army. Shortly before that Army was disbanded the division was transferred to 13th Army, soon part of Central Front, and barely escaped being encircled again in early August, falling back to, and then beyond the Desna River. When Bryansk Front was established 13th Army was subordinated to it. Through September it was involved in fighting along the Desna which further weakened it, and it was then encircled with its Army in Operation Typhoon, forcing it to break out with catastrophic losses. During November the division was forced back past Livny in the last gasps of the German offensive, but joined the counteroffensive in early December, helping to retake that town as well as Yelets before making modest gains to the southwest during January 1942. It remained in the same area throughout the year, recovering its strength as the German summer offensive moved south and east of its positions. Following the victory at Stalingrad, now as part of 48th Army, still in Bryansk Front, it pushed through the weak German 2nd Panzer Army toward Kursk. This advance was halted in March 1943 and the 143rd remained in positions near Pokrovskoye during the buildup to the fighting for the Kursk salient, being transferred to the recreated Central Front. The division did not see much fighting during the German offensive but joined the following counteroffensive into the Oryol salient, and at the end of July was pulled back to the Reserve of the Supreme High Command for rest and rebuilding. When it returned to the front in late August it was assigned to 60th Army, and very soon won a battle honor for its part in retaking Konotop, after which it advanced to the Dniepr River. During October, now as part of 1st Ukrainian Front, it attempted to enlarge the existing bridgeheads north of Kyiv with little success, but made much greater progress when the offensive was renewed in early November. As it pushed west of the city it took part in the capture of Korosten; this was lost to German counterattacks later in the month, but retaken in late December, giving the 143rd its second battle honor. It was further distinguished with the Order of the Red Banner as a result of the advance on Lutsk in February 1944. Following this it took up positions south of the Pripet Marshes as part of 47th Army. During the second stage of Operation Bagration in July, as part of the 1st Belorussian Front, it helped break the German defense around Kovel, earning the Order of Suvorov. From there it advanced with its Army toward Warsaw and several of its subunits won awards in the fighting for Praga. When the winter offensive began in January 1945 the 47th outflanked the German units still holding in the city, then headed east toward Pomerania, before regrouping for the final offensive on Berlin. Along with its Army it helped encircle the city from the north, linking up with 1st Ukrainian Front near Potsdam, and then marched west, meeting US Army forces along the Elbe River. Postwar, it was part of the Group of Soviet Forces in Germany, and was disbanded there in June 1946.

== Formation ==
The division was formed on the basis of the 98th "Samara" Rifle Regiment of 33rd Rifle Division at Gomel in the Byelorussian Military District during September 6–11, 1939. Given this experienced cadre it was able to take part in the invasion of eastern Poland later that month. Kombrig Dmitrii Potapovich Safonov was given command of the 143rd on May 9, 1940, and would have his rank modernized to that of major general on June 5. As an artillery officer he had previously led the artillery of 24th Rifle Corps. Under his command the 143rd would participate in the occupation of Lithuania beginning on June 15. At the start of the German invasion the division was deployed in positions southwest of Baranavichy. It was in the 47th Rifle Corps of the Western Special Military District (soon redesignated Western Front), which also contained the 55th and 121st Rifle Divisions. Its order of battle was as follows:

- 487th Rifle Regiment
- 635th Rifle Regiment
- 800th Rifle Regiment
- 334th Artillery Regiment
- 186th Antitank Battalion
- 135th Reconnaissance Company
- 209th Sapper Battalion
- 165th Signal Battalion (later 24th Signal Company)
- 206th Medical/Sanitation Battalion
- 203rd Chemical Defense (Anti-gas) Company
- 34th Motor Transport Company (later 154th)
- 340th Field Bakery
- 229th Divisional Veterinary Hospital
- 794th Field Postal Station
- 298th Field Office of the State Bank

The division which, as part of the "6000 class", had under that number of personnel, was supposed to be brought up to full strength with men and vehicles from the Volga Military District, according to the mobilization plan. In the event, little of this actually arrived before the division was swept up into the fighting; the 487th Regiment also failed to arrive near Baranavichy and was forced to serve under other commands, eventually forming part of the garrison of Mogilev under 172nd Rifle Division.

=== Minsk Pocket ===
Maj. Gen. S. I. Povetkin, whose 47th Corps was headquartered at Babruysk, quickly began moving his remaining divisions and other elements toward Baranavichy and Slonim, where they met advancing German forces. Heavy fighting developed around the latter place in which the understrength 143rd suffered heavy casualties, soon being encircled in the Minsk pocket with the remnants of 3rd, 4th, and 10th Armies. While attempting to lead his men out of the encirclement on June 26 General Safonov was killed in action near Baranavichy, and his place of burial remains unknown. By June 30 about one-third of the original strength of the division had managed to escape, and it, plus the rest of 47th Corps, now with the 155th Rifle Division in place of the 121st, was officially subordinated to 4th Army.

In the uncertainty around Safonov's fate, he was not officially replaced until July 16, when Col. Georgii Alekseevich Kurnosov was brought in from his position as chief of the Combat Training Section of 13th Army. This officer had been in command of a rifle regiment in September 1937 when he was removed from this post; in June 1938 he was dismissed from the Red Army and then arrested as part of the Great Purge. He was released and reinstated in February 1940 and had then mostly served as an instructor and inspector.

By the start of July the leaderless and partly disarmed 143rd was positioned along a line from Degtianov to Yalovka to Kruglitsa in eastern Belarus. Around dusk on July 3 Western Front reported to the STAVKA that while remnants of 4th and 13th Armies had managed to cross the Dniepr River, few from 3rd and 10th Armies had done so. 4th Army units included the Army headquarters and those of 28th and 47th Corps, 14th Mechanized Corps, and six rifle divisions including the 143rd, 55th, 155th, and 121st. The Front commander, Marshal S. K. Timoshenko, ordered 21st Army to consolidate a defense along the river and send out advance detachments to stop or delay the advance of 2nd Panzer Group, which proved surprisingly effective. By July 10 the 143rd had been resubordinated to 4th Army's 28th Rifle Corps.

=== Battle of Smolensk ===
The commander of 2nd Panzer, Gen. H. Guderian, was searching for a crossing point over the Dniepr, and believed he had found two, on either side of Mogilev. At this time the 28th Corps was recuperating along the Sozh River south of Krychaw with the rest of 4th Army, now under command of Maj. Gen. L. M. Sandalov. On July 10 2nd Panzer and 3rd Panzer Groups began twin thrusts over the Dniepr, with Smolensk as the intermediate objective. By the end of the next day Guderian's XXXXVII Motorized Corps was across at Kopys, XXXXVI Motorized at Shklov, and XXIV Motorized at Bykhaw. The Sozh was the next obstacle in his path as XXIV Corps advanced on Krychaw.

The operational summary of Western Front issued at 2000 hours on July 13 made clear that Timoshenko was losing control of the situation as the German advance continued. 13th Army was threatened with encirclement near Mogilev. Despite this, the STAVKA ordered counterattacks, including, "Conduct active operations along the Gomel and Bobruisk axis to threaten the rear of the enemy's Mogilev grouping." This effort would largely involve 21st Army, but 13th and 4th Armies were to clear the German bridgeheads east of the Dniepr, which was in no way feasible. The 13th was withdrawing to the Sozh with panzers deep in its rear areas. Late in the day Timoshenko reported that 28th Corps was continuing to "fill out and reorganize" its divisions, now along the Pronia River in the area of Chavusy and Propoisk. On July 14 Sandalov was directed to "destroy the enemy mechanized grouping penetrating toward Gorki by attacking from the Riasna, Shirki, and Osinovka region" with the 143rd, 42nd, and 55th Divisions, in cooperation with 13th Army. Over the next two days Timoshenko dialed back on such overoptimistic goals. On July 15 the 29th Motorized Division entered Smolensk.

The 3rd Panzer Division of XXIV Motorized captured Chavusy on July 15, while 4th Panzer Division took Propoisk. However, until 2nd Army arrived from the west 2nd Panzer Group would be forced to besiege the now-encircled Mogilev for the next few days. At 2000 hours on July 16 Timoshenko reported that as of that morning the 143rd was occupying a line from Zareche to Berezovka, from 45 km east-southeast to 62 km southeast of Mogilev. Shortly after, Sandalov pulled back what remained of 4th Army over the Sozh despite communication issues making it difficult to transmit orders. Timoshenko first ordered him to "stand fast" or, if not, to defend along the Pronia, west of the Sozh. Indicative of these difficulties, at dawn on July 21 the 13th Army headquarters, which now had the 143rd under command, stated that it had received no information from it. At about the same time the rifle corps were abolished and the 143rd came under direct Army command. As the situation along the Sozh developed on July 23 the STAVKA split off a new Central Front from the southern armies of Western Front, (13th and 21st) and disbanded 4th Army, with its remnant forces assigned to 13th Army. However, the 143rd came directly under Front command. Central Front was intended to cover the junction between Western and Southwestern Fronts while also unrealistically conducting "active operations" toward Gomel and Babruysk.

=== Battles on the Desna ===
During the first week of August Guderian's XXIV Motorized carried out an encirclement operation against 28th Army's Group Kachalov, which had been attacking northward to retake Propoisk. Once this had played out the front stabilized while the German command debated future moves. A new Bryansk Front was formed on August 14, initially with 13th and 50th Armies, although 3rd and 21st were intended to join soon. The Front, under command of Lt. Gen. A. I. Yeryomenko, was directed to create a viable defense along the Desna River. The 13th Army commander, Maj. Gen. K. D. Golubev, began this task in earnest at 1520 hours on August 21, issuing his Combat Order No. 056. His Army was to occupy a line some 70 km in length from 30 km north-northeast to 40 km south of Pogar. The 143rd, which had barely escaped the encirclement by XXIV Motorized but had still taken serious losses during its retreat to the Desna, was acknowledged as being incapable of active operations and was ordered to take up positions south of Saguteva, 20 km southwest of Trubchevsk, for rest and replenishment. Within days a steady stream of replacements sent forward from the Front nominally restored the division to fighting strength, but many of these men were partly-trained reservists and untrained conscripts, and up to half even lacked rifles.

At 1920 hours of the same day, Golubev sent orders to Colonel Kurnosov as follow:

1. The enemy's Starodub grouping has created a threat of spreading out toward the south and southeast, while threatening our left flank at the boundary of 21st Army.
2. To liquidate this threat, as a change to Order No. 056, 143rd RD, with 699th ATR [Antitank Regiment] and 12th AABn [Antiaircraft Battalion] (located in Novgorod-Severskii), will move to and create all-round defenses in the Semenovka [50km west-northwest of Novgorod-Severskii] and Novgorod-Severskii regions by day's end on 22 August 1941.
To strengthen the division, include the remnants of 148th Rifle Division, which is located in Novgorod-Severskii, and one march battalion of 1,000 bayonets, which is being transferred by rail to Pirogovka Station.

By this time Guderian had received orders to advance south into Ukraine, setting up the encirclement of Southwestern Front. However, on August 22 two divisions of XXXXVII Motorized Corps, 17th Panzer and 29th Motorized, began moving east toward the Desna. During the next two days Yeryomenko scrambled to protect or retake Pochep, directing Golubev at 2000 on August 23 to use his 11 rifle, three cavalry, and 50th Tank Division, many of which were remnants, to "defend the Pochep, eastern bank of the Sudost' River, Pogar, Borshchevo, and Luzhki line." Golubev submitted a defense plan to Yeryomenko on August 24, which was approved. Kurnosov was ordered to:

- transfer your defenses at Novgorod-Severskii and Semenovka to 283rd RD and move forward to occupy defenses along the Ponurovka, Voronok, and Luzhki front [70km southwest to 85km west-southwest of Trubchevsk] by 25 August.

He was to establish his command post at Lomakovka. The 143rd had priority for replenishment of forces along with the 6th, 137th, and 155th Divisions. The following day Central Front was disbanded and Bryansk Front expanded to four Armies. Pochep fell to 17th Panzer on the afternoon of August 25, while 3rd Panzer was moving on Novhorod-Siverskyi, where two bridges spanned the Desna. These were defended by the 143rd plus remnants of the 148th; Kurnosov had ordered his men to construct antitank ditches and dig timbers into the ground on the far bank, covered with fire. The first effort by 6th Panzer Regiment and the motorcycle battalion to rush the bridges failed under concentrated Soviet artillery and mortar fire, plus air attacks. The river's flood plain was over 5 km wide here and taking at least one bridge was vital to the German plan.

Overnight the commander of 3rd Panzer, Gen. W. Model, organized a special assault group with anti-demolition training to seize the bridges by coup-de-main, while elements of the 283rd Rifle reinforced the bridgehead. As the artillery preparation began, some of the hastily raised and marginally trained defenders surrendered, while others fought half-heartedly. The armored assault group penetrated into the outskirts of the town and headed for the main bridge under cover of smoke. The raid succeeded in defusing the demolitions on the bridge and it came under German control. Platoon-sized demolition groups from the 143rd and 283rd attempted to climb into the trestle from underneath and destroy the bridge with fuel, explosives, and Molotov cocktails, but they were mostly stopped at the water's edge; a few bags of explosive were placed but soon removed. After the fighting ended Golubev reported that communications had been lost to the 383rd (the replacement for the 487th) and 800th Rifle Regiments, and the 635th had been reduced to 600 mostly unarmed men. On August 27 the 6th Panzer Regiment was sent on a raid to the south which took more bridges and compromised the line of the Desna. Despite this, the STAVKA was informed by Yeryomenko that 13th Army would organize a counterstroke at dawn to retake Starodub and eliminate all German forces west of Novhorod-Siverskyi. The 143rd specifically would "contain the enemy attacks and prevent him from reaching Smiach'e, Sheptaki, and Forostovichi line."

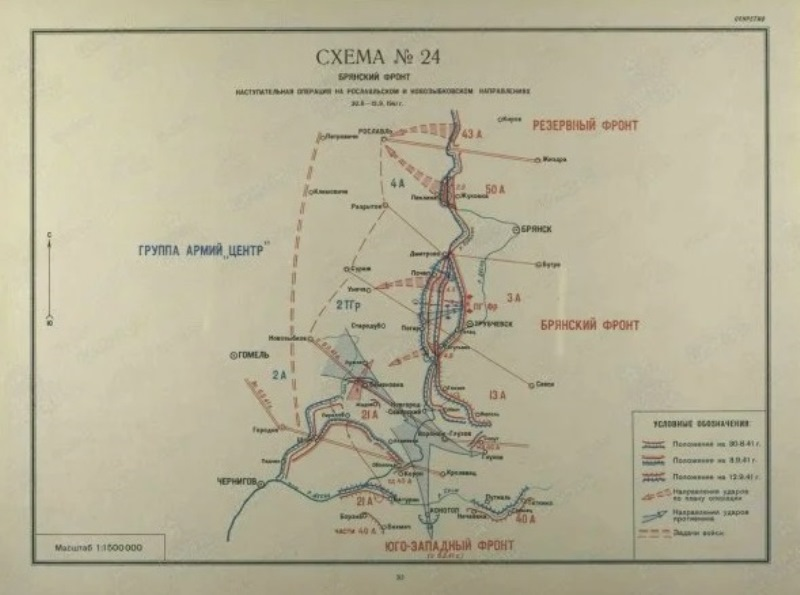
Counterattacks against 2nd Panzer Group (Roslavl-Novozibkov Offensive). Note position of 13th Army.

Golubev reported to Yeryomenko at 0945 hours on August 29 admitting that there was still no information available about the 383rd and 800th Regiments, but that the 635th was assembling in the area of Mikhailovskii Farm, about 20 km south of Novhorod-Siverskyi, still with just 600 unarmed men. In spite of the state of his 11 divisions he was about to be ordered to attack a force with roughly 250 tanks on strength. The STAVKA, still not grasping the significance of Guderian's moves, demanded that Yeryomenko join in on a general counteroffensive by Western and Reserve Fronts set for August 30 and September 1. In his first orders only 13th Army would be involved, but on the morning of August 30 the STAVKA complicated the situation by ordering all of his Front take part. 13th Army, now under command of Maj. Gen. A. M. Gorodnianskii, was to:

continue your attack with the main efforts toward Zheleznyi Most and Semenovka with five divisions and tanks, destroy the enemy's Novgorod-Severskii grouping, together with 3rd Army, and reach the Belaia Dubrovka and Guta-Koretskaia front [155km west to 180km southwest of Bryansk] by 15 September.

This was utterly unrealistic given the Front's inadequate forces, and Guderian's presence in their midst. At this point 13th Army had six rifle divisions under command, plus an airborne corps of two brigades, a cavalry division, a tank division which was soon converted to a tank brigade, and a tank battalion, all of which were in various states of repair. Meanwhile, a 20 km-wide gap separated Bryansk Front and Central Front's 21st Army. On August 31 the 635th Regiment was stated as occupying Vovki and Gutka, with the unarmed contingent still at Mikhailovskii Farm. According to the orders Gorodnianskii received on September 1 he was to form a shock group of three rifle divisions, plus 50th Tank Division (without tanks), and the tank battalion to attack on the morning of September 3, while the 143rd and 121st Divisions, plus the cavalry would cover the boundary with the new 40th Army and "tie the enemy down with strong reconnaissance detachments." 13th Army was now concentrated east of the Desna. He, in turn, ordered Kurnosov to attack toward Kolievka and Ivot, retaking the latter and reaching the river. This was in response to a change of plans by Yeryomenko which changed the composition of the shock group. The attack began on September 2, and by day's end the division was reported as having retaken Kashevka, 20 km east-northeast of Novhorod-Siverskyi, with the 635th and 800th Regiments, totaling 400 armed men, but a composite battalion withdrew after an unsuccessful attack on Ivot. Bryansk Front reported to the STAVKA at 1800 hours on September 3 on the progress of the operation, but had no information on the division and the 52nd Cavalry. A similar report on September 4 stated that the 143rd had received 608 replacements but was holding a defense on a line some 20–25 km east-northeast of Novhorod-Siverskyi, while the unarmed personnel concentrated in a wood north of Seredina Buda. The situation deteriorated the next day, especially on 21st Army's front, and the division's two regiments were completely on the defense, not having reached closer than 2 km from Ivot. By September 6 the offensive had definitely ended, and the 143rd's situation was as follows:

635th RR occupies positions along the line of hills between Kalievka and Antonovka, with one battalion of 800th RR preparing a defensive line along the northern bank of the Bychikha River [25km northeast of Novgorod-Severskii].

No new information was received on September 7. The STAVKA persisted in ordering attacks as late as September 12. On September 16 the 2nd and 1st Panzer Groups officially linked up south of Lokhvytsia, and Southwestern Front was encircled.

== Operation Typhoon ==
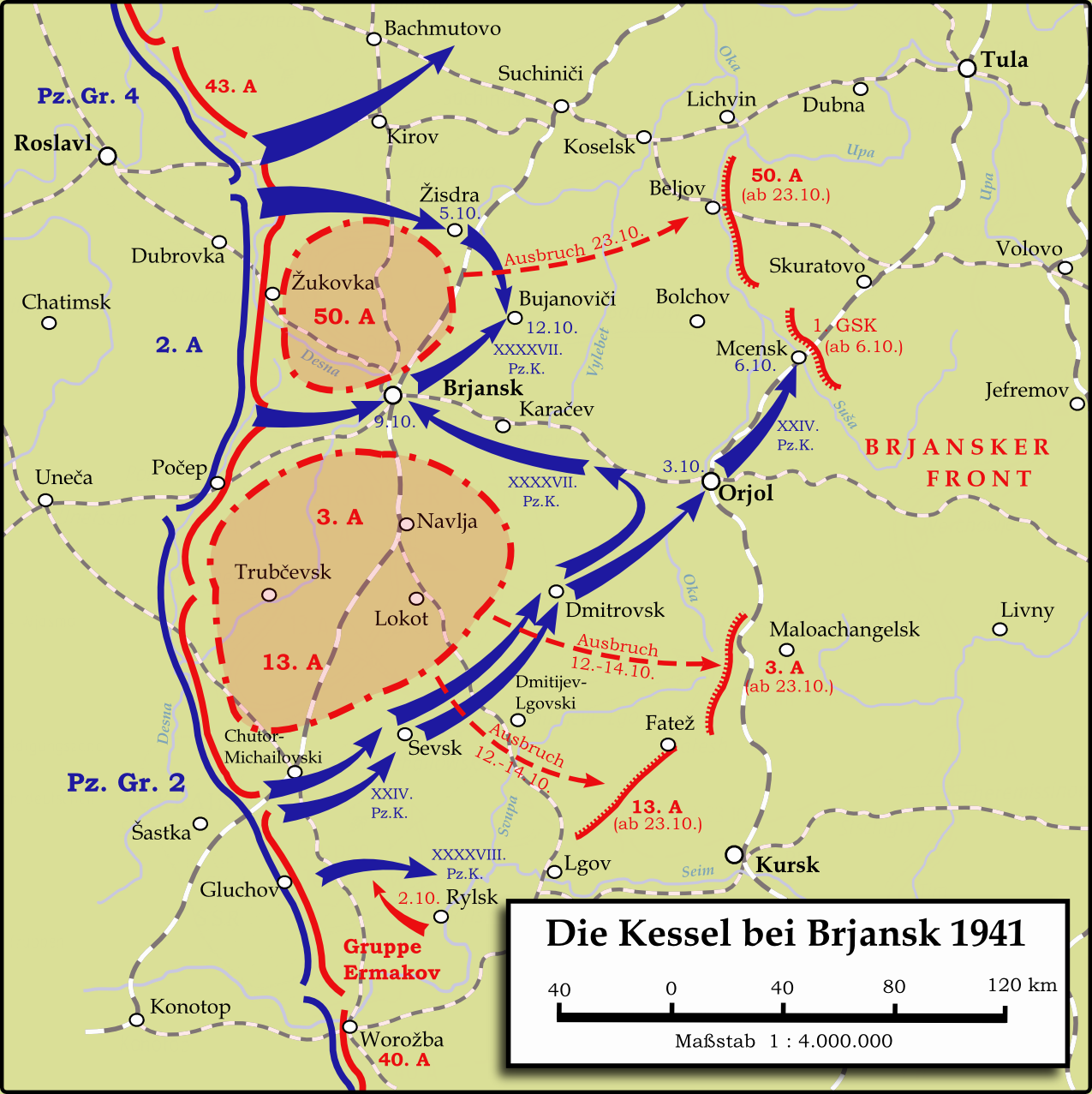
Bryansk encirclement, October 1941. Note position of 13th Army.

Once the Kyiv pocket was eliminated it was obvious that German attentions would again be directed at Moscow. As September continued Bryansk Front was deployed along a 345 km-wide sector, with a total of 25 rifle divisions, one tank and four cavalry divisions. Despite the STAVKA's order to go over to the defense around the 12th, Yeryomenko continued to order attacks to win local objectives, and between September 11–20 lost some 18,750 personnel; he completely failed to appreciate that Guderian could quickly disengage from the battle in east Ukraine and redirect toward Moscow. Even in the last ten days of the month the left-flank units of 13th Army and the so-called Group Yermakov were being ordered to attack and retake Hlukhiv. Due to skillful use of German reserves these efforts were repeatedly defeated. Soviet intelligence pointed to the signs of an upcoming German offensive, but a further attack by the 143rd, 132nd, and 307th Rifle Divisions was set for 0630 hours on September 27. Yeryomenko finally acquiesced to the STAVKA and cancelled it, ordering Gorodnianskii to put 13th Army on a defensive posture, with reserves and second echelons. Only 48 hours remained until the opening of Operation Typhoon.

2nd Panzer Group struck on September 30 south of 13th Army, while 2nd Army attacked toward Bryansk on October 2, cutting between 3rd and 50th Armies. The panzers struck the boundary between Gorodnianskii and Group Yermakov, moving in the direction of Sevsk. It was not until October 2 that this situation became clear to the STAVKA, which sent orders to Yeryomenko via 13th Army headquarters, demanding a counterstrike the next morning. This was initially to involve four divisions, even though their current locations were not entirely known due to a steady breakdown in communications. In the afternoon of October 3 Gorodnianskii reported that German forces had taken Golubovka, Ulitsa, and Suzemki on his left flank while remaining inactive on his right. He now chose to regroup on his left for an attack toward Khutor-Mikhailovskii in order to get into the German rear. The 143rd "was to destroy the enemy in Golubovka (18km west of Seredina-Buda) and to develop the offensive to the northeast." This effort, by three divisions, would be supported by just six tanks. The German forces were well prepared for such a measure, and also dominated the air. The counterstroke failed completely, at the cost of heavy losses in personnel and heavy weapons, and the 143rd was forced to retreat to the east. It was reported as now being armed with nine light and four heavy machine guns, one 50mm, two 82mm, and three 120mm mortars, and a single 45mm antitank gun. On the same day the 4th Panzer Division broke into Oryol from the march after a 200 km advance in four days.

On October 4 the XXXXVII Motorized took Lokot, 45 km north of Sevsk, before pivoting toward Karachev and Bryansk. 13th Army was now deeply enveloped from the east. At 2340 hours Gorodnianskii was ordered to take up a defensive stance by preparing a second defensive belt, but at 1145 on October 6 was tasked with holding his current lines while also attacking toward Suzemka and Seredina-Buda with his main forces, largely the 6th and 143rd, and then on to Sevsk in conjunction with 3rd Army and Group Yermakov, a clear impossibility. By October 8 the 13th Army had taken large losses and overnight regrouped to clear an escape path. The main attack would be led by the 143rd and 132nd, plus the 141st Tank Brigade. The commander of the 132nd, Maj. Gen. S. S. Biryuzov, deliberately broadcast a false order in the clear over the radio, stating that the attack should be made toward Uralovo and Khilchichi, and this proved effective.

=== Breakout from encirclement ===
Lt. Gen. M. A. Kozlov, who served as a member of 13th Army's military council for most of the war, later related how the breakout took place:

8 October. As the army was preparing to break out, and order arrived from Lieutenant-General M. P. Petrov [commander of 50th Army, who was killed in action two days later] about escaping the encirclement in the Dmitrovsk–Orvolskii–Kromy–Zmievka direction...
Early on the morning of 9 October, the breakthrough detachments of the 132nd and 143rd Rifle Divisions with attached tanks of the 141st Tank Brigade went on the attack in the Negino area. Simultaneously, all the tractors parked in this area on the edge of the woods started up their engines and imitated the movement of tanks with their noise. The artillery battalion poured fire on the enemy positions. The attack was unexpected and successful. In Negino we destroyed up to a regiment of infantry, captured the regiment's headquarters, and smashed 15 antitank guns. The 132nd and 143rd Rifle Divisions together with the 13th Army headquarters' forward echelon passed through Negino.

Within three hours German reserves managed to close this gap, and 6th Division was forced to punch a new hole for itself, the Army's second echelon, and Gorodnianskii's reserves. The next day the 132nd retook an important German supply hub near the Hlukhiv–Sevsk highway, inflicting losses on a German motorized column that had stopped for a rest.

Despite this success, the breakout force was soon surrounded again by elements of XXXV Army Corps and XXXXVIII Motorized Corps. 13th Army received fuel by airdrop, but in insufficient quantities. On October 17 the Army's military council decided to destroy the immobile motor transport and other immovable materiel. All remaining artillery ammunition was fired off, and the guns themselves were permanently disabled. Units of the Army managed to escape by crossing a bridge over the Svapa River owing to an attack from outside by an operational group organized by Yeryomenko. During this passage they destroyed numbers of German vehicles that had bogged down in mud. Approximately 10,000 reached friendly territory on October 18 with their small arms and 11 artillery pieces. The 143rd had 1,250 men remaining, and was sent to 50th Army, which was now under command of Maj. Gen. A. N. Yermakov. By October 22, 13th Army was holding a defensive line of some 45 km northwest of Kursk.

=== Counteroffensive and Case Blue ===
During November the division, still grossly below strength, was forced back by the still-advancing German forces in the Livny area, but with the start of the December counteroffensive 13th Army struck back against German 2nd Army, retaking Livny and Yelets before the front settled down again. On December 18 Bryansk Front, which had been disbanded after Typhoon, was recreated with the 3rd, 13th, and 61st Armies under command of Col. Gen. Ya. T. Cherevichenko. During January 1942 he led his forces forward to the line Belyov–Mtsensk–Verkhovye. The 143rd would remain part of 13th Army until January 1943. Maj. Gen. N. P. Pukhov took command of the Army on January 25.

At the start of Case Blue 40th Army formed the left wing of the Front, facing the spearheads of 4th Panzer Army with some 700 tanks. 40th Army had roughly 250 tanks on strength. If 40th Army failed to fend off this attack the Front's center would be in danger. 13th Army now sat astride the Sosna River west of Livny with four rifle divisions in first echelon, the 143rd and 15th south of the river, and the 148th and 132nd north of it; the 307th was in second echelon with the 109th Rifle Brigade. Pukhov had about 210 tanks available, including 1st Tank Corps. The offensive began on June 28 with two panzer corps advancing in tandem along three routes, tearing large gaps in the defenses of 40th and 21st Armies. 11th Panzer Division passed the Tim River and pushed ahead 10 km, breaking the line of the 15th Division. Otherwise, 13th Army was largely spared as the German force struck toward the east. The 143rd was still far from full strength, with its rifle regiments numbering 600-700 men each, while the 287th Artillery had an unusual composition of four batteries of 76mm cannons and two batteries of 152mm howitzers. The division saw little action over the following months, and on October 1 Kurnosov was promoted to the rank of major general.

=== Voronezh-Kastornoye Offensive ===
On January 10, 1943, Kurnosov was made deputy commander of 13th Army's rear services, where he would remain well into the postwar. He was replaced by Col. Aleksandr Alekseevich Startsev, who had previously led the 1023rd Rifle Regiment of the 307th Division. By mid-January it was clear that a massive victory was about to be won at Stalingrad, and the STAVKA set about planning to expand this success on other fronts. By January 20 Bryansk Front, now under command of Lt. Gen. M. A. Reyter, and consisting of 3rd, 13th, and 48th Armies, plus 15th Air Army, was on a line from Bolshye Golubochki to Novosil to Gremyachaya to Kozinka. 13th Army, now with seven rifle divisions, including the rebuilt 143rd, formed the Front's left wing, on a 100 km-wide zone from Sidorovka to Kozinka, much as it had been since the previous July. However, just before the start of the offensive Reyter carried out a regrouping. The sector of the front from Sidorovka to Yasnaya Polyana, along with the 143rd and 74th Rifle Divisions holding it, were turned over to 48th Army and so did not take part.

== Operation Gallop ==
The turn of 48th Army, soon to be commanded by Lt. Gen. P. L. Romanenko, came as part of a new plan by Marshal G. K. Zhukov, issued at 2200 hours on January 26. Kursk had been added to the objectives to be taken during the overall winter offensive, and was assigned to Bryansk and Voronezh Fronts, which had already scored a significant victory at Kastornoye. Gallop kicked off on February 2, and Reyter's military council reported on the gains:

[2 February]
The left wing divisions of the 48th Army (the 143rd and 137th Rifle Divisions), having cleared the eastern bank of the Zelenka and Foshnia Rivers in the Manino, Tatarinovo, and Beketovo sector of the enemy, are prepared to attack northwestward beginning on the morning of 3 February.

It further reported that by 1600-1700 the 143rd was at Temenskoe and Krasnyi Ugolok with its forward detachments at Pokrovka. Reyter stated that he would commit his 73rd Rifle Division to develop the success of the 143rd and 137th.

The advance continued to develop the next day, and at 2200 hours the Front reported that, while the bulk of 48th Army held its positions, the 143rd captured Ulianovka and Ivanovka by 1400 and was fighting along a line from Dobroe to Nachalo to Novofedorovka. At midnight on February 5 it was reported that 48th Army was running into increasing fire resistance; nevertheless the 73rd, 137th, and 143rd had cleared a number of settlements, capturing Krasnyi Pakhar, Nepochataya, Nikolskoe 2, Shalimovo 1 and 2, and Kishevka while currently fighting for Enino 1 and Kriukovo. At this time the forces of the re-created Central Front were beginning to arrive, some of them all the way from Stalingrad, and on February 8 units of 60th Army liberated Kursk. The 143rd was currently due south of Droskovo, and at the end of the next day it was reported as having taken Hill 236.4, northeast of Orlovka. The next major target was Maloarkhangelsk, which was to be taken on February 10. However, German resistance was stiffening, and the offensive was running on a logistical shoestring, largely due to the winter weather.

Maloarkhangelsk had finally been taken on February 23, but Bryansk Front was now running up against well-fortified positions east of Bolkhov and east and west of Trosna. Reiter formed four shock groups to attack northwest and west across the Neruch River of a 55 km-wide front from 15 km northwest of Maloarkhangelsk to Krasnoe Pole, 25 km southwest of Novosil. The 143rd and 137th, supported by the 28th and 30th Guards Tank Regiments, were slated to make a supporting attack further north along the Pokrovskoye–Oryol road against the 216th Infantry Division. All of Reiter's divisions were now down to 3,000-4,500 personnel each. The push began on March 6, but made no impression on the German defenses at the cost of heavy casualties. By March 11 the Front's forces were reduced to conducting reconnaissance and fending off German patrols. By now the counteroffensive by Army Group South was well underway and this, plus the upcoming spring rasputitsa, brought further offensive activity to a halt.

== Battle of Kursk ==
Later in March 48th Army was transferred to Central Front, which was under command of Army Gen. K. K. Rokossovskii. On June 17 Colonel Startsev left the 143rd, and would not hold another divisional command until August 1944 when he took over the 367th Rifle Division. He was replaced by Col. Dmitrii Ivanovich Lukin.

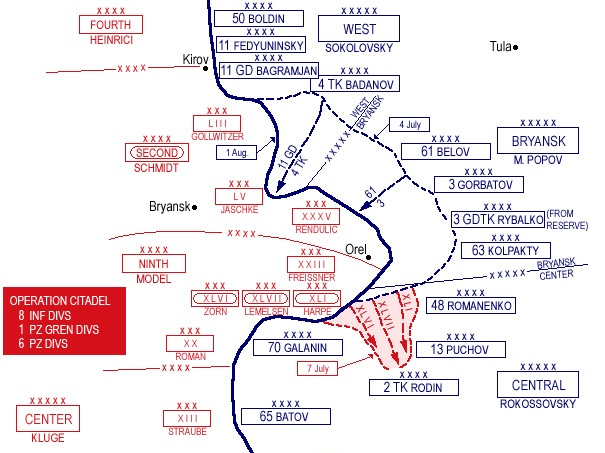
Map of Operation Kutuzov. Note position of 48th Army.

At the start of the Kursk offensive on July 5 the reinforced 48th was holding a front line sector 38 km wide from the boundary with Bryansk Front to Droskovo–Stepanishchevo. Romanenko had deployed three divisions (73rd, 143rd, 16th Lithuanian) in first echelon and his remaining four (137th, 170th, 399th, 202nd) in second echelon within the second defensive zone. The 2nd Antitank Brigade was in Army reserve, concentrated in the area of Vorovo and Vyazovoi. There were three regiments of tanks deployed behind the Army's left flank between the second and rear defense zones, and the 1168th Cannon Artillery Regiment plus three self-propelled artillery regiments were also in support. Romanenko had his headquarters at Perekhozhee. While the possibility of the main German attack from the north striking 48th Army was anticipated it was considered more likely to come against 13th Army to its left. In the event the assault by German 9th Army followed the more likely path and 48th Army played little role in the defensive battle. By July 15 the German forces had been fought to a standstill and the 48th, 13th, 70th, and 2nd Tank Armies were prepared to go over to the counteroffensive against the German grouping in the Oryol salient.

=== Operation Kutuzov ===
Prior to the start of this counteroffensive the 143rd rejoined 13th Army, still in Central Front, and was assigned to 15th Rifle Corps. This Army, now with four rifle corps, two rifle divisions, 9th Tank Corps, and various reinforcements, was ordered to attack on the morning of July 15, leading with three rifle corps and the tank corps. 15th Corps was on a line from Krasnaya Slobodka to Grinevka to Bazhenovo, on the Army's right flank. Most of the Front's reinforcements had been concentrated in the Army's sector. Extensive reconnaissance was carried out, as well as artillery and air attacks to interfere with defensive preparations. Western and Bryansk Fronts had already begun the offensive against the Oryol salient on July 12, and German forces were already shifting northward to meet it. The 13th would cooperate 48th and 70th Armies, plus 16th Air Army, to defeat the German forces they faced, and by dusk on July 17 reach a line from Novopolevo to Kamenka to Lebedikha, before developing the attack toward Staroe Gorokhovo, Filosovo, and Nesterovo.

Central Front attacked at 0600 after a 15-minute artillery bombardment. Despite stubborn resistance, based in part on a large number of dug-in tanks, some damaged in the earlier fighting, by 0800 13th Army's advance elements were 2–3 km into the German position and had captured Snova, Podsoborovka, and Saborovka before being halted. The next morning 2nd Tank Army entered the breach and penetrated the German formations along the Senkovo axis, which were attempting to hold 13th Army's old front line defenses. The armor began advancing north at a quick pace. By the end of July 17 the 13th and 70th Armies had completely restored their original positions while 2nd Tanks was well into the original German lines. Over the following weeks the Front advanced against a slowly retreating 9th Army until on August 1 the withdrawal to the Hagen position at the base of the salient began, which was completed on August 17. Oryol itself fell to forces of Bryansk Front on August 5. Before that, the 143rd was removed to the Reserve of the Supreme High Command for rest and rebuilding on July 31.

== Into Ukraine ==
When the division returned to the front on August 24 it was assigned to the 77th Rifle Corps of Central Front's 60th Army. On August 26 Central Front resumed the offensive against Army Group Center, striking at the 9th Army's right flank east of Karachev and near 2nd Army's center at Sevsk and east of Klintsy. The thrust at Sevsk scored a deep penetration and the German Army Group committed what reserves it had to a counterattack against it on August 29. This left an opening for 60th Army to make a sudden advance to Yesman, 40 km behind 2nd Army's south flank. Rokossovskii now regrouped 13th Army and 2nd Tank Army from his right to his left flank to exploit this success.

Over the following days 2nd Army retreated to the Desna River as Rokossovskii shifted his attention to the left (north) flank of 4th Panzer Army. During this advance the 143rd earned its first battle honor:

KONOTOP – ...143rd Rifle Division (Col. Lukin, Dmitrii Ivanovich)... The troops that participated in the liberation of Konotop and Bakhmach, by order of the Supreme Commander-in-Chief of 9 September 1943 and a commendation in Moscow, are given a salute of 12 artillery salvoes by 120 guns.

On the same day elements of Central Front crossed the Desna south of Novhorod-Siverskyi, where the division had fought two years earlier, and at Otsekin and between September 16 and 18 the 7th Guards Mechanized Corps aimed a two-pronged thrust northward across the Desna on either side of Chernihiv which collapsed the south flank of 2nd Army. The Front now continued its advance toward the Dniepr in the direction of Kyiv. Colonel Lukin left the division on September 22, and was replaced by Col. Mitrofan Moiseevich Zaikin. This intelligence officer had previously served as chief of staff of several formations, including most recently the 24th Rifle Corps, after having been hospitalized with wounds for about eight months. He would be promoted to the rank of major general on September 13, 1944, and led the division until it was disbanded.

=== Battles for Kyiv ===
On September 30 the commander of Voronezh Front's (as of October 20 1st Ukrainian) 38th Army, Maj. Gen. N. E. Chibisov, presented a plan to his Front commander, Army Gen. N. F. Vatutin, to capture Kyiv through a double envelopment by two rifle corps. This overly ambitious plan did create a pair of bridgeheads, but the attempt collapsed by October 3. At midnight on October 5 both the 60th and 13th Armies were transferred from Central Front. They were to join 38th Army in a further effort to take the city from the north.

On October 6 Vatutin assigned the following task to 60th Army's commander, Lt. Gen. I. D. Chernyakhovskii, after assigning him the 17th Guards Rifle Corps and the 1st Guards Cavalry Corps: to clear the south bank of the Uzh River on October 6–7 and take a bridgehead on the south bank of the Teteriv River on a sector from Pilyava to Zatonsk. Overnight on October 7/8 the 1st Guards Cavalry would cross the Dniepr and the Teteriv, then launch a main attack to the southwest between the Zdvizh and Irpen Rivers, rolling up the German front. Chernyakhovskii decided to lead with 1st Guards Cavalry and 77th Corps toward Manuilsk and Litvinovka, with 24th and 30th Rifle Corps supporting with an attack toward Dymer. However, this plan did not hold up due to divergent axes of the various corps.

A German counteroffensive by elements of 7th Panzer, 399th Infantry, and 217th Infantry Divisions struck 60th Army heavily in the Hornostaipil area throughout October 6–7, after which the panzers were pulled back to reserve near Ivanivka. The next day Chernyakhovskii took the initiative at Hornostaipil, and mutual attacks also began south of Chornobil on October 9. By October 10, 60th Army had a large number of Dniepr crossings in operation, including a 30-ton capacity low-water bridge, four 30-ton ferries, 12 two to 12 ton ferries, and a landing crossing. On this date it was reported that the strength of the 143rd had dropped quite low, with just 3,045 personnel, lowest in the Army, with 26 82mm and nine 120mm mortars, seven 76mm regimental and 19 76mm divisional guns, but a full allotment of 12 122mm howitzers.

At noon on October 11 the 60th and 38th Armies attacked simultaneously as German counterattacks struck back, including at 77th Corps along both banks of the Teteriv. A particularly strong attack by 7th and 8th Panzer south of the river reached the rear of 1st Guards Cavalry and cut it off from its crossings. The Army's 17th and 18th Guards Rifle Corps, on a secondary axis, made no progress at all. Further efforts to gain traction over the next three days were also futile, with German tanks breaking through to the bridgehead at Lyutizh at one point. At 0150 hours on October 15 Vatutin signaled Chernyakhovskii as follows:

The army's forces are unsuccessful along almost all sectors and are standing in place. The chief reason for this is the dispersion of men and materiel...
If you do not adopt decisive measures for pushing the 1st Guards Cavalry Corps forward into the enemy's depth, then there is a danger that the cavalry corps will be transformed into a typical rifle formation...
I order:
1. To plan and organize the breakthrough of the enemy's front along a narrow sector, by creating an artillery density of no less than 150 tubes per kilometre of front.

In a further message, Vatutin stressed the significance of linking up the bridgeheads of 60th and 38th Armies.

The offensive was renewed on October 15 at 1400 hours. 60th Army made only minor gains, taking the village of Rovy. Only part of the Army attacked the next day, again with little success. Meanwhile, 1st Guards Cavalry was suffering significant losses trying to break out, and it was not until overnight on October 17/18 that its relief by 77th Corps began, and it began its transfer to 38th Army. 60th Army was now officially on the defensive. During October 18–23 it was involved in heavy fighting as German forces repeatedly tried to collapse the bridgehead over the Teteriv. At 2300 the next day the STAVKA released directive No. 30232, which set out the plan and date for a renewed offensive. Most importantly, the 3rd Guards Tank Army would be secretly removed from the bridgehead south of Kyiv at Velykyi Bukryn and shifted to the Lyutizh bridgehead.

A major regrouping took place during October 25-November 1, entirely at night or covered by smoke screens. By the latter date up to seven divisions faced 60th Army, quite a high concentration, although all were significantly under strength. While the 143rd was also well below its authorized strength, its total personnel had been brought up to 6,729, largely through drafting Ukrainians from the retaken territory. The Army's task was much as previous, to attack in the direction of Rovy and Dymer with nine divisions and then advance between the Zdvizh and Irpin, covering the flank of 38th Army while the latter took Kyiv and it captured the railway from the city to Korosten. Subsequently, the offensive would be developed to the west. Six divisions, including the 143rd, and a tank regiment would be in first echelon; 77th Corps was designated to make a secondary attack with the 143rd and 132nd toward Sychevka, Manuilsk and Andreevka. Its breakthrough sector was 3 km wide, and it would be supported by 53.3 guns and mortars per kilometre, with an opening bombardment of 40 minute duration.

The offensive opened at 0800 hours on November 3 and the first echelon attacked at 0840 in the face of heavy defensive fire and counterattacks. 77th Corps (now 143rd, 132nd, and 280th Divisions) broke through the defense along the entire breakthrough sector, took Sychevka, and advanced another 4 km to the west. The terrain was heavily forested, and the artillery began displacing forward to deal with strongpoints at close range. Five counterattacks by tanks and infantry were repelled, and 550 prisoners were taken by the two Armies, but the first day objectives were not completely met, and Chernyakhovskii was constantly urged to increase his pace. The following day the 143rd and 132nd continued to advance, gaining as much as 6 km while taking Manuilsk and Andreevka. The fighting continued overnight, and on November 5 the Army gained another 20 km along its left wing, but the next day the 143rd and 280th maintained a defensive front while the 132nd failed to make progress west of Manuilsk. Meanwhile, 38th Army was fighting in the center and southwest of Kyiv.

==== Advance from Kyiv ====
During November 6, while 77th Corps continued to hold its previous positions, other elements of 60th Army advanced up to 12 km on the left flank. 38th Army completed clearing Kyiv early in the morning and then advanced another 20 km. 8th Panzer withdrew across the Zdvizh, and the Kyiv–Korosten railroad was cut. However, the Army was beginning to face serious shortages of ammunition and fuel. Vatutin ordered the offensive to continue into western Ukraine with 60th Army directed to take bridgeheads over the Teteriv in the area of Radomyshl by the end of November 9. The general line of advance was to be to the west on the Korosten axis. By the end of November 8 the Army gained another 10 km against weak resistance. The next day the Teteriv was crossed and over 100 prisoners were taken, along with a large quantity of abandoned equipment. By this time 60th and 38th Armies were spread along an attack front of some 220 km, and the German forces facing the 60th were retreating southwest toward Zhytomyr.

==== Kiev Strategic Defensive Operation ====
By November 12 the artillery was increasingly falling behind the advancing infantry and very little ammunition was at the front. The STAVKA was concerned that Vatutin was failing to consolidate captured ground and also noted increasing counterattacks. 38th Army was ordered to take up a static defense, while 60th moved a total of four divisions into Front reserve. During November 15 the 38th was struck by heavy counterattacks on several sectors, and lost some ground. The next day Chernyakhovskii was given responsibility for defending Zhytomyr "to the last man." Despite the worsening situation there, the 143rd, after an advance against soft opposition from the 291st Infantry Division, on November 17 consolidated on a 16 km-wide line from Vaskovichi to Bekhi while the 226th Rifle Division captured Korosten. Overnight on November 18/19 the divisions that were encircled at Zhytomyr were ordered to break out with the help of 30th Corps, while the rest of the Army was to defend along its present lines. The fighting intensified through November 22 when the weather finally cleared for the 2nd Air Army. The 291st Infantry had lingered near Korosten and put itself in order while also receiving reinforcements. These forces went over to the counterattack on November 24 and encircled the 226th. Chernyakhovskii ordered it to hold at all costs as reinforcements were brought up and the fighting continued until nearly the end of the month, but the 226th was eventually forced to break out. The front finally stabilized on November 30.

=== Zhitomir-Berdichev Offensive ===
The Front returned to the offensive on December 24 on both sides of the Zhytomyr–Kyiv highway. LIX Army Corps was attempting to hold Korosten against 13th and 60th Armies, which went over to the attack the following day. XXXXVIII Panzer Corps attempted to hem in and slow down the spearheads, with little effect. By December 29 LIX Corps was in full retreat to the west, and the division was soon awarded its second honorific:

KOROSTEN – ...143rd Rifle Division (Col. Zaikin, Mitrofan Mioseevich)... The troops that participated in the liberation of Korosten, by order of the Supreme Commander-in-Chief of 30 December 1943 and a commendation in Moscow, are given a salute of 20 artillery salvoes by 224 guns.

The next day 77th Corps was transferred to 13th Army, still in 1st Ukrainian Front.

By January 3, 1944, what remained of LIX Corps had been forced back to Horodnytsia on the pre-1939 border with Poland. Over the remainder of the month the pursuit continued toward Rivne and Lutsk, and on January 17 the 143rd was awarded the Order of the Red Banner for its successes in this advance. Those places were taken by February 2 and March 1, after which the front stabilized. By the latter date the division, along with the rest of 77th Corps, had been transferred to 47th Army in the new 2nd Belorussian Front. This Front would be reabsorbed into 1st Belorussian Front in April. The 143rd would remain in this Army and Front for the duration of the war.

== Operation Bagration ==
At the start of the summer offensive against Army Group Center on June 22/23 the 77th Corps contained the 132nd, 143rd, 185th and 234th Rifle Divisions and 47th Army was one of five Armies on the western flank of the Front, south of the Pripet Marshes in the area of Kovel, and so played no role in the initial stages of the offensive.

=== Lublin–Brest Offensive ===
The west wing Armies joined the offensive at 0530 hours on July 18, following a 30-minute artillery preparation. 47th Army's shock group had been shifted to its left flank during July 13–16. Forward detachments of battalion or regimental size attacked and soon determined that the German first and part of the second trench lines had been abandoned, so a further 110-minute preparation was cancelled. The leading Armies (47th, 8th Guards and 69th) reached the second defense zone along the Vyzhuvka River on July 19 and quickly forced a crossing, which led to the zone's collapse by noon, followed by a pursuit of the defeated forces, advancing 20–25 km. On August 9 the 143rd would receive the Order of Suvorov, 2nd Degree, for its part in breaking the German defenses around Kovel.

On July 20 the leading Armies reached the final defense line along the Western Bug River and began taking crossing points off the march with their mobile units. 47th Army was now being led by the 2nd Guards Cavalry Corps, and by dusk was fighting along a line from outside Zalesie to Grabowo to Zabuzhye after a further advance of 18–26 km. The Front's forces were now in a position to begin the encirclement of the German forces around Brest.

The main forces of the Front's left wing were directed against Lublin on July 21, while 47th Army, along with a mobile group of 2nd Guards Cavalry and 11th Tank Corps, was tasked with reaching Siedlce. By the end of July 23 the Army had reached the line Danze–Podewucze–Pszwloka, following an advance of 52 km in three days. By July 27 it was running into greater resistance, especially in the area of Biała Podlaska and Mendzizec, which blocked the encirclement of part of the Brest grouping. On July 29 Brest was finally encircled and taken, with Siedlce falling on July 31. By this time, 47th Army was spread across a front of 74 km. Meanwhile, on July 28 the 2nd Tank Army was approaching the Praga suburb of Warsaw, which the STAVKA soon gave orders to be seized, along with bridgeheads over the Vistula River. This Army's attack soon ran into heavy resistance and stalled. The Praga area contained complex and modern fortifications and would prove a hard nut to crack. The German command soon struck with a powerful counterattack of five panzer and one infantry divisions against the boundary of 2nd Tank and 47th Armies in an effort to hold the place, and 2nd Tank was ordered not to attempt to storm the fortifications, but to wait for heavy artillery. In addition, both Armies were suffering severe shortages of fuel and ammunition after the long advance.

=== Battle for Praga ===
The Front commander, Marshal Rokossovskii, planned to take Praga no later than August 8. This was to be carried out by the 2nd Tank, 47th, 28th, and 70th Armies. By August 9 it was clear this had failed, and in fact some ground had been lost. The next day, the 47th was to launch an attack toward Kossow and Wyszków. On September 5, most of the Front went over to the defensive, but the battle for Praga went on until September 14, when the fortress was finally taken, and the 800th Rifle Regiment (Major Kolomiychenko, Ivan Dmitriievich) received its name as a battle honor, while on October 31 the 487th Regiment would be awarded the Order of the Red Banner and the 635th Regiment received the Order of Suvorov, 3rd Degree, for the same battle.

== Into Poland and Germany ==
In November the 143rd was transferred to the 129th Rifle Corps, still in 47th Army. At the start of January 1945, prior to the start of the winter offensive into Poland, the Corps also contained the 132nd and 260th Rifle Divisions. For this offensive 1st Belorussian Front, now under command of Marshal Zhukov, was ordered to launch a supporting attack north of Warsaw with the 47th along a 4 km-wide front for the purpose of clearing the German forces between the Vistula and Western Bug, in conjunction with the left wing of 2nd Belorussian Front. Following this the Army was to outflank Warsaw from the northeast and help capture the city in cooperation with the 1st Polish Army and part of 61st and 2nd Guards Tank Armies.

The main offensive began on January 12 but 47th Army did not begin its attack until January 15, with a 55-minute artillery preparation. By day's end it had cleared the inter-river area east of Modlin. Overnight the 129th Corps forced a crossing of the frozen Vistula. On January 17 the 1st Polish Army began the fight for Warsaw and, threatened with encirclement, the German garrison abandoned it. As a result of this success the 635th Rifle Regiment (Major Korobov, Fyodor Petrovich) and the 287th Artillery Regiment (Major Afanasev, Stepan Semyonovich) were awarded "Warsaw" as an honorific. Following this success the STAVKA ordered an all-out advance to the Oder River. 47th Army reached the Bzura by 1800 hours that same day. As the Front's right flank lengthened to 110–120 km by January 25 the 47th, 1st Polish, and 3rd Shock Armies were brought up to guard against any counteroffensive from German forces in East Pomerania. By the end of the next day elements of the Army captured Bydgoszcz and Nakło nad Notecią.

Over the following weeks the Front's right wing forces eliminated the German garrisons blockaded in Schneidemühl, Deutsch Krone, and Arnswalde, but otherwise gained only up to 10 km of ground. For their roles in the taking of Deutsch Krone the 800th Rifle Regiment and the 287th Artillery Regiment were given the Order of Suvorov, 3rd Degree and Order of Kutuzov, 3rd Degree, respectively, on April 5. The German 11th Army launched a hastily planned counteroffensive at Stargard on February 15 and two days later the 47th Army was forced to abandon the towns of Piritz and Bahn and fall back 8–12 km.

=== East Pomeranian Offensive ===
After the Stargard offensive was shut down on February 18, Zhukov decided split the 11th Army by attacking toward the Baltic Sea. 47th Army was tasked with reaching and taking the city of Altdamm. This was accomplished on March 20, and the Army began regrouping toward Berlin. On April 6, General Zaikin was made a Hero of the Soviet Union in recognition of his personal leadership in the crossing operation over the Vistula in January.

== Berlin Offensive ==
At the start of the final offensive on the German capital the 47th Army was deployed in the bridgehead over the Oder at Küstrin on a 8 km-wide sector. In the days just before the attack commenced the 143rd was one of five divisions of the Army that relieved the right-flank divisions of 5th Shock Army. The 47th planned to make its main strike in the center, a 4.3 km sector from Neulewin to Neubarnim. The 129th Corps now consisted of the 143rd, 132nd, and 82nd Rifle Divisions, and all three were in first echelon. At this time the rifle divisions' strengths varied between 5,000 and 6,000 men each. The divisions in first echelon had the immediate goal of penetrating the defense to a depth of 4.5–5 km, which would carry them through the first two German positions. The Army was supported by 101 tanks and self-propelled guns.

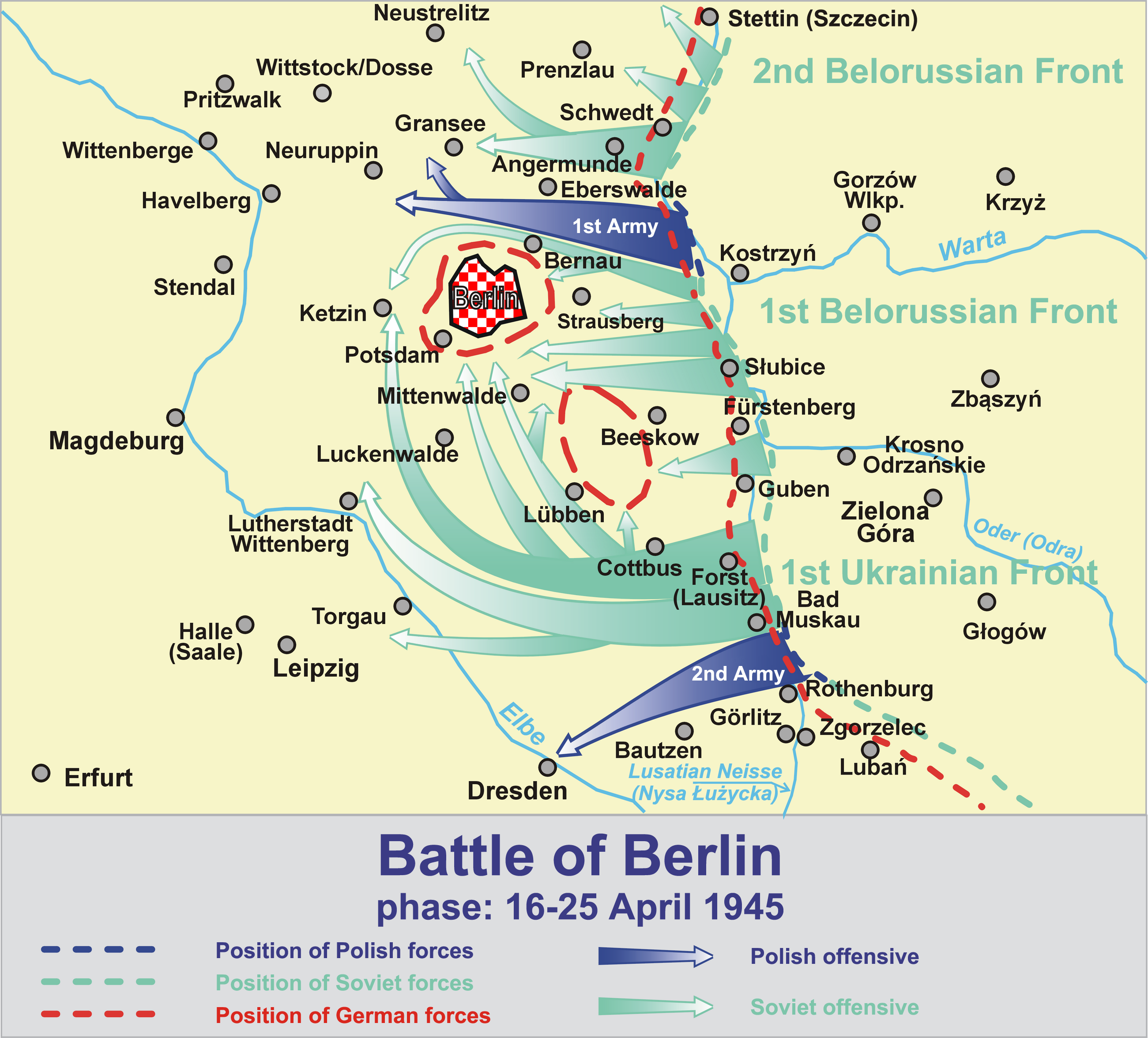
Battle of Berlin. Note location of the Küstrin (Kostrzyn) bridgehead.

During April 14–15, 47th Army carried out reconnaissance actions from Karlsbiese to outside Ortwig with scout units of five divisions. The main offensive began before dawn on April 16 on the sectors of 1st Belorussian and 1st Ukrainian Fronts. A massive artillery bombardment was launched at 0500 hours, except on the fronts of 47th and 33rd Armies. On 47th Army's front the bombardment started 0550 and lasted 25 minutes. The infantry went into the attack at 0615 against defenders that were badly shaken and had suffered significant casualties. The 82nd Division failed to reach the forward edge of the German defense by the end of the bombardment, causing an extension of five minutes. 129th Corps suppressed the German fire resistance, drove off a counterattack, and cleared the strongpoint at Neubarnim. After an advance of 6 km it reached a line from Herrenhof to Neunzigert. Overall, 47th Army had broken through the main defensive zone, and on its left flank reached the intermediate defense position.

Zhukov ordered that the attack continue through the night, following a 30-40-minute artillery preparation, so as to break through the intermediate defense position. 47th Army made some progress through the dark, but its general offensive began at 0800 hours after another 30-minute preparation. 129th Corps, still with three divisions in line, repelled a pair of counterattacks, forced a crossing of the Friedlanderstrom Canal between the 150th and 171st Rifle Divisions, and ended the day on a line from the southern outskirts of Wewe to the northern outskirts of Kunersdorf. In the afternoon one division was pulled back to second echelon, and the Corps recorded a gain of 4 km. Overnight, the troops of the Front consolidated their positions and took part in reconnaissance. After a short artillery preparation the offensive continued on the morning of April 18.

47th Army stepped off at 1000 hours after a 40-minute bombardment and through the day 129th Corps covered another 4 km. Despite the day's successes Zhukov was becoming concerned that the offensive was proceeding too slowly, and ordered that steps be taken to improve command and control, beginning on April 19. In addition, the 47th, as well as the 3rd Shock and 5th Shock Armies, were to shift their axes of attack from northwest and west to west and southwest, with the objective of breaking into Berlin as quickly as possible. Specifically, the 47th was directed to advance on Haselberg, Baiersdorf, Schildow, and Hermsdorf; these last two were in the northern part of the city.

Fighting on April 19 was focused on the third defensive zone which now contained German reserves moved up from the city. 47th Army had brought up its artillery overnight and made its main attack at noon, following an artillery preparation of 30 minutes. 129th Corps, still with two divisions up and one back, now had the direct assistance of 9th Guards Tank Corps and this helped it capture German strongpoints at Frankenfelde and Sternebeck after heavy fighting. Following this it advanced 12 km to reach a line from the Markgrafensee to Bisow Creek, which took it through the third defense zone to a depth of about 4 km. One of the brigades of 9th Guards Tanks went on to take Steinbeck. Units of 125th Rifle Corps made repeated attempts to break into the Freienwalder Staatforst woods without success and was ordered to make use of the gains of 129th Corps to its left to bypass the woods. To the rear the 7th Guards Cavalry Corps was waiting for the infantry to produce a gap in the German lines at or near the boundary of 77th and 125th Corps.

=== Encircling Berlin ===
Overnight, the 129th Corps, with 9th Guards Tanks and now 1st Mechanized Corps, both of 2nd Guards Tank Army pushed ahead another 3 km, capturing Bisow and Leuenburg station, outflanking the defense of the woods west of Haselburg. German resistance (606th Volksgrenadier, 25th Panzergrenadier and 1st Luftwaffe Field Divisions) was effectively crushed in front of 47th Army and German remnants streamed to the west, with just a few strongpoints holding out. 47th, 3rd Shock and 5th Shock Armies were ordered on April 20 to continue a rapid advance during the day with their first echelons and through the night with their second echelons. Overall the Army advanced 12 km during the day, and the mobile troops as much as 22 km, breaking through Berlin's outer ring on a 8 km sector from Leuenberg to Tiefensee. Overnight the Army cleared Bernau in cooperation with 9th Guards Tanks. Zhukov's first priority for the next day was to preempt and German effort to organize on the inner ring. The Army responded by taking Schenow, Zepernick and Buch.

During April 21 the 47th gained 15–20 km, cut the Berlin ring road, and closed up on the city's northern outskirts. The next day the Army, still with 9th Guards Tanks, continued attacking to the west in an effort to envelop the city from the north. By 2000 hours the leading infantry began crossing the Havel River. By day's end 129th Corps was engaged along the Berlin internal defense line in and around Tegel. Only 60 km remained between the Army and 1st Ukrainian Front's 4th Guards Tank Army advancing from the south. For the next day the 47th was directed to reach the area of Spandau, then detach one division with one tank brigade from 9th Guards Tanks to drive towards Potsdam and take it, cutting the German retreat path from the city to the west. 129th Corps, still with two divisions leading, broke through several covering detachments and beat off several counterattacks, reaching a line from the south outskirts of Konradshöhe to the north bank of the Tegeler See by the end of the day, and advance of 2 km. The 143rd was fighting near Tegel station. During the day the Army had covered another 8 km to the west, crossed two corps over the Havel, and turned its front to the southwest. Overnight, Zhukov ordered the Army to complete the encirclement, in conjunction 4th Guards Tanks, by taking a line from Paren to Potsdam.

April 24 saw the 47th continuing to attack to the southwest toward Brandenburg. German forces on its right flank continued retreating to the south. 9th Guards Tanks, which had moved through the dark, managed to seize Nauen from the march at 0800. 129th Corps covered the Army's left flank with 82nd Division while the 143rd and 132nd engaged in fighting in the area south of Siedlung-Schoenwald. The objective for April 25 remained Potsdam. At noon, men of the 328th Rifle Division, with tanks of the 6th Guards Tank Brigade, joined hands with 4th Guards Tank Army's 6th Guards Mechanized Corps, completing the encirclement of Berlin. 129th Corps pushed back several covering units to the east toward the city before breaking into the north and west outskirts of Spandau, with its front facing east and south.

At this point the combined strength of the 125th and 129th Rifle Corps, with the supporting 6th Artillery Division and 74th Antiaircraft Division was 43,077 personnel, with 593 mortars, 556 guns of 76mm or larger calibre, and 123 45mm antitank guns. During April 26 the 129th Corps was involved in heavy fighting in Spandau, attacking from north to west. German resistance was desperate, with every effort made to retain its hold on the bridges over the Havel. During the day Gartenstadt was cleared and the city center was reached, as 125th Corps also exerted pressure. By day's end the west bank of the river was almost completely cleared, cutting off the Potsdam grouping from the Berlin garrison. These victories and others effectively eliminated the last chance for the forces in Berlin to break out to the west.

On April 28, 47th Army was mainly occupied with mopping up the Potsdam area before regrouping during the afternoon for an advance westward on Bützow with its main forces, consisting of 77th and 129th Corps. By the end of the day these had reached a line from Buschow to Barnewitz to Brielow after covering 20 km in road column formation. The next day 129th Corps, facing no resistance, reached a line from Lipe to Bützow. April 30 saw the Corps attacking toward Premnitz, advancing 5 km, and reaching the line Lipe–Mutzlitz–Marzahn. On May 4 the 143rd was moved to Rathenow, reaching the Elbe River near the Spanhausen Canal where it linked up with American forces. During the next two days it rounded up various refugees fleeing to the west.

== Postwar ==
The division ended the war as the 143rd Rifle, Konotop-Korosten, Order of The Red Banner, Order of Suvorov Division. (Russian: 143-я стрелковая Конотопско-Коростенская Краснознамённая ордена Суворова дивизия.) In a final round of awards on May 28 the following decorations were presented:

- 487th Rifle Regiment - Order of Suvorov, 3rd Degree
- 635th Rifle Regiment - Order of the Red Banner
- 800th Rifle Regiment - Order of Bogdan Khmelnitsky, 2nd Degree
- 209th Sapper Battalion - Order of the Red Star

These were all for their parts in the fighting for Berlin. The next day the Group of Soviet Forces in Germany was formed, under the terms of STAVKA Order No. 11095, effective June 10.

In February 1946 the 47th Army was disbanded, but 129th Corps remained in Germany. The 143rd was disbanded, along with the Corps, in early June 1946. General Zaikin was moved to deputy command of the 9th Guards Rifle Corps and would later command two Guards rifle brigades and then the 64th Guards Mechanized Division before his retirement on September 23, 1954.
