= Battle of Moscow order of battle =

The following units and commanders fought in the Battle of Moscow from October 2, 1941, to January 2, 1942.

German and Soviet commanders

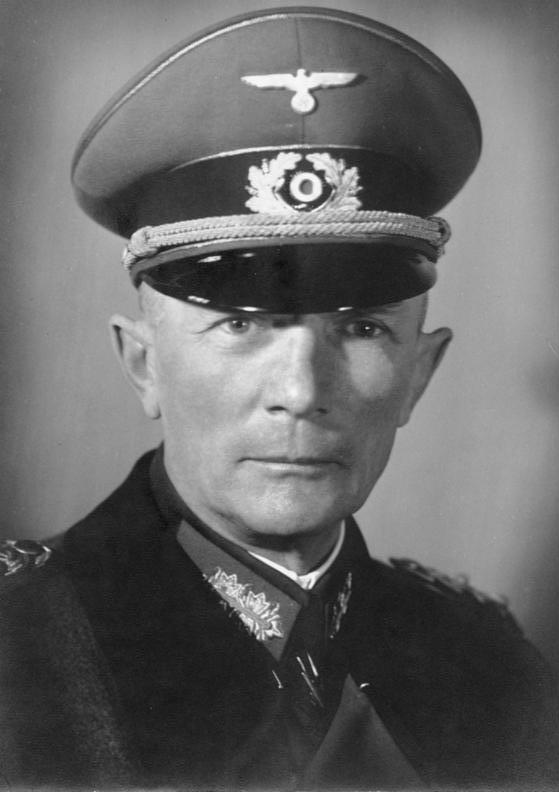
(Nazi Germany) Fedor von Bock

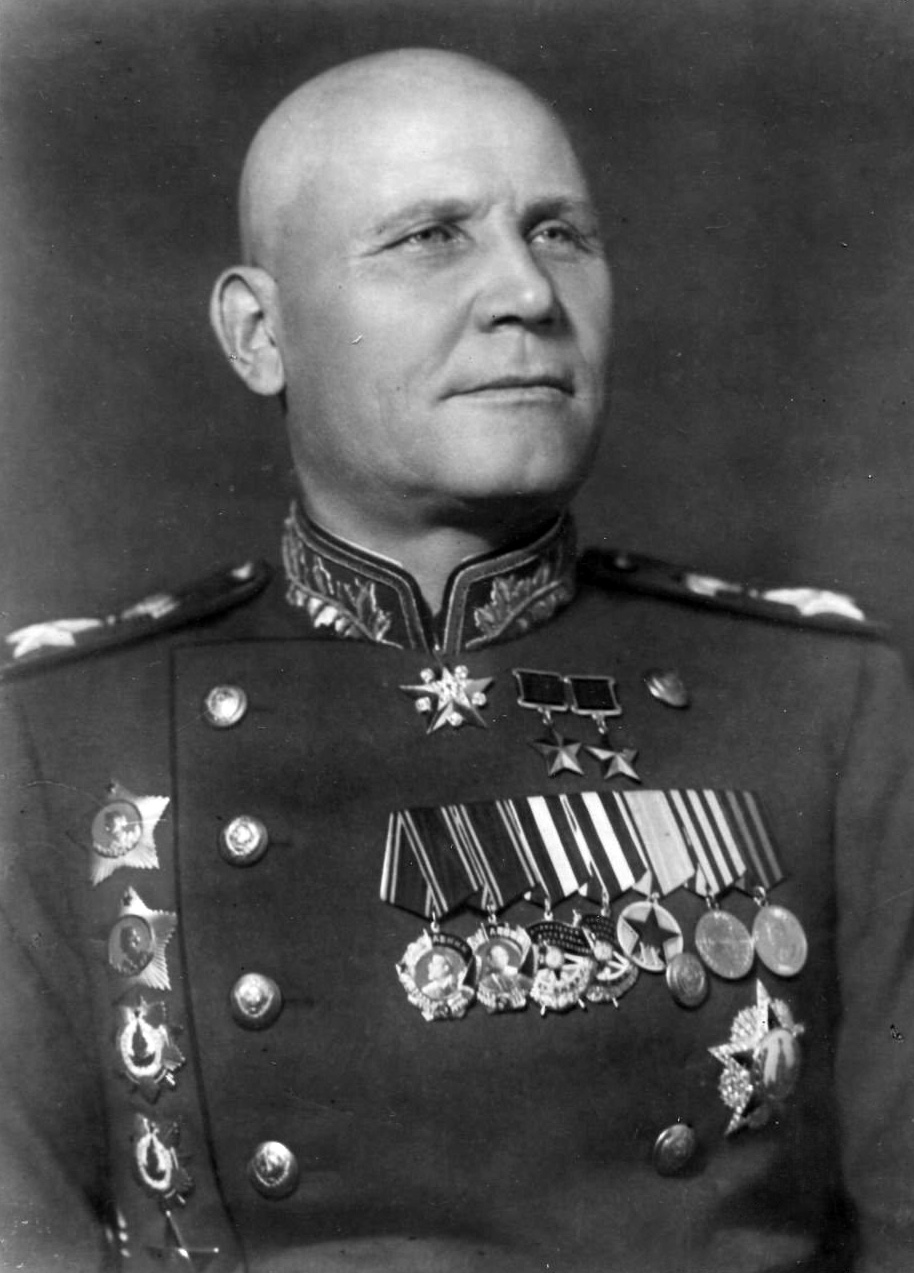
(Soviet Union) Ivan Konev

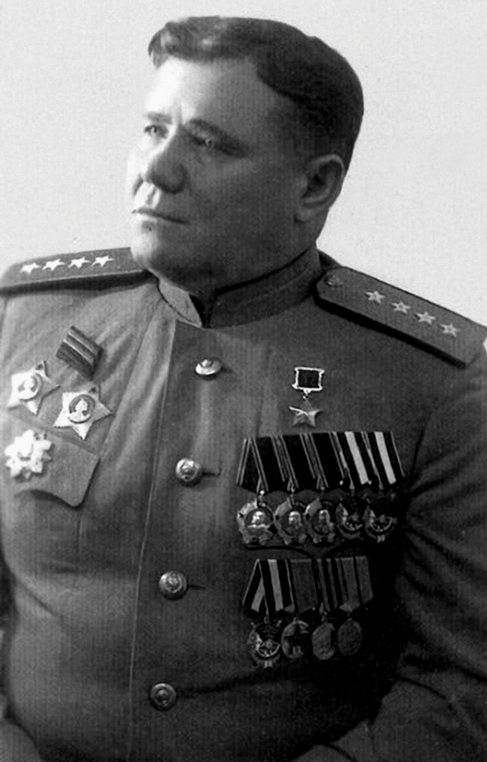
(Soviet Union) Andrey Yeryomenko

== Summary of Ground Forces ==
The six German armies made up Army Group Centre, commanded by Feldmarshal Fedor von Bock.

North of Smolensk-Moscow Highway

(Nazi Germany) German:

- Ninth Army and Panzergruppe 3

18 infantry divisions
3 panzer divisions
2 motorized infantry divisions
1 motorized brigade
1 flammpanzer battalion

(Soviet Union) Soviet – front line:

- Western Front (Konev) (Note: Made Marshal of the Soviet Union in February 1944; following war, replaced Zhukov as commander of Soviet ground forces.)

23 rifle divisions
1 mechanized division
1 tank brigade

(Soviet Union) Soviet – deployed east:

- Reserve Front (Budyonny) (Note: One of the very few Tsarist officers to retain high rank in the Red Army.)

9 rifle divisions
2 cavalry divisions

Middle Sector

(Nazi Germany) German:

- Fourth Army and Panzergruppe 4

15 infantry divisions
6 panzer divisions
2 motorized infantry divisions

(Soviet Union) Soviet – front line:

- Western Front (cont.)

13 rifle divisions
2 cavalry divisions
2 mechanized divisions
4 tank brigades

- Reserve Front (cont.)

4 rifle divisions
1 cavalry division
1 mechanized division
4 tank brigades

(Soviet Union) Soviet – deployed east:

- Reserve Front (cont.)

10 rifle divisions

Bryansk and Points South

(Nazi Germany) German:

- Second Army and Panzergruppe 2

14 infantry divisions
5 panzer divisions
4 motorized infantry divisions
1 cavalry division

(Soviet Union) Soviet – front line:

- Bryansk Front (Yeryomenko)

26 rifle divisions
1 tank division
3 cavalry divisions
4 tank brigades

(Soviet Union) Soviet – deployed east:

- none

== Detail of Ground Forces ==
The six German armies made up Army Group Centre, commanded by Feldmarshal Fedor von Bock.

=== North of Smolensk-Moscow Highway ===
Armies deployed north to south

German:

(Nazi Germany) Ninth Army
Colonel General Adolf Strauss

VIII Corps

8th Infantry Division
28th Infantry Division
87th Infantry Division

XXIII Corps

102nd Infantry Division
206th Infantry Division
251st Infantry Division
256th Infantry Division

XXVII Corps

86th Infantry Division
162nd Infantry Division
255th Infantry Division

Army Reserve

161st Infantry Division

(Nazi Germany) Third Panzer Group
Colonel General Georg-Hans Reinhardt (Note: Served 17 years for war crimes.)

XLI Panzer Corps

1st Panzer Division
101st Panzer Battalion (Flamm Panzer)
6th Infantry Division
36th Motorized Infantry Division

LVI Motorized Corps

6th Panzer Division
7th Panzer Division
14th Motorized Infantry Division
129th Infantry Division

V Corps

5th Infantry Division
35th Infantry Division
106th Infantry Division

VI Corps

26th Infantry Division
110th Infantry Division

Army Reserve

900th Lehr (Motorized) Brigade

Soviet – front line:

(Soviet Union) Western Front
Lieutenant General Ivan Konev (Note: Made Marshal of the Soviet Union in February 1944; following war, replaced Zhukov as commander of Soviet ground forces.)

22nd Army
Maj. Gen. Vasily Yushkevich

126th Rifle Division
133rd Rifle Division
174th Rifle Division
179th Rifle Division
186th Rifle Division
256th Rifle Division
16th Guards mortar battery M-13

29th Army
Lt. Gen. Ivan Maslennikov

178th Rifle Division
243rd Rifle Division
246th Rifle Division
252nd Rifle Division

30th Army
Maj. Gen. Vasily Khomenko

162nd Rifle Division
242nd Rifle Division
250th Rifle Division
251st Rifle Division
107th Mechanized Division
30th Guards mortar battery M-13

19th Army
Lt. Gen. Mikhail Lukin

50th Rifle Division
89th Rifle Division
91st Rifle Division
166th Rifle Division
244th Rifle Division
1/10th Guards mortar regiment M-13
19th Guards mortar battery M-13

16th Army
Lt. Gen. Konstantin Rokossovsky

38th Rifle Division
108th Rifle Division
112th Rifle Division
8th Guards Rifle Division
127th Tank Brigade

Soviet – deployed east:

(Soviet Union) Reserve Front
Marshal Semyon Budyonny (Note: One of the very few Tsarist officers to retain high rank in the Red Army.)

31st Army
Maj. Gen. Vasily Dalmatov

5th Rifle Division
110th Rifle Division
119th Rifle Division
247th Rifle Division
249th Rifle Division
unnumbered Guards mortar battery

49th Army
Lt. Gen. Ivan Zakharkin

194th Rifle Division
220th Rifle Division
248th Rifle Division
303rd Rifle Division
29th Cavalry Division
31st Cavalry Division

=== Middle Sector ===
Armies deployed north to south

German:

(Nazi Germany) Fourth Army
Field Marshal Günther von Kluge (Note: Committed suicide after being suspected in the 20 July Plot.)
VII Corps

7th Infantry Division
23rd Infantry Division
197th Infantry Division
267th Infantry Division

IX Corps

137th Infantry Division
183rd Infantry Division
263rd Infantry Division
292nd Infantry Division

XX Corps

15th Infantry Division
78th Infantry Division
268th Infantry Division

(Nazi Germany) Fourth Panzer Group
Colonel General Erich Hoepner (Note: Executed after being implicated in the 20 July Plot.)

XII Corps

34th Infantry Division
98th Infantry Division

XL Motorized Corps

2nd Panzer Division
10th Panzer Division
258th Infantry Division

XLVI Motorized Corps

5th Panzer Division
11th Panzer Division
252nd Infantry Division

LVII Panzer Corps

SS Motorized Infantry Division Das Reich
3rd Motorized Infantry Division
19th Panzer Division
20th Panzer Division

Soviet – front line:

(Soviet Union) Western Front (cont.)

20th Army
Lt. Gen. Filipp Yershakov

73rd Rifle Division
129th Rifle Division
144th Rifle Division
229th Rifle Division

24th Army
(from Reserve Front)
Maj. Gen. Konstantin Rakutin

19th Rifle Division
103rd Mechanized Division
106th Mechanized Division
139th Rifle Division
160th Rifle Division
170th Rifle Division
309th Rifle Division
144th Tank Brigade
146th Tank Brigade
Other armoured formations:

138th Tank Battalion
139th Tank Battalion
unnumbered Guards mortar battalion M-13

43rd Army
(from Reserve Front)
Maj. Gen. Pyotr Sobennikov

53rd Rifle Division
149th Rifle Division
211th Rifle Division
222nd Rifle Division
145th Tank Brigade
148th Tank Brigade
42nd Guards mortar battalion M-13

Dovator's Cavalry Group
Maj. Gen. Lev Dovator (Note: Killed in action 19 Sep during Zhukov's counteroffensive.)

40th Cavalry Division
53rd Cavalry Division

Front Reserves
Lt. Gen. Ivan Boldin

5th Guards Rifle Division
134th Rifle Division
214th Rifle Division
152nd Rifle Division
101st Mechanized Division
126th Tank Brigade
128th Tank Brigade
143rd Tank Brigade
147th Tank Brigade
45th Cavalry Division
2/10th Guards mortar regiment M-13

Soviet – deployed east:

(Soviet Union) Reserve Front (cont.)

32nd Army
Maj. Gen. Sergey Vishnevsky

2nd Rifle Division
8th Rifle Division
18th Rifle Division
29th Rifle Division
140th Rifle Division

33rd Army
Kombrig Dmitry Onuprienko

17th Rifle Division
60th Rifle Division
113th Rifle Division
139th Rifle Division
173rd Rifle Division

=== South of Kirov ===
Armies deployed north to south

German:

(Nazi Germany) Second Army
Colonel General Baron Maximilian von Weichs

XIII Corps

17th Infantry Division
260th Infantry Division

XLIII Corps

52nd Infantry Division
131st Infantry Division

LIII Corps

31st Infantry Division
56th Infantry Division
167th Infantry Division

Army Reserve

112th Infantry Division

(Nazi Germany) Second Panzer Group
Colonel General Heinz Guderian (Note: Relieved by Hitler 25 Dec 1941; replaced by Rudolf Schmidt.)

XXIV Panzer Corps

3rd Panzer Division
4th Panzer Division
10th Motorized Infantry Division

XLVII Panzer Corps

17th Panzer Division
18th Panzer Division
29th Motorized Infantry Division

XLVIII Panzer Corps

9th Panzer Division
16th Motorized Infantry Division
25th Motorized Infantry Division

XXXIV Corps

45th Infantry Division
134th Infantry Division

XXXV Corps

1st Cavalry Division
95th Infantry Division
262nd Infantry Division
293rd Infantry Division
296th Infantry Division

Soviet – front line:

(Soviet Union) Bryansk Front
Lt. Gen. Andrey Yeryomenko

50th Army
Lt. Gen. Mikhail Petrov

217th Rifle Division
258th Rifle Division
260th Rifle Division
278th Rifle Division
279th Rifle Division
290th Rifle Division
299th Rifle Division
108th Tank Division

3rd Army
Maj. Gen. Yakov Kreizer

137th Rifle Division
148th Rifle Division
269th Rifle Division
280th Rifle Division
282nd Rifle Division
4th Cavalry Division
Other units:

855th Rifle Regiment, 278th Rifle Division

13th Army
Maj. Gen. Avksenty Gorodnyansky

6th Rifle Division
121st Rifle Division
132nd Rifle Division
143rd Rifle Division
155th Rifle Division
298th Rifle Division
307th Rifle Division
55th Cavalry Division
141st Tank Brigade

Operational Group Ermakov
Lt. Gen. Arkady Yermakov

2nd Guards Rifle Division
160th Rifle Division
283rd Rifle Division
21st Mountain Cavalry Division
121st Tank Brigade
150th Tank Brigade
1st Guards mortar regiment M-13
6th Guards mortar regiment M-8

Front Reserves

7th Guards Rifle Division
154th Rifle Division
287th Rifle Division
42nd Tank Brigade

Soviet – deployed east:

(Soviet Union) none

== Sources ==
- Forczyk, Robert. Moscow 1941: Hitler's first defeat. Oxford, United Kingdom: Osprey Publishing, 2006. ISBN 184603017X.
- Mitcham, Samuel W. German Order of Battle, volume 1: 1st – 290th Infantry Division in WWII. Mechanicsburg, Pennsylvania: Stackpole Books, 2007. ISBN 0811734382.
- Mitcham, Samuel W. German Order of Battle, volume 2: 291st – 999th Infantry Divisions, Named Infantry Divisions, and Special Divisions in WWII. Mechanicsburg, Pennsylvania: Stackpole Books, 2007. ISBN 0811734374.
- Mitcham, Samuel W. German Order of Battle, volume 3: Panzer, Panzer Grenadier, and Waffen SS Divisions in WWII. Mechanicsburg, Pennsylvania: Stackpole Books, 2007. ISBN 978-0-8117-3438-7.
- Zetterling, Niklas & Frankson, Aners. "The Drive on Moscow, 1941." Philadelphia, Pennsylvania: Casemate Books, 2012.
