= Dmitry Safonov =

Dmitry Potapovich Safonov
- Safonov in 1940
- Born: 22 September 1895; Tsaritsyn, Saratov Governorate, Russian Empire
- Died: 26 June 1941 (aged 45) near Baranovichi, Byelorussian SSR, Soviet Union (now Belarus)
- Allegiance: Russian Empire; Russian SFSR; Soviet Union
- Branch: Imperial Russian Army; Red Army
- Service years: 1915–1917; 1918–1941
- Rank: Major general
- Commands: 143rd Rifle Division
- Conflicts: World War I; Russian Civil War; World War II
- Awards: Order of the Patriotic War, 1st class; Jubilee Medal "XX Years of the Workers' and Peasants' Red Army"

Dmitry Potapovich Safonov (Russian: Дмитрий Потапович Сафонов; 22 September 1895 – 26 June 1941) was a Red Army major general.

He served in World War I and the Russian Civil War as an artilleryman, and rose to command artillery regiments in the 1930s. Despite this background, he was given command of the 143rd Rifle Division and led it in the opening days of the war in Belarus after Operation Barbarossa began. Safonov was killed four days into the war in an attempt to escape from encirclement.

== Early life, World War I, and Russian Civil War ==
Safonov was born on 22 September 1895 in Tsaritsyn and completed primary school. He was mobilized into the Imperial Russian Army on 15 May 1915 during World War I and sent to a reserve artillery battalion in Tiflis as a private. In December of that year he was sent to the Caucasus Front, where he served with the 3rd Caucasian Artillery Battalion as a gunner and observer. The battalion was withdrawn to Prokhladny in September 1917, and a month later Safonov left to return to Tsaritsyn as the army disintegrated following the Russian Revolution.

During the Russian Civil War, Safonov joined the Red Guards on 8 December and was at the headquarters of the defense of Tsaritsyn, serving as assistant head of the artillery supply department and instructor for the formation of artillery units. In October 1918 he joined the Red Army and became a staff officer for errands with the artillery inspector of the 10th Army, and in early 1919 he was sent to the special purpose heavy artillery group of the army in Don Host Oblast. Near Yablochny he replaced his battery commander and was wounded, but remained in battle.

In May he was sent to Kamyshin, where the 96th Light Artillery Battalion of the 32nd Rifle Division. With the latter, he fought at Kamyshin and retreated to Saratov with the 10th Army. Subsequently, the battalion and the division fought in battles in the Don Host Oblast in the area of Ust-Medveditskaya, Kavkazskaya, Velikoknyazheskaya, and then in the Transcaucasus at Baku and Aghdam. After studying at the Baku Artillery Courses between September and December 1920, Safonov became a battery commander in the 28th Rifle Division. With the latter, he fought in the suppression of an anti-Soviet revolt in the area of Lankaran and Astara on the Iranian border. From June 1921 he served as an assistant battery commander in the 79th Light Artillery Battalion.

== Interwar period ==
After the end of the war, Safonov served as a battery commander in the 27th Artillery Battalion of the 27th Rifle Division in Saratov from July 1922. The division was relocated to Belarus and based at Karachev, Dorogobuzh, and Vitebsk. With the division, he served as assistant chief of the school of instruction, as a battery commander in the howitzer battalion, and as acting commander of the 27th Light Artillery Battalion. In August 1924 Safonov transferred to the 5th Artillery Regiment of the 5th Rifle Division in Polotsk, serving as a light artillery battalion commander and acting assistant commander of the regiment for supply. He became assistant commander for supply of the 4th Corps Artillery Regiment in October 1926 and completed the Courses of Improvement for Artillery Command Personnel (KUKS) at Detskoye Selo between November 1928 and June 1929.

Safonov became commander and commissar of the 16th Corps Artillery Regiment in Belarus in November 1930, and transferred to command the 23rd Corps Artillery Regiment in July 1937. He completed the Artillery KUKS again in 1938 and in August 1939 became chief of the artillery of the 24th Rifle Corps, being promoted to kombrig on 31 December. Appointed commander of the 143rd Rifle Division in May 1940, he studied at the Courses of Improvement for Higher Officers at the Frunze Military Academy between November 1940 and May 1941. Safonov became a major general on 4 June 1940 when the Red Army introduced general officer ranks.

== World War II ==
After Operation Barbarossa began, Safonov led the division as part of the reserve 47th Rifle Corps in the Battle of Białystok–Minsk. In the opening days of the war, the division and its corps were sent forward to take up defensive positions in the area of Slonim and Baranovichi. Suffering heavy losses, Safonov's division was encircled in the Minsk Pocket with the remnants of the 3rd, 4th, and 10th Armies. He was killed in a breakout attempt near Baranovichi on 26 June. The exact place of his burial is unknown.

In 1965, Safonov was among the generals killed in 1941 who were posthumously awarded the Order of the Patriotic War, 1st class in commemoration of the 20th anniversary of the end of the war.
