= Operational Group Ermakov =

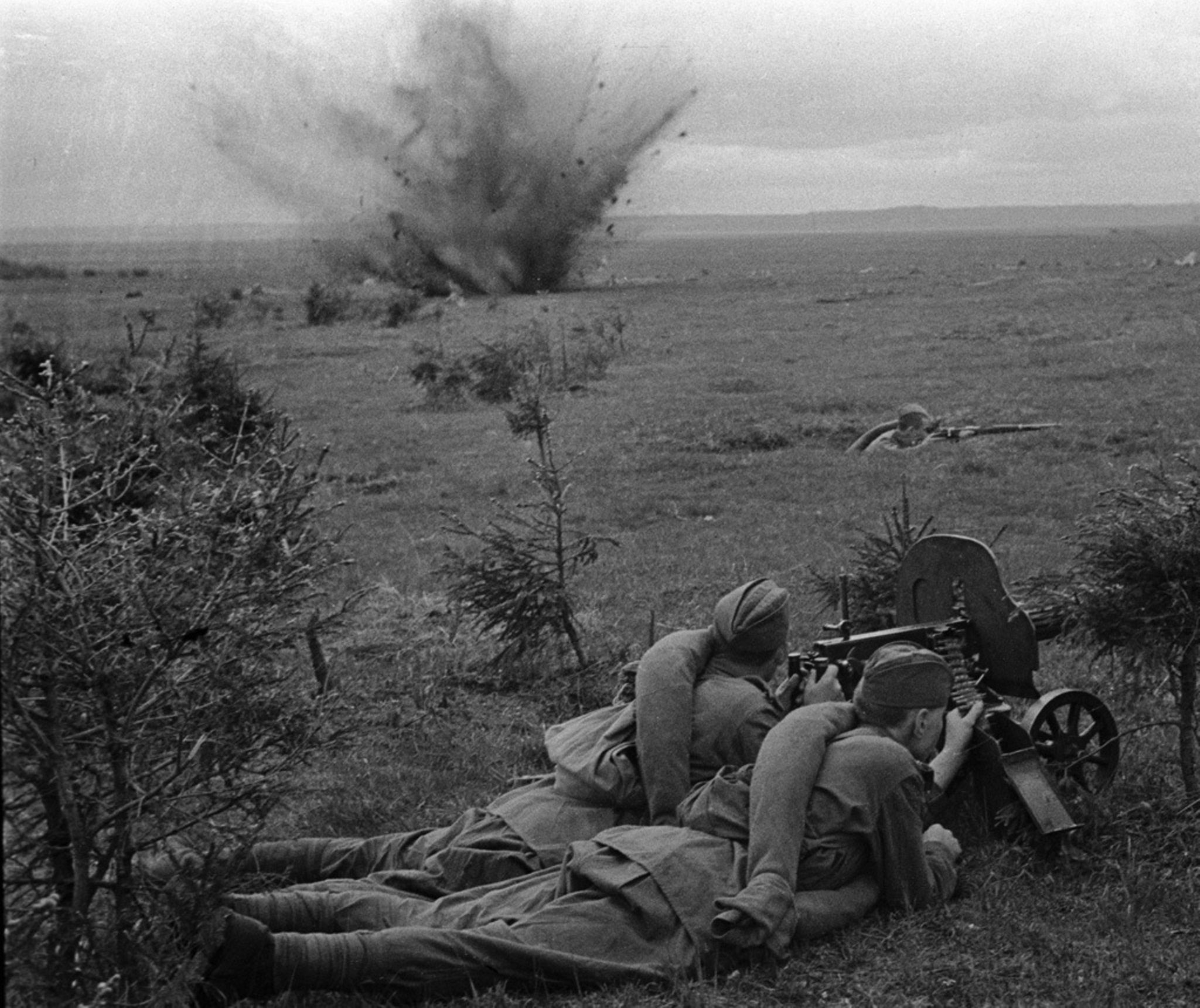
- 20th Army soldiers fighting as part of Operational Group Ermakov south of Dorogobuzh, 1 September 1941
- Country: Soviet Union
- Branch: Red Army
- Type: Combined arms
- Size: Field army
- Engagements: World War II: Battle of Moscow

Commanders
- Notable commanders: Arkady Yermakov

The Operational Group Ermakov was a grouping of three Field Armies of the Red Army, the 3rd, 13th, and 50th Armies. It fought during the Battle of Moscow on the Bryansk Front on the Eastern Front during World War II. It was named after its commander, then Major General Arkady Yermakov. Ermakov's command was controversial for his focus on offensive operations from mid August to late September 1941. Marshal Yeryomenko credited his command's actions for significantly weakening the strength of the German Attack Groupings. Conversely, General Sanalov criticized him for paying insufficient attention to the defense during this time, leading to later losses. It was disbanded.

== Order of Battle ==
- 3rd Army
- 13th Army
- 50th Army

== Commanders ==
- Major General A.N. Ermakov
