= Medal "For the Liberation of Prague" =

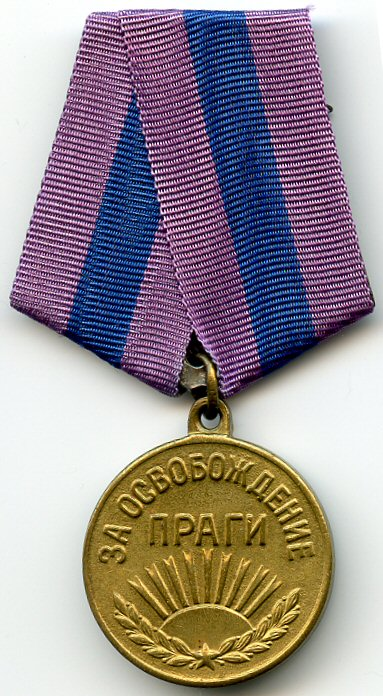
- Medal "For the Liberation of Prague" (obverse)
- Type: Campaign medal
- Awarded for: Participation in the liberation of Prague
- Presented by: USSR
- Eligibility: Citizens of the Soviet Union
- Status: No longer awarded
- Established: June 9, 1945

Highlights
- Total: ~395,000
- Ribbon of the Medal "For the Liberation of Prague"

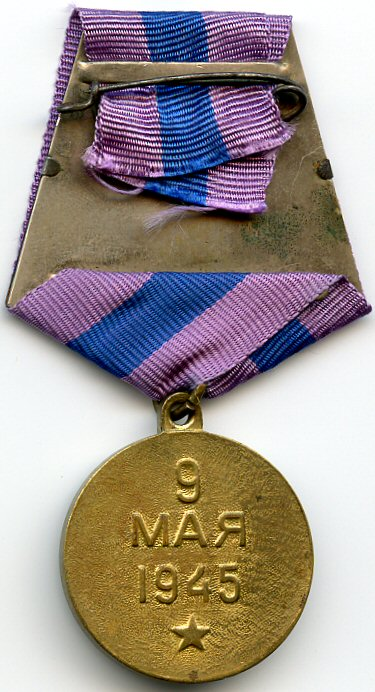
Reverse of the Medal "For the Liberation of Prague"

The Medal "For the Liberation of Prague" (Russian: Медаль «За освобождение Праги») was a World War II campaign medal of the Soviet Union established on June 9, 1945 by decree of the Presidium of the Supreme Soviet of the USSR to satisfy the petition of the People's Commissariat for Defence of the Soviet Union to adequately reward the participants of the battles for the liberation of the city of Prague from the armed forces of Nazi Germany.

== Medal Statute ==
The Medal "For the Liberation of Prague" was awarded to soldiers of the Red Army, Navy, and troops of the NKVD, direct participants of the heroic assault and liberation of the city of Prague as well as to the organizers and leaders of combat operations in the capture of this city.

Award of the medal was made on behalf of the Presidium of the Supreme Soviet of the USSR on the basis of documents attesting to actual participation in the liberation of Prague. Serving military personnel received the medal from their unit commander, retirees from military service received the medal from a regional, municipal or district military commissioner in the recipient's community.

The Medal "For the Liberation of Prague" was worn on the left side of the chest and in the presence of other awards of the USSR, was located immediately after the Medal "For the Liberation of Warsaw". If worn in the presence of Orders or medals of the Russian Federation, the latter have precedence.

== Medal Description ==
The Medal "For the Liberation of Prague" was a 32mm in diameter circular brass medal with a raised rim on the obverse. On its obverse along the upper half of the medal's circumference, the relief inscription "FOR THE LIBERATION OF" (Russian: «ЗА ОСВОБОЖДЕНИЕ»), beneath the inscription, in prominent letters, the relief inscription "PRAGUE" (Russian: «ПРАГИ»). At the bottom, a small relief five pointed star over a laurel wreath, over the wreath, a rising sun casting divergent rays upwards. On the reverse the relief date in three rows "9 MAY 1945" (Russian: «9 МАЯ 1945») over a relief plain five pointed star.

The Medal "For the Liberation of Prague" was secured by a ring through the medal suspension loop to a standard Soviet pentagonal mount covered by a 24mm wide purple silk moiré ribbon with an 8mm wide blue central stripe.

== Recipients (partial list) ==
The individuals below were all recipients of the Medal "For the Liberation of Prague".

- Marshal of Aviation Alexander Ivanovich Pokryshkin
- Marshal of the Soviet Union Ivan Ignatyevich Yakubovsky
- Czechoslovak General Ludvík Svoboda
- Marshal of the Soviet Union Ivan Stepanovich Konev
- Army General Ivan Yefimovich Petrov
- Marshal of the Soviet Union Pavel Fyodorovich Batitsky
- Marshal of the Soviet Union Semyon Konstantinovich Kurkotkin
- Colonel General Pavel Alekseyevich Kurochkin
- Colonel General Leonid Mikhaylovich Sandalov
- Colonel General Aleksandr Ilich Rodimtsev

== See also ==
- Awards and decorations of the Soviet Union
- Prague Offensive
- Prague
