= Yablochny, Volgograd Oblast =

Yablochny Яблочный
- Khutor
- Location within Volgograd Oblast Location within Russia
- Coordinates: 49°17′N 43°56′E
- Country: Russia
- Region: Volgograd Oblast
- District: Ilovlinsky District
- Time zone: UTC+4:00

Yablochny (Russian: Яблочный) is a rural locality (a khutor) in Avilovskoye Rural Settlement, Ilovlinsky District, Volgograd Oblast, Russia. The population was 5 as of 2010.

== Geography ==
Yablochny is located in steppe, on the Volga Upland, 10 km southwest of Ilovlya (the district's administrative centre) by road. Ilovlya is the nearest rural locality.
