= 283rd Rifle Division =

- Active: 1941–1946
- Country: Soviet Union
- Branch: Red Army
- Type: Rifle division
- Engagements: World War II
- Decorations: Order of the Red Banner; Order of Suvorov 2nd class
- Battle honours: Gomel

Commanders
- Notable commanders: Alexander Nechayev

The 283rd Rifle Division (Russian: 283-я стрелковая дивизия) was an infantry division of the Soviet Union's Red Army during World War II. Formed in the summer of 1941, the division fought in the Battle of Moscow, the Battle of Kursk, the Battle of Smolensk and the Battle of Berlin. The 283rd was disbanded in 1946, after the end of the war.

== History ==
The 283rd began forming from reservists on 15 July 1941 at Shchigry in the Orel Military District. Its basic order of battle included the 856th, 858th, and 860th Rifle Regiments, as well as the 848th Artillery Regiment. In early September, it was sent to the front, where it was assigned to Arkady Yermakov's operational group of the Bryansk Front. In October, during Operation Typhoon, the German assault on Moscow, the 283rd was transferred to the 3rd Army, with which it served during the rest of the war with only one small interruption. After the Bryansk Front was disbanded, the division became part of the Southwestern Front in late 1941. In February 1942, the 848th Artillery Regiment became the 9th Guards Artillery Regiment. The division was later transferred back to the new formation of the Bryansk Front, with which it served until October 1943. In late 1943, the 283rd fought in the operations that forced the German Army Group Centre to retreat back to the Dnieper.

In February 1944, the division briefly transferred to the 1st Belorussian Front's 50th Army, but a month later it returned to the 3rd Army. At this point the division had suffered so much attrition that each rifle battalion had only two rifle companies, one machine gun company, and one mortar company. The division fought in Operation Bagration in June and July as part of the 80th Rifle Corps. In late July the 3rd Army moved to the 2nd Belorussian Front, advancing into the Baltic states. The 3rd Army became part of the 3rd Belorussian Front in February 1945. In late April, the 3rd Army became part of the 1st Belorussian Front, and the 283rd was assigned to the 41st Rifle Corps, serving as the front reserve in the Berlin Offensive.

Postwar, the division was relocated to Stowbtsy in the Minsk (later Belorussian) Military District, where the 41st Rifle Corps became part of the 28th Army. The division disbanded between 1 July 1946 and 1 January 1947.
