= Arkady Yermakov =

Soviet Army lieutenant general (1899–1957)

Arkady Nikolayevich Yermakov
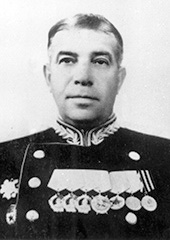
- Born: 22 September 1899; Mtsensk, Oryol Governorate, Russian Empire
- Died: 25 October 1957 (aged 58) Moscow, Soviet Union
- Allegiance: Russian SFSR; Soviet Union
- Branch: Soviet Army
- Service years: 1918–1957
- Rank: Lieutenant-General
- Commands: 100th Rifle Division; 2nd Rifle Corps; Operational Group Yermakov; 50th Army; 20th Army; 60th Rifle Corps; 23rd Guards Rifle Corps; 36th Guards Rifle Corps; 2nd Guards Rifle Corps
- Conflicts: Russian Civil War; World War II; Winter War; Eastern Front
- Awards: Order of Lenin (3); Order of the Red Banner (2); Order of Kutuzov, 2nd class

Arkady Nikolayevich Yermakov (Note: Russian: Аркадий Николаевич Ермаков) (22 September [O.S. 10 September] 1899 – 25 October 1957) was a Soviet Army lieutenant general.

Yermakov served as a Red Army commander during the Winter War and World War II. He served as the Senior Military Adviser to the Chinese People's Liberation Army during the Cold War.

== Winter War ==
During the Finnish Winter War, then Kombrig Yermakov commanded the Soviet 100th Rifle Division which was involved in the breakthrough of the Mannerheim Line which brought about the end of the war. He authored a report about the performance of Soviet Teletanks in that campaign.

== World War II ==
=== Battle of Moscow and the Yermakov Operational Group ===
During the Battle of Moscow, General Yermakov came to command what was known as the Yermakov Operational Group which grouped the 3rd Army, 13th Army, and 50th Army under his operational control in the Bryansk Front fighting against German Army Group Center. Ermakov's command was controversial for his focus on offensive operations from mid August to late September 1941. Marshal Yeryomenko credited his command's actions for significantly weakening the strength of the German Attack Groupings. Conversely, General Sanalov criticized him for paying insufficient attention to the defense during this time, leading to later losses.

=== Arrest, Court Martial, and Reinstatement ===
On January 29, 1942, while commander of the 50th Army, General Ermakov was arrested and court-martialed. He was later released, reinstated appointed Deputy Commander of the 20th Army later that year in June. He was to become commander of the 20th Army on March 20, 1943.

== Post-war service ==
He was Senior Military Adviser to the Chinese People's Liberation Army between 1953 and 1957, and died shortly after serving in that position.
