= Leonid Sandalov =

Leonid Mikhailovich Sandalov
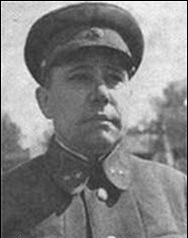
- Native name: Леонид Михайлович Сандалов
- Born: 10 April 1900; Bisiriha village, Kineshma County, Kostroma Governorate, Russian Empire
- Died: 23 October 1987 (aged 87) Moscow, Soviet Union
- Buried: Kuntsevo Cemetery
- Allegiance: Soviet Union
- Branch: Red Army
- Service years: 1919–1955
- Rank: Colonel general
- Conflicts: Russian Civil War; World War II; Invasion of Poland; Battle of Moscow; Battle of Kursk; Prague Offensive
- Awards: Order of Lenin (3); Order of the Red Banner (4); Order of Suvorov, 1st class; Order of Kutuzov, 1st class; Order of the Red Star; Order of the Patriotic War, 1st class; Order of the October Revolution

Leonid Mikhaylovich Sandalov (Russian: Леонид Михайлович Сандалов) (10 April 1900, Vichuga, Ivanovo Oblast – October 23, 1987) was a Soviet military leader with the rank of colonel-general. During World War II, he led staffs of the armies and fronts. After the war, he led the staffs of military districts, he was Deputy Chief of Staff of the Army. He received various awards for his service. A talented and prolific memoirist and military analyst. Honorary Citizen of Vichuga, Kobrin, and Riga.

== Honours and awards ==
- Three Orders of Lenin (1943,1945,1970)
- Order of the Red Banner, four times (1942, 1943, 1944, 1950)
- Order of Suvorov, 1st class (23 May 1945)
- Order of Kutuzov, 1st class (27 August 1943)
- Order of the Red Star (22 February 1941)
- Order of the Patriotic War, 1st class (1985)
- Order of the October Revolution (1980)
- Jubilee Medal "In Commemoration of the 100th Anniversary since the Birth of Vladimir Il'ich Lenin"
- Medal "For the Defence of Moscow"
- Medal "For the Victory over Germany in the Great Patriotic War 1941–1945"
- Jubilee Medal "Twenty Years of Victory in the Great Patriotic War 1941-1945"
- Jubilee Medal "Thirty Years of Victory in the Great Patriotic War 1941-1945"
- Jubilee Medal "Forty Years of Victory in the Great Patriotic War 1941-1945"
- Medal "For the Liberation of Prague"
- Jubilee Medal "XX Years of the Workers' and Peasants' Red Army"
- Jubilee Medal "30 Years of the Soviet Army and Navy"
- Jubilee Medal "40 Years of the Armed Forces of the USSR"
- Jubilee Medal "50 Years of the Armed Forces of the USSR"
- Jubilee Medal "60 Years of the Armed Forces of the USSR"
- Medal "In Commemoration of the 800th Anniversary of Moscow"
