= 192nd Rifle Division (1942 formation) =

192nd Rifle Division (March 1942 - August 25, 1942)
- Active: 1942
- Country: Soviet Union
- Branch: Red Army
- Type: Infantry
- Size: Division
- Engagements: Battle of Stalingrad

Commanders
- Notable commanders: Col. Afanasii Stepanovich Zakharchenko

The first 192nd Rifle Division was formed as an infantry division of the Red Army beginning in March 1942, in the North Caucasus Military District. Its subunits were numbered similarly to those of the 192nd Mountain Rifle Division, which had been destroyed near Uman in August 1942. It was based on the 102nd Rifle Brigade. Shortly after it began forming it was moved to the Stalingrad Military District to complete the process, and soon was assigned to the 7th Reserve Army, which became the 62nd Army on July 12. With its Army, it was deployed in the Great Bend of the Don River, west of Kalach-na-Donu, in the face of the oncoming German 6th Army. Within days of arriving at the front, part of the division was encircled, and the rest was in retreat toward the Don. In further fighting in the northeast corner of the Great Bend in mid-August the remainder of the division was encircled, and only some 1,200 troops were able to escape across the river. The 192nd had only lasted six weeks in front-line service; it was disbanded on August 25.

== Formation ==
The division began forming in March 1942 at Rostov-on-Don in the North Caucasus Military District, based on the first formation of the 102nd Rifle Brigade.

=== 102nd Rifle Brigade ===
This brigade was first formed in December 1941 in the North Caucasus Military District. Most of its personnel were volunteers from the Black Sea Fleet and from coastal installations on the northeastern coast of the Black Sea. It was briefly identified as a naval rifle brigade, but this designation was dropped after the first month it was in existence. Just about a month later, in February 1942, the brigade began to be broken up to fill up or form other units in the district, chiefly the 192nd.

The process of forming the 192nd was officially completed on July 12. Based on the rifle division shtat (table of organization and equipment) of March 18, its order of battle used many of the same numbers as that of the 192nd Mountain Division:

- 427th Rifle Regiment
- 676th Rifle Regiment
- 753rd Rifle Regiment
- 298th Artillery Regiment
- 417th Antitank Battalion
- 471st Antiaircraft Battery
- 809th Mortar Battalion
- 246th Reconnaissance Company
- 200th Sapper Battalion
- 179th Signal Battalion
- 153rd Medical/Sanitation Battalion
- 174th Chemical Defense (Anti-gas) Platoon
- 45th Motor Transport Company
- 368th Field Bakery
- 1000th Divisional Veterinary Hospital
- 1747th Field Postal Station
- 1705th Field Office of the State Bank

Shortly after it began forming, the division was moved to the Stalingrad Military District. It remained there through May, when it was assigned to 7th Reserve Army, in the Reserve of the Supreme High Command, along with the 9th and 15th Guards and the 147th Rifle Divisions. Col. Afanasii Stepanovich Zakharchenko was appointed to command on July 12, the day the division joined the active front as part of 62nd (former 7th Reserve) Army.

== Battle of Stalingrad ==
62nd Army was under command of Maj. Gen. V. Ya. Kolpakchi and consisted of six rifle divisions (196th, 192nd, 147th, 181st, 184th, and 33rd Guards). In orders from the STAVKA on July 12 it was stated, in part:

4. The mission of the Stalingrad Front is to occupy the Stalingrad line west of the Don River firmly, with 62nd and 64th Armies... and under no circumstances permit an enemy penetration east of this line toward Stalingrad.

This order set the stage for the battle in the Great Bend of the Don.

=== Fighting in the Don Bend ===
German 6th Army was ordered to continue its eastward advance as soon as possible after July 17, but this was delayed by heavy rains; it was not until the 20th that LI Army Corps' lead divisions were able to engage and defeat the forward elements of 62nd Army on the Tsutskan River. The 113th Infantry Division encountered the 1st Battalion of the 676th Rifle Regiment, supported by two battalions of the 298th Artillery and the 64th Tank Battalion, and drove it out of the village of Pronin. By late on the next day five of the Army's divisions were deployed uniformly south to north across the Great Bend of the Don from Surovikino on the Chir River to Kletskaya on the Don. The 192nd was responsible for a 42km-wide sector south of Kletskaya on the Army's right flank; its personnel strength was roughly 12,000, as compared to the shtat strength of 12,807 men. On July 22 the XIV Panzer Corps and VIII Army Corps caught up and by the evening Kolpakchi reported that his divisions were engaging German tanks and infantry all along the line. The 3rd and 60th Motorized and 16th Panzer Divisions advanced rapidly the next day, tearing through 62nd Army's forward security belt and advancing 24-40km, about halfway to the crossing points over the Don at Trekhostrovskaya and Kalach. By this time the 6th Army commander, Army Gen. F. Paulus, was planning to encircle 62nd Army west of the Don with his XIV Panzer and VIII Corps as a preliminary to an advance on Stalingrad.

Late on July 23, Kolpakchi reported that his right wing was fighting a "fierce defensive battle with enemy tanks (150-200) and infantry, supported by aircraft." Later in the evening he admitted that the 192nd was withdrawing under intense pressure, despite the best efforts of 40th Tank Brigade to counterattack. By the end of the next day the situation had worsened considerably. Kolpakchi radioed that his 192nd and 184th Divisions had withdrawn to the northeast under the impact of from up to 100 German tanks and were defending a large bridgehead south of the Don River east of Kletskaya. In fact, by this time the XIV Panzer Corps and the supporting 113th Infantry had loosely encircled a third of 62nd Army on the high ground in the Mayorovsky region, including a portion of the 192nd. The encircled grouping came under command of Col. K. A. Zhuravlev, who had flown into the pocket from 62nd Army headquarters.

Through July 25-26 the two German pincers fought hard to complete their encirclement against sharply increasing Soviet attacks. VIII Corps' 113th and 100th Jäger Divisions, supported by most of 16th Panzer's tanks, had to simultaneously contain two Soviet bridgeheads south of the Don, defeat and destroy the encircled grouping, and fend off attempts to relieve the pocket. The overall position of 6th Army became more difficult as the new 1st and 4th Tank Armies entered the fray. Early on the first day, Kolpakchi organized a counterattack force consisting of the 196th Division and the 649th Tank Battalion to attack northward along the Liska River toward Skvorin, to cut off the panzers and help rescue Group Zhuravlev. This effort was unsuccessful. While it was soon reinforced, by the end of the day the Soviet General Staff reported:

62nd Army's 192nd and 184th RDs and 40th TB, together with units of 1st Tank Army, continued intense defensive fighting along the Zakharov (17 kilometres southwest of Kletskaya), Tsimlovskii, and Maiorovskii (13-27 kilometres south of Kletskaya) line.

The remainder of 62nd Army was said to be continuing to hold their previous positions. In a further report at nightfall on July 27 the Staff stated that the two divisions and the brigade had withdrawn to a line from the northern outskirts of Svechinikovskii (23km south of Kletskaya) to Polovoi Stan (22km southwest of Kletskaya) under heavy German pressure. The situation failed to improve the next day despite the arrival of 13th Tank Corps of 1st Tank Army. On July 31 the daily summary cryptically reported, "192nd and 184th RDs withdrew to the Golubaya, Verkhne-Golubaya regions, where they are putting themselves in order."

While the main body of the division helped its Army hold a bridgehead on the west bank of the Don near Kletskaya, the encircled portion (mainly the 676th Rifle Regiment and part of the 427th), in Group Zhuralev, continued an unequal struggle between Verkhne-Buzinovka and Manoylin. Hemmed in by three infantry and one panzer division, Zhuralev had no choice but to order his forces to break out to the east. Burdened by more than 500 wounded and running out of both fuel and ammunition, on July 29 he ordered his tattered group to attack northeastward to try to link up with 22nd Tank Corps, which was supposedly advancing to the rescue. This led to a two-day running battle before the Group finally reached the lines of 4th Tank Army near Oskinskii and Verkhne-Golubaya late on July 31. By this time, Zhuralev's force had been reduced to just 5,000 men. The day before, 62nd Army had reported the overall strength of the 192nd at 8,310.

The failure of most of Group Zhuralev to escape was mostly due to the ineffectiveness of 4th Tank Army, especially its 22nd Corps. 36 of its tanks had broken down before entering battle, and the Army's commander, Maj. Gen. V. D. Kryuchyonkin, chose to keep 173rd Tank Brigade in reserve, while his 22nd Motorized Brigade and the KV tanks of 133rd Heavy Tank Brigade remained disengaged on the extreme right flank, on the far side of the Don. Late on July 31, in reaction to a perceived unwillingness of 192nd and 184th Divisions to follow his orders to the letter, Stalin directed 62nd Army to implement Order No. 227 by forming blocking detachments to prevent unauthorized withdrawals. After July 31, the 192nd, with the 184th and 22nd Tanks, continued daily attacks on the defenses of VIII Corps south of the Kremenskaya and Sirotinskaya bridgehead, but without much success.

=== Battle for Sirotinskaya ===
During the first week of August, the 192nd was reassigned to 4th Tank Army. The Army was, by now, so depleted of armor that it was derisively being referred to as the "4 Tank Army". Elements of German 6th Army reached Kalach on August 7 and inflicted a serious defeat on 62nd Army over the following days, clearing the west bank of the Don on this sector. Its obvious next target was the 50km-wide bridgehead being held by 4th Tank Army south of Kremenskaya and Sirotinskaya. By this time the Army consisted of the 18th, 205th, 184th, 192nd and 321st Rifle Divisions, the 5th Destroyer Antitank Brigade, and the 54th Fortified Region. On August 14, the 192nd was reported as having 4,965 personnel on strength.

The expected attack had begun the previous day. 6th Army concentrated 11 divisions, including one panzer and two motorized, on the 55km front. The 192nd was deployed in the Army's center just south of the 184th. The assault began with a diversionary attack by XI Army Corps against the right flank, held by the 205th, supported by the 321st and the recently arrived 343rd Rifle Division. The STAVKA intended to back 4th Tank Army with the 1st Guards Army, but this was still en route. The main attack began at 0630 hours on August 15 following a two-hour artillery preparation. With air support the XIV Panzers and VIII Corps demolished the defenses of the 192nd, 184th and 205th Divisions and pushed rapidly eastward. By day's end the 205th and 192nd were reported as having been enveloped from the flanks and fighting in encirclement in the Oskinskii region. The attack effectively split 4th Tank Army into two halves, forcing the 192nd to withdraw toward the Don north and south of Akimovskii along with the 18th and 184th.

As the situation deteriorated, parts of 1st Guards Army's 39th Guards Rifle Division were en route to the Sirotinskaya bridgehead to support Kryuchyonkin's beleaguered forces. At dawn on August 17 this division, along with 18th Rifle, 182nd Tank Brigade, and the arriving 37th Guards Rifle Division, began a counterattack northwest of Vertyachy. Despite elaborate planning this effort failed from the start and the two Guards divisions were forced over to the defensive. The 60th and 3rd Motorized Divisions pushed the remnants of the 192nd and part of the 184th back to the Don, southeast of Sirotinskaya. On the night of August 18/19, the commander of Stalingrad Front, Col. Gen. A. I. Yeryomenko, issued an over-ambitious plan which, among other aspects, called on the 192nd, along with the 184th and 18th and the two Guards divisions, to defend in place along the left bank of the Don to prevent any German crossings. However, by this time the division had been reduced to a reported strength of just 1,238 personnel. In light of this it was decided to disband the 192nd on August 25.
