= 50th Guards Rifle Division =

- Active: 1942–1957
- Country: Soviet Union
- Branch: Red Army (1942-1946); Soviet Army (1946-1957)
- Type: Division
- Role: Infantry
- Engagements: Operation Uranus; Operation Little Saturn; Operation Gallop; Donbas strategic offensive (August 1943); Nikopol–Krivoi Rog Offensive; Operation Bagration; Bobruysk Offensive; Baranovichi-Slonim Offensive; Lublin–Brest Offensive; Goldap-Gumbinnen Operation; Vistula-Oder Offensive; East Prussian Offensive; Heiligenbeil Pocket; Battle of Berlin; Prague Offensive
- Decorations: Order of the Red Banner (2); Order of Suvorov; Order of Kutuzov
- Battle honours: Stalino

Commanders
- Notable commanders: Maj. Gen. Aleksandr Ivanovich Belov; Col. Konstantin Alekseevich Sergeev; Maj. Gen. Anton Stanislavovich Vladychanskii; Col. Grigorii Leontievich Rybalka

Insignia
- Flag

The 50th Guards Rifle Division was an elite infantry division of the Red Army during World War II that continued as part of the Soviet Army during the early Cold War. The division was converted into the 50th Guards Motor Rifle Division and in the late 1950s, the division was based in Brest, Belarus. After the dissolution of the Soviet Union, the division became part of the Belarusian Ground Forces and was reduced to a brigade and then a storage base before being disbanded in 2006.

The division was first formed in November 1942 from the 2nd formation of the 124th Rifle Division, and it served in that role until after the Great Patriotic War. The division was created within the 21st Army of the Southwestern Front, but soon moved to the 5th Tank Army. It played a leading role in the defeat of the 3rd Romanian Army in Operation Uranus. It was later transferred to the 3rd Guards Army when that was formed, and was under this Army as it advanced into the Donbas in late winter. In April 1943, the division was moved again to the 51st Army in the Southern Front, where it was assigned to the 3rd Guards Rifle Corps, which it remained with for the duration of the war.

The division remained in the south of Ukraine into early 1944, in the 51st or later the 5th Shock Army, and won a battle honor, its first Order of the Red Banner, and the Order of Suvorov in the process. It was then moved to the Reserve of the Supreme High Command for rebuilding before returning to the front in May 1944 and joining the 28th Army, where it remained for the duration. The 50th Guards took part in the summer offensive in Belarus and later the abortive Gumbinnen-Goldap Operation. In January 1945, the division fought into East Prussia and assisted in the battles southwest of the city of Königsberg, winning two further decorations, including a rare second Order of the Red Banner, before the 28th Army was redeployed westward to take part in the Berlin Operation. By now, it was part of the 1st Ukrainian Front and spent the last days of the war advancing on Prague. During the summer, it was reassigned to the Belorussian Military District, and it remained in Belarus until it was reorganized as the 50th Guards Motor Rifle Division in 1957.

== Formation ==
The 50th Guards Rifle Division officially received its Guards title on November 17, just two days before the start of Operation Uranus. Its subunits would not be redesignated until December 26 and fought under their old designations through most of Uranus; following that, the division's order of battle would be as follows:

- 148th Guards Rifle Regiment (from 406th Rifle Regiment)
- 150th Guards Rifle Regiment (from 622nd Rifle Regiment)
- 152nd Guards Rifle Regiment (from 781st Rifle Regiment)
- 119th Guards Artillery Regiment (from 469th Artillery Regiment)
- 58th Guards Antitank Battalion (from 202nd Antitank Battalion)
- 66th Guards Antiaircraft Battery (until April 25, 1943)
- 54th Guards Reconnaissance Company
- 56th Guards Sapper Battalion
- 80th Guards Signal Battalion
- 59th Guards Medical/Sanitation Battalion
- 55th Guards Chemical Defense (Anti-gas) Company
- 57th Guards Motor Transport Company
- 53rd Guards Field Bakery
- 47th Guards Divisional Veterinary Hospital
- 566th Field Postal Station
- 343rd Field Office of the State Bank

Colonel Aleksandr Ivanovich Belov remained in command of the division after redesignation; he had commanded the 124th since July and would be promoted to the rank of major general on November 27. Belov's division gained its Guards status in large part due to its offensive successes in the fighting for the Serafimovich bridgehead south of the Don River against the 3rd Romanian Army. Beginning on the night of October 13/14, the division, along with the 14th Guards Rifle Division, began an intense probing attack against the Romanian forces which continued until the 16th. The intention was to draw German forces away from Stalingrad, but not incidentally, these attacks, along with another by 76th Rifle Division on October 24–27, inflicted 13,154 casualties on the 3rd Army, roughly the equivalent of what the British 8th Army would suffer in the concurrent Second Battle of El Alamein.

During earlier fighting in the bridgehead on October 3, Senior Lieutenant Mikhail Arsentyevich Kuznetsov of the 622nd Rifle Regiment had led a group of his submachine-gunners in a successful battle in the area of Senyutkino Farm against two enemy-held bunkers. On the second day of Operation Uranus, he further distinguished himself by leading his men into the rear of a retreating Romanian artillery battalion, which was soon mostly destroyed or captured, including 16 serviceable guns. Kuznetsov then directed his group to attack Sredne Tsaritsynsky Farm using the captured artillery and took it after a 15-minute fight, adding more prisoners and trophies to the total. He was personally credited with 88 killed and 64 prisoners, but also received five wounds. The journalist Ilya Ehrenburg wrote an account of this action entitled "Good morning, Guards!" On February 14, 1943, Kuznetsov was made a Hero of the Soviet Union. A month later, he was severely wounded and concussed, and he spent most of the rest of the war in political work.

== Operation Uranus ==
Shortly after redesignation, the 50th Guards was moved from the 21st Army to the 5th Tank Army, which would be the main shock group of the Southwestern Front. Before the main offensive began on November 19, all four of the army's first-echelon rifle divisions conducted a reconnaissance-in-force with reinforced rifle battalions on the night of November 17/18. Overcoming Romanian forward security outposts and eliminating obstacles as they were encountered, the division advanced nearly 2 km (1.2 mi) into the positions of the Romanian 5th Infantry Division to 250 m south of the burial mound at Marker +1.2 and Hill 222, 5 km (3.1 mi) east-northeast of Kalmykovskii. This reconnaissance was effective in uncovering and removing minefields and other engineering works and identified many strongpoints in the main defensive line, as well as weak spots.

When the actual offensive began on November 19, the division had a strength of about 8,800 personnel, of which about 6,500 were infantry and sappers. It was stationed on the left flank of the army, between the 119th Rifle Division and the 21st Army. All three rifle regiments were deployed in the first echelon in numerical order from left to right. It was supported by 74 tanks of the 216th Tank Brigade as well as the 510th Tank Battalion; the plan was to create a breach that the 26th Tank Corps could pass through.

The attack began between 0848 and 0850 hours Moscow time. During the first hour, the division overcame the Romanian first defensive positions with relative ease. The combined infantry and armor attack seized the ridge line between Kalmykovskii and Verkhne Fomikhinskii, tore a gaping hole through the defenses of 5th Romanian, and captured Hill 223 by 1100 hours, forcing the Romanian division to withdraw the remnants of its left wing to new positions to the southwest. Now the Romanian resistance became stiffer, as the 50th and 47th Guards and the 119th Divisions reached their second defensive position, while the 14th Guards was stalled even farther back. It was becoming apparent to the commander of the 5th Tank Army, Lt. Gen. P.L. Romanenko, that the artillery preparation had not been as effective as planned. Accordingly, he decided that if the offensive was to succeed, he would have to commit his 1st and 26th Tank Corps.

These corps stepped off at 1400 hours, west of the 50th Guards' sector, and effectively obliterated two regiments of the Romanian 14th Infantry Division. Meanwhile, the 216th and 19th Tank Brigades supported the division in its struggle to seize Hills 217 and 223 in a fight that lasted until 1800 hours. Thereafter, the 216th and the 406th Rifle Regiment wheeled eastward and were involved in fighting in the Tsaritsa River valley by the day's end. The remainder of the division, with 19th Tanks, advanced to positions east of Hill 208, 5–7 km (3.1–4.3 mi) southeast of Klinovoi, where it faced the remnants of the 14th Romanian's right-wing regiment, which was now supported by a handful of tanks from the 1st Romanian Armored Division.

During the first half of November 20, the 1st Tank Corps ran up against elements of the reinforcing 22nd Panzer Division. Meanwhile, the 216th and 19th Tanks supported the division and the left-wing regiment of 119th Division in containing the Romanian 5th Infantry and 1st Armored as part of an encirclement operation east of the Tsaritsa. Ultimately, the Soviet force was to link up with 21st Army's 277th and 333rd Rifle Divisions, advancing westward from Kletskaya. Continuing their assaults eastward and southeastward into the afternoon, the two rifle divisions faced near-constant counterattacks and probes from the Romanian armor and a composite regiment made up of remnants of the 6th and 13th Romanian Infantry Divisions trying in vain to find an escape route to the southwest. The 1st Armored was under orders from XXXXVIII Panzer Corps to break out and rejoin it in the Donshchinka region, but was blocked by the Soviet force, backed by a 76mm tank destroyer regiment and a flamethrower tank battalion. By now, the near-encircled Romanian forces had come under command of Gen. M. Lascăr, commander of the 6th Infantry.

When the battle resumed on November 21, the 50th Guards was facing the northwest sector of Group Lascăr's salient, still supported by 216th Tanks along and west of the Tsaritsa, while the remainder of the 26th Tank Corps began exploiting towards Kalach. The division and brigade deployed along a 12 km-wide (7.5 mi) sector west of and along the river and drove eastward against the positions of the Romanian 5th Infantry. After repelling several Romanian counterattacks during the morning, the division crossed the Tsaritsa with two regiments, penetrated the Romanian defenses, and pushed forward another 6 km (3.7 mi), roughly halfway to its objective of Golovsky. This was also the objective of the 333rd Division, and a linkup would complete the encirclement of Group Lascăr. Before this could happen, the 119th and 277th Divisions joined hands to the south and achieved the same purpose. The survivors of five infantry divisions and the 1st Armored were completely enveloped by 2000 hours. The 50th Guards continued its advance, which became critical, as Golovsky had become the hub for supply and other operations for Group Lascăr. The 6th Romanian Infantry sent a battalion of infantry and several artillery pieces to defend the town.

While the most dramatic developments on November 22 involved the 5th Tank Army's mobile forces reaching Kalach, most of the remainder of the army began the liquidation of Group Lascăr. At 0230 hours, General Romanenko sent a message by radio to the Romanian headquarters demanding an unconditional surrender, but this was refused. Beginning before dawn, the division, with the 119th Rifle and 216th Tanks, and now joined by a regiment of the 346th Rifle Division, continued to drive east. It reached the rear of the 5th Romanian's left wing and forced that division to withdraw; this left the northern third of the pocket in Soviet hands, and the 5th Romanian began to disintegrate under the pressure. Later, the division joined the tank brigade in attacking the 6th Romanian, driving it to the southeast and capturing the remainder of Verkhne Fomikhinskii and the village of Belosoin.

At this point, the remnants of the Romanian 1st Armored broke out towards the Tsaritsa; the 50th Guards and 119th Divisions ignored this in their efforts to finally seize Golovsky and Lascăr's headquarters. Despite contrary orders from the German high command, Lascăr and his subordinates created a plan to escape from the pocket, but this was disrupted by the two Soviet divisions as they continued to advance against sporadic opposition, and Golovsky fell to the 50th Guards at 2100 hours. This knocked out Group Lascăr's communications and effectively broke it into two parts, while General Lascăr himself was taken prisoner. The following day, Romanenko ordered the division, along with 216th Tanks, to disengage from the battle for the pocket and redeploy south towards the Chir River, although it would take several days to reach this objective.

=== Battle for Chernyshevskaya ===
By now, the main objective of the 5th Tank Army was the town of Rychkovsky on the Chir. The 22nd Panzer and 1st Romanian Armored had set up a bridgehead in the Bolshaya Donshchinka and Kurtlak River regions, and General Romanenko was intent on eliminating these positions. He ordered the 50th Guards, 346th and 119th Divisions with the 8th Guards and 216th Tank Brigades and the 8th Motorcycle Regiment to contend with the former, north of the Kurtlak. The attack was led on November 24 by the 346th and the mobile units at 0700 hours. The other two rifle divisions joined the fray after the 22nd Panzer had withdrawn its antitank guns from Bolshaya Donshchinka, leaving the Romanian Group Sion to fend for itself. By the end of the day, the 50th Guards had reassembled at Perelazovsky and prepared to march south to the Chir, leaving the 119th to finish off the Sion group. By this time, Romanenko was planning his measures to crack the Axis defense along that river, and the division was tentatively earmarked for the region north of Chernyshevskaya.

The following day, several advance elements of the 5th Tank Army pursued a number of objectives along the Chir, leaving only the 437th Rifle Regiment of 47th Guards Rifle Division to defend Chernyshevskaya proper and the area to its north and south. The 3rd Romanian Army quickly ordered the remnants of the 22nd Panzer and 1st Romanian Armored to counterattack and retake this town, with a force of 30 to 40 tanks and infantry mounted on up to 100 vehicles. The attack gained its goal by 1500 hours. At nightfall, Romanenko ordered the 50th Guards to accelerate its march and join with the 47th Guards and the 21st Cavalry Division to recapture Chernyshevskaya by enveloping it from the north.

After covering 20 km (12 mi), the division reached the Chir east and northwest of the town by midday on November 26. Deploying for action, it engaged the Romanian 14th Infantry north of Chistyakovskaya and the 22nd Panzer at Chernyshevskaya, recapturing it after forcing a crossing, and also seizing several nearby villages. The 622nd Rifle Regiment made the most progress, pushing 6 km (3.7 mi) west from Novosergeevka and taking Hill 188.0, 2 km (1.2 mi) northwest of Stavidnyanskii. At this time, the 21st Cavalry and a supporting regiment of the 47th Guards were only 4 km (2.5 mi) south of the latter village, and a large part of the Romanian 14th was in danger of encirclement.

To deal with this crisis, the local German commander, Gen. K.-A. Hollidt, committed all his available forces to contain the Soviet bridgeheads at and north of Chernyshevskaya, including the 610th Security Regiment, various alarm battalions, and the Romanian 7th Cavalry Division. During the afternoon of November 27, the 50th Guards was engaged with these reinforcements along with the 47th Guards, and possession of the town again changed hands. The 159th Rifle Division, facing the left wing of Romanian 14th Infantry on a quiet sector, sent part of its left-wing regiment to help the 781st Rifle Regiment repel several attacks by Romanian forces east of the village of Fomin, 18 km (11 mi) northwest of Chernyshevskaya.

The fighting in this area, and along all of the 5th Tank Army's front, remained inconclusive during the last days of the month. General Belov had two of his regiments, supported by one from the 47th Guards, battling for the town while also defending a bridgehead west of the Chir from Romanian attacks. The two Axis armored divisions were much reduced from their original strengths, but the two Guards divisions had limited, if any, tank support and neither side could overcome the other. Late on November 30, General Romanenko ordered the 21st Cavalry to turn over its sector to the 50th Guards and rejoin its 8th Cavalry Corps at Oblivskaya, but due to incessant counterattacks, it was unable to disengage until three days later. At the same time, the division also relieved a regiment of the 47th Guards.

=== Operation Little Saturn ===
In late November, the STAVKA began planning for Operation Saturn, which was to liberate Rostov and cut off the Axis forces in the Caucasus region. In preparation, the 50th Guards was transferred to the 1st Guards Army, which was to be the main shock group for this operation. While Saturn was to begin on December 10, it became apparent to the planners that the 1st Guards was too large and unwieldy to command effectively. On December 5, the new 3rd Guards Army was created, which included the 50th Guards. During this time of planning and reorganization, the division continued its sparring for positions around Chernyshevskaya. The operation, now called Little Saturn, would also include the 6th Army of the Voronezh Front, and would target the German XVII Army Corps, the weakened divisions of Romanian I Corps and the bulk of the Italian 8th Army.

The offensive began on December 16; by now, the division was part of the 14th Rifle Corps with the 14th Guards and 203rd Rifle Divisions. It broke through the positions of the Romanian 14th Infantry southeast of Krasnokutskaya, heading for Fomin. By December 27, the 5th Tank Army was beginning to attack towards the town of Tormosin, crossing the Chir and advancing 8–10 km (5.0–6.2 mi) southwestward with its the 5th Mechanized Corps and 8th Cavalry Corps, and capturing Parshin Station on the rail line 10 km (6.2 mi) southwest of Oblivskaya. This led to a counterattack by a battlegroup of the 6th Panzer Division that, over the course of the next two days, routed the 8th Cavalry. However, the 5th Mechanized had been reinforced by the 50th Guards, which together managed to hold the Station and extend their hold on the railway southwestward. By this time, the division was at about 50 percent of its authorized strength. The 5th Tank Army's offensive was stalled, and General Romanenko was relieved of his command.

== Into Ukraine ==
The 50th Guards soon returned to the direct command of 3rd Guards Army. By the beginning of February 1943, the army held a bridgehead over the Northern Donets River, south of Voroshilovgrad, from which it broke out on February 12 in a drive to liberate that city. The division took the villages of Pervozvanovkaya, Suvorovskii, and Orekhovskii on February 13 and continued to advance towards Makedonovka. Meanwhile, the 8th Cavalry Corps made a spectacular advance, reaching the eastern outskirts of Debaltsevo by nightfall, while the 14th and 50th Guards, leading the 14th Rifle Corps, were still some 60 km (37 mi) to the rear. By the morning of February 14, other units of the 3rd Guards Army, chiefly the 59th Guards and 243rd Rifle Divisions and elements of 2nd Tank Corps, had liberated Voroshilovgrad.

After this victory, the 3rd Guards and 5th Tank Armies pressed on towards Stalino, but on February 20, the German 4th and 1st Panzer Armies began the counteroffensive that would become the Third Battle of Kharkov. While this was primarily aimed at the Voronezh Front, the Southwestern Front also faced attacks, and the overall crisis made any further Soviet advance impossible. On February 28, General Belov handed his command over to Col. Konstantin Alekseevich Sergeev. Belov would go on to command the 29th Rifle Corps and the 3rd Guards Rifle Corps before he was mortally wounded on March 28, 1944, when his vehicle struck an antitank mine. He died of his injuries on April 8.

In March, the division was transferred to the 29th Rifle Corps, still in the 3rd Guards Army, but a month later, it was moved to Southern Front, where it joined the 3rd Guards Rifle Corps of 51st Army. At this time, it was noted as having 70 percent Russian and 30 percent Asian personnel. The 51st Army played a minor role in the abortive July offensive to penetrate the German defenses along the Mius River, but a larger part in the renewed offensive into the Donbas that began on August 13. During that month, the 3rd Guards Corps was transferred to the 5th Shock Army, still in the Southern Front. On September 4, Col. Anton Stanislavovich Vladychanskii took over command from Colonel Sergeev. Vladychanskii would be promoted to the rank of major general on March 19, 1944, and would lead the division for most of the rest of the war. The city of Stalino was liberated on September 8, and the division earned an honorific:

STALINO... 50th Guards Rifle Division (Colonel Vladychanskii, Anton Stanislavovich)... The troops who participated in the liberation of the Donbas region, and the city of Stalino, by the order of the Supreme High Command of 8 September 1943, and a commendation in Moscow, are given a salute of 20 artillery salvoes from 224 guns.

=== Lower Dniepr Offensive ===
During the rest of September, the Southern Front, with the 5th Shock Army on its right (north) flank, forced the German 6th Army back through the Donbas towards the southernmost part of the Panther–Wotan line from Zaporozhe to Melitopol. On October 9, the Front (renamed the 4th Ukrainian on October 20) renewed its offensive on both sides of Melitopol. The 51st Army's battle for the city lasted until October 23, after which the 6th Army was in a near rout across the Nogay Steppe. The larger part of its forces fell back to form a bridgehead east of the Dniepr, south of Nikopol, with the 5th Shock and 2nd Guards Armies in pursuit. During November, substantial German reserves were moved into the bridgehead in anticipation of an offensive to restore communications with Crimea, which had been cut off by the remainder of the 4th Ukrainian Front. This came to nothing in the face of Soviet threats elsewhere, but the bridgehead remained strongly held.

=== Nikopol-Krivoi Rog Offensive ===
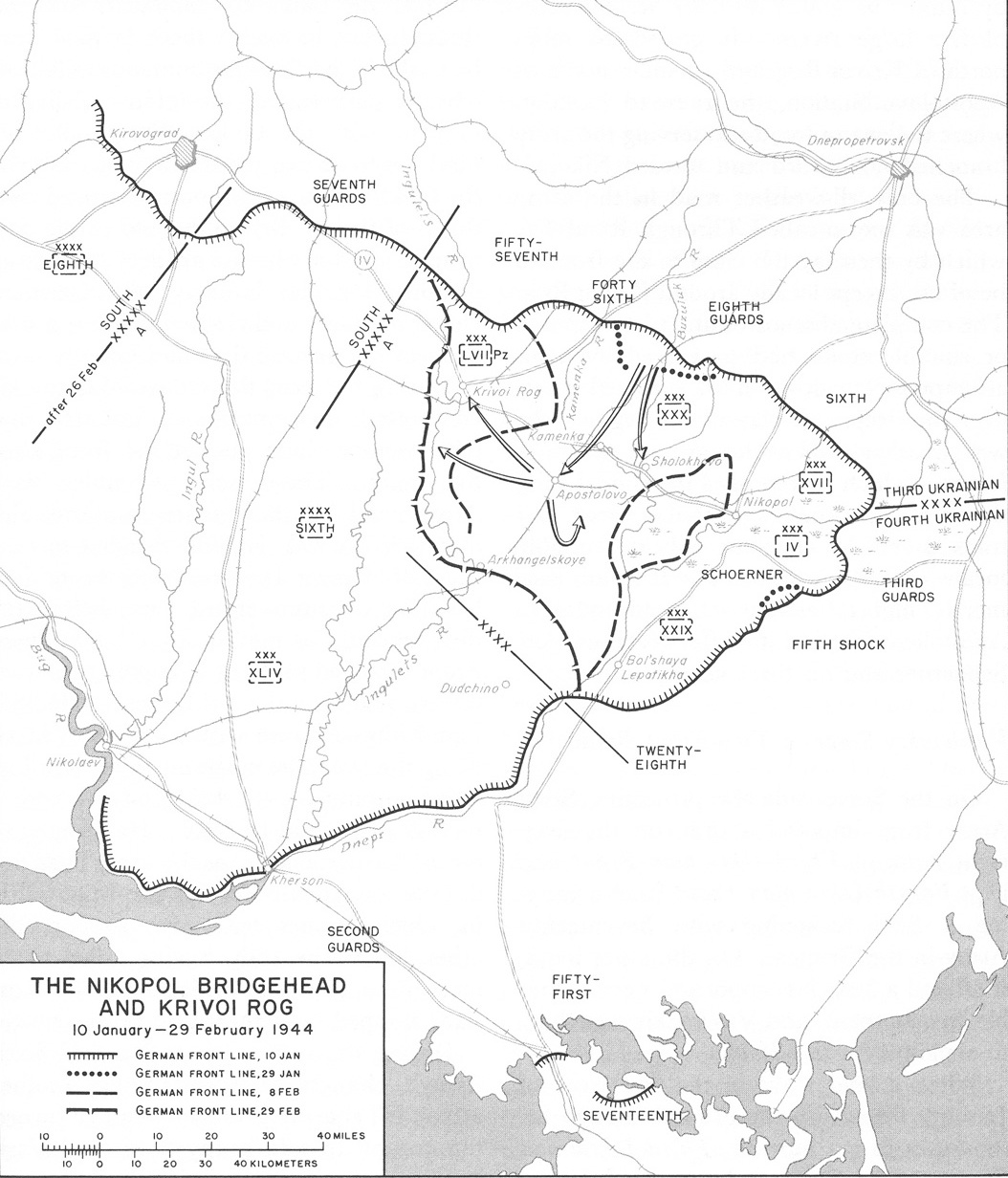
Nikopol-Krivoi Rog Offensive. Nikolayev is on the lower left.

A cold wave in the first week of January 1944 firmed up the ground enough for the 4th and 3rd Ukrainian Fronts to begin moving against the remaining German positions in the Dniepr bend. The 3rd Ukrainian began its assault on January 10, but this had largely failed by the 13th. On the same day, the 4th Ukrainian attacked the bridgehead, but made minimal gains before both Fronts called a halt on January 16. The offensive was renewed on January 30 against a bridgehead weakened by transfers, and the 4th Ukrainian drove a deep wedge into its south end. On February 4, the German 6th Army ordered the bridgehead to be evacuated. On February 13, the 50th Guards was awarded its first Order of the Red Banner for its part in the battle for the Nikopol bridgehead.

During February 5, the Shock Army was transferred to the 3rd Ukrainian Front. The battle for Krivoi Rog continued until the end of that month. On March 4, all four of the Ukrainian fronts began a new offensive into western Ukraine. By March 20, the 3rd Ukrainian had reached the Southern Bug River, and the 5th Shock Army was on the approaches to Nikolayev, which Hitler had designated as a "fortress" on March 8. Nikolayev was finally liberated on March 28, and on April 1, the division was decorated with the Order of Suvorov, 2nd Degree, for its role in the fighting. Immediately following this victory, the 3rd Guards Corps was moved to the Reserve of the Supreme High Command and assigned to the 28th Army.

== Operation Bagration ==
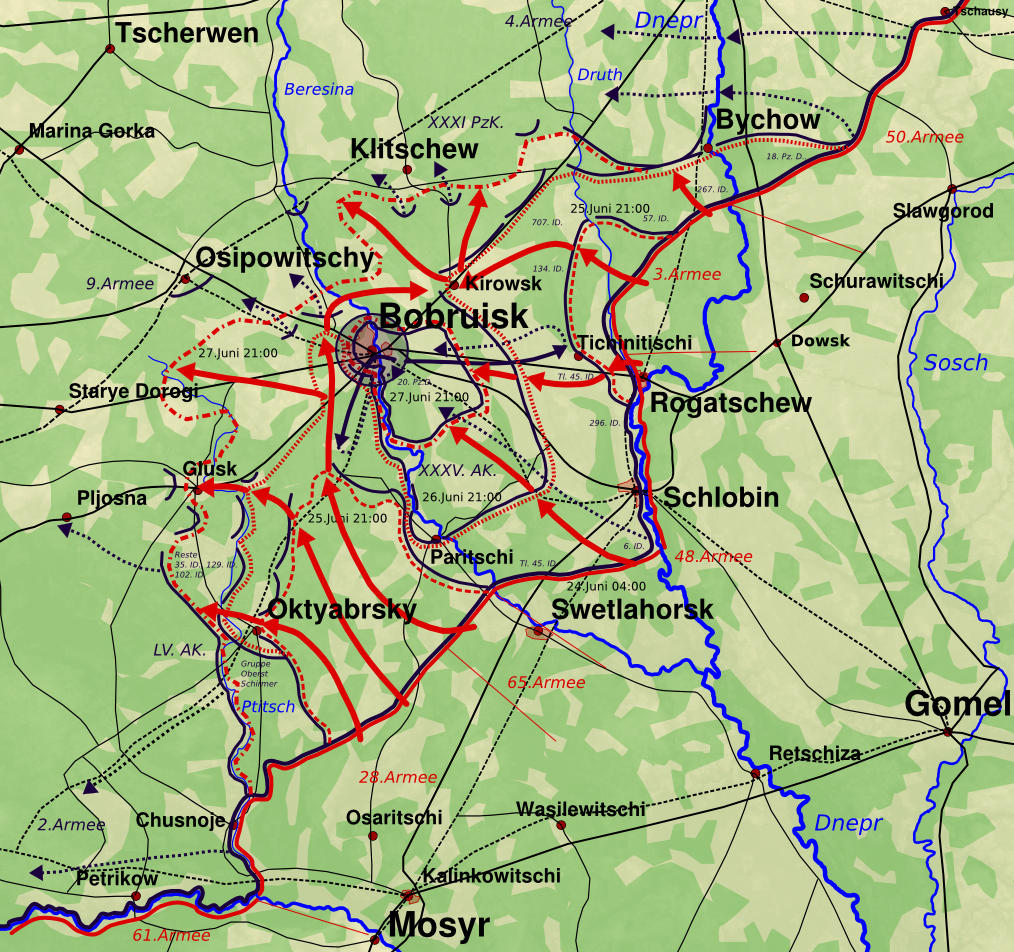
Bobryusk Offensive. Note initial position of 28th Army north of Mozyr.

At the beginning of June, the 3rd Guards Corps consisted of the 50th, 54th, and 96th Guards Rifle Divisions. When the army returned to the front, it joined the center of the 1st Belorussian Front, at the corner northwest of Mozyr, linking with the left-flank armies, which stretched along the southern margins of the Pripyat Marshes. While those armies would mostly remain inactive in the first weeks, the Front commander, Army Gen. K. K. Rokossovskii, assigned the 28th an active role in the initial phase of the summer offensive in support of the 65th Army's drive on Bobruysk. The army deployed all three of its corps in the first echelon, with the 3rd Guards Corps on a 5 km-wide (3.1 mi) sector on the right. During the first two days of the battle, the Corps drove back the southern flank of the German 35th and, together with elements of 65th Army, advanced up to 10 km (6.2 mi) on June 24, forcing the German division back towards the railroad south of Bobruysk.

On June 25, the 28th Army broke into the lines of the 35th and 129th Infantry Divisions in five places. The 129th Infantry, by now reduced to the size of a regiment, was forced to rotate to the west, leaving a gap on its corps' north flank. Meanwhile, the 18th Rifle Corps of the 65th Army was scattering the remnants of the 35th Infantry and widening the gap, which was entered by Cavalry Mechanized Group Pliev. By the evening of June 28, Pliev's 30th Cavalry Division reached the outskirts of Slutsk, as the rifle divisions of 28th Army were making their best speed to keep up with the advance of the mobile group. By June 30, German reinforcements were arriving, including elements of the 4th Panzer Division at Baranovichi, which were sent to block the road to Slutsk. From June 22 to July 3, the 28th Army and the Pliev Group had forced a German retreat of 250 km (160 mi) to the vicinity of Stolbtsy, but the advance now paused to bring up supplies to overcome the increasing resistance. On July 23, the 152nd Guards Rifle Regiment would be decorated with the Order of the Red Banner for its part in the liberation of the Minsk region.

=== Baranovichi-Slonim Operation ===
Resistance along the Baranovichi axis grew on July 4 as reinforcements continued to arrive, including the remainder of the 4th Panzer, units of 12th Panzer Division that had broken through from Minsk, and the 1st Hungarian Cavalry Division moving up from Pinsk. The 28th Army reached a line from Minkeviche to Kletsk to Rybaki. At this time, Baranovichi was garrisoned by the 52nd Special Designation Security Division, a panzer battalion, and three assault gun brigades. A defensive line was already being prepared along the Shchara River based on the town of Slonim. The Front was ordered, under STAVKA operational directive no. 220127, to immediately resume its advance on Baranovichi and subsequently to Brest with the 48th, 65th, and 28th Armies; however, the 28th was stretched out over a 25 km (16 mi) line of march and was still 12 km (7.5 mi) from its designated attack sector. The 50th Guards was reported as at roughly 85 percent of its authorized strength.

The army commander, Lt. Gen. A. A. Luchinskii, directed his forces to outflank Baranovichi from the south on July 5, and by evening had liberated Lyakhovichi. Intensive fighting for Baranovichi took place on July 6–7. The line along the Shchara was penetrated, but the army advanced only a few kilometers. By the end of the second day, the town was partially encircled, but the Soviet advance was slowed by German reinforcements and continuing difficulties in bringing the Front's forces up to the attack sectors. Overnight, the 65th Army, assisted by the 28th, stormed Baranovichi in an unexpected night attack which cleared it by 0400 hours on July 8 as the German forces withdrew to the west. By the end of the day, the army had advanced as far as Gintsevichi.

=== Lublin–Brest Offensive ===
The 28th Army continued making its main offensive in the direction of Kossovo and Smolyanitsa, and by July 13 had reached the Yaselda River along its entire front. At this point, it encountered much stiffer resistance from the newly arrived 102nd Infantry Division and the 5th Hungarian Reserve Division. It fell to the 1st Mechanized Corps to pierce this line and allow the advance to continue. By July 16, the 3rd Guards Corps, in conjunction with the 105th Rifle Corps of the 65th Army, had reached a line from Abramy to Chakhets, along with the Pliev Group.

The operation to liberate Brest began on July 17. The Front's main attack would be made by its left-flank armies, with the right-flank forces in support; the 28th Army on the right with the 61st Army and the Pliev Group were to outflank the city from the north and northwest, encircle it, and capture it. The attack began with a 15-20 minute artillery preparation. The 28th Army, with the Pliev Group, directed their advances towards Kamenets, and by the end of the day had covered 25 km (16 mi). After beating off numerous German counterattacks the next day, the army forced the Lesnaya River east of Dmitrovichi and linked up with the 61st Army.

From July 19, the German High Command began heavy counterattacks against the army and the Pliev Group in order to continue its hold on Brest, and these would continue until the 21st. The commitment of the 20th Rifle Corps from second echelon in the direction of the railroad to Brest along the army's left flank during the second half of July 20 allowed the offensive to gain momentum and the German forces began to withdraw towards the city. During July 25–26, the army forced the Lesnaya north of Czernawczyci, and General Rokossovskii handed over his reserve 46th Rifle Corps to help complete the encirclement. This was done on July 27, and beginning after midnight on the 28th, the army drove into the fortified zone from the north, throwing off counterattacks, and linked up with the 9th Guards Rifle Corps of the 61st Army and the main forces of the 70th Army.

== Into Germany ==
Following the massive push of the summer offensive, the Soviet armies remained largely inactive over the following months. On August 30, Col. Grigorii Leontievich Rybalka took command of the division and remained in this position until General Vladychanskii returned on November 25. In September, the 28th Army returned to the Reserve of the Supreme High Command for rest and rebuilding, and in October was reassigned to the 3rd Belorussian Front on the East Prussian border. It was almost immediately involved in the abortive Goldap-Gumbinnen Operation, which largely ended on its sector by October 30. In recognition for its efforts in this offensive, the 50th Guards received its second Order of the Red Banner on November 14, while the 119th Guards Artillery Regiment was decorated with the Order of Suvorov, 3rd Degree; this regiment had previously been awarded the Order of the Red Banner.

=== East Prussian Offensive ===
In the planning for the Vistula-Oder Offensive in January 1945, the Front organized its shock group into two echelons with the 39th, 5th, and 28th Armies in the first, backed by the 11th Guards Army and two tank corps. The 28th Army had its main forces on its right flank and was to launch a vigorous attack north of the Stallupönen - Gumbinnen paved highway in the general direction of Insterburg. Its breakthrough frontage was 7 km (4.3 mi) wide and its immediate objective was to destroy the Gumbinnen group of German forces in conjunction with 5th Army, before assisting 11th Guards in its deployment along the Inster River. The army deployed a total of 1,527 guns and mortars on this frontage, and the 3rd Guards Corps, which was to launch the main attack, was backed by 205 such weapons per kilometer.

The 3rd Belorussian Front began its part of the offensive on the morning of January 13. The army, mainly facing the 549th Volksgrenadier Division, broke through the defense along the Kischen - Grunhaus sector and penetrated as much as 7 km (4.3 mi) by the day's end while fighting off 14 counterattacks by infantry and tanks. The next day, the 3rd Guards Corps advanced only 1–1.5 km (0.62–0.93 mi) during a day-long fight for the strongpoint of Kattenau; a number of positions changed hands several times. January 16 saw further small progress, as the German forces continued to cover the routes to Gumbinnen. By now, it was apparent to the Front commander, Army Gen. I. D. Chernyakhovskii, that the breakthrough would not come on this sector, and he moved his second echelon to the 39th Army's front.

On January 19, the army began to advance more successfully. General Luchinsky concentrated the maximum amount of artillery fire in support of the 3rd Guards and 128th Rifle Corps, allowing a breakthrough on a narrow sector towards the northeastern outskirts of Gumbinnen. Meanwhile, the 20th Rifle Corps reached the town from the south, but the German grouping continued to resist, and the army's units were forced to consolidate. During a two-day battle on January 20–21, the 20th and 128th Corps finally captured Gumbinnen, but a large remnant of the German forces managed to retreat to the Angerapp River, which the 28th Army reached by the end of the second day. By 2300 hours on January 23, it became apparent that the German forces facing the army were in retreat to the west. Over the next two days, the army advanced up to 35 km (22 mi) and reached a line from Kortmedin to Gerdauen by the end of the 26th, less than 70 km (43 mi) southeast of Königsberg.

On February 19, the 150th Guards Rifle Regiment would be awarded the Order of the Red Banner for its role in the initial phases of the offensive in East Prussia. After six weeks of almost continuous fighting, by the beginning of March, the divisions of the 3rd Belorussian Front were seriously understrength; the 50th Guards at this time contained roughly 2,500 personnel. Despite this, the Front ordered a new operation to eliminate the remaining German forces southwest of the Königsberg fortified zone. The new offensive began on March 13, with the 28th Army attacking in the direction of Bladiau, which was taken on March 15. During the night of March 25/26, the army, in cooperation with the 31st Army, stormed the town of Rosenberg and advanced towards Balga, capturing 6,200 soldiers, 25 tanks, and 220 guns of various calibres. Immediately after the operation ended on March 29, the 28th was reassigned to the Reserve of the Supreme High Command and began moving across eastern Germany towards the Oder River. On April 26, the division would be decorated with the Order of Kutuzov, 2nd Degree, in recognition of its role in the fighting southwest of Königsberg.

=== Battle of Berlin ===
By mid-April, the 50th Guards had arrived in the 1st Ukrainian Front. The battle for the Oder and Neisse Rivers began on April 16, but the 28th Army's leading divisions did not arrive at the front and begin combat operations until April 22. On April 26, the division was moving to the area of Zossen, which contained the underground headquarters of the German OKW and OKH, and reached Baruth. By this point, the German 9th Army had been encircled and was making every effort to break out. Led by 50 tanks, the advance force of this grouping attacked west along the boundary between the 120th Rifle Corps' 329th Rifle Division and the 58th Rifle Division of 3rd Guards Army in the Halbe area. While the 395th Rifle Division halted the breakthrough, the 50th and 96th Guards Rifle Divisions were diverted to eliminate the German forces. The two Guards divisions threw the breakthrough force back to the woods northeast of Baruth, while a further attack by the 25th Tank Corps in conjunction with the 389th Rifle Division cut it off from the main body of 9th Army.

The next day, General Luchinsky received orders to occupy a line from Dornswalde to Radeland to Jauchzen-Bruck with three divisions, including the 50th Guards. While the German 9th Army continued its efforts to escape from its pocket, its former breakthrough force was gradually eliminated, sometimes in hand-to-hand fighting. 6,200 prisoners were taken, along with 47 tanks, 25 armored transports, 180 guns and mortars, and 1,133 motor vehicles. By the end of the day, the 9th Army pocket had shrunk to just 400 sq km. Overnight on April 28/29, this Army organized one more effort to escape towards the positions of the 12th Army in the Luckenwalde area. The breakout began at 0100 hours and made progress at the junction of the 3rd and 3rd Guards Armies. In the morning, the 3rd Guards Corps was brought up to halt the breakthrough. A combined force of 45,000 men punched a hole 2 km (1.2 mi) wide between the 50th and 54th Guards in the Munchendorf area and began moving through in spite of powerful artillery and mortar fire. This breakthrough was eventually halted by forces of the 3rd Guards Tank, 4th Guards Tank, and 13th Armies.

During April 29, the 50th and 96th Guards Divisions repulsed several heavy German attacks, and by the end of the day were continuing to fight along a line from Dornswalde to Radeland to Munchendorf, with their fronts facing north. The 50th Guards, on a line from outside Radeland to an unnamed height 3 km (1.9 mi) northeast of Munchendorf, was forced to pull back its left flank towards the latter village under pressure, but managed to consolidate its position there alongside the 395th Division. Most of the remainder of German 9th Army was in the Staatsforst Kummersdorf and took heavy losses from flanking fire of the division as they moved through the gap they had created near Munchendorf. Despite these losses, the survivors of 9th Army pushed about 24 km (15 mi) farther west. This advance succeeded in cutting the communications of the 3rd and 4th Guards Tank and 28th Armies.

Overnight, the command of the 1st Ukrainian Front took steps to finally eliminate this group of German forces, which were already broken into at least three pockets. Luchinsky ordered two regiments of the 61st Rifle Division to be moved by trucks to the Sperenberg area to reinforce the 71st Mechanized Brigade. At the same time, the 3rd Guards Corps was ordered to make concentric attacks from the north and south to defeat the German forces in the breakthrough area, while the 3rd Guards Army attacked from the east. Despite enormous losses, the 9th Army continued its attempts to break out on April 30. The 50th Guards remained in heavy fighting near Munchendorf, while the 71st Mechanised and elements of the 117th Guards Rifle Division were forced aside; later in the day, the 117th Guards brought that portion of the breakout force to a halt. By the end of the day, the 3rd Guards Corps was still encountering stubborn resistance while mopping up the encircled forces in their sector. By the end of the day, although elements of 9th Army advanced another 10 km (6.2 mi) to the west, the tail of the army was mostly eliminated and mass surrenders began; the 1st Ukrainian Front alone took 24,000 prisoners. On May 1, units of the 28th Army eliminated the last remnants in the Staatsforst Kummersdorf woods as part of the German grouping. The Front command now gave orders to prepare for a new offensive in the direction of Prague.

During the first week of May, the division advanced with the rest of its Front towards Prague, but saw little combat before the fighting ended on May 11. By this time, the men and women of the division shared the complete title of 50th Guards Rifle, Stalino, twice Order of the Red Banner, Order of Suvorov and Kutuzov Division. [Russian: 50-я гвардейская стрелковая Сталинская дважды Краснознамённая, орденов Суворова и Кутузова дивизия.] On June 4, the 152nd Guards Rifle Regiment was decorated with the Order of Alexander Nevsky for its part in the fighting southeast of Berlin.

== Postwar ==
In August, the division was redeployed to Slutsk, and in 1946 to Brest, both of which it had helped to liberate in 1944. It remained part of the 28th Army in the Belorussian Military District, briefly transferring to the reformed 3rd Army in 1946, but returning to the 28th after the army disbanded in 1947. During this period, the rest of the 3rd Guards Rifle Corps was disbanded, and the division became part of the 128th Rifle Corps. The 69th Guards Tank Regiment joined the 50th Guards from the disbanded 11th Mechanized Division in early 1947. With the 12th Guards Mechanized Division, the division participated in the 1954 Totskoye nuclear exercise as part of the 128th Rifle Corps (renumbered as the 42nd in 1955). By a directive of May 20, 1957, the 50th Guards Rifle Division was reorganized into the 50th Guards Motor Rifle Division, and the 148th, 150th, and 152nd Guards Rifle Regiments became motor rifle regiments but retained their previous numbers. The corps headquarters was disbanded at the same time, and the division came under the direct control of the 28th Army.

The division was reduced to the 50th Separate Mechanized Brigade in 1994, and then the 50th Weapons and Equipment Storage Base in 2001. The storage base had a strength of 277 military personnel and was disbanded in 2006. Its personnel were transferred to other military units.

By 2005, the 50th Weapons and Equipment Storage Base was formed again in Baranovichi from the 28th Base. It became a reduced brigade (50th Separate Mechanized Brigade) in 2007, but was disbanded in 2011.
