= Novotsaritsynsky =

Novotsaritsynsky Новоцарицынский
- Khutor
- Location within Volgograd Oblast Location within Russia
- Coordinates: 49°11′N 42°34′E
- Country: Russia
- Region: Volgograd Oblast
- District: Kletsky District
- Time zone: UTC+4:00

Novotsaritsynsky (Russian: Новоцарицынский) is a rural locality (a khutor) in Verkhnecherenskoye Rural Settlement, Kletsky District, Volgograd Oblast, Russia. The population was 337 as of 2010. There are 13 streets.

== Geography ==
Novotsaritsynsky is located 44 km southwest of Kletskaya (the district's administrative centre) by road. Verkhnecherensky is the nearest rural locality.
