= Kurganny =

Kurganny Курганный
- Khutor
- Location within Volgograd Oblast Location within Russia
- Coordinates: 48°59′N 42°38′E
- Country: Russia
- Region: Volgograd Oblast
- District: Kletsky District
- Time zone: UTC+4:00

Kurganny (Russian: Курганный) is a rural locality (a khutor) in Kalmykovskoye Rural Settlement, Kletsky District, Volgograd Oblast, Russia. The population was 73 as of 2010. There are 2 streets.

== Geography ==
Kurganny is located in steppe, 51 km southwest of Kletskaya (the district's administrative centre) by road. Kalmykovsky is the nearest rural locality.
