= Verkhnyaya Buzinovka =

Verkhnyaya Buzinovka Верхняя Бузиновка
- Khutor
- Location within Volgograd Oblast Location within Russia
- Coordinates: 49°03′N 43°12′E
- Country: Russia
- Region: Volgograd Oblast
- District: Kletsky District
- Time zone: UTC+4:00

Verkhnyaya Buzinovka (Russian: Верхняя Бузиновка) is a rural locality (a khutor) and the administrative center of Verkhnebuzinovskoye Rural Settlement, Kletsky District, Volgograd Oblast, Russia. The population was 900 as of 2010. There are 7 streets.

== Geography ==
Verkhnyaya Buzinovka is located in steppe on the right bank of the Liska River, 41 km southeast of Kletskaya (the district's administrative centre) by road. Nizhnyaya Buzinovka is the nearest rural locality.
