= 41st Guards Rifle Division =

41st Guards Rifle Division (August 6, 1942 – October 1945)
- Active: 1942–1945
- Country: Soviet Union
- Branch: Red Army
- Type: Division
- Role: Infantry
- Engagements: World War II; Battle of Stalingrad; Operation Little Saturn; Operation Gallop; Third Battle of Kharkov; Belgorod-Kharkov Offensive Operation; Battle of the Dnieper; Kirovograd Offensive; Battle of Korsun–Cherkassy; Uman–Botoșani Offensive; First Jassy–Kishinev Offensive; Second Jassy–Kishinev Offensive; Budapest Offensive; Operation Spring Awakening; Vienna Offensive
- Decorations: Order of Suvorov
- Battle honours: Korsun; Danube

Commanders
- Notable commanders: Maj. Gen. Nikolai Petrovich Ivanov; Col. Andronik Sarkisovich Sarkisyan; Maj. Gen. Konstantin Nikolaevich Tsvetkov; Lt. Col. Aleksandr Filippovich Belyaev

The 41st Guards Rifle Division was formed as an elite infantry division of the Red Army in August 1942, based on the 1st formation of the 10th Airborne Corps, and served in that role until after the end of the Great Patriotic War. It was the last of a series of ten Guards rifle divisions formed from airborne corps during the spring and summer of 1942. It was briefly assigned to the 1st Guards Army in Stalingrad Front, then to the 24th Army in Don Front, and suffered heavy casualties north of Stalingrad before being withdrawn to the Reserve of the Supreme High Command for a substantial rebuilding. Returning to 1st Guards Army in Southwestern Front in November it took part in Operation Little Saturn as part of 4th Guards Rifle Corps and then advanced into the Donbas where it was caught up in the German counteroffensive in the spring of 1943. During the summer and fall the division fought its way through eastern Ukraine as part of the 6th, and later the 57th Army under several corps commands. It would remain in the southern part of the front for the duration of the war. By February 1944 it was in the 7th Guards Army and took part in the battle for the Korsun Pocket, winning its first battle honor in the process. Shortly after it was transferred to the 4th Guards Army, where it would remain for the duration, still moving through several corps headquarters. The 41st Guards saw limited service in the first Jassy-Kishinev offensive in the spring, but considerably more in August's second offensive and several of its subunits received battle honors or decorations. The division itself won a second honorific during the offensive into Hungary in January 1945 and was later decorated for its role in the capture of Budapest. After the fall of Vienna in April it did garrison duty in the city for a short time before being directed west into lower Austria where it linked up with U.S. forces in the last days of the war. In October, while still in Austria, it was converted to the 18th Guards Mechanized Division.

== Formation ==
The 10th Airborne Corps had been formed for the first time in September 1941 in the Volga Military District but did not officially finish forming its brigades and headquarters until December 5 after which it was moved to the Moscow Military District. The STAVKA employed the Corps to conduct air assault operations west of Moscow during its winter counteroffensive and it suffered heavy losses in the process. Airborne corps were roughly divisional-sized units made up of three brigades of about 3,000 men each. Since they were considered elite light infantry the STAVKA decided they could be assigned Guards status upon reformation. The artillery regiment and many of the other subunits had to be formed from scratch. From March to July 1942 the Corps was engaged in rebuilding and training in the Moscow area before being redesignated as the 41st Guards on August 6 and departing for the front 48 hours later. After the subunits received their designations the division's order of battle was as follows:

- 122nd Guards Rifle Regiment (from 23rd Airborne Brigade)
- 124th Guards Rifle Regiment (from 24th Airborne Brigade)
- 126th Guards Rifle Regiment (from 25th Airborne Brigade)
- 89th Guards Artillery Regiment
- 44th Guards Antitank Battalion
- 52nd Guards Antiaircraft Battery (until April 20, 1943)
- 37th Guards Reconnaissance Company
- 44th Guards Sapper Battalion
- 174th Guards Signal Battalion (later 55th Guards Signal Company)
- 45th Guards Medical/Sanitation Battalion
- 43rd Guards Chemical Defense (Anti-gas) Company
- 38th Guards Motor Transport Company
- 40th Guards Field Bakery
- 34th Guards Divisional Veterinary Hospital
- 2144th Field Postal Station
- 570th Field Office of the State Bank

Col. Nikolai Petrovich Ivanov, who had led 10th Airborne since the previous year, remained in command of the unit when it was redesignated. He would be promoted to the rank of major general on January 19, 1943. On the morning of August 4 the STAVKA had issued a directive to split the existing Stalingrad Front in two: a truncated Stalingrad and a new Southeastern Front. The latter was to contain the newly created 1st Guards Army which was formed from the last five of the airborne-derived Guards divisions. A further order late the next day directed these divisions with supporting artillery to proceed to the Stalingrad area by rail post haste.

== Battle of Stalingrad ==
By mid-month it was becoming apparent that the German 6th Army would soon be in a position to launch a general advance on the city by way of Kalach. In planning his defense the commander of Southeastern Front, Col. Gen. A. I. Yeryomenko, directed 1st Guards Army:

... after deploying forward to Ilovlinskaia Station [near Ilovlia] must concentrate 39th Guards Rifle Division in the Trekhostrovskaia region by the morning of 14 August and, by day's end, each of three rifle divisions in the Khokhlachev, Perekopskaia and Perekopka, and Novo-Grigorevskaia regions...

On the night of August 18/19 Yeryomenko issued new orders for multiple counterattacks by his forces to tie down 6th Army, including the 41st, 38th and 40th Guards Rifle Division to attack from the Kremenskaia and Shokhin line southwards. Due to Yeryomenko's underestimate of the strength of 6th Army (his order required the three divisions to attack a German force almost twice their combined size), the short time available to prepare, and the lack of artillery, armor and air support the counterattack had no chance to succeed, although some territory was gained. Despite this, by holding the Kremenskaia and Sirotinskaia bridgeheads south of the Don the 1st Guards Army helped set the stage for important developments later in the campaign. The counterattacks ended on August 22 and on the 31st the 1st Guards handed over the bridgeheads and the three divisions to the 21st Army.

=== Kotluban Offensives ===
41st Guards Rifle Division ammunition carrier Bambe Kikidzhiyev delivers mortar rounds, September 1942

The order reassigning the 41st and 38th Guards to 21st Army was quickly rescinded and both returned to 1st Guards Army by September 3. The Army was now under command of Stalingrad Front and during these days it moved east from Kletskaia across the Don to Sadki, 25 km northeast of Kotluban.The forces of 6th Army that had reached Stalingrad in late August were still reliant on a narrow corridor from the Don to the Volga for supplies and the new Deputy Supreme Commander, Army Gen. G. K. Zhukov, was determined to sever the corridor and link up with 62nd Army to the south. Maj. Gen. K. S. Moskalenko, the 1st Guards commander, had received orders from Zhukov on August 30 to begin the offensive on September 2, but found this impossible to achieve. Among other issues, the 41st and 38th Guards (plus the supporting 7th Tank Corps) had to make a redeployment march of up to 200 km. In the end, due to fuel shortages the attack had to be postponed until 0500 hours on September 3. The Army faced the 3rd and 60th Motorized Divisions of XIV Panzer Corps on its attack sector east of Kuzmichi.

The 4th Tank Army had attacked the corridor farther west on September 2, a move that was intended to support Moskalenko's assault but which failed miserably. 1st Guards Army struck at 0530 hours after a weak and ineffective artillery preparation; the 41st and 38th Guards, still moving up, were in second echelon with the 84th Rifle Division. Attacking across flat and treeless terrain in the face of well-prepared German positions the Soviet tanks and riflemen penetrated as much as 4 km deep and cut the width of the corridor in half before becoming bogged down among German strongpoints after suffering significant losses. By 1700 hours the division had concentrated in Sukhaya Karkagon Balka - Hill 132.9 - Hill 126.0 region. The 38th Guards and 84th Divisions were committed to the offensive the next day, but the 41st remained in reserve. It went into action when the offensive was renewed on September 5 and by 1500 hours was fighting along the northwestern slopes of Hill 143.6 and the southeastern slopes of Hill 145.1. By now it was clear that the offensive, which had been joined by the new 24th and 66th Armies, had stalled, although under pressure from Stalin Zhukov persisted until September 13.

Over the next few days a major regrouping took place among the Soviet forces and the division came under the command of 66th Army to the east. When the second Kotluban offensive began on September 18 it formed a shock group with the 38th Guards and 116th Rifle Divisions on a roughly 8 km sector on the Army's right wing west of the Sukhaia Mechetka River and north of Hill 139.7. This force of about 18,000 men and a few infantry support tanks faced two regiments from the 3rd and 60th Motorized, about 5,000 men backed by 30-40 tanks. The outcome was not much in doubt:

66th Army went over to the offensive at 0800 hours on 18 September with the units on its right wing but, after encountering strong enemy resistance, was unable to advance.

During the fighting over this day and the next the Army had no success whatsoever at a cost of about 20,000 casualties. Given the initial strength of the shock group this was a devastating blow to all three divisions. In preparation for a third offensive, which began on September 23, the remnants of the 41st Guards were shifted west to 24th Army but that Army was also stymied by German resistance from the outset and lost 6,305 men up to September 26. On October 11 the division was withdrawn to the 4th Reserve Army in the Reserve of the Supreme High Command, where it was assigned to the 4th Guards Rifle Corps.

== Operation Little Saturn ==
As part of the planning for a strategic counteroffensive against the German forces at Stalingrad, on October 22 the STAVKA ordered that the Southwestern Front be re-formed by October 31, north of the Don and in the bridgeheads south of it. The next day it further ordered the formation of a new 1st Guards Army, based on 4th Reserve, to form up 150–190 km north of Serafimovich and be combat ready by November 10 under the command of Maj. Gen. I. M. Chistyakov. At this time 4th Guards Corps contained the 41st and 35th Guards and the 195th Rifle Divisions. On November 1 the Army took up the positions of the 63rd Army along the Don and took over command of its three divisions.

Operation Uranus had successfully encircled the 6th Army and part of 4th Panzer Army in the Stalingrad area by late on November 22. By now the STAVKA was planning its follow-on offensive, tentatively named Operation Saturn, with the goal of liberating Rostov and trapping all the Axis forces in the Caucasus region. On the 28th an operational group under command of Lt. Gen. V. I. Kuznetsov was formed on the 1st Guards Army's right (west) wing consisting of the 4th and 6th Guards Rifle Corps, 18th Tank Corps, 22nd Motorized Rifle Brigade and supporting artillery. Its principal mission was to form the right pincer of the planned operation that was to envelop and destroy the Italian 8th Army.

In the event the German attempt to relieve the forces at Stalingrad, Operation Winter Storm, forced the redeployment of 2nd Guards Army to Don Front and the STAVKA began planning the less-ambitious Little Saturn for the 1st and 3rd Guards, 5th Shock and part of 6th Army. Since 3rd Guards had been created from the left wing of 1st Guards Army, the latter was now fully under command of General Kuznetsov and its shock group consisted of the two Guards rifle corps with three tank corps, supported by a rifle and a tank corps from 6th Army. Together this force was to attack across the Don from the Verkhny Mamon region, again with the aim of penetrating the Italian defenses. The offensive began on December 16, facing the 5th Infantry Division Cosseria and the 3rd Infantry Division Ravenna plus one German security regiment. During the first 24 hours the Italian divisions did a creditable job of confining the attackers to penetrations of little more than 3 km; fog hindered the observation of the supporting Soviet artillery. The 41st and 44th Guards Divisions, which were in the first echelon of their respective corps, encountered especially powerful resistance. Overnight the 6th and 1st Guards Armies regrouped their divisions and brought their armor into direct support of the infantry. The combined-arms approach quickly brought about a complete rout of the Axis forces throughout the main attack sectors and the 17th Tank Corps broke through at the boundary between Cosseria and Ravenna late in the afternoon. By the end of December 18 most of Italian 8th Army was either fleeing in disorder or encircled in towns or pockets throughout the countryside which would soon be mopped up by the advancing infantry.

By December 24 the Soviet mobile forces had exploited almost 200 km into the rear of German Army Group B. Beginning on December 28 and continuing the next day the 4th Guards Corps' 195th Rifle Division attacked the 3rd Battalion of the 19th Panzer Division's 73rd Panzergrenadier Regiment in Bondarevka, while the 35th and 41st Guards besieged the town of Chertkovo, a communications center held by German and Italian troops. Over the next ten days the Corps continued to battle for these positions as the advance on the west side of 1st Guards Army's penetration became a tentative stalemate. The Army laid siege to Chertkovo, Millerovo, and other strongpoints and also held off advances by Army Detachment Fretter-Pico to relieve those places.

=== Into the Donbas ===
Southwestern Front returned to the offensive on January 30, 1943 at 0850 hours following an artillery onslaught. Axis forces put up stubborn resistance but were pushed back along all sectors and advanced 15km along the main axis. 1st Guards Army, in cooperation with Lt. Gen. M. M. Popov's mobile group, attacked along its right flank throughout the day. Part of 41st Guards blocked Novo-Astrakhan while the remainder, along with the rest of 4th Guards Corps, captured Bunchuzhna, Peschana and Zhitlovka. As the offensive continued, on February 14 the Front commander, Col. Gen. N. F Vatutin, issued a report that stated in part:

4. The 1st Guards Army on the right flank captured Orelka and Yurevka in night fighting and throughout 13.2.1943 was consolidating along its new line, while holding Lozovaya and Barvenkovo. In the center the army, while repelling numerous counterattacks... continued fighting fiercely for Slavyansk. During the night of 12-13.2.1943 units of the 41st Guards Rifle Division abandoned Bylbasovka and fell back to its northern outskirts under pressure from numerous enemy counterattacks.

In a further report on February 18 Vatutin stated that the 4th Guards Corps, which now contained the 35th and 41st Guards and the 244th Rifle Divisions, had been subordinated to the 6th Army. Kharkov had been liberated by forces of Voronezh Front on the 16th, and Vatutin now directed this Army to strike west and southwest towards both Zaporozhye and Melitopol.

On February 20 Army Group South launched its counterattack against the overextended Soviet forces; the rifle divisions of the two Fronts were by now reduced to roughly 1,000 men with a handful of guns and perhaps 50 mortars each. 6th Army, plus Povov's mobile group, was struck by the SS Panzer Corps advancing from Kransograd. Despite this the Army commander, Lt. Gen. F. M. Kharitonov, continued to press toward the Dniepr as per his orders. The XXXXVIII Panzer Corps joined the offensive on February 22; by now the true picture was becoming clear to the Soviet commanders and 4th Guards Corps was directed to begin pulling back eastward. On February 25 a motley assortment of Soviet remnants tried to halt the XXXX Panzer Corps at Barvenkovo before it could reach the northern Donets River and managed to hold until the afternoon of the 28th. On the 25th General Ivanov went missing in action in the confused fighting around Barvenkovo; he was eventually presumed killed and replaced on April 10 by Col. Andronik Sarkisovich Sarkisyan. At the beginning of March what remained of the 41st Guards and its Corps were under direct command of Southwestern Front.

== Drive for the Dniepr ==
In the first weeks of March the German armor turned north, retaking Kharkov by the 15th and Belgorod on the 18th. This, and the start of the spring rasputitsa, left the badly mauled 6th Army clear to begin rebuilding east of the Donets. By the start of April the division had returned to Army command, joining the new 30th Rifle Corps with the 38th and 62nd Guards Rifle Divisions. A month later this had been redesignated as the 26th Guards Rifle Corps and the division would remain under these commands until July. On June 23 Col. Konstantin Nikolaevich Tsvetkov took over command from Colonel Sarkisyan and would remain in this position in to the postwar period, being promoted to the rank of major general on October 25.

Prior to the start of Operation Polkovodets Rumyantsev the 41st Guards was again transferred, now to the 64th Rifle Corps of 57th Army, still in Southwestern Front. In this Corps it joined the 24th and 113th Rifle Divisions. On August 9 this Army joined the offensive east of Kharkov against the XXXXII Army Corps of Army Detachment Kempf. Two days later it liberated Chuguev. During fighting for the village of Vashishchevo on August 16 Jr. Lt. Sergei Nikolaevich Oreshkov, a platoon commander of the 124th Guards Rifle Regiment and acting commander of his company, came under machine gun fire from a German bunker. While attempting to attack the position with a grenade Oreshkov was severely wounded in both legs. His grenade's blast silenced the gun temporarily but as his men rushed forward it resumed firing. Oreshkov then sacrificed his life by blocking the embrasure with his body. For this action he was posthumously made a Hero of the Soviet Union on December 20. Late on August 22 German forces began withdrawing from Kharkov for the last time and it was entered by elements of the 57th and 69th Armies the next day. At about the same time the 57th Army was reassigned to Steppe Front, and the division was also reassigned to the 27th Guards Rifle Corps. It would remain in this Front (as of October 20 the 2nd Ukrainian Front) for the next 12 months.

Within days the division was again marching towards the Dniepr. On September 6 the Steppe Front was directed towards Kremenchug and lead elements of the 7th Guards Army forced a crossing southwest of that place on the night of September 25. The following night the division began its own crossing operation, led by Lt. Col. Aleksandr Filippovich Belyaev. This officer had been the divisional chief of staff and was currently the acting divisional commander in place of Colonel Tsvetkov. Assault troops seized the right bank village of Soshinovka and formed a bridgehead there. On September 28 alone Colonel Belyaev assisted in repulsing eight German counterattacks, and on November 3 he would be recommended for the gold star of a Hero of the Soviet Union. He was killed in action on December 11 near Kirovograd and his award came posthumously on December 20.

Before the end of September the 27th Guards Corps was disbanded, and the 41st Guards came under command of the 68th Rifle Corps. On October 7 the Front commander, Army Gen. I. S. Konev, submitted his plan to strike from the large bridgehead his forces had created between Kremenchug and Zaporozhye towards Pyatikhatka and Krivoi Rog with five armies, including the 57th. By October 19 the former was taken, but an attempt by 5th Guards Tank Army to take the latter from the march was checked by the 11th Panzer Division. Before the end of the month the division left both 68th Corps and 57th Army to come under direct command of the Front.

=== Kirovograd and Korsun-Shevchenkovsky ===
On November 13 the 2nd Ukrainian Front gained small bridgeheads on both sides of Cherkassy and quickly expanded the northern one until it threatened to engulf the city and tear open the front of the German 8th Army. Later that month the division was reassigned yet again, now to the 25th Guards Rifle Corps of 7th Guards Army, roughly in the center of the Front's sector northeast of Kirovograd. Through most of December and into January 1944 the Front was generally engaged in attrition battles but on the 5th of that month it threw a powerful blow at the boundary between 8th and 6th Armies with two shock groups, one of which consisted of the 7th Guards and 5th Guards Tank Armies. The assault penetrated nearly to Kirovograd in a matter of hours, and the next day swept north and south of the city, encircling the XXXXVII Panzer Corps. Army Group South intervened with two panzer divisions and on January 8 the XXXXVII Corps gave up the city and pulled back to the west.

The STAVKA began a new operation on January 25 to clear what was left of the German position on the Dniepr. 4th Guards Army penetrated the 8th Army front southwest of Cherkassy, setting the stage for a classic double envelopment in cooperation with elements of 1st Ukrainian Front. While German 8th Army pleaded for permission to evacuate its hopeless position the Soviet spearheads met at Shpola on the afternoon of the 28th, encircling 56,000 men of the XI and XXXXII Army Corps. By now the 41st Guards had been moved to the 24th Guards Rifle Corps of 7th Guards Army. On February 1 the commander of Army Group South, Field Marshal E. von Manstein, ordered a relief operation. This attack began on February 4 but was greatly slowed by mud and fog, and by forces of the 1st and 2nd Ukrainian Fronts moving up to seal the pocket. The German breakout began shortly before midnight on the 11th and initially took the Soviets by surprise, but soon bogged down. A renewed effort started after dark on February 16. During the fighting on February 17 two men of the division became Heroes of the Soviet Union. Guardsman Nikolai Yegorovich Sergienko took over command of his squad during combat in the village of Pochapintsy and organized a defense against the breakout which killed or wounded over 100 German officers and soldiers and took 43 more as prisoners. Sen. Lt. Gimai Faskhutdinovich Shaikhutdinov commanded a battery of the 89th Guards Artillery Regiment in the village of Zhurzhintsy. He directed the fire of his guns against the escaping German forces and after their shells were exhausted organized his men as infantry for a successful circular defense of their position. Both men received their Gold Stars on September 13; Shaikhutdinov survived the war, but Sergienko was killed in Vienna in April 1945. In recognition for its role in this battle the division was awarded its first honorific:

"KORSUN-SHEVCHENKOVSKY... 41st Guards Rifle Division (Major General Tsvetkov, Konstantin Nikolaevich)... The troops who participated in the battles near Korsun-Shevchenkovsky, by the order of the Supreme High Command of 18 February 1944, and a commendation in Moscow, are given a salute of 20 artillery salvoes from 224 guns.

During the battle the division came under the command of the 21st Guards Rifle Corps of 4th Guards Army; it would remain in this Army for the duration, either in this or the 20th Guards Rifle Corps with one brief exception.

== Jassy-Kishinev Offensives ==
During the Uman–Botoșani Offensive in March the 4th Guards Army, commanded by Lt. Gen. I. V. Galanin, led the left wing of its Front through western Ukraine towards the Dniestr River and the border with Romania. The 41st Guards had briefly served previously under Galanin in 24th Army near Stalingrad. The objectives of the left flank armies (including the 5th Guards and the 53rd) were to cross the river, capture the towns of Orgeev, Dubosarry, Grigoriopol and Tashlyk, and exploit to seize Kishinev in conjunction with 3rd Ukrainian Front. 4th Guards Army, which had already made a crossing in late March with its lead corps, was directed southwards in the first days of April towards Orgeev on the north bank of the Răut River, 40 km north of Kishinev.

Galinin opened his attack at dawn on April 3. 20th Guards Corps (5th, 6th and 7th Guards Airborne, 41st and 62nd Guards Rifle Divisions) was deployed in the Army's center, flanked by 21st Guards and 75th Rifle Corps. They faced the bulk of the XXXXVII and XXXX Panzer Corps of German 8th Army; the latter Corps, with a battle group from 13th Panzer Division, was defending a bridgehead between the Dniestr and the Răut north and northeast of Orgeev. XXXX Panzer Corps also defended a large bridgehead east of the Dniestr northeast of Grigoriopol. The two Guards corps managed to advance only 3–5 km against stiffening German resistance, and the 75th Corps was bogged down along mud-clogged roads well to the rear:

Overcoming the increasing enemy resistance became more difficult because our forces had inadequate artillery support and ammunition. Of the army's 700 guns no more than 200 were in their firing positions. The remainder lagged behind... No less difficult was the process of supplying ammunition... We used every conceivable means of transport, including carrying the shells forward by hand.

In a regrouping just as the assault was beginning the 3rd Panzer Division was made responsible for the bridgehead north of Orgeev, anchoring its defense on the village strongpoint of Susleny, 13 km northeast of the town. In addition the 11th Panzer Division took up reserve positions south of Orgeev.

The Army's offensive was renewed on April 5. Five divisions of 20th Guards Corps, including the 41st, assaulted the 13th and 3rd Panzer Divisions' defenses west and north of Ogreev but made only modest gains in heavy fighting. When the 5th Guards Airborne failed to take the town from the march it was reinforced with the 41st Guards and both divisions were ordered to regroup for a coordinated attack the next day. Attacking at dawn the two divisions stormed the positions of 13th Panzer and captured the town, while 5th Airborne managed to seize a small bridgehead into the swampy terrain across the Răut. During the next two days the guardsmen of both divisions struggled to take Hill 185 which dominated the bridgehead and finally succeeded despite the intervention of elements of 11th Panzer. By April 9 the bridgehead was 7 km wide and over 3 km deep, but the arrival of the rest of 11th Panzer halted any further advance. The German forces launched repeated counterattacks into April 11 as both sides reinforced. Meanwhile, 3rd Panzer was forced out of Susleny and retreated across the Răut, allowing the 21st Guards Corps to also force the river and soon link up with the 20th Guards Corps. This created a larger bridgehead, but the cost to both sides in the fighting to this point had been severe. 4th Guards Army's divisions were down to a combat strength of roughly 5,000 men each and were no longer capable of offensive operations. On April 18 Konev authorized Galinin to go over to the defense.

=== Second Jassy-Kishinev Offensive ===
Over the next three months the Army remained along much the same lines as its forces were rebuilt. It was noted in July that the personnel of 41st Guards were roughly 20 percent Russians and 80 percent conscripted Ukrainians. In the plan for the new offensive the main effort of 2nd Ukrainian Front was to be made in the western part of its sector between Jassy and Târgu Frumos and the 4th Guards Army was assigned the task of securely holding its line until the former was taken by 52nd Army, at which point it was to attack along the east bank of the Prut River to help effect the encirclement of the Kishinev group of Axis forces.

The main offensive began on August 20, but the Army was not committed until the morning of August 22, led by the 78th Rifle Corps and the 5th Guards Airborne of 20th Guards Corps. This shock group broke through the Axis defense along a 12 km front from Bogdanesti to Pyrlica, and at 1500 hours the town of Ungheni was taken; this was the first of several crossings of the Prut to be captured. By the end of the day the penetration was up to 25 km deep and the German 376th Infantry Division was routed and suffered heavy losses. The next day the Axis forces in front of the Army were in full retreat, determined to pull out of the trap forming around Kishinev and escape west of the Prut. 20th Guards Corps began its attack before dawn with two divisions. By the end of the day the Corps had reached Gauryany to Selishte and then to the east. The key objective for August 24 was to link up with 3rd Ukrainian Front and complete the encirclement, and throughout the day the Corps advanced without encountering serious resistance, meeting elements of 3rd Ukrainian along the Prut. Kishinev was occupied the same day and two regiments of the 41st Guards were honored for their parts in the operation:

"CHISINAU... 122nd Guards Rifle Regiment (Lieutenant Colonel Klimov, Nikolai Ivanovich)... 89th Guards Artillery Regiment (Lieutenant Colonel Kvashnin, Nikolai Konstantinovich)... The troops who participated in the liberation of Chisinau, by the order of the Supreme High Command of 24 August 1944, and a commendation in Moscow, are given a salute of 24 artillery salvoes from 324 guns.

On September 15 the 124th Guards Rifle Regiment would be awarded the Order of Kutuzov, 3rd Degree, for its part in the battle for the city.

On the morning of August 25 the retreating German VII Army Corps was at the Prut crossings in the Kotumori area with some units already across the river and rear elements of that and the IV Army Corps piling up near the bridges. While 78th Corps engaged these forces, 20th Guards Corps continued its advance, reaching the rear of 5th Shock Army. During the day the strong pressure from 5th Shock and 57th Armies was breaking up the encircled German 6th Army. By the morning of August 28 the 4th Guards Army had moved southwest to the Vaslui area at the confluence of the Vaslui and Bârlad Rivers. Remnants of the German and Romanian forces, after clearing the Prut, were making their way to escape across the Bârlad as well. The next day Konev ordered the Army to continue its advance west of the river towards Bârlad and to mop up Axis groups hiding in the woods along its route of march. The last 10,000 of these were not finally rounded up until September 1–4 in the area west of the Siret River and east of Onești.

== Budapest Offensive ==
Later in September the 41st Guards was withdrawn into the Reserve of the Supreme High Command where it joined the 21st Guards Corps, still in 4th Guards Army. The Army remained in the Reserve into November when it was reassigned to 3rd Ukrainian Front, where it would remain for the duration. By November 24 the Corps reached the east bank of the Danube from Nagyvadasz to Mohács. Overnight the division forced the river by improvised means southeast of the latter and by 1800 hours on the 26th, having captured Mohács, linked up with forces of 57th Army attacking southward. Part of the success of the division in this operation was attributed to getting all of its light artillery and mortars into its bridgehead in the first 24 hours. By the end of December 8 all of 4th Guards Army had reached a line between Lakes Velence and Balaton where it went over to the defensive. On January 6, 1945 the division was awarded the honorific "Danube" for its successes in this crossing; on the same date the 126th Guards Rifle Regiment was awarded the same distinction, while the 124th Guards Rifle received the Order of Suvorov, 3rd Degree and the 89th Guards Artillery won the Order of Aleksandr Nevsky for their victories in fighting for Szekszárd, Kaposvár, Paks, Bonyhád and Dombóvár.

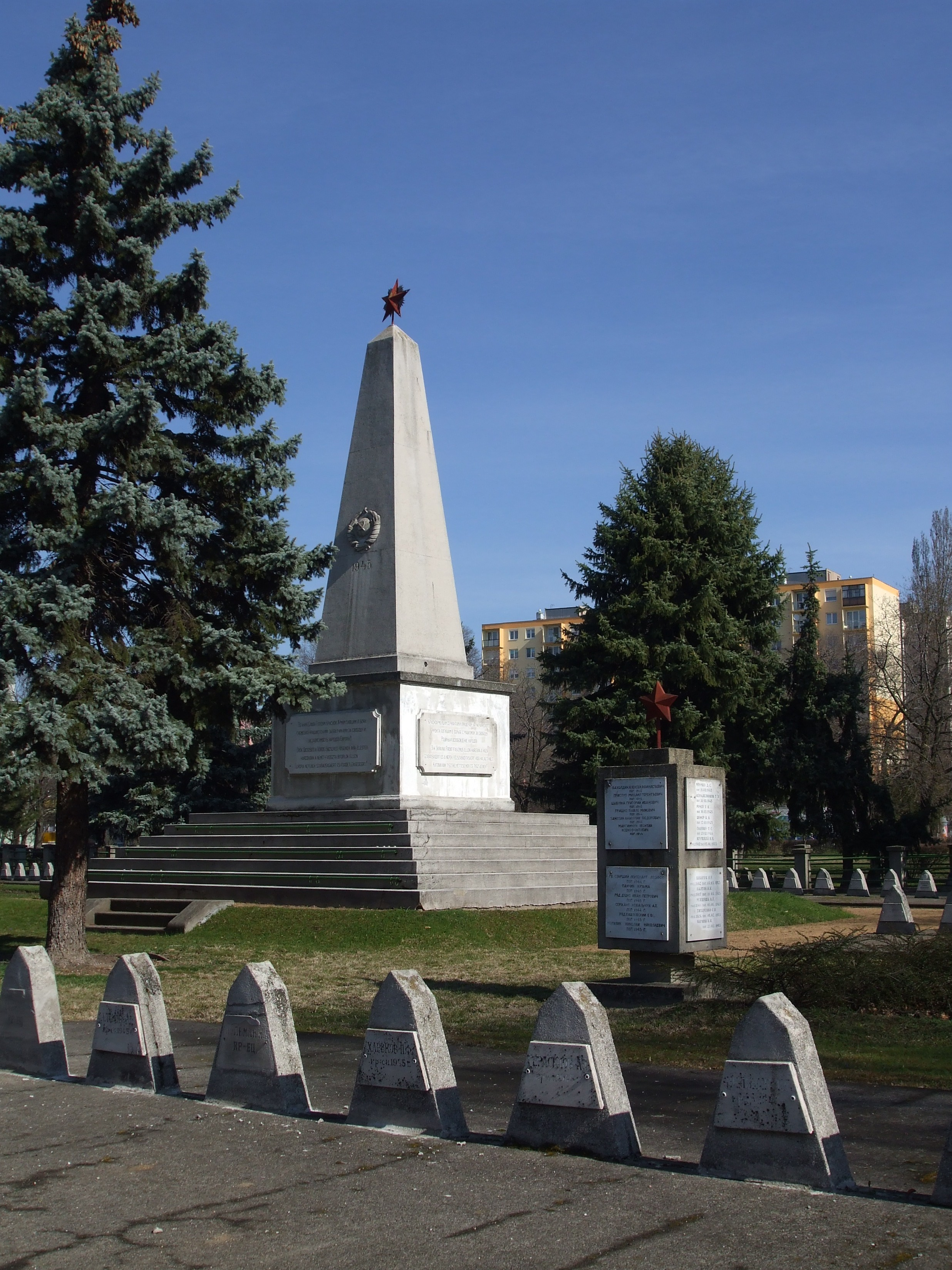
Soviet memorial today in Székesfehérvár

As of December 20 the division was deployed along the Budapest direction and the 21st Guards Corps consisted of the 41st, 62nd and 69th Guards Rifle Divisions. The same day the 46th Army launched an attack along the Baracska front in an effort to break through the "Margarita Line" and soon penetrated the Axis defenses. The 4th Guards Army soon joined the offensive. 41st Guards gave fire support to the 252nd Rifle Division before attacking itself at 1330 hours and after repelling counterattacks occupied Tác by the end of the day. Overnight the Army advanced up to 3 km and captured several strongpoints on the approaches to Székesfehérvár and Kisfalud. By the end of December it had the former place surrounded on three sides before coming to a halt. The 41st Guards turned over its combat sector to the 252nd Division and took over the positions of the 93rd Rifle Division on the northern outskirts of Székesfehérvár, while the division was reassigned to the 135th Rifle Corps.

During December the 2nd and 3rd Ukrainian Fronts had been able to encircle and besiege Budapest but on January 2 German forces began a series of counterattacks from the area southeast of Komárom in an effort to relieve the pocket. This assault struck the 31st Guards Rifle Corps and forced it back. The Army was forced to regroup and the 41st was one of four rifle divisions, plus elements of 5th Guards Cavalry Corps, deployed to cover the breakthrough sector from the southeast and south. Over the first three days the counteroffensive gained up to 30 km and reached the approaches to Bicske, but slowed to a halt shortly thereafter.

The same day the Front was ordered to counterstrike with its 4th Guards Army, 5th Guards Cavalry, 18th Tank and 1st Guards Mechanized Corps from northwest of Bicske towards Komárom. This plan was put aside when the German forces renewed their attacks on January 7, now from the area northwest of Székesfehérvár, but made only slight progress. By January 13 they were forced to halt offensive operations along the entire front. The offensive began again on January 18 with up to 130 tanks and assault guns and up to 60 armored halftracks, and managed to break through the 135th Corps' defenses along a 20 km front. The Army committed the 7th Mechanized Corps into the fighting but before it could arrive the German tanks had reached the Sarviz Canal and inflicted heavy losses on the units of 135th Corps. The 21st Guards Corps was moved to strengthen the defenses near Székesfehérvár; at this time that the 41st Guards was deployed 12–14 km north of this place and soon returned to that command for the duration. The defensive fighting in this area continued until January 27, when 4th Guards Army went over to the attack at 1000 hours to eliminate the German penetration. This was largely completed by February 3 and ten days later the Axis forces in Budapest surrendered.

=== Vienna Offensive ===
4th Guards Army played a relatively small role on the defensive during the German Operation Spring Awakening, which began on March 6. Once the attack had been brought to a halt the Soviet counteroffensive began on the 16th, and on March 18, in cooperation with the 9th Guards Army, it broke through IV SS Panzer Corps between Mór and Lake Velence. This success helped set the stage for the advance on Vienna. On March 27 the two armies, now joined with 6th Guards Tank Army, crossed the Raab River on a broad front west of Kőszeg. By March 30 the 4th Guards Army had begun to wheel northwest of Vienna, helping to partially encircle it and render it untenable. On April 5 the 41st Guards was recognized for its part in the battles for Budapest with the award of the Order of Suvorov, 2nd Degree, while the 126th Guards Rifle and 89th Guards Artillery Regiments each received the Order of Kutuzov, 3rd Degree, and the 124th Guards Rifle was granted the city's name as an honorific.

On April 11 the 4th Guards Army stormed the Vienna canals and the city fell two days later. The division was given garrison duty there for the next few weeks, and on April 26 the 126th Guards Rifle Regiment was further decorated with the Order of Suvorov, 3rd Degree, for its part in the taking of the towns of Chorno and Sárvár in Hungary. In early May it advanced into western Austria where it linked up with American forces in the area of Waidhofen an der Ybbs.

== Postwar ==
After the end of the fighting the 122nd Guards Rifle Regiment was decorated on May 17 with the Order of Kutuzov, 3rd Degree, for its part in the capture of Vienna. In June the division moved to the region of Neunkirchen. It was stationed there until September. According to Stavka command No. 1/00384, dated October 11, the 41st Guards was reorganized into the 18th Guards Mechanized, Korsun-Danube, Order of Suvorov Division.

Later the division became the 41st Guards Tank Division.
