= Karazhensky =

Karazhensky Караженский
- Khutor
- Location within Volgograd Oblast Location within Russia
- Coordinates: 49°20′N 43°01′E
- Country: Russia
- Region: Volgograd Oblast
- District: Kletsky District
- Time zone: UTC+4:00

Karazhensky (Russian: Караженский) is a rural locality (a khutor) in Kletskoye Rural Settlement, Kletsky District, Volgograd Oblast, Russia. The population was 228 as of 2010. There are 4 streets.

== Geography ==
Karazhensky is located 4 km northwest of Kletskaya (the district's administrative centre) by road. Podnizhny is the nearest rural locality.
