= Perekopskaya =

Perekopskaya Перекопская
- Stanitsa
- Location within Volgograd Oblast Location within Russia
- Coordinates: 49°24′N 43°20′E
- Country: Russia
- Region: Volgograd Oblast
- District: Kletsky District
- Time zone: UTC+4:00

Perekopskaya (Russian: Перекопская) is a rural locality (a stanitsa) in Kremenskoye Rural Settlement, Kletsky District, Volgograd Oblast, Russia. The population was 75 as of 2010. There are 10 streets.

== Geography ==
Perekopskaya is located in steppe, on the right bank of the Don River, 34 km northeast of Kletskaya (the district's administrative centre) by road. Perekopka is the nearest rural locality.
