= Yevstratovsky =

Yevstratovsky Евстратовский
- Khutor
- Location within Volgograd Oblast Location within Russia
- Coordinates: 49°11′N 42°52′E
- Country: Russia
- Region: Volgograd Oblast
- District: Kletsky District
- Time zone: UTC+4:00

Yevstratovsky (Russian: Евстратовский) is a rural locality (a khutor) in Zakharovskoye Rural Settlement, Kletsky District, Volgograd Oblast, Russia. The population was 407 as of 2010. There are 15 streets.

== Geography ==
Yevstratovsky is located on the bank of the Kurtlak River, 20 km southwest of Kletskaya (the district's administrative centre) by road. Zakharov is the nearest rural locality.
