= Ventsy =

Ventsy Венцы
- Khutor
- Location within Volgograd Oblast Location within Russia
- Coordinates: 49°10′N 43°18′E
- Country: Russia
- Region: Volgograd Oblast
- District: Kletsky District
- Time zone: UTC+4:00

Ventsy (Russian: Венцы) is a rural locality (a khutor) in Verkhnebuzinovskoye Rural Settlement, Kletsky District, Volgograd Oblast, Russia. The population was 119 as of 2010.

== Geography ==
Ventsy is located in steppe on the left bank of the Ventsy River, 31 km southeast of Kletskaya (the district's administrative centre) by road. Verkhnyaya Buzinovka is the nearest rural locality.
