= Zhirkovsky =

Zhirkovsky Жирковский
- Khutor
- Location within Volgograd Oblast Location within Russia
- Coordinates: 49°16′N 42°33′E
- Country: Russia
- Region: Volgograd Oblast
- District: Kletsky District
- Time zone: UTC+4:00

Zhirkovsky (Russian: Жирковский) is a rural locality (a khutor) in Verkhnecherenskoye Rural Settlement, Kletsky District, Volgograd Oblast, Russia. The population was 165 as of 2010. There are 6 streets.

== Geography ==
Zhirkovsky is located on the bank of the Tsaritsa River, 50 km west of Kletskaya (the district's administrative centre) by road. Srednetsaritsynsky is the nearest rural locality.
