= 205th Rifle Division =

205th Motorized Division (February 1941 - June 30, 1941) 205th Rifle Division (October 1, 1941 - August 30, 1942) 205th Rifle Division (June 26, 1943 - June 1946)
- Active: 1941–1946
- Country: Soviet Union
- Branch: Red Army
- Type: Infantry
- Role: Motorized Infantry
- Size: Division
- Engagements: Operation Barbarossa; Battle of Białystok–Minsk; Battle of Stalingrad; Continuation War; East Pomeranian offensive Siege of Danzig (1945); Berlin Strategic Offensive Operation; Bornholm landings
- Decorations: Order of Suvorov (2nd Formation)
- Battle honours: Gdynia (2nd Formation)

Commanders
- Notable commanders: Col. Filipp Fyodorovich Kudyurov; Col. Aleksei Yakovlevich Khvostov; Maj. Gen. Ivan Alekseevich Makarenko; Col. Fyodor Ivanovich Litvinov; Maj. Gen. Mikhail Alekseevich Beloskurskii

The 205th Rifle Division was twice formed as an infantry division of the Red Army after a motorized division of that same number was destroyed in the first days of the German invasion of the Soviet Union. The first formation was based on the shtat (table of organization and equipment) of July 29, 1941 and it then remained for nine months in the far east of Siberia training and organizing before it was finally sent by rail to the Stalingrad region in July 1942. It was assigned to the 4th Tank Army which was attempting to hold a bridgehead west of the Don River based on Kremenskaya and Sirotinskaya. This soon came under attack by elements of German 6th Army as a preliminary to its advance on Stalingrad itself and during August the division was encircled and destroyed.

In June 1943 the 1941 formation of the 186th Rifle Division was redesignated as the 205th in large part to eliminate confusion with the 1939 formation of the 186th which was concurrently in service. The new 205th remained in 26th Army of Karelian Front until late 1944 when the Continuation War with Finland was over, after which it was moved to the south and eventually assigned to the 19th Army of 2nd Belorussian Front which fought through East Pomerania in February and March 1945, winning a battle honor and a decoration in the process. While it saw little action in the Berlin campaign it was soon involved in the landings on the German-occupied Danish island of Bornholm under command of 43rd Army. The 205th remained there until it was returned to the mainland in May 1946 and was soon after disbanded.

== 205th Motorized Division ==
The division began forming in February 1941 as part of the prewar buildup of Soviet mechanized forces, based on a tank brigade at Byaroza in the Western Special Military District as part of the 14th Mechanized Corps. Once formed its order of battle was as follows:

- 226th Motorized Rifle Regiment
- 721st Motorized Rifle Regiment
- 127th Tank Regiment
- 672nd Artillery Regiment
- 30th Antitank Battalion
- 164th Antiaircraft Battalion
- 293rd Reconnaissance Battalion
- 394th Light Engineering Battalion
- 598th Signal Battalion
- 203rd Artillery Park Battalion
- 369th Medical/Sanitation Battalion
- 688th Motor Transport Battalion
- 112th Repair and Restoration Battalion
- 46th Regulatory Company
- 482nd Chemical Defense (Anti-gas) Company
- 498th Field Postal Station
- 921st Field Office of the State Bank

Col. Filipp Fyodorovich Kudyurov was appointed to command on March 11. Once formed the division was at full strength in artillery and other heavy weapons, including mortars, antitank guns and even antiaircraft guns, but the 127th had only one battalion of tanks and in common with most of the other motorized divisions was missing most of its authorized trucks and tractors so was "motorized" mostly in name only.

On June 22 the 14th Mechanized Corps (22nd and 30th Tank Divisions, 205th Motorized, 20th Motorcycle Regiment) was under command of 4th Army in the renamed Western Front. The 205th was still located near Byaroza and began moving southwest during the day toward Zaprudy and Kobryn, parallel with the 30th Tanks to its north. According to the operational plan the 14th Mechanized was to link up with 28th Rifle Corps to counterattack the German forces that had encircled and were pushing past Brest. During this move the division came under heavy air attacks and lost most of the vehicles it had. During the following days it became trapped in the Białystok pocket and was effectively destroyed, being stricken from the Red Army's order of battle on June 30. Colonel Kudyurov managed to escape and went on to command the 40th Cavalry Division; he was killed in action in the Crimea in December.

== 1st Formation ==
A new division began forming as a regular rifle division on October 1, 1941 at Khabarovsk in the Far Eastern Front on the basis of the Krasnaya Rechka Separate Rifle Regiment with a similar order of battle:

- 577th Rifle Regiment
- 721st Rifle Regiment
- 731st Rifle Regiment
- 672nd Artillery Regiment
- 30th Antitank Battalion
- 167th Antiaircraft Battery
- 792nd Mortar Battalion
- 293rd Reconnaissance Company
- 394th Sapper Battalion
- 598th Signal Battalion
- 369th Medical/Sanitation Battalion
- 195th Chemical Defense (Anti-gas) Company
- 515th Motor Transport Company
- 357th Field Bakery
- 834th Divisional Veterinary Hospital
- 1488th Field Postal Station
- 922nd Field Office of the State Bank

Col. Aleksei Yakovlevich Khvostov was assigned to command the division on the day it began forming. On April 22, 1942, he was moved to command of the 18th Cavalry Corps and would later lead the 5th Rifle Corps and the 51st Rifle Division, being promoted to the rank of major general in June 1944. He was replaced by Maj. Gen. Ivan Alekseevich Makarenko who had previously led the 79th and 12th Rifle Divisions. The division remained in the Far Eastern Front reserves until July 1942 when it was rushed west to the front, being assigned to 4th Tank Army in Stalingrad Front.

=== Battle of Stalingrad ===
By August 1 the 205th had joined the 4th, which was already so depleted in armor in its 22nd Tank Corps that it was derisively being referred to as the "4 Tank Army"; it also contained the 18th Rifle Division and the 5th Destroyer Antitank Brigade. Elements of German 6th Army reached Kalach-na-Donu on August 7 and inflicted a serious defeat on the Soviet 62nd Army over the following days, clearing the west bank of the Don River on this sector. Its obvious next target was the 50 km-wide bridgehead being held by 4th Tank Army south of Kremenskaya and Sirotinskaya. By this time the Army had been reinforced with the 184th, 192nd and 321st Rifle Divisions and the 54th Fortified Region. On August 14 the 205th was reported as having 8,374 personnel on strength.

The expected attack had begun the previous day. 6th Army concentrated 11 divisions, including one panzer and two motorized, on the 55 km front. The 205th was deployed on 4th Tank Army's right (west) flank and was supported by the 321st and the recently arrived 343rd Rifle Division; these were faced by the XI Army Corps in what was intended as a diversionary attack. The STAVKA intended to back 4th Tank Army with the 1st Guards Army, but this was still en route. The main attack began at 0630 hours on August 15 following a two-hour artillery preparation. With air support the XIV Panzer Corps and VIII Army Corps demolished the defenses of the 192nd, 184th and 205th Divisions and pushed rapidly eastward. By day's end the 205th and 192nd were reported as having been enveloped from the flanks and fighting in encirclement in the Oskinskii region. The attack effectively split 4th Tank Army into two halves, forcing the 205th to withdraw toward Kremenskaya along with the 321st and 343rd.

As the situation deteriorated the leading elements of 1st Guards Army began to arrive in the area and the three divisions, along with the 40th Guards Rifle Division, were ordered to counterattack at dawn on August 17. This effort faltered from the start as 6th Army pressed its advantage. The 376th Infantry Division captured Kremenskaya and the 40th Guards was forced to fight defensively to prevent the bridgehead from being liquidated entirely. By the end of the day 4th Tank Army was "no longer combat capable"; the 205th, among other divisions, was decimated and had run out of ammunition. In desperation it was transferred to control of 1st Guards but its bypassed remnants were already being mopped up. Despite 6th Army's claim of a complete success the Red Army managed to hold a portion of the bridgehead, which would provide a springboard for the counteroffensive in November. Later in August the 205th was officially disbanded. General Makarenko took over command of the 321st (later the 82nd Guards Rifle Division) on August 24 and would be promoted to the rank of lieutenant general shortly before his retirement in 1958.

== 2nd Formation ==
The next formation of the 205th was actually a redesignation of the 1941 formation of the 186th Rifle Division in the 26th Army of Karelian Front. This had been formed as a militia division in September 1941 in the Murmansk region and was designated as 1st Polar for about a month. It was then put on the footing of a regular division and inexplicably given the same number (and subunit designations) as the existing 186th, which had been formed in 1939. When the redesignation was complete on June 26, 1943, the 205th had the same order of battle as the 1st formation with a few exceptions:

- it contained no antiaircraft battery or mortar battalion
- the field bakery was designated as the 306th
- the field postal station was the 01453rd (later 1483rd) and the office of the state bank was the 915th

In addition the signal battalion would later be replaced with the 293rd Signal Company. Given the challenges of the harsh and almost roadless terrain of the far north the 672nd Artillery Regiment was recorded in September 1944 as having the following equipment:

- 1st and 2nd Battalions, each with two batteries of four M1909 mountain guns and one battery of four 122mm howitzers;
- 3rd Battalion with three batteries of four 122mm howitzers each.

The mountain guns were horse drawn (or animal-packed) while the howitzers were towed by tractors.

The division was located at Kestenga at the time of its redesignation and was serving in the 31st Rifle Corps which also contained the 45th and 61st Rifle Divisions and the 85th Naval Rifle Brigade. It remained under the command of Col. Fyodor Ivanovich Litvinov who had led the 186th since June 2, 1942, but he would be replaced on July 7 by Col. Mikhail Alekseevich Beloskurskii. Litvinov was sent to study at the Voroshilov Academy before returning to the front to command the 25th Rifle Division; Beloskurskii had previously led the 61st Naval Infantry Brigade and would be promoted to the rank of major general on November 2, 1944.

=== Continuation War ===
Through the rest of 1943 the situation along Karelian Front remained effectively static, but the situation began to change when the German/Finnish siege of Leningrad was finally broken in January 1944. From this point Finland came under increasing pressure to leave the war. On June 10 the Leningrad and Karelian Fronts went over to the offensive against both the Finnish Army and the remaining German forces in the country. At this time the 205th was still in 26th Army in 31st Corps with the 45th and 83rd Rifle Divisions; the Army also contained the 54th and 367th Rifle Divisions. In its positions it faced elements of the German XVIII Mountain Corps over the next several months, while to the south Finland was being driven out of the war in the Vyborg–Petrozavodsk Offensive. During September the 205th was serving as a separate division within 26th Army. On September 4/5 a Soviet-Finnish cease-fire went into effect, and on the 6th the German forces in Finland began Operation Birke, with the goal of a withdrawal into Norway, although the Germans were secretly determined to hold the Pechenga District for the sake of the nickel mines there. XVIII Mountain Corps withdrew by stages, and 26th Army followed up as far as the 1940 Soviet-Finnish border.

On September 15 fighting between the Finnish and German Armies, the Lapland War, began. By the end of the month the German OKW had decided that holding Pechenga was no longer necessary or desirable; meanwhile the STAVKA was expanding its 14th Army for the Petsamo–Kirkenes offensive and its 26th and 19th Armies in Karelia were not necessary for this offensive. As of November 1 the 205th was under command of the 132nd Rifle Corps but within weeks the remainder of 26th Army had been moved to the Reserve of the Supreme High Command for redeployment.

== Into Poland and Germany ==
During December as it moved south the division joined the 134th Rifle Corps in 32nd Army in the Reserve, but in January 1945 this Corps was reassigned to 19th Army which became part of 2nd Belorussian Front shortly after the start of the Vistula-Oder offensive. This became effective from midnight on January 28. 134th Corps had concentrated in the Ostrów Mazowiecka area and consisted of the 205th, 272nd and 310th Rifle Divisions.

=== East Pomeranian Offensive ===
As early as February 10 the 19th Army was concentrating in the Dobrzyń–Lipno–Rypin area; in addition to the 134th the Army contained the 40th Guards and 132nd Rifle Corps. The Front was generally facing the German 2nd Army of Army Group Vistula. The 65th, 49th and 70th Armies went over to the attack that day, primarily from a bridgehead over the Vistula that was being held by 65th Army near Graudenz. Meanwhile, the Front commander, Marshal K. K. Rokossovskii, ordered the 19th Army and 3rd Guards Tank Corps, which constituted his reserve, to begin moving to the left of his attacking forces, with the 19th concentrating in the Chojnice–Lubiewo–Tuchel area by February 21. The first stage of the Front's offensive gained up to 70 km in 10 days but was effectively halted by February 19.

New instructions from the STAVKA on February 17 called for 2nd Army to be cut off from the main German forces prior to its final destruction. To this end the 19th Army and 3rd Guards Tanks were to attack on February 24 to reach the Baltic in the Kolberg sector. The Army was reinforced with the 3rd Artillery Breakthrough Corps and relieved elements of 70th Army along a line from Deringsdorf to Preußisch Friedland, although later than the plan called for. It faced the reinforced 32nd Infantry Division and the 15th SS Grenadier Division (1st Latvian). The 134th and 40th Guards Corps were in first echelon with the 132nd Corps in second; 134th Corps had its divisions three echelons. The width of the breakthrough sector was 10 km and the average artillery density (76mm calibre or larger) reached 152 guns and mortars per kilometre. Being fresh the Army's rifle divisions averaged a personnel strength of 8,000, roughly double that of the Front's other divisions which had been in near-continuous combat for over a month.

Following a 40-minute artillery preparation 19th Army launched its assault in the direction of Köslin and broke through the defense along the entire sector, overcoming stubborn resistance and counterattacks by German armor. The leading corps advanced 10–12 km through the day and widened the gap to 20 km. On February 25 the Army continued to develop the offensive, assisted by the left flank units of 70th Army and the 3rd Guards Cavalry Corps, gaining another 10–12 km and widening the breakthrough gap to 30 km, into which the 3rd Guards Tank Corps was introduced. Meanwhile, the center and right-wing armies of the Front were having no success against established German defenses. The following day, assisted by the tanks and cavalry, 19th Army captured Schlochau, Stegers and Hammerstein after a further advance of up to 22 km, with the armor operating as much as 30 km forward of the rifle divisions. On April 5 the 205th would be awarded the Order of Suvorov, 2nd Degree, for its role in the capture of these towns and others. The XVIII Mountain Corps and VII Panzer Corps were forced to fall back to the north, putting up minimal resistance. At this point the 19th Army's commander, Lt. Gen. G. K. Kozlov, began to lose control of his battle as communications became disrupted, marching units fell behind and the artillery lagged due to poor road conditions.

Kozlov spent February 27 largely in putting his forces in order while attacking toward Prechlau in conjunction with 70th Army while also beating off up to 24 counterattacks from German tanks and infantry. Rokossovskii ordered Kozlov to resume his advance the next day to reach a line from Rummelsburg to Groß Karzenburg to Worchow by the end of the day. He specifically directed as follows:

... b) the 134th Rifle Corps' main forces were to reach the line Gross Karzenburg – excluding the Wirchowsee; one rifle division was to be moved to the Worchow area...

The German forces, which included the XXXXVI Panzer Corps, were putting up their fiercest resistance in the Rummelsburg area, mounting numerous counterattacks. The fighting for the town continued until March 3 when it finally fell and 19th Army advanced an additional 20 km during the day, reaching the area north of Pollnow.

=== Danzig Offensive ===
19th Army reached the Baltic coast on March 5 north and northeast of Köslin on a 20 km-wide sector and German 2nd Army was effectively isolated. It was now directed to advance, still with 3rd Guards Tanks, in the direction of Stolp and Putzing. The 134th Rifle Corps was leading the Army and on March 7 linked up with 1st Belorussian Front on the outskirts of Kolberg. The main forces of 2nd Army were already falling back to the Danzig–Gdynia fortified area. On March 8 the 1st Guards Tank Army was assigned to the Front and was ordered to support 19th Army. During March 11–12 the two Armies advanced 35 km, capturing Neustadt and Reda before closing up to the fortified lines the next day.

Rokossovskii's plan to seize the fortified area was to first attack in the direction of Zoppot to reach the shore and split the defenses of the two cities. 19th and 1st Guards Tank Armies would attack Gdynia from the north; the 19th would employ the 40th Guards and 134th Corps with armor support while a detachment from the 132nd Corps, also with tanks, was responsible for taking the Hel Peninsula. The assault would also be supported by the 1st and 18th Artillery Breakthrough Divisions and the 4th Guards Mortar Division. The garrison consisted of the remnants of VII Panzer Corps including the 7th Panzer and 32nd Infantry Divisions and the 4th SS Panzer Group. The attack began on March 14 but despite the preponderance of force made little progress up to March 22, on some days no progress at all. Zoppot fell on the 23rd in part to 19th Army's forces while the remainder fought for the second defense line in Gdynia. This line was finally broken by the end of March 26. Despite 1st Guards Tanks being pulled out of the battle overnight on March 26/27 after two further days of street fighting the 40th Guards and 134th Corps cleared Gdynia and its suburbs by the end of March 28. In recognition of this victory the division was granted an honorific:

GDYNIA... 205th Rifle Division (Maj. Gen. Beloskurskii, Mikhail Alekseevich)... The troops who participated in the liberation of Gdynia, by the order of the Supreme High Command of 28 March 1945, and a commendation in Moscow, are given a salute of 20 artillery salvoes from 224 guns.

Despite this success the following day General Beloskurskii was removed from command of the division and placed at the disposal of the Front command. He would lead the 372nd Rifle Division in the last weeks of the war and serve as a military adviser to both the Romanian and Hungarian Armies in the mid-1950s before his retirement in February 1957. He was replaced by Col. Yan Petrovich Sinkevich, who in turn was replaced by Col. Pyotr Grigorevich Nosov on April 25.

=== Berlin Operation and Bornholm Landings ===
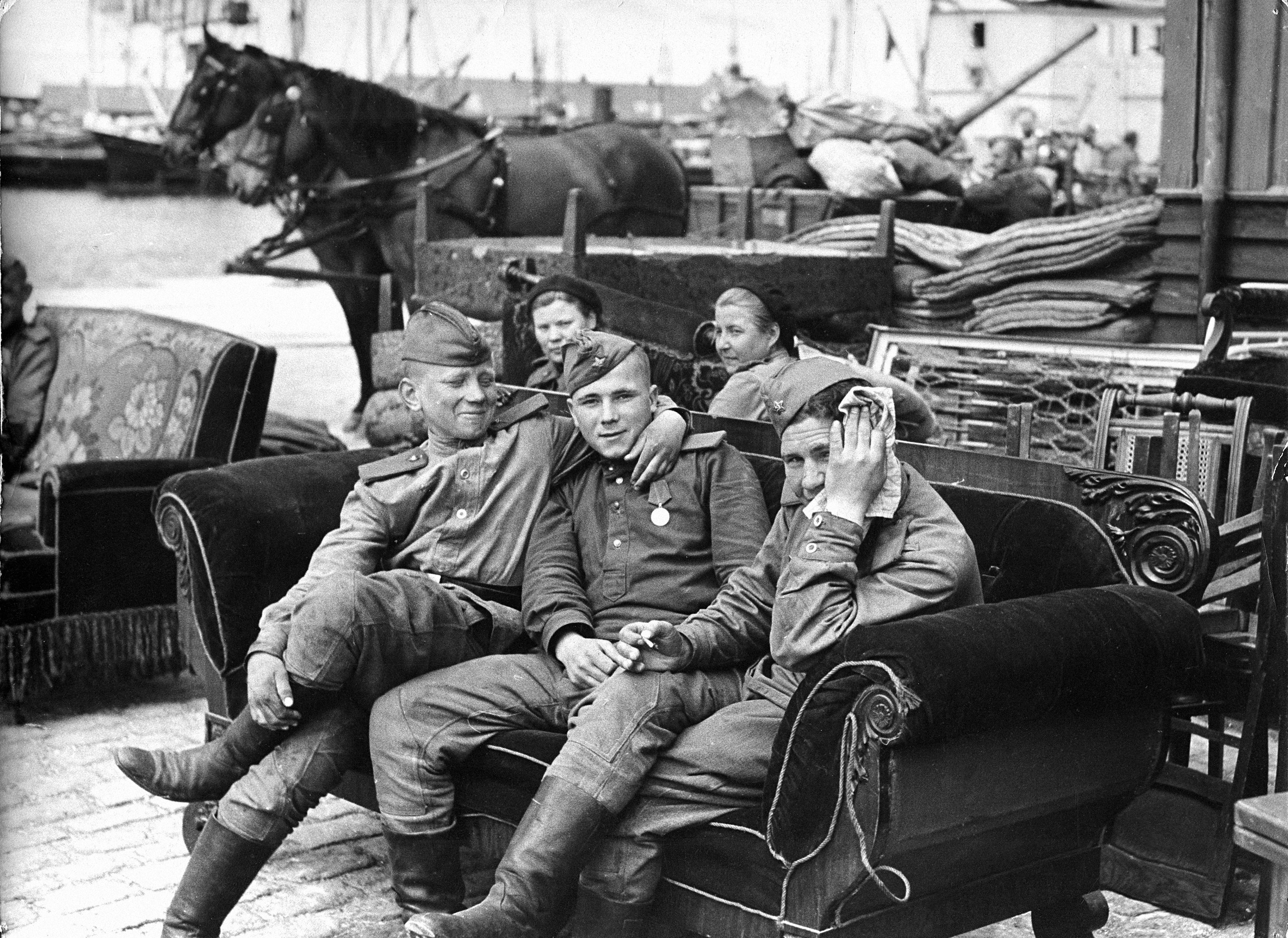
Men and women of 132nd Corps relax after the Bornholm landings

After the East Pomeranian operation concluded on March 31 the 2nd Belorussian Front was redeployed to the lower Oder River for the final offensive into central Germany. The Front began its crossing operations on April 20 but 19th Army was not part of the Front's assault force and did not join the offensive until April 29. Meanwhile, the 43rd Army was transferred on April 24 from the Zemland Group of Forces to 2nd Belorussian Front. By the beginning of May the 205th had been transferred to 132nd Rifle Corps, joining the 18th Rifle Division.

A few days later the Corps came under command of 43rd Army and the two divisions were designated to make landings to clear German forces from the Danish island of Bornholm. The garrison commander, Navy Captain Gerhard von Kamptz, refused to surrender his 12,000 troops to Soviet forces; in response the Red Air Force carried out bombing raids on May 7/8. The landings followed on May 9 and after a short fight the garrison surrendered.

== Postwar ==
The men and women of the division ended the war with the full title 205th Rifle, Gdynia, Order of Suvorov Division. (Russian: 205-я стрелковая Гдынская ордена Суворова дивизия.) It remained on Bornholm after the end of the war with the Corps, part of 43rd Army in the Northern Group of Forces from June 1945, and was disbanded in June 1946 after the Corps was withdrawn to Poland on May 4.
