= Zotovsky =

Zotovsky Зотовский
- Khutor
- Location within Volgograd Oblast Location within Russia
- Coordinates: 49°02′N 42°43′E
- Country: Russia
- Region: Volgograd Oblast
- District: Kletsky District
- Time zone: UTC+4:00

Zotovsky (Russian: Зотовский) is a rural locality (a khutor) in Kalmykovskoye Rural Settlement, Kletsky District, Volgograd Oblast, Russia. The population was 209 as of 2010. There are 6 streets.

== Geography ==
Zotovsky is located in steppe, on the Krepkaya River, 43 km southwest of Kletskaya (the district's administrative centre) by road. Kalmykovsky is the nearest rural locality.
