= Nizhnyaya Buzinovka =

Nizhnyaya Buzinovka Нижняя Бузиновка
- Khutor
- Location within Volgograd Oblast Location within Russia
- Coordinates: 49°00′N 43°13′E
- Country: Russia
- Region: Volgograd Oblast
- District: Kletsky District
- Time zone: UTC+4:00

Nizhnyaya Buzinovka (Russian: Нижняя Бузиновка) is a rural locality (a khutor) in Verkhnebuzinovskoye Rural Settlement, Kletsky District, Volgograd Oblast, Russia. The population was 65 as of 2010.

== Geography ==
Nizhnyaya Buzinovka is located in steppe on the Liska River, 48 km southeast of Kletskaya (the district's administrative centre) by road. Verkhnyaya Buzinovka is the nearest rural locality.
