= Selivanov, Volgograd Oblast =

Selivanov Селиванов
- Khutor
- Location within Volgograd Oblast Location within Russia
- Coordinates: 49°10′N 42°59′E
- Country: Russia
- Region: Volgograd Oblast
- District: Kletsky District
- Time zone: UTC+4:00

Selivanov (Russian: Селиванов) is a rural locality (a khutor) in Zakharovskoye Rural Settlement, Kletsky District, Volgograd Oblast, Russia. The population was 227 as of 2010. There are 5 streets.

== Geography ==
Selivanov is located on the bank of the Kurtlak River, 29 km southwest of Kletskaya (the district's administrative centre) by road. Gvardeysky is the nearest rural locality.
