= Logovsky, Kletsky District, Volgograd Oblast =

Logovsky Логовский
- Khutor
- Location within Volgograd Oblast Location within Russia
- Coordinates: 49°19′N 43°15′E
- Country: Russia
- Region: Volgograd Oblast
- District: Kletsky District
- Time zone: UTC+4:00

Logovsky (Russian: Логовский) is a rural locality (a khutor) in Perekopskoye Rural Settlement, Kletsky District, Volgograd Oblast, Russia. The population was 220 as of 2010. There are 4 streets.

== Geography ==
Logovsky is located in steppe, on the Krepkaya River, 19 km east of Kletskaya (the district's administrative centre) by road. Perekopka is the nearest rural locality.
