= Platonov, Volgograd Oblast =

Platonov Платонов
- Khutor
- Location within Volgograd Oblast Location within Russia
- Coordinates: 49°11′N 43°04′E
- Country: Russia
- Region: Volgograd Oblast
- District: Kletsky District
- Time zone: UTC+4:00

Platonov (Russian: Платонов) is a rural locality (a khutor) in Perekopskoye Rural Settlement, Kletsky District, Volgograd Oblast, Russia. The population was 11 as of 2010. There are 2 streets.

== Geography ==
Platonov is located in steppe, on the Kurtlak River, 21 km south of Kletskaya (the district's administrative centre) by road. Selivanov is the nearest rural locality.
