= Malaya Osinovka =

Malaya Osinovka Малая Осиновка
- Khutor
- Location within Volgograd Oblast Location within Russia
- Coordinates: 49°07′N 42°43′E
- Country: Russia
- Region: Volgograd Oblast
- District: Kletsky District
- Time zone: UTC+4:00

Malaya Osinovka (Russian: Малая Осиновка) is a rural locality (a khutor) in Zakharovskoye Rural Settlement, Kletsky District, Volgograd Oblast, Russia. The population was 10 as of 2010.

== Geography ==
Malaya Osinovka is located on the bank of the Osinovka River, 40 km southwest of Kletskaya (the district's administrative centre) by road. Yevstratovsky is the nearest rural locality.
