= Ivanushensky =

Ivanushensky Иванушенский
- Khutor
- Location within Volgograd Oblast Location within Russia
- Coordinates: 49°13′N 42°46′E
- Country: Russia
- Region: Volgograd Oblast
- District: Kletsky District
- Time zone: UTC+4:00

Ivanushensky (Russian: Иванушенский) is a rural locality (a khutor) in Verkhnecherenskoye Rural Settlement, Kletsky District, Volgograd Oblast, Russia. The population was 77 as of 2010. There are 8 streets.

== Geography ==
Ivanushensky is located on the bank of the Kurtlak River, 25 km southwest of Kletskaya (the district's administrative centre) by road. Verkhnecherensky is the nearest rural locality.
