= Maksari =

Maksari Максари
- Khutor
- Location within Volgograd Oblast Location within Russia
- Coordinates: 49°06′N 42°38′E
- Country: Russia
- Region: Volgograd Oblast
- District: Kletsky District
- Time zone: UTC+4:00

Maksari (Russian: Максари) is a rural locality (a khutor) in Perelazovskoye Rural Settlement, Kletsky District, Volgograd Oblast, Russia. The population was 190 as of 2010. There are 4 streets.

== Geography ==
Maksari is located in steppe, on the Krepkaya River, 46 km southwest of Kletskaya (the district's administrative centre) by road. Perelazovsky is the nearest rural locality.
