= Kazachy, Volgograd Oblast =

Kazachy Казачий
- Khutor
- Location within Volgograd Oblast Location within Russia
- Coordinates: 49°08′N 42°53′E
- Country: Russia
- Region: Volgograd Oblast
- District: Kletsky District
- Time zone: UTC+4:00

Kazachy (Russian: Казачий) is a rural locality (a khutor) in Zakharovskoye Rural Settlement, Kletsky District, Volgograd Oblast, Russia. The population was 202 as of 2010. There are 4 streets.

== Geography ==
Kazachy is located on the right bank of the Don River, 27 km southwest of Kletskaya (the district's administrative centre) by road. Zakharov is the nearest rural locality.
