= Saushkin =

Saushkin Саушкин
- Khutor
- Location within Volgograd Oblast Location within Russia
- Coordinates: 49°30′N 43°34′E
- Country: Russia
- Region: Volgograd Oblast
- District: Kletsky District
- Time zone: UTC+4:00

Saushkin (Russian: Саушкин) is a rural locality (a khutor) in Kremenskoye Rural Settlement, Kletsky District, Volgograd Oblast, Russia. The population was 15 as of 2010.

== Geography ==
Saushkin is located 56 km northeast of Kletskaya (the district's administrative centre) by road. Zimovsky is the nearest rural locality.
