= Manoylin =

Manoylin Манойлин
- Khutor
- Location within Volgograd Oblast Location within Russia
- Coordinates: 49°00′N 42°54′E
- Country: Russia
- Region: Volgograd Oblast
- District: Kletsky District
- Time zone: UTC+4:00

Manoylin (Russian: Манойлин) is a rural locality (a khutor) and the administrative center of Manoylinskoye Rural Settlement, Kletsky District, Volgograd Oblast, Russia. The population was 799 as of 2010. There are 13 streets.

== Geography ==
Manoylin is located on the Krepkaya River, 44 km southwest of Kletskaya (the district's administrative centre) by road. Ternovoy is the nearest rural locality.
