= Verkhnecherensky =

Verkhnecherensky Верхнечеренский
- Khutor
- Location within Volgograd Oblast Location within Russia
- Coordinates: 49°13′N 42°40′E
- Country: Russia
- Region: Volgograd Oblast
- District: Kletsky District
- Time zone: UTC+4:00

Verkhnecherensky (Russian: Верхнечеренский) is a rural locality (a khutor) and the administrative center of Verkhnecherenskoye Rural Settlement, Kletsky District, Volgograd Oblast, Russia. The population was 881 as of 2010. There are 24 streets.

== Geography ==
Verkhnecherensky is located in steppe, on the bank of the Kurtlak River, 39 km southwest of Kletskaya (the district's administrative centre) by road. Novotsaritsynsky is the nearest rural locality.
