= Malaya Donshchinka =

Malaya Donshchinka Малая Донщинка
- Khutor
- Location within Volgograd Oblast Location within Russia
- Coordinates: 49°05′N 42°26′E
- Country: Russia
- Region: Volgograd Oblast
- District: Kletsky District
- Time zone: UTC+4:00

Malaya Donshchinka (Russian: Малая Донщинка) is a rural locality (a khutor) in Perelazovskoye Rural Settlement, Kletsky District, Volgograd Oblast, Russia. The population was 72 as of 2010. There are 3 streets.

== Geography ==
Malaya Donshchinka is located in steppe, on the Donshchinka River, 61 km southwest of Kletskaya (the district's administrative centre) by road. Bolshaya Donshchinka is the nearest rural locality.
