= Kalmykovsky =

Kalmykovsky Калмыковский
- Khutor
- Location within Volgograd Oblast Location within Russia
- Coordinates: 49°00′N 42°47′E
- Country: Russia
- Region: Volgograd Oblast
- District: Kletsky District
- Time zone: UTC+4:00

Kalmykovsky (Russian: Калмыковский) is a rural locality (a khutor) and the administrative center of Kalmykovskoye Rural Settlement, Kletsky District, Volgograd Oblast, Russia. The population was 923 as of 2010. There are 28 streets.

== Geography ==
Kalmykovsky is located in steppe, on the Krepkaya River, 44 km southwest of Kletskaya (the district's administrative centre) by road. Manoylin is the nearest rural locality.
