= 83rd Rifle Division =

Infantry division of the Red Army during World War II

The 83rd Rifle Division (Russian: 83-я стрелковая дивизия) was an infantry division of the Red Army during World War II.

== World War II ==
The 83rd began forming on 11 February 1944 from the 61st and 85th Naval Rifle Brigades as part of the 31st Rifle Corps of the 26th Army of the Karelian Front, in accordance with an order of the 26th Army from 9 February. The division included the 11th, 26th, and 46th Rifle Regiments, the 588th Artillery Regiment, and smaller support units. The 1st and 3rd Separate Rifle Battalions of the 61st Brigade were used to form the 11th Rifle Regiment, the 2nd and 3rd Separate Rifle Battalions of the 85th Brigade were used to form the 26th Rifle Regiment, and the 2nd Separate Rifle Battalion of the 61st Brigade and 1st Separate Rifle Battalion of the 85th Brigade were used to form the 46th Rifle Regiment. The 588th Artillery Regiment was formed from the two batteries of 76 mm divisional guns included in each brigade. Lieutenant Colonel Aleksey Mikhailovich Alekseyev, the commander of the 61st Brigade, became division commander.

From 14 February, the 26th Rifle Regiment defended the previous positions of the 85th Brigade to the northwest of Lake Bolshoye Severnoye, between Ozero Nizhneye and Ozero Verkhneye Chernoye, opposite the German 6th SS Mountain Division Nord, which held positions to the north of Kestenga. To the south was the 205th Rifle Division on the southern shore of Ozero Verkhneye Chernoye, while to its north there were no Soviet troops for more than a hundred kilometers. The 83rd was the northernmost unit in its corps and army. The 1st Rifle Battalion of the 46th Rifle Regiment moved up on the right flank of the 26th Rifle Regiment on 16 February. There was little action during this period, besides a near-daily mortar barrage by the 26th Rifle Regiment against the opposing German positions, sporadic exchanges of machine gun fire, and the uneventful sending out of reconnaissance patrols.

During the night of 19–20 February, the 11th relieved the 26th and the 1st Battalion of the 46th on the defensive line. On the morning of 25 February three rifle companies of the 11th advanced to a line in direct contact with the opposing German troops, 150 to 200 meters away from the positions of the latter. The advance was conducted under sporadic rifle and machine gun fire, and German artillery and mortar fire at 08:00 wounded two soldiers of the regiment. A squad of 11 riflemen and anti-tank riflemen sent out on reconnaissance in front of the advanced positions at 17:00 were cut off by a German platoon and went missing. At 21:00 on 27 February the 11th lost one killed and two wounded to German artillery fire.

On 14 November the division was awarded the Order of the Red Banner in recognition of its part in the taking of the town of Nikel and the surrounding area.

== Postwar ==
It was stationed in Murmansk with the 31st Rifle Corps from July 1945, and disbanded in 1946 as part of the Belomorsky Military District.
