= Golovsky, Uryupinsky District, Volgograd Oblast =

Golovsky Головский
- Khutor
- Location within Volgograd Oblast Location within Russia
- Coordinates: 50°33′N 41°59′E
- Country: Russia
- Region: Volgograd Oblast
- District: Uryupinsky District
- Time zone: UTC+4:00

Golovsky (Russian: Головский) is a rural locality (a khutor) in Dubovskoye Rural Settlement, Uryupinsky District, Volgograd Oblast, Russia. The population was 186 as of 2010. There are 2 streets.

== Geography ==
Golovsky is located 28 km south of Uryupinsk (the district's administrative centre) by road. Olkhovsky is the nearest rural locality.
