= Kremenskaya =

Kremenskaya Кременская
- Stanitsa
- Location within Volgograd Oblast Location within Russia
- Coordinates: 49°28′N 43°27′E
- Country: Russia
- Region: Volgograd Oblast
- District: Kletsky District
- Time zone: UTC+4:00

Kremenskaya (Russian: Кременская) is a rural locality (a stanitsa) and the administrative center of Kremenskoye Rural Settlement, Kletsky District, Volgograd Oblast, Russia. The population was 836 as of 2010. There are 19 streets.

== Geography ==
Kremenskaya is located 52 km northeast of Kletskaya (the district's administrative centre) by road. Vyezdinsky is the nearest rural locality.
