= Sirotinskaya =

Sirotinskaya Сиротинская
- Stanitsa
- Location within Volgograd Oblast Location within Russia
- Coordinates: 49°15′N 43°40′E
- Country: Russia
- Region: Volgograd Oblast
- District: Ilovlinsky District
- Time zone: UTC+4:00

Sirotinskaya (Russian: Сиротинская) is a rural locality (a stanitsa) and the administrative center of Sirotinskoye Rural Settlement, Ilovlinsky District, Volgograd Oblast, Russia. The population was 892 as of 2010. There are 20 streets.

== Geography ==
Sirotinskaya is located on the right bank of the Don River, 54 km west of Ilovlya (the district's administrative centre) by road. Beluzhino-Koldairov is the nearest rural locality.
