= Kletsky District =

Kletsky District Клетский район (Russian)
- District
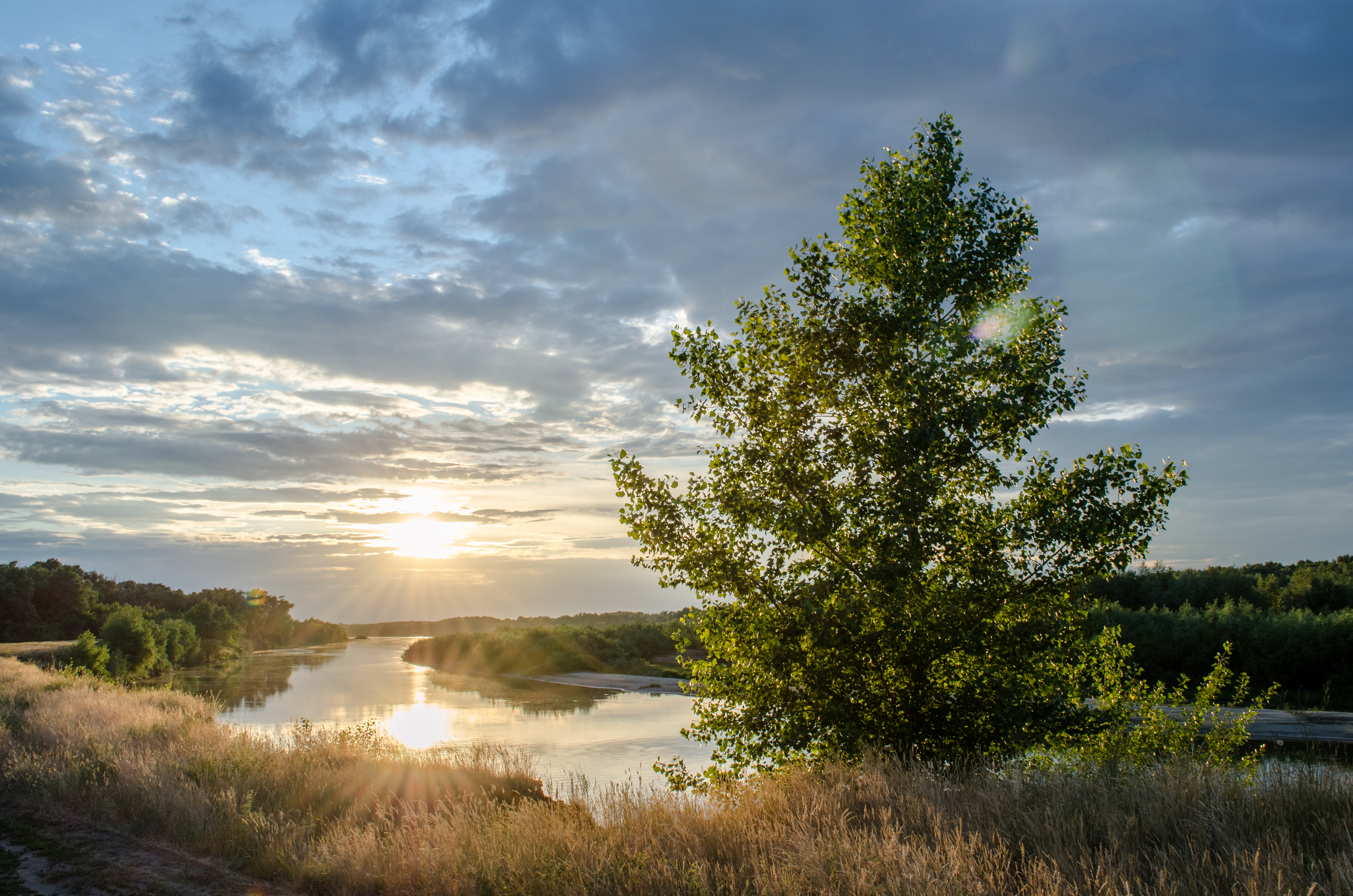
- Don River in Kletsky District

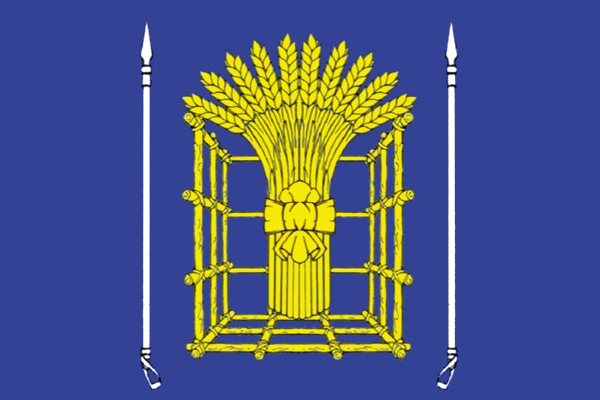
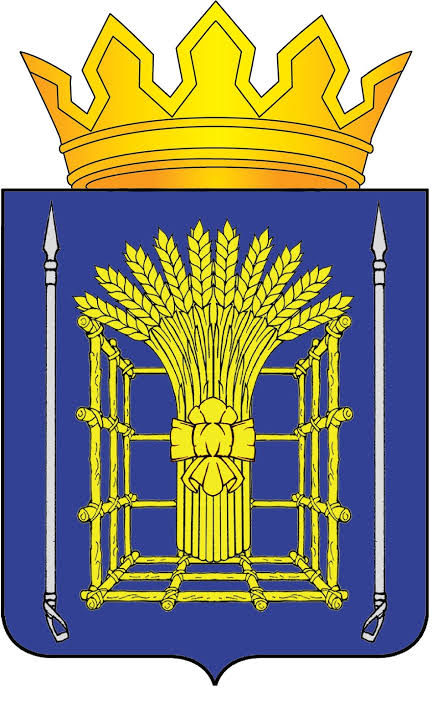
- Flag Coat of arms
- Location of Kletsky District in Volgograd Oblast
- Coordinates: 49°18′N 43°03′E
- Country: Russia
- Federal subject: Volgograd Oblast
- Established: 1928
- Administrative center: Kletskaya

Area
  - Total: 3,580 km^{2} (1,380 sq mi)

Population (2010 Census)
  - Total: 17,858
  - Density: 4.99/km^{2} (12.9/sq mi)
  - Urban: 0%
  - Rural: 100%

Administrative structure
  - Administrative divisions: 10 selsoviet
  - Inhabited localities: 42 rural localities

Municipal structure
  - Municipally incorporated as: Kletsky Municipal District
  - Municipal divisions: 0 urban settlements, 10 rural settlements
- Time zone: UTC+3 (MSK)
- OKTMO ID: 18622000
- Website: http://www.kletadmin.ru/

Kletsky District (Russian: Кле́тский райо́н) is an administrative district (raion), one of the thirty-three in Volgograd Oblast, Russia. Municipally, it is incorporated as Kletsky Municipal District. It is located in the west of the oblast. The area of the district is 3,580 square kilometers (1,380 sq mi). Its administrative center is the rural locality (a stanitsa) of Kletskaya. Population: 17,858 (2010 census); 19,541 (2002 Census); 18,412 (1989 Soviet census). The population of Kletskaya accounts for 29.8% of the district's total population.
