= Kletskaya =

Rural locality in Volgograd Oblast, Russia

Kletskaya Клетская
- (a stanitsa)
- Interactive map of Kletskaya
- Location of Kletskaya Kletskaya (Volgograd Oblast)
- Coordinates: 49°18′53″N 43°03′43″E
- Country: Russia
- Federal subject: Volgograd Oblast
- Administrative district: Kletsky District
- Founded: 1614

Population
  - Estimate (2021): 4,975 )

Municipal status
  - Municipal district: Kletsky Municipal District
- Time zone: UTC+3 (MSK)
- Postal code: 403562
- OKTMO ID: 18622418101

Kletskaya (Russian: Клетская) is a rural locality (a stanitsa) and the administrative center of Kletsky District of Volgograd Oblast, Russia. Population: 5,323 (2010 census); 5,350 (2002 census); 5,126 (1989 Soviet census).
