= LXVIII Corps =

LXVIII Corps or 68th Corps may refer to:

- 68th Corps (German Empire)
- LXVIII Army Corps (Wehrmacht), Germany
- 68th Guards Army Corps, Russia
- 68th (Lyceum Corps) Lancashire Rifle Volunteer Corps, United Kingdom

== See also ==
- List of military corps by number
- 68th Brigade (disambiguation)
- 68th Division (disambiguation)
- 68th Regiment (disambiguation)
- 68th (disambiguation)
