= 68 =

68 may refer to:

- 68 (number), the natural number following 67 and prior to 69
- One of the following years: 68 BC, AD 68, 1968, 2068
- 68 Publishers, a Czech-Canadian publishing firm
- '68 (band), an American rock band
- '68 (album), a 2013 album by Robert Wyatt
- '68 (comic book) a comic book series from Image Comics
- '68 (film), a 1988 American film
- 68 Leto, a main-belt asteroid
- Sixty-Eight (album), 2011 album by Billy Hart

== See also ==
- 68th (disambiguation)
- List of highways numbered 68
- 1968 (disambiguation)
