= 68th Rifle Division =

68th Rifle Division may refer to the following Soviet and/or Russian divisions:

- 68th Mountain Rifle Division, 1936–1946
- 68th Guards Rifle Division, 1943–1947
- 68th Rifle Division (1955–1957)
- 68th Motor Rifle Division, 1957–2003
- 68th Guards Motor Rifle Division, 2025–present

== See also ==
- 68th Division (disambiguation)
