= 1968 (disambiguation) =

1968 was a leap year starting on Monday of the Gregorian calendar.

1968 or '68 may also refer to:

- '68 (film), a 1988 American film
- 1968 (film), a 2018 Greek film
- '68 (band), an American rock band
- '68 (album), a 2013 album by Robert Wyatt
- '68 (comic book), a comic book written by Mark Kidwell
- Farm to Market Road 1968, a road in Texas
