= 68th =

68th is the ordinal form of the number 68. 68th or Sixty-eighth may also refer to:

- A fraction, 1/68, equal to one of 68 equal parts

== Geography ==
- 68th meridian east, a line of longitude
- 68th meridian west, a line of longitude
- 68th parallel north, a circle of latitude
- 68th parallel south, a circle of latitude
- 68th Street (Manhattan)

== Military ==
- 68th Army (Soviet Union)
- 68th Brigade (disambiguation)
- 68th Division (disambiguation)
- 68th Regiment (disambiguation)
- 68th Squadron (disambiguation)

== Other ==
- 68th century
- 68th century BC

== See also ==
- 68 (disambiguation)
