= 688 (disambiguation) =

688 or 688th is a number in the 600s range. It may also refer to:

== Dates ==
- 688 BCE, a year of the pre-Julian Roman calendar, in the first millennium Before the Common Era (BCE)
- 688 CE (DCVXXXVIII), a leap year starting on Wednesday of the Julian calendar, in the first millennium of the Common Era (CE)

== Places ==
- +688, the telephone country calling code for Tuvalu
- 688 Club, a former alternative music venue in Atlanta, Georgia, USA
- 688 Melanie, aa dark background asteroid from the central regions of the asteroid belt
- Area code 688, a telephone area code in Canada
- Highway 688, a list of highways numbered 688
- National Cycle Route 688, a Sustrans National Route that runs from Winterburn to Linton-on-Ouse in North Yorkshire, England, UK

== Groups, organizations ==
- 688th Aircraft Control and Warning Squadron, an inactive United States Air Force unit
- 688th Antiaircraft Battalion, 409th Rifle Division, an infantry unit of the Red Army, USSR
- 688th Cyberspace Wing, a cyberspace operations unit of the U.S. Air Force located at Kelly Field Annex, Joint Base San Antonio-Lackland, Texas, USA
- 688th Engineer Company, 420th Engineer Brigade (United States), a combat engineer brigade of the U.S. Army
- 688th Field Artillery, 112th Infantry Regiment (United States), a unit in the Pennsylvania National Guard, USA
- 688th Flying Training Squadron, an inactive unit based at Marine Corps Air Facility Walnut Ridge, Walnut Ridge, Arkansas, USA
- 688th Howitzer Artillery Regiment, 239th Rifle Division, an infantry unit of the Red Army, USSR
- 688th Motor Transport Battalion, 205th Rifle Division (Soviet Union), an infantry unit of the Red Army, USSR
- 688th Rifle Regiment, 103rd Rifle Division, an infantry unit of the Red Army, USSR
- 688th Separate Radar Company, 138th Radio Technical Brigade (Ukraine), a brigade of the Ukrainian Air Force

== Vehicles ==
- Avro Type 688 Tudor, a British piston-engined airliner
- Class 688, a class of locomotive in the Italian Ferrovie dello Stato Italiane (FS)
- Los Angeles-class submarine, a of class nuclear-powered fast attack submarines (SSN) of the U.S. Navy, also known as the 688 class
- RNLB Lord Southborough (Civil Service No. 1) (ON 688), a Watson Class motor lifeboat of the Royal National Lifeboat Institution's (RNLI) fleet
- USCGC Red Cedar (WLM-688), a U.S. Coast Guard Red-class buoy tender (1970–1999)
- USS Los Angeles (SSN-688), the lead ship of the Los Angeles class nuclear-powered fast attack submarines (SSN) of the U.S. Navy
- USS Raymon W. Herndon (DE-688), a WW II U.S. Navy Rudderow-class destroyer escort (1944–1946)
- USS Remey (DD-688), a WW II U.S. Navy Fletcher-class destroyer (1943–1963)
- USS Yacal (YFB-688), a U.S. Navy ferry (1932–1942)
- USS Zenda (SP-688), a U.S. Navy motorboat (1917–1919)

== Other uses ==
- Guantanamo captive 688, Fahmi Abdullah Ahmed, a captive of Yemeni origin at Guantanamo Bay detention camp
- London Buses route 688, a bus route from Southgate tube station to Jewish Free School (JFS) in London, England, UK
- Pakistan International Airlines Flight 688, a domestic passenger flight from Multan to Islamabad in Pakistan. Crashed on 10 July 2006
- Renault 688, an inline four-cylinder automobile engine developed and manufactured by Renault

== See also ==
- 68 (disambiguation)
- 668
- 6888
