= 68th Brigade =

68th Brigade may refer to:

== Bulgaria ==
- 68th Special Forces Brigade (Bulgaria)

== China ==
- 68th Motorized Infantry Brigade (People's Republic of China)

== Ukraine ==
- 68th Airmobile Brigade (Ukraine)
- 68th Artillery Brigade (Ukraine)

== United Kingdom ==
- 68th Anti-Aircraft Brigade
- 68th Brigade (United Kingdom), British Army infantry formation during World War I
- 68th Brigade, Royal Field Artillery, British Army unit during World War I
- 68th (North Midland) Anti-Aircraft Brigade, Royal Artillery
- 68th (South Midland) Brigade, Royal Field Artillery, British Army unit after World War I

== See also ==
- 68th Division (disambiguation)
- 68th Regiment (disambiguation)
