= 68 Squadron =

68 Squadron or 68th Squadron may refer to:

Aviation squadrons

- No. 68 Squadron RAF, a unit of the United Kingdom Royal Air Force
- 68th Fighter Squadron, a unit of the United States Air Force
- 68th Strategic Missile Squadron, a unit of the United States Air Force
- 68th Airlift Squadron, a unit of the United States Air Force
- 68th Information Operations Squadron, a unit of the United States Air Force

Ground combat squadrons

- 68 Signal Squadron, a unit of the United Kingdom Army

== See also ==
- 68th Regiment (disambiguation)
