= 69th Guards Rifle Division =

69th Guards Rifle Division (1943 – 1953)
- Russian: 69-я гвардейская Краснознамённая стрелковая дивизия
- Active: 1943–1953
- Country: Soviet Union
- Branch: Red Army (1943-1946); Soviet Army (1946-1953)
- Type: Division
- Role: Infantry
- Engagements: World War II; Belgorod-Kharkov Offensive; Battle of the Dnieper; Kirovograd Offensive; Battle of Korsun–Cherkassy; Uman–Botoșani Offensive; First Jassy-Kishinev Offensive; Second Jassy–Kishinev Offensive; Budapest Offensive; Siege of Budapest; Operation Konrad III; Operation Spring Awakening; Vienna Offensive
- Decorations: Order of the Red Banner; Guards
- Honorifics: Zvenigorodka

Commanders
- Notable commanders: Maj. Gen. Kirill Kocheevich Dzhakhua

The 69th Guards Red Banner Rifle Division (Russian: 69-я гвардейская стрелковая Краснознамённая дивизия) was a infantry division of the Soviet Ground Forces.

It was formed as an elite infantry division of the Red Army in February 1943, based on the 2nd formation of the 120th Rifle Division, and served in that role until after the end of the Great Patriotic War.

It originally served in the Stalingrad Group of Forces, mopping up in the ruins of that city after the Axis surrender there before eventually being assigned to the 21st Guards Rifle Corps of 4th Guards Army and moving north to the Kursk area in the Steppe Military District. The division would remain under these Corps and Army commands, with short exceptions, for the duration of the war. It entered combat during the Belgorod-Kharkov Offensive in August and continued fighting toward the Dnieper River and Kiev during the autumn and early winter. In early 1944 it took part in the encirclement battle at Korsun-Shevchenkivskyi and was soon rewarded with a battle honor. The 69th Guards then fought its way to the Dniester River where it took part in two offensives, the second of which in August finally took the city of Iași; this victory won the division the Order of the Red Banner. Now that Romania had been driven out of the Axis the division's combat path moved into the Balkans. The 69th Guards spent the remainder of the war fighting in Hungary and Austria; its regiments would all receive recognition for their roles in the battles for Budapest as they advanced into Austria. After the war the division remained in the Southern Group of Forces and in 1953 was converted to the 70th Guards Rifle Division.

== 1st Formation ==
The 120th was redesignated as the 69th Guards on 6 February, shortly after the German surrender at Stalingrad, and officially received its Guards banner on April 21. Once the division completed its reorganization its order of battle was as follows:

- 204th Guards Rifle Regiment (from 289th Rifle Regiment)
- 206th Guards Rifle Regiment (from 538th Rifle Regiment)
- 208th Guards Rifle Regiment (from 543rd Rifle Regiment)
- 139th Guards Artillery Regiment (from 1033rd Artillery Regiment)
- 75th Guards Antitank Battalion
- 71st Guards Reconnaissance Company
- 79th Guards Sapper Battalion
- 97th Guards Signal Battalion
- 73rd Guards Medical/Sanitation Battalion
- 70th Guards Chemical Defense (Anti-gas) Company
- 68th Guards Motor Transport Company
- 72nd Guards Field Bakery
- 67th Guards Divisional Veterinary Hospital
- 1974th Field Postal Station
- 1155th Field Office of the State Bank

Col. Kirill Kocheevich Dzhakhua, who had commanded the 120th since October 27, 1942 remained in command; he would be promoted to the rank of major general on March 1 and would lead the division for the duration of the war. The division had been in the 57th Army on February 1 but was then transferred to 21st Army and shortly after to the Stalingrad Group of Forces where it remained until March 1.

== Into Ukraine ==
After leaving the Stalingrad Group the 69th Guards was reassigned to the 24th Army in the Reserve of the Supreme High Command. In April it was subordinated to the new 21st Guards Rifle Corps along with the 68th Guards and 84th Rifle Divisions as the 24th became the 4th Guards Army within the Steppe Military District. The division remained under these commands and in roughly the same area east of the Kursk salient until early August.

Following the defeat of the German Zitadelle offensive, the 4th Guards Army, under command of Lt. Gen. G. I. Kulik and still in reserve, was concentrating in the area of Chernyanka, Orlik and Loznoe on 23 July. By 17 August the Army had been assigned to Army Gen. N. F. Vatutin's Voronezh Front and was now concentrated in the area from Yamnoye to Novaya Ryabina to Yablochnoye. As the Front pressed on towards Kharkov panzer forces of Army Group South counterattacked in the area of Akhtyrka and Vatutin received orders to eliminate this grouping to ward off the possible isolation of 27th Army. These orders were passed to the 27th, the 4th and 6th Guards and 1st Tank Armies. 4th Guards initially committed two divisions of its 20th Guards Rifle Corps to this effort and by 20 August the German riposte was brought to a halt. The Army was tasked with attacking toward Kotelva the following day; by 27 August it had reached the Vorskla River and captured Kotelva.

By 9 September the 69th Guards was advancing towards the Dniepr southwest of Zenkov in the Poltava region. A squad of 11 men of the 206th Guards Rifle Regiment, led by Jr. Lt. Museib Bagir oglu Bagirov, captured a tactically important height before being subjected to counterattacks. Armed with a sniper rifle, Bagirov was credited with killing or wounding 28 German soldiers, after which he destroyed a German artillery piece and its crew with an antitank grenade. Despite being surrounded, and in spite of his own wound, Bagirov's men held the height for more than 24 hours, knocking out three armored vehicles and inflicting up to an additional 250 casualties. On 22 February 1944 Bagirov was made a Hero of the Soviet Union. After his recovery in hospital he rejoined his regiment, fought through to the end of the war and died in 1981.

=== Battles for the Dnieper ===
On 20 September the division was recorded as having a strength of 5,048 personnel, supported by 44 guns of 76mm and 122mm calibre plus 81 medium and heavy mortars. As of 22 September Voronezh Front was attacking along three axes. On the left (south) flank the 4th Guards and 52nd Armies were advancing along a line through the Kozelshchyna Raion in the direction of Kremenchug while the Front's 3rd Guards Tank Army reached the Dniepr at Zarubintsy. 4th Guards also reached the river on 28 September but had to temporarily go over to the defense on the east bank. In a STAVKA directive (No. 30203) issued the next day the 52nd and 4th Guards Armies were transferred to Steppe Front to the south.

On 6 October the 69th Guards began its crossing operations in the Svitlovodsk area near Kirovograd. One of the first men over was Guardsman Mikhail Stepanovich Tsyganov, 4th Company, 2nd Battalion of the 208th Guards Rifle Regiment. His unit first had to capture a defended nameless island near the west bank; after helping to secure the German trenches Tsyganov forded the river channel and carried a red flag through heavy small arms and artillery fire before planting it on a small hill just inland, inspiring the comrades of his company to follow his example. On 22 February 1944 Krasnoarmeets Tsyganov would be made a Hero of the Soviet Union. Postwar he worked in several responsible positions until his health forced him to retire in 1955 but he lived until 2001. During the same crossing operation Cpt. Vasilii Alekseevich Zhukov, commander of a battalion of the 204th Guards Rifle Regiment, led his men in the assault on the unnamed island and cleared it before continuing to the west bank. In the battles for the bridgehead that followed over the next days Zhukov led several counterattacks which resulted in the destruction of 10 German armored vehicles and up to one-and-a-half battalions of infantry. This officer also became a Hero of the Soviet Union on 22 February. In peacetime he worked in mechanical engineering before he died in 1957.

Following these crossing operations the 20th and 21st Guards Corps remained holding a bridgehead northwest of Kremenchug facing the German 320th Infantry Division but it was not given any priority for expansion and in fact on 18 October the 8th Guards Airborne and 80th Guards Rifle Divisions were removed from 4th Guards Army and moved south, leaving the Army with just three divisions under command and the 69th Guards alone in 21st Guards Corps; this situation continued into December. On 20 October Steppe Front was renamed 2nd Ukrainian. Meanwhile, during mid-October the center armies of the Front had driven south from bridgeheads farther to the southeast, liberated Pyatikhatka, and continued as far as Krivoi Rog, although they were forced to fall back from the latter. This advance allowed the 4th Guards Army to substantially expand its bridgehead between Kremenchug and Cherkassy. By 20 November, the 2nd and 3rd Ukrainian Fronts were involved in a joint offensive along the Kirovograd axis.

=== Korsun–Cherkassy Pocket ===
On this date the 1st Panzer Army reported that its infantry strength had fallen to the lowest tolerable level and Cherkassy was threatened with encirclement. The fighting through the first three weeks of December was largely attritional in nature but around the middle of the month the German line north of Krivoi Rog gave way and soon 2nd Ukrainian Front had cleared the west bank of the Dniepr north to Cherkassy. By 1 January 1944 the 4th Guards Army had been restored to a strength of five divisions and the 21st Guards Corps had the 69th Guards and the 138th Rifle Division under command. The Kirovograd Offensive began on January 5 and involved four armies, although the 4th Guards was in a secondary role, and the city was liberated three days later. The advance to the northwest continued until 16 January by which time the German XI and XXXXII Army Corps, holding the last sector of the Dniepr line, were deeply enveloped. On 25 January the 4th Guards Army, which was still rebuilding in strength, plunged into the front of the German 8th Army southwest of Cherkassy and was helping set the stage for a classic double envelopment in conjunction with two mobile corps of 6th Tank Army attacking from the north. On the afternoon of 28 January the encirclement was closed in conjunction with forces of 1st Ukrainian Front, 56,000 German troops were trapped, and the 69th Guards helped form the inner ring of the encircling forces. Before the German relief attempt began on 4 February, as the Army was establishing an outer ring of encirclement, the division was awarded an honorific:

ZVENIGORODKA... 69th Guards Rifle Division (Major General Dzhakhua, Kirill Kocheevich)... The troops who participated in the liberation of Zvenigorodka and nearby towns, by the order of the Supreme High Command of 3 February 1944, and a commendation in Moscow, are given a salute of 20 artillery salvoes from 224 guns.

The fighting for the Korsun–Cherkassy pocket continued until 16 February by which time about 30,000 German troops had managed to escape, roughly half of those originally encircled.

== Battles on the Dniestr ==
Following this victory the division pressed on westward during the Uman–Botoșani Offensive with its 21st Guards Corps, commanded by Maj. Gen. P. I. Fomenko, which now consisted of the 69th, 78th and 80th Guards Rifle Divisions. The leading 78th Guards arrived at the Dniestr River near the villages of Zhura and Mikhailovka, 13 km northeast of Susleni, late on 2 April. At dawn the next day this division assaulted across the river, leading to a three-day battle with forward elements of the 3rd Panzer Division defending security outposts in the Bulaeshty region, 6–8 km north of Susleni; the 78th was soon joined by the 69th and 80th Guards in this fighting. It wasn't until midday on 5 April that the Corps' forces were able to drive the panzer troops back to their Susleni strongpoint. Meanwhile, the five divisions of the 20th Guards Corps attacked towards Orhei and Chișinău but gained only 3–5 km against stiffening German resistance from the XXXX and XXXXVII Panzer Corps. The history of 4th Guards Army described the difficulties during its advance:

Overcoming the increasing enemy resistance became more difficult because our forces had inadequate artillery support and ammunition. Of the army's 700 guns no more than 200 of them were in their firing positions. The remainder lagged behind... No less difficult was the process of supplying ammunition to the artillery... We used every conceivable means of transport, including carrying the shells forward by hand.

Despite the many daunting problems caused by the spring rasputitsa, on 5 April the Army commander, Lt. Gen. I. V. Galanin, resumed the offensive. Four divisions of 20th Guards Corps assaulted the defenses of the 13th and 3rd Panzer Divisions west and north of Orhei but made only modest gains in heavy fighting. The next day the 5th Guards Airborne and 41st Guards managed to seize the city but the arrival of the 11th Panzer Division halted any further advance. Marshal I. S. Konev, the Front commander, was determined to take Chișinău and on 8 April Galanin ordered his two Guards corps to assault and crush the positions of 3rd Panzer south of Susleni. Over two days the German defenses were pounded by artillery and mortar fire and repeated ground assaults but XXXX Panzer Corps threw in reserves to stabilise the situation. On 10 and 11 April, Galanin reinforced the see-saw battle for the Orhei bridgehead with the 69th and 80th Guards but his move was met by the 14th Panzer Division which joined the German counterattacks. Overnight on 12 and 13 April, most of the Panzer Corps withdrew south of the Reut River where the 69th Guards already held a bridgehead and its Corps-mates soon linked up to expand this lodgment to about 11 km in width and as much as 5 km in depth. But by now the 4th Guards Army was so depleted from months of fighting that it was no longer capable of offensive operations; the 69th Guards, like the Army's other divisions, was down to roughly 5,000 personnel. On 18 April, Konev authorized Galanin to go over to the defense.

=== Second Jassy-Kishinev Offensive ===
Prior to the start of the August offensive that forced Romania out of the Axis the 21st Guards Corps was transferred to the 52nd Army, still in 2nd Ukrainian Front. The Corps deployed on a 3 km-wide assault front with the 69th and 62nd Guards Rifle Divisions in the first echelon and the 254th Rifle Division in second. The Corps had a total of 915 guns and mortars in support, with 488 (including 82mm mortars) backing the 69th. The Army's front lines were roughly 16 km due north of Iași. The 18th Tank Corps was in the Army's reserve and was expected to enter the breach in the Axis lines once the Bahlui River was reached.

Following an artillery preparation which lasted an hour and 40 minutes the offensive began on the morning of 20 August. The 52nd Army broke through the Axis defense along a 12 km front, advancing 16 km during the day, forcing the Bahlui in the process and ending the day fighting along the northern outskirts of Iași in the area of the railway station. The main efforts of the defenders were to prevent a breakthrough to the city but the 21st Guards Corps was able to reach a line from south of Kozjacka Nou to Munteni, facing south. The following day the 73rd Rifle Corps was to capture Iași while the 21st Guards Corps paved the way for the 18th Tank Corps. It then attacked along the southern bank of the Bahlui and by the end of the day reached a line from Mogoșești to Ciurea; at this time the 69th Guards was in the Corps' second echelon. During 22 August, the 18th Tanks broke into the clear and advanced more than 50 km towards Huși, which eased the way for the 62nd Guards and 254th Divisions to reach from Rediul to Cuiaba. On the same day Iași was liberated and on September 15 the division would be awarded the Order of the Red Banner for its role in the battle.

Overnight the Axis forces in the Iași area attempted to withdraw to a new line along the left bank of the Deia River but were unsuccessful due to the pace of the 52nd Army's advance. On 23 August the Army advanced significantly, pushing aside small enemy rearguards and mopping up units that had been scattered by 18th Tanks. By the end of the day the 21st Guards Corps, with the 69th Guards still in second echelon, had pushed south of Vaslui to Bahnari to east of Solești. The following day the Army continued to develop the offensive and the Corps encountered only insignificant resistance, reaching a line from Vutcani to Hurdugi.

By now the 2nd and 3rd Ukrainian Fronts had jointly encircled the Axis Chișinău group of forces, most of which was east of the Prut River. The plan for this group of about 70,000 personnel was to force the Prut in the Huși area and then to break through to reach Hungarian territory. The task of preventing this and destroying the Axis forces in the Huși area fell to the 52nd Army. On 24 August, the 21st Guards Corps was directed to occupy a line from Berezeni to Stănilești by the morning of the next day which gave each first echelon division a 14 km-wide frontage to cover. By the end of 25 August the 69th Guards had extended its front from the 62nd Guards' left flank to the Prut at a right angle to the latter. In the process of the advance on 24 August the cities of Huși, Bacău, Bârlad and Roman were all occupied and on 15 September each of the regiments of the division would be decorated in consequence. The 206th Guards Rifle Regiment received the Order of the Red Banner, the 208th Guards Rifle Regiment and the 139th Guards Artillery Regiment each won the Order of Kutuzov, 3rd Degree, and the 204th Guards Rifle Regiment was recognized with the Order of Alexander Nevsky.

The German XXXXIV, XXX and LII Army Corps planned to start their breakout at midnight on 24 and 25 August in the general direction of Huși. Command and control had broken down in the encircled grouping and the escape efforts were widely scattered; heavy equipment was being abandoned or destroyed at the Prut. The withdrawal continued into the next night as the three Corps split into separate combat groups while the 21st Guards Corps reached a line from Murgeni to Fălciu to Berezeni and joined hands with the 3rd Ukrainian Front while part of its forces turned north to combat German forces in woods southwest of Huși. On 27 August the Corps beat off German attacks south and southwest of Hurdugi while continuing to hold defensive positions along the Prut. From this date until 5 September the 52nd Army was involved in completing the elimination of the Chișinău group. During the afternoon of the 28th a significant group of German troops managed to push south on a road to Vutcani despite resistance from 21st Guards Corps and consequent heavy losses. Remnants of five German divisions which had managed to break through to Vutcani began a withdrawal through the rear areas of 2nd Ukrainian Front on 29 August with 21st Guards Corps in pursuit as far as the Bârlad River. The German objective now was to cross the Siret River, and broke up into small detachments for the purpose. The total strength of these detachments was roughly 10,000 men, but between 1–4 September these were eliminated before they could cross the Trotuș River.

During this operation Cpt. Pyotr Georgievich Korochkin, commander of the 3rd Battalion of the 139th Guards Artillery Regiment, became a Hero of the Soviet Union. At the start on 20 August, as the rifle troops came under heavy Axis artillery and mortar fire, Korochkin deployed two of his batteries for direct fire and suppressed these guns, paving the way for the capture of a dominant height. On 28 August, during heavy fighting with German troops attempting to break out of the encirclement his guns ran out of ammunition. Korochkin organized his gunners for hand-to-hand combat which restored their positions; in the course of this he personally accounted for 18 German troops killed or wounded but was then killed himself. On 24 March 1945 Captain Korochkin would be posthumously awarded the Gold Star.

== Into the Balkans ==
At the start of October the 69th Guards, with the remainder of 21st Guards Corps, had returned to 4th Guards Army, which was in the Reserve of the Supreme High Command for rebuilding as the 2nd and 3rd Ukrainian Fronts advanced into Romania and Hungary. When the Army returned to the fighting in the third week of November it joined the latter Front in the area where the 57th Army had recently forced a crossing of the Danube near Mohács. On 29 November, Axis resistance in the crossing area was effectively crushed and the 62nd and 69th Guards moved to the west bank in the wake of the 41st Guards and were ready to enter the fighting the next day.

As of 19 December the Front had completed its preparations for the third stage of its operation to encircle and eliminate the German-Hungarian Budapest group of forces. 4th Guards Army occupied a 44 km line from Lake Velence to Lake Balaton with 21st Guards Corps along the Army's secondary axis. By 26 December the Hungarian capital had been encircled, the remaining Axis forces had been forced back up to 40 km from the city, and the 4th Guards Army, along with the 5th Guards Cavalry Corps, had created an external front covering the siege from the west and had captured several strongpoints on the approaches to Székesfehérvár and Kisfalud; the 69th Guards had been ordered to detach from the Corps the previous day and move to the area of the former city. By the end of 4 December, Guards Army had Székesfehérvár surrounded on three sides before going over to the defense. At this time the 21st Guards Corps was facing the Hungarian 25th Infantry Division, the 44th Training Regiment and the 85th Landing Battalion.

=== Battles for Budapest ===
Before dawn on January 2 the IV SS Panzer Corps began Operation Konrad I in an attempt to relieve Budapest. The German forces attacked from the direction of Tata and 4th Guards Army took emergency measures to shore up its right flank; among these the 69th Guards extended its frontage to free up the 62nd Guards to move into reserve in the Székesfehérvár area. The Army's commander, Army Gen. G. F. Zakharov, was determined to halt the German drive northwest of Bicske. By 6 January, the division had been reassigned to the 135th Rifle Corps but continued to hold its previous positions. In the event this phase of the offensive was halted on the same day by the 31st Guards Rifle Corps.

The second phase of Operation Konrad began on 7 January as the German command shifted the 23rd Panzer Division northwest of Székesfehérvár along with the rest of the III Panzer Corps. It was soon apparent that the immediate goal of the offensive was Bicske with an additional threat along the axis to Zámoly. The 135th Corps (69th Guards, 252nd Rifle Division and 1st Guards Fortified Region) defended along the Army's left flank. Overnight on 7 and 8 January, the 69th Guards' sector was relieved by units of the 252nd and 1st Guards and pulled back into Army reserve in the Székesfehérvár area to organize the defense of the city from the north. This phase of the offensive was brought to a halt a few days later. The third phase began on 18 January and the Army's main concern became the defense of Székesfehérvár; the division had by now returned to 21st Guards Corps, forming its second echelon behind the 41st Guards and 84th Rifle Divisions and was one of the few reserves available to Zakharov as the offensive opened.

IV SS Panzer Corps planned to launch its assault along a 15 km front held by the 252nd Division's 928th Rifle Regiment and the entire sector of 1st Guards Fortified Region with a total of 560 tanks. Despite an hour-long artillery preparation and air support the first German attacks were beaten back. Eventually the 1st Guard's defenses were overcome and Ősi and Sandorka were captured. By day's end the panzers had advanced from 16 to 30 km. The 69th Guards occupied defensive positions along the western and southern outskirts of Székesfehérvár. Overnight General Zakharov reorganized his defense, ordered the bridges over the Sárvíz Canal blown, and assigned the division to the direct defense of the town. At dawn the 5th SS Panzer Division Wiking and 3rd SS Panzer Division Totenkopf forced the canal and continued to develop their offensive to the east, striving to reach the Danube. The advance made little further progress that day and the battle for Székesfehérvár continued through January 20 as Soviet artillery was brought up to reinforce the antitank defenses. The two SS divisions focused their efforts that day and the next on the reinforced 5th Guards Cavalry Corps between Lake Velence and the Danube but without notable success.

The German plan for 22 January involved a short artillery preparation at 0530 hours after which the 5th SS and 1st Panzer Divisions attacked towards Székesfehérvár with the former advancing on the eastern suburbs while the latter headed for the western outskirts. Elements of the 23rd Panzer Division also attacked towards the town from the direction of Sárkeresztes. Under the circumstances of near-encirclement the impact of more than 150 tanks and assault guns managed to force the 21st Guards Corps back and to capture the town and its suburbs by 1800 hours. The next day the IV SS Panzer Corps again concentrated its attacks on 5th Guards Cavalry Corps intending to finally break through to Budapest although by now it was running very low on fuel. Overnight on 25 and 26 January, the German forces launched a surprise night offensive which made some gains and put 4th Guards Army in a difficult situation. Zakharov reacted by, among other measures, shifting one rifle regiment of the 69th Guards to the area south of Vereb, occupying defensive positions along the Gyula sector; this regiment was reinforced with artillery and a small number of tanks and self-propelled guns. Meanwhile, the Front managed to concentrate sufficient reserves to bring Konrad to a halt on 27 January.

Apart from a handful that managed to break out the remaining Axis troops in the city were forced to surrender on 13 February. On 5 April, the 139th Guards Artillery Regiment would be awarded the Order of Suvorov, 3rd Degree, for its part in this victory. Following the defeat of the German Operation Spring Awakening in March the 21st Guards Corps went over to the offensive with the remainder of 4th Guards Army. Crossing the border into Austria on 1 April, the division captured the town of Eisenstadt and shortly after entered Vienna where it ended the war.

== Postwar ==
At the time of the German surrender the men and women of the division held the full official title of 69th Guards Rifle, Zvenigorodka, Order of the Red Banner Division. (Russian: 69-я гвардейская стрелковая Звенигородская Краснознамённая дивизия.) After the war it underwent several reorganizations in the Southern Group of forces before finally becoming the 70th Guards Motor Rifle Division in 1953.
