= 68th Division =

In military terms, 68th Division or 68th Infantry Division may refer to:

== Infantry divisions ==
- 68th Division (1st Formation) (People's Republic of China), 1949–1952
- 68th Infantry Division (France)
- 68th Infantry Division (Wehrmacht)
- 68th Division (Imperial Japanese Army)
- 68th Infantry Division (Russian Empire)
- 68th Guards Motor Rifle Division, Soviet Union
- 68th Guards Rifle Division, Soviet Union
- 68th Mechanized Division, Soviet Union
- 68th Motor Rifle Division, Soviet Union, earlier the 68th Rifle Division
- 68th Mountain Rifle Division, Soviet Union
- 68th (2nd Welsh) Division, United Kingdom
- 68th Infantry Division (United States), planned but never formed during WWII

== Other divisions ==
- 68th Anti-Aircraft Artillery Division, Soviet Union

== See also ==
- List of military divisions by number
- 68th Brigade (disambiguation)
- 68th Regiment (disambiguation)
- 68th Squadron (disambiguation)
