= 23rd Army (People's Republic of China) =

- Active: 1949
- Disbanded: 2003
- Country: People's Republic of China
- Branch: Army
- Engagements: Korean War

The 23rd Army was an army of the Chinese People's Liberation Army, active from 1949.

The army originally consisted of the 67th, 68th Division, and 69th Divisions. However, the 68th Division was disestablished in August 1952.

It was active during the Korean War. The People's Republic had planned to rotate all troops in Korea by the end of 1953, and the Chinese Central Military Commission authorized the 23rd, 24th and 46th Corps to replace 20th, 27th and 42nd Corps by September 1952.

In Korea, under Commander Zhong Guochu, with Commissar Lu Sheng, it was assigned to east coast defence duties with the 67th, 69th and 73rd Divisions assigned.

It was one of the eight armies identified by the U.S. Central Intelligence Agency as being active in the Shenyang Military Region as of 15 March 1967.

Dennis Blasko's 2002 RAND chapter identified it in the Shenyang MR with its headquarters in Harbin. He stated that it included the 69th Motorised Infantry Division/Brigade at Harbin, another motorized infantry brigade, and armored, artillery, and anti-aircraft brigades.

The army was disbanded in a cycle of reductions that began in 2003. Two units which were resubordinated directly to the Shenyang MR headquarters were the 68th Motorized Infantry Brigade, Qiqihar, Heilongjiang, and the 69th Motorized Infantry Division, Harbin, Heilongjiang.
