= 152nd Jaeger Brigade =

Ukrainian Ground Forces unit

- 152 окрема єгерська бригада 152 okrema jehersʹka bryhada
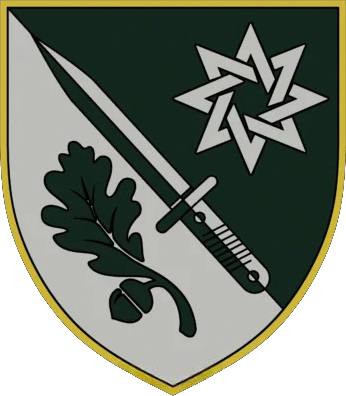
- Active: September 13, 2023 – present
- Country: Ukraine
- Allegiance: Armed Forces of Ukraine
- Branch: Ukrainian Ground Forces
- Type: Jäger
- Size: Brigade
- Part of: Operational Command North: 21st Army Corps
- Nickname: Symon Petliura-Brigade
- Patron: Symon Petliura
- Motto: There shall be no fear in us!
- Engagements: Russo-Ukrainian war; Russian invasion of Ukraine; Pokrovsk offensive
- Decorations: For Courage and Bravery
- Website: Official Facebook page

Commanders
- Current commander: Colonel Valeriy Lys

Insignia
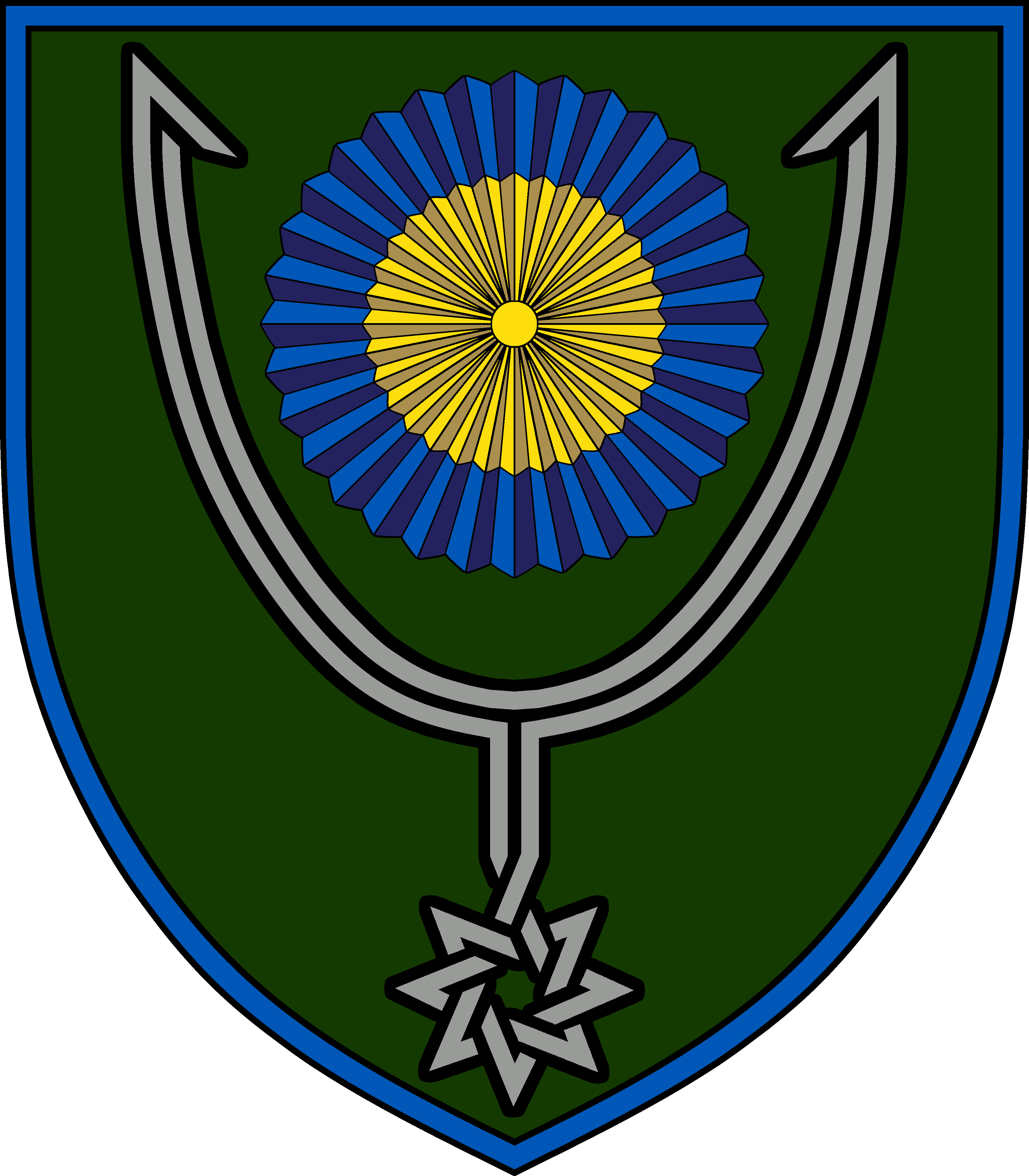
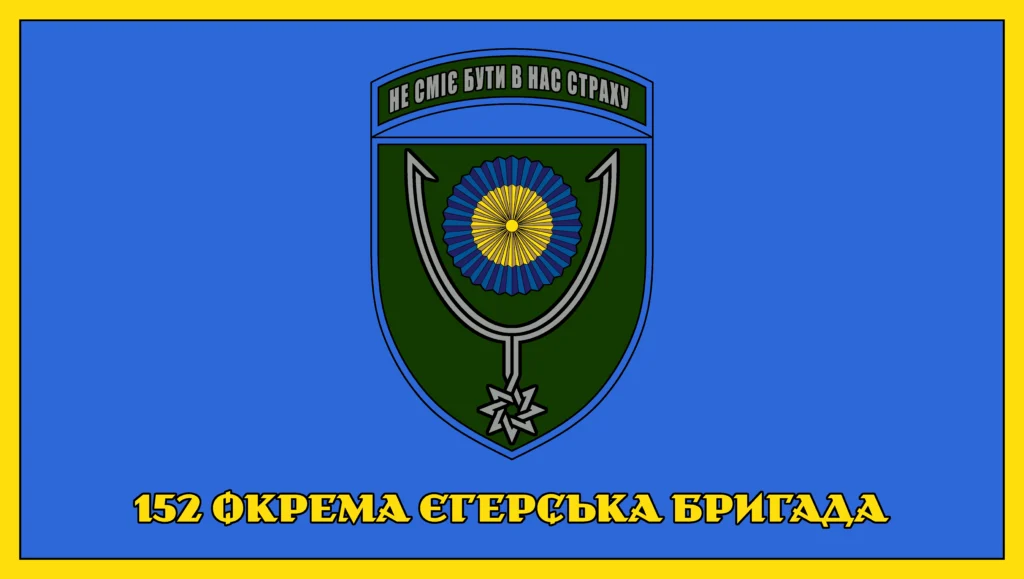
- Former insignia and flag (2023–2025)

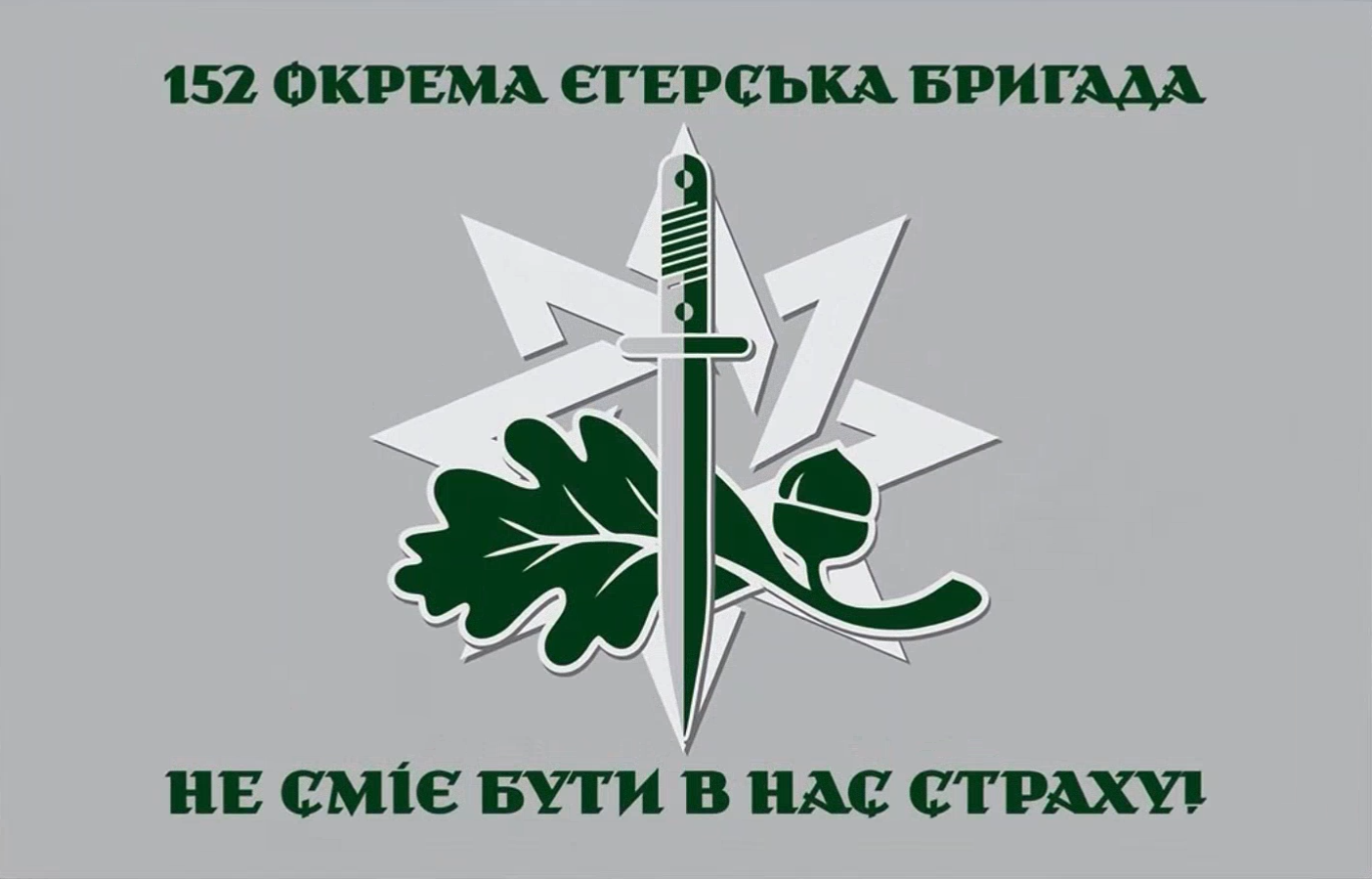
- Flag in grey

The 152nd Jaeger Brigade named after Symon Petliura (Ukrainian: 152 окрема єгерська бригада імені Симона Петлюри, romanized: 152 okrema jehersʹka bryhada imeni Simona Petlyuri), is a one of ten light infantry brigades formation of the Ukrainian Ground Forces formed in 2023. It was part of the creation of four other brigades to expand the Ukrainian Ground Forces in response to the 2022 Russian Invasion of Ukraine and is expected to participate in a potential Ukrainian counteroffensive in 2024.

On 16 August 2024, the brigade was repurposed as a Jaeger brigade, becoming the fourth brigade of its kind to exist in the Ukrainian Armed Forces.

== History ==
=== Formation ===
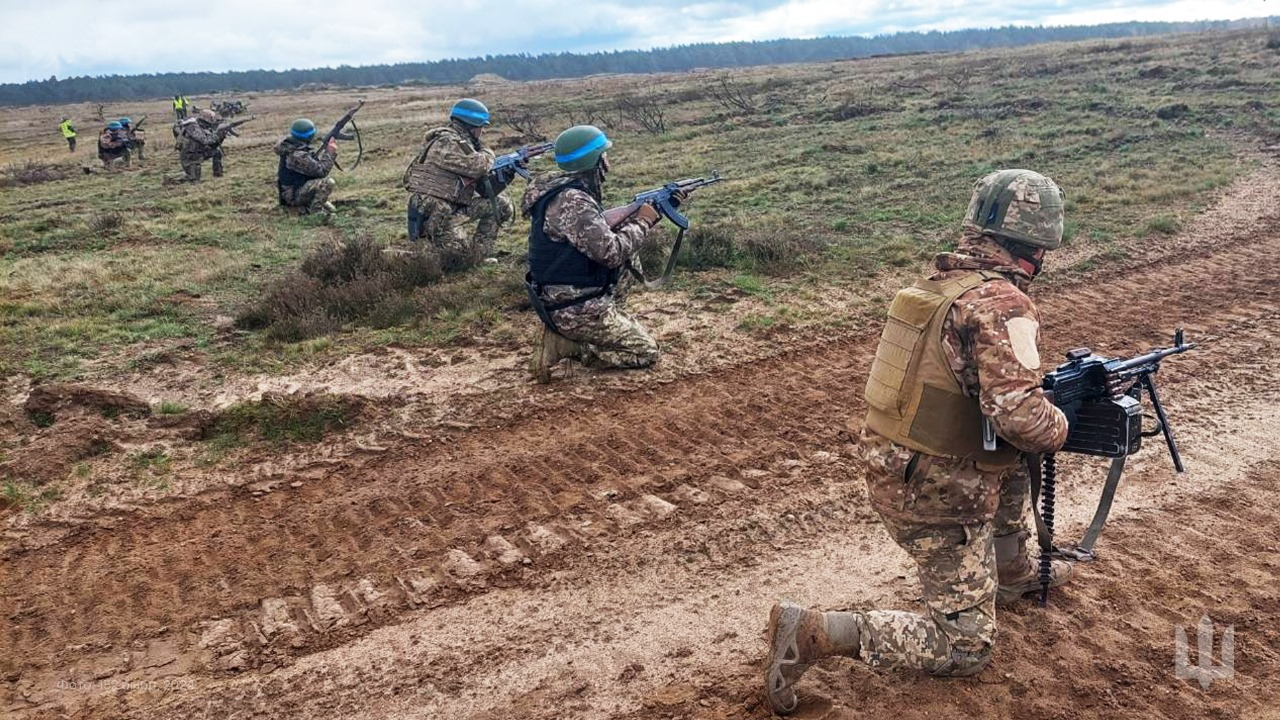
The brigade on exercise, May 2024.

The brigade was announced in mid-October 2023, alongside the creation of five new mechanized brigades as part of the Ukrainian Ground Forces, accounting for a five percent expansion of the Ground Forces.

The brigade reportedly drew its cadre of experienced officers and non-commissioned officers from existing brigades that have already served on the frontline in Ukraine. It was also mentioned that the brigade's strength will be filled with 2,000 new recruits. The brigade's purpose was expected to help participate in a Ukrainian counteroffensive in 2024, or possibly against a Russian offensive.

According to Forbes, it is unclear where the brigade will receive its equipment that makes them a mechanized brigade; rather than a glorified infantry or motorized brigade. It was noted that the new brigades may not receive new, modern vehicles but would have to make do with old, vulnerable, Soviet-era equipment. This is evident by the brigade's large amount of BMP-1s in its inventory, lacking heavy vehicles such as tanks and other armoured fighting vehicles; and also using smaller light tactical vehicles such as the MRAP in order to provide mobility for its infantry, commonly seen amongst Ukrainian Jaeger brigades.

=== Russian invasion of Ukraine ===
The brigade was reported to have been formed in anticipation of a potential Ukrainian counteroffensive in 2024, as well as to bolster Ukrainian defenses in eastern Ukraine, and to relieve depleted units. However, the brigade's best soldiers were reportedly broken up and dispatched across the front in Ukraine. Additionally, the 152nd Jaeger Brigade was sent to storm enemy frontline positions. As a result, about 500 soldiers were reported to have gone missing in action in 3 days. The brigade was later sent to the Pokrovsk front, aiding other Ukrainian units in the defense of their positions. The 152nd Jaeger Brigade suffered significant casualties due to lack of trained personnel and equipment.

=== Reforms ===
The 152nd Mechanized Brigade (Ukrainian: 152 окрема механізована бригада, romanized: 152 okrema mekhanizovana bryhada) became a jaeger brigade on 16 August 2024. After this, the unit became officially known as the 152nd Jaeger Brigade (Ukrainian: 152 окрема єгерська бригада, romanized: 152 okrema jehersʹka bryhada), making the brigade the fourth unit of its kind to exist within the Ukrainian Armed Forces, alongside the 13th, 68th, and 71st brigades.

In an article by Forbes, it was reported that Jaeger brigades in the Ukrainian Armed Forces are middleweight infantry. It was mentioned that the brigade is not light enough to be considered an infantry brigade, as they lack tracked vehicles; however, it also is not heavy enough to be regarded as a mechanized brigade due to the fact that they have hundreds of tanks and other fighting vehicles in their arsenal.

On 6 December 2025 President Volodymyr Zelenskyy awarded the unit the honorary name Symon Petliura.

On 26 May 2026 the unit received the honorary award For Courage and Bravery by President Volodymyr Zelenskyy.

== Equipment ==
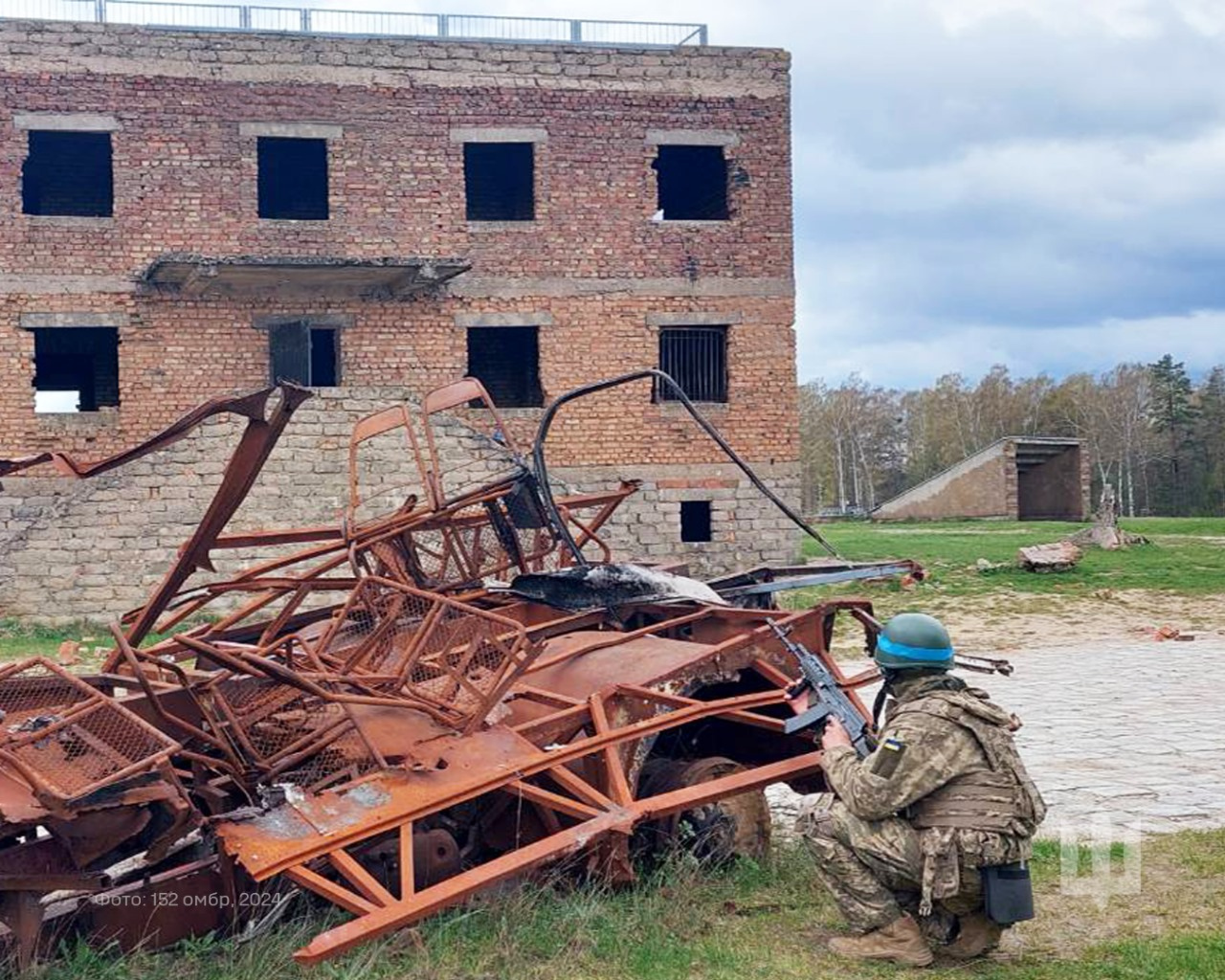
An infantrymen during urban combat training, May 2024.

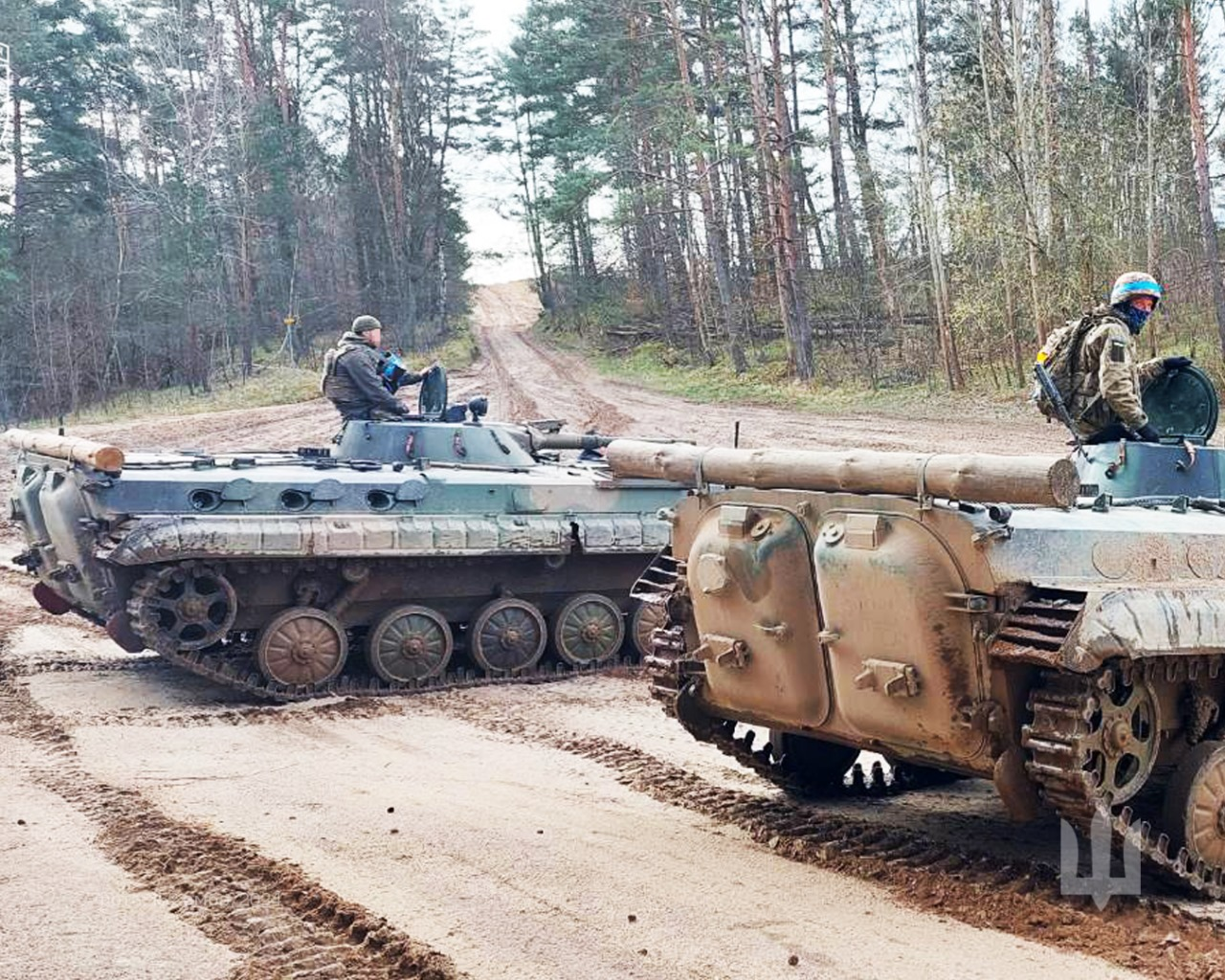
Former Polish BMP-1 vehicles belonging to the brigade, May 2024.

=== Small arms ===
Similarly to other brigades formed in the same expansion, the brigade is armed with a variety of small arms. The unit primarily uses older models of the Kalashnikov rifle series, including the AKM, and in limited numbers, the AK-74. These rifles have seen various improvements amongst some users, such as better handguards, fitted with foregrips, alongside Western styled butt-stocks to improve accuracy for the user. The unit also use other small arms, including the PKM general-purpose machine gun. Additionally, other publications of the brigade using grenade launchers such as the RPG-7 have been seen alongside mechanized troops.

As of August 2024, the brigade utilizes the following small arms:

- AKM – Soviet/Russian assault rifle
- AK-74 – Soviet/Russian assault rifle
- PKM – Soviet/Russian general-purpose machine gun
- RPG-7 – Soviet/Russian anti-tank, rocket launcher

=== Vehicles ===
The brigade lacks many heavy vehicles such as tanks, unlike other brigades such as the 150th Mechanized Brigade, and the 154th Mechanized Brigade, two other brigades created alongside the unit in the late 2023 expansion. The unit only have been seen to use a small quantity of infantry fighting vehicles such as the BMP-1, with the brigade having approximately 5+ at their disposal.

After being redesignated as a Jaeger brigade on 16 August 2024, the brigade was seen with several MRAP vehicles belonging to the 1st Jaeger Battalion.

As of 16 August 2024, the brigade operates the following vehicles:

- BMP-1 – Soviet amphibious tracked infantry fighting vehicle
- MRAP – American light tactical vehicle

== Structure ==
As of August 2024, the structure of the brigade is as follows:

- 152nd Jaeger Brigade
  - Brigade’s Headquarters
  - 1st Jaeger Battalion
  - 2nd Jaeger Battalion
  - 3rd Jaeger Battalion
  - Reconnaissance Company
  - Artillery Group
  - Anti-Aircraft Defense Battalion
  - Engineer Battalion
  - Logistic Battalion
  - Signal Company
  - Maintenance Battalion
  - Radar Company
  - Medical Company
  - Chemical, biological, radiological and nuclear defence Protection Company
  - Unmanned Systems Battalion "11:11"
