= Shony Alex Braun =

Hungarian Jewish violinist (1924–2002)

Shony Alex Braun (born Sándor Braun; Cristuru-Secuiesc, Romania, July 14, 1924– Los Angeles, California, October 4, 2002) was a Romanian-born Hungarian Jewish violinist, Holocaust survivor, classical composer and actor. He played bit parts in the TV shows Perry Mason, WKRP in Cincinnati and the film '68. He died of pneumonia on October 4, 2002, aged 78.

== Early life ==
Sándor Braun, nicknamed "Sanyi" or "Shony", was fourth of six children. He was also known by his Hebrew name, Yitzhak. He was a violin prodigy. He and his family were sent to the Auschwitz concentration camp. He was moved to several camps and ended up in Dachau, where he would regularly play the violin for SS officers in exchange for extra food rations.

After the Holocaust he married Shari Mendelovitz, also a Holocaust survivor, and resumed his violin studies. He emigrated to the United States in 1950. He composed the "Symphony of the Holocaust" and performed it with a live orchestra in 1992 in Dayton, Ohio. He recorded 11 albums of continental and Gypsy music. Many of the compositions were his original works.
