= 21st Army Corps (Ukraine) =

Ukrainian Ground Forces formation

- 21-й армійський корпус
- Active: 2025 – present
- Country: Ukraine
- Allegiance: Armed Forces of Ukraine
- Branch: Ukrainian Ground Forces
- Type: Mechanized Infantry
- Size: Corps
- Part of: Operational Command North
- Garrison/HQ: Pryluky, Chernihiv Oblast
- Mottos: Audaces Fortuna Juvat (Latin); Fortune Favors the Brave
- Engagements: Russo-Ukrainian War
- Website: Official Facebook page

Commanders
- Current commander: Brig. Gen. Valerii Kurach

The 21st Army Corps (MUN A5160) is a Corps of the Ukrainian Ground Forces.

== History ==
The 21st Army Corps is a military unit formed as part of Ukraine's ongoing defense reforms. These reforms aim to improve command structures and operational readiness amid ongoing conflicts.

== Structure ==
As of 2025 the corps structure is as follows:

- XXI Army Corps
  - Corps Headquarters
    - Management
    - Commandant Platoon
  - 4th Heavy Mechanized Brigade
  - 9th Recon Battalion
  - 68th Artillery Brigade
  - 93rd Mechanized Brigade
  - 102nd Anti-Tank Battalion
  - 144th Material Support Battalion
  - 152nd Jaeger Brigade
  - 155th Mechanized Brigade
  - 159th Mechanized Brigade
  - 167th Communications Battalion
  - 433rd Unmanned Systems Battalion
  - 520th Repair and Restoration Battalion
  - 531st Security Battalion
