= 688 Melanie =

Main-belt asteroid

Discovery
- Discovered by: J. Palisa
- Discovery site: Vienna Obs.
- Discovery date: 25 August 1909

Designations
- Named after: unknown
- Alternative designations: A909 QC · 1927 SR; 1940 SJ · A917 KD; 1909 HH
- Minor planet category: main-belt · (middle) background

Orbital characteristics
- Epoch 31 May 2020 (JD 2459000.5)
- Uncertainty parameter 0
- Observation arc: 106.92 yr (39,054 d)
- Aphelion: 3.0733 AU
- Perihelion: 2.3217 AU
- Semi-major axis: 2.6975 AU
- Eccentricity: 0.1393
- Orbital period (sidereal): 4.43 yr (1,618 d)
- Mean anomaly: 20.621°
- Mean motion: 0° 13^{m} 21^{s} / day
- Inclination: 10.244°
- Longitude of ascending node: 170.84°
- Argument of perihelion: 138.97°

Physical characteristics
- Mean diameter: 41.40±3.1 km; 41.614±0.228 km; 49.12±0.60 km
- Synodic rotation period: 18.87±0.01 h
- Geometric albedo: 0.045±0.001; 0.0599±0.010; 0.068±0.005
- Spectral type: SMASS = C; B–V = 0.760±0.030
- Absolute magnitude (H): 10.59; 10.8

688 Melanie (prov. designation: A909 QC or 1909 HH) is a dark background asteroid from the central regions of the asteroid belt. It was discovered by Austrian astronomer Johann Palisa at the Vienna Observatory on 25 August 1909. The carbonaceous C-type asteroid has a rotation period of 18.9 hours and measures approximately 42 kilometers (26 miles) in diameter. Any reference to the origin of the asteroid's name is unknown.

== Orbit and classification ==
Melanie is a non-family asteroid of the main belt's background population when applying the hierarchical clustering method to its proper orbital elements. It orbits the Sun in the central asteroid belt at a distance of 2.3–3.1 AU once every 4 years and 5 months (1,618 days; semi-major axis of 2.7 AU). Its orbit has an eccentricity of 0.14 and an inclination of 10° with respect to the ecliptic. The body's observation arc begins at Vienna Observatory in July 1913, or four years after its official discovery observation.

== Naming ==
This minor planet was named in 1910, by Otto Prelinger who collaborated with Johann Palisa and Max Wolf on the photographic star charts (AN 186, 15). Any reference of this minor planet's name to a person or occurrence is unknown.

=== Unknown meaning ===
Among the many thousands of named minor planets, Melanie is one of 120 asteroids for which no naming citation has been published. All of these asteroids with an unknown meaning have low numbers, beginning with 164 Eva and ending with 1514 Ricouxa, all discovered between 1876 and the 1930s, predominantly by astronomers Auguste Charlois, Johann Palisa, Max Wolf and Karl Reinmuth.

== Physical characteristics ==
In both the Bus-DeMeo classification and the Bus–Binzel SMASS classification, Melanie is a common, carbonaceous C-type asteroid.

=== Rotation period ===
In September 2011, a rotational lightcurve of Melanie was obtained from photometric observations by Robert Stephens at the Santana Observatory (646) in California. Lightcurve analysis gave a well-defined rotation period of 18.87±0.01 hours with a low brightness variation of 0.14±0.01 magnitude (U=3). The first but unsuccessful attempt to measure the objects period was undertaken by Richard Binzel in June 1984. Other observations by French amateur astronomers Laurent Bernasconi (2005) and René Roy (2011) gave a period of (20±0.4) and (19.97) hours and an amplitude of 0.07±0.01 and 0.08 magnitude, respectively (U=2−/2−). Also in 2011, an ambiguous period of (16.10±0.05) with an alternative period solution of 16.10 hours and an amplitude of (0.09±0.01) magnitude was determined (U=2).

=== Diameter and albedo ===
According to the surveys carried out by the Infrared Astronomical Satellite IRAS, the NEOWISE mission of NASA's Wide-field Infrared Survey Explorer (WISE), and the Japanese Akari satellite, Melanie measures (41.40±3.1), (41.614±0.228) and (49.12±0.60) kilometers in diameter and its surface has an albedo of (0.0599±0.010), (0.068±0.005) and (0.045±0.001), respectively.

The Collaborative Asteroid Lightcurve Link adopts the albedo obtained by IRAS and derives a diameter of 41.38 kilometers using an absolute magnitude of 10.59. Alternative mean-diameters published by the WISE team include (19.17±2.54 km), (38.832±0.280 km), (40.088±11.29 km), (41.54±13.73 km) and (43.864±0.198 km) with a corresponding albedo of (0.22±0.05), (0.068±0.005), (0.0538±0.0347), (0.05±0.03) and (0.0533±0.0107). On 4 August 2002, an asteroid occultation gave a best-fit ellipse dimension of (41.0 km × 41.0 km) with a low quality rating of 0. These timed observations are taken when the asteroid passes in front of a distant star.
