= 68th Motorized Infantry Brigade =

73rd Division (1949–53) 73rd Infantry Division (1953–60) 73rd Army Division (1960-65) Independent Division of Heilongjiang Provincial Military District (1965-66) 1st Independent Division of Heilongjiang Provincial Military District (1966-68) 73rd Army Division (1968-69) 69th Army Division (1969-85) 68th Infantry Division (1985-98) 68th Motorized Infantry Brigade (1998-2011) 68th Mechanized Infantry Brigade (2011-17) 68th Combined Arms Brigade (2017-)
- Active: 1949.2 -
- Country: People's Republic of China
- Branch: People's Liberation Army Ground Force, People's Volunteer Army
- Type: Mechanized Infantry
- Size: Brigade
- Part of: 78th Group Army
- Garrison/HQ: Qiqihar, Heilongjiang
- Engagements: Chinese Civil War, Korean War, Sino-Soviet Border Conflict

Commanders
- Notable commanders: Leng Pengfei

The 73rd Division (Chinese: 第73师) was created in February 1949 under the Regulation of the Redesignations of All Organizations and Units of the Army, issued by Central Military Commission on November 1, 1948, basing on the 19th Division, 7th Column of the Huadong Field Army. Its history can be traced to the Riverine Detachment of 7th Division, New Fourth Army, formed in February 1943.

The division was part of the 25th Corps. Under the flag of the 73rd Division, it was engaged in several major battles in the Chinese Civil War, including the Menglianggu Campaign, Huaihai Campaign, and Shanghai Campaign.

In July 1952, the division was transferred to 23rd Corps and was deployed into Korea in September.

In October 1952, Artillery Regiment was activated, which was later redesignated as 349th Artillery Regiment from 1953.

The division pulled out from North Korea in March 1958. By then the division was composed of:

- 217th Regiment
- 218th Regiment
- 219th Regiment
- 349th Artillery Regiment

From 1960 the division was renamed as 73rd Army Division(Chinese: 陆军第73师).

In April 1965 the division was reorganized into Independent Division of Heilongjiang Provincial Military District(Chinese: 黑龙江省军区独立师):

- 217th Regiment was renamed as 1st Regiment;
- 218th Regiment was renamed as 2nd Regiment;
- 219th Regiment was renamed as 3rd Regiment;
- 4th Regiment was activated;
- 349th Artillery Regiment was detached and returned to 23rd Army Corps' direct control.

In July 1966, the division was renamed as 1st Independent Division of Heilongjiang Provincial Military District(Chinese: 黑龙江省军区独立第1师) following the activation of 2nd Independent Division of Heilongjiang Provincial Military District.

In February 1968 the division was returned to 23rd Army Corps control and reconstituted as 73rd Army Division again:

- 1st Regiment was renamed as 217th Regiment;
- 2nd Regiment was renamed as 218th Regiment;
- 3rd Regiment was renamed as 219th Regiment;
- 4th Regiment was disbanded;
- 349th Artillery Regiment rejoined the division.

On March 2, 1969, 1st Battalion, 217th Regiment, 73rd Division participated in the Zhenbao Island Incident under the command of Leng Pengfei, during which it ambushed a patrol group from 57th Imanskiy Border Guard Ussuriyskiy Detachment, Soviet Border Troops. The 217th Regiment also engaged in the clash on March 15 with Soviet Border Troops and a detachment from 135th Motorised Rifle Division.

In June 1969, 349th Artillery Regiment was renamed as Artillery Regiment, 73rd Army Division.

In December 1969, the division was renamed as 68th Army Division(Chinese: 陆军第68师). All its infantry regiments were redesignated:

- 217th Regiment was renamed as 202nd Regiment;
- 218th Regiment was renamed as 203rd Regiment;
- 219th Regiment was renamed as 204th Regiment.

In 1985, the division was renamed as 68th Infantry Division(Chinese: 步兵第68师) and reconstituted as a northern infantry division, category B. By then the division was composed of:

- 202nd Regiment
- 203rd Regiment
- 204th Regiment
- Artillery Regiment

In August 1998, the division was reduced and redesignated as 68th Motorized Infantry Brigade(Chinese: 摩托化步兵第68旅).

In 2003, the brigade was transferred to 16th Army following 23rd Army's disbandment.

In 2011, the brigade was reconstituted as 68th Mechanized Infantry Brigade(Chinese: 机械化步兵第68旅).

In April 2017, the brigade was reconstituted as 68th Heavy Combined Arms Brigade(Chinese: 重型合成第68旅).

The brigade now serves as a maneuver part of PLA 78th Group Army, stationing in Qiqihar, Heilongjiang.
