= 68th Artillery Brigade (Ukraine) =

Ukrainian Ground Forces unit

- 68-та артилерійська бригада
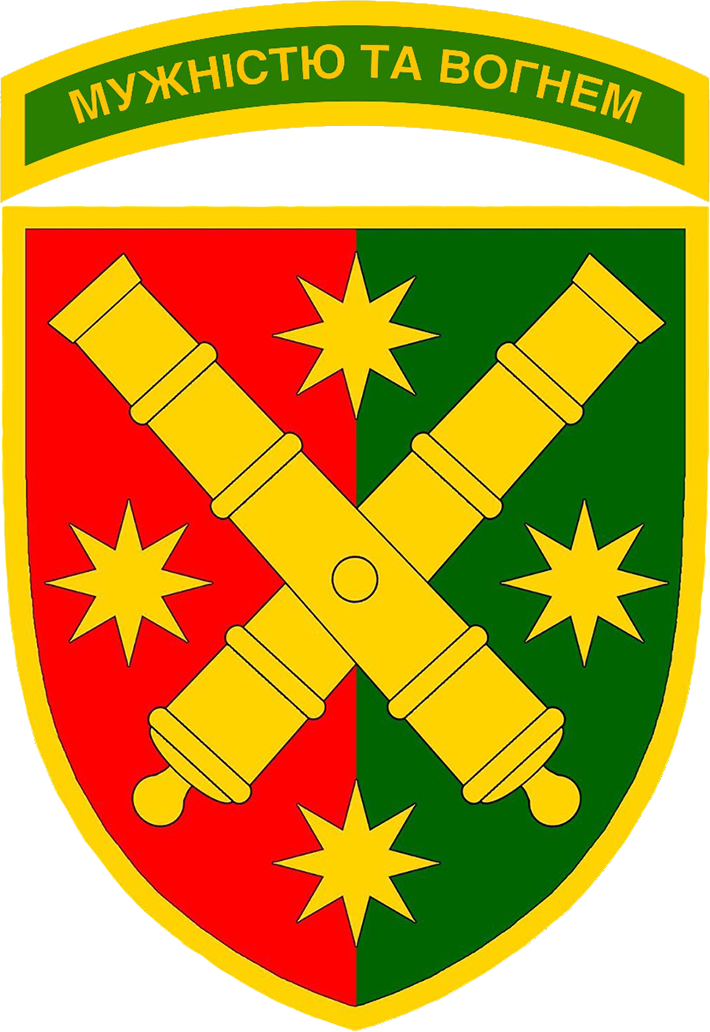
- Active: 2025 – present
- Country: Ukraine
- Allegiance: Armed Forces of Ukraine
- Branch: Ukrainian Ground Forces
- Type: Rocket and Artillery Forces
- Role: Artillery
- Size: Brigade
- Part of: Operational Command North: 21st Army Corps
- Garrison/HQ: Berdychiv, Zhytomyr Oblast
- Mottos: With Courage and Fire
- Engagements: Russo-Ukrainian War: Full scale invasion
- Website: Official Facebook page

Insignia
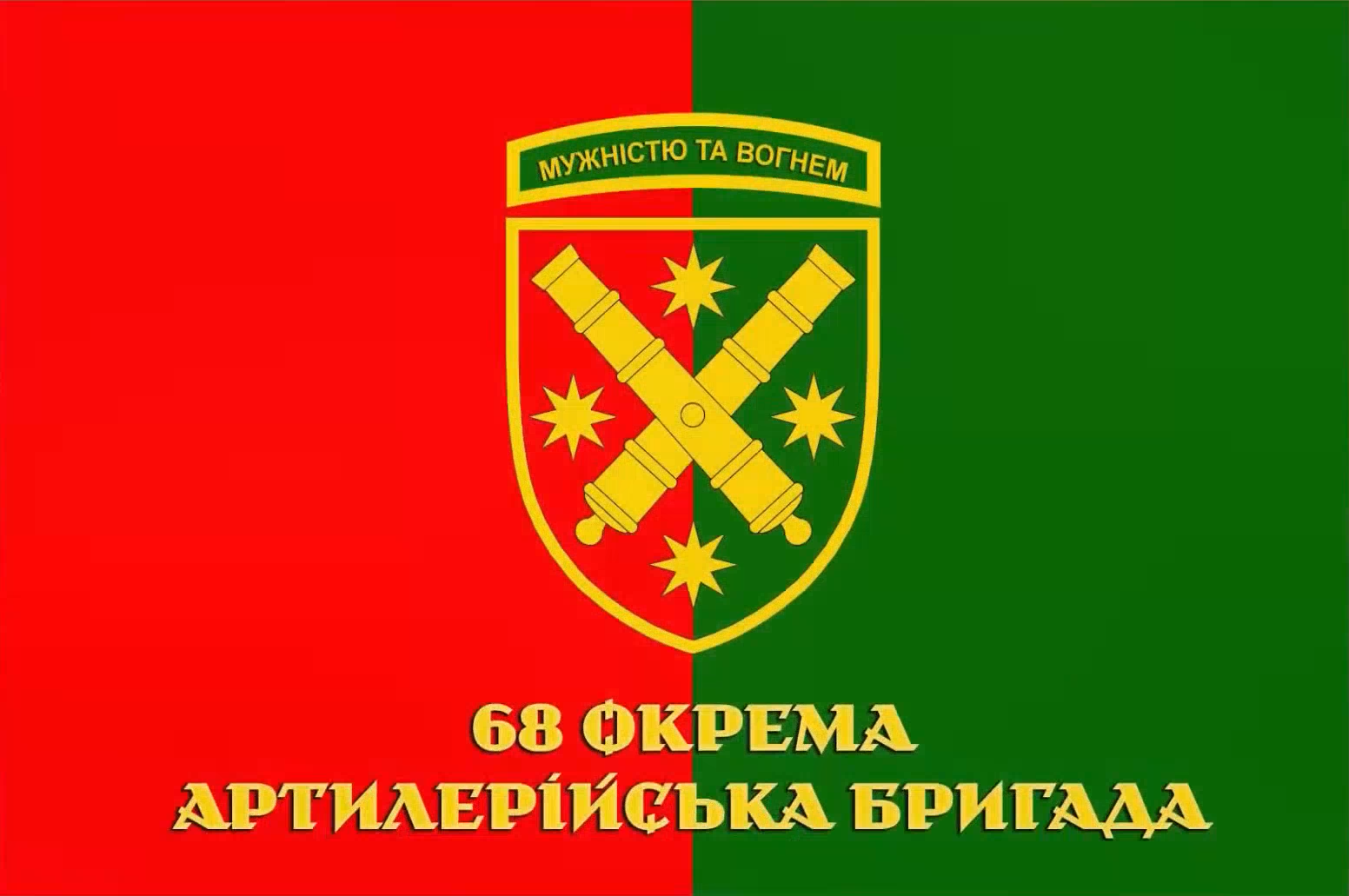
- Flag

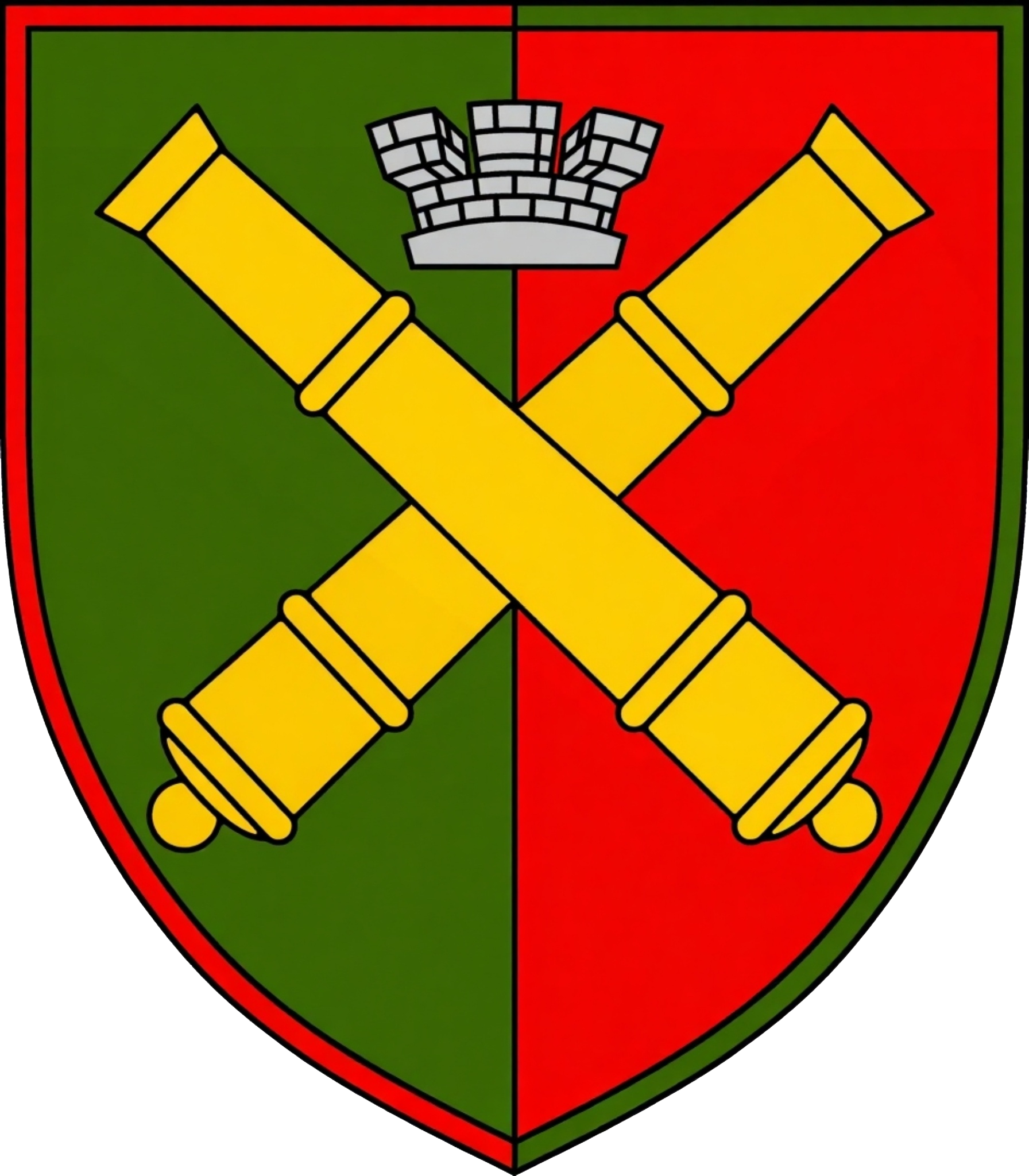
- Former insignia

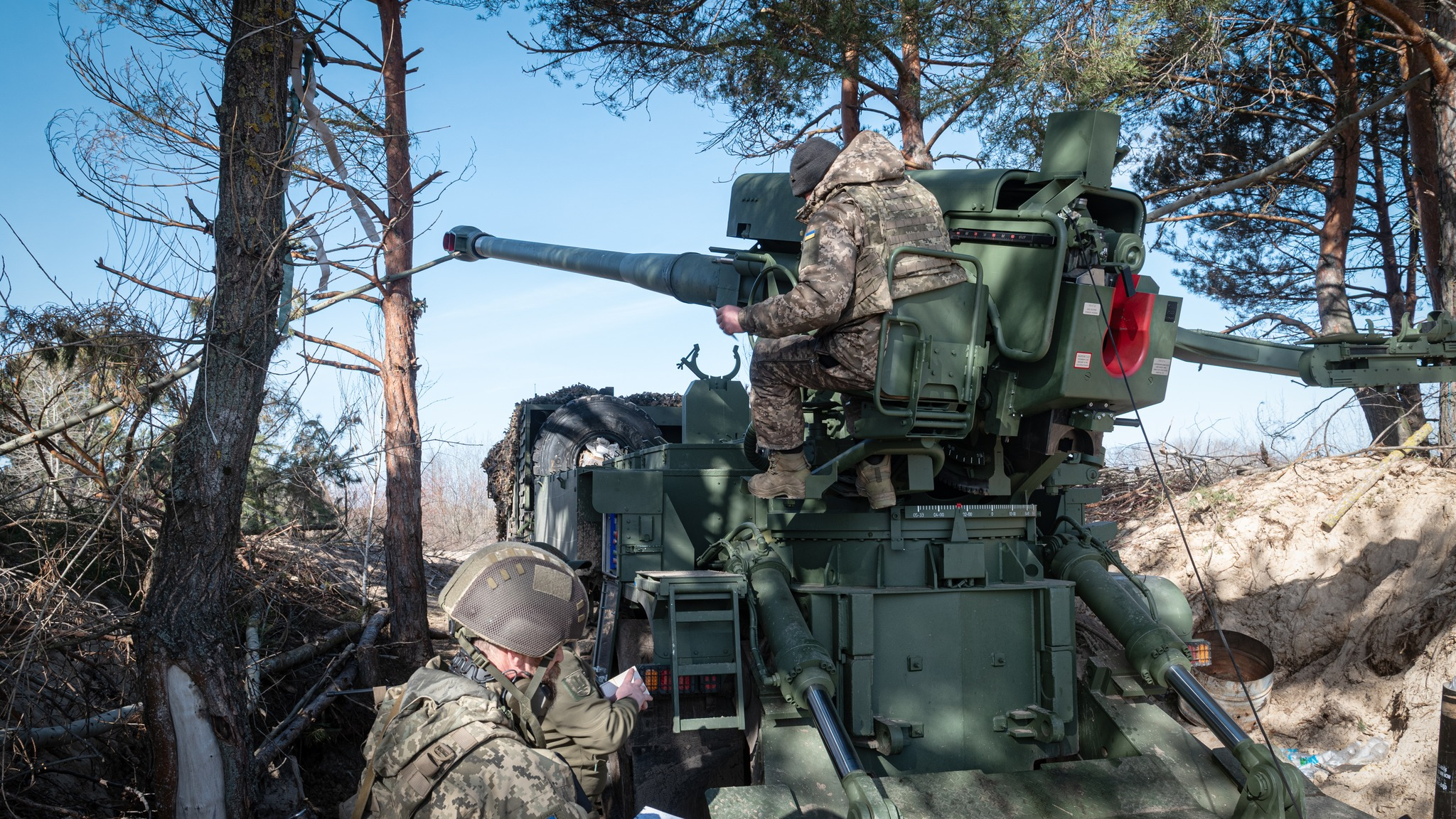
2S22 Bohdana 5.0 of the brigade during training

The 68th Artillery Brigade (Ukrainian: 68-та окрема артилерійська бригада) is a brigade of the Ukrainian Ground Forces.

== History ==
The 68th Artillery Brigade is a military unit of the Ground Forces, and currently under the command of Command of the Ground Forces. The unit is based in Berdychiv, Zhytomyr Oblast.

== Structure ==
As of 2025, the brigade's structure was as following:

68th Artillery Brigade
  - Headquarters & Headquarters Company
  - 1st Artillery divizion
  - 2nd Artillery divizion
  - 3rd Artillery divizion
  - 4th Artillery divizion
  - Artillery Reconnaissance divizion
  - Anti tank divizion
  - Engineer Company
  - Maintenance Company
  - Logistic Company
  - Signal Company
  - Radar Company
  - Medical Company
  - CBRN Protection Company
