= 68th Airmobile Brigade =

Ukrainian Ground Forces unit

- 68-ма окрема аеромобільна бригада "імені Олекси Довбуша"
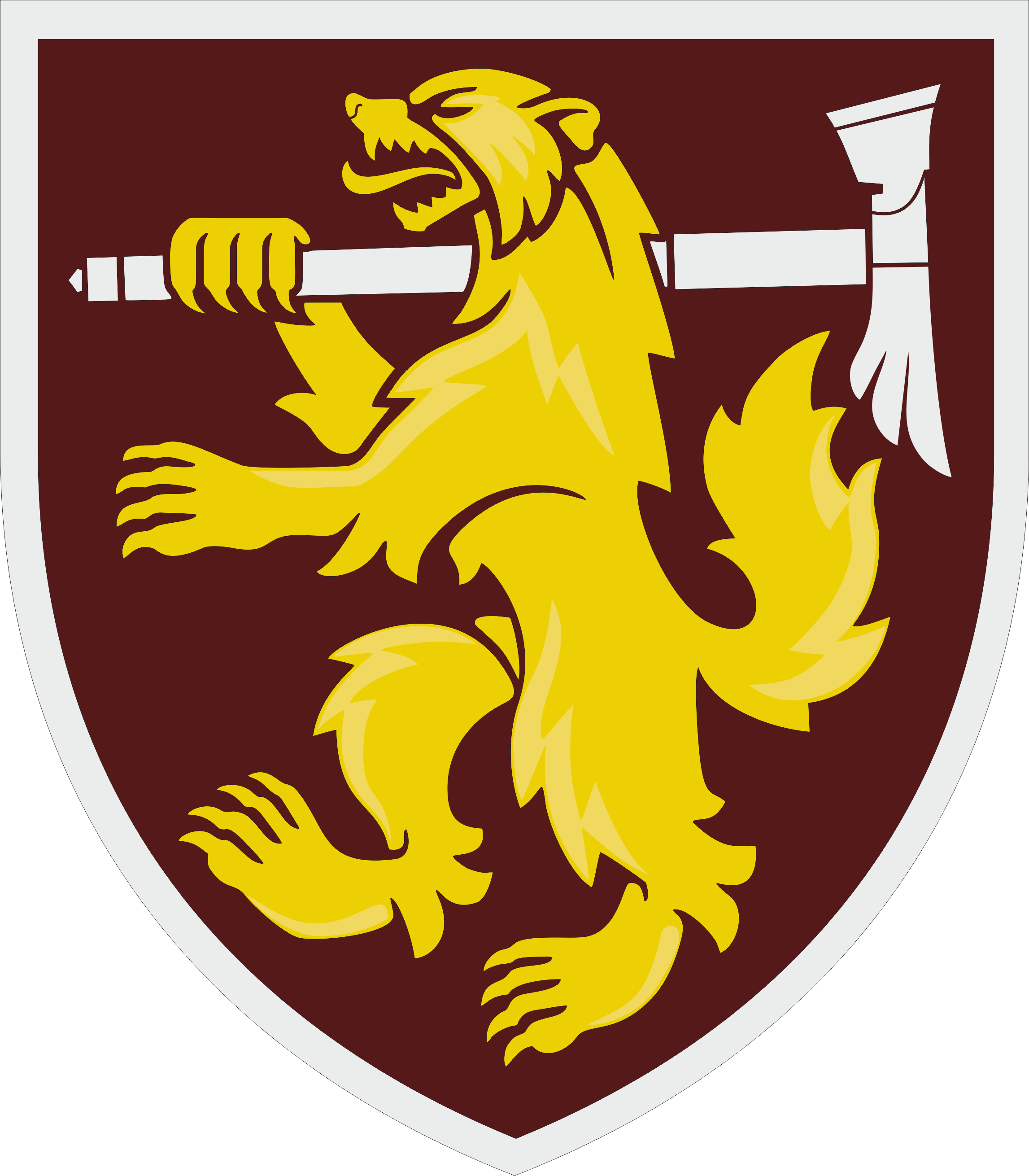
- Active: 6 March 2022
- Country: Ukraine
- Allegiance: Armed Forces of Ukraine
- Branch: Ukrainian Air Assault Forces
- Type: Brigade
- Role: Airmobile infantry
- Part of: 8th Air Assault Corps
- Garrison/HQ: Rivne, Rivne Oblast
- Nickname: named after Oleksa Dovbush
- Patron: Oleksa Dovbush
- Motto: Your Souls for Our Grievances
- Engagements: Russo-Ukrainian war: Full scale invasion; Battle of Vuhledar; 2023 Ukrainian counteroffensive; Pokrovsk front
- Decorations: For Courage and Bravery
- Website: Official Facebook page

Commanders
- Current commander: Semen Sykolov
- Notable commanders: Serhii Tretiak

The 68th Separate Airmobile Brigade named after Oleksa Dovbush is a brigade of the Ukrainian Ground Forces.

== History ==
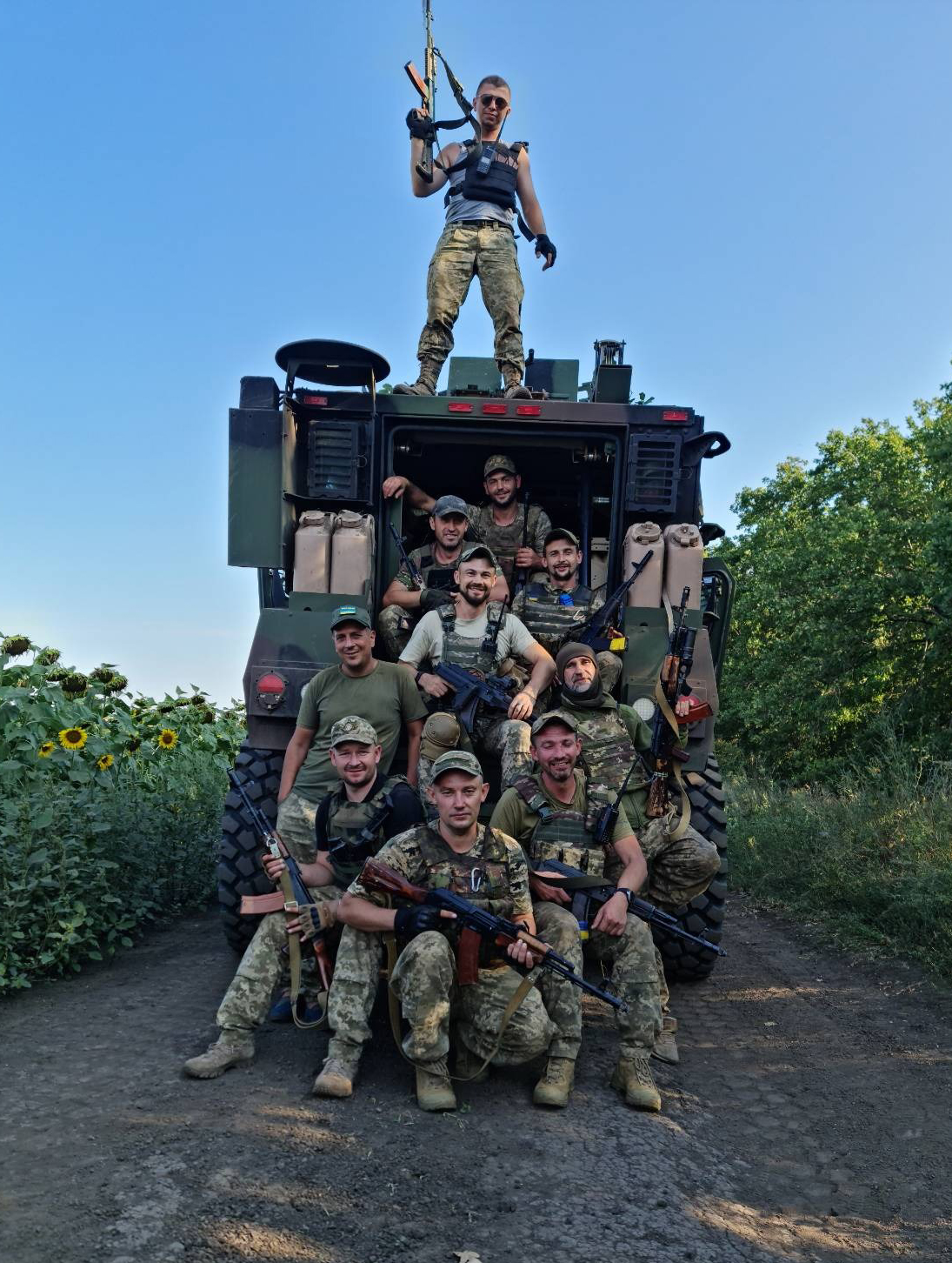
Soldiers of the 68th Jaeger Brigade with a MaxxPro MRAP

The brigade's units are designed to conduct combat operations in forest and swampy areas, and are staffed by military personnel with experience in combat operations or with civilian activities related to the specifics of the brigade.

On 11 June 2023, as part of a Ukrainian counteroffensive, in cooperation with other units, the 68th Brigade took control of the village of Blahodatne.

In August 2023, Volodymyr Zelenskyy said the brigade was engaged in combat on the Lyman front.

=== Pokrovsk (2024–present) ===
By June 2024, it was reported that the brigade was operating on the Pokrovsk front. In September of the same year, the brigade was still defending the Pokrovsk front. It had fought to defend the town of Novohrodivka, but had ultimately lost it, and had suffered "a lot of losses", according to a commander. Elements of the 68th Brigade remained on the Pokrovsk front as of May 2025.

On 12 December 2025 the unit was awarded the Presidential Award For Courage and Bravery by the President of Ukraine Volodymyr Zelenskyy.

In early 2026 the unit was restructured and transferred from the Ground Forces to the Ukrainian Air Assault Forces, being renamed from 68th Jaeger Brigade and becoming the 68th Airmobile Brigade.

== Structure ==
- 68th Separate Airmobile Brigade
  - Headquarters & Headquarters Company
  - 1st Mechanized Infantry Battalion
  - 2nd Mechanized Infantry Battalion
  - 3rd Mechanized Infantry Battalion
  - 26th Rifle Infantry Battalion
  - 52nd Rifle Infantry Battalion
  - 68th Tank Battalion
  - 68th Field Artillery Regiment
    - Headquarters and Target Acquisition Battery
  - Anti-Aircraft Defense Artillery Battalion
  - Attack Drone Company "Hornets of Dovbush"
  - Reconnaissance Company
  - Combat Engineer Battalion
  - Logistic Battalion
  - Signal Company
  - Maintenance Battalion
  - Radar Company
  - Medical Company
  - Chemical, Biological, Radiological and Nuclear Protection Company
  - Brigade Band
