= 68th Corps (German Empire) =

68th Corps (Generalkommando zbV 68)
- Flag of the Staff of a Generalkommando (1871–1918)
- Active: March 1918-1919
- Disbanded: 1919
- Country: German Empire
- Branch: Army
- Engagements: World War I

Insignia
- Abbreviation: Genkdo zbV 68

The 68th Corps (German: Generalkommando zbV 68) was a corps formation of the German Army in World War I. It was formed in March 1918 and was still in existence at the end of the war.

== Chronicle ==
The 68th Corps (z.b.V.) was established in March 1918. Previously, it had been known as Nordkorps.

With the onset of trench warfare, the German Army recognised that it was no longer possible to maintain the traditional Corps unit, that is, one made up of two divisions. Whereas at some times (and in some places) a Corps of two divisions was sufficient, at other times 5 or 6 divisions were necessary. Therefore, under the Hindenburg regime (from summer 1916), new Corps headquarters were created without organic divisions. These new Corps were designated General Commands for Special Use (German: Generalkommandos zur besonderen Verwendung).

68th Corps was still in existence at the end of the war.

== Commanders ==
The 68th Corps was commanded throughout its existence by Generalleutnant Adolf von Seckendorff.

== See also ==
- German Army (German Empire)

== Bibliography ==
- Cron, Hermann (2002). Imperial German Army 1914-18: Organisation, Structure, Orders-of-Battle [first published: 1937]. Helion & Co. ISBN 1-874622-70-1.
