= 68th Division (1st Formation) (People's Republic of China) =

68th Division (1949–52)
- Active: 1949.2 – 1952.8
- Country: People's Republic of China
- Branch: People's Liberation Army
- Type: Division
- Role: Infantry
- Part of: 23rd Corps
- Engagements: Chinese Civil War

The 68th Division (Chinese: 第68师) was created in February 1949 under the Regulation of the Redesignations of All Organizations and Units of the Army, issued by Central Military Commission on November 1, 1948, basing on the 11th Division, 4th Column of the Huadong Field Army. Its history can be traced to the 2nd Brigade, 1st Division of Huadong Field Army, formed in October 1946.

The division was a part with 23rd Corps. It took part in several major battles during the Chinese Civil War, including the Lunan Campaign, the Laiwu Campaign, the Menglianggu Campaign, the Yudong Campaign, the Huaihai Campaign and the Shanghai Campaign. During the last phase of Huaihai campaign the division captured General Du Yuming, the deputy commander-in-chief of Suppression General Headquarters of Xuzhou Garrison.

The division was composed of 202nd, 203rd and 204th Infantry Regiments.

In August 1952 the division was inactivated:

- Headquarters, 68th Division and Headquarters, 202nd Infantry Regiment were transferred to the People's Liberation Army Air Force;
- 202nd Infantry Regiment was transferred to 67th Division as 199th Infantry Regiment;
- Headquarters, 203rd Infantry Regiment was transferred to the People's Liberation Army Navy.
