= 68th Guards Rifle Division =

- Active: 1943–1947
- Country: Soviet Union
- Branch: Red Army
- Type: Division
- Role: Infantry
- Engagements: Belgorod-Kharkov Offensive; Battle of the Dniepr; Battle of Kiev (1943); Zhitomir–Berdichev Offensive; Proskurov–Chernovitsy Offensive; Lvov-Sandomir Offensive; Budapest Offensive; Siege of Budapest; Operation Konrad III; Operation Spring Awakening; Vienna Offensive
- Decorations: Order of the Red Banner
- Battle honours: Proskurov

Commanders
- Notable commanders: Maj. Gen. Georgii Petrovich Isakov; Maj. Gen. Vladimir Filippovich Stenin; Maj. Gen. Ivan Mikhailovich Nekrasov

The 68th Guards Rifle Division was reformed as an elite infantry division of the Red Army in February 1943, based on the 1st formation of the 96th Rifle Division, and served in that role until after the end of the Great Patriotic War. It originally served in the Stalingrad Group of Forces, mopping up in the ruins of that city after the Axis surrender there before eventually being assigned to the 4th Guards Army and moving north to the Kursk area in the Steppe Military District. It entered combat with its Army during the Belgorod-Kharkov Offensive in August and continued fighting toward the Dniepr River and Kiev during the autumn and early winter. From late September until early November it was involved in the fighting around the Bukrin bridgeheads which ultimately ended in a stalemate. The 68th Guards was part of 1st Ukrainian Front until September, 1944 but was subordinated to numerous army and corps commands during this period and won an honorific in western Ukraine during March; subsequently it was also awarded the Order of the Red Banner for its part in the liberation of Lvov. After being removed to the Reserve of the Supreme High Command for much-needed rebuilding its combat path shifted into the Balkans. While rebuilding its antitank battalion had its towed pieces replaced with self-propelled guns and at the beginning of November the entire division was temporarily motorized to take part in an unsuccessful attempt to seize the city of Budapest via a mechanized thrust. The 68th Guards spent the remainder of the war fighting in Hungary and Austria; its regiments would all receive recognition for their roles in the battles for Budapest. The division was finally assigned to the 30th Rifle Corps of 26th Army in January, 1945 and remained under these headquarters for the duration of the war. Despite a solid record of service the 68th Guards was disbanded within two years.

== Formation ==
The 96th was redesignated as the 68th Guards on February 6, shortly after the German surrender at Stalingrad, and officially received its Guards banner on March 19. Once the division completed its reorganization its order of battle was as follows:

- 198th Guards Rifle Regiment (from 1381st Rifle Regiment)
- 200th Guards Rifle Regiment (from 1384th Rifle Regiment)
- 202nd Guards Rifle Regiment (from 1389th Rifle Regiment)
- 136th Guards Artillery Regiment (from 1059th Artillery Regiment)
- 72nd Guards Antitank Battalion (later 72nd Guards Self-Propelled Artillery Battalion)
- 508th Guards Antiaircraft Battery (until April 20, 1943)
- 70th Guards Reconnaissance Company
- 78th Guards Sapper Battalion
- 98th Guards Signal Battalion (as of December 2, 1944, 98th Guards Signal Company)
- 75th Guards Medical/Sanitation Battalion
- 71st Guards Chemical Defense (Anti-gas) Company
- 74th Guards Motor Transport Company
- 67th Guards Field Bakery
- 69th Guards Divisional Veterinary Hospital
- 1871st Field Postal Station
- 1190th Field Office of the State Bank

Col. Georgii Petrovich Isakov, who had commanded the 96th since October 9, 1942 remained in command; he would be promoted to the rank of major general on February 22. The division had been in the 57th Army on February 1 but was then transferred to 21st Army and shortly after to the Stalingrad Group of Forces where it remained until March 1.

== Into Ukraine ==
After leaving the Stalingrad Group the 68th Guards was reassigned to the 24th Army in the Reserve of the Supreme High Command. In April it was subordinated to the new 21st Guards Rifle Corps along with the 69th Guards and 84th Rifle Divisions as the 24th became the 4th Guards Army within the Steppe Military District. The division remained under these commands and in roughly the same area east of the Kursk salient until early August. In June it was noted that nearly all the personnel of the division were Siberian or of Turkmen nationality and that roughly 50 percent were from the 1918 - 1924 year groups (19-25 year-olds).

Following the defeat of the German Zitadelle offensive the 4th Guards Army, under command of Lt. Gen. G. I. Kulik and still in reserve, was concentrating in the area of Chernyanka, Orlik and Loznoe on July 23. By August 17 the Army had been assigned to Army Gen. N. F. Vatutin's Voronezh Front and was now concentrated in the area from Yamnoye to Novaya Ryabina to Yablochnoye. As the Front pressed on towards Kharkov panzer forces of Army Group South counterattacked in the area of Akhtyrka and Vatutin received orders to eliminate this grouping to ward off the possible isolation of 27th Army. These orders were passed to the 27th, the 4th and 6th Guards and 1st Tank Armies. 4th Guards initially committed two divisions of its 20th Guards Rifle Corps to this effort and by August 20 the German riposte was brought to a halt. The Army was tasked with attacking toward Kotelva the following day; by August 27 it had reached the Vorskla River and captured Kotelva.

=== Battle of the Dniepr ===
During September the 68th Guards was transferred to the 52nd Rifle Corps of 40th Army, still in Voronezh Front. As of September 20 the division had 4,418 personnel on strength, armed with a total of 37 guns and 82 mortars. During the last week of the month it was approaching Bukrin on the Dniepr north of Kaniv. On September 23 the Army commander, Col. Gen. K. S. Moskalenko, wrote to his 47th and 52nd Corps: "The Dnepr River must be forced in the most favorable places, without regard for boundary lines and available crossing equipment." On the same day units of the 52nd Corps, including the division, began crossing northwest and southeast of Rzhyshchiv near Staiki, Grebeni and Shchuchinka but only with infantry and at a slow pace. Overnight two airborne brigades were dropped in the Kanev area but had little effect on the overall operation. Despite this failure by September 25 the Bukrin bridgehead was about 6 km in depth and 10–12 km wide and by the next day the crossing of 40th Army's infantry was basically completed. In recognition of his leadership in the successful crossing, on October 23 General Isakov would be made a Hero of the Soviet Union.

==== Shchuchinka Bridgehead ====
On September 27–29 fierce fighting was waged for the bridgeheads from Staiki as far south as Kaniv as German forces converged on this sector. The Front reserve, 27th Army, was ordered to relieve units of the 40th Army on the sector from Yanivka to Shandra on September 30; meanwhile on the 29th the 52nd Corps was still fighting to expand its bridgeheads on each side of Rzhyshchiv which were now between 11 and 16 km wide and up to 4 km deep. It was facing the German 34th Infantry and 10th Motorized Divisions while the 2nd SS Panzer-Grenadier Division Das Reich was approaching the area. German counterattacks followed on October 2 and by the 5th the northwest bridgehead had been effectively abandoned while the 68th Guards was pushed back somewhat in the southeastern lodgement near Shchuchinka. Otherwise the several bridgeheads from Rzhyshchiv to Kaniv held firm as the counterattackers suffered significant losses in men and tanks.

From October 6–11 a period of quiet settled along this front. The Soviet forces prepared to go back to the offensive but were hampered by the ongoing shortage of crossing means and therefore ammunition and heavy equipment; as of October 10 the Shchuchinka bridgehead had just one eight-tonne and one 30-tonne ferry available and a bridge was under construction. In the plan for the offensive the 68th Guards and 309th Rifle Divisions were to attack to the south and southeast on the first day to assist the 47th Rifle Corps in the Khodorov area and then to develop the offensive the next day and roll up the German defenses along the west bank of the river. The offensive began at 0700 hours on October 12 with a 40-minute artillery preparation, followed by the direct fire of tanks, regimental and antitank guns until 1100 hours. The 68th Guards attacked from Shchuchinka but despite this support and airstrikes by 2nd Air Army the German forces put up stubborn resistance, in large part because reconnaissance of their defenses and fire systems had been inadequate. By the end of the day the 52nd Corps had advanced less than 1000 metres and units of the 2nd SS were being shifted east to help defend other sectors of the several Bukrin bridgeheads. During this fighting General Isakov was seriously wounded and evacuated to hospital; following his recovery he was sent to the Voroshilov Academy from which he graduated in September, 1944 before taking command of the 18th Guards Rifle Division. He was replaced in command of the division by Maj. Gen. Vladimir Filippovich Stenin on October 25.

General Vatutin continued to press the offensive until October 16 despite very limited progress. Four days later his Front was redesignated as 1st Ukrainian. The next day, following a one-hour artillery preparation, the 47th Corps penetrated 3 km into the German defenses and linked up with 52nd Corps at Shchuchinka. By October 23 Vatutin had changed his plan to focus all his Front's efforts on the sectors held by 40th Army and the right flank of 27th Army, but this was cancelled by the STAVKA late on October 24; it had concluded that further efforts to break out of the Bukrin bridgeheads would be futile, largely owing to the difficult terrain. A new offensive was planned to begin on November 3 with the intention to advance instead from the Lyutezh bridgehead north of Kiev. The 68th Guards and 309th Divisions were to launch a supporting attack along a 9 km-wide front from their bridgehead. This diversion began on November 1 with 40 minutes of artillery and airstrikes. The two divisions managed to capture the first, and in places the second line of German trenches but advanced no more than 1,500 metres. The fighting continued into November 5 and achieved little more than drawing the 2nd SS out of reserve but by the next day it was clear that Kiev was about to be liberated from Lyutezh and the 40th and 27th Armies were ordered to maintain the impression of a coming attack with false troop concentrations and dummy tanks.

== Into Western Ukraine ==
Late on November 10 Vatutin ordered the 40th Army to shift its main efforts from the bridgeheads to the Chernyakov area. The 68th Guards was also to be moved from the bridgehead to the Kailov area. Overnight on November 11/12 the division crossed to the east bank in order to cross back near Kailov to the north. By November 15 the 38th Army, which had liberated Kiev and exploited as far as Zhitomir, was being counterattacked by 1st Panzer Army and the 52nd Corps was crossing at Kailov to organize a second defensive zone along the Stuhna River. On November 18 the division was transferred to the 38th Army. During November 22 the German forces pushed forward to Chernyakov but were clearly running out of steam. Vatutin issued new orders on November 23 to renew the offensive two days later, but when the deadline arrived his armies, including the 38th, were not ready to attack due to ammunition shortages and the fact that regrouping had not been completed. At this time the Army was defending in the Stavyshche area. After a 24-hour postponement the 52nd Corps went over to the attack but had no success and Vatutin ordered a halt on November 28. By the end of the month the 68th Guards had come under the command of the 17th Guards Rifle Corps, still in 38th Army.

The Front resumed its offensive on December 24 with the immediate objective of re-liberating Zhitomir, which took place on December 31. During the next month the Front advanced southwest as 4th Panzer Army's position deteriorated and 1st Panzer Army moved in to reinforce it. By January 1, 1944, a gap of 115 km had been forced between the two German armies. By January 4 the German XIII Army Corps, which was defending against 38th Army at and northwest of Berdychiv, was reporting that it was falling apart, with its divisions down to 150-300 men in the front line. After pushing past this city the Front's offensive gradually ground to a halt by January 14. During February and much of March the Ukrainian Fronts were primarily engaged in the Dniepr bend and south of the Pripyat marshes, but on March 4 the 1st Ukrainian launched the Proskurov–Chernovitsy Offensive which eventually led to the encirclement of 1st Panzer Army. During this offensive the division was recognized for its part in the liberation of the former city with an honorific:

PROSKUROV... 68th Guards Rifle Division (Major General Stenin, Vladimir Filippovich)... The troops who participated in the liberation of Proskurov, by the order of the Supreme High Command of March 25, 1944, and a commendation in Moscow, are given a salute of 12 artillery salvoes from 124 guns.

Prior to the offensive the division had moved with the 17th Guards Corps to the 1st Guards Army but during March it was transferred to the 47th Rifle Corps in the same Army; in April it was reassigned again within the Front to the 22nd Rifle Corps of 60th Army.

=== Lvov–Sandomierz Offensive ===
In May the division was again reassigned, now to the 23rd Rifle Corps of 60th Army. In the planning for a new offensive the Army commander, Col. Gen. P. A. Kurochkin, assigned his 15th and 28th Rifle Corps to the main task of driving westward to Lvov in conjunction with the 3rd Guards Tank Army, while the 23rd Corps was to attack in the general direction of Sokolovka to encircle and destroy the German forces in the Brody area (primarily XIII Corps) in cooperation with the left flank units of 13th Army. The operation began with reconnaissance actions on July 13, and the shock groups went over to the attack at 1600 hours the next day while 23rd Corps was deployed from Markopol to Batkuv, redeploying to a line from Chepel to outside Kruguv on July 15. By this time the Army's lead forces had wedged to a depth of 14–16 km into the German defenses and the following morning the 3rd Guards Tank was committed into the breach.

By now the German forces, recognizing their deteriorating position, were attempting to both withdraw to the west and to counterattack to restore their lines. During the day the 23rd Corps fought along a line from Chepel to Opaki and advanced 6–8 km on July 17. Despite at least four counterattacks by tanks and infantry the Corps reached a line from Zharkiv through Maidan and Dzvonets by the end of the next day, during which the Brody grouping, consisting of the 340th, 361st, and 349th Infantry Divisions, Corps Detachment 'C', 454th Security Division, and the 14th SS Grenadier Division 1st Galician, was encircled both internally and externally. During July 19 the Corps cleared out the "Koltuv salient", destroying up to a regiment of the 349th Infantry. The trapped German forces were rapidly worn down due to heavy losses in breakout attempts, loss of command and control, heavy Soviet artillery fire and airstrikes, and lack of supply. The liquidation of XIII Corps was completed in the latter half of July 22. 30,000 German troops had been killed in the battle and more than 17,000 taken prisoner. On July 27 the 60th Army launched a decisive attack on the city of Lvov with the 23rd Corps advancing from the north, the 28th Corps from the east, and the 106th Rifle Corps from the southeast, all in support of the 4th Tank Army which had followed 3rd Guards Tank into 60th Army's breach and was already fighting within the city. The city was liberated the same day and on August 10 the 68th Guards would receive the Order of the Red Banner for its part in the fighting.

== Into the Balkans ==
The division reached the pre-war border on July 29, crossed the Wisłok River into Poland and soon entered the city of Rzeszów, which was already largely in the hands of the Home Army. Late in August Kurochkin accused General Stenin of failure to follow orders and on September 3 he was removed from command. After a period in reserve he was given command of the 4th Rifle Division and became a Hero of the Soviet Union in April, 1945. During September the division continued advancing west under the same headquarters but was then withdrawn into the Reserve of the Supreme High Command with its Corps and joined the rebuilding 6th Army. During this time the 72nd Guards Antitank Battalion was re-equipped with SU-76 self-propelled guns and was redesignated as the 72nd Guards Self-Propelled Artillery Battalion. On October 10 Maj. Gen. Ivan Mikhailovich Nekrasov took command of the division and he would remain in this post for the duration of the war; this officer had been made a Hero of the Soviet Union in September, 1941 following the Yelnya Offensive. In October the Corps returned to the front as a separate corps in the 2nd Ukrainian Front which was now operating in Hungary.

=== Budapest Campaign ===
By November 1 the 4th Guards Mechanized Corps had concentrated in the area west of Kiskunfélegyháza where it joined the 68th Guards which had been entirely motorized using army and Front automotive assets. The combined task group was ordered to attack in the direction of Izsák and Kunszentmiklós and by the morning of the next day reach the area from Alsónémedi to Szigetszentmiklós to Szigetcsép with the intention of capturing Budapest from the march in cooperation with the 2nd Guards Mechanized Corps. At 1800 hours the task group came into contact with Axis forces in the Szabadszállás area but outflanked their positions from the east and continued driving north. This drive continued during the first part of November 2 when Bugyi and Ócsa were taken, but by now the 2nd Guards Mechanized was running into increasing resistance. As the task group pushed ahead it was forced to cover its flanks with part of its forces although marching formations of 46th Army were coming up from the rear. The German high command, seeing the threat to the Hungarian capital, began to hurriedly transfer the III Panzer Corps from the Miskolc axis to counter it. On November 3 the 15th Mechanized Brigade broke into Kussuthfalva, immediately south of the city, but under heavy pressure from Axis infantry, artillery and tanks was forced to fall back. This effectively ended the effort to take Budapest by a coup de main and by late on November 5 the entire breakthrough force was being heavily counterattacked.

Later in November the entire 23rd Corps was subordinated to the 46th Army. The 68th Guards had fallen back from Budapest and crossed to the west bank of the Danube where it joined the 99th Rifle Division south of Paks. During December the division was reassigned to the 18th Guards Rifle Corps, which was a separate corps in 2nd Ukrainian Front. At this time the STAVKA was intent on encircling Budapest, which entailed breaking through the Margit Line between Lake Balaton and Lake Velence with 46th Army. The 18th Guards Corps relieved part of this Army in preparation for this new drive. The encirclement of the city was completed on December 26.

German efforts to relieve the Axis forces in Budapest began on January 1, 1945, with the first Operation Konrad, but by now the 68th Guards had recrossed to the east bank as part of the besieging force directly south of the city. Operation Konrad III, which began on January 17, was a more powerful attack and required the division to return to the west bank and take up defensive positions along a line from Nagykarácsony to Cece on January 21. At this time it was assigned to the 30th Rifle Corps of 26th Army in 3rd Ukrainian Front, and it remained under these commands for the duration of the war. On the same day encircled elements of the 18th Tank and 133rd Rifle Corps made a fighting breakout to the area northwest of Dunapentele and joined the defensive line. German forces continued to attack along this axis until January 26 but the combined Soviet force held its positions. During the last days of the month and into February the German penetrations south of Lake Velence were pushed back; the 18th Tanks advanced in the direction of Seregélyes and on February 6 was engaged in stubborn fighting along with the 68th and 36th Guards and the 155th Rifle Divisions before going over to the defensive.

Budapest was finally taken on February 13 and two regiments of the division were rewarded with honorifics:

BUDAPEST... 198th Guards Rifle Regiment (Major Tkachev, Ivan Petrovich)... 136th Guards Artillery Regiment (Major Bolilyi, Vasilii Filippovich; as of January 31 Captain Frolov, Mikhail Petrovich)... The troops who participated in the capture of Budapest, by the order of the Supreme High Command of February 13, 1945, and a commendation in Moscow, are given a salute of 24 artillery salvoes from 324 guns.

On April 5 the 200th and 202nd Guards Rifle Regiments would also be recognized for their roles in the victory with the Order of Kutuzov, 3rd Degree.

== Postwar ==
Following the defeat of Operation Spring Awakening in March the 26th Army took part in the Vienna Offensive and the division ended the war in eastern Austria. At the time of the German surrender the men and women of the division shared the full title of 68th Guards Rifle, Proskurov, Order of the Red Banner Division. (Russian: 68-я гвардейская стрелковая Проскуровская Краснознамённая дивизия.) The 26th Army was assigned to the Southern Group of Forces and the division, along with most of the Army, was disbanded in 1947.
