= '68 (comic book) =

Comic book series by Mark Kidwell

Publication information
- Publisher: Image Comics
- Schedule: Monthly
- Format: war Zombie horror
- Publication date: April 2011 – 2016
- No. of issues: 21

Creative team
- Written by: Mark Kidwell

Collected editions
- Better Run Through the Jungle: ISBN 1-60706-516-9
- Scars: ISBN 1-60706-669-6
- Jungle Jim: ISBN 1-60706-802-8
- Rule of War: ISBN 1-63215-172-3
- Homefront: ISBN 1-63215-625-3
- Last Rites: ISBN 1-5343-0030-9

'68 is a monthly comic book series created by writer Mark Kidwell, and published by Image Comics about a zombie apocalypse set in 1968 during the Vietnam War and the peace movement against the war. The stories follow the survivors, both military and civilian, in both Vietnam and the United States.

The series is marketed as various limited series for each story or one-shots. The origin of the comic dates back to 2006 when the comic simply titled '68 was published. The ongoing series started in April 2011 and the original 2006 issue was republished in October of that year as the Encore Edition.

== Publication history ==
=== '68 ===
'68 is a four-issue mini-series covering the period of February 13 and 14, 1968, at the start of the zombie outbreak in Vietnam and the United States. The story follows a unit of US soldiers who are under siege at a firebase by the zombie hordes.

=== Scars ===
'68: Scars is a four-issue mini-series covering the period from February 14 to February 18, 1968. The story follows the defense of Tan Son Nhat International Airport in Saigon by US troops against a combined force of both VC soldiers and zombies. Also included is the story of a group of US soldiers trying to survive on the Mekong river and the parents of one of the main characters back in the United States who are trapped in the now overrun New York City.

=== Jungle Jim ===
'68: Jungle Jim is a four-issue mini-series covering the period from March 27 to March 29, 1968. The story originally started in the one-shot issue Jungle Jim. It follows a United States Marine who is waging his personal war against both the VC and the zombie hordes in the jungles far west of Da Nang, on the border with Laos. He also makes attempts to save a group of orphaned children and missionaries who are being held by a group of rogue Viet Cong.

=== Rule of War ===
'68: Rule of War is a four-issue mini-series published in early 2014.

=== Homefront ===
'68: Homefront is a four-issue mini-series published in late 2014. It consists of 2 unrelated story arcs of 2 issues each. The first one called "Peece and Love" and the second one "Dodgers".

=== Last Rites ===
'68: Last Rites is a four-issue mini-series that began publishing in July 2015.

=== One-shots ===
Six one-shots have been published so far: '68 (December 2006), '68: Hardship (November 2011), '68: Jungle Jim (December 2011) '68: Hallowed Ground (November 2013), '68: Bad Sign (2015) and '68: Jungle Jim: Guts 'N Glory (March 2015).

== Collected editions ==
The various series have been collected in the following trade paperbacks.

#	Title	Release date	Collected material
1	'68 Vol. 1 – Better Run Through the Jungle	March 20, 2012	'68 #1–4 & '68 one-shot
2	'68 Vol. 2 – Scars	April 9, 2013	'68: Scars #1–4 & '68: Hardship
3	'68 Vol. 3 – Jungle Jim	October 29, 2013	'68: Jungle Jim #1–4 & '68: Jungle Jim one-shot
4	'68 Vol. 4 – Rule of War	January 28, 2015	'68: Rule of War #1–4 & '68: Hallowed Ground one-shot
5	'68 Vol. 5 – Homefront	January 26, 2016	'68: Homefront #1–4 & '68: Bad Sign one-shot
6	'68 Vol. 6 – Last Rites	January 31, 2017	'68: Last Rites #1–4 & '68: Jungle Jim: Guts 'n Glory one-shot
