= Yablochnoye =

Yablochnoye Яблочное
- Selo
- Location within Voronezh Oblast Location within Russia
- Coordinates: 51°18′N 39°00′E
- Country: Russia
- Region: Voronezh Oblast
- District: Khokholsky District
- Time zone: UTC+3:00

Yablochnoye (Russian: Яблочное) is a rural locality (a selo) and the administrative center of Yablochenskoye Urban Settlement, Khokholsky District, Voronezh Oblast, Russia. The population was 744 as of 2010. There are 19 streets.

== Geography ==
Yablochnoye is located 44 km southeast of Khokholsky (the district's administrative centre) by road. Oskino is the nearest rural locality.
