= '68 (album) =

Compilation album by Robert Wyatt
- Released: 8 October 2013
- Recorded: 1968
- Genre: Canterbury scene, jazz fusion
- Length: 46:57
- Label: Cuneiform
- Producer: Robert Wyatt

Robert Wyatt chronology
Radio Experiment Rome, February 1981 (2009)	'68 (2013)

'68 is a compilation album by Robert Wyatt. It is composed of previously unreleased demos Wyatt recorded in 1968 at the end of a tour Soft Machine did with the Jimi Hendrix Experience in the United States. It was released by Cuneiform Records in 2013.

After the tour, the Experience had given Wyatt access to their recording studios after hours, and he recorded these demos there. Hendrix played bass guitar on one of the recordings, "Slow Walkin' Talk". Some of the tracks were later reworked and used on several Soft Machine and Matching Mole albums.

== Release ==
'68 was released on 8 October 2013 on LP in a limited edition, and on CD and digital. Three further limited edition LP pressings were released in 2014.

Vinyl

- 1st pressing – 8 October 2013 – White – 500 copies
- 2nd pressing – January 2014 – Sky Blue – 600 copies
- 3rd pressing – September 2014 – Gold/Yellow – 250 copies
- 4th pressing – September 2014 – Blue – 250 copies

CD

- 8 October 2013 – Sound Performance pressings
- 8 October 2013 – Disc Makers pressings

Digital

- 8 October 2013 – includes a bonus track, "Rivmic Melodies (Radio Edit)"

== Reception ==
Professional ratings
Review scores
Source	Rating
AllMusic	4/5 stars
PopMatters	7/10 stars
Rolling Stone	Favourable
Tom Hull	B+

Writing at AllMusic, Thom Jurek said Cuneiform Records has "delivered a Holy Grail" with this album, considering that some of the recordings were believed lost, or not to have been made at all. He said that the cleaning and remastering has produced an "excellent" sound, and he described the compilation as "All killer, no filler".

In a review in PopMatters, Maria Schurr called '68 "especially edifying to Soft Machine die-hards", and a "great ... lost musical treasure". Rolling Stone called the album "By far one of the year's best releases".

== Track listing ==
All tracks are written by Robert Wyatt, except where noted (Note: "Rivmic Melodies" is mostly credited to Hugh Hopper on The Soft Machine Volume Two)

No.	Title	Length
1.	"Chelsa" (Daevid Allen, (Note: The lyrics for "Chelsa" were wrongly credited to Kevin Ayers in the liner notes; they were written by Daevid Allen.) Wyatt)	5:00
2.	"Rivmic Melodies"	18:19
3.	"Slow Walkin' Talk" (Brian Hopper)	3:02
4.	"Moon in June"	20:36

== Personnel ==
- Robert Wyatt – vocals, piano, electric piano, Hammond organ, bass guitar, drums, percussion
- Jimi Hendrix – bass guitar (track 3)
- Hugh Hopper – bass guitar (track 4)
- Mike Ratledge – Lowrey organ (track 4)
