= '68 (film) =

1988 film by Steven Kovacs

- DVD cover
- Directed by: Steven Kovacs
- Written by: Steven Kovacs
- Produced by: Dale Djerassi; Isabel Maxwell
- Starring: Eric Larson; Robert Locke
- Cinematography: Daniel Lacambre
- Edited by: Cari Coughlin
- Music by: Shony Alex Braun; John Cipollina
- Distributed by: New World Pictures
- Release date: May 6, 1988
- Running time: 98 minutes
- Country: United States
- Language: English

'68 is a 1988 drama film directed by Steven Kovacs. The film follows a full year of a Hungarian family living in San Francisco in 1968.

== Plot ==
The father escaped the Soviet Invasion of Budapest and now runs a Hungarian restaurant that is not doing well financially. The younger of his two sons is gay and struggling with coming out. His dad disowns him when he finally does. The older son is involved in the counterculture, gets kicked out of college, buys a motorcycle, starts dating a Maoist, and is also disowned by his father. The older of the sons runs afoul of an outlaw motorcycle club; the younger of the two sons gets drafted but is rejected because of his homosexuality. The older one joins his younger brother in a gay rights protest.

Major events of the year such as the assassination of Martin Luther King and the assassination of Robert F. Kennedy are interspersed throughout the plot and depicted in the film using stock footage.

== Cast ==
- Eric Larson as Peter Szabo
- Robert Locke as Sandy Szabo
- Sándor Técsy as Zoltan Szabo
- Anna Dukasz as Zsuzsa Szabo
- Miran Kwun as Alana Chan
- Terra Vandergaw as Vera Kardos
- Shony Alex Braun as Tibor Kardos
- Donna Pecora as Piroska Kardos
- Elizabeth De Charay as Gizi Horvath
- Jan Nemec as Dezso Horvath
- Rusdi Lane as Bela Csontos
- Nike Doukas as Beatrice
- Neil Young as Westy
- Frank X. Mur as Officer
- Joel Parker as Protester
- Paul Pedrol as Client
- James Russel

== Release and reception ==
'68 was first shown at the AFI Los Angeles International Film Festival during March 11–26, 1987. Ben Kallen praised Neil Young's cameo performance in the LA Weekly's collection of reviews, but found the film clichéd. The film was then regionally released on May 6, 1988. The film was also shown at the Deauville Film Festival in September 1988 in which Steven Kovacs was nominated for the Critics' Award. Reviewers found the movie to be nostalgic but lacking in substance. Michael Sragow of The San Francisco Examiner found the screenplay "over-stuffed" and "strident." Michael H. Price at the Fort Worth Star-Telegram praised the film's historical accuracy and camera work, but found the film tortured. Time Out says "Kovacs' episodic attempt to evoke the trippy, dippy and momentous days of '68... finally peters out in a bathetic happy resolution of sorts."
