= 68th Regiment =

68th Regiment or 68th Infantry Regiment may refer to:

- 68th (Durham) Regiment of Foot (Light Infantry), an infantry unit of the British Army
- 68th Armor Regiment, an armoured unit of the US Army
- 68th Armoured Regiment (India), a armoured unit of the Indian Army

American Civil War

- 68th Illinois Volunteer Infantry Regiment, a unit of the Union (Northern) Army
- 68th Indiana Infantry Regiment, a unit of the Union (Northern) Army
- 68th New York Volunteer Infantry Regiment, a unit of the Union (Northern) Army
- 68th Ohio Infantry, a unit of the Union (Northern) Army
- 68th Pennsylvania Infantry, a unit of the Union (Northern) Army

== See also ==
- 68th Division (disambiguation)
