= 258th Rifle Division =

258th Rifle Division (July 10, 1941 – January 5, 1942) 258th Rifle Division (April 25, 1942 – May 4, 1943) 258th Rifle Division (July 28, 1943 – August 1946)
- Active: 1941–1946
- Country: Soviet Union
- Branch: Red Army; Soviet Army
- Type: Infantry
- Size: Division
- Engagements: Battle of Bryansk (1941); Battle of Moscow; Battle of Stalingrad; Operation Uranus; Battle of Rostov (1943); Soviet invasion of Manchuria
- Decorations: Order of the Red Banner (3rd Formation)

Commanders
- Notable commanders: Kombrig Kuzma Petrovich Trubnikov; Maj. Gen. Mikhail Aleksandrovich Siyazov; Col. Pyotr Selvestrovich Khaustovich; Col. Ivan Yakovlevich Fursin; Col. Semyon Samuilovich Levin; Col. Andrei Afanasievich Chartorizhskii; Col. Afanasii Antonovich Zelenkov; Col. Pyotr Vasilevich Dmitriev

The 258th Rifle Division first began forming in the Central Asian Military District as one of the Red Army's first ethnic or "national" rifle divisions after the German invasion of the USSR. Based on a cadre of men of Uzbek nationality it was subsequently known as the "Uzbek" division. It was based on the shtat (table of organization and equipment) of April 5, 1941 with modifications due to the emergency. It was soon moved by rail to the Oryol Military District for further building and equipping, and entered the fighting front on August 3, assigned to 43rd Army of Reserve Front west of Bryansk. Within days it was reassigned to the Separate 2nd Rifle Corps, headquartered at Bryansk. On August 14 the entire Corps became the basis of the new 50th Army in Bryansk Front. After minor battles with 2nd Panzer Group into September, but mostly holding its positions, the division was loosely encircled during the German Operation Typhoon in October. It managed to escape with significant casualties, and took up part of the defense of the city of Tula into early December. It then joined the winter counteroffensive which took it to the city of Kaluga. The city was liberated on December 30, and the division was redesignated as the 12th Guards Rifle Division.

A new 258th was formed in late April 1942 based on the 1st formation of the 43rd Rifle Brigade. After several months of forming up and training, first in the Moscow area and later in the Don River area it was assigned to the 1st Guards Army in Stalingrad Front but soon moved to Don Front. During September and October it took part in two offensives attempting to break through to Stalingrad from the north, but these proved to be abortive and costly efforts. Later in October the division was briefly moved to 24th Army in the same Front, but was shifted to 65th Army prior to the start of the Soviet counteroffensive. After German 6th Army was encircled in late November the 258th shifted south, first to 5th Tank Army and later to the newly-formed 5th Shock Army, soon part of the re-created Southern Front. It remained under these commands for the duration of this formation, advancing westward along the Don River and into the eastern Donbas, reaching the Mius River in late February, 1943. For these accomplishments it became the 96th Guards Rifle Division on May 4.

A third 258th was formed in 25th Army of Far Eastern Front in July 1943, based on a separate rifle regiment. It remained under these commands for the remainder of the year, joining 88th Rifle Corps in August. When the Manchurian operation began on August 9, 1945 the division, with its Corps, was in the reserves of 1st Far Eastern Front and was committed two days later. During the remainder of the month it advanced into northern Korea, eventually reaching the 38th parallel. In recognition of its part in the victory, on September 19 it was awarded the Order of the Red Banner. It was disbanded in August 1946.

== 1st Formation ==
The 258th began forming on July 10 in the Central Asian Military District on the basis of 452 Communist Party members and 1,815 Komsomols from Uzbekistan. It was subsequently known as the "Uzbek" division. The partly-formed division was then railed westward to Oryol in late July, and then to Tula, where it started arriving on August 2. Once formed the division had following order of battle:

- 954th Rifle Regiment (originally designated as 405th)
- 991st Rifle Regiment
- 999th Rifle Regiment
- 841st Artillery Regiment
- 342nd Antitank Battalion
- 361st Reconnaissance Company
- 557th Sapper Battalion
- 737th Signal Battalion
- 305th Medical/Sanitation Battalion
- 304th Chemical Defense (Anti-gas) Company
- 732nd Motor Transport Battalion
- 388th Field Bakery
- 650th Divisional Veterinary Hospital
- 957th Field Postal Station
- 841st Field Office of the State Bank

Kombrig Kuzma Petrovich Trubnikov was appointed to command on the day the division began forming. He had led the 25th Rifle Division from June 1935 to June 1938, but as his obsolete rank indicates, he was arrested and imprisoned during the Great Purge and not released until February 15, 1940. He served as an instructor on tactics until he was posted to the 258th.

== Battle of Bryansk ==
On August 3 the 4th Panzer Division captured Roslavl and the next day the 2nd Panzer Group completed the encirclement of Group Kachalov north of the city. This impending disaster was brought to the attention of Army Gen. G. K. Zhukov in a report by Maj. Gen. P. I. Lyapin, the chief of staff of the Front of Reserve Armies, at 1730 hours on August 3. As part of this report he wrote:

2. The 43rd Army's commander requests permission to occupy a defense along the previously fortified Zhukovka and Stolby line (50 kilometres northwest and west of Bryansk) with 258th RD, and, at the same time, the General Staff designated a defensive line for that division along the Gorodets, Opakhan', and Hill 178 line.
Lieutenant General Bogdanov [the deputy commander of the Front of Reserve Armies] approved General Zakharkin's decision regarding the movement of 258th Division into the previously prepared line... The 258th RD unloaded from 11 trains in the Sel'tso and Bryansk region; and one regiment is already occupying this defense.

Based on this report Zhukov took immediate action to rescue Group Kachalov and restore the Front's defenses in this region, including reinforcing 43rd Army with Trubnikov's division. At 0312 hours on August 5 he further ordered that the reconnaissance company of the 217th Rifle Division tie in with the 258th near Zhukovka. Meanwhile, Group Kachalov was effectively eliminated by the end of August 6, with over 80 percent of its initial forces lost.

In an effort to improve command and control in Reserve Front the STAVKA issued a directive on August 6. Among other provisions the 258th was grouped with the 260th and 290th Rifle Divisions, the 2nd Rifle Corps' artillery regiments, and the 753rd and 761st Antitank Artillery Regiments into the 2nd Separate Rifle Corps, outside of Army command. It was led by Maj. Gen. A. N. Yermakov and was headquartered at Bryansk. At 2030 hours the same day, Zhukov sent an order to his Reserve Front, which, in part, stated that the Corps was to defend the Zhukovka, Vysokoe, and Makarovo line to protect the Bryansk axis. On August 14 the STAVKA went beyond this by forming a new Bryansk Front, under command of Lt. Gen. A. I. Yeryomenko, with Yermakov as his deputy commander. The 258th was moved to 50th Army, along with the other divisions 2nd Separate Corps, joined by five other rifle divisions and the 55th Cavalry Division. The Army's headquarters would be based on that of the Corps, and Maj. Gen. M. P. Petrov was appointed to command. The 258th would remain under command of this Army for the duration of its 1st formation.

At 2000 hours on August 16 Petrov issued his Combat Order No. 1, in which he gave Trubnikov the mission of defending, along with the two antitank regiments, the Stolby–Zhukovka line while also reconnoitering to the Seshcha and Yudin line and protecting the Army boundary on the right. The order set the stage for an encounter battle between Bryansk Front and 2nd Panzer Group on August 19 when XXXXVII Motorized Corps began wheeling its reconnaissance elements eastward toward Bryansk and Trubchevsk. Petrov issued more concrete orders to his Army at 1100 hours which stated in part:

Enemy Situation - at least one motorized division with tanks along the Mglin and Unecha trying to cut communications between Bryansk to Gomel', with his forward units capturing Unecha and Starodub on 18 August...
217th, 279th, 258th, 260th, 278th, and 290th RDs - defend your sectors and actively reconnoiter along your fronts.

Five divisions, including the 258th, were especially directed to reconnoiter the German force to facilitate its destruction by bomber aircraft overnight on August 19/20. Over the following days, elements of XXXXVII Motorized inched ever closer to Pochep, threatening to break through Soviet defenses and reach the west bank of the Desna River. Convinced that Pochep was crucial to the defense, Petrov issued orders to part of his Army in the afternoon of August 23 to seize and hold the town, regardless of if it was occupied or not. Within hours General Yeryomenko effectively countermanded this plan by spelling out his defensive plans more thoroughly. At 2300 hours on August 24 Petrov issued fresh orders to his Army, which was stretched along a 100km-wide front and facing two panzer divisions and a motorized division:

258th RD (with 761st ATR and 151st CAR [Cannon Artillery Regiment]) - remain in your present positions, defend the Zhukovka and Stolby sector, paying special attention to the Bryansk-Roslavl' road and Ovstug, Uprusy, and Sal'nikovo axes, reconnoiter to the Staraya Kochevo and Kletnaya line...

The division was also directed to protect its boundary with the 260th Division. When 2nd Panzer Group renewed its offensive on August 26 the division was in the same positions.

Yeryomenko's headquarters issued an operational summary at 0600 on August 27 which stated that active operations were taking place in the 217th Division's sector, while small German groups were operating near the 258th and 279th Divisions, but their positions were unchanged. By the end of the next day he realized he faced serious challenges across nearly his entire Front, but the 258th's sector remained quiet. In response to the deteriorating situation, the STAVKA sent him a new directive at 0610 hours on August 30 requiring him to attack with most of the Front's forces, but in 50th Army the 217th, 279th, 258th and 290th Divisions were to continue to defend their positions while the remainder attacked on September 3. The objective was to encircle and destroy 2nd Panzer Group in the Pochep, Trubshevsk, Novhorod-Siverskyi and Novozybkov region, an utterly unrealistic goal, especially given the weakened state of the 13th and 21st Armies.

Trubnikov's orders changed slightly on September 1 when he was directed, along with 761st ATR, to conduct reinforced reconnaissance to the Grabovka and Kletnya line, some 30km west to 38km southwest of Zhukovka; the 645th CAR, subordinate to the 260th Division, was to protect the boundary between it and the 258th in the Uprusy and Stolby region. In the event the Roslavl-Novozybkov Offensive began on September 2, and in a report issued at 1800 hours Yeryomenko stated, in part:

258th RD - regrouping forces to its right wing and occupying defenses from the mouth of the Seshcha River southward to Stolby, with a reinforced company reconnoitering on the morning of 1 September and reaching the edge of the woods south of Gostilovka State Farm by day's end. Losses - 19 killed, 43 wounded, and 8 missing in action.

On September 4 the division remained defending with the 260th on an inactive sector. The next day it moved a reinforced battalion to positions on Hill 178.8 to protect the boundary between 50th and 3rd Armies.

The STAVKA was unaware at this time that 2nd Panzer Group was, in fact, making preparations for its drive to the south which would help encircle the Soviet armies east of Kyiv. As part of this the XXXXVII Panzer Corps, for example, had withdrawn from a bridgehead it had formed across the Desna. A report from Yeryomenko late on September 6 failed to acknowledge this reality while stating, among other details, that the 258th was still holding near Stolby, facing units of the German 78th Infantry Division. Four hours later, Petrov issued attack orders to his Army, but the division was not part of the shock group, instead being directed to extend its front toward the southwest in order to allow the 299th Rifle Division to further concentrate. This mini-offensive proved to be the last gasp of Yeryomenko's ambitious general offensive, which he acknowledged in a message to the STAVKA the next day.

=== Operation Typhoon ===
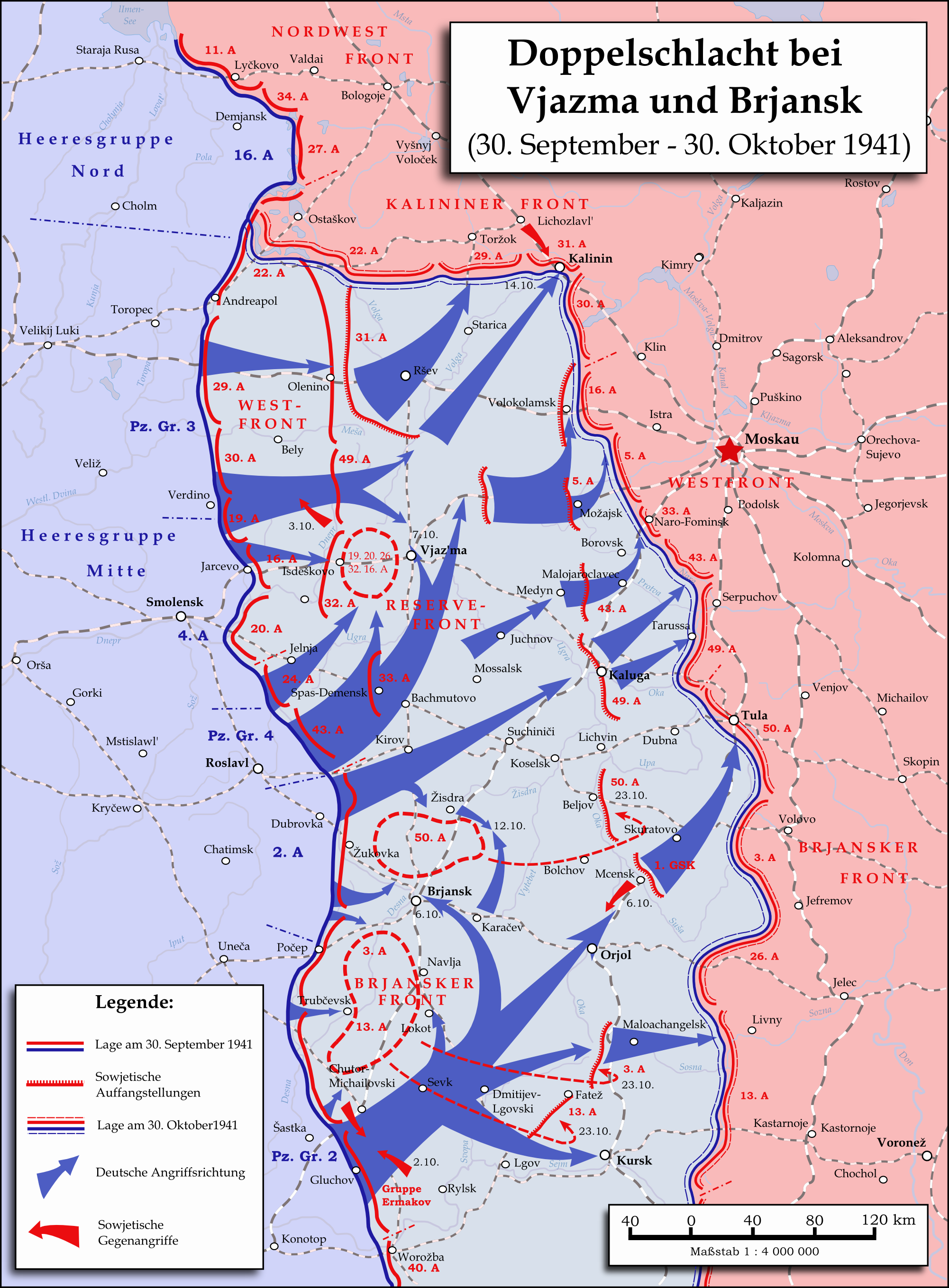
Operation Typhoon. Note positions of 50th Army.

The STAVKA replied on September 10 with an order to go over to the defense. Bryansk Front now held a sector with a length of 345km with a total of 25 rifle divisions, one tank division and four cavalry divisions. Despite this the Front's armies continued active combat operations in pursuit of local objectives and by September 30 it had lost roughly 40 percent of its tanks. At the same time it had 63,919 personnel on strength, 77 percent of the authorized number. Yeryomenko completely failed to appreciate that the German command would so quickly swing around to the north after the destruction of Southwestern Front. He finally directed the Front to go over to the defense at 1330 hours on September 28, with the indication that "within the next several days an enemy offensive toward Bryansk and toward Sevsk or L'gov must be expected." Intelligence indicated that German forces were concentrating on the boundary between 50th Army and the 43rd Army of Reserve Front.

Early on the morning of September 30 the XXXXVII and XXIV Motorized Corps on the left wing of 2nd Panzer Group went on the offensive. In the first days the attack's success was greater than its planners most optimistic expectations. By 1700 hours on October 2 the main belt of defenses of Reserve Front had been totally breached. 50th Army had been attacked on its entire front, and the German forces scored their greatest success against the right-flank 217th Division, which was trying to defend a sector 46km wide. At the same time the 2nd Army's XIII Army Corps attacked in the direction of Zhizdra, trying to envelop the same flank. Yeryomenko took measures to counter these moves but it was difficult to maneuver reserves under conditions of German air superiority. On the same date Maj. I. Shabalin, the head of 50th Army's political section, wrote:

A continuous rumble of enemy artillery can be heard, and masses of their aircraft are flying overhead – our antiaircraft guns are shooting at them constantly. It is clear we are facing a major assault along our whole front, and in many sectors our troops have already been pushed back.

At 1835 on October 5 the STAVKA approved a plan to withdraw 50th Army to the second defensive belt to the west of Bryansk. This move was intended to cut off the German forces that had broken through to Oryol and to keep Bryansk and Karachev in Soviet hands. However, the German command wasn't planning to take Bryansk from the west, preferring instead a double envelopment of the Front's main forces. By now the divisions of XXXXIII Army Corps were continuing to advance, striving to turn the right flank of the Army from the north and link up with XXXXVII Motorized attacking from the south. On October 6 Zhizdra was taken, and later in the day Bryansk itself was seized. 50th Army, along with most of the remaining forces of the Front, were now encircled. The next day, General Petrov was given temporary command of Bryansk Front after Yeryomenko was wounded.

The chief task of the renamed 2nd Panzer Army was to make a rapid advance through Tula to crossings on the Oka River. At the same time it was to, as far as possible, prevent the escape of 50th Army's retreating columns. Petrov had, in fact, been tasked with withdrawing all three of the Front's armies beyond the Voroshilovo Station–Ponyri–Lgov line. Despite this, by the end of October 7 the encircled troops continued to hold onto their front, with 50th Army in the vicinity of Bryansk. During the night they began moving out in a northeastern direction, where there were large gaps in the German lines; they did not have sufficient forces at hand to create a solid inner ring of encirclement. On October 9 the 2nd Army's 113th Infantry Division linked up with 18th Panzer Division northeast of Bryansk. Now the main forces of the Front were split, with the bulk of 50th Army in the northern grouping. 2nd Army was ordered to liquidate this grouping. The troops of 50th Army on October 10 and 11 continued to retreat along its allotted route, as a rule at night, exploiting the still-present gaps.

During these two days the Army completed a 50 km march to the east before running into significant German resistance. On October 12 units of the Army engaged a strong German grouping, approaching from the direction of Oryol, which blocked its path to the east and southeast. Savage fighting developed. By the end of October 13 the Army had reached the line Podbuzhe–Karachev, and had assembled in the Batagovo station–Buyanovichi area, in order to cross over the Resseta River and to prepare a breakout. The river, with a depth of 3m and a boggy basin, had no bridges. Overnight, feverish work went on to construct bridges and during the next day all the horse-drawn artillery crossed the river; two attempts to cross the tractor-drawn guns failed due to their weight. A flanking detachment turned the German flank, allowing the escaping forces to cover another 5–7km in the southeastward direction. The units had suffered heavy losses, and General Petrov was mortally wounded. By October 23 remnants of the 258th and six other rifle divisions, a tank brigade, and several other units emerged from encirclement in the Belyov area. 50th Army and supporting units had lost approximately 90,000 personnel, but more than 12,000 had managed to break out to their own side.

== Defense of Tula ==
By 1000 hours on October 25 the forces that had gathered at Belyov had passed through the line from Chelyuskino to Manaenki. 50th Army headquarters was located in Tula. Bryansk Front assessed that the German armies would attempt to capture Tula en route to Moscow and on the same date issued its Directive No. 316 ordering the Army, now with nine rifle divisions, one tank and one cavalry division, plus formations from the former 26th Army, to fall back by October 30 under the cover of rearguards to the line: Pavshino–Sloboda–Krapivna–Plavsk–Novo-Pokrovskoe–Novosil–Verkhove. In order to cover Tula from the west, on October 24 the leading elements of 194th Rifle Division, numbering about 4,500 men, were moved forward toward Belyov. This division, part of 49th Army in Reserve Front, had been loaded on trains to reinforce Bryansk Front on October 2, but as the German offensive became more widespread the move was interrupted and only a portion of its forces reached their destination. Later on, the 194th group of forces managed to prevent German forces from crossing over to the east bank of the Upa River. In November the group would be incorporated into the 258th.

At this time the Army's divisions varied considerably in size, but averaged about 1,000 personnel each. By the end of October 29 the 258th defended with part of its forces the northern outskirts of Tula, while the remainder was concentrated inside the city; the 154th Rifle Division was concentrated there as well. The breakthrough to Tula and the crossings over the Oka was to be carried out by the reinforced XXIV Panzer Corps. These forces were to advance on the city from the south on November 10, take it, and move to the east. The defense was aided by field fortifications which had been built starting on October 20 by the civil population. Tula had long been a major center of arms production and its factories were drawn on for the resupply and repair of the Army's weapons.

From October 30 to November 6 German forces attempted to capture Tula by means of a frontal blow from the south. Mixed groups of infantry and tanks began attacking on the morning of October 30 as elements of the 217th and 154th Divisions were arriving. The Tula Combat Sector had 4,400-4,500 men under command by the end of the day. 50th Army was being reinforced by the 32nd Tank Brigade and 413th Rifle Division during this time which allowed it to reestablish communications with 49th Army to its north. The reinforcements went over to the counterattack at dawn on November 7, under cover of fire from the 258th from the northwest and the 194th from the west, but this developed slowly due to active German resistance and inexperience on the Soviet side and made no permanent gains. As of 1800 hours on November 10, 50th Army was subordinated to Western Front.

Over the following week the German forces focused on again breaking communications between the two Soviet armies in an effort to encircle Tula. On November 12 the 258th and the 31st Cavalry Division attacked the German flank and rear in the direction of Nikulino and Sukhodol. The next day the 194th joined the attack; the objective was to eliminate a German grouping in the area of the Nikulinskie settlements and the White Woods. As a result, at 0400 on November 15 the two rifle divisions captured Yesipovo. The next morning the 258th, with 31st Cavalry, was fighting to take Bizyukino, as the 194th continued a battle for Glebovo. On the same date Kombrig Trubnikov was moved to command of the 217th Division. He would have his rank modernized to major general on January 2, 1942 and ended the war with the rank of colonel general. He would lead the 10th Guards Army for several months in 1943, but mainly served as a deputy commander of several formations under Marshal K. K. Rokossovskii. He was replaced the next day by Col. Mikhail Aleksandrovich Siyazov when his 194th Division was merged with the 258th. This officer, who had also been imprisoned during the Great Purge, would be promoted to major general on January 2.

By November 22 the 2nd Panzer Army had captured Stalinogorsk and Tula was deeply outflanked but its defenses were continuing to hold and the German troops were severely worn down, still lacking clothing and equipment for winter warfare. On the same date, Lt. Gen. I. V. Boldin took over command of 50th Army. At the end of the month the Front command demanded that Boldin aid the 49th Army's left flank with forces of the 258th. On December 2 Western Front gradually began going over to the counteroffensive. Boldin received orders late that day to destroy the German forces (3rd and 4th Panzer Divisions) advancing on Rudnevo.

=== Tula Offensive Operation ===
When the full counteroffensive began a few days later the 50th Army had the 258th, 290th, 154th, 413th, and 340th Rifle Divisions under command, plus 31st Cavalry and 112th Tank Divisions, three tank brigades and two tank battalions, and a total of 120 field and antitank guns. In the Tula area it was facing units of the 296th and probably the 112th Infantry Divisions. By the morning of December 8 the Army had reached the line Ploshchanka–Mikhailkovo–Kolodeznaya and was preparing to continue the offensive in conjunction with 1st Guards Cavalry Corps and 10th Army. 50th Army, in particular, had the possibility of launching a blow from the Tula area to the south and southeast to cut the retreat route of three panzer divisions and the 167th Infantry Division.

In response to a Front directive that morning, Boldin ordered the 258th to throw back the German forces it faced to secure the right flank of the Army's main forces:

a) the 258th Rifle Division, along with a battery from an independent guards mortar battalion, with a covering force along the [line] Man'shino-Ketri, is to launch a blow in the direction of Aleshnya and Voskresenskoe, with the task by the close of December 8 of taking Aleshnya and then reaching the western bend of the Upa River along the Pavshino-Sloboda sector.

During the morning of December 9, carrying out these orders, the division captured Ploshchanka and Pommogalovo, despite repeated counterattacks from the Izvol area toward Zanino.

On the morning of December 11 the Front issued a new directive in an effort to cut off the enemy retreat, but this did not directly affect the division, whose tasks remained basically unchanged. During the afternoon it reached a line 2km east of Pavshino to 3–5km east of Baboshino. By the end of the next day, elements of the division reached the Upa along the Poreche–Sloboda sector while its forward detachments had reached Voskresenskoe, cutting the Odoevo road in this area. In the following days the division's main forces began regrouping in the western and southwestern directions, so as to carry out new tasks.

The highly worn out units of 2nd Panzer Army continued their retreat to the south and southwest. In the period after December 13 the missions of 50th Army remained essentially unchanged: in conjunction with 1st Guards Cavalry it was to continue the offensive in the direction of Shchekino with the objective of destroying the German Tula group, and by the close of December 15 reach the line Plastovo–Zhitovo with its main forces. Units of the 258th, having broken German resistance along the Upa, in the Pavshino area, by 1100 hours on December 16 had reached the line Berezovo–Krasnaya Zarya–Ivanovka, 1km southwest of Pavshino, after capturing all three locales. It then ran into stubborn German resistance in the Andreevskoe area and pulled back its right flank toward Pavshino. Over 10 days the Army had advanced between 25–30km.

==== Advance to Kaluga ====
On December 18 the 50th Army was attacking to the northwest and west from the line Vysokoe–Dubna–Voskresenskoe, and the 258th took Vysokoe with its center forces while its right flank fought for Khovanskaya and its left fought for Lobzha. The operational plan of Western Front called for the Army to direct its advance toward Kaluga, but German resistance was growing. At about this time General Boldin was ordered to form a mobile group to take the city by surprise. This consisted of two regiments of the 154th Division, the 112th Tanks, two batteries of guards mortars, and a flamethrower/incendiary company and other small units. The operations of the mobile group were to be secured from the north by the 258th, which was to reach the front from Akhlebnino to Zyabki to Pleshkovo by December 20. The group would have to cover more than 80km while piercing the German defense, for a rate of more than 30km per day.

By the end of December 20 the mobile group had reached to within 2km south of Kaluga. The 258th, overcoming stubborn resistance from the 31st Infantry along the Titovo–Lobzha sector, advanced extremely slowly. The defenders had prepared an all-round defense on time and head-on attacks were unsuccessful and led to excessive losses. Colonel Siyazov resorted to the method of surrounding separate strongpoints and blocking them. On the morning of December 21 the division was continuing to fight on its right flank in the area of Menshikovo-Verkhovoe, and with its center and left flank was encircling the German group in the area of Kutkovo. By the end of the day the division had captured the above locales and was developing the offensive to the northwest. The defenders put up especially stubborn resistance from the Gryaznovo area, holding the offensive with the support of artillery, mortars, and tanks. By this time the 340th Division was tasked with assisting the 258th, moving one regiment forward in the direction of Pozdnyakovo.

On December 23, as the mobile group battled for Kaluga, the 258th moved forward in heavy fighting, by 1100 bypassing Makarovo from the northeast. This became easier after an advance by 290th Division, allowing the 258th to move toward the Romodanovo–Zhelybino area (6 km west of Kaluga) in order to envelop the city from that direction. While one of the division's regiments battled for Zabelino and Makarovo the remaining two rifle regiments were moving into the area southwest of Kaluga; one passed through Yelovka on the morning of December 24 while the other passed through Zyabki at noon, meeting little resistance. By now 50th Army had advanced about 110–120km since the start of the counteroffensive.

The morning of December 26 saw the division fighting in the area of Annenka, Zhelybino, and Romodanovo against firm resistance. The German forces, supported by tanks and artillery, repeatedly counterattacked. This fighting continued up to December 29, when the 258th had concentrated its main forces in the area of Kvan and Verkhovaya for a blow at Kaluga from the southwest; part of its forces were battling for Zhelybino and the sanatorium 1,000m west of the city. On the morning of the next day the direct fighting for Kaluga entered its decisive phase, and it was liberated before noon, with retreating German forces falling back to the northwest and west. The battle had cost the German Army 7,000 killed and prisoners, plus considerable equipment and supplies captured. On this date the temperature reached -30 degrees C. 50th Army was directed to pursue the defeated German grouping toward Yukhnov. The 290th and 258th Divisions and the 32nd Tank Brigade, with attached units, were to attack along the front from Pyatkovskaya to Karavai, some 18km northwest of Kaluga. On January 2, 1942, Siyazov was promoted to the rank of major general, and three days later the 258th "Uzbek" Rifle Division was redesignated as the 12th Guards Rifle Division. Siyazov would go on to command several Guards rifle and rifle corps during and after the war before moving to the training establishment. He retired in June 1956.

== 2nd Formation ==
A new 258th Rifle Division was formed on April 25, 1942, based on the 1st formation of the 43rd Rifle Brigade, at Mozhaysk in the Moscow Military District.

=== 43rd Rifle Brigade ===
This brigade began forming at Novosibirsk in the Siberian Military District in October 1941, based on training units and military students. It was sent west in late November and on November 29 it was assigned to the 20th Army, which was forming in Moscow. In December it was reassigned to 5th Army in Western Front, which had already started advancing in the great Moscow counteroffensive. The brigade's first offensive action was on January 17, 1942, when it went into action as part of 336th Rifle Division in 5th Army. From January to April the brigade fought along the Moscow–Minsk highway, but apart from putting continuous pressure on the German forces the Soviets could not accomplish anything dramatic on this front. In April the 43rd was returned to 5th Army's rear area at Mozhaysk to be reformed as the new 258th.

Once it completed forming the division had an order of battle fairly similar to that of the 1st formation:

- 405th Rifle Regiment
- 991st Rifle Regiment
- 999th Rifle Regiment
- 782nd Artillery Regiment
- 342nd Antitank Battalion
- 315th Antiaircraft Battery
- 361st Reconnaissance Company
- 557th Sapper Battalion
- 737th Signal Battalion
- 305th Medical/Sanitation Battalion
- 370th Chemical Defense (Anti-gas) Company
- 432nd Motor Transport Company
- 417th Field Bakery
- 72nd Divisional Veterinary Hospital
- 1601st Field Postal Station
- 717th Field Office of the State Bank

The first commander appointed was Lt. Col. Gerontii Nesterovich Tsitayshvili, but he was replaced on May 2 by Lt. Col. Pyotr Selvestrovich Khaustovich, who would be promoted to the rank of colonel on August 25. The new division was under command of the Moscow Military District, and then the headquarters of the Moscow Defence Zone until July for training. From late July until early September it was in the reserves of Voronezh Front, and on September 13 it was assigned to the 1st Guards Army in Don Front.

== Kotluban Offensives ==
On September 15 the 258th reported a personnel strength of 13,429, the largest in 1st Guards, although five of the Army's divisions were reduced from previous combat in 24th or 66th Army. Despite its strength the division lacked its full complement of mortars, machine guns, and wheeled transport.

=== Second Kotluban Offensive ===
By mid-September roughly half of German 6th Army was engaged in urban combat within Stalingrad. This led the STAVKA to believe its flanks outside the city were vulnerable while, in fact, its forces on those sectors were deeply entrenched and heavily fortified. On September 12, General Zhukov had directed General Yeryomenko, now in command of Stalingrad Front, to conduct another offensive with his three left-flank armies, beginning on September 18. This was to be aimed at the juncture between VIII Army Corps and XIV Panzer Corps. The sector was defended by only the 230th Infantry Regiment, two reconnaissance battalions, and the 9th Machine Gun Battalion. Mitigating against this advantage, the terrain south of Kotluban would again require Yeryomenko's forces to attack across open steppe; only darkness and the numerous balkas (ravines) offered any concealment from German fire.

Yeryomenko selected a 17km-wide sector from 564 km Station on the main railroad line to Stalingrad to the Kotluban Balka as his offensive target. This required a considerable regrouping in which 24th Army and 1st Guards, which was under command of Maj. Gen. K. S. Moskalenko, exchanged sectors, along with considerable forces. His Army had three supporting tank corps, but these had lost many of their medium and heavy types in earlier fighting. Its mission was to attack southward, rupture the German defense at the boundary of the two Corps, and exploit to the south along the Borodkin–Nadezhda axis to link up with 62nd Army's forces in the Gumrak region. The 24th and 66th Armies were to launch supporting attacks on its flanks. Moskalenko formed two echelons, with the main shock group on the left wing. On this group's right, the 258th and 173rd Rifle Divisions were to advance in the sector east of the Balka, defeat the forces on 76th Infantry Division's right wing, and exploit west of Borodkin to protect the main shock group's right flank. 4th Tank Corps and two rifle divisions formed the second echelon.

The offensive began at 0700 hours on September 18 after firing a largely ineffective 90-minute artillery preparation and despite a massive Soviet advantage in manpower and armor quickly ran into difficulties. The defenders had established the type of defense-in-depth they had pioneered in WWI. Most of the shellfire had fallen on the lightly-held forward positions, doing little damage, and the main German positions then poured machine gun, mortar, and artillery fire on the attackers from the high ground farther back. By sheer determination the 258th made one of the deepest penetrations, as much as 3km in places, and late in the day the Army reported, in part:

258th RD was fighting along the northern slope of Hill 107.2 and the northwestern slope of Hill 123.6 (7 kilometres northeast of Bol'shaia Rossoshka) line.

Hastily assembled armored battle groups from 60th and 3rd Motorized Divisions had brought the main shock group to an abrupt standstill in the early afternoon, before going over to the counterattack. By the end of the next day the 1st Guards Army had lost about 36,000 of its original 123,000 personnel killed, wounded, or missing in action. As a result of these reports, Stalin intervened in the planning of September 19, instructing Zhukov to alter the form and direction of the offensive. Owing in part to the relative success of 258th and 173rd Divisions the 1st Guards Army's main axis of attack was shifted west to both sides of the Kotluban Balka. These divisions were reinforced with the 273rd Rifle Division, and supported on the left by the 260th Division and on the right by the 298th Rifle Division. Armor support included 50 tanks from three tank brigades and about 45 tanks from 16th Tank Corps. The new shock group completed concentrating late on September 22 and the offensive resumed with little greater success at 0630 hours the next day. The Red Army General Staff summed up late in the day, in part:

258th RD repelled seven counterattacks by the enemy and was fighting along a line from the northeastern slope of Hill 107.2 to a point 2 kilometres northeast of that hill. Up to a battalion of enemy infantry and 35 tanks were destroyed.

It had advanced between 2-2.5km. The next day saw considerably better progress, with the shock group finally breaking through the German forward defenses by day's end; the 273rd Division with 16th Tanks captured Hill 130.4 from 76th Infantry. The 258th suffered the loss of Colonel Khaustovich, who was heavily wounded. He would be hospitalized until May 1943 and would later lead the 220th Rifle Division. Colonel Grigorii Kuzmich Miroshnichenko took over for a few days, but on September 29 he was moved to the 260th Division and was replaced by Col. Ivan Yakovlevich Fursin. This officer had reached the rank of Kombrig in November 1939 while commanding the 8th Rifle Division, but on February 19, 1940, during the Winter War, he had lost his command and was demoted to colonel. He came to the 258th after serving as chief of staff of 1st Shock Army.

1st Guards Army had ground to a halt by late on September 26, primarily due to intense German airstrikes and strong local counterattacks. By the end of the previous day the 16th Tanks reported having only 14 vehicles operational (three T-34s and 11 T-60s). Moskalenko's Army repeatedly assaulted the 76th Infantry's positions until October 4, with ever weaker forces and lower success. The only justification was diverting pressure from 62nd Army in the city. From September 20–26 the 1st Guards lost 2,009 killed, 7,097 wounded, 1,320 missing in action and 186 to other causes, a total of 10,612. By the beginning of October the new Don Front had been formed and the 1st Guards Army had come under its command.

=== Third Kotluban Offensive ===
The STAVKA ordered a new offensive by Rokossovskii's Don Front at 2305 hours on October 7. The battle began on October 9 and involved 1st Guards and 24th Armies. The 258th attacked in the vicinity of Hill 123.6 but achieved no success. The next day the division tried to resume its attacks from 1100 to 1130 but made no gains and was fighting in its previous positions. The offensive was soon shut down. On October 18, Moskalenko was reassigned to command of 40th Army and on the 21st the 1st Guards Army headquarters was ordered to relocate. Its divisions were reassigned with most, including the 258th, going to 24th Army. On the same day the 4th Tank Army, also in Don Front, was redesignated as 65th Army, under command of Lt. Gen. P. I. Batov.

== Operation Uranus ==
Operation Uranus. Note positions of 65th Army.

By this time planning for a decisive counteroffensive against German 6th Army (and much of 4th Panzer Army) was well advanced. This would involve Stalingrad, Don, and Southwestern Fronts in a double envelopment of the German positions in and west of the city. On November 14 the STAVKA issued a critique of Rokossovskii's regrouping of his Front, in part:

3. During the transfer of 252nd and 258th RDs and 27th Gds. RD to 65th Army, the transport means were meagre and the front's transport means assisting 65th Army were also inadequate: [specifically] on 6 November, 29 of 50 allocated vehicles turned out to be inoperable, and the transport of all kinds is being carried out with interruptions (owing to poor supply, 252nd and 258th RDs and 27th Gds. RD have only 62-63% of their required combat load...)

At least the 258th had not lost men due to absence of warm clothing as had the others. The division would still be under 65th Army at the start of the offensive on November 19.

In the planning for the operation, 21st Army was to have a leading role in breaking out of the Kletskaya bridgehead, but the 65th was to provide support on its left. Due to the heavy casualties the 258th had suffered at Kotluban it was in Batov's second echelon. In the first days the Army's units played a largely sacrificial role, attacking the defenses of XI Army Corps frontally to cover the rapid advance of 21st Army. The 258th was committed later in the day on November 21, joining the 27th Guards, 252nd, 304th and 321st Rifle Divisions in grinding their way forward against fierce resistance from the 376th Infantry Division.

Attacking shortly after dawn on November 22 the right wing of 65th Army, including the 258th, struck the defenses of 376th Infantry and 14th Panzer Divisions in the sector from Logovskii southward to Verkhne-Buzinovka. Fursin's troops launched heavy assaults against the 376th's positions just east of Orekhovskii, which were supported by 20 tanks of 14th Panzer. After hours of heavy fighting, at about 1000 hours, the commander of the 376th ordered his troops to abandon Logovskii and conduct a fighting withdrawal eastward about 5 km to a new defense line. Batov's forces pursued, and heavy combat continued into the afternoon. Finally, shortly before nightfall, under heavy pressure from several directions, the two German divisions were ordered to fall back further to a ridgeline from roughly 2 km west of Nizhnaya Perekopka southward to about 2km west of Oskinskii. These advances set up the prospect that the entire XI Corps and most of XIV Panzer Corps could be encircled on the west bank of the Don. It would be up to the 24th Army to complete this coup. In the event, several timely withdrawals across the Don foiled this plan, but at the cost of falling deeper into another trap. On the same day, some distance to the south, Southwestern and Stalingrad Fronts completed the main encirclement of 6th Army.

Throughout the day on November 23, 65th Army continued to pound the depleted divisions of XI Corps as they withdrew from their salient west of the Don south of Sirotinskaya. The 258th captured Ventsii and Perekopskii from the 673rd Regiment of 376th Infantry and then advanced to end the day roughly km north-northeast of Golubaya. The next day Batov's Army continued to apply unrelenting pressure against XI Corps' shrinking perimeter west of the Don. During the day his main shock group's 252nd, 27th Guards, and 258th Divisions forced the 14th Panzer and 44th Infantry Divisions to withdraw eastward. By nightfall the three Soviet divisions reached positions overlooking Sukhaya Golubaya Balka. While the XI Corps' bridgehead was shrinking, it was not being encircled.

=== Reducing the Pocket ===
In accordance with orders received from the STAVKA the previous day, on November 27 the 258th, 321st and 40th Guards Rifle Divisions from 65th Army began to redeploy southward to reinforce Southwestern Front's 5th Tank Army's forces struggling to seize the German strongpoints of Oblivskaya and Surovikino on the Chir River and Rychkovsky on the Don. By the end of November 28 the 258th was operating some 11–14km northwest of Rychkovsky in the Liska River valley. The next day it attacked in the Novomaksimovskii sector on the right of 1st Tank Corps but made no progress whatsoever against the German Group Goebbel. At this time the division's strength was down to about 6,500 personnel.

5th Tank Army continued to struggle along the Chir into early December. It was recorded at this time that the division's personnel were roughly 50 percent Russian, 30 percent Turkmen, and 20 percent penal troops. On December 8 a new 5th Shock Army, under command of Lt. Gen. M. M. Popov, was formed in the area, consisting of 4th Guards, 258th, 300th, 315th, and 87th Rifle Divisions, 4th Mechanized Corps, 7th and 23rd Tank Corps, and 3rd Guards Cavalry Corps. Its task was to "destroy the enemy's Nizhne-Chirskaya and Tormosin groupings in cooperation with 5th Tank Army" as well as to prevent any relief of the Stalingrad pocket from this area; this was considered more likely than the operation that eventually began on the Kotelnikovo axis. 5th Shock became fully operational overnight on December 11–12 when the 4th Guards and 258th came under command.

On December 9 the 258th was on the right flank of the new Army, facing elements of 336th Infantry Division in the Lisinsky area. During December 11 the division attacked across the Chir in cooperation with the 6th Guards Cavalry Division and a brigade of the 1st Tank Corps and took Lisinsky; a force of about 15 tanks then got into the rear of the 336th's 685th Regiment. This and another incursion of tanks by 5th Mechanized Corps near Surovikino forced the local German command to call on XXXXVIII Panzer Corps for assistance. The next day roughly half of the 15th Panzer Regiment of 11th Panzer Division intervened, smashed the exploiting tanks and assisted the 336th in retaking Lisinsky in the afternoon. While this was a setback, it further eroded the strength of the prospective relief force.

=== Tormosin Offensive ===
On December 13 the 5th Shock went over to the offensive in a determined effort to eliminate the German forces at Rychkovsky and Verkhne-Chirsky near the confluence of the Don and the Chir. They were especially taken by surprise by a savage assault by 7th Tank Corps, assisted by the 258th and 4th Guards. The 3rd Guards Heavy Tank Brigade was committed through the positions of the left wing of the 258th at 0700 hours. The combined attack captured Rychkovsky after two weeks of futile efforts, and the XXXXVIII Panzer Corps war diary stated late in the day that it was lost "irrevocably", which effectively spelled the end of the bridgehead east of the Don. Meanwhile, on the Tank Corps' right the division attacked Group Goebbel's defenses at the approaches to Verkhne-Chirsky but recorded no appreciable progress against determined resistance.

Overnight, General Popov visited the command post of 7th Tank Corps, listened to the report of its commander, Maj. Gen. P. A. Rotmistrov, and ordered him to complete his task. Rotmistrov reinforced the 258th with a tank brigade and 3rd Guards Cavalry Corps with a motorized rifle brigade. However, the mechanized troops were not to cross the Chir, because the same evening the LVII Panzer Corps had begun its drive from Kotelnikovo and the armor might be needed to counter this. Verkhne-Chirsky was heavily fortified and held by as many as 3,500 Axis troops under several commands. The initial assault by 3rd Guards Tanks and 7th Motorized Brigade began at 0730 and continued all day without full success. The 258th also faced very heavy resistance and failed to achieve its missions. Rotmistrov ordered the attack resumed at 0200 on December 15 in an effort to surprise the defenders, and generated equally heavy fighting until 0400. During the day the 258th, 47th Guards and 5th Guards Cavalry Division conducted an assault on a roughly 10km-wide sector from Verkhne-Chirsky westward through Eritskii to the east bank of the Chir north of Kulpinskii. By the end of the day Verkhne-Chirsky had been taken, and Surovikino had fallen to 5th Tank Army.

Over the following days the 258th and 315th Divisions kept up pressure on the defenses of 336th and 384th Infantry Divisions in the Ostrovskii bridgehead and southwest of Verkhne-Chirsky. This diverted their attention from developments to the south, which began on December 29 against the weak German groups screening the right wing of Group Mieth. The STAVKA was concerned about the German Tormosin grouping that was wedged in between the twin large-scale offensives being conducted by Southwestern and Stalingrad Fronts. The 5th Shock and 2nd Guards Armies were directed to take this objective beginning in a headlong advance beginning overnight on December 29/30. At this time the Stalingrad Front was renamed as a new Southern Front, and provision was made that, once Tormosin was liberated, the 5th Shock would be transferred to this Front. During the next two days the Nizhne-Chirskaya area was captured by the 258th and 315th Divisions, with the former completely clearing Lisinsky, after heavy street fighting, by 2330 hours on December 31.

=== Offensive on Rostov ===
The division followed 5th Shock to the new Front on January 3, 1943. At this time the 2nd Guards Army was finishing clearing Group Mieth from the Tormosin region and began pursuing them towards the Tsimla River. In order to improve command and control of his forces north of the Don the Front commander, General Yeryomenko, formed an operational group under Lt. Gen. Ya. G. Kreizer consisting of 5th Shock and the right wing forces of 2nd Guards. Kreizer's group consolidated its positions along the Kumshak River overnight on January 3/4, then resumed its advance. As of January 7 Group Mieth was taking up positions along the Kagalnik River as the Soviet group prepared to advance from that line to the Northern Donets. Group Mieth was defending the town of Konstantinovskii on its right flank with just one battalion, but this was reinforced as elements of the 11th Panzer Division began to arrive.

In the fighting on January 7 the 5th Shock faced two regiments of the 336th Infantry and part of the 384th Infantry, reinforced by two battalions of the 7th Luftwaffe Field Division. The 315th and 258th Divisions found a gap in the defense, crossed the frozen Kagalnik and penetrated 8km, threatening to encircle the 384th Infantry. 4th Guards, which was the Army's reserve, advanced into the gap. In response the weak 22nd Panzer Division was ordered to attack southward while 11th Panzer continued to concentrate south of the penetration. This led to a running battle from January 9–11 involving numerous German counterattacks which included the 7th Panzer Division starting on the 10th. At 0800 hours that day a report stated that the three rifle divisions "occupied the Alifanov - Novo-Rossoshinskii - Chumakov - Rossoshinskii - Kriukovskii (38km south of Tatsinskaia) region." 7th Panzer was a significant force with over 100 tanks, but had only limited time to inflict as much damage as possible since its presence was also required elsewhere. 5th Shock Army later reported:

On 10 January 1943, the enemy attacked the units of 258th RD and 4th Guards RD with the forces of up to a regiment of infantry and 100 tanks and, having created the threat of their complete encirclement, forced the latter to withdraw to Trofimov and Kriukovskii. On the night of 10–11 January 1943, 1328th and 362nd RRs of 315th RD, together with units of 258th RD and 4th Gds. RD, began a fighting withdrawal to the line of the Kagalnik River. Beginning at first light on 11 January 1943, the enemy continued to attack the withdrawing units of 315th and 258th RDs and 4th Gds. RD with a force of motorized infantry with a large number of tanks.

All three divisions suffered significant losses in this fighting and were withdrawn to the rear for rebuilding, which in the case of the 258th continued until at least January 24. One of the casualties was Colonel Fursin, who was severely wounded on January 11 and hospitalized on the 16th. His convalescence continued into late September and he never returned to the front, serving in several administrative posts until his retirement in September 1949. He was replaced by Col. Semyon Samuilovich Levin, who had previously served with the division. This officer would remain in command for the duration of the 2nd formation.

==== Advance to the Mius ====
Hitler finally authorized Field Marshal E. von Manstein to withdraw his forces from the eastern Donbas, including Rostov-na-Donu, on February 6. On the same day multiple battalions of the division and of the 4th and 40th Guards Rifle Divisions attacked across the Northern Donets near the boundary between the German 336th and 384th Infantry Divisions which produced heavy fighting but only meagre gains in an attempt to liberate the villages of Aparinskii and Krestovskii. The German withdrawal to the Mius River line began on February 8, taking 5th Shock by surprise, and was completed by February 18. During the Soviet advance the division reached positions 3km west of Lokhmatenskie Kurgan on the 9th, with its forward detachment at Zagotskot, 5km southwest of that place. Its headquarters was at Krymskii. On February 11 it captured Kerchik at 1300 hours and continued to advance toward Markin.

Late on February 14, 5th Shock reported that the 258th, with the 764th Tank Destroyer Regiment and 1162nd Gun Artillery Regiment, had concentrated in the Nikutova region in its second echelon by 0600 hours, advanced through Shevchenko at 1800 hours, and by 2200 was located 4km west of that place en route to Gorelyi Kurgan. Its orders for the next day were to remain concentrated in second echelon to protect the Army's right flank and do reconnaissance in an area 23-33km northeast of Matveyev Kurgan. During February 16 it was ordered to cut the high road running to Diakovo and Kuibyshevo by the end of the day; its lead column reached the road crossing (4km south of Novyi Sambek) by 1400 hours. By now it was approaching Agrafenovka, and was directed to concentrate at Kuibyshevo by the end of the next day. Continuing in the Army's second echelon, the division was ordered to be in Bespavlovskii (32km northwest of Matveyev Kurgan) by the end of February 19.

By February 21, 5th Shock reached the Mius. On March 3 the Army was fortifying the scant bridgeheads it had taken on the west bank of the river, and the advance halted for the coming months. The 258th remained in 5th Shock Army into April and May, and it was recognized on May 4 for its role in the liberation of the lower Don basin and eastern Donbas when it was redesignated as the 96th Guards Rifle Division. For his leadership of the 62nd Rifle Division in the Vistula–Oder offensive and the East Prussian offensive in 1945, Colonel Levin would be made a Hero of the Soviet Union on June 27.

== 3rd Formation ==
The final formation of the 258th took place on July 28, 1943 in the 25th Army of Far Eastern Front, based on the 157th Eastern Rifle Regiment. Its order of battle was very similar to that of the 2nd formation:

- 405th Rifle Regiment
- 991st Rifle Regiment
- 999th Rifle Regiment
- 782nd Artillery Regiment
- 342nd Antitank Battalion
- 465th Self-propelled Artillery Battalion (in 1945)
- 361st Reconnaissance Company
- 557th Sapper Battalion
- 737th Signal Battalion (later 1475th Signal Company)
- 305th Medical/Sanitation Battalion
- 370th Chemical Defense (Anti-gas) Company
- 432nd Motor Transport Company
- 417th Field Bakery
- 72nd Divisional Veterinary Hospital
- 3844th Field Postal Station
- 1863rd Field Office of the State Bank

The first commander assigned, on the day it formed, was Col. Andrei Afanasievich Chartorizhskii. He would remain in this position until August 12, 1944. On August 24 he was replaced by Lt. Col. Afanasii Antonovich Zelenkov; this officer would be promoted to the rank of colonel on February 20, 1945. He in turn was replaced on April 4 by Col. Afanasii Antonovich Zelenkov, who would remain in command into peacetime. In August 1943 the division was assigned to the 88th Rifle Corps in 25th Army, joining the 105th Rifle Division and the 6th Rifle Brigade. It would remain in this Corps for the duration of the war. In common with many other rifle divisions in the Far East it received a battalion (21 armored vehicles) of SU-76s in 1945 to provide mobile firepower in a largely roadless region.

=== Soviet invasion of Manchuria ===
At the beginning of June, 25th Army and its considerably enlarged 88th Corps was in the Primorsky Group of Forces. By July the Corps, now reduced to just its original 258th and 105th Divisions, was in the reserves of the Group of Forces. On August 9, when the Manchurian operation began, it remained in reserve, but now in 1st Far Eastern Front.

On August 11 the 105th left the Corps and was replaced by the 386th Rifle Division; the Corps was now reassigned to 25th Army. On the previous two days advance units of the 108th and 113th Fortified Regions had captured Japanese positions across the Hunchun and Tumen rivers, north of the old 1938 battlefield at Lake Khasan. 88th Corps was committed to support the fortified regions and advanced on the Hunchun–Tumen axis. By August 14 Hunchun was taken by 113th Fortified Region, but as it advanced toward the Inanho River it faced heavy opposition from the Japanese 112th Infantry Division. Late the next day the 258th, from Corps second echelon, crossed the Tumen at Hunyong to attack the Japanese right flank. On August 16 the division continued to drive westward, south of the Tumen, against heavy opposition from Japanese forces holding the hills southwest of Mayusan. Elements of the 113th Fortified Region extended their operations eastward on the 386th's right flank but ran into the remainder of the Japanese 112th, which held its positions, but by now was encircled on three sides by 25th Army. On the 17th the ring closed around the 112th and its neighboring 79th Infantry Division as 39th Rifle Corps secured Tumen while 88th Corps pushed aside a regiment of the 79th Infantry at Mayusan and occupied Onsang, 10km east of Tumen. Remaining Japanese units surrendered or fled into the hills south of the Tumen River.

With the official Japanese surrender pending, on August 18 the 88th Corps, supported by the 10th Mechanized Corps, continued to clear northeastern Korea south of Yenchi and Tumen. Through the rest of the month these two forces advanced south into the Korean peninsula, finally reaching the 38th parallel, the line agreed upon by the Soviet and American authorities for separation their occupation forces. On September 19 the 258th was recognized for its service in the campaign with the award of the Order of the Red Banner. The division was disbanded as part of the 88th Corps of the 25th Army in August 1946.
