= Starikovsky =

Starikovsky Стариковский
- Khutor
- Location within Volgograd Oblast Location within Russia
- Coordinates: 48°38′N 42°47′E
- Country: Russia
- Region: Volgograd Oblast
- District: Surovikinsky District
- Time zone: UTC+4:00

Starikovsky (Russian: Стариковский) is a rural locality (a khutor) in Nizhneosinovskoye Rural Settlement, Surovikinsky District, Volgograd Oblast, Russia. The population was 44 as of 2010.

== Geography ==
Starikovsky is located 9 km northwest of Surovikino (the district's administrative centre) by road. Nizhneosinovsky is the nearest rural locality.
