= Plesistovsky =

Plesistovsky Плесистовский
- Khutor
- Location within Volgograd Oblast Location within Russia
- Coordinates: 48°50′N 43°08′E
- Country: Russia
- Region: Volgograd Oblast
- District: Surovikinsky District
- Time zone: UTC+4:00

Plesistovsky (Russian: Плесистовский) is a rural locality (a khutor) in Kachalinskoye Rural Settlement, Surovikinsky District, Volgograd Oblast, Russia. The population was 20 as of 2010.

== Geography ==
Plesistovsky is located 63 km northeast of Surovikino (the district's administrative centre) by road. Mayorovsky is the nearest rural locality.
