= Novomaximovsky =

Novomaximovsky Новомаксимовский
- Khutor
- Location within Volgograd Oblast Location within Russia
- Coordinates: 48°28′N 43°09′E
- Country: Russia
- Region: Volgograd Oblast
- District: Surovikinsky District
- Time zone: UTC+4:00

Novomaximovsky (Russian: Новомаксимовский) is a rural locality (a khutor) and the administrative center of Novomaximovskoye Rural Settlement, Surovikinsky District, Volgograd Oblast, Russia. The population was 1,371 as of 2010. There are 18 streets.

== Geography ==
Novomaximovsky is located on the bank of the Tsimlyansk Reservoir, 52 km southeast of Surovikino (the district's administrative centre) by road. Verkhnechirsky is the nearest rural locality.
