= Popov 1-y =

Popov 1-y Попов 1-й
- Khutor
- Location within Volgograd Oblast Location within Russia
- Coordinates: 48°41′N 43°10′E
- Country: Russia
- Region: Volgograd Oblast
- District: Surovikinsky District
- Time zone: UTC+4:00

Popov 1-y (Russian: Попов 1-й) is a rural locality (a khutor) in Lysovskoye Rural Settlement, Surovikinsky District, Volgograd Oblast, Russia. The population was 50 as of 2010.

== Geography ==
Popov 1-y is located on the Liska River, 32 km northeast of Surovikino (the district's administrative centre) by road. Lysov is the nearest rural locality.
