= Blizhnemelnichny =

Blizhnemelnichny Ближнемельничный
- Khutor
- Location within Volgograd Oblast Location within Russia
- Coordinates: 48°26′N 43°03′E
- Country: Russia
- Region: Volgograd Oblast
- District: Surovikinsky District
- Time zone: UTC+4:00

Blizhnemelnichny (Russian: Ближнемельничный) is a rural locality (a khutor) Nizhnechirskoye Rural Settlement, Surovikinsky District, Volgograd Oblast, Russia. The population was 106 as of 2010.

== Geography ==
Blizhnemelnichny is located 35 km southeast of Surovikino (the district's administrative centre) by road. Blizhnepodgorsky is the nearest rural locality.
