= Zhirkovsky, Surovikinsky District, Volgograd Oblast =

Zhirkovsky Жирковский
- Khutor
- Location within Volgograd Oblast Location within Russia
- Coordinates: 48°38′N 42°55′E
- Country: Russia
- Region: Volgograd Oblast
- District: Surovikinsky District
- Time zone: UTC+4:00

Zhirkovsky (Russian: Жирковский) is a rural locality (a khutor) in Blizhneositinovskoye Rural Settlement, Surovikinsky District, Volgograd Oblast, Russia. The population was 308 as of 2010. There are 6 streets.

== Geography ==
Zhirkovsky is located on the Dobraya River, 9 km northeast of Surovikino (the district's administrative centre) by road. Surovikino is the nearest rural locality.
