= Staroderbenovsky =

Staroderbenovsky Стародербеновский
- Khutor
- Location within Volgograd Oblast Location within Russia
- Coordinates: 48°34′N 42°40′E
- Country: Russia
- Region: Volgograd Oblast
- District: Surovikinsky District
- Time zone: UTC+4:00

Staroderbenovsky (Russian: Стародербеновский) is a rural locality (a khutor) in Sysoyevskoye Rural Settlement, Surovikinsky District, Volgograd Oblast, Russia. The population was 38 as of 2010.

== Geography ==
Staroderbenovsky is located 18 km southwest of Surovikino (the district's administrative centre) by road. Sekretev is the nearest rural locality.
