= Nizhneosinovsky =

Nizhneosinovsky Нижнеосиновский
- Khutor
- Location within Volgograd Oblast Location within Russia
- Coordinates: 48°37′N 42°47′E
- Country: Russia
- Region: Volgograd Oblast
- District: Surovikinsky District
- Time zone: UTC+4:00

Nizhneosinovsky (Russian: Нижнеосиновский) is a rural locality (a khutor) and the administrative center of Nizhneosinovskoye Rural Settlement, Surovikinsky District, Volgograd Oblast, Russia. The population was 750 as of 2010.

== Geography ==
Nizhneosinovsky is located north from A-260 Track, 8 km northwest of Surovikino (the district's administrative centre) by road. Surovikino is the nearest rural locality.
