= Zryanin =

Zryanin Зрянин
- Khutor
- Location within Volgograd Oblast Location within Russia
- Coordinates: 48°38′N 43°10′E
- Country: Russia
- Region: Volgograd Oblast
- District: Surovikinsky District
- Time zone: UTC+4:00

Zryanin (Russian: Зрянин) is a rural locality (a khutor) in Lysovskoye Rural Settlement, Surovikinsky District, Volgograd Oblast, Russia. The population was 27 as of 2010.

== Geography ==
Zryanin is located near the Liska River, 33 km northeast of Surovikino (the district's administrative centre) by road. Lysov is the nearest rural locality.
