= Novoderbenovsky =

Novoderbenovsky Новодербеновский
- Khutor
- Location within Volgograd Oblast Location within Russia
- Coordinates: 48°32′N 42°42′E
- Country: Russia
- Region: Volgograd Oblast
- District: Surovikinsky District
- Time zone: UTC+4:00

Novoderbenovsky (Russian: Новодербеновский) is a rural locality (a khutor) in Sysoyevskoye Rural Settlement, Surovikinsky District, Volgograd Oblast, Russia. The population was 373 as of 2010. There are 6 streets.

== Geography ==
Novoderbenovsky is located 15 km southwest of Surovikino (the district's administrative centre) by road. Staroderbenovsky is the nearest rural locality.
