= Sviridovsky =

Sviridovsky Свиридовский
- Khutor
- Location within Volgograd Oblast Location within Russia
- Coordinates: 48°33′N 42°58′E
- Country: Russia
- Region: Volgograd Oblast
- District: Surovikinsky District
- Time zone: UTC+4:00

Sviridovsky (Russian: Свиридовский) is a rural locality (a khutor) in Blizhneositinovskoye Rural Settlement, Surovikinsky District, Volgograd Oblast, Russia. The population was 115 as of 2010. There are 3 streets.

== Geography ==
Sviridovsky is located on the left bank of the Chir River, 28 km southeast of Surovikino (the district's administrative centre) by road. Ostrovskoy is the nearest rural locality.
