= Kiselev, Volgograd Oblast =

Kiselev Киселев
- Khutor
- Location within Volgograd Oblast Location within Russia
- Coordinates: 48°52′N 42°47′E
- Country: Russia
- Region: Volgograd Oblast
- District: Surovikinsky District
- Time zone: UTC+4:00

Kiselev (Russian: Киселев) is a rural locality (a khutor) in Lobakinskoye Rural Settlement, Surovikinsky District, Volgograd Oblast, Russia. The population was 258 as of 2010. There are 7 streets.

== Geography ==
Kiselev is located on the Dobraya River, 35 km north of Surovikino (the district's administrative centre) by road. Lobakin is the nearest rural locality.
