= Blizhneosinovsky =

Blizhneosinovsky Ближнеосиновский
- Khutor
- Location within Volgograd Oblast Location within Russia
- Coordinates: 48°31′N 43°02′E
- Country: Russia
- Region: Volgograd Oblast
- District: Surovikinsky District
- Time zone: UTC+4:00

Blizhneosinovsky (Russian: Ближнеосиновский) is a rural locality (a khutor) and the administrative center of Blizhneositinovskoye Rural Settlement, Surovikinsky District, Volgograd Oblast, Russia. The population was 639 as of 2010. There are 10 streets.

== Geography ==
Blizhneosinovsky is located on the left bank of the Chir River, 32 km southeast of Surovikino (the district's administrative centre) by road. Buratsky is the nearest rural locality.
