= Buratsky, Surovikinsky District, Volgograd Oblast =

Buratsky Бурацкий
- Khutor
- Location within Volgograd Oblast Location within Russia
- Coordinates: 48°31′N 43°08′E
- Country: Russia
- Region: Volgograd Oblast
- District: Surovikinsky District
- Time zone: UTC+4:00

Buratsky (Russian: Бурацкий) is a rural locality (a khutor) in Lysovskoye Rural Settlement, Surovikinsky District, Volgograd Oblast, Russia. The population was 556 as of 2010. There are 10 streets.

== Geography ==
Buratsky is on the right bank of the Liska River, 47 km southeast of Surovikino (the district's administrative centre) by road. Novomaximovsky is the nearest rural locality.
