= Posyolok otdeleniya 3 sovkhoza Krasnaya Zvezda =

Posyolok otdeleniya 3 sovkhoza Krasnaya Zvezda Посёлок отделения № 3 совхоза «Красная Звезда»
- Settlement
- Location within Volgograd Oblast Location within Russia
- Coordinates: 48°29′N 42°44′E
- Country: Russia
- Region: Volgograd Oblast
- District: Surovikinsky District
- Time zone: UTC+4:00

Posyolok otdeleniya 3 sovkhoza Krasnaya Zvezda (Russian: Посёлок отделения № 3 совхоза «Красная Звезда») is a rural locality (a settlement) in Sysoyevskoye Rural Settlement, Surovikinsky District, Volgograd Oblast, Russia. The population was 75 as of 2010.

== Geography ==
The settlement is located 22 km southwest of Surovikino (the district's administrative centre) by road.
