= Mayorovsky, Surovikinsky District, Volgograd Oblast =

Mayorovsky Майоровский
- Khutor
- Location within Volgograd Oblast Location within Russia
- Coordinates: 48°53′N 43°10′E
- Country: Russia
- Region: Volgograd Oblast
- District: Surovikinsky District
- Time zone: UTC+4:00

Mayorovsky (Russian: Майоровский) is a rural locality (a khutor) in Kachalinskoye Rural Settlement, Surovikinsky District, Volgograd Oblast, Russia. The population was 452 as of 2010. There are 7 streets.

== Geography ==
Mayorovsky is located on the Bystry Erik River, 57 km northeast of Surovikino (the district's administrative centre) by road. Sukhanovsky is the nearest rural locality.
