= Nizhnesolonovsky =

Nizhnesolonovsky Нижнесолоновский
- Khutor
- Location within Volgograd Oblast Location within Russia
- Coordinates: 48°23′N 42°51′E
- Country: Russia
- Region: Volgograd Oblast
- District: Surovikinsky District
- Time zone: UTC+4:00

Nizhnesolonovsky (Russian: Нижнесолоновский) is a rural locality (a khutor) in Verkhnesolonovskoye Rural Settlement, Surovikinsky District, Volgograd Oblast, Russia. The population was 75 as of 2010.

== Geography ==
Nizhnesolonovsky is located 34 km south of Surovikino (the district's administrative centre) by road. Verkhnesolonovsky is the nearest rural locality.
