= Peshcherovsky =

Peshcherovsky Пещеровский
- Khutor
- Location within Volgograd Oblast Location within Russia
- Coordinates: 48°20′N 42°49′E
- Country: Russia
- Region: Volgograd Oblast
- District: Surovikinsky District
- Time zone: UTC+4:00

Peshcherovsky (Russian: Пещеровский) is a rural locality (a khutor) in Verkhnesolonovskoye Rural Settlement, Surovikinsky District, Volgograd Oblast, Russia. The population was 148 as of 2010.

== Geography ==
Peshcherovsky is located on the right bank of the Solonaya River, 36 km south of Surovikino (the district's administrative centre) by road. Verkhnesolonovsky is the nearest rural locality.
