= Verkhneosinovsky =

Verkhneosinovsky Верхнеосиновский
- Khutor
- Location within Volgograd Oblast Location within Russia
- Coordinates: 48°40′N 42°46′E
- Country: Russia
- Region: Volgograd Oblast
- District: Surovikinsky District
- Time zone: UTC+4:00

Verkhneosinovsky (Russian: Верхнеосиновский) is a rural locality (a khutor) in Nizhneosinovskoye Rural Settlement, Surovikinsky District, Volgograd Oblast, Russia. The population was 141 as of 2010.

== Geography ==
Verkhneosinovsky is located near the two Rivers, 17 km northwest of Surovikino (the district's administrative centre) by road. Starikovsky is the nearest rural locality.
