= Blizhnepodgorsky =

Blizhnepodgorsky Ближнеподгорский
- Khutor
- Location within Volgograd Oblast Location within Russia
- Coordinates: 48°25′N 43°04′E
- Country: Russia
- Region: Volgograd Oblast
- District: Surovikinsky District
- Time zone: UTC+4:00

Blizhnepodgorsky (Russian: Ближнеподгорский) is a rural locality (a khutor) in Nizhnechirskoye Rural Settlement, Surovikinsky District, Volgograd Oblast, Russia. The population was 120 as of 2010.

== Geography ==
Blizhnepodgorsky is located 37 km southeast of Surovikino (the district's administrative centre) by road. Blizhnemelnichny is the nearest rural locality.
