= Yablonevy =

Yablonevy Яблоневый
- Khutor
- Location within Volgograd Oblast Location within Russia
- Coordinates: 48°40′N 43°12′E
- Country: Russia
- Region: Volgograd Oblast
- District: Surovikinsky District
- Time zone: UTC+4:00

Yablonevy (Russian: Яблоневый) is a rural locality (a khutor) in Lysovskoye Rural Settlement, Surovikinsky District, Volgograd Oblast, Russia. The population was 78 as of 2010. There are 2 streets.

== Geography ==
Yablonevy is located 31 km northeast of Surovikino (the district's administrative centre) by road. Lysov is the nearest rural locality.
