= Chuvilevsky =

Chuvilevsky Чувилевский
- Khutor
- Location within Volgograd Oblast Location within Russia
- Coordinates: 48°35′N 42°43′E
- Country: Russia
- Region: Volgograd Oblast
- District: Surovikinsky District
- Time zone: UTC+4:00

Chuvilevsky (Russian: Чувилевский) is a rural locality (a khutor) in Nizhneosinovskoye Rural Settlement, Surovikinsky District, Volgograd Oblast, Russia. The population was 227 as of 2010.

== Geography ==
Chuvilevsky is located in the valley of the Chir River, 15 km southwest of Surovikino (the district's administrative centre) by road. Novoderbenovsky is the nearest rural locality.
