= Sysoyevsky =

Sysoyevsky Сысоевский
- Khutor
- Location within Volgograd Oblast Location within Russia
- Coordinates: 48°27′N 42°50′E
- Country: Russia
- Region: Volgograd Oblast
- District: Surovikinsky District
- Time zone: UTC+4:00

Sysoyevsky (Russian: Сысоевский) is a rural locality (a khutor) and the administrative center of Sysoyevskoye Rural Settlement, Surovikinsky District, Volgograd Oblast, Russia. The population was 588 as of 2010. There are 10 streets.

== Geography ==
Sysoyevsky is located 25 km south of Surovikino (the district's administrative centre) by road. Posyolok otdeleniya 2 sovkhoza Krasnaya Zvezda is the nearest rural locality.
