= Popov 2-y =

Popov 2-y Попов 2-й
- Khutor
- Location within Volgograd Oblast Location within Russia
- Coordinates: 48°43′N 42°52′E
- Country: Russia
- Region: Volgograd Oblast
- District: Surovikinsky District
- Time zone: UTC+4:00

Popov 2-y (Russian: Попов 2-й) is a rural locality (a khutor) in Lobakinskoye Rural Settlement, Surovikinsky District, Volgograd Oblast, Russia. The population was 174 as of 2010. There are six streets.

== Geography ==
Popov 2-y is located 19 km northeast of Surovikino (the district's administrative centre) by road. Lobakin is the nearest rural locality.
