= Rychkovsky =

Rychkovsky Рычковский
- Khutor
- Location within Volgograd Oblast Location within Russia
- Coordinates: 48°28′N 43°15′E
- Country: Russia
- Region: Volgograd Oblast
- District: Surovikinsky District
- Time zone: UTC+4:00

Rychkovsky (Russian: Рычковский) is a rural locality (a khutor) in Novomaximovskoye Rural Settlement, Surovikinsky District, Volgograd Oblast, Russia. The population was 66 as of 2010.

== Geography ==
Rychkovsky is located near the bank of the Tsimlyansk Reservoir, 59 km ESE of Surovikino (the district's administrative centre) by road. Verkhnechirsky is the nearest rural locality.
