= Suvorovsky (rural locality) =

Set index of articles associated with the same name

Suvorovsky (Russian: Суворовский; masculine), Suvorovskaya (Суворовская; feminine), or Suvorovskoye (Суворовское; neuter) is the name of several rural localities in Russia:

- Suvorovsky, Chechen Republic, a khutor in Nikolayevskaya Rural Administration of Naursky District of the Chechen Republic
- Suvorovsky, Irkutsk Oblast, a settlement in Nizhneilimsky District of Irkutsk Oblast
- Suvorovsky, Krasnoyarsk Krai, a settlement in Severo-Yeniseysky District of Krasnoyarsk Krai
- Suvorovsky, Orenburg Oblast, a settlement in Suvorovsky Selsoviet of Totsky District of Orenburg Oblast
- Suvorovsky, Saratov Oblast, a railway crossing loop in Krasnoarmeysky District of Saratov Oblast
- Suvorovskoye, a selo in Suvorovsky Rural Okrug of Ust-Labinsky District of Krasnodar Krai
- Suvorovskaya, Stavropol Krai, a stanitsa in Suvorovsky Selsoviet of Predgorny District of Stavropol Krai
- Suvorovskaya, Volgograd Oblast, a stanitsa in Nizhnechirsky Selsoviet of Surovikinsky District of Volgograd Oblast
- Suvorovskaya, Yaroslavl Oblast, a village in Kryukovsky Rural Okrug of Myshkinsky District of Yaroslavl Oblast
