= 258th Division =

258th Division may refer to:

- 258th Infantry Division, Wehrmacht, Germany
- 258th Rifle Division, Soviet Union

== See also ==
- List of military divisions by number
