= Suvorovsky =

Suvorovsky (masculine), Suvorovskaya (feminine), or Suvorovskoye (neuter) may refer to:

- Suvorovsky District, a district of Tula Oblast, Russia
- Suvorovsky (rural locality) (Suvorovskaya, Suvorovskoye), several rural localities in Russia
