= Suvorovskaya =

- Suvorovskaya (Moscow Metro)
- Suvorovskaya, Volgograd Oblast
- Suvorovskaya Square
  - Suvorov Square (Moscow)
