= Verkhnechirsky =

Verkhnechirsky Верхнечирский
- Khutor
- Location within Volgograd Oblast Location within Russia
- Coordinates: 48°28′N 43°11′E
- Country: Russia
- Region: Volgograd Oblast
- District: Surovikinsky District
- Time zone: UTC+4:00

Verkhnechirsky (Russian: Верхнечирский) is a rural locality (a khutor) in Novomaximovskoye Rural Settlement, Surovikinsky District, Volgograd Oblast, Russia. The population was 778 as of 2010. There are 3 streets.

== Geography ==
Verkhnechirsky is located in steppe, near the right bank of the Tsimlyansk Reservoir, 54 km southeast of Surovikino (the district's administrative centre) by road. Novomaximovsky is the nearest rural locality.
