= Suvorovskaya, Volgograd Oblast =

Suvorovskaya Суворовская
- Stanitsa
- Location within Volgograd Oblast Location within Russia
- Coordinates: 48°14′N 43°02′E
- Country: Russia
- Region: Volgograd Oblast
- District: Surovikinsky District
- Time zone: UTC+4:00

Suvorovskaya (Russian: Суворовская) is a rural locality (a stanitsa) in Nizhnechirskoye Rural Settlement, Surovikinsky District, Volgograd Oblast, Russia. The population was 451 as of 2010.

== Geography ==
Suvorovskaya is located on the west bank of the Tsimlyansk Reservoir, 60 km southeast of Surovikino (the district's administrative centre) by road. Nizhny Chir is the nearest rural locality.
