= 96th Guards Rifle Division =

- Active: 1943–1947
- Country: Soviet Union
- Branch: Red Army
- Type: Division
- Role: Infantry
- Engagements: Mius offensive Donbass Strategic Offensive (August 1943); Battle of the Dniepr; Nikopol–Krivoi Rog Offensive; Odessa Offensive; Operation Bagration; Baranovichi-Slonim offensive Lublin–Brest Offensive; Goldap-Gumbinnen Operation; Vistula-Oder Offensive; East Prussian Offensive; Heiligenbeil Pocket; Battle of Berlin; Prague Offensive
- Decorations: Order of Lenin; Order of the Red Banner; Order of Suvorov
- Battle honours: Ilovaisk

Commanders
- Notable commanders: Col. Semyon Samuilovich Levin; Maj. Gen. Sergei Nikolaevich Kuznetsov

The 96th Guards Rifle Division was reformed as an elite infantry division of the Red Army in May 1943, based on the 2nd formation of the 258th Rifle Division, and served in that role until after the end of the Great Patriotic War. It would become one of the more highly decorated rifle divisions of the Red Army.

The 96th Guards was formed in 5th Shock Army of Southern Front and remained in that Front until April 1944. It that month it was transferred with its 3rd Guards Rifle Corps to 28th Army and it would remain under these commands for the duration of the war. After battling across the Mius River in August it won a battle honor in the Donbas and then advanced across southern Ukraine through the winter and spring, reaching well to the west of the Dniepr. As part of 1st Belorussian Front it took part in the summer campaign that destroyed Army Group Center and was soon awarded the Order of the Red Banner for its role in the fighting around Babruysk and shortly after the Order of Lenin for its part in the liberation of Minsk. After this campaign it was transferred with 28th Army to 3rd Belorussian Front and in early 1945 took part in the Vistula-Oder Offensive, winning further honors in East Prussia. It was moved again with its Army to join 1st Ukrainian Front in April and played an important role in the battles south of Berlin. Following the German surrender the 96th Guards was assigned to occupation duty as part of the Central Group of Forces but was moved back to Belarus in 1946 and disbanded in early 1947.

== Formation ==
The 258th had fought in the defensive phase of the Battle of Stalingrad as part of 1st Guards and 24th Armies before being transferred to 65th Army for Operation Uranus. During the pursuit of the defeated Axis forces it was moved to 5th Shock Army and distinguished itself sufficiently to merit Guards status. As of the beginning of May the 258th was serving as a separate rifle division in 5th Shock Army in Southern Front. On May 4 the division was redesignated as the 96th Guards; it would receive its Guards banner on June 10. Once the division completed its reorganization its order of battle was as follows:

- 291st Guards Rifle Regiment (from 405th Rifle Regiment)
- 293rd Guards Rifle Regiment (from 991st Rifle Regiment)
- 295th Guards Rifle Regiment (from 999th Rifle Regiment)
- 234th Guards Artillery Regiment (from 782nd Artillery Regiment)
- 102nd Guards Antitank Battalion (later 102nd Guards Self-Propelled Artillery Battalion)
- 96th Guards Reconnaissance Company
- 111th Guards Sapper Battalion
- 92nd Guards Signal Battalion (later 24th Guards Signal Company)
- 100th Guards Medical/Sanitation Battalion
- 99th Guards Chemical Defense (Anti-gas) Company
- 101st Guards Motor Transport Company
- 97th Guards Field Bakery
- 98th Guards Divisional Veterinary Hospital
- 1601st Field Postal Station
- 1687th Field Office of the State Bank

The division remained under the command of Col. Semyon Samuilovich Levin, who had commanded the 258th since January 12. At the time of its redesignation it was noted that the division's personnel were roughly 50 percent Russian nationality and 50 percent Turkmens. At the beginning of July it remained a separate division in the Army.

== Into Ukraine ==
In February the 4th Panzer Army and Army Detachment Hollidt (later renamed 6th Army) had fallen back to the Mius-Front, which had been constructed the year previous. Southern Front launched its first effort to break this line on July 17 as the Battle of Kursk was winding down, but after a great deal of costly back-and-forth fighting finally suspended the effort on July 27, although German counterattacks would continue until August 2.

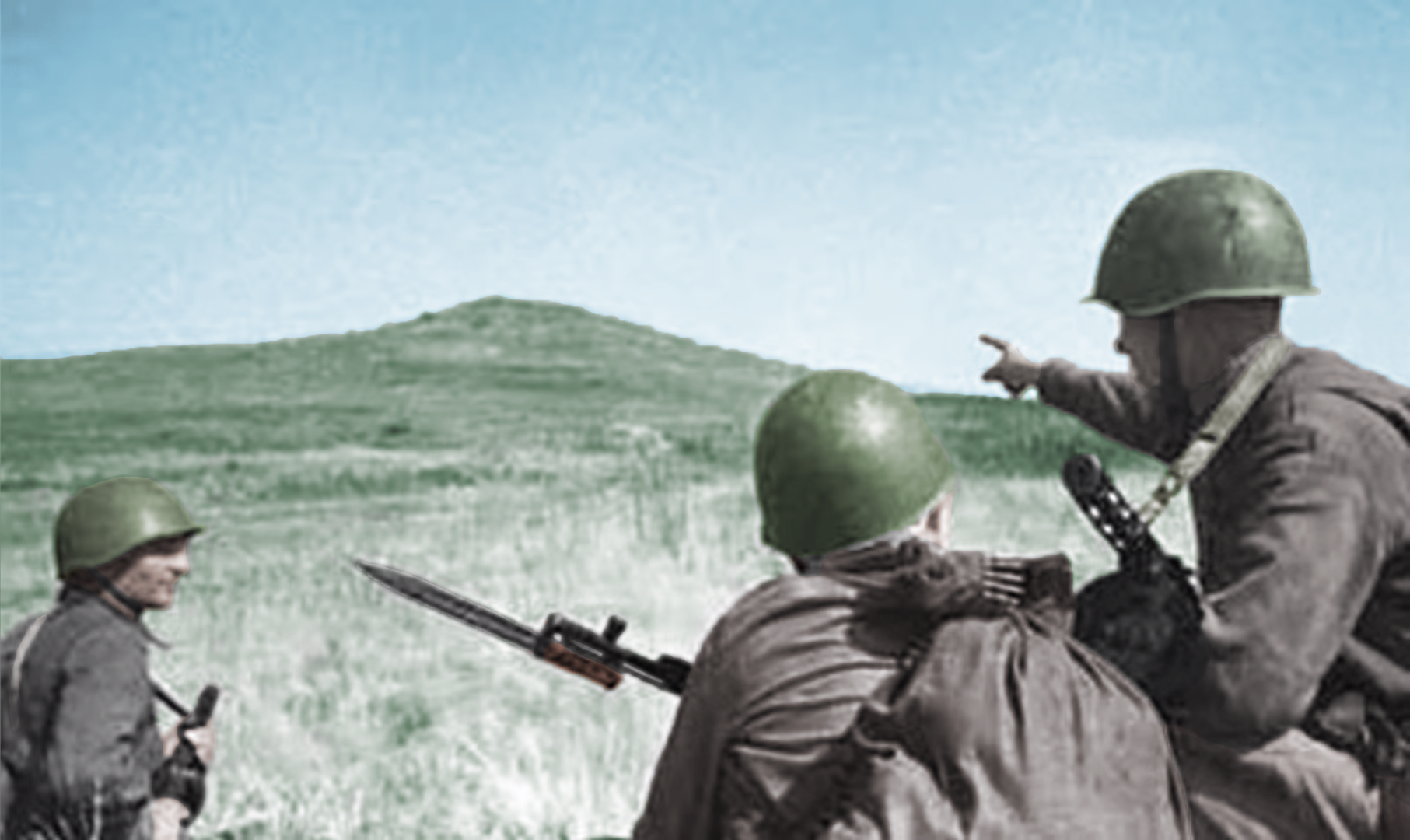
Soviet soldiers near the base of Savur-Mohyla

A renewed offensive began on August 13 and although Southwestern Front to the north was initially unable to penetrate the front of 1st Panzer Army south of Izium, Southern Front broke through 6th Army beginning on August 18. 5th Shock Army, with an overwhelming concentration, especially of artillery, on a narrow front, penetrated 7 km behind the front through a 3 km-wide gap. Under the light of a full moon the Army spread out north and south behind the 6th Army's front. The 96th Guards distinguished itself in the fighting for Savur-Mohyla. This hill was a lynchpin of the Mius-Front at a height of 277.9m. The 295th Guards Rifle Regiment, commanded by Lt. Col. Andrei Maksimovich Voloshin, led his soldiers along the west edge of the hill and captured Hill 183.0 which unhinged the German defense.

German efforts to close the gap on August 20 made some initial progress but failed due to a strong Soviet reaction. By August 23 1st Panzer Army was also in trouble with its army corps south of Izium reduced to a combat strength of just 5,800 men and unable to hold a continuous line. On the 31st Field Marshal E. von Manstein was finally authorized to withdraw both armies to the Kalmius River, effectively beginning the race to the Dniepr.

As of the start of September the 96th Guards had been assigned to the 31st Guards Rifle Corps, still in 5th Shock Army. As the advance into the Donbas continued the division liberated an important city on September 4 and the men and women of the division were soon awarded a unique honorific:

ILOVAISK... 96th Guards Rifle Division (Col. Levin, Semyon Samuilovich)... The troops who participated in the liberation of the Donbas, during which they captured Ilovaisk and other cities, by the order of the Supreme High Command of 8 September 1943, and a commendation in Moscow, are given a salute of 20 artillery salvoes from 224 guns.

By this date the division had been transferred to the 3rd Guards Rifle Corps, where it would remain for the rest of the war. At about this time it was recorded that close to 50 percent of the division's personnel were of the 1925 year group, making this a very young cadre for any rifle division.

=== Lower Dniepr Offensive ===
During the rest of September Southern Front, with 5th Shock on its right (north) flank, forced the German 6th Army back through the Donbas towards the southernmost part of the Panther–Wotan line from Zaporozhe to Melitopol. On October 9 the Front (renamed 4th Ukrainian on October 20) renewed its offensive on both sides of the latter city. The 51st Army's battle for Melitopol lasted until October 23 after which 6th Army was in a near rout across the Nogay Steppe. The larger part of its forces fell back to form a bridgehead east of the Dniepr south of Nikopol with the 5th Shock and 2nd Guards Armies in pursuit. During November substantial German reserves were moved into the bridgehead in anticipation of an offensive to restore communications with Crimea, which had been cut off by the remainder of 4th Ukrainian Front. This came to nothing in the face of Soviet threats elsewhere, but the bridgehead remained strongly held.

=== Nikopol-Krivoi Rog Offensive ===
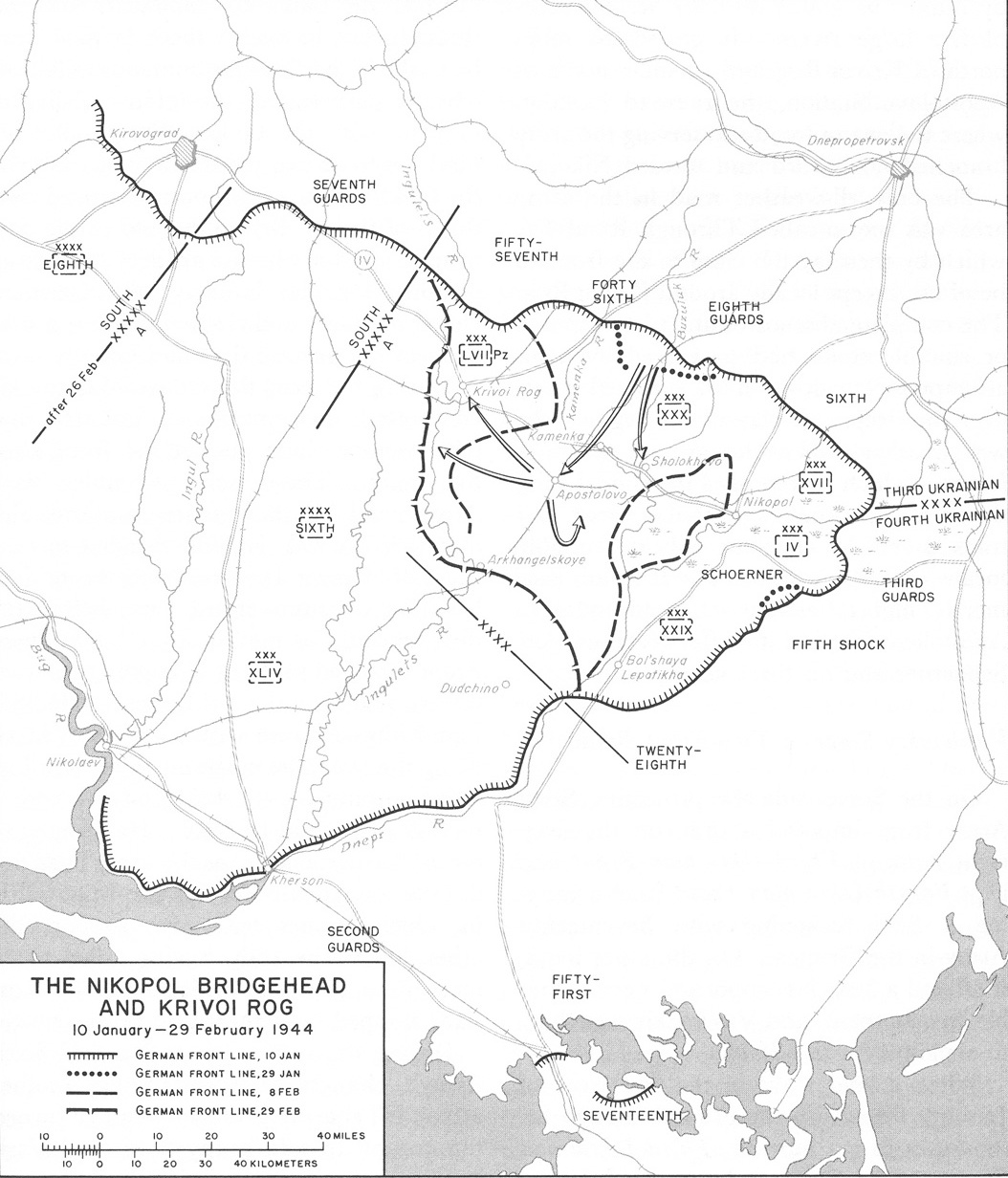
Nikopol-Krivoi Rog Offensive. Nikolayev is on the lower left.

A cold wave in the first week of January 1944 firmed up the ground enough for the 4th and 3rd Ukrainian Fronts to begin moving against the remaining German positions in the Dniepr bend. 3rd Ukrainian began its assault on January 10, but this had largely failed by the 13th. On the same day the 4th Ukrainian attacked the bridgehead but made minimal gains before both Fronts called a halt on January 16. The offensive was renewed on January 30 against a bridgehead weakened by transfers and 4th Ukrainian drove a deep wedge into its south end. On February 4 the German 6th Army ordered the bridgehead to be evacuated. During February, 5th Shock Army was transferred to 3rd Ukrainian Front.

On February 17 Colonel Levin left the division to further his military education; he would go on to command the 62nd and 99th Rifle Divisions and became a Hero of the Soviet Union. He was replaced the next day by Maj. Gen. Sergei Nikolaevich Kuznetsov, who would remain in command into the postwar. The battle for Krivoi Rog continued until the end of that month. On March 4 all four of the Ukrainian fronts began a new offensive into western Ukraine. By March 20 the 3rd Ukrainian had reached the Southern Bug River and 5th Shock Army was on the approaches to Nikolayev, which Hitler had designated as a "fortress" on March 8. Nikolayev was finally liberated on March 28; immediately following this victory the 3rd Guards Corps was moved to the Reserve of the Supreme High Command and assigned to the 28th Army. While in the Reserve the 102nd Guards Antitank Battalion gave up its 45mm antitank guns and was reequipped with 12 SU-76 self-propelled guns.

== Operation Bagration ==
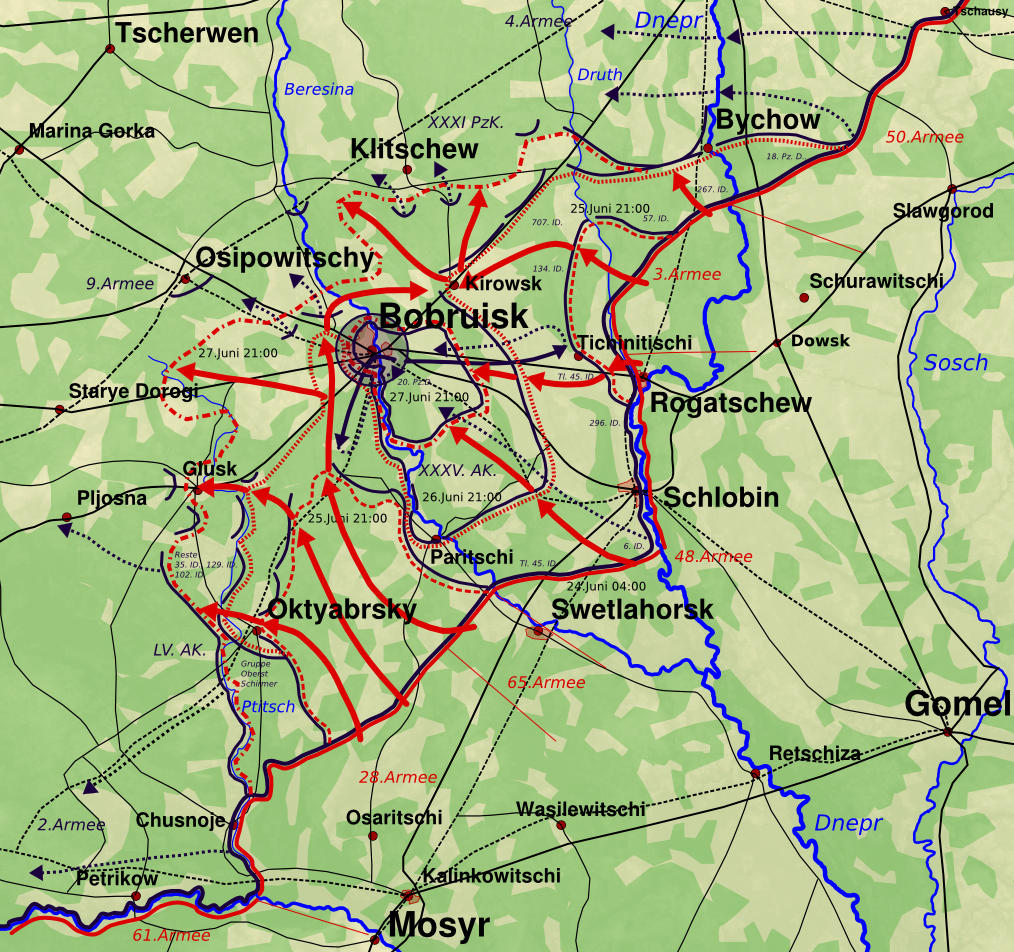
Bobryusk Offensive. Note initial position of 28th Army north of Mozyr.

At the beginning of June the 3rd Guards Corps consisted of the 96th, 50th and 54th Guards Rifle Divisions. When the Army returned to the front it joined the center of 1st Belorussian Front, at the corner northwest of Mozyr, linking with the left-flank armies which stretched along the southern margins of the Pripyat Marshes. While those armies would mostly remain inactive in the first weeks the Front commander, Army Gen. K. K. Rokossovskii, assigned the 28th an active role in the initial phase of the summer offensive in support of 65th Army's drive on Babruysk. The Army deployed all three of its corps in the first echelon with 3rd Guards Corps on a 5 km-wide sector on the right. During the first two days of the battle the Corps drove back the southern flank of the German 35th Infantry Division and together with elements of 65th Army advanced up to 10 km on June 24, forcing the German division back towards the railroad south of Babruysk. On July 2 the 96th Guards would be decorated with the Order of the Red Banner for its part in the battle for Babryusk.

On June 25 the 28th Army broke into the lines of the 35th and 129th Infantry Divisions in five places. The 129th Infantry, by now reduced to the size of a regiment, was forced to rotate to the west, leaving a gap on its corps' north flank. Meanwhile, the 18th Rifle Corps of 65th Army was scattering the remnants of 35th Infantry and widening the gap, which was entered by Cavalry Mechanized Group Pliev. By the evening of June 28 Pliev's 30th Cavalry Division reached the outskirts of Slutsk, as the rifle divisions of 28th Army were making their best speed to keep up with the advance of the mobile group. By June 30 German reinforcements were arriving, including elements of the 4th Panzer Division at Baranavichy which were sent to block the road to Slutsk. From June 22 to July 3 the 28th Army and the Pliev Group had forced a German retreat of 250 km to the vicinity of Stowbtsy, but the advance now paused to bring up supplies to overcome the increasing resistance. On July 23 the 96th Guards as a whole would receive the Order of Lenin while, unusually, its 295th Guards Rifle Regiment would be given the Order of the Red Banner in the same decree, both for their parts in the liberation of the Minsk region.

During the first week of the offensive Lt. Colonel Voloshin had continued to lead his 295th Guards Regiment with distinction, often in advance of the division. On the first day it took the village of Yeletsy, helping to open one of the gaps in the German lines. Overnight on June 26/27 an outflanking maneuver ended in the capture of three batteries of heavy artillery. The next day the Regiment forced the Ptsich River and seized the village of Glusk. Up to July 2 the 295th accounted for about 1,500 German officers and soldiers killed or severely wounded; six tanks or self-propelled guns, 30 guns and mortars, 80 machine guns and more than 100 German prisoners captured; plus 25 supply depots and 85 settlements taken. On March 24, 1945, Voloshin would be made a Hero of the Soviet Union.

=== Baranovichi-Slonim Operation ===
Resistance along the Baranavichy axis grew on July 4 as reinforcements continued to arrive, including the remainder of 4th Panzer, units of 12th Panzer Division that had broken through from Minsk, and the 1st Hungarian Cavalry Division moving up from Pinsk. 28th Army reached a line from Minkeviche to Kletsk to Rybaki. At this time Baranavichy was garrisoned by the 52nd Special Designation Security Division, a panzer battalion and three assault gun brigades. A defensive line was already being prepared along the Shchara River based on the town of Slonim. The Front was ordered, under STAVKA operational directive no. 220127, to immediately resume its advance on Baranavichy and subsequently to Brest with the 48th, 65th and 28th Armies; however the 28th was stretched out over a 25 km line of march and was still 12 km from its designated attack sector.

The Army commander, Lt. Gen. A. A. Luchinskii, directed his forces to outflank Baranavichy from the south on July 5, and by evening had liberated Lyakhavichy. Intensive fighting for Baranavichy took place on July 6–7. The line along the Shchara was penetrated but the Army advanced only a few kilometres. By the end of the second day the town was partially encircled but the Soviet advance was slowed by German reinforcements and continuing difficulties in bringing the Front's forces up to the attack sectors. Overnight the 65th Army, assisted by the 28th, stormed Baranavichy in an unexpected night attack which cleared it by 0400 hours on July 8 as the German forces withdrew to the west. By the end of the day the Army had advanced as far as Hantsavichy. On July 25 the 293rd Guards Rifle Regiment would be awarded the Order of the Red Banner for its part in the liberation of Slonim.

=== Lublin–Brest Offensive ===
The 28th Army continued making its main offensive in the direction of Kosava and Smolyanitsa and by July 13 had reached the Yaselda River along its entire front. At this point it encountered much stiffer resistance from the newly arrived 102nd Infantry Division and the 5th Hungarian Reserve Division. It fell to the 1st Mechanized Corps to pierce this line and allow the advance to continue. By July 16 the 3rd Guards Corps, in conjunction with the 105th Rifle Corps of 65th Army, had reached a line from Abramy to Chakhets, along with the Pliev Group.

The operation to liberate Brest began on July 17. The Front's main attack would be made by its left-flank armies with the right-flank forces in support; 28th Army on the right with 61st Army and the Pliev Group were to outflank the city from the north and northwest, encircle and capture it. The attack began with a 15-20 minute artillery preparation. 28th Army, with the Pliev Group, directed their advances towards Kamenets, and by the end of the day had covered 25 km. After beating off numerous German counterattacks the next day the Army forced the Lesnaya River east of Dmitrovichi and linked up with 61st Army. From July 19 the German High Command began heavy counterattacks against the Army and the Pliev Group in order to continue its hold on Brest, and these would continue until the 21st. The commitment of 20th Rifle Corps from second echelon in the direction of the railroad to Brest along the Army's left flank during the second half of July 20 allowed the offensive to gain momentum and the German forces began to withdraw towards the city. During July 25–26 the Army forced the Lesnaya north of Czernawczyci and General Rokossovskii handed over his reserve 46th Rifle Corps to help complete the encirclement. This was done on July 27 and beginning after midnight on the 28th the Army drove into the fortified zone from the north, throwing off counterattacks, and linked up with 9th Guards Rifle Corps of 61st Army and the main forces of 70th Army. The city was cleared later that day.

== Into Germany ==
Following the massive push of the summer offensive the Soviet armies remained largely inactive over the following months. In September the 28th Army returned to the Reserve of the Supreme High Command for rest and rebuilding and in October was reassigned to the 3rd Belorussian Front on the East Prussian border. It was almost immediately involved in the abortive Goldap-Gumbinnen Operation, which largely ended on its sector by October 30. By early January 1945 the 96th Guards had 6,500 personnel on strength which was quite high for a rifle division at that stage of the war, especially one that had been used as an assault formation for most of the previous 12 months.

=== East Prussian Offensives ===
In the planning for the Vistula-Oder Offensive the Front organized its shock group into two echelons with the 39th, 5th and 28th Armies in the first, backed by the 11th Guards Army and two tank corps. The 28th Army had its main forces on its right flank and was to launch a vigorous attack north of the Stallupönen–Gumbinnen paved highway in the general direction of Insterburg. Its breakthrough frontage was 7 km wide and its immediate objective was to destroy the Gumbinnen group of German forces in conjunction with 5th Army before assisting 11th Guards in its deployment along the Inster River. The Army deployed a total of 1,527 guns and mortars on this frontage and the 3rd Guards Corps, which was to launch the main attack, was backed by 205 such weapons per kilometre.

3rd Belorussian Front began its part of the offensive on the morning of January 13. The Army, mainly facing the 549th Volksgrenadier Division, broke through the defense along the Kischen–Grunhaus sector and penetrated as much as 7 km by the day's end while fighting off 14 counterattacks by infantry and tanks. On the next day 3rd Guards Corps advanced only 1-1.5 km during a day-long fight for the strongpoint of Kattenau; a number of positions changed hands several times. January 16 saw further small progress as the German forces continued to cover the routes to Gumbinnen. By now it was apparent to the Front commander, Army Gen. I. D. Chernyakhovskii, that the breakthrough would not come on this sector and he moved his second echelon to the 39th Army's front. On January 19 the Army began to advance more successfully. General Luchinskii concentrated the maximum amount of artillery fire in support of the 3rd Guards and 128th Rifle Corps allowing a breakthrough on a narrow sector towards the northeastern outskirts of Gumbinnen. Meanwhile, the 20th Rifle Corps reached the town from the south, but the German grouping continued to resist and the Army's units were forced to consolidate. During a two-day battle on January 20–21 the 20th and 128th Corps finally captured Gumbinnen, but a large remnant of the German forces managed to retreat to the Angerapp River, which the 28th Army reached by the end of the second day. By 2300 hours on January 23 it became apparent that the German forces facing the Army were in retreat to the west. Over the next two days the Army advanced up to 35 km and reached a line from Kortmedin to Gerdauen by the end of the 26th, less than 70 km southeast of Königsberg.

On February 19 several of the division's subunits were honored for their roles in breaking through the East Prussian defenses. The 295th Guards Rifle Regiment was granted the honorific "Gumbinnen"; the 291st Guards Rifle Regiment was awarded the Order of the Red Banner; the 293rd Guards Rifle Regiment and the 234th Guards Artillery Regiment each received the Order of Suvorov, 3rd Degree; and the 111th Guards Sapper Battalion won the Order of Bogdan Khmelnitsky, 3rd Degree.

After six weeks of almost continuous fighting, by the beginning of March the divisions of 3rd Belorussian Front were significantly understrength. Despite this the Front ordered a new operation to eliminate the remaining German forces southwest of the Königsberg fortified zone. The new offensive began on March 13, with 28th Army attacking in the direction of Bladiau, which was taken on March 15. During the night of March 25/26 the Army, in cooperation with 31st Army, stormed the town of Rosenberg and advanced towards Balga, capturing 6,200 soldiers, 25 tanks and 220 guns of various calibres. Immediately after the operation ended on March 29 the 28th was reassigned to the Reserve of the Supreme High command and began moving across eastern Germany towards the Oder River. On April 26 the division would be decorated with the Order of Suvorov, 2nd Degree, in recognition of its role in the fighting southwest of Königsberg.

=== Berlin Operation ===
By mid-April the 96th Guards had arrived in the 1st Ukrainian Front. The battle for the Oder and Neisse Rivers began on April 16 but 28th Army's leading divisions did not arrive at the front and begin combat operations until April 22. On April 26 the division was moving to the area of Zossen, which contained the underground headquarters of the German OKW and OKH, and passed through Golßen with its lead column. By this point the German 9th Army had been encircled and was making every effort to break out. Led by 50 tanks the advance force of this grouping attacked west along the boundary between the 120th Rifle Corps' 329th Rifle Division and the 58th Rifle Division of 3rd Guards Army in the Halbe area. While the 395th Rifle Division halted the breakthrough the 50th and 96th Guards were diverted to eliminate the German forces. The two Guards divisions threw the breakthrough force back to the woods northeast of Baruth while a further attack by the 25th Tank Corps in conjunction with the 389th Rifle Division cut it off from the main body of 9th Army.

The next day General Luchinskii received orders to occupy a line from Dornswalde to Radeland to Jauchzen-Bruck with three divisions, including the 96th Guards. While the German 9th Army continued its efforts to escape from its pocket, its former breakthrough force was gradually eliminated, sometimes in hand-to-hand fighting. 6,200 prisoners were taken, along with 47 tanks, 25 armored transports, 180 guns and mortars and 1,133 motor vehicles. By the end of the day the 9th Army pocket had shrunk to just 400 sq/km. Overnight on April 28/29 this Army organized one more effort to escape towards the positions of the 12th Army in the Luckenwalde area. The breakout began at 0100 hours and made progress at the junction of the 3rd and 3rd Guards Armies. In the morning the 3rd Guards Corps was brought up to halt the breakthrough. A combined force of 45,000 men punched a hole 2 km wide between the 50th and 54th Guards in the Munchendorf area and began moving through in spite of powerful artillery and mortar fire. This breakthrough was eventually halted by forces of the 3rd Guards Tank, 4th Guards Tank, and 13th Armies.

During April 29 the 50th and 96th Guards Divisions repulsed several heavy German attacks and by the end of the day were continuing to fight along a line from Dornswalde to Radeland to Munchendorf with their fronts facing north. While the 50th Guards, on a line from outside Radeland to an unnamed height 3 km northeast of Munchendorf was forced to pull back its left flank under pressure and the 54th Guards was also forced to give up ground the 96th Guards held its positions. Most of the remainder of German 9th Army was in the Staatsforst Kummersdorf and took heavy losses from flanking fire of the 50th and 54th Guards as they moved through the gap they had created near Munchendorf; despite these losses the survivors of 9th Army pushed about 24 km farther west. This advance succeeded in cutting the communications of 3rd and 4th Guards Tank and 28th Armies.

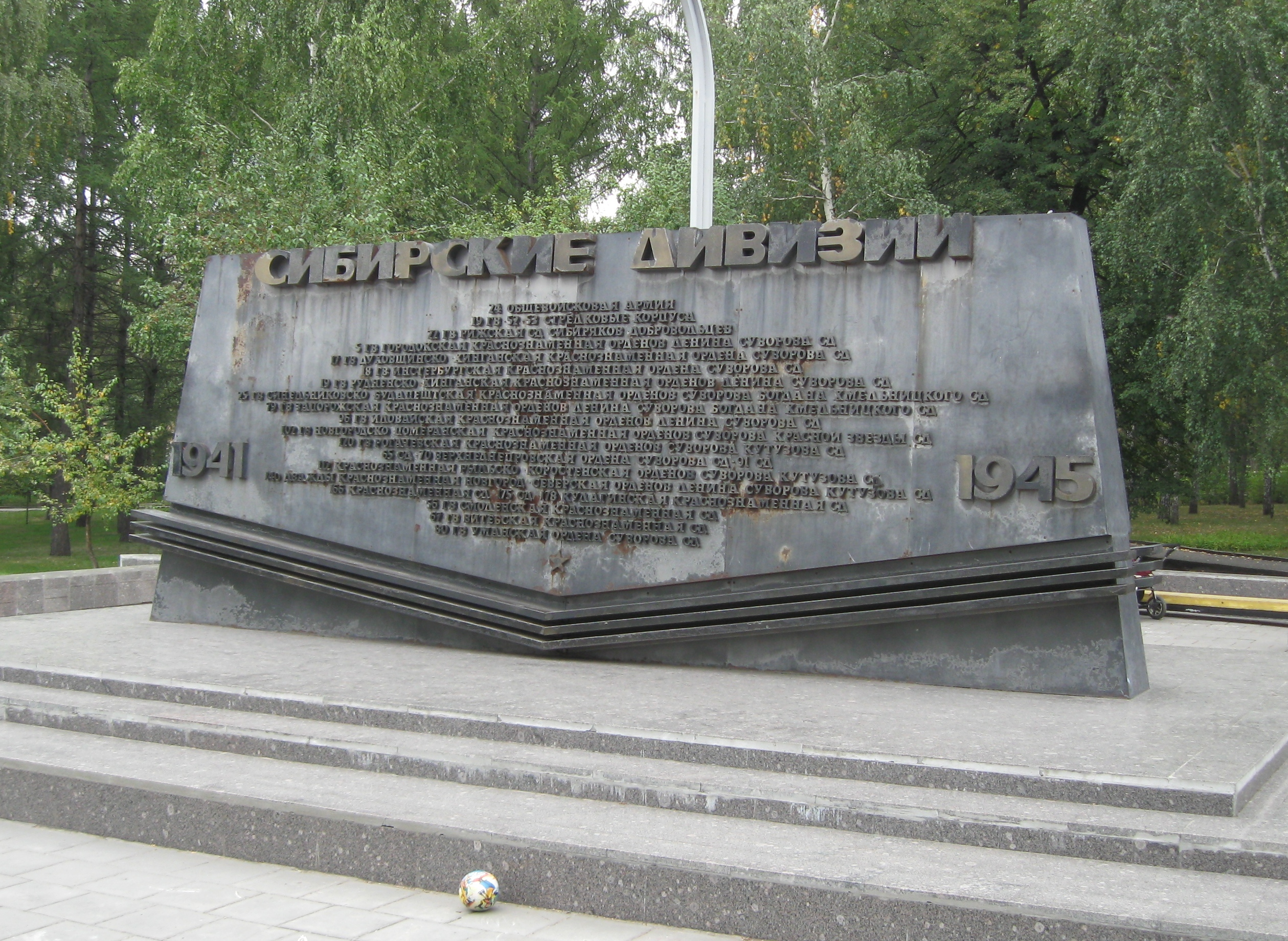
"Slavi" Monument in Novosibirsk to the 258th/96th Guards Rifle Division

Overnight the command of 1st Ukrainian Front took steps to finally eliminate this group of German forces, which were already broken into at least three pockets. Luchinskii ordered two regiments of 61st Rifle Division to be moved by trucks to the Sperenberg area to reinforce the 71st Mechanised Brigade. At the same time, 3rd Guards Corps was ordered to make concentric attacks from the north and south to defeat the German forces in the breakthrough area while 3rd Guards Army attacked from the east. Despite enormous losses the 9th Army continued its attempts to break out on April 30. 96th Guards remained in heavy fighting near Munchendorf while 71st Mechanised and elements of 117th Guards Rifle Division were forced aside; later in the day the 117th Guards brought that portion of the breakout force to a halt. By the end of the day the 3rd Guards Corps was still encountering stubborn resistance while mopping up the encircled forces in their sector. By the end of the day, although elements of 9th Army advanced another 10 km to the west, the tail of the Army was mostly eliminated and mass surrenders began; 1st Ukrainian Front alone took 24,000 prisoners. On May 1 units of the 28th Army eliminated the last remnants in the Staatsforst Kummersdorf woods as part of the German grouping. The Front command now gave orders to prepare for a new offensive in the direction of Prague.

== Postwar ==
During the first week of May the division advanced with the rest of its Front towards Prague, but saw little combat before the fighting ended on May 11. By this time the men and women of the division shared the complete title of 96th Guards Rifle, Ilovaisk, Order of Lenin, Order of the Red Banner, Order of Suvorov Division. [Russian: 96-я гвардейская стрелковая Иловайская ордена Ленина Краснознамённая ордена Суворова дивизия.] According to STAVKA Directive No. 11096, part 2, dated May 29 the division was assigned to the Central Group of Forces, effective June 10. This Group was to be responsible for the occupation of Czechoslovakia, Austria and Hungary. General Kuznetsov remained in command until the 96th Guards was disbanded; after several relatively minor appointments he would be made commander of the 17th Rifle Corps in 1955 before he was transferred to the reserve in January 1959. The division was moved to the Belorussian Military District in late 1946 and was disbanded with most of the rest of 3rd Guards Rifle Corps in March 1947.
