= Church of the Virgin Hodegetria (Agrafenovka) =

- Церковь иконы Божией Матери "Одигитрия»
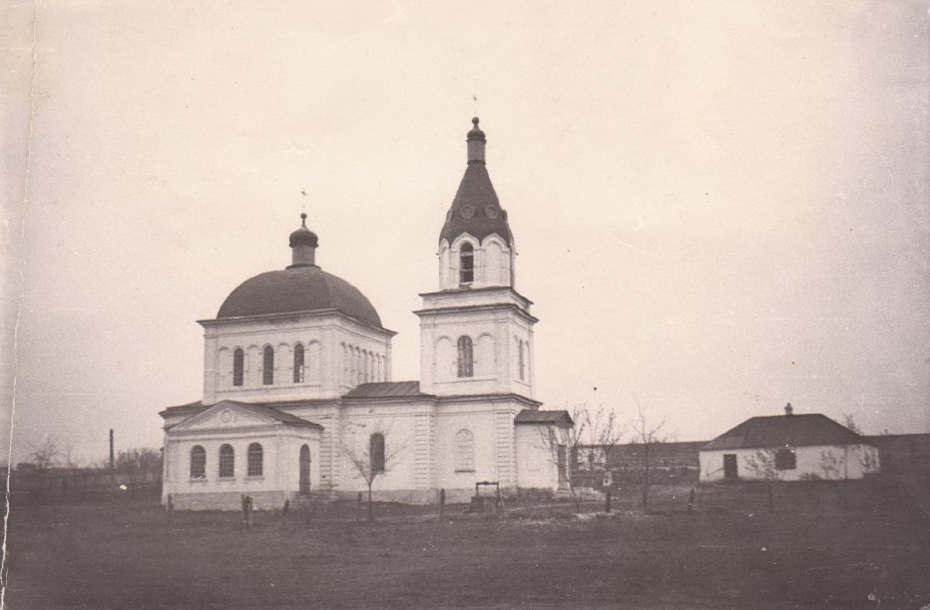
- Church of the Virgin Hodegetria in the beginning of the 20th century
- Church of the Virgin Hodegetria
- 47.44342°N 39.2924°E
- Location: Agrafenovka village, Rodionovo-Nesvetaysky District, Rostov Oblast
- Country: Russia
- Denomination: Eastern Orthodox

History
- Status: Parish church
- Dedication: Hodegetria Icon of the Mother of God

Architecture
- Functional status: Active
- Completed: 1846

Administration
- Division: Patriarchate of Moscow and All Russia
- Diocese: Shakhty and Millerovo Diocese
- Deanery: Rodionovo-Nesvetayskoe deanery

The Church of the Virgin Hodegetria (Russian: Церковь иконы Божией Матери "Одигитрия" or Свято-Одигитриевская церковь) is a Russian Orthodox church in Agrafenovka village, Rodionovo-Nesvetaysky District, Rostov Oblast, Russia. It was built in 1846 and belongs to Rodionovo-Nesvetayskoe deanery of Shakhty and Millerovo Diocese.

== History ==
The church in Agrafenovka village in the Don Host Oblastfounded on April 16, 1844. It was built of stone and had one single altar. The church was consecrated by Archbishop Ignatius of Voronezh and Zadonsk Diocese on November 3, 1846. In 1890, a parish school was organized there.

During the Soviet era the church premises were used as a granary. The last abbot of the Odigitrievsky parish, priest Nikolai Nikolaevich Zykov, was convicted and shot by the Bolsheviks. He was rehabilitated posthumously at the grounds of lack of corpus delicti.

Since 2012, the liturgies are being regularly held in the Church of the Virgin Hodegetria again.

In 2013, during earthworks, an old bell tongue was excavated. It is believed that it belonged to one of the bells of the pre-revolutionary church.
