= Opakhan =

Opakhan Опахань
- Selo
- Location within Bryansk Oblast Location within Russia
- Coordinates: 53°16′N 34°01′E
- Country: Russia
- Region: Bryansk Oblast
- District: Bryansky District
- Time zone: UTC+3:00

Opakhan (Russian: Опахань) is a rural locality (a selo) in Bryansky District, Bryansk Oblast, Russia. The population was 73 as of 2013. There are 3 streets.

== Geography ==
Opakhan is located 5 km southwest of Glinishchevo (the district's administrative centre) by road. Sevryukovo is the nearest rural locality.
