= Ovstug =

Ovstug Овстуг
- Selo
- Location within Bryansk Oblast Location within Russia
- Coordinates: 53°22′N 33°52′E
- Country: Russia
- Region: Bryansk Oblast
- District: Zhukovsky District
- Time zone: UTC+3:00

Ovstug (Russian: О́встуг) is a rural locality (a village) and the administrative center of Ovstugskoye Rural Settlement, Zhukovsky District, Bryansk Oblast, Russia. The population was 729 as of 2010. There are 8 streets.

== Geography ==
Ovstug is located 33 km southeast of Zhukovka (the district's administrative centre) by road. Dubroslavichi is the nearest rural locality.
