= Lisinsky =

Lisinsky Лисинский
- Khutor
- Location within Volgograd Oblast Location within Russia
- Coordinates: 50°02′N 42°37′E
- Country: Russia
- Region: Volgograd Oblast
- District: Kumylzhensky District
- Time zone: UTC+4:00

Lisinsky (Russian: Лисинский) is a rural locality (a khutor) in Sulyayevskoye Rural Settlement, Kumylzhensky District, Volgograd Oblast, Russia. The population was 22 as of 2010.

== Geography ==
Lisinsky is located in forest steppe, on Khopyorsko-Buzulukskaya Plain, on the bank of the Kumylga River, 23 km north of Kumylzhenskaya (the district's administrative centre) by road. Tyurinsky is the nearest rural locality.
