= Surovikino =

Town in Volgograd Oblast, Russia

Surovikino Суровикино
- Town
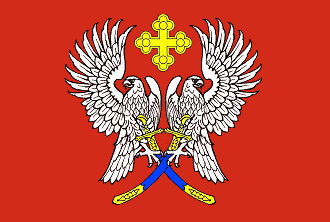
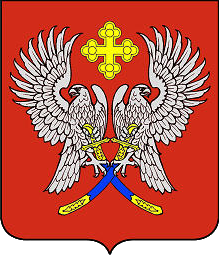
- Flag Coat of arms
- Interactive map of Surovikino
- Location of Surovikino Surovikino (Volgograd Oblast)
- Coordinates: 48°36′N 42°51′E
- Country: Russia
- Federal subject: Volgograd Oblast
- Administrative district: Surovikinsky District
- Town of district significanceSelsoviet: Surovikino
- Founded: 1900
- Town status since: 1966
- Elevation: 40 m (130 ft)

Population (2010 Census)
  - Total: 20,533
  - Estimate (2021): 18,227 (−11.2%)

Administrative status
  - Capital of: Surovikinsky District, town of district significance of Surovikino

Municipal status
  - Municipal district: Surovikinsky Municipal District
  - Urban settlement: Surovikino Urban Settlement
  - Capital of: Surovikinsky Municipal District, Surovikino Urban Settlement
- Time zone: UTC+3 (MSK)
- Postal code: 404411–404415
- OKTMO ID: 18653101001
- Website: web.archive.org/web/20131105060842/http://www.surovikino.ru/

Surovikino (Russian: Сурови́кино) is a town and the administrative center of Surovikinsky District in Volgograd Oblast, Russia, located at the confluence of the Chir and Don Rivers (Tsimlyansk Reservoir), 154 kilometers (96 mi) west of Volgograd, the administrative center of the oblast. Population: 20,533 (2010 census); 20,338 (2002 census); 18,336 (1989 Soviet census).

== History ==
It was founded as a settlement around the Surovikino railway station, which opened in 1900. It was granted town status in 1966.

On August 23, 2024, Islamic State militants detained at a penal colony in the town seized control of the prison where they were being held, killing four guards and taking others hostage before being shot by responding FSB forces.

== Administrative and municipal status ==
Within the framework of administrative divisions, Surovikino serves as the administrative center of Surovikinsky District. As an administrative division, it is incorporated within Surovikinsky District as the town of district significance of Surovikino. As a municipal division, the town of district significance of Surovikino is incorporated within Surovikinsky Municipal District as Surovikino Urban Settlement.
