= Surovikinsky District =

Surovikinsky District Суровикинский район (Russian)
- District
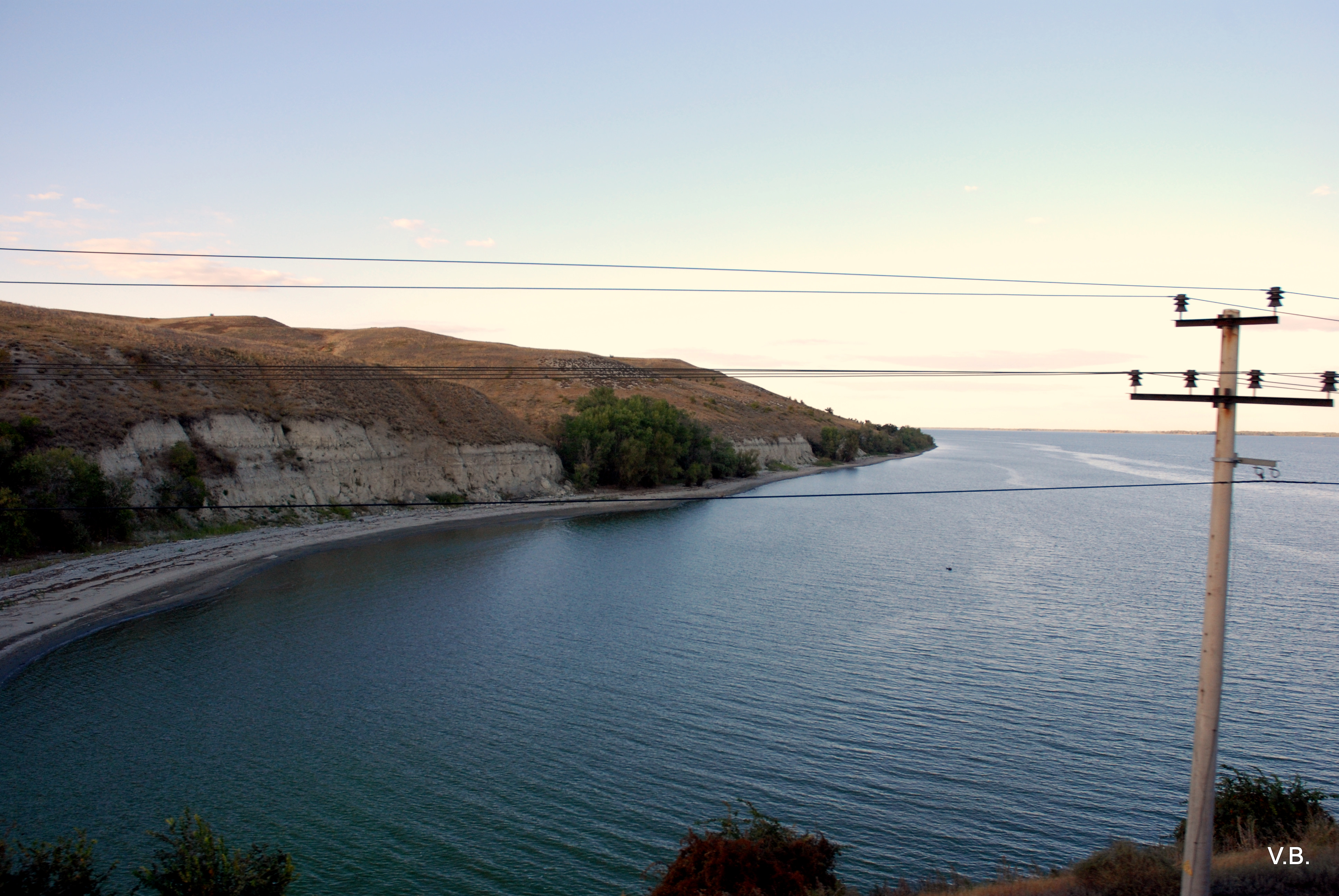
- River's edge, Surovikinsky District

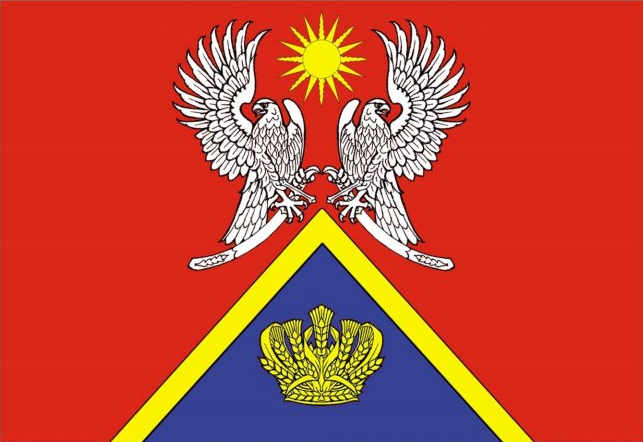
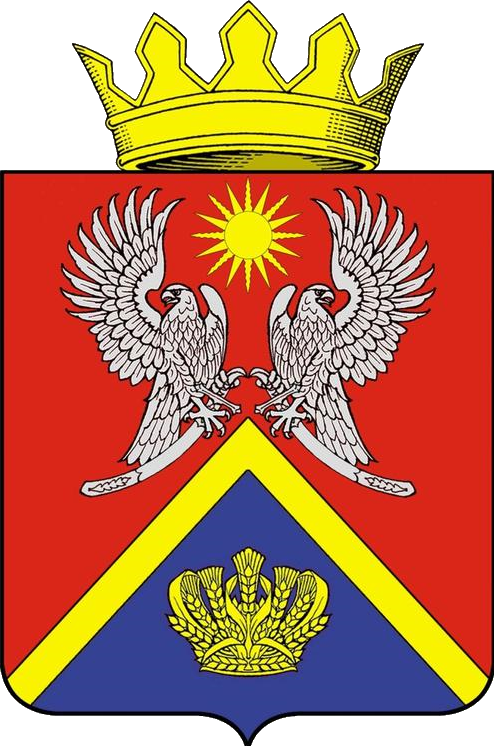
- Flag Coat of arms
- Location of Surovikinsky District in Volgograd Oblast
- Coordinates: 48°36′N 42°51′E
- Country: Russia
- Federal subject: Volgograd Oblast
- Established: 1937
- Administrative center: Surovikino

Area
  - Total: 3,870 km^{2} (1,490 sq mi)

Population (2010 Census)
  - Total: 37,104
  - Density: 9.59/km^{2} (24.8/sq mi)
  - Urban: 55.3%
  - Rural: 44.7%

Administrative structure
  - Administrative divisions: 1 Towns of district significance, 13 Selsoviets
  - Inhabited localities: 1 cities/towns, 43 rural localities

Municipal structure
  - Municipally incorporated as: Surovikinsky Municipal District
  - Municipal divisions: 1 urban settlements, 10 rural settlements
- Time zone: UTC+3 (MSK)
- OKTMO ID: 18653000
- Website: http://www.surregion.ru

Surovikinsky District (Russian: Сурови́кинский райо́н) is an administrative district (raion), one of the thirty-three in Volgograd Oblast, Russia. As a municipal division, it is incorporated as Surovikinsky Municipal District. It is located in the southwest of the oblast. The area of the district is 3,870 square kilometers (1,490 sq mi). Its administrative center is the town of Surovikino. Population: 37,104 (2010 census); 38,956 (2002 Census); 38,256 (1989 Soviet census). The population of Surovikino accounts for 55.3% of the district's total population.
