= 251st Rifle Division =

251st Rifle Division (June 26, 1941 – March 1947)
- Postwar photo of Major General A. A. Volkhin
- Active: 1941–1947
- Country: Soviet Union
- Branch: Red Army
- Type: Infantry
- Size: Division
- Engagements: Battle of Smolensk (1941); Operation Typhoon; Battle of Moscow; Battles of Rzhev; Operation Mars; Operation Büffel; Battle of Smolensk (1943); Orsha offensives (1943); Operation Bagration; Vitebsk–Orsha offensive Baltic offensive Operation Doppelkopf; Riga offensive (1944); East Prussian offensive Battle of Königsberg; Samland offensive
- Decorations: Order of the Red Banner; Order of Suvorov
- Battle honours: Vitebsk

Commanders
- Notable commanders: Maj. Gen. Filipp Yakovlevich Solovyov; Col. Vladimir Filippovich Stenin; Col. Sergei Ivanovich Orestov; Col. Basan Badminovich Gorodovikov; Maj. Gen. Aleksandr Alekseevich Volkhin; Col. Evgenii Yakovlevich Birsteyn

The 251st Rifle Division was the seventh of a group of 10 regular rifle divisions formed from cadres of NKVD border and internal troops as standard Red Army rifle divisions, very shortly after the German invasion, in the Moscow Military District. It was largely based on what would become the shtat (table of organization and equipment) of July 29, 1941, with several variations. It served under command of 30th Army in an effort to recover Smolensk in late July and in the Dukhovshchina offensives in August and September, and was quickly reduced to a much-weakened state. It was largely encircled in the initial stages of Operation Typhoon but sufficient men and equipment escaped that it was spared being disbanded. In the following two and a half years the division slogged through the difficult and costly battles around Rzhev and Smolensk as part of 20th Army, and later 31st Army, of Western Front, including several abortive offensives toward Orsha and Vitebsk in late 1943 and early 1944. At the start of Operation Bagration in June the 251st was serving in the 39th Army of 1st Baltic Front and it won a battle honor for its part in the liberation of Vitebsk. Following this victory it advanced into the "Baltic Gap" that had formed between Army Groups North and Center, entering Lithuania and winning the Order of the Red Banner for its part in the fighting for Kaunas. The division was transferred to 43rd Army and then 4th Shock Army as the Front advanced on Riga, and two of its rifle regiments received decorations for the battles for the Latvian capital. In the first days of 1945 the 251st was reassigned yet again, to the 2nd Guards Army of 3rd Belorussian Front, and served under this Army for the duration of the war. It, and several of its subunits, received awards during the East Prussian campaign, and ended the war in East Prussia. After the war the 251st was moved into the Caucasus region, and was finally disbanded in early 1947.

== Formation ==
The 251st Rifle Division began forming within days of the start of the German invasion on June 26, 1941, at Kolomna, in the Moscow Military District. This was based on an NKVD order of that date:

In accordance with a decision of the USSR's government, the NKVD of the USSR is charged with forming fifteen rifle divisions [10 regular and 5 mountain].
1. Lieutenant General I. I. Maslennikov is entrusted with the task of forming fifteen rifle divisions of NKVD forces...
3. Begin forming and deploying the [following] divisions immediately: 243rd Rifle Division, 244th Rifle Division, 246th Rifle Division, 247th Rifle Division, 249th Rifle Division, 250th Rifle Division, 251st Rifle Division, 252nd Rifle Division, 254th Rifle Division, 256th Rifle Division...
4. To form the divisions designated above, assign 1,000 soldiers and non-commissioned officers and 500 command cadre from the NKVD's cadre to each division. Request the Red Army General Staff to provide the remainder of personnel by calling up all categories of soldiers from the reserves.
5. Complete concentrating the NKVD cadre at the formation regions by 17 July 1941...

Its order of battle was as follows:

- 919th Rifle Regiment
- 923rd Rifle Regiment
- 927th Rifle Regiment
- 789th Artillery Regiment
- 309th Antitank Battalion
- 331st Reconnaissance Company
- 419th Sapper Battalion
- 671st Signal Battalion (later 671st, 429th Signal Companies)
- 269th Medical/Sanitation Battalion
- 249th Chemical Defense (Anti-gas) Company
- 61st Auto Transport Company (later 472nd)
- 308th Field Bakery
- 306th Divisional Veterinary Hospital (later 104th)
- 814th Field Postal Station
- 715th Field Office of the State Bank

Maj. Gen. Filipp Yakovlevich Solovyov, an NKVD officer, was named divisional commander on June 30; he had previously led the 26th NKVD Rifle Division. The division was assigned to 30th Army of Western Front by July 13, less than three weeks after beginning to be formed. On its arrival at the front the unit did not make a favorable impression on the Army commander, Maj. Gen. V. A. Khomenko, who reported on August 5:

... the division is without equipment... no formed [anti-]chemical company... artillery didn't arrive until early August on three trains... 400 NKVD cadre, lots of Party members and Komsomols, but so few and weak horses that the artillery regiment had to move in relays... very little combat power.

In this same report Khomenko stated in regard to his 250th and 251st Divisions that they had been required to move up to 350 km on foot to their concentration areas and "were taken from their assembly points in the very midst of assembly, and, incomplete, they did not approach being 'knocked together' and went into battle unprepared for combat." The two divisions had no howitzers at all, severe shortages existed in field guns and mortars, and ammunition of all types was short. He went on to note:

1. 30th Army received its combat mission while it was forming and assembling. Because the army was formed from poorly-trained reservists, the army's combat capabilities when it received its combat mission were not at the proper level as was confirmed by the outcome of combat operations.
2. The provisioning of the army with weapons and combat equipment was unsatisfactory...
3. Providing the army with all that was suitable and necessary by higher level supply organs occurred very slowly, partially, and was of insufficient quality.

Glantz comments that "These candid reports about the combat state of 30th Army will largely explain why 30th Army operates as it does during the Western Front's three counteroffensives during late July, August, and early September 1941. Given these facts, the army's performance was nothing short of amazing."

30th Army was first assigned to the Group of STAVKA Reserve Armies, and also contained the 242nd and 250th Rifle Divisions. On July 21 General Khomenko ordered each of his rifle divisions to receive a tank battalion from the 110th Tank Division. These battalions were supposed to consist of two companies, one of 10 T-34s and one of 10 BT or T-26 light tanks, plus a BT or T-26 as a headquarters tank, but by the date of the above report only one of these tanks remained.

=== Battle of Smolensk ===
The 251st officially joined the active army on July 18, just over three weeks after beginning to form up. Three days earlier, the lead elements of 2nd Panzer Group's 29th Motorized Division had reached the southern part of Smolensk. Over the following days German pressure mounted against the three armies of Western Front, commanded by Marshal S. K. Timoshenko, which were almost entirely encircled in that region. On July 19 the commander of the Group of STAVKA Reserve Armies, Lt. Gen. I. A. Bogdanov, was alerted by the STAVKA to begin preparing an offensive operation with his 29th, 30th and 28th Armies to rescue Timoshenko's force. The 30th, starting from its concentration area north of the Western Dvina River, was to advance toward Demidov.

The following day, on behalf of the STAVKA, Army Gen. G. K. Zhukov sent a directive to Timoshenko, who was now acting as commander of the Western Direction. Four reserve armies, including the 30th (now designated as "Group Khomenko"), were to launch attacks toward Dukhovshchina and Smolensk along converging axes. Khomenko was to attack southward from the region southwest of Bely to reach the Maksimovka–Petropole line by the end of July 22 before pushing on toward Dukhovshchina the next morning. A report from 0600 hours on July 23 indicated that the 251st had reached the Belyi line. A further report two days later stated that the Army was engaged in fighting with German motorized infantry 2 km north of Chernyi Ruchei, and that the division (less one rifle regiment) was attacking from the Petropole line, 25 km south of Bely, as of 2000 hours to assist the 107th Tank Division on its left.

In orders issued by Timoshenko at 0240 hours on July 26 the division was to attack toward Teribki and Baturino and capture the Pozhinki, Sukharevo, and Lelimovo region, 40 km south of that Bely. During that day and the next 30th Army recorded some tactical successes in advances of 5–15 km against the dug-in company-size battlegroups of 18th Motorized Division, On July 30 General Solovyov left the 251st and was replaced by Maj. Gen. Ivan Fyodorovich Nikitin. Solovyov returned to the front as commander of the 364th Rifle Division in September; he would later lead the 112th and 123rd Rifle Corps and be promoted to the rank of lieutenant general. Nikitin had commanded the 58th Rifle Division prewar and had also served as a senior instructor at the Frunze Military Academy. By July 31 it was clear that the offensive to recover Smolensk and rescue the three nearly encircled armies there had failed, but had also forced Army Group Center's two panzer groups to a near standstill.

On August 1 Army Group Center began its final effort to seal off the Smolensk pocket and liquidate the forces within it. In a report issued by Timoshenko at 2000 hours on August 3 it was stated that 30th Army had attacked with its main forces in the morning, overcoming strong German resistance, with the 251st moving on Zhidki and Pochinok No. 2 against small groups of withdrawing German troops. As of August 5 the division had lost 3,898 officers and men killed, wounded or missing; the 919th and 923rd Rifle Regiments were down to just 247 and 379 men, respectively. In addition, the tank battalion had just one operational vehicle remaining.

=== Dukhovshchina Offensives ===
As of August 8 the divisions of XXXIX Motorized Corps which had been facing 30th Army had been relieved by the infantry divisions of 9th Army's V Army Corps. These divisions were very hard pressed to parry the attacks of Khomenko's forces and Lt. Gen. I. S. Konev's 19th Army east and northeast of Dukhovshchina. In the wake of these assaults the commander of Army Group Center noted "9th Army was also attacked; the day before yesterday the Russians broke through as far as the 5th Division's artillery positions." The chief of staff of OKH, Col. Gen. F. Halder, noted on August 11 in regard to these attacks:

The whole situation makes it increasingly plain that we have underestimated the Russian colossus, who consistently prepared for war with that utterly ruthless determination so characteristic of totalitarian states... At the outset of war, we reckoned with about 200 enemy divisions. Now we have already counted 360. These divisions indeed are not armed and equipped according to our standards, and their tactical leadership is often poor. But they are there, and if we smash a dozen of them, the Russians simply put up another dozen.

Timoshenko began planning for a renewed effort on August 14 which was intended to recapture Dukhovshchina en route to Smolensk. The STAVKA ordered this to be coordinated with Zhukov's Reserve Front on August 17 in order to engulf the entire front from Toropets in the north to Bryansk in the south. In the event, due to the chaotic situation, Timoshenko was forced to conduct the operation in piecemeal fashion and was unable to establish close cooperation with Zhukov.

The operational directive set the goal of encircling and destroying the German 106th, 5th, and 28th Infantry Divisions and 900th Lehr Regiment through concentric attacks with two shock groups, the northern consisting of the 30th Army's 242nd, 251st and 162nd Rifle Divisions, 107th Tank and 45th Cavalry Divisions. The Army was to protect its right flank toward Bely with the 250th Division, penetrate the German defense and then commit the mobile forces to encircle the objective from the west. The attack sector was 17km wide from Markovo to Staroe Morokhovo, from 38km to 55km north of Yartsevo. The 251st, which had the support of two battalions of the 392nd Cannon Artillery Regiment and other supporting units, was to block the German center of resistance near Staroe Selo with two battalions, attack toward Shelepy and Pominki with its main forces, with the immediate mission of reaching the Staroe Sochnevo and Khadobuzha line, and subsequently develop the attack in the general direction of Verdino. The 107th Tanks and 45th Cavalry were to follow through the 251st's sector. The attack was to be preceded by a 45-minute artillery preparation beginning at 0900 hours. The shock group faced the German 106th Infantry, which was holding a sector roughly 16km wide.

General Khomenko launched his attack on time, despite not all of his forces having managed to reach their jumping-off points. Several units were fed in piecemeal, which in some instances worked to their advantage, since the artillery preparation had done more to alert German units than it accomplished in causing damage. While 19th Army managed to penetrate the German tactical defenses throughout its sector, 30th Army achieved far more limited results due to intense machine gun and mortar fire, backed by effective artillery fire on most sectors. The 251st, in common with the 162nd and 242nd, only advanced from 150m-400m, but the 107th Tanks, in cooperation with one regiment of the 162nd, was successful in penetrating the defensive line and exploited roughly 4 km deep. Timoshenko's headquarters reported at 2000 hours that the 251st had attacked in the Pochinoi 2 and Guliaevo sector and was fighting to capture Gordeenki from the north with its left wing.

The Army attempted to resume its offensive at 0900 on August 18, but Khomenko's evening report reveals very little progress: "251st RD – fighting for Staroe Selo and Gordeenki." Overall, although 19th Army continued to make some gains, the 30th could not say the same. In addition, German reserves, such as the 35th Infantry Division, were arriving in the sector. General Nikitin left the division that day; in September he would be given command of the 128th Rifle Division and later did three stints as deputy commander of 42nd Army and as commander of two rifle corps, but ended the war leading the 45th Rifle Training Division. He was replaced the next day by Col. Vladimir Filippovich Stenin, who had previously been deputy commander of the 69th Motorized Rifle Division, which had been reorganized as the 107th Tanks in July. On the same day, although the 162nd Rifle and 107th Tank Divisions managed to cover another 2 km, the remaining divisions stalled against heavy resistance, and the belated arrival of the reinforcing 244th Rifle Division did nothing to assist because it had not yet regrouped after its long approach march. Under the pressure of the offensive the German 9th Army had no choice but to call on the only available reserve, the 7th Panzer Division.

Army Group Center began its counterstroke on August 20. By noon the 7th Panzer was concentrated north of Losevo with roughly 110 tanks (mostly Panzer 38(t) types), preparing to strike the right flank of 19th Army. This attack drove into the heart of the Army's antitank defenses and was driven off with significant losses. Meanwhile, 30th Army maintained its offensive pressure as best it could; Khomenko reported that the 251st and 162nd Divisions were fighting fiercely to widen the penetration in the Pochinoi 2 and Shelepy sector. The next day, as the dogfight with 7th Panzer continued, Timoshenko decided that, since it appeared that 30th Army's attacks were going nowhere, it would be more useful to transfer its fresh forces to 19th Army's sector; on August 22 he permitted Khomenko to take a day to rest and refit. At the end of the day the 251st was reported as being west of Mikhailovshchina and the edge of the woods 1,000m southeast of Sechenki. Among the division's casualties the military commissar of its headquarters and Battalion Commissar Zaitsev was reported killed, as was Captain Shamko, the acting commander of the 927th Rifle Regiment. 19th Army resumed the attack on August 23 and 30th Army recorded some minor gains, with the division being tasked with identifying the boundaries between the German formations, begin penetrating these boundaries by sudden attacks overnight, and be prepared to exploit these penetrations the next morning. However, by the end of the day word had reached Timoshenko that 22nd Army, which was supposed to be advancing south of Velikiye Luki, was in fact facing defeat from the forces of 3rd Panzer Group moving northward.

Despite this impending crisis, Stalin, the STAVKA, and Timoshenko remained confident that their armies could collapse Army Group Center's defenses east of Smolensk, and so persisted in their offensive preparations. On August 25 Timoshenko directed Khomenko to continue protecting the Bely axis with at least two regiments of the 250th Division while preparing to continue the offensive with most of the rest of his forces. At 0145 hours Khomenko dispatched a warning order to his subordinates which included:

251st RD – relieve 107th TD's 120th [Motorized Rifle Regiment] with one regiment at 0600 hours on 25 August, protect the left flank of the army's shock group, and prepare to exploit 162nd RD's success on the right wing toward Sechenki, Krechets, and Boris'kova.

Near the end of the day it was reported that the 251st was fighting to capture Sechenki against strong German resistance, but had not faced any counterattacks. This was part of a combined attack by the Army's five divisions on a 7 km-wide sector against 106th Infantry Division which gained up to 2.5 km and forced the German division back to its second defensive line. The assault resumed just past noon of the following day. The division was reported as fighting to capture Bolshoe Repino with its right wing and protecting the Nazemenki and Torchilovo sector with its left wing. Altogether, 30th Army forced the right wing of the damaged 106th Infantry to bend but not break, but at the cost to itself of 182 men killed and wounded. The heaviest fighting on August 28 occurred in the Shelepy area where the 251st and 162nd Divisions recorded advances of several hundreds of metres. The former captured Bolshoe Repino and reached a line from Hill 212.9 to the road junction southwest of Sekachi by 1500 hours while continuing to attack toward Krechets and Gorodno; this was supported by most of 107th Tanks. The Army lost another 453 men killed and wounded during the day. Khomenko issued orders for August 29 for the divisions to make a combined attack on the Gorodno and to seize crossings over the Votra River. This would smash the right wing defenses of 106th Infantry. Just before midnight, Timoshenko gave further orders that, while continuing its attacks, 30th Army was to regroup during August 30–31 for a new general offensive.

==== Second offensive ====
On August 29 the division encountered heavy German fire while capturing Hill 235.1 and beginning to fight for Gorodnoe. The following day it was ordered to capture Krechets and Novoselki and protect the Army's left flank. In the process of regrouping, Khomenko formed a new shock group consisting of the 251st, 162nd and 242nd divisions, backed by the 250th and the artillery of 107th Tanks. Timoshenko, determined to carry out his design and press the advantages he had won, issued orders to Western Front to prepare to resume the offensive on September 1 after regrouping. 30th Army was directed to make its main attack toward Demidov, with the objective of reaching that place as well as Velizh by the end of September 8.

During August 30, before the offensive officially resumed, the 251st completed the recapture of Gorodno as German forces withdrew to the northwest. When the general assault began the division attacked at 0900 hours; by 1630 the 919th Regiment had occupied Hill 214.9 and was attacking toward Krechets, while the 923rd Regiment reached the brushy area 500m east of Ivanovo before attacking toward that place. During the day the Army lost 248 men killed and wounded. Khomenko now issued orders for September 2, directing Colonel Stenin to regroup his main forces to his left wing overnight, establish links with the 244th Division of 19th Army, capture the road junction at Dorofeevo and crossings over the Votro in that sector, 5–7 km west-southwest of Gorodno. As of 0500 the 251st was reported as digging in along the Hill 214.9, Novoselki and southwestern outskirts of Gorodno line. During this day and the next 30th Army recorded very few gains, and as of 1700 hours on September 3 the division was said to have advanced 400m to a road junction east of Mamonovo. Khomenko attacked again at 0800 on September 5 with four divisions, including the 251st, but was unsuccessful at the cost of an additional 131 men. Finally, at 0335 on September 10 the STAVKA ordered Western Front to go over to the defense. The next day the division, in cooperation with the 162nd, was ordered to firmly defend the Hill 228.0, Olkhovka, and Ilina Farm region (25–32 km south of Chernyi Ruchei), with combat security positions along the Shelepy, Shanino Farm, 1,000m west of Sechenki, and western outskirts of Gorodno line to prevent German infantry and tanks from penetrating toward Savinka and Karpovo and protect the boundary with 244th Division. In a report produced by the Army's military council on September 6 the division had been criticized for poor collection of intelligence, to the point of appointing a procurator to investigate if criminal proceedings would be justified.

== Operation Typhoon ==
The front west of Moscow was generally quiet through the balance of September as Army Groups Center and South focused on the encirclement and destruction of Southwestern Front east of Kyiv. By the end of the month 30th Army was defending a 66 km-wide sector with four divisions; 19th Army remained on its left (south) flank. General Khomenko correctly determined, due to the terrain, that the Kaniutino axis was likely where the main German attack would come. At the expense of a critical weakening of the Army's other sectors the 162nd Division was moved from reserve to deploy on this flank in two echelons on a frontage of only 6.5 km, with one regiment of the 242nd also in the first echelon. The 251st was designated as the Army's reserve, backed by 107th Tanks (now redesignated as 107th Motorized Rifle) in Front reserve. In addition to being badly overstretched, the Army was experiencing an acute shortage of artillery, rifles, and engineering assets. Although the STAVKA believed the main German attack would come along the Smolensk–Vyazma highway, in fact it would be aimed at the 19th/30th Army boundary.

Khomenko decided to fire a preemptive artillery bombardment between 1100 and 1130 hours on October 1 in an effort to disrupt the German forces which, by then, were clearly massing against his left flank. While Khomenko's headquarters claimed significant damage had been inflicted, a good deal of the Army's available ammunition was also expended. Operation Typhoon began at 0530 hours on October 2, and the Army boundary was struck by 3rd Panzer Group and 9th Army as Khomenko expected. While the overall attack front was up to 45 km wide the main breakthrough sector was only 16 km wide. Overall, the Kaniutino axis was attacked by four German corps consisting of 12 divisions, including three panzer divisions (460–470 tanks) and one motorized division, simultaneously. Shortly after, the 9th Army's VI Army Corps began pushing toward Bely. At 1630 hours Khomenko issued a combat order which stated in part:

2. The 251st Rifle Division – leaving up to one regiment on the Efremovo, Bogoliubovo front as cover and stubbornly defending the crossing on the Rekon' River, with its main forces in cooperation with the 162nd Rifle Division is to attack in the Lukashevo, Krapivnia direction.

The two divisions were to destroy the German units that had broken through, prevent further expansion of their lodgements, and restore the positions of the 162nd. Not only were these orders unrealistic, but the commitment of the 251st and 107th Motorized was delayed and piecemeal. Not only did the counterattack fail but the line of defense along the Vop River could not be held, and the Army's left flank divisions began to retreat to the east.

General Konev, now in command of Western Front, resolved to stage a counterstroke against the penetration using Front reserves along with the 30th Army from the north and 19th Army from the south. The reserve commander, Lt. Gen. I. V. Boldin, ordered the formation of an operational group to consist of the 251st and 152nd Rifle Divisions, 45th Cavalry Division, 101st Motorized Division and two tank brigades. This group was "to liquidate the enemy breakthrough on the Kaniutino axis and restore the 30th Army's position." The bulk of this force was located as far as 55 km from the breakthrough area. Boldin's Group was largely intercepted by advancing German forces (significantly underestimated in numbers by Western Front) long before reaching its assembly areas. Meanwhile, the chief of the Vyazma garrison had reported at 0645 that 30th Army's headquarters had no contact with either the 162nd or 251st Divisions.

The situation on the Bely axis deteriorated further after the failure of 30th Army's counterattack. The 107th Motorized and 251st had both suffered heavy losses and were thrown back to the east. At 0719 hours on October 5 General Khomenko reported to Konev that the 242nd, 107th Motorized, and 250th Divisions had been fighting in encirclement for two days. They had run out of ammunition. German forces had seized Bely the day before and under the circumstances he requested permission for the three divisions to break out and withdraw to the northeast. At 0720 on October 6, in a illustration of the chaos gripping Western Front, General Boldin was still assigning orders to the 251st, directing its remnants, along with the 152nd (minus one regiment), to take Igorevskaya Station. The German main encirclement was closed the next day near Vyazma, while the 251st, 162nd and 242nd Divisions were also pocketed separately east of Bely and north of Sychyovka. These passed to the control of 31st Army as 30th Army headquarters went into reserve. By October 9 up to 500 men of the division had been collected in the Aleksandrovka area, and were expected to arrive in the Sychyovka area by nightfall. Colonel Stenin led this breakout; while nominally in command of the division until October 25 he was replaced on this date by Col. Sergei Ivanovich Orestov. Stenin went on to several other commands, being promoted to the rank of major general on August 4, 1942, and was made a Hero of the Soviet Union on April 6, 1945.

As of October 10 the remnants of the 242nd, 162nd, and that part of the 251st which had not escaped, remained encircled by the German 6th and 110th Infantry Divisions west of the Rzhev–Vyazma road. Already, the 9th Army was so overstretched that it could not spare the manpower to mop up the pocket, which was simply surrounded by a thin cordon of detachments from various infantry divisions. After holding out for 15 days, the three divisions staged a successful breakout to the north on October 27, and reached the lines of 29th Army before the end of the month, covering some 75 km and causing damage and confusion in the German rear. While the other two divisions were disbanded for replacements, the 251st was not, although at the end of the year its strength was no more than 2,000 men. It was rebuilt over the following months.

=== Defense of Moscow ===
By the beginning of November the division had returned to 30th Army, which was now in Kalinin Front, but later in the month the Army was assigned back to Western Front. The 923rd Rifle Regiment was operating detached from its division and, by order of Western Front staff, on November 26 was concentrating, with the 2nd Motorized Rifle Regiment, in the area of Dmitrovka, 20 km southeast of Solnechnogorsk. It then became part of the Rogachevo group, which on November 28 was noted as falling back to the east and southeast under pressure of superior German forces following difficult defensive fighting.

== Battles of Rzhev ==
By the beginning of the new year the 30th Army had returned to Kalinin Front; in January the 251st formally returned to command of 31st Army in the same Front. On January 8 the first Rzhev-Vyazma offensive began with a total of 14 armies of Kalinin and Western Fronts involved. Kalinin Front led the attack with 29th and 39th Armies forming its shock group. 29th Army soon began to envelop Rzhev from the west, reaching as close as 8 km to the city by January 11, and the STAVKA ordered the Front commander, General Konev, that it be taken the following day. On its left, 31st Army secured the advance and prevented German 9th Army from shifting units to Rzhev. The German forces managed to hold the city.

On February 16 the STAVKA issued a new directive which reiterated the task for the troops of the Western Direction "to smash and destroy the enemy's Rzhev–Viaz'ma–Iukhnov grouping and by 5 March reach and dig in on our old defensive line with prepared anti-tank ditches." This directive raises doubts that the STAVKA knew the real situation. 31st Army was given the order to seize the Zubtsov area by the end of February 23. Only this Army was able to get underway on the designated start date of February 20; the others started on various days thereafter. Daily grinding attacks began, none of which brought any real results. Nevertheless, on March 20 the STAVKA again demanded that Kalinin and Western Fronts continue to execute the previously assigned orders more energetically, declaring that "the liquidation of the enemy's Rzhev–Gzhatsk–Viaz'ma grouping has been impermissibly delayed." 31st Army, with the newly refitted 29th Army, was to seize Rzhev by April 5. This effort had no more success than the previous, in part due to the start of the spring rasputitsa. By this time the Army had been reduced to just three divisions (5th, 247th, 251st). In July the 251st was transferred to 20th Army in Western Front.

=== First Rzhev-Sychyovka Offensive ===
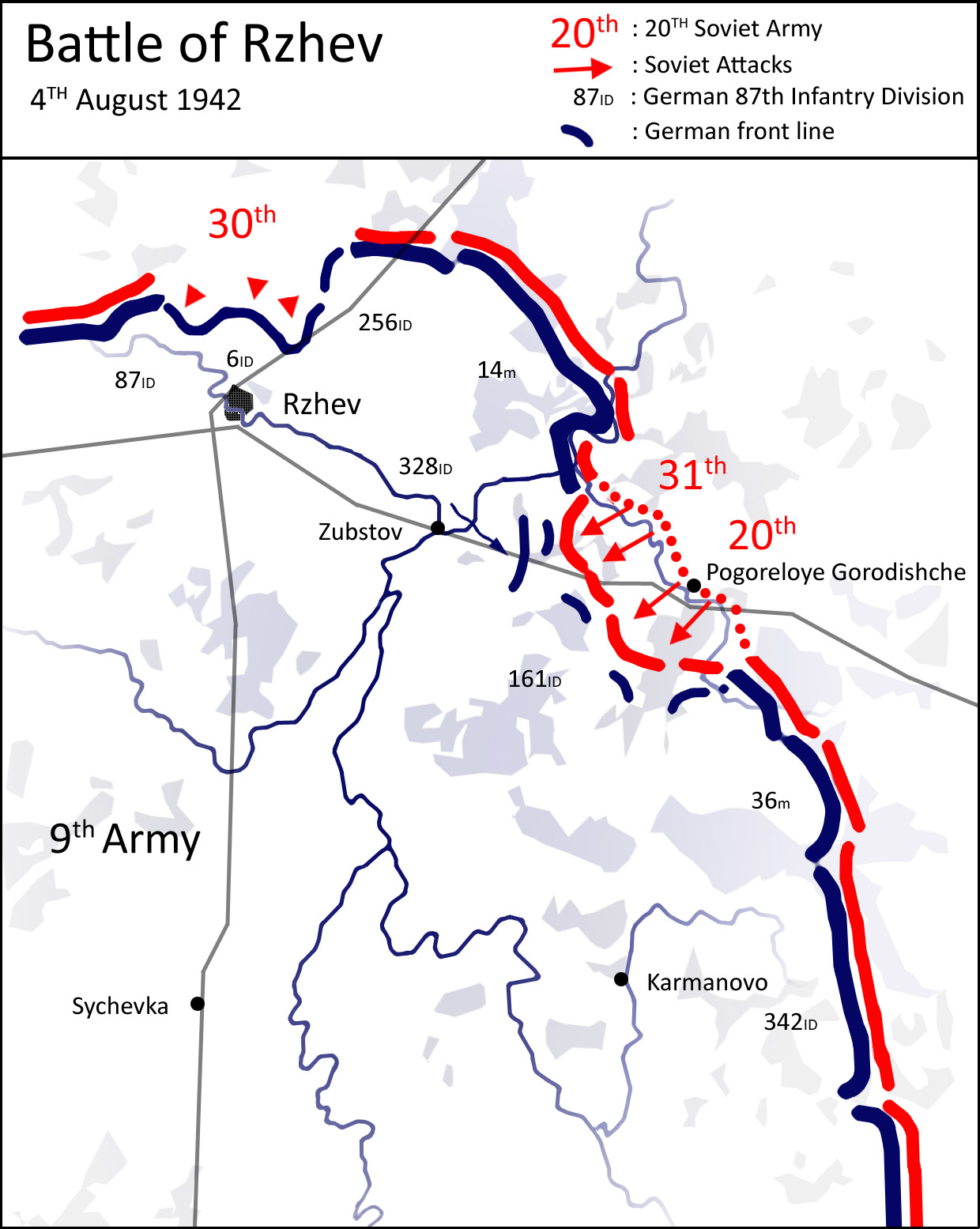
Attack of Western Front, August 4, 1942

At the beginning of July, following a discussion with Stalin, Zhukov had initiated planning for an offensive by 20th Army against the Rzhev salient to be called Operation "Sverdlovsk". This was intended primarily as a means to draw German reserves from their developing offensive in the south, but as it developed Zhukov's plan anticipated advances towards Rzhev, Sychyovka and Gzhatsk. In its final form the operation was to include the 29th and 30th Armies of Kalinin Front to the north and the 31st and 20th Armies of Western Front to the south. Kalinin Front began its offensive on July 30, but on the same day heavy rains began which flooded the countryside and turned the roads into quagmires. After waiting for the weather to abate Western Front attacked on August 4 following a powerful artillery preparation which destroyed or suppressed roughly 80 percent of the German forces' weapons. 8th Guards Corps, in the first echelon of 20th Army, breached the defenses south of Pogoreloe Gorodishche allowing the Army's mobile group, the 2nd Guards Cavalry Corps, to begin to exploit in the direction of Sychyovka. 31st Army was similarly successful to the north and by the end of August 6 the gap in the German front was up to 30 km wide and Soviet troops had penetrated to a depth of 25 km, closing on the Gzhat and Vazuza rivers.

Colonel Orestov left the division on August 8 and was replaced by Col. Basan Badminovich Gorodovikov. This officer, of Kalmyk nationality, had previously served as commander of the 71st Cavalry Regiment and the 1st Crimean Partisan Area. 20th Army had intended to liberate Sychyovka on August 7 but by now the German High Command was reacting with alarm and the offensive began drawing German reserves. 8th Guards Rifle Corps ran into elements of the 1st Panzer Division as it continued to advance and on August 9 and 10 the roughly 800 tanks under Western Front met counterattacks by about 700 panzers; the Soviet armor lacked adequate signals equipment and command facilities which limited its effectiveness. The counterattack was eventually repulsed but the Soviet forces in turn were unable to make much headway. On August 23 the Army, in cooperation with elements of 5th Army, broke through the German grouping at Karmanovo and liberated that town. Although this date is given as the official end of the offensive in Soviet histories, in fact 20th Army persisted in efforts to penetrate the German front and attack Gzhatsk from the west before going over to the defense on September 8. In total during the period from August 4 to September 10 the 20th Army suffered a total of 60,453 personnel killed, wounded and missing-in-action.

=== Operation Mars ===
The division later participated in the Second Rzhev–Sychevka Offensive Operation in November 1942. 20th Army, now under command of Maj. Gen. N. I. Kiryukhin, was assigned the main task along the east face of the Rzhev salient; it was to drive across the Vazuza and create a breach for its mobile forces to exploit and pinch off the northern part of the salient in conjunction with Kalinin Front from the west. The 251st, along with the 42nd Guards Rifle Division, was to assault the German positions at and north of Grediakino, while the 326th Rifle Division pinned down the German forces in Vaselki. The division would be directly supported by the 83rd Tank Brigade, and the infantry assaults would be led by penal battalions and companies despite the misgivings of Kiryukhin, as he was unsure how these troops would perform. A headlong assault was to propel the 251st and 42nd Guards through the German forward defenses in time to link up with their left flank neighbour's attack on the second German defensive position during the second day of the advance. After this position fell, four rifle divisions would cross the Rzhev–Sychyovka railroad line by day's end and the 251st and 42nd Guards, with the 326th, would wheel to the northwest to roll up the defenses. Altogether a 15–18 km wide breach in the German defenses would be created, allowing the commitment of the 6th Tank Corps and 2nd Guards Cavalry Corps into the German operational rear.

The offensive began at 0920 hours on November 25, in the narrow neck of land between the Vazuza and Osuga rivers. The German forces, consisting of the 195th Grenadier Regiment of the 102nd Infantry Division, were very well dug-in and, because of poor visibility due to fog and falling snow, the preparatory artillery bombardment had been relatively ineffective. The grenadiers reoccupied their forward positions just as the artillery lifted and met the advancing riflemen with heavy machine gun and rifle fire. Pre-registered German artillery fell on presumed assault routes, and diminishing snowfall allowed better observation; attack after attack was repulsed, until the fields were littered with hundreds of dead, plus tens of burnt-out tanks. By 1140 the attacks slackened and Gorodovikov's first echelon regiments had suffered heavy losses while making no progress at all toward Grediakino. Konev egged Kiryukhin to commit the divisions' second echelons, following a renewed artillery preparation, as greater success seemed to have been achieved on sectors to the south. During November 26 the 251st continued to fight along existing lines without any appreciable gains.

By November 29 the German forces facing the division had been reinforced by elements of 9th Panzer Division, making its task yet more difficult. During the day the incessant attacks of the 251st and 42nd Guards finally isolated the single panzergrenadier battalion in Grediakino and drove back German infantry on its long flank toward Vaselki, but at the cost of further losses of infantry and seven destroyed tanks. While the Germans were eventually forced to abandon Grediakino on November 30, the offensive was stalled. Lt. Gen. M. S. Khozin took over command of the Army on December 4. Zhukov was still determined to renew the offensive, and in his orders from the Front on December 8 he was directed:

... to penetrate enemy defenses in the Bol'shoe Kropotovo, Iarygino sector on 10 and 11 December, take Sychevka no later than 15 December, and move no fewer than two rifle divisions into the Andreevskoe sector on 20 December to work with Kalinin Front's 41st Army to seal the encirclement of the enemy.

To do so Zhukov provided Khozin with infantry reinforcements and the fresh 5th Tank Corps, which had previously been held in reserve as an exploitation force. On December 11, four rifle divisions went over to the attack on the Vazuza sector, but this did not include the 251st. In the event the attackers made scanty gains of 500 – 1,000 metres at significant cost, and failed to capture a single German-held fortified village. The 251st would require substantial rebuilding; in the period from November 25 to December 18 the division lost 765 men killed, 1,911 wounded, and 328 missing-in-action, for a total of 3,004 casualties.

== Into Western Russia and Belarus ==
During February 1943 the division was reassigned back to 31st Army, still in Western Front. During Operation Büffel, which began on March 1, Army Group Center made a phased evacuation of the Rzhev salient; while Western and Kalinin Fronts attempted to encircle and destroy elements of the retreating forces, they were too much weakened by the preceding battles to be effective. On March 8, units of 31st Army finally liberated Sychyovka. By mid-month the pursuit also became hampered by the spring rasputitsa. By March 31 Western Front's armies reached the German defenses at the base of the salient along the Dukhovshchina–Spas-Demensk line, and began to dig in. The 789th Artillery Regiment received the Order of the Red Banner on June 19 for general exemplary service. On July 27, Colonel Gorodovikov was moved to command the 85th Guards Rifle Division. He would be promoted to the rank of major general on October 16 and in mid-1944 he was reassigned to the 184th Rifle Division, which he led almost continuously into the postwar, being made a Hero of the Soviet Union on April 19, 1945. In 1946–47 he furthered his military education before taking command of the 12th Guards Mechanized Division. He would be further promoted to lieutenant general in 1959, retired in 1961, and died in Moscow in 1983. Col. Vasilii Nikitovich Zatylkin took over the 251st.

=== Operation Suvorov ===
By the beginning of August the 251st was part of the newly-forming 71st Rifle Corps in 31st Army, which also comprised the 82nd and 133rd Rifle Divisions. At this time the divisions of the Army averaged 6,500 – 7,000 personnel each. On August 7, the first day of Operation Suvorov, the only real Soviet success was achieved by 31st Army against XXXIX Panzer Corps in the Yartsevo sector. The main effort was made by the 36th and 45th Rifle Corps, with the 71st in second echelon. The attack gathered steam late in the day as the Corps attacked east of the Vop River. It faced the inexperienced 113th Infantry Division which had only been at the front for two weeks. Sensing confusion in the German ranks the commander of 31st Army, Maj. Gen. V. A. Gluzdovsky, committed his mobile group to break through to the Minsk-Moscow highway just 6 km to the south. For a brief moment it seemed the Army might achieve a breakthrough, but commitment of the 18th Panzergrenadier Division on August 8 stabilized the situation and by the end of the next day the two sides were stalemated.

On August 12, Lt. Col. Aleksandr Alekseevich Volkhin took over the division from Colonel Zatylkin. Volkhin had an unusual background. He was a pre-war major general and was appointed to command the 147th Rifle Division in May 1942. While leading this division in Stalingrad Front in July, defending the Don River near Surovikino, his troops were partially encircled and suffered heavy losses. Volkhin was arrested and condemned to death for having lost control of his unit, but this was commuted in December to 10 years imprisonment to be served after the war. In February 1943 he was released and returned to the front with the rank of major, almost immediately being promoted to lieutenant colonel, to take up the position of deputy commander of 927th Rifle Regiment. Within a week he was in command of the same regiment, and in March his sentence was annulled. His command of the 251st was not uninterrupted:

- August 12 – October 21, 1943.
- October 22–30, 1943. Colonel Zatylkin returned to command.
- October 31, 1943 – January 25, 1944. Volkhin restored to rank of major general on January 17.
- January 26 – February 15. Replaced by Col. Vladimir Naumovich Ratner, chief of staff.
- February 16 – July 11. Volkhin was then moved to command of 45th Rifle Corps and was replaced by Col. Evgenii Yakovlevich Birsteyn.

Within a few days the stalemate on the Smolensk front had become general. As of September 1 the 251st was reassigned to 45th Corps, joining the 88th Rifle Division.

Western Front's offensive finally resumed on September 15 and by the end of the day Yartsevo was liberated. 45th Corps was transferred to 68th Army on September 18 and over the following week the 68th and 31st Armies pressed to encircle Smolensk, which was finally taken early in the morning of September 25. During this month the division continued to advance towards the Belorussian border with 68th Army, but later that month 45th Corps rejoined the 31st Army.

=== Orsha Offensives ===
68th Army advanced westward south of the Dniepr River in early October with 45th Corps to the rear, closing up to the defenses of the German XXVII Army Corps late on October 8. The 88th Division reinforced an assault across the Mereya River, forcing the 18th Panzergrenadiers to withdraw westward but the German division took up new defensive positions along the Rossasenka River on October 11. 68th Army prepared to resume its attacks the next day, but by now the 45th Corps was marching north to rejoin 31st Army.

==== Second Orsha Offensive ====
The commander of the 31st, Maj. Gen. V. A. Gluzdovskii, now deployed his reinforced Army astride the Smolensk-Orsha highway with 36th Corps to the north, 71st Corps to the south, and 45th Corps plus the 220th Rifle Division in second echelon. The front began with an artillery preparation that lasted 85 minutes but failed to take the German forces by surprise. The Army's shock groups were stalled almost immediately without any appreciable gains and a further effort the next day did no better. After a regrouping the offensive recommenced on October 21, at which time the 220th was under 45th Corps command; the 88th and 251st Divisions were in first echelon and the 220th in second. The Corps was deployed astride both the highway and the nearby rail line in the center of the Army's sector. This effort was preceded by an artillery preparation of two hours and ten minutes, and the Army's lead divisions punched through the first defensive line of the 197th Infantry Division between the villages of Redki and Novaya, at considerable cost, and by early evening had penetrated 4 km deep on a front 1,000m wide toward the village of Kireevo, on the main rail line to Orsha. Two brigades of the 2nd Guards Tank Corps were committed into the penetration but were soon halted by heavy German fire from the flanks. The attack was resumed the next day but gained 1,000m at most. On October 24 the second echelon divisions were committed in a final effort to break the German defenses but failed in part due to artillery ammunition shortages. The offensive was halted at nightfall on October 26 by which time the offensive capabilities of 10th Guards and 31st Army were completely exhausted after gaining 4–6 km at a combined cost of 4,787 killed and 14,315 wounded.

==== Third Orsha Offensive ====
In early November Western Front prepared for another attempt to break through the German defenses. The front's first shock group consisted of the 10th Guards and 31st Armies on both sides of the Orsha highway, but by now their rifle divisions averaged only 4,500 personnel each. 45th Corps, south of Kireevo, faced the 119th Panzergrenadier Regiment of 25th Panzergrenadier Division. The 251st was in the first echelon when the attack began on November 14 after a three-and-a-half hour artillery and air preparation, but was soon stopped in its tracks due to heavy machine gun fire. The fighting continued over the next four days but 45th Corps gained no more than 400m at considerable cost. The STAVKA, however, ordered the offensive to continue, which it did beginning on November 30 after another regrouping. 31st and 10th Guards Armies were concentrated on a 12 km-wide sector from Osintori to the Dniepr, with the 31st focused on just 3 km of that with four divisions in first echelon and five in the second. In the event the attack made virtually no ground even after the second echelon was brought up, and the front went over to the defense on December 5. The failure of the Orsha offensives was ascribed, apart from the strength of the German defenses, to a lack of training of Red Army replacements and a stereotyped use of artillery which did more to warn the German forces of attacks than to actually inflict damage. During December the STAVKA ordered Western Front to shift its efforts towards Vitebsk.

=== Babinavichy Offensive ===
By the beginning of January 1944 the 251st, one of just four divisions remaining in 31st Army, had been assigned to the 114th Rifle Corps with the 88th Division, but by a month later it was under direct Army control. When the Front began planning a new offensive along an axis north of Babinavichy, Gluzdovskii was directed to form a shock group consisting of the 251st, 220th, and 42nd Rifle Divisions, to advance northwestward along the north bank of the Luchesa River to smash the defenses of the VI Army Corps' 256th Infantry Division and outflank the German grouping around Vysochany from the south. The offensive was set to begin on February 22 with the 220th and 251st in the first echelon and the 42nd Guards Tank Brigade in support. The assault fairly easily tore a 5 km-wide gap in the forward defenses of the 256th Infantry and by day's end the 251st, with its armor support, had penetrated to a depth of 2 km and reached the eastern edge of Vishni, forming a narrow gap in the 256th's defenses that that division was unable to close. The 42nd Division was committed into this gap but once again sparse German reserves were able to contain the advance even though it persisted into March. During its course 31st Army lost another 5,767 casualties, including 1,288 dead.

== Operation Bagration ==
At the beginning of April the division was in the 62nd Rifle Corps of 33rd Army, but Western Front was disbanded on April 11, and later that month the 251st was reassigned to the 65th Rifle Corps of 5th Army in 3rd Belorussian Front. By the start of June it had been moved again, now to the 72nd Rifle Corps of the same Army.

=== Vitebsk-Orsha Offensive ===
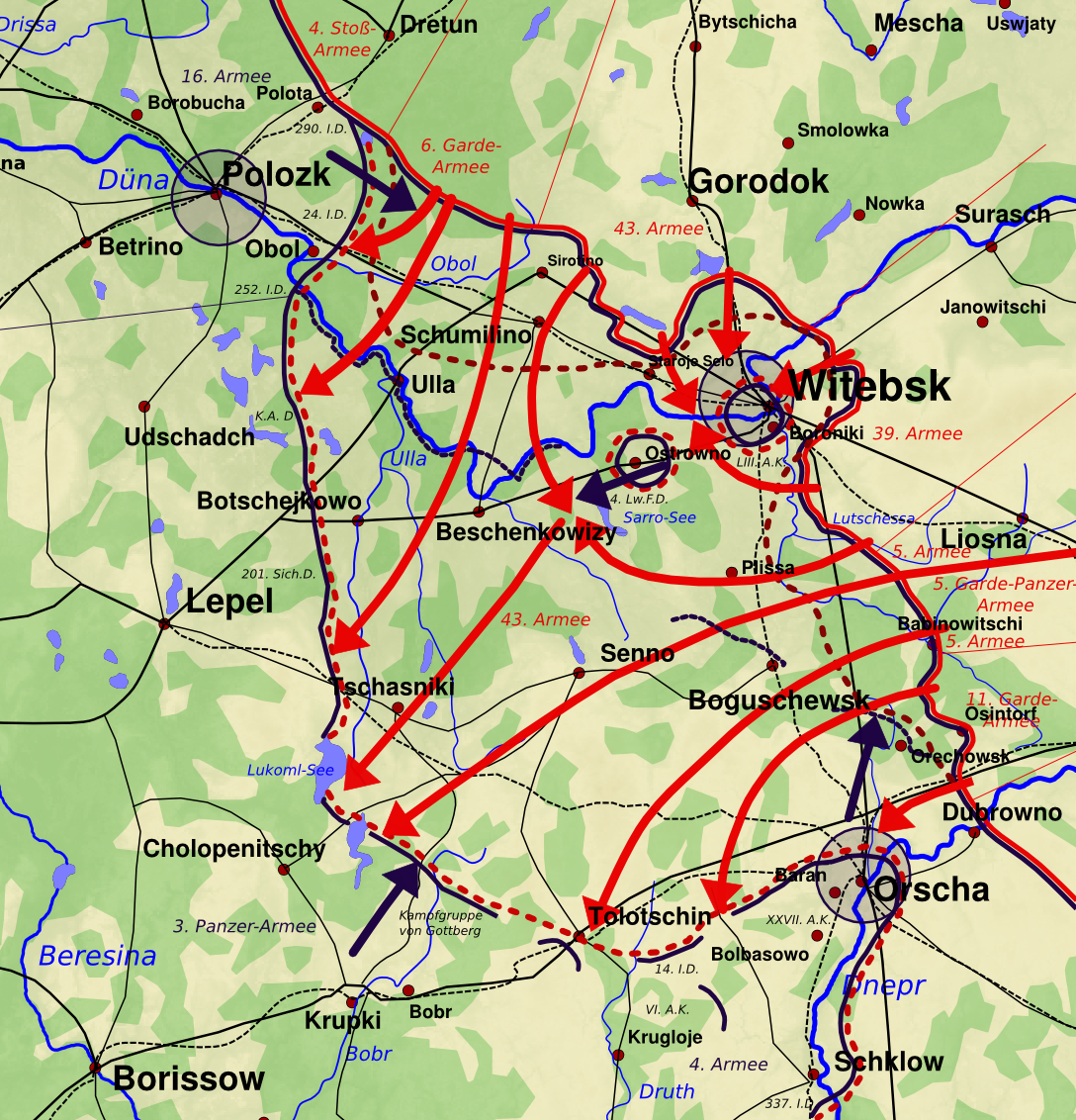
Vitebsk-Orsha Offensive. Note position of 39th Army.

On June 5 the 251st was transferred again, now serving in 5th Guards Rifle Corps of 39th Army in 1st Baltic Front. The initial objective of this Army was drive westwards to help pinch off the German-held salient at Vitebsk. Starting on June 23 the Corps smashed through the lines of the 197th Infantry Division's 347th Infantry Regiment on a 6 km-wide front and crossed the Luchesa River; the 251st was in second echelon and was committed at 1300 hours to protect the south flank of the advance. A counterattack by a regiment of the 95th Infantry Division, supported by tanks, was unsuccessful. The Corps linked up with 43rd Army the following day, trapping the Third Panzer Army in a pocket. During June 25 the two armies solidified their junction at Gnesdilovichi while fending off 18 attacks from the encircled force attempting to reestablish a corridor. On June 27 the two Soviet armies launched their final assault on Vitebsk, leading to the surrender of most of the German forces. A group of 5,000 Germans attempted to break out, but were soon surrounded and defeated by three rifle divisions, including the 251st. For its achievements in this battle, the division was given the name of the city as an honorific:

VITEBSK – ... 251st Rifle Division (Major General Volkhin, Aleksandr Alekseevich)... The troops who participated in the liberation of Vitebsk, by the order of the Supreme High Command of 26 June 1944 and a commendation in Moscow are given a salute of 20 artillery salvoes from 224 guns.

=== Baltic Offensive ===
On July 4 the STAVKA issued a new directive in which 1st Baltic Front was ordered to develop the offensive by launching its main attack in the direction of Švenčionys and Kaunas with the immediate task of capturing a line from Daugavpils to Pabradė by no later than July 10–12. It was then to continue the attack with its main forces on Kaunas as well as toward Panevėžys and Šiauliai. 39th Army was out of contact with organized German forces as it caught up with the remainder of the Front and on this date the 5th Guards Corps was in the Kalnik–Domzheritsy–Zyaboenye area. By July 19 it had crossed the eastern border of Lithuania near Švenčionys. Two weeks later, as the rate of advance slowed due to logistics and increasing resistance, the 251st was in the vicinity of Jonava, and 39th Army was returned to 3rd Belorussian Front. On August 12 the division was recognized for its role in the liberation of Kaunas with the award of the Order of the Red Banner. When the German Operation Doppelkopf began on August 15 the division was positioned at Širvintos. Later that month it was moved yet again, now to 43rd Army's 84th Rifle Corps in 1st Baltic Front.

==== Riga Offensive ====
By mid-September 43rd Army had advanced northward to the vicinity of Bauska in Latvia. As of the beginning of October 84th Corps had come under command of 4th Shock Army in the same Front. This Army was straddling the border of Latvia and Lithuania in the area of Žagarė. 4th Shock was not directly involved in the liberation of Riga on October 13 but for their roles in holding off German relief efforts the 919th Rifle Regiment was awarded the Order of Kutuzov, 3rd Degree, on October 22, while the 923rd Regiment was given the Order of Alexander Nevsky. The 251st remained under command of 4th Shock and 84th Corps until December when it ended its peregrinations, assigned to the 60th Rifle Corps in 2nd Guards Army of 3rd Belorussian Front. It would remain under these commands for the duration. On January 5, 1945, Colonel Birsteyn took over command of the 334th Rifle Division and was replaced by Col. Nikolai Mikhailovich Sobenko.

== East Prussian Campaigns ==
When the East Prussian Offensive was launched on January 13, 60th Rifle Corps (154th, 251st and 334th Rifle Divisions) was assigned to defend along a broad front to the north of Goldap while the remainder of 2nd Guards Army followed 28th Army's breakthrough of the German lines; the 251st and its Corps followed in second echelon. On February 24 Colonel Sobenko handed his command over to Maj. Gen. Aleksei Prokofevich Moskalenko.

=== Battle of Königsberg ===
In the second half of March, in the lead-up to the assault on Königsberg, 60th Corps advanced along a route from Preussisch Eylau to Domnau, Tapiau, and Granz. General Moskalenko was in turn replaced on March 29 by Col. Nikolai Nikolaevich Degtyaryov. On April 5 the 251st was awarded the Order of Suvorov, 2nd Degree, in recognition of its role in the capture of Preussisch Eylau. On the same date the 927th Rifle Regiment received the Order of the Red Banner for its part in the fighting around the Masurian Lakes.

During the assault on Königsberg on April 7, the division assisted in forcing the Tierenberger River and reached the area north of Norgau. Once the city fell, the 251st took part in the clearing of the Samland Peninsula beginning on April 13 as part of the Zemland Group of Forces. On April 15 the division received its final commander, Col. Afanasii Pavlovich Skrynnik, who would hold this post until it was disbanded. In recognition of their earlier roles in the destruction of German forces southwest of Königsberg, on August 26 the 923rd Rifle Regiment was given the Order of Kutuzov, 3rd Degree, while the 927th Regiment received the Order of Alexander Nevsky.

== Postwar ==
The division ended the war as the 251st Rifle Vitebsk, Order of the Red Banner, Order of Suvorov Division (Russian: 251-я стрелковая Витебская Краснознамённая ордена Суворова дивизия). It became part of the Don Military District with the 60th Corps and was located in Shchelkovskaya. It moved to Elista, where it became the 29th Rifle Brigade and was disbanded in March 1947.
