= Samland =

Samland may refer to:

- Sambia Peninsula
- Bishopric of Samland
- Samland District (Landkreis Samland), East Prussia
- SS Samland
- Corps Task Force Samland of XXVIII Army Corps (Wehrmacht)
