= 262nd Division =

262nd Division may refer to:

- 262nd Infantry Division, Wehrmacht, Germany
- 262nd Rifle Division, Soviet Union

== See also ==
- List of military divisions by number
