= Joachim-Friedrich =

Joachim-Friedrich is a German masculine given name, and may refer to:

- Joachim Frederick, Elector of Brandenburg (1564-1608), German elector
- Joachim-Friedrich Huth (1896–1962), German soldier
- Joachim-Friedrich Lang (1899–1945), German general

== See also ==
- Joachim Frederick, Elector of Brandenburg
