= 242nd Rifle Division =

242nd Rifle Division (June 27, 1941 – December 27, 1941) 242nd Rifle Division (January 3, 1942 – August 29, 1942) 242nd Mountain Rifle Division (August 29, 1942 – 1946)
- Active: 1941–1946
- Country: Soviet Union
- Branch: Red Army
- Type: Infantry
- Role: Mountain Infantry
- Size: Division
- Engagements: Battle of Smolensk (1941); Operation Typhoon; Second Battle of Kharkov; Case Blue; Battle of the Caucasus; Novorossiysk-Taman operation Kerch–Eltigen operation Crimean offensive Battle of the Dukla Pass; Western Carpathian offensive Moravia–Ostrava offensive Prague offensive
- Decorations: Order of the Red Banner (242nd Mountain); Order of Kutuzov (242nd Mountain)
- Battle honours: Taman (242nd Mountain)

Commanders
- Notable commanders: Maj. Gen. Kirill Alekseevich Kovalenko; Col. Anatolii Mikhailovich Kashkin; Col. Georgii Gavrilovich Kurashvili; Maj. Gen. Viktor Bogdanovich Lisinov

The 242nd Rifle Division was the lowest-numbered infantry division of the Red Army to be formed from scratch following the German invasion of the USSR. It was largely based on what would become the shtat (table of organization and equipment) of July 29, 1941 and was very quickly assigned to the new 30th Army of Western Front. Despite many shortages of equipment and specialist personnel, and a near-complete absence of formation training, the division joined the active army on July 15, thrown into the fighting near Smolensk. In late August and early September it took part on the Front's offensives toward Dukhovshchina, in an ultimately unsuccessful effort to encircle and destroy a large part of the German 9th Army. At the start of Operation Typhoon on October 2 it was defending part of the sector attacked by 9th Army and 3rd Panzer Group south of Bely and was quickly overwhelmed. After fighting in encirclement for most of the rest of the month its remaining men were able to break out and reach Soviet-held territory, but the losses were to too great to justify rebuilding and the division was disbanded.

A new 242nd was formed in the first days of 1942 in the North Caucasus Military District by redesignating a 400-series division. It moved to the front in late April and soon took part in 38th Army's mostly unsuccessful efforts to rescue the Red Army forces trapped in the Izium salient. It then faced two preliminary operations of Army Group South before being encircled in the first weeks of Case Blue. Sufficient of its forces escaped that it was not disbanded, but instead were reorganized as the 242nd Mountain Rifle Division, again in the North Caucasus Military District. It was soon assigned to block the German forces on the Mount Elbrus axis, and from January to October, 1943 took part in the long, attritional struggle for the Taman Peninsula, where it won a battle honor. As part of the Separate Coastal Army it crossed into the Crimea and was decorated for its role in the liberation of Kerch in April 1944, and several of its subunits were also distinguished in the battles for Sevastopol. After being transferred to 4th Ukrainian Front it fought through the Carpathian Mountains and into Czechoslovakia during the winter and spring of 1945, gaining further honors along its combat path. The 242nd Mountain Rifle Division was moved to the Carpathian Ukraine soon after the end of the war, where it was disbanded in 1946.

== 1st Formation ==
The division started forming on June 27, 1941, just five days after the start of the German offensive, at Kalinin in the Moscow Military District. Maj. Gen. Kirill Alekseevich Kovalenko was appointed to command the same day; he had been serving as the Red Army's Deputy Inspector of Infantry for most of the previous year, and he would remain in command for the duration of the first formation. Once formed the division had the following order of battle:

- 897th Rifle Regiment
- 900th Rifle Regiment
- 903rd Rifle Regiment
- 769th Artillery Regiment
- 772nd Howitzer Artillery Regiment
- 300th Antitank Battalion
- 519th Antiaircraft Battalion
- 321st Reconnaissance Battalion
- 410th Sapper Battalion
- 662nd Signal Battalion
- 240th Chemical Defense (Anti-gas) Company
- 500th Auto Transport Battalion
- 673rd Field Postal Station
- 316th Field Office of the State Bank

It is noteworthy that no medical/sanitation battalion, field bakery, or veterinary hospital is listed. On July 21 the commander of 30th Army, Maj. Gen. V. A. Khomenko, ordered each of his reserve rifle divisions (242nd, 250th and 251st) to receive a tank battalion from the 110th Tank Division. These battalions were supposed to consist of two companies, one of 10 T-34s and one of 10 BT or T-26 light tanks, plus a BT or T-26 as a headquarters tank.

Khomenko would later report on the circumstances under which his three divisions arrived at the fighting front, being required to move up to 350km on foot to their concentration areas and "were taken from their assembly points in the very midst of assembly, and, incomplete, they did not approach being 'knocked together' and went into battle unprepared for combat." Khomenko went on to enumerate the many deficiencies of the 251st, but added that the 242nd was only slightly more combat ready. Severe shortages existed in field guns and mortars, and ammunition of all types was short. Furthermore, of the roughly 60 tanks distributed from 110th Tanks, by August 5 only 10 remained operable. He went on to note:

1. 30th Army received its combat mission while it was forming and assembling. Because the army was formed from poorly-trained reservists, the army's combat capabilities when it received its combat mission were not at the proper level as was confirmed by the outcome of combat operations.
2. The provisioning of the army with weapons and combat equipment was unsatisfactory...
3. Providing the army with all that was suitable and necessary by higher level supply organs occurred very slowly, partially, and was of insufficient quality.

Glantz comments that "These candid reports about the combat state of 30th Army will largely explain why 30th Army operates as it does during the Western Front's three counteroffensives during late July, August, and early September 1941. Given these facts, the army's performance was nothing short of amazing."

=== Battle of Smolensk ===
The 242nd officially joined the active army on July 15, less than three weeks after beginning to form up. On the same day, the lead elements of 2nd Panzer Group's 29th Motorized Division reached the southern part of Smolensk. Over the following days German pressure mounted against the three armies of Western Front, commanded by Marshal S. K. Timoshenko, which were almost entirely encircled in that region. On July 19 the commander of Reserve Front, Lt. Gen. I. A. Bogdanov, was alerted by the STAVKA to begin preparing an offensive operation with his 29th, 30th and 28th Armies to rescue Timoshenko's force. The 30th, starting from its concentration area north of the Western Dvina River, was to advance toward Demidov.

The following day, on behalf of the STAVKA, Army Gen. G. K. Zhukov sent a directive to Timoshenko, who was now acting a commander of the Western Direction. Four reserve armies, including the 30th (now designated as "Group Khomenko"), were to launch attacks toward Dukhovshchina and Smolensk along converging axes. Khomenko was to attack southward from the region southwest of Bely to reach the Maksimovka–Petropole line by the end of July 22 before pushing on toward Dukhovshchina the next morning. A report from 0600 hours on July 23 indicated that the 242nd was still on the march toward Bely. A further report two days later stated that the Army was engaged in fighting with German motorized infantry 2km north of Chernyi Ruchei, and that the division had reached the Sergeevka line, 20km southwest of Bely, facing a battalion of infantry reinforced with an artillery battery and 25-30 mortars. In orders issued by Timoshenko at 0240 hours on July 26 the division was to attack toward Chalishchev, Berezovka, and Boldino and retake the region around the latter place, 30km south-southwest of Bely. During that day and the next 30th Army recorded some tactical successes in advances of 5–15km against the dug-in company-size battlegroups of 18th Motorized Division. By July 31 it was clear that the offensive to recover Smolensk and rescue the three nearly encircled armies had failed, but had also forced Army Group Center's two panzer groups to a near standstill.

The next day the Army Group began its final effort to seal off the Smolensk pocket and liquidate the forces within it. In a report issued by Timoshenko at 2000 hours on August 3 it was reported that 30th Army had attacked with its main forces in the morning, overcoming strong German resistance, and that the 242nd had blown up an ammunition dump in the Zhidki area with its artillery fire. As the remnants of the 16th and 20th Armies escaped on August 4 the armies outside, including the 30th, were ordered to attack to pin down the German forces on their fronts; Khomenko was directed to use his left wing to push toward Krasigovo (15 km west of Dukhovshchina) and reach a line north-northeast of the latter place on August 6, despite the fact that this was utterly unrealistic. An operational summary issued on the morning of August 8 gave the division's position as "Morokhovo Station, Novoe Morokhovo, and Dolgoe, with one battalion of 900th RR in the Klintsy region." As of August 5, the division's tank battalion was down to six T-26s, two of which needed repair. After less than 10 days of attacks it had lost 387 men killed or missing and 3,042 wounded, amounting to roughly a third of its authorized strength.

=== Dukhovshchina Offensives ===
As of August 8 the divisions of XXXIX Motorized Corps which had been facing 30th Army had been relieved by the infantry divisions of 9th Army's V Army Corps. These divisions were very hard pressed to parry the attacks of Khomenko's forces and Lt. Gen. I. S. Konev's 19th Army east and northeast of Dukhovshchina. In the wake of these assaults the commander of Army Group Center noted "9th Army was also attacked; the day before yesterday the Russians broke through as far as the 5th Division's artillery positions." The chief of staff of OKH, Col. Gen. F. Halder, noted on August 11 in regard to these attacks:

The whole situation makes it increasingly plain that we have underestimated the Russian colossus, who consistently prepared for war with that utterly ruthless determination so characteristic of totalitarian states... At the outset of war, we reckoned with about 200 enemy divisions. Now we have already counted 360. These divisions indeed are not armed and equipped according to our standards, and their tactical leadership is often poor. But they are there, and if we smash a dozen of them, the Russians simply put up another dozen.

Timoshenko began planning for a renewed effort on August 14 which was intended to recapture Dukhovshchina en route to Smolensk. The STAVKA ordered this to be coordinated with Zhukov's Reserve Front on August 17 in order to engulf the entire front from Toropets in the north to Bryansk in the south. In the event, due to the chaotic situation, Timoshenko was forced to conduct the operation in piecemeal fashion and was unable to establish close cooperation with Zhukov.

The operational directive set the goal of encircling and destroying the German 106th, 5th, and 28th Infantry Divisions and 900th Lehr Regiment through concentric attacks with two shock groups, the northern consisting of the 30th Army's 242nd, 251st and 162nd Rifle Divisions, 107th Tank and 45th Cavalry Divisions. The Army was to protect its right flank toward Bely with the 250th Division, penetrate the German defense and then commit the mobile forces to encircle the objective from the west. The attack sector was 17km wide from Markovo to Staroe Morokhovo, from 38km to 55km north of Yartsevo. The 242nd, which had the support of the 1st Battalion of the 392nd Cannon Artillery Regiment, was to hold a line with one rifle regiment while the remaining two made the assault toward Erkhovo and Churkino with the immediate objective of reaching the Rekta River at Staroe Sochnevo. The attack was to be preceded by a 45-minute artillery preparation beginning at 0900 hours. The shock group faced the German 106th Infantry, which was holding a sector roughly 16km wide.

General Khomenko launched his attack on time, despite not all of his forces having managed to reach their jumping-off points. Several units were fed in piecemeal, which in some instances worked to their advantage, since the artillery preparation had done more to alert German units than it accomplished in causing damage. While 19th Army managed to penetrate the German tactical defenses throughout its sector, 30th Army achieved far more limited results due to intense machine gun and mortar fire, backed by effective artillery fire on most sectors. The 242nd, in common with the 162nd and 251st, only advanced from 150m-400m, but the 107th Tanks, in cooperation with one regiment of the 162nd, was successful in penetrating the defensive line and exploited roughly 4km deep. Timoshenko's headquarters reported at 2000 hours that the 242nd had advanced up to 200m but had been halted in front of the barbed wire by heavy fire.

The Army attempted to resume its offensive at 0900 on August 18, but Khomenko's evening report reveals very little progress:

242nd RD - 900th RR captured Hill 212.2 at 0945 hours on 18 August but was driven out of its jumping-off positions at 1045 hours by an attacking enemy reinforced battalion, supported by artillery and mortar fire.

Overall, although 19th Army continued to make some gains, the 30th could not say the same. In addition, German reserves, such as the 35th Infantry Division, were arriving in the sector. Again, on the following day, although the 162nd Rifle and 107th Tank Divisions managed to cover another 2 km, the remaining divisions stalled against heavy resistance, and the belated arrival of the reinforcing 244th Rifle Division did nothing to assist because it had not yet regrouped after its long approach march. At 1600 hours the 242nd was reported as advancing forward slowly after capturing Hill 200.0, southwest of Zhidki. Under the pressure of the offensive the German 9th Army had no choice but to call on the only available reserve, the 7th Panzer Division.

Army Group Center began its counterstroke on August 20. By noon the 7th Panzer was concentrated north of Losevo with roughly 110 tanks (mostly Panzer 38(t) types), preparing to strike the right flank of 19th Army. This attack drove into the heart of the Army's antitank defenses and was driven off with significant losses. Meanwhile, 30th Army maintained its offensive pressure as best it could. The next day, as the dogfight with 7th Panzer continued, Timoshenko decided that, since it appeared that 30th Army's attacks were going nowhere, it would be more useful to transfer its fresh forces to 19th Army's sector; on August 22 he permitted Khomenko to take a day to rest and refit. At the end of the day the 242nd was reported as being in the Staroe Morokhovo–Novoe Morokhovo–Zhidki region. 19th Army resumed the attack on August 23 and 30th Army recorded some minor gains, with the division pushing toward Erkhovo and Marker 215.2 in cooperation with the 250th Rifle and 107th Tank Divisions. However, by the end of the day word had reached Timoshenko that 22nd Army, which was supposed to be advancing south of Velikiye Luki, was in fact facing defeat from the forces of 3rd Panzer Group moving northward.

Despite this impending crisis, Stalin, the STAVKA, and Timoshenko remained confident that their armies could collapse Army Group Center's defenses east of Smolensk, and so persisted in their offensive preparations. At 0145 hours on August 25 Khomenko dispatched a warning order to his subordinates which included:

242nd RD - defend the Staroe Morokhovo and Novoe Morokhovo sector to protect the right flank of the army's shock group and attack toward Churkino and Kostino on the left wing.

Near the end of the day it was reported that the division, "overcoming fierce enemy resistance", captured the eastern outskirts of Erkhovo by 1700, before beginning fighting to capture the rest of the village. This was part of a combined attack by the Army's five divisions on a 7km-wide sector against 106th Infantry Division which gained up to 2.5km and forced the German division back to its second defensive line. The assault resumed just past noon of the following day, although only part of the 242nd was involved. It was reported as having "attacked toward Churkino from the northeast with its left wing; and reached the brushy region (1 kilometre northeast of Churkino) by 1500 hours." Altogether, 30th Army forced the right wing of the damaged 106th Infantry to bend but not break, but at the cost to itself of 182 men killed and wounded. A further effort by the division on August 28 was unsuccessful.

==== Second Offensive ====
Timoshenko, determined to carry out his design and press the advantages he had won, issued orders to Western Front to prepare to resume the offensive on September 1 after regrouping. 30th Army was directed to make its main attack toward Demidov, with the objective of reaching that place as well as Velizh by the end of September 8. As part of the regrouping Khomenko ordered the 134th Rifle Division to relieve the 242nd's units along the Demekhi and Novoe Morokhovo line while the division in turn relieved the 250th's units in the Hill 215.2 and Shelepy sector, prior to attacking to capture Churkino, Kostino, and Hill 229.6. After an artillery preparation, four armies of the Front went back to the general offensive between 0700 and 0900 hours. 30th Army had the 242nd, 162nd and 251st Rifle and 107th Tank Divisions in first echelon, with the 250th in reserve, facing the German 106th and 35th Divisions. The 242nd encountered strong German resistance and machine gun fire; by 1535 hours the 897th Regiment was reported as being 500m from the northeastern outskirts of Churkino, the 903rd Regiment at the eastern outskirts of Shelepy, and the 900th Regiment in second echelon behind the 903rd. The latter objective was taken at 1900 hours. Despite generally poor results for his Army on this first day, Khomenko ordered the division to concentrate its main effort on September 2 toward Hill 215.2 and Churkino in cooperation with the 162nd, beginning at 0800. In the event, the 30th effectively stalled on this second day. As the offensive ran down, at 1700 hours the next day Khomenko was able to report that the 242nd had partly enveloped Churkino from the north, south and east and was fighting to capture the strongpoint. An operational pause ensued on September 4, but when the Army returned to the attack on the 5th it made no gains at all, at the cost of 131 men killed or wounded. Finally, at 0335 on September 10 the STAVKA ordered Western Front to go over to the defense.

=== Operation Typhoon ===
Khomenko issued his defense order to his Army on September 11 to firmly defend its present positions, while continuing to fortify strongpoints, antitank, rear and cutoff positions, and to entrench deeply to prevent any penetration toward Bely and Kaniutino. The 242nd was specifically assigned to defend Hill 200.8, Orlovo, Shelepy, and Shestaki region. However, being weakened by its offensive battles, the Army's defense was fragile, as it was deployed in a single echelon with the 162nd Division in reserve. In a report produced by the Army's military council on September 6 the division was criticized for poor collection of intelligence, to the point of appointing a procurator to investigate if criminal proceedings would be justified.

The front west of Moscow was generally quiet through the balance of September as Army Groups Center and South focused on the encirclement and destruction of Southwestern Front east of Kyiv. By the end of the month 30th Army was defending a 66 km-wide sector with four divisions; 19th Army remained on its left (south) flank. General Khomenko correctly determined, due to the terrain, that the Kaniutino axis was likely where the main German attack would come. At the expense of a critical weakening of the Army's other sectors the 162nd was moved from reserve to deploy on this flank in two echelons on a frontage of only 6.5 km, with one regiment of the 242nd also in the first echelon. In addition to being badly overstretched, the Army was experiencing an acute shortage of artillery, rifles, and engineering assets. Although the STAVKA believed the main German attack would come along the Smolensk–Vyazma highway, in fact it would be aimed at the 19th/30th Army boundary.

Khomenko decided to fire a preemptive artillery bombardment between 1100 and 1130 hours on October 1 in an effort to disrupt the German forces which, by then, were clearly massing against his left flank. While Khomenko's headquarters claimed significant damage had been inflicted, a good deal of the Army's available ammunition was also expended. Operation Typhoon began at 0530 hours on October 2, and the Army boundary was struck by 3rd Panzer Group and 9th Army as Khomenko expected. As early as 1330 he reported to Western Front:

The enemy with up to two infantry divisions supported by tanks and up to 120 aircraft penetrated the front of the 162nd and 242nd Rifle Divisions. By 1130 they had reached the line Krapivnia-Aklimovo-River Osotnia.
The 242nd Rifle Division's 897th Rifle Regiment and the 162nd Rifle Division's 501st Rifle Regiment are fighting in encirclement.

While the overall attack front was up to 45 km wide the main breakthrough sector was only 16 km wide. The front of the 242nd was struck by the 6th Infantry and 1st Panzer Divisions of XXXXI Motorized Corps, followed by the 36th Motorized Division. The positions of the 897th's 1st Battalion were attacked by up to a regiment of motorized infantry supported by 70 tanks. Almost every soldier of the Battalion was killed in the unequal struggle, but they refused to abandon their positions; the radio operator, who was reporting the situation to regimental headquarters, announced in his final message, "I'm blowing up the set. Farewell, dear comrades." Overall, the Kaniutino axis was attacked by four German corps consisting of 12 divisions, including three panzer divisions (460-470 tanks) and one motorized division, simultaneously. Shortly after, the 9th Army's VI Army Corps began pushing toward Bely.

At 1630 hours Khomenko issued combat orders to his forces to counterattack the German penetrations, specifying that the reserve 107th Motorized Rifle Division (formerly 107th Tank Division) cooperate with the 242nd. In the event, the 107th bumped into advancing German units overnight and did not reach the 242nd's positions. Unable to even take up new defenses along the Vop River the Army's left flank divisions began to retreat to the east. Soviet air reconnaissance early in the morning discovered a German column 20 km behind the former front lines, with its head at Krutitsy, 22 km further along. General Konev, now in command of Western Front, now resolved to stage a counterstroke against the penetration using Front reserves along with the 30th Army from the north and 19th Army from the south. The 242nd and 107th Motorized were to attack in the direction of Baturino and by the end of October 4 to restore the front along the Votria River. The reserves, led by Lt. Gen. I. V. Boldin, were intended to provide most of the fighting force, but were located as far as 55 km from the breakthrough area. Thus, the two divisions were left to attack unassisted by anything besides surviving elements of the 162nd Division. Boldin's Group was largely intercepted by advancing German forces (significantly underestimated in numbers by Western Front) long before reaching its assembly areas.

At 0719 hours on October 5 General Khomenko reported to Konev that the 242nd, 107th Motorized, and 250th Divisions had been fighting in encirclement for two days. They had run out of ammunition. German forces had seized Bely the day before and under the circumstances he requested permission for the three divisions to break out and withdraw to the northeast. Later that day the remnants of the 242nd reached the Bely–Vyazma road and found it in German hands. General Kovalenko tried to reach Khomenko by radio to receive instructions, but the reply he received was "Wait." It was later learned that this was a fake reply broadcast from a German transmitter, but it held the division in place until noon on October 6 when Kovalenko took the decision to destroy its heavy weapons and break out to the east. On October 7 the three divisions, still encircled, passed to the command of 31st Army as the 30th Army headquarters went into reserve.

As of October 10 the 242nd, 162nd and 251st Rifle Divisions remained encircled by the German 6th and 110th Infantry Divisions west of the Rzhev–Vyazma road. The following day the 6th Infantry pushed the rearguards of the 242nd and 162nd towards Rzhev. Already, the 9th Army was so overstretched that it could not spare the manpower to mop up the pocket, which was simply surrounded by a thin cordon of detachments from various infantry divisions. On October 27 the remnants of the three divisions attacked northward and successfully fought their way out to the lines of 29th Army before the end of the month. In addition to embarrassing the 9th Army command this escape caused considerable confusion and damage in its rear echelons. While the 251st retained enough strength to be rebuilt, the 242nd and 162nd had to be disbanded. Kovalenko went on to serve as chief of staff of Stalingrad Front the following year and eventually reached the rank of lieutenant general in 1946. In common with most of the divisions destroyed in Operation Typhoon the 242nd officially remained on the books until it was officially stricken on December 27.

== 2nd Formation ==
A new 242nd began forming on January 3, 1942, at Grozny in the North Caucasian Military District, based on the 465th Rifle Division. Once formed its order of battle was similar to that of the 1st formation:

- 897th Rifle Regiment
- 900th Rifle Regiment
- 903rd Rifle Regiment
- 769th Artillery Regiment
- 300th Antitank Battalion
- 73rd Antiaircraft Battery
- 147th Mortar Battalion
- 164th Mortar Battalion
- 321st Reconnaissance Company
- 410th Sapper Battalion
- 662nd Signal Battalion
- 275th Medical/Sanitation Battalion
- 240th Chemical Defense (Anti-gas) Company
- 500th Auto Transport Company
- 257th Field Bakery
- 298th Divisional Veterinary Hospital
- 1659th Field Postal Station
- 1603rd Field Office of the State Bank

Col. Anatolii Mikhailovich Kashkin had already been appointed to command of the 465th and remained in command of the new 242nd. He had previously served as chief of staff of the Odessa Military District before being wounded in late August, 1941. The division remained in the North Caucasus forming and training until April, when it was assigned to the reserves of Southern Front, joining the active army on April 28.

=== Second Battle of Kharkiv ===
The Southwestern Front launched an offensive on May 12 to retake the city of Kharkiv largely from its positions in the Izium-Barvenkovo salient that had been won during January. Although not directly involved in the offensive, Southern Front had its 9th and 57th Armies in the southern half of the salient. On the morning of May 17 the 1st Panzer Army went over to the counteroffensive against 9th Army in order to cut off the salient and destroy the forces within it, in preparation for its own summer offensive. By the time the 242nd arrived in the vicinity of Kunie on May 20 much of the damage had already been done and 9th Army was reeling back under massive pressure.

In the afternoon of May 22 the German pincers met, cutting off the remaining forces in the salient. Marshal Timoshenko, who was in overall command of the Soviet operation, ordered the commander of 38th Army, Maj. Gen. K. S. Moskalenko, to form a relief force under his deputy commander, Maj. Gen. G. I. Sherstiuk. Group Sherstiuk consisted of the 242nd and the 114th Tank Brigade; two other tank brigades were supposed to arrive from STAVKA reserves but did not show. The Group's forces immediately crossed to the right bank of the Northern Donets River in the Savintsy area and took the remnants of 64th Tank Brigade under command. This brigade had withdrawn from the Chepel region but, with an energetic attack supported by the rest of the Group, regained its previous positions. Since the 242nd was still deploying, no further gains were made.

During May 23 Group Sherstiuk, facing the 14th Panzer Division, was reinforced by detachments of the 199th and 304th Rifle Divisions. A Soviet after-action account states:

On this day, the left flank forces of Gen Moskalenko's 38th Army operated indecisively and were not only unable to achieve any substantial success, but also abandoned Chepel by the close of the day, under pressure of the enemy onslaught.

In accordance with Timoshenko's combat order No. 00330 of May 24, the encircled forces (Group "South") was to employ its main forces to deliver a blow against Savintsy and penetrate the German cordon; at the same time Group Sherstiuk, now further reinforced with the 3rd Tank Brigade, was to advance once again to link up with those units who were breaking out. The breakout effort ran into a renewed German effort to liquidate the pocket and Group "South" was forced back to the west. During May 24–27 Group Sherstiuk repeatedly and unsuccessfully attempted to break through the German defenses covering Chepel in the face of heavy machine gun fire and powerful air attacks. Only small groups were able to filter out from the pocket before May 28, when a better-organized force managed to reach the vicinity of Volobuevka. At the same time, Group Sherstiuk managed to penetrate the outer encirclement on a front about 1,000m wide against stiff resistance, and over the following hours some 22,000 Red Army officers and men were able to escape through the narrow corridor.

=== Case Blue ===
At the start of June the 242nd was still in 38th Army, although Group Sherstiuk had been disbanded. As a preliminary to Army Group South's summer offensive its 6th Army launched Operation Wilhelm on June 10 in order to gain positions on the east bank of the Northern Donets. The offensive primarily aimed at 28th Army to the north of the 38th, but the III Motorized Corps planned its breakthrough on the sector of the 38th's 277th Rifle Division. The Army was attempting to defend a 60 km-wide sector from east of Chuhuiv to west of Izium with five divisions in the first echelon and two (the 242nd and 162nd) in reserve. III Corps punched through the Army's defenses in 24 hours before pushing north toward Velikie Burluk. By nightfall on June 15 the German pincers had met, and while 24,800 prisoners were taken, mostly from 28th Army, this was a smaller haul than expected.

On June 22 the 1st Panzer and 6th Armies launched Operation Fridericus II as a further preliminary offensive, this one much more directly aimed at 38th Army. The III Motorized Corps aimed at the boundary between the 242nd and the 162nd to its south in planning its drive on Kupiansk on the Oskil River. The Corps linked up with XXXXIV Army Corps by late afternoon on June 24 but the 242nd, having been on the north side of the penetration, was not among the Army's divisions to suffer encirclement. Again, the total of prisoners taken was under the German expectations.

When Army Group South launched the second phase of Operation Blue on July 6 the 38th Army faced XVII Army Corps and XXXX Panzer Corps. The panzers made a spectacular advance on the first day but soon ran short of fuel. With what little remained a battlegroup of 3rd Panzer Division captured the Kalitva River bridges at Rossosh. This effort unhinged the defenses of Southwestern Front and 38th Army was authorized to retreat from the Oskil to a line situated 35–40 km to the east along the Aidar River. However, the situation worsened when 3rd Panzer reached Olkhovatka on July 8. The 28th and 38th Armies were again threatened with envelopment and in response Moskalenko formed a combat group and dispatched it northward to form a covering screen between Rovenki and Kantemirovka, although the latter fell to XXXX Panzer before it could be reached. Although the combat group was eventually able to withdraw north of the Don River, much of the rest of the two Armies was trapped between the Aidar and the Chertkovo Rivers. German intelligence identified the 242nd as part of the "bag", but sufficient men and equipment escaped that the division was not disbanded.

== 242nd Mountain Rifle Division ==
Following this near-disaster the remnants of the 242nd were moved to the North Caucasian Front where by August 1 it was part of the reorganizing 9th Army. Later in the month it was pulled out of the front lines entirely and moved into the reserves of Transcaucasian Front. There, on August 29 it was officially reformed as the 242nd Mountain Rifle Division. Its new order of battle was as follows:

- 890th Mountain Rifle Regiment (until August 23, 1944)
- 897th Mountain Rifle Regiment
- 900th Mountain Rifle Regiment
- 903rd Mountain Rifle Regiment
- 769th Artillery Regiment
- 300th Antitank Battalion (300th Battery of 45mm guns)
- 321st Reconnaissance Company (321st Cavalry Squadron)
- 410th Sapper Company (410th Sapper Battalion)
- 662nd Signal Battalion
- 275th Medical/Sanitation Battalion
- 240th Chemical Defense (Anti-gas) Company (until August 23, 1944)
- 222nd Auto Transport Company
- 463rd Field Bakery
- 928th Divisional Veterinary Hospital
- 1660th Field Postal Station
- 1243rd Field Office of the State Bank

Colonel Kashkin was removed from command the following day and put on trial for failure to carry out orders earlier in the month. He was found innocent in late September, after which he went on to serve as chief of staff of 44th Army before being given command of the 77th Rifle Division. He would be killed in action on February 21, 1943. Col. Georgii Gavrilovich Kurashvili was assigned as the new commander on August 31. In common with other Soviet mountain divisions the 242nd now had four regiments and no battalion structure. Instead each regiment had five rifle companies plus companies of supporting arms. This organization, designed for semi-independent operations in isolated mountain passes, also proved useful in amphibious operations.

== Battle of the Caucasus ==
On August 12 the OKW had subordinated the XXXXIX Mountain Corps to 17th Army and assigned it the mission of capturing the passes through the central and eastern portion of the High Caucasus Mountains and Mount Elbrus. By around August 24 the sudden advance of the German mountain troops had finally galvanized the STAVKA and the Front into forming a more rational plan of defenses for this key region. The 242nd, which was under direct command of the Front, was ordered to take up the defense of the Elbrus axis and nearby passes, which were being threatened by the 1st Mountain Division. A detachment of this division had reached the summit of Elbrus on August 21, but thereafter made little progress. The German advances on Tuapse and Mozdok had also largely stalled, leading to a major crisis within the OKW. On September 9 Hitler took over direct command of Army Group A, while on the other side on September 1 the STAVKA entrusted Army Gen. I. V. Tyulenev's Transcaucasian Front with full responsibility for defense of the Caucasus region.

Operation Attika began on September 23 with a total of seven divisions of the LVII Panzer, XXXXIX Mountain, and XXXXIV Army Corps, although the latter two Corps did not kick off until two days later. The objective was to capture Tuapse and encircle the bulk of 18th Army. By this time the 242nd had been assigned to 46th Army of the Black Sea Group of Forces, part of Transcaucasian Front; within this Army it joined the 3rd Rifle Corps which also contained the 9th and 20th Mountain Rifle Divisions. The Army was facing XXXXIX Mountain Corps on the approaches to Sukhumi. In the event the division saw very little action before Attika collapsed in late October. As of November 1 it was still in 46th Army, although 3rd Corps headquarters had been moved to 9th Army.

=== Pursuit Into the Kuban ===
Kuban Oblast in 1900. Note by 1943 Yekaterinodar was renamed Krasnodar.

By the beginning of December the 242nd was one of just five rifle divisions in 46th Army. During the month the Army was strengthened to six divisions and the 242nd was in 13th Rifle Corps on January 1, 1943. As the position of the German armies in southern Russia deteriorated, especially with the encirclement of 6th Army at Stalingrad, it became clear that Army Group A would soon be forced to retreat from the Caucasus to avoid encirclement. Tyulenev submitted a plan on January 10 in which the offensive consisted of two parts named "Mountain" (Gory) and "Sea" (More). The objective of the latter would be Novorossiysk, while the former aimed at Krasnodar and Bataysk. In the plan for Gory the 242nd was assigned objectives as follows:

Simultaneously, the group reaching the Erivanskaia Village, Akhtyrskaia, and Kholmskaia region consisting of 3rd RC (three RBs), 242nd, 394th, and 37th RDs, and 257th TR have the mission of reaching the Mar'inskaia region, from which they will attack toward Timashevskaia and further to Sosyka Station, with an arrival on the Chelbas River line. This line has been defined as jumping-off positions for the attack toward Bataisk.

It was planned that these objectives would be reached by January 30. The above force was to be concentrated by January 17 and would form the third echelon and reserve for Gory.

Prior to the start of the operation the 242nd was transferred to 47th Army, which was now to concentrate in the Shapsugskaia and Erevanskaia region for subsequent commitment toward Kholmskaia and Marianskaia. On January 26 the Army launched a local offensive in support of 56th Army, which was heavily engaged farther east. The plan of attack aimed toward Krimskaia with two shock groups deployed in the Army's center. The second group, consisting of the 242nd and the 81st Naval Rifle Brigade, deployed on a roughly 5 km-wide sector from Gaponovskii east to Nikolaevskii, roughly 3 km west of the first group. The second group was to attack northward through Tabac State Farm to cut communications routes 3 km west of Krimskaia, However, the 242nd was unable to reach its jumping-off positions on schedule due to heavy rains and poor road conditions. In the event, the attack began at 1300 hours after a 15-minute artillery raid and ineffective air strikes due to poor weather. In fighting that continued until January 31 the Army's forces gained no more than 1000m against strong Axis resistance from the 15th Luftwaffe Field Division plus the Romanian 19th Infantry and 3rd Mountain Divisions. As of February 5 the strength of the division was recorded as 8,113 personnel (6,866 combat/1,247 support), making it the strongest in 47th Army by a large margin, with 1,222 horses, 106 mortars, 31 guns (76mm and larger), eight antitank guns and 56 antitank rifles.

=== Battle for the Bridgehead ===
Krasnodar was fully liberated by forces of 46th Army on February 12. Meanwhile, the Black Sea Fleet had begun an amphibious landing operation near Novorossiysk on February 4. Later in the month the Front was renamed "North Caucasian". By mid-March it was clear that the Soviet advance had been completely halted by 17th Army's defensive positions, known as the "Blue Line", and preparations began for a major assault to break the German front. During the month the 897th Rifle Regiment was detached to the 16th Rifle Corps of 18th Army to reinforce the Malaya Zemlya beachhead near Novorossiysk while the balance of the division was reassigned to 56th Army. The Front commander, Col. Gen. I. I. Maslennikov, began what became a series of offensives against the "Blue Line" with the 56th Army on April 4, but this did not directly involve the 242nd. This effort quickly collapsed, and on April 14 the offensive was resumed using all the Front's forces in an effort to find a weak spot in the German line, but this also failed by April 16. On April 17 Colonel Kurashvili was hospitalized and handed the 242nd over to Col. Viktor Bogdanovich Lisinov. Kurashvili would soon take command of the 414th Rifle Division and would be promoted to the rank of major general in February 1944. Lisinov had previously led the 217th Reserve Rifle Regiment; he would remain in command for the duration of the war and would be made a major general on November 17.

Surprised by these failures, the STAVKA sent Marshal Zhukov and a high-level delegation to investigate. On April 17 an Axis offensive on Malaya Zemlya, Operation Neptun, began but it made little progress and was soon shut down. 56th Army began a new effort against the "Blue Line" on April 29 but this did not directly involve the 242nd. Krimskaia was finally taken during this attack, but after heavy losses to both sides it was called off by Zhukov on May 10. By late May the situation in the Taman had settled into a battle of attrition. During June the division returned to 3rd Corps, which was again designated as a mountain rifle corps and also had the 9th and 83rd Mountain Divisions under command. The division would remain in this Corps for the duration of the war. On July 22 the Front commander, Lt. Gen. I. Ye. Petrov, ordered the Corps to join an offensive which had begun on July 16 and had already effectively failed. In its supporting attack the Corps managed to push back a Romanian battalion but the penetration was quickly sealed off by German reserves. Although it was revived on August 7 it was finally called off five days later.

At the beginning of August the 3rd Corps was under direct command of the Front, but later in the month it returned to 56th Army. On September 3 Hitler finally agreed to evacuate the Kuban bridgehead. In fact, Army Group South had prepared a contingency plan known as Brunhild for a phased withdrawal to the Crimea. The evacuation began on September 15 despite pinning attacks by 56th Army earlier that day. On October 9 the final German units embarked, Taman was liberated, and the 242nd received its name as an honorific. At this time the division and its Corps was again under direct Front command.

== Crimean Campaign ==
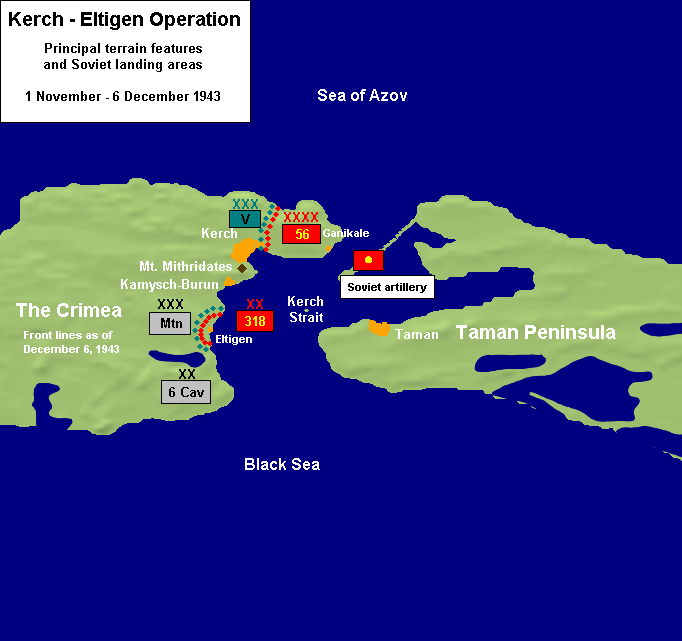
The Kerch-Eltigen Operation

On October 30 the Crimea, and the Axis forces in it, were cut off from the Ukrainian mainland by the recently renamed 4th Ukrainian Front, although Soviet efforts to crash through the defenses failed by a narrow margin. Meanwhile, General Petrov had begun planning for a crossing operation over the Kerch Strait just three days after Brunhild was completed. This operation began overnight on October 31/November 1 when the 318th Rifle Division landed at Eltigen, south of Kerch, but was soon contained. On November 3 the 2nd and 55th Guards Rifle Divisions of 56th Army began landings northeast of Kerch, but their effort to break out was stymied on November 5–6. Petrov called off further attacks until he could get more troops, tanks, artillery and supplies across the straits. As of November 10 the 56th Army was redesignated as the Separate Coastal Army and after his North Caucasian Front was disbanded on November 20 Petrov took direct command of the Army. By early December the situation at Kerch had become deadlocked.

After further breakout attempts failed in January 1944, Petrov was relieved of command of Coastal Army on February 6 and was replaced by Army Gen. A. I. Yeryomenko. While the 242nd continued to largely adhere to the old mountain rifle regiment organization, it was not quite "prewar standard" since each regiment also contained:

- Machine Gun Company (12 HMGs)
- Mortar Battery (four 120mm mortars)
- 76mm cannon Battery
- Antitank Rifle Company

On April 8 the final campaign for the Crimea began as 4th Ukrainian Front's forces attacked into the peninsula from the north. In the Kerch area the V Army Corps began retreating overnight on April 9/10; it would have to retreat over 160 km to reach relative safety around Sevastopol. Yeryomenko had three rifle corps, including 3rd Mountain, and a total of 204 tanks and self-propelled guns to conduct the pursuit. On the morning of April 11 Kerch was liberated, and on April 24 the division would be awarded the Order of the Red Banner for its part in this victory.

As the pursuit continued about 10,000 troops from V Corps evacuated from Sudak to Balaklava by sea, but the remainder were forced to retreat through the Yaila Mountains. The Corps reached the eastern outskirts of Sevastopol on April 16, but it had lost thousands of soldiers and over 70 percent of its artillery and heavy weapons. Sevastopol was in no state to withstand another siege. On April 16 Yeryomenko was transferred to 2nd Baltic Front and Coastal Army was subordinated to 4th Ukrainian Front. On May 10 the city was liberated while Coastal Army mopped up the Chersonese Peninsula. On the same day two regiments of the 242nd received battle honors:

SEVASTOPOL - ...897th Mountain Rifle Regiment (Lt. Colonel Shitov, Filipp Ivanovich), 903rd Mountain Rifle Regiment (Lt. Colonel Gavrilov, Nikolai Gavrilovich)... The troops who participated in the liberation of Sevastopol, by the order of the Supreme High Command of 10 May 1944, and a commendation in Moscow, are given a salute of 24 artillery salvoes from 324 guns.

== Into the Carpathians ==
By the beginning of June the Coastal Army was again separate from 4th Ukrainian Front, which was in the Reserve of the Supreme High Command. The Crimea was a strategic dead-end, and it was a matter of time before the forces there were redeployed. In August, the division was reorganized with two mountain rifle battalions in each regiment. At about this time, along with the rest of 3rd Mountain Corps, it was transferred to 18th Army in 4th Ukrainian Front, which was now deployed facing the foothills of the Carpathian Mountains, a logical placement for mountain troops.

Beginning on September 9 the Front attempted to break through the positions of 1st Panzer Army into the Dukla Pass in the Laborec Highlands toward Uzhhorod. During the month the 3rd Corps was transferred to 1st Guards Army. The advance made slow progress to begin with but by the start of October began to make headway in part due to the removal of a panzer division and on October 6 the pass was taken. By the 14th the Front was on the move again, slowly advancing south of Dukla Pass through German fortified positions; 1st Guards Army was attempting to force some of the smaller passes farther east. In recognition of its part in this fighting the 769th Artillery Regiment was given the honorific "Carpathian", while on October 31 the 897th Mountain Rifle Regiment would be decorated with the Order of Suvorov, 3rd Degree and the 903rd Regiment received the Order of Bogdan Khmelnitsky, 2nd Degree. During this fighting the average rifle company in the division was down to 68 men, but each regiment had:

- One battery of four 76mm cannon
- One battery of four 76mm mountain guns
- One Antitank Rifle Company
- One Submachine Gun Company
- One Sapper Company
- One battery of four 107mm mountain mortars

Through November and into December, as the 2nd and 3rd Ukrainian Fronts encircled Budapest, the 3rd Corps pushed on toward the towns of Humenné and Michalovce and on December 16 the 900th Rifle and 769th Artillery Regiments would each receive the Order of the Red Banner for their role in taking these towns.

=== Western Carpathian and Moravia–Ostrava Offensives ===
1st Guards Army launched its next operation on January 18, 1945 against the German XI Army Corps over the Ondava River through such mountainous terrain that only 42 tanks could be effectively used. Eventually the Army was able to liberate the cities of Prešov, Nowy Targ and Bielsko. 4th Ukrainian Front then began an attack preliminary to a new offensive during March 10–12, but this did not involve 1st Guards Army. The main event began on March 15 but stalled after two days. On March 22 the Front's forces began striking west toward Ratibor, which was abandoned by Army Group Center on the 30th in order to prevent a breakthrough to Moravian Ostrava. The offensive was suspended the next day.

== Prague Offensive and Postwar ==
On April 6 the 60th Army was transferred from 1st Ukrainian to 4th Ukrainian Front, and the 3rd Mountain Rifle Corps was transferred to this Army for the final offensives. The STAVKA redirected the Front toward Olomouc and on April 22 Opava fell to 60th Army's forces. On May 6 the advance reached Šternberk. When the shooting stopped the division carried the full title of 242nd Mountain Rifle, Taman, Order of the Red Banner Division. (Russian: 242-я горно-стрелковая Таманская Краснознамённая дивизия.) In a final distinction, on May 28 it was awarded the Order of Kutuzov, 2nd Degree, for its part in the liberation of Moravian Ostrava. Within months it was moved to Khust where it was assigned to 38th Army. It was disbanded in 1946.
