= Friedrich Zickwolff =

German general

- Born: 1 August 1893; Bayreuth, Bavaria, German Empire
- Died: 17 September 1944 (aged 51); Brittany, Occupied France
- Military career
- Allegiance: Nazi Germany
- Branch: Army (Wehrmacht)
- Rank: Generalleutnant
- Commands: 227th Infantry Division; 113th Infantry Division; 95th Infantry Division
- Conflicts: World War II
- Awards: Knight's Cross of the Iron Cross

Friedrich Zickwolff (1 August 1893 – 17 September 1944) was a German general during World War II. He was a recipient of the Knight's Cross of the Iron Cross of Nazi Germany.

Zickwolff died on 17 September 1944 from an infectious disease contracted while serving on the Eastern Front. He was buried in the military cemetery in Ludwigsburg on 21 September 1944. In October 2021, against the background of official commemorations marking the 80th anniversary of the Babi Yar Massacre, Zickwolff's name appeared among the 161 names of the perpetrators of that crime, released by the Babi Year Holocaust Memorial Center. Troops under Zickwolff's command participated in the massacre.

== Awards and decorations ==
- Knight's Cross of the Iron Cross on 2 June 1942 as Generalleutnant commander of 113. Infanterie-Division

Military offices
Preceded by None	Commander of 227. Infanterie-Division; 1 September 1939 – 6 May 1940	Succeeded by Generalleutnant Friedrich-Karl von Wachter
Preceded by Generalleutnant Friedrich-Karl von Wachter	Commander of 227. Infanterie-Division; 1 July 1940 – 12 April 1941	Succeeded by Generalleutnant Friedrich von Scotti
Preceded by Generalleutnant Ernst Güntzel	Commander of 113. Infanterie-Division; 4 June 1941 – 8 September 1941	Succeeded by Oberst Paape
Preceded by Oberst Paape	Commander of 113. Infanterie-Division; September 1941 – 10 May 1942	Succeeded by Generalleutnant Hans-Heinrich Sixt von Armin
Preceded by Generalleutnant Hans-Heinrich Sixt von Armin	Commander of 95. Infanterie-Division; 10 May 1942 – 6 September 1942	Succeeded by Generalleutnant Friedrich Karst
Preceded by None	Commander of 343. Infanterie-Division; 28 September 1942 – 25 August 1943	Succeeded by Generalmajor Hermann Kruse
