= Friedrich Karst =

German general (1893–1975)

- Born: 4 September 1893; Deutsch-Eylau, West Prussia, German Empire
- Died: 18 October 1975 (aged 82); Herford, West Germany
- Military career
- Allegiance: German Empire (to 1918); Weimar Republic (to 1933); Nazi Germany
- Branch: Army (Wehrmacht)
- Service years: 1912–1945
- Rank: Generalleutnant
- Commands: 95 Infantry Division; 262 Infantry Division; Division Nr. 466
- Conflicts: World War I World War II
- Awards: Knight's Cross of the Iron Cross

Friedrich Karst (4 September 1893 – 18 October 1975) was a general in the Wehrmacht of Nazi Germany during World War II who commanded several divisions. He was a recipient of the Knight's Cross of the Iron Cross.

== Awards and decorations ==
- Knight's Cross of the Iron Cross on 28 August 1942 as Oberst and commander of Infanterie-Regiment 461

Military offices
Preceded by Generalleutnant Friedrich Zickwolff	Commander of 95. Infanterie-Division; 6 September 1942 – 27 September 1942	Succeeded by Generalleutnant Edward Aldrian
Preceded by General der Artillerie Edgar Theißen	Commander of 262. Infanterie-Division; 15 September 1942 – 1 July 1943	Succeeded by Generalleutnant Eugen Wößner
