= 227th Infantry Division (Wehrmacht) =

- 227. Infanterie-Division
- Division insignia
- Active: 26 August 1939 – February 1945
- Country: Nazi Germany
- Branch: Army
- Type: Infantry
- Size: Division
- Engagements: World War II: Sinyavino offensive

The 227th Infantry Division named "Rheinisch-Westfälische" was a division of the German Wehrmacht during World War II created on 26 August 1939 in Krefeld. The division was deployed for the last time in February 1945 in the Tuchola Forest.

== Operational history ==
=== Activation and the low countries ===
The 227th Infantry Division was formed during the 3rd wave mobilization in August 1939 in Krefeld. Shortly thereafter it served with the 5th Army performing border protection in the Eifel region. In December 1939 it was assigned to the 6th Army and became a part of Army Group B in preparation for 'Fall gelb' (case yellow). In early 1940, motorcycle components of the Leibstandarte SS Adolf Hitler under Kurt Meyer were attached to the 227th Infantry Division during the preparations for the invasion of the Netherlands. The division took part in the invasion of the Netherlands and France in May–June 1940. As part of the X Army Corps of the 18th Army, it participated in the advance through Enschede and Deventer, and helped to capture the fort at Pannerden and the break through the Grebbe line. After the crossing of the IJssel the division advanced through Zwolle and Amersfoort. Shortly thereafter came the capitulation of the Netherlands. Following the victory in France the division performed occupation, security and coastal defense duties along the Normandy coast near Le Havre from July 1940 until December 1941.

=== Leningrad ===
In late 1941 the division was transferred to Army Group North on the Eastern Front. There the division was engaged in heavy fighting in and around Leningrad. In January 1942, the division was part of Herbert Loch's 28th Army Corps (XXVIII AK), in the 18th Army. The division defended against the Red Army's main offensive at Sinyavino Heights, the Chernaya and the south shore of Lake Ladoga. The division suffered heavy casualties in what was called the First Battle of Lake Ladoga from August through September 1942.

In January 1943 the Soviets launched Operation Iskra (the second Battle of Lake Ladoga) and the division became encircled in Schlüsselburg, along with two battalions of the 96th Infantry Division. After fierce fighting the division was able to rally and break out of the pocket. It reached the German lines to the south, but three of its grenadier battalions were so badly mauled that they were disbanded, with the survivors being transferred to other grenadier battalions in the division.

In January 1944 the pressure from the Soviet army was such that the 227th Infantry Division and the rest of the XLIII Army Corps had to withdraw to positions behind Narva. During this withdrawal the division suffered heavy losses. In February 1944 the division was strengthened by elements of the 9th Luftwaffe Field Division, which itself had suffered heavily and been dissolved. Intense fighting followed in Courland, when the division was picked up by the Kriegsmarine (German navy) during the evacuation, linking up with Army Group Vistula's 2nd Army and transferred to West Prussia. It fought on in the Vistula, Danzig and Gotenhafen, where it was destroyed by March 1945. In April 1945, the staff of the division was absorbed by the staff of the Panzer-Verband Ausbildungs Ostsee.

== Commanding officers ==
- Lieutenant General Friedrich Zickwolff (1 September 1939 – 6 May 1940)
- Lieutenant General Friedrich-Karl von Wachter (6 May 1940 – 1 July 1940)
- Lieutenant General Friedrich Zickwolff (1 July 1940 – 12 April 1941)
- Lieutenant General Friedrich von Scotti (12 April 1941 – 7 June 1943)
- General of the Infantry Wilhelm Berlin (7 June 1943 – 11 May 1944)
- Major General of the Reserves Maximilian Wengler (11 May 1944 – 27 March 1945)
