= Joachim-Friedrich Lang =

German general

- Born: 14 September 1899; Montigny-lès-Metz, Imperial Territory of Alsace-Lorraine, German Empire
- Died: 16 April 1945 (aged 45); Pillau, Samland District, East Prussia
- Military career
- Allegiance: German Empire (to 1918); Weimar Republic (to 1920); Nazi Germany (to 1945)
- Branch: Imperial German Army; Freikorps; Provisional Reichswehr; Heer
- Service years: 1918–1920; 1937–1945
- Rank: Generalleutnant
- Nickname: Fritz
- Unit: 95th Infanterie-Division (Teufel-Division)
- Commands: Commander of the 95th Infanterie-Division
- Conflicts: World War II
- Awards: German Cross; Knight's Cross of the Iron Cross

Joachim-Friedrich Lang was a German officer, finally Generalleutnant of the Wehrmacht during World War II.

== Biography ==
Born on 14 September 1899 in Montigny-lès-Metz, Alsace-Lorraine, Joachim-Friedrich Lang joined the Imperial German Army during World War I. Following the outbreak of World War II, Lang took part in the invasion of France and then served on the Eastern Front. He had by then reached the rank of Oberst. Lang served in the Field in the 481st Grenadier-Regiment. In this regiment, Lang was awarded the German Cross on 14 June 1942. Soon after, Joachim Lang was awarded the Knight's Cross of the Iron Cross on 4 September 1943. Lang was appointed the commander of 95th Infanterie-Division on 30 June 1944. He was promoted to the rank of Generalmajor (Major General) on 1 October 1944, near Königsberg. Then, Lang fought near Pillau, before being killed in action on 16 April 1945. On 20 April 1945, he was posthumously promoted to Generalleutnant, although the promotion had been decided on while he was still alive.

== Awards and decorations (excerpt) ==
- Iron Cross (1914), 2nd Class
- The Honour Cross of the World War 1914/1918
- Repetition Clasp 1939 to the Iron Cross 1914, 2nd Class
- Iron Cross (1939), 1st Class
- Winter Battle in the East 1941–42 Medal
- German Cross in Gold on 14 June 1942
- Knight's Cross of the Iron Cross on 4 September 1943

== Sources ==
- Karl Knoblauch :Kampf und Untergang einer Infanterie Division: Die 95. Infanterie Division (in German)
- Dermot Bradley : Die Generale des Heeres 1921-1945 Band 7 Knabe-Luz, Biblio Verlag, Bissendorf, 2004, p. 370-371 (in German)
