= Hans-Heinrich Sixt von Armin =

German general

- Born: 6 November 1890; Stettin, German Empire
- Died: 1 April 1952 (aged 61); Krasnogorsk, Moscow Oblast, Russian SFSR, Soviet Union
- Relatives: Friedrich Sixt von Armin (father)
- Military career
- Allegiance: German Empire (to 1918); Weimar Republic (to 1933); Nazi Germany
- Branch: Army (Wehrmacht)
- Service years: 1909–1945
- Rank: Generalleutnant
- Commands: 95. Infanterie-Division; 113. Infanterie-Division
- Conflicts: World War I World War II: Battle of Stalingrad (POW)
- Awards: Knight's Cross of the Iron Cross

Hans-Heinrich Sixt von Armin (6 November 1890 – 1 April 1952) was a German general during World War II who commanded several divisions. He was a recipient of the Knight's Cross of the Iron Cross. Armin surrendered following the Battle of Stalingrad in 1943 and died in Soviet captivity on 1 April 1952. He was the son of World War I general Friedrich Sixt von Armin.

== War crimes ==
In July 1941, Sixt von Armin had 200 Jews shot in Zhytomyr for allegedly abusing German soldiers.

== Dates of rank ==
- Major (1 April 1929)
- Oberstleutnant (1 October 1932)
- Oberst (1 October 1934)
- Generalmajor (1 March 1938)
- Generalleutnant (1 March 1940)

== Awards and decorations ==
- Knight's Cross of the Iron Cross on 22 September 1941 as Generalleutnant and commander of 95. Infanterie-Division

Military offices
Preceded by none	Commander of 95. Infanterie-Division; 25 September 1939 – 10 May 1942	Succeeded by Generalleutnant Friedrich Zickwolff
Preceded by Generalleutnant Friedrich Zickwolff	Commander of 113. Infanterie-Division; 10 May 1942 – 2 February 1943	Succeeded by Generalmajor Friedrich Wilhelm Pruet
