= Friedrich von Scotti =

- Born: 3 May 1889; Offenbach, German Empire
- Died: 16 July 1969 (aged 80); Karlsruhe, West Germany
- Military career
- Allegiance: Nazi Germany
- Branch: Army (Wehrmacht)
- Rank: Generalleutnant
- Commands: 227th Infantry Division
- Conflicts: World War II
- Awards: Knight's Cross of the Iron Cross

Friedrich von Scotti (3 May 1889 – 16 July 1969) was a general in the Wehrmacht of Nazi Germany during World War II. He was a recipient of the Knight's Cross of the Iron Cross.

== Awards and decorations ==
- German Cross in Gold on 12 November 1942 as Generalleutnant and commander of 227. Infanterie-Division
- Knight's Cross of the Iron Cross on 8 June 1943 as Generalleutnant and commander of 227. Infanterie-Division

Military offices
Preceded by Generalleutnant Friedrich Zickwolff	Commander of 227. Infanterie-Division; 12 April 1941 – 7 June 1943	Succeeded by General der Infanterie Wilhelm Berlin
