= 113th Infantry Division (Wehrmacht) =

- 113. Infanterie-Division
- Active: 10 December 1940 – 25 November 1943
- Disbanded: 25 November 1943
- Country: Nazi Germany
- Branch: Army
- Type: Infantry
- Size: Division
- Garrison/HQ: First: Passau; Later: Prague
- Engagements: World War II: Battle of Stalingrad

The 113th Infantry Division was an infantry division of the Wehrmacht in World War II.

== History ==
The division was created on 10 December 1940 in Grafenwöhr. It participated in Operation Barbarossa and the Battle of Kiev (1941), before being sent to Serbia for anti-partisan operations. After the defeat in the Battle of Moscow, the division was rushed back to Russia to help stop the Soviet counter-offensive.

In 1942, the division participated in the Second Battle of Kharkov, Case Blue and the Battle of Stalingrad, where it was annihilated.

The division was reformed on 21 March 1943 in occupied France. From 1 June 1943, it was relocated to the hinterland, where retaliatory actions against French partisans were carried out.

On 20 July, the 113th Infantry Division was sent back to Russia, to take over a section of the "Buffalo Position" near Rzhev as part of Army Group Center. On 7 August, the Red Army attacked the division at the start of the Smolensk operation. The mostly inexperienced soldiers of the division withdrew in panic, so that the battle-hardened 18th Panzer Grenadier Division had to be brought in to rectify the situation. In the following battles, the troops of the 113th Infantry Division continued to suffer high losses and were mostly subordinated to the neighboring divisions. Due to the low combat value of the division, it was disbanded on 2 November 1943.

The remains of the division were transferred to the Divisions-Gruppe 113 of the 337th Infantry Division after the Battle of Nevel in November 1943.

== Organization ==
Structure of the division:

- Headquarters
- 260th Infantry Regiment
- 261st Infantry Regiment
- 268th Infantry Regiment
- 87th Artillery Regiment
- 113th Reconnaissance Battalion
- 113th Tank Destroyer Battalion
- 113th Engineer Battalion
- 113th Signal Battalion
- 113th Divisional Supply Group

== Commanding officers ==
- Generalleutnant Ernst Güntzel, 10 December 1940 – 4 June 1941,
- Generalleutnant Friedrich Zickwolff, 4 June 1941 – 10 May 1942,
- Generalleutnant Hans-Heinrich Sixt von Armin, 10 May 1942 – 20 January 1943 : POW,
- Generalmajor Friedrich-Wilhelm Prüter, 15 March 1943 – 25 November 1943.

== War Crimes ==
The 113th division participated in the Massacre at Babi Yar under Friedrich Zickwolff.
