= 262nd Infantry Division =

- German: 262. Infanterie-Division
- Active: 26 August 1939 – 2 November 1943
- Country: Nazi Germany
- Branch: Heer (Wehrmacht)
- Type: Infantry
- Size: Division
- Engagements: Phony War; Battle of Moscow; Battle of Kursk

The 262nd Infantry Division (German: 262. Infanterie-Division) was an infantry division of the German Heer during World War II.

== History ==
The 262nd Infantry Division was formed in Mistelbach in Wehrkreis XVII on 26 August 1939, the day of German mobilization, as a division of the fourth Aufstellungswelle. It initially consisted of the Infantry Regiments 462, 482, and 486, as well as the Artillery Regiment 262. The initial divisional commander was Edgar Theisen.

On 28 January 1940, the division passed an infantry battalion to the 296th Infantry Division of the eighth Aufstellungswelle. On 1 October 1940, a third of the division's strength was transferred to the 137th Infantry Division of the eleventh Aufstellungswelle.

The 262nd Infantry Division was posted opposite the Maginot Line in late 1939 and remained there until after the conclusion of the Battle of France. In September 1940, the division was redeployed to occupied Poland, and participated in Operation Barbarossa in June 1941. It advanced via Brody, Zhytomyr, Kiev and Bryansk and was then deployed to the Battle of Moscow. In 1942, it served under Army Group Center. On 15 September 1942, Friedrich Karst replaced Theisen as divisional commander.

In July 1943, the 262nd Infantry Division participated in the Battle of Kursk. On 19 July 1943, Eugen Wößner became the final divisional commander, replacing Karst.

On 2 November 1943, the 262nd Infantry Division was dissolved and restructured into the Division Group 262, under the newly formed Corps Detachment D. The Division Group 262 was formed into the Grenadier Regiment 192 and assigned to the 56th Infantry Division. The former division's reinforcement units were added to the 277th Infantry Division of the twenty-second Aufstellungswelle on 17 November 1944.

== Insignia ==
The divisional emblem of the 262nd Infantry Division showed a black church over wavy blue lines, all on a white circular background. The church was meant to represent St. Stephen's Cathedral in Vienna, whereas the wavy lines invoked the Danube river.

== Superior formations ==
Organizational chart of the 262nd Infantry Division
Year	Month	Army Corps	Army	Army Group	Area
1939	September	In assembly.	7th Army	Army Group C	Upper Rhine
1939	December	XXIV	1st Army	Army Group C	Saarpfalz
1940	January – May	XXIV	1st Army	Army Group C	Saarpfalz
1940	June	XXXVII	1st Army	Army Group C	Maginot Line
1940	July – August	HK XXXXV	1st Army	Army Group C	France
1940	September – December	IX	12th Army	Army Group B	Poland
1941	January – March	IX	17th Army	Army Group B	Poland
1941	April	XXXIV	17th Army	Army Group B	Poland
1941	May	XXXIV	17th Army	Army Group A	Poland
1941	June	IV	17th Army	Army Group South	Brody
1941	July	XXXXIV	17th Army	Army Group South	Zhytomyr
1941	August – September	LI	6th Army	Army Group South	Kiev
1941	October	XXXV	2nd Panzer Army	Army Group Center	Bryansk
1941	November – December	XXXV	2nd Army	Army Group Center	Yelets
1942	January	XXXV	2nd Army	Army Group Center	Orel
1942	February – December	XXXV	2nd Panzer Army	Army Group Center	Orel
1943	January – July	XXXV	2nd Panzer Army	Army Group Center	Orel
1943	August	Army reserves.	9th Army	Army Group Center	Orel
1943	September	XII	9th Army	Army Group Center	Bryansk
1943	October	XII	4th Army	Army Group Center	Orsha
1943	November	Restructured into Corps Detachment D.			

== Noteworthy individuals ==
- Edgar Theisen, divisional commander between 26 August 1939 and 15 September 1942.
- Friedrich Karst, divisional commander between 15 September 1942 and 19 July 1943.
- Eugen Wößner, divisional commander between 19 July 1943 and 2 November 1943.
