= 95th Infantry Division (Wehrmacht) =

- German: 95. Infanterie-Division
- 95. Infanterie-Division Vehicle Insignia 1
- Active: 19 September 1939 –1945
- Country: Nazi Germany
- Branch: Army
- Type: Infantry
- Size: Division
- Engagements: World War II

The 95th Infantry Division (German: 95. Infanterie-Division) was a German division in World War II. It was formed on 19 September 1939 in Wildflecken and Hammelburg.

On 22 June 1944, the day of the Red Army's Operation Bagration, the 95th Infantry Division was in the reserves of 3rd Panzer Army.

The division was destroyed in June 1944 near Vitebsk. On 10 September 1944, a newly formed 95th Division was placed under command of the defeated army group Mitte in East Prussia. In the winter of 1944 it fought at Tauroggen and the Memel, until it surrendered in April 1945 at Pillau and the Hel Peninsula.

== Commanding officers ==
- Generalleutnant Hans-Heinrich Sixt von Armin, 25 September 1939 – 10 May 1942
- Generalleutnant Friedrich Zickwolff, 10 May 1942 – 6 September 1942
- Generalleutnant Friedrich Karst, 6 September 1942 – 1 October 1942
- Generalleutnant Eduard Aldrian, 1 October 1942 – 3 October 1942
- General der Infanterie Edgar Röhricht, 3 October 1942 – September 1943
- Generalmajor Gustav Gihr, September 1943 – 27 February 1944
- Generalmajor Herbert Michaelis, 27 February 1944 – 28 June 1944 (POW)
- Generalmajor Joachim-Friedrich Lang, 10 September 1944 -16 April 1945 (KIA)

== War Crimes ==
The 95th division participated in the Massacre at Babi Yar

=== Second formation ===
- Generalmajor Joachim-Friedrich Lang, 10 September 1944 - 16 April 1945 (KIA)
