= Samland District =

Former district in Königsberg Region, East Prussia

Samland District (Landkreis Samland), was a district in Königsberg Region, East Prussia.
