= Vop (river) =

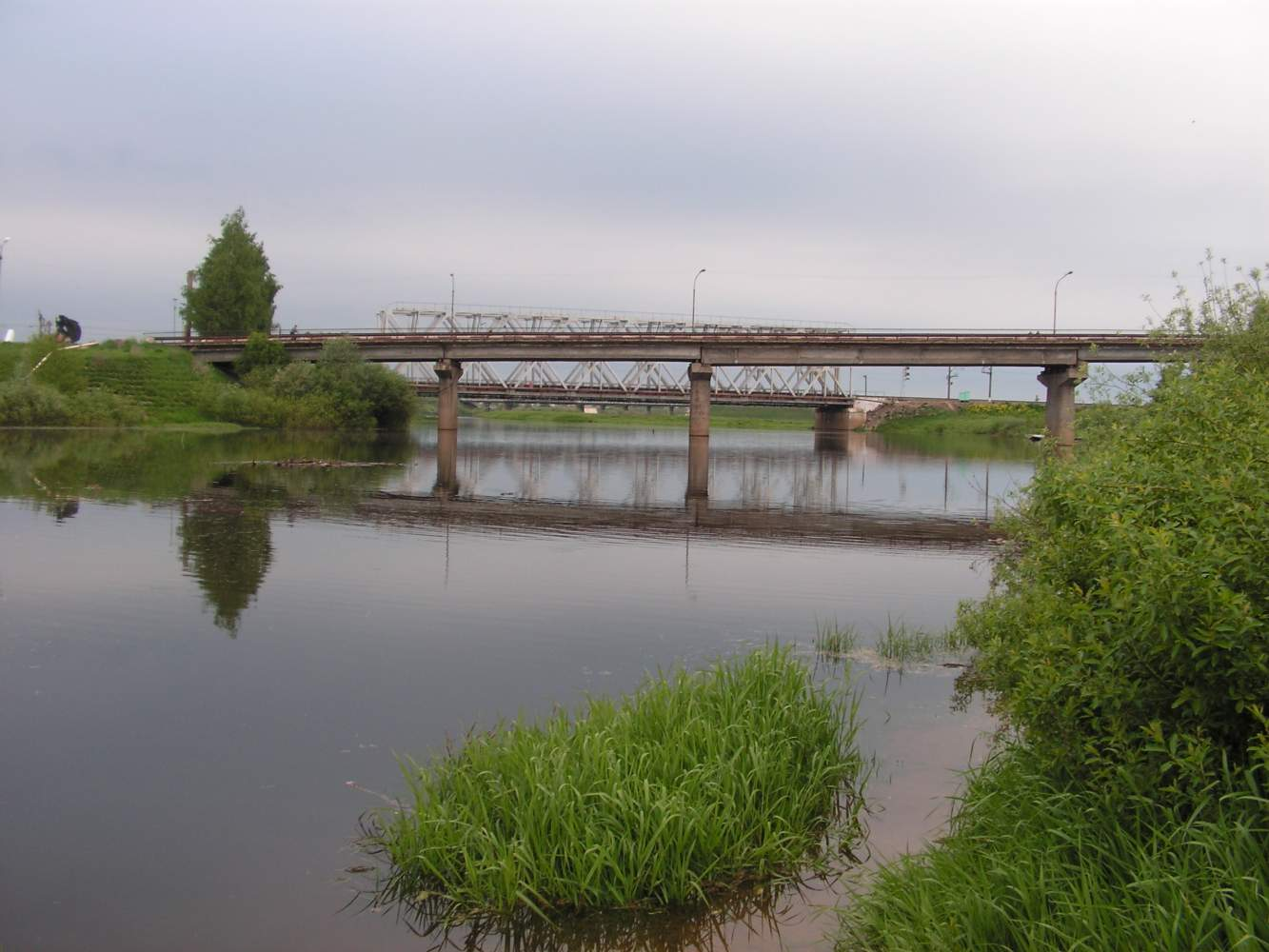
- The Vop at Yartsevo

Location
- Country: Russia

Physical characteristics
- Mouth: Dnieper
  - coordinates: 54°55′38″N 32°44′07″E
- Length: 158 km (98 mi)
- Basin size: 3,300 km^{2} (1,300 sq mi)
- Discharge
  - average: 22 m^{3}/s (780 cu ft/s)

Basin features
- Progression: Dnieper→ Dnieper–Bug estuary→ Black Sea

The Vop (Russian: Вопь) is a river in Smolensk Oblast, Russia. It is a right tributary of the Dnieper. It is 158 km long, with a drainage basin of 3300 km². The average discharge is 22 m³/s.

The river was the site of intense combat operations in the Smolensk region in the period July–September, 1941 as part of Operation Barbarossa.
